= Dan Fogelberg discography =

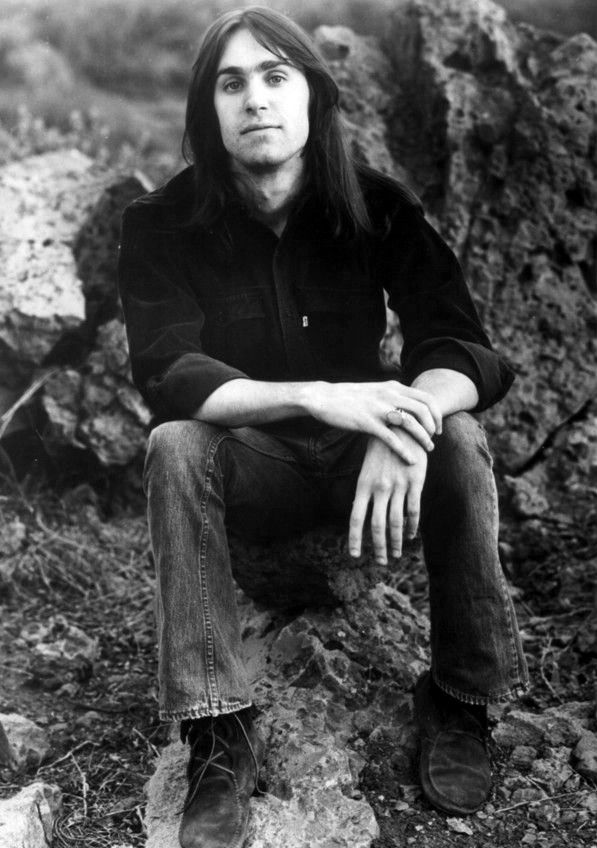
- Fogelberg in 1974
- Studio albums: 16
- Live albums: 3
- Compilation albums: 7
- Singles: 21

This is a detailed discography for American singer-songwriter Dan Fogelberg. Six of his solo albums achieved platinum status from the Recording Industry Association of America (RIAA). His 1978 collaborative album with jazz flutist Tim Weisberg, Twin Sons of Different Mothers, also went platinum. Fogelberg's most successful song on the music charts was "Longer", which spent two weeks at number two on the Billboard Hot 100 in March 1980. Four of his singles reached number one on the Billboard Adult Contemporary chart. Additionally, his 1980 single "Same Old Lang Syne" continues to receive regular radio play around the holiday season.

== Albums ==
=== Solo studio albums ===
Year	Album	Chart positions				Certifications	
Year	Album	US	US Country	AUS	CAN	RIAA	CRIA
1972	Home Free	210	—	—	—	Platinum	—
1974	Souvenirs	17	—	—	47	2×Platinum	—
1975	Captured Angel	23	—	—	82	Platinum	—
1977	Nether Lands	13	—	—	51	2×Platinum	—
1979	Phoenix	3	—	27	27	2×Platinum	—
1981	The Innocent Age	6	—	38	30	2×Platinum	Gold
1984	Windows and Walls	15	—	38	52	Gold	—
1985	High Country Snows	30	23	79	—	Gold	—
1987	Exiles	48	—	86	80	—	—
1990	The Wild Places	103	—	—	—	—	—
1993	River of Souls	164	—	—	—	—	—
1999	The First Christmas Morning	—	—	—	—	—	—
2003	Full Circle	—	—	—	—	—	—
2009	Love in Time	117	—	—	—	—	—

=== Studio albums with Tim Weisberg ===
Year	Album	Chart Positions			Certifications	
Year	Album	US	AUS	CAN	RIAA	CRIA
1978	Twin Sons of Different Mothers	8	81	22	Platinum	Gold
1995	No Resemblance Whatsoever	—	—	—	—	—

=== Live albums ===
Year	Album	Chart Positions		Certifications	
Year	Album	US	CAN	RIAA	CRIA
1991	Dan Fogelberg Live: Greetings from the West	—	—	—	—
2000	Live: Something Old New Borrowed & Some Blues	—	—	—	—
2017	Live at Carnegie Hall	71	—	—	—

=== Compilation albums ===
Year	Album	Chart Positions			Certifications	
Year	Album	US	AUS	CAN	RIAA	CRIA
1982	Greatest Hits	15	68	34	3×Platinum	Gold
1995	Love Songs	—	—	—	—	—
1997	Portrait: The Music of Dan Fogelberg (4-CD boxed set)	—	—	—	—	—
1997	Promises	—	—	—	—	—
1998	Super Hits	—	—	—	—	—
2001	The Very Best of Dan Fogelberg	—	—	—	—	—
2003	The Essential Dan Fogelberg	—	—	—	—	—
2016	The Definitive Anthology	—	—	—	—	—

== Singles ==
Year	Single	Peak positions									Album
Year	Single	US	US AC	US Country	US Rock	CAN	CAN AC	CAN Country	UK	AUS	Album
1972	"To the Morning"	—	—	—	—	—	—	—	—	—	Home Free
1975	"Part of the Plan"	31	22	—	—	50	24	—	—	71	Souvenirs
1977	"Love Gone By"	—	—	—	—	84	—	—	—	—	Nether Lands
1978	"The Power of Gold" (with Tim Weisberg)	24	—	—	—	51	—	—	—	—	Twin Sons of Different Mothers
1979	"Longer"	2	1	85	—	19	6	64	59	41	Phoenix
1980	"Heart Hotels"	21	3	—	—	81	—	—	—	—	Phoenix
1980	"Same Old Lang Syne"	9	8	—	—	—	—	—	—	—	The Innocent Age
1981	"Hard to Say"	7	2	—	14	16	1	—	—	—	The Innocent Age
1981	"Leader of the Band"	9	1	—	—	18	1	—	—	79	The Innocent Age
1982	"Run for the Roses"	18	3	—	—	33	1	16	—	—	The Innocent Age
1982	"Missing You"	23	6	—	30	29	11	—	—	55	Greatest Hits
1983	"Make Love Stay"	29	1	—	—	—	1	—	—	—	Greatest Hits
1984	"The Language of Love"	13	14	—	8	—	11	—	—	—	Windows and Walls
1984	"Believe in Me"	48	1	—	—	—	1	—	—	—	Windows and Walls
1984	"Sweet Magnolia (And the Travelling Salesman)"	—	36	—	—	—	—	—	—	—	Windows and Walls
1985	"Go Down Easy"	85	6	56	—	—	7	32	—	—	High Country Snows
1985	"Down the Road/Mountain Pass"	—	—	33	—	—	—	28	—	—	High Country Snows
1987	"She Don't Look Back"	84	—	—	13	—	—	—	—	—	Exiles
1987	"Lonely in Love"	—	2	—	—	—	1	—	—	—	Exiles
1987	"Seeing You Again"	—	15	—	—	—	—	—	—	—	Exiles
1990	"Rhythm of the Rain"	—	3	—	—	39	2	—	—	129	The Wild Places
1991	"Anastasia' Eyes"	—	32	—	—	—	—	—	—	—	The Wild Places

== Other charted songs ==
Year	Single	Peak positions	Album
Year	Single	US Rock	Album
1981	"Lost in the Sun"	45	The Innocent Age
1984	"Gone Too Far"	31	Windows and Walls
