= The Very Best of Dan Fogelberg =

Greatest hits album by Dan Fogelberg
- Released: 2001
- Length: 74:09
- Label: Sony

Dan Fogelberg chronology
No Resemblance Whatsoever (1995)	The Very Best of Dan Fogelberg (2001)	Love in Time (2009)

Professional ratings
Review scores
Source	Rating
AllMusic	4.5/5 stars

The Very Best of Dan Fogelberg is a compilation album by Dan Fogelberg, released in 2001 by Sony Records.

== Track listing ==
All songs written by Dan Fogelberg, except "Rhythm of the Rain" (John Gummoe). All songs produced by Fogelberg and Marty Lewis, unless stated otherwise.

No.	Title	Producer(s)	Length
1.	"Nether Lands" (from Nether Lands, 1977)	Dan Fogelberg; Norbert Putnam	5:34
2.	"Part of the Plan" (from Souvenirs, 1974)	Joe Walsh	3:18
3.	"Heart Hotels" (from Phoenix, 1979)	Fogelberg; Putnam; Marty Lewis	4:14
4.	"Longer" (from Phoenix)		3:15
5.	"Hard to Say" (from The Innocent Age, 1981)		3:59
6.	"Leader of the Band" (from The Innocent Age)		4:19
7.	"Same Old Lang Syne" (from The Innocent Age)		5:20
8.	"Run for the Roses" (from The Innocent Age)		4:19
9.	"Make Love Stay" (from Greatest Hits, 1982)		4:33
10.	"Missing You" (from Greatest Hits)		4:05
11.	"The Language of Love" (from Windows and Walls, 1984)		3:43
12.	"Believe in Me" (from Windows and Walls)		4:36
13.	"Lonely in Love" (from Exiles, 1987)	Fogelberg; Russ Kunkel	5:28
14.	"She Don't Look Back" (from Exiles)	Fogelberg; Kunkel	4:45
15.	"Rhythm of the Rain" (from The Wild Places, 1990)	Fogelberg	4:22
16.	"Magic Every Moment" (from River of Souls, 1993)	Fogelberg	4:22
17.	"A Love Like This" (from River of Souls)	Fogelberg	3:57
