= Love Songs (Dan Fogelberg album) =

Greatest hits album by Dan Fogelberg
- Released: 1995
- Genre: Pop
- Label: Epic

Professional ratings
Review scores
| Source | Rating |
|---|---|
| Allmusic | 3/5 stars |

Love Songs is a 1995 music album containing a compilation of Dan Fogelberg recordings, released by Epic Records. It contains 10 previously released tracks:

== Track listing ==
All songs were written by Dan Fogelberg; all songs were produced by Fogelberg and Marty Lewis, unless stated otherwise.

| No. | Title | Producer(s) | Length |
|---|---|---|---|
| 1. | "Heart Hotels" (from Phoenix, 1979) | Dan Fogelberg; Norbert Putnam; Marty Lewis | 4:14 |
| 2. | "Hard to Say" (from The Innocent Age, 1981) | | 4:00 |
| 3. | "Longer" (from Phoenix) | | 3:14 |
| 4. | "Make Love Stay" (from Greatest Hits, 1982) | | 4:32 |
| 5. | "Leader of the Band" (from The Innocent Age) | | 4:16 |
| 6. | "Run for the Roses" (from The Innocent Age) | | 4:11 |
| 7. | "Same Old Lang Syne" (standalone single, 1980) | | 5:19 |
| 8. | "Lonely in Love" (from Exiles, 1987) | Fogelberg; Russ Kunkel | 5:27 |
| 9. | "A Love Like This" (from River of Souls, 1993) | Fogelberg | 3:56 |
| 10. | "Seeing You Again" (from Exiles) | Fogelberg; Russ Kunkel | 5:00 |
