= Greatest Hits (Dan Fogelberg album) =

Greatest hits album by Dan Fogelberg
- Released: October 1982
- Recorded: 1972–1982
- Genre: Soft rock
- Length: 42:23
- Label: Full Moon/Epic
- Producer: Dan Fogelberg, Joe Walsh, Marty Lewis, Norbert Putnam, Tim Weisberg

Dan Fogelberg chronology
The Innocent Age (1981)	Greatest Hits (1982)	Windows and Walls (1984)

Singles from Greatest Hits
- 1. "Missing You" Released: 1982; 2. "Make Love Stay" Released: 1983

Professional ratings
Review scores
Source	Rating
Allmusic	4/5 stars

Greatest Hits is a compilation album by American recording artist Dan Fogelberg, released in 1982 to capitalize on the singer-songwriter's growth in popularity following the mainstream success of his two prior albums, 1979's Phoenix and 1981's The Innocent Age. While the track list was mostly composed of his biggest hit songs spanning his decade-long career, this retrospective album also included two original tracks, "Missing You" and "Make Love Stay", both of which were released as singles and peaked at chart positions #23 and #29 on the Billboard Hot 100 chart, respectively. Both of the new songs made the Top 10 on the adult contemporary chart, with "Missing You" rising to #6 and "Make Love Stay" becoming the singer's third #1 on the AC chart.

== Track listing ==
All songs were written by Dan Fogelberg; all songs were produced by Fogelberg and Marty Lewis, unless stated otherwise.

No.	Title	Producer(s)	Length
1.	"Part of the Plan" (from Souvenirs, 1974)	Joe Walsh	3:18
2.	"Heart Hotels" (from Phoenix, 1979)	Dan Fogelberg; Norbert Putnam; Marty Lewis	4:14
3.	"Hard to Say" (from The Innocent Age, 1981)		3:59
4.	"Longer" (from Phoenix)		3:15
5.	"Missing You" (previously unreleased)		4:40
6.	"The Power of Gold" (from Twin Sons of Different Mothers, 1978)	Fogelberg; Tim Weisberg	4:30
7.	"Make Love Stay" (previously unreleased)		4:35
8.	"Leader of the Band" (from The Innocent Age)		4:17
9.	"Run for the Roses" (from The Innocent Age (Note: The album's liner notes mistakenly cite 1980, the year of this song's writing and recording, as its release year.))		4:16
10.	"Same Old Lang Syne" (standalone single, 1980 (Note: This song was released 9 months before The Innocent Age, serving as the album's lead single.))		5:19

== Charts ==
Album

Year	Chart	Position
1982/83	Australia Albums Chart	68

== Personnel ==
- Dan Fogelberg - lead vocals, backing vocals, electric guitar, acoustic guitar, Prophet V synthesizer, string arrangements
- Glen Spreen - string arrangements
- Kenny Passarelli, Norbert Putnam - bass guitar
- Sid Sharp - concertmaster
- Joe Vitale - drums
- Russ Kunkel - drums, congas
- Mike Hanna - keyboards, piano, synthesizer
- Joe Lala - percussion
- Al Garth - soprano saxophone
- Henry Diltz - photography
