= Dan Fogelberg Live: Greetings from the West =

Live album by Dan Fogelberg
- Released: October 22, 1991
- Recorded: June 1991
- Venue: Fox Theater (St. Louis, Missouri)
- Genre: Soft rock
- Length: 114:27
- Label: Full Moon
- Producer: Dan Fogelberg, Marty Lewis

Dan Fogelberg chronology
The Wild Places (1990)	Dan Fogelberg Live: Greetings from the West (1991)	River of Souls (1993)

Professional ratings
Review scores
Source	Rating
Allmusic	3.5/5 stars

Dan Fogelberg Live: Greetings from the West is a live album by American singer-songwriter Dan Fogelberg, released in 1991 (see 1991 in music). The album was recorded on June 25, 1991, at the Fox Theater, St. Louis, Missouri, United States.

== Track listing ==
All songs written by Dan Fogelberg, except where noted.

=== Disc one ===
1. "Aurora Nova" – 1:43
2. "The Wild Places" – 4:26
3. "Heart Hotels" – 4:18
4. "Over and Over" – 5:16
5. "Rhythm of the Rain" (John Gummoe) – 5:50
6. "The Spirit Trail" – 6:49
7. "Make Love Stay" – 5:56
8. "Old Tennessee" – 3:30
9. "Road Beneath My Wheels" – 6:54
10. "A Cry in the Forest" – 5:42
11. "Run for the Roses" – 5:25
12. "Believe in Me" – 4:01
13. "Leader of the Band" – 5:29

=== Disc two ===
1. "Twins Theme" – 2:41
2. "Intimidation" – 3:24
3. "The Power of Gold" – 8:57
4. "Lonely in Love" – 5:55
5. "Missing You" – 5:21
6. "Language of Love" – 3:55
7. "Part of the Plan" – 4:18
8. "Same Old Lang Syne" – 6:24
9. "There's a Place in the World for a Gambler" – 8:12

== Personnel ==
- Dan Fogelberg – lead vocals, keyboards, guitars
- Vince Melamed – keyboards, backing vocals
- Robert McEntee – keyboards, guitars, backing vocals
- Louis Cortelezzi – keyboards, percussion, flute, saxophone, woodwinds
- Jim Photoglo – bass, backing vocals
- Mike Botts – drums, percussion
- Tim Weisberg – flute

== Production ==
- Dan Fogelberg – producer, mixing
- Marty Lewis – producer, recording
- David Hewitt – recording, mixing
- John Hurley – mix assistant
- Carlos Grier – digital editing
- Denny Purcell – mastering at Georgetown Masters (Nashville, Tennessee)
- Henry Diltz – photography
