= Twin Sons of Different Mothers =

Studio album by Dan Fogelberg and Tim Weisberg
- Released: August 1978
- Recorded: 1978
- Studios: Record Plant (Sausalito); The Village (Westwood); Wally Heider (Los Angeles); United (Hollywood); A&M (Hollywood); Sunset Sound (Los Angeles)
- Genres: Rock, soft rock, jazz, classical
- Length: 34:32
- Labels: Full Moon, Epic
- Producers: Dan Fogelberg, Tim Weisberg

Dan Fogelberg and Tim Weisberg chronology
Twin Sons of Different Mothers (1978)	No Resemblance Whatsoever (1995)

Dan Fogelberg chronology
Nether Lands (1977)	Twin Sons of Different Mothers (1978)	Phoenix (1979)

Tim Weisberg chronology
Rotations (1978)	Twin Sons of Different Mothers (1978)	The Best of Tim Weisberg: Smile! (1979)

Singles from Twin Sons of Different Mothers
- 1. "Tell Me to My Face" Released: 1978; 2. "The Power of Gold" Released: 1978

Twin Sons of Different Mothers is a collaboration album by American singer-songwriter Dan Fogelberg and jazz flutist Tim Weisberg, released in 1978. It was the first of two collaborations between the pair; the second was No Resemblance Whatsoever.

The album peaked at number 8 on the Billboard 200, and at number 7 on the Cashbox Top 100 Albums. The album was a double-platinum seller. The closing track of the album, "The Power of Gold", was released as a single, reaching number 24 on the Billboard Hot 100 and number 51 in Canada.

== Background ==
American music journalist Paul Zollo wrote that Fogelberg, after the success of his album Nether Lands, wanted to make his next album "completely about music, without any commercial aspirations whatsoever". Having previously worked with Weisberg on Nether Lands, Fogelberg invited him to make the album a duet. At the time, they both had long hair and beards, so they decided to title the album Twin Sons of Different Mothers. The single "The Power of Gold" was added to the album at the last minute, due to the initial track they had planned to use having the piano out of tune with the orchestra, and it having to be redone. To avoid the cost of that endeavor, Fogelberg quickly penned "The Power of Gold", which was instead added to the album. Little did he know, Zollo opines, that the single would become one of the "biggest hits of his career".

Zollo also wrote that Fogelberg wasn't really optimistic about the success of the duo's album, and "expected it to be savagely attacked by the critics", so he flew to Europe with some friends before the album was released. He was astounded when he received an "excited call from his manager Irving Azoff informing him that the album had gone Top 20". Zollo goes on to say that Fogelberg figured "there was no sense in fighting it", so he then returned to the United States, and "went into the studio immediately to work on songs for his next album, Phoenix".

This album constitutes a collaboration, experimental in nature, between Tim and myself. It is an attempt for both of us to move outside our own recognizable boundaries and try new directions - new forms of music which we rarely get to explore on our own. It is a chance to stretch, an opportunity to grow and a hell of a lot of fun.

— Dan Fogelberg

== Critical reception ==
Professional ratings
Review scores
Source	Rating
AllMusic	3/5 stars
The New Rolling Stone Record Guide	2/5 stars

Cash Box said the album "combines the talents of two performers in an experimental way" and "interestingly blends the folk-rock, guitar flavored elements of Fogelberg's music with Weisberg's more airy, free-spirited, flute laden sound". They pointed to "Tell Me To My Face" and "The Power of Gold" as "standouts" on the LP. Madeline Kind of The Jerusalem Post Magazine, was blunt in her assessment of the album, calling it "rather boring".

Author Dave DiMartino from Billboard Books, highlighted the "extraordinary version" of the Hollies' "Tell Me to My Face", that "revealed an aspect of Fogelberg's rock roots that hasn't been on display since". In 2003, Blender rated Twin Sons of Different Mothers as the "worst CD" of Fogelberg's, with Fogelberg additionally being listed number 19 on "The 50 Worst Artists In Music History".

The San Francisco Bay Guardian said the album was "generally satisfying", remarking that Fogelberg "dominated most of the album", and praised the tracks "Hurtwood Alley" and "The Power of Gold" as "especially propelling". They also noted that the album had an "occasional tendency toward musical cliche". They criticized "Guitar Etude No. 3" as sounding like a "warped version of 'Girl From Ipanema'".

American music critic Dave Marsh wrote in The Rolling Stone Record Guide that the album reminded him of "smooth post-rock cocktail-lounge Muzak". He criticized Fogelberg for being "bland", but said Weisberg made up for it in "spades". He also said the "combination ought to be marked as an insomnia cure".

In 2001, French duo Daft Punk, along with American producer Todd Edwards, sampled the tracks ''Twins Theme'', ''Tell Me to My Face'' and ''Lahaina Luna'' on their song Face To Face from their album Discovery.

== Track listing ==
All tracks are written by Dan Fogelberg, except where noted.

No.	Title	Writer(s)	Length
1.	"Twins Theme"		1:29
2.	"Intimidation"		3:27
3.	"Lazy Susan"		2:36
4.	"Guitar Etude No. 3"		2:53
5.	"Tell Me to My Face"	Allan Clarke; Tony Hicks; Graham Nash	7:15
6.	"Hurtwood Alley"		2:48
7.	"Lahaina Luna"		3:15
8.	"Paris Nocturne"		3:34
9.	"Since You've Asked"	Judy Collins	2:41
10.	"The Power of Gold"		4:34

== Personnel ==
- Dan Fogelberg – acoustic piano (1, 2, 8–10), electric guitar (2, 3, 5–7, 10), percussion (2, 3, 7, 10), acoustic guitar (3, 5, 6, 10), classical guitar (4, 7), bass (3, 6), voices (3), lead vocals (5, 9, 10), ARP synthesizer (5), mandolin (5), slide guitar (5), backing vocals (5), string arrangements
- Tim Weisberg – flute (1–5, 7–10), piccolo (5, 7), percussion (6), oboe (8)
- Neil Larsen – electric piano (2, 7), acoustic piano (5)
- John Hug – zither (6)
- Willie Weeks – bass (2, 5, 7)
- Norbert Putnam – bass (10)
- Andy Newmark – drums (2, 4–7), Syndrum (7)
- Jim Keltner – drums (3, 10)
- Bobbye Hall – congas (2, 7), cowbell (2), percussion (4)
- Gary Coleman – percussion (9)
- Joe Lala – congas (10)
- David Breinenthal – bassoon (9)
- John Ellis – oboe (9)
- Earl Dumler – English horn (9)
- Vincent DeRosa – French horn (9)
- Ann Stockton – harp (9)
- Glen Spreen – string arrangements
- Don Henley – harmony vocals (5, 10)
- Florence Warner – backing vocals (10)

== Production ==
- Dan Fogelberg – producer
- Tim Weisberg – producer
- Marty Lewis – engineer, mixing
- Glenn Meadows – mastering
- John Kosh – art direction, design
- Norman Seeff – photography
- Front Line Management – management

Studios

- Recorded at Record Plant (Sausalito, California); A&M Studios and Sunset Sound (Hollywood, California); The Village Recorder, Wally Heider Recording Studios and United Studios (Los Angeles, California).
- Mixed at Quadraphonic Sound Studios (Nashville, Tennessee).
- Mastered at Masterfonics (Nashville, Tennessee).

== Charts ==
=== Weekly charts ===
Chart (1978)	Peak position
Australia (Kent Music Report)	81
Canada Top Albums/CDs (RPM)	22
US Billboard 200	8
Cashbox Top 100 Albums	7

=== Year-end charts ===
Chart (1979)	Position
US Billboard 200	57

== Certifications ==
Region	Certification	Certified units/sales
United States (RIAA)	2× Platinum	2,000,000^{^}
^{^} Shipments figures based on certification alone.

== See also ==
- Dan Fogelberg discography
- Tim Weisberg discography
