= Believe in Me (Dan Fogelberg song) =

Single by Dan Fogelberg

from the album Windows and Walls
- B-side: "Windows and Walls"
- Released: 1984
- Recorded: May 25, 1983
- Length: 4:56 (album version); 3:31 (single version)
- Label: Full Moon
- Songwriter(s): Dan Fogelberg
- Producer(s): Dan Fogelberg, Marty Lewis

Dan Fogelberg singles chronology
| "The Language of Love" (1984) | "Believe in Me" (1984) | "Sweet Magnolia and the Traveling Salesman" (1984) |

"Believe in Me" is the title of a popular song written and recorded by the American singer-songwriter Dan Fogelberg. The song appears on Fogelberg's eighth studio album Windows and Walls (1984).

== Song Background ==
When "Believe in Me" was recorded in May 1983, Fogelberg handled most of the musical creation himself, playing guitar and bass as well as recording his vocals; musician Mike Hanna (who played acoustic guitar on the track) was the only other performer in the studio. Fogelberg later described the song in the liner notes to a retrospective album: "One of my best love songs. Written at my old house in Nederland, Colorado, while building the ranch. Obviously, all was not well."

== Chart performance ==
Released as the second single from Windows and Walls, "Believe in Me" missed the Top 40 of the Billboard Hot 100 chart, where it peaked at No. 48. However, on the Billboard adult contemporary chart, where Fogelberg had enjoyed more consistent success, the song became his fourth No. 1 hit, following his earlier singles "Longer", "Leader of the Band", and "Make Love Stay".

== Charts ==
=== Weekly charts ===
| Chart (1984) | Peak position |
|---|---|
| US Billboard Hot 100 | 48 |
| US Adult Contemporary (Billboard) | 1 |

=== Year-end charts ===
| Chart (1984) | Position |
|---|---|
| US Adult Contemporary (Billboard) | 14 |

== See also ==
- List of number-one adult contemporary singles of 1984 (U.S.)
