= High Country Snows =

Studio album by Dan Fogelberg
- Released: 1985
- Recorded: 1985
- Genres: Country, country rock, bluegrass
- Length: 39:44
- Label: Full Moon/Epic
- Producers: Dan Fogelberg, Marty Lewis

Dan Fogelberg chronology
Windows and Walls (1984)	High Country Snows (1985)	Exiles (1987)

Singles from High Country Snows
- 1. "Go Down Easy" Released: 1985; 2. "Down the Road/Mountain Pass" Released: 1985

Professional ratings
Review scores
Source	Rating
AllMusic	4/5 stars

High Country Snows is the ninth album by American singer-songwriter Dan Fogelberg, released in 1985 (see 1985 in music). It featured many country and bluegrass star players.

== Track listing ==
All songs were written by Dan Fogelberg, unless stated otherwise.

No.	Title	Writer(s)	Length
1.	"Down the Road"	Lester Flatt; Earl Scruggs	0:27
2.	"Mountain Pass"		2:45
3.	"Sutter's Mill"		6:32
4.	"Wolf Creek"		2:52
5.	"High Country Snows"		4:42
6.	"The Outlaw"	Jay Bolotin	3:23
7.	"Shallow Rivers"		3:10
8.	"Go Down Easy"	Bolotin	3:52
9.	"Wandering Shepherd"		3:19
10.	"Think of What You've Done"	Carter Stanley	2:35
11.	"The Higher You Climb"		6:07

== Personnel ==
- Dan Fogelberg – lead vocals, acoustic guitar (2–11), harmony vocals (3, 6–8, 11), acoustic piano (5), electric guitar (6, 8, 11), handclaps (8), Kurzweil synthesizer (11)
- Michael Hanna – Yamaha DX7 (8)
- David Briggs – acoustic piano (11)
- Jerry Douglas – dobro (2, 3, 6, 7)
- David Grisman – mandola (2, 4), mandolin (4, 6, 7, 10)
- Doc Watson – acoustic guitar (4)
- Chris Hillman – mandolin (5), backing vocals (5)
- Al Perkins – pedal steel guitar (5, 11)
- Barry "Byrd" Burton – dobro (8)
- Emory Gordy Jr. – bass (2–8, 10, 11)
- Russ Kunkel – drums (2–8, 10, 11), tambourine (8), handclaps (8)
- Dan Murakami – handclaps (8)
- Charlie McCoy – harmonica (3, 7)
- Jim Buchanan – fiddle (2, 6, 7, 10)
- Herb Pedersen – harmony vocals (1, 7, 9), banjo (2–4, 6, 7, 10)
- Ricky Skaggs – harmony vocals (1, 2, 10)
- Vince Gill – harmony vocals (9)
- Anita Ball – backing vocals (11)
- Dianne Davidson – backing vocals (11)
- Tracy Nelson – backing vocals (11)

Production

- Producers – Dan Fogelberg and Marty Lewis
- Engineers – J.T. Cantwell, Terry Christian and Marty Lewis.
- Recorded at The Bennett House (Franklin, TN).
- Mixed at Sunset Sound (Los Angeles, CA).
- Mastered by George Marino at Sterling Sound (New York, NY).
- Art Direction and Design – Ron Larson and John Kosh
- Photography – Joel Bernstein

== Charts ==
Album – Billboard (United States)

Year	Chart	Position
1985	The Billboard 200	30
1985	Top Country Albums	23
1985	Australia Albums Chart	79

Singles – Billboard (United States)

Year	Single	Chart	Position
1985	"Down the Road"	Hot Country Singles & Tracks	33
1985	"Go Down Easy"	Adult Contemporary	6
1985	"Go Down Easy"	Hot Country Singles & Tracks	56
1985	"Go Down Easy"	The Billboard Hot 100	85
