= John Kosh =

English art director

- Also known as: Kosh
- Born: John Kosh; July 28, 1944 (age 82); London, England
- Occupation: Art Director / Album Cover Designer / Graphic Artist / Documentary Producer
- Years active: 1965–present
- Website: www.koshdesign.com

John Kosh (born July 28, 1944), known simply as Kosh, is an English art director, album cover designer, graphic artist, and documentary producer/director. He was born in London, England and rose to prominence in the mid-1960s while designing for the Royal Ballet and the Royal Opera House. He was the creative director of Apple Corps for The Beatles and was art director and album cover designer for Abbey Road and Let It Be, as well as other Apple artists.

== History ==
As art director of Art & Artists Magazine, he met the Beatles towards the end of the 1960s and was hired as Creative Director for Apple Records, where he was responsible for design, promotion and publicity. During this period he designed albums for a clientele that covered numerous British rock bands including the Rolling Stones. In 1969 Kosh handled the "War Is Over (if you want it)” campaign for John Lennon and Yoko Ono and created the Abbey Road, Let It Be and Who's Next album covers. During this period Kosh became well known in the London avant-garde art scene for designing and producing exhibitions, posters and books.

In 1973 after garnering several awards with the London Design & Art Directors Association he was elected to the British D&AD Jury before moving to Los Angeles. Once in L.A. he continued designing for various famous artists including: Jon Lord, Kim Carnes, Bonnie Raitt, Rod Stewart, Donovan, Jimmy Buffett, Bob Dylan, the Eagles, The Moody Blues, Dan Fogelberg, Carole King, Randy Newman, Pointer Sisters, T.Rex, Richard Pryor, Ringo Starr, Linda Ronstadt, Electric Light Orchestra, Bob Seger, Spinal Tap, W.A.S.P. James Taylor, Marvin Gaye, and Ike and Tina Turner. Kosh has garnered seven Grammy nominations and won three for his work with Linda Ronstadt. He is the only Art Director to have worked with The Beatles, The Rolling Stones and The Who.

He served as faculty member of Otis/Parsons Institute of Art and on the Board of Governors of the National Recording Academy. From approximately 1988 to 1993, Kosh was partner in the Los Angeles design studio Kosh Brooks Design, with fellow Art Director Larry Brooks. Kosh's client roster has included Capitol Records, Columbia-TriStar, Walt Disney Studios, Walt Disney Classics, Fox Television, The Gurin Company, CNN, MCA, MGM, the NFL (he designed the Super Bowl XXI logo), Sony Records and Warner Bros. Records. In 2009, the British Post Office (Royal Mail) issued commemorative stamps recognising the Beatles and their album covers. Two of them were Kosh's: Abbey Road and Let It Be.

== Personal life ==
John Kosh currently lives and works in Los Angeles with partner, wardrobe stylist and writer, Genevieve Schorr. He has one son, John Kosh Jr. (born in London ) in 1971.

== Works ==
A display of his more prominent graphics was exhibited at the Rock & Roll Hall of Fame Museum in Cleveland, Ohio.

- 10,000 Maniacs
  - 1987 "In My Tribe"
- Aerosmith
  - 1978 "Live! Bootleg"
  - 1979 "Night in the Ruts"
- Bad Company
  - 1976 "Run with the Pack"
- Badfinger
  - 1974 "Badfinger"
- The Beatles
  - 1969 "Abbey Road"
  - 1969 "The Ballad of John and Yoko"

single

  - 1970 "Let It Be"
- Jimmy Buffett
  - 1977 "Son of a Son of a Sailor"
  - 1989 "Off to See the Lizard"
  - 2002 "Far Side of the World"
  - 2003 "Meet Me in Margaritaville: The Ultimate Collection"
  - 2005 "Live at Fenway Park"
  - 2007 "Live at Wrigley Field"
  - 2009 "Buffet Hotel"
  - 2010 "encores"
- J. J. Cale
  - 1979 "5"
- Kim Carnes
  - 1982 "Voyeur"
- Donovan
  - 1973 Cosmic Wheels
  - 1973 "Essence to Essence"
- Eagles
  - 1976 "Hotel California"
    - No. 6 on Rolling Stone's 100 Best Album Covers of All Time
  - 1979 "The Long Run"
  - 1980 "Eagles Live"
  - 1982 "Eagles Greatest Hits, Vol. 2"
- Electric Light Orchestra
  - Designed the band's logo and these album covers
  - 1976 "A New World Record"
  - 1977 "Out of the Blue"
- Family
  - 1971 "Fearless"
- Dan Fogelberg
  - 1977 "Nether Lands"
  - 1978 "Twin Sons of Different Mothers"
  - 1979 "Phoenix"
  - 1980 "The Innocent Age"
  - 1984 "Windows and Walls"
  - 1990 "The Wild Places"
  - 1993 "River of Souls"
  - 1995 "No Resemblance Whatsoever"
- Marvin Gaye
  - 1978 "Here, My Dear"
- Humble Pie
  - 1972 "Smokin'"
  - 1973 "Eat It"
- King Crimson
  - 1974 "Red"
- John Lennon & Yoko Ono
  - 1968 "Life With the Lions"
  - 1969 "Wedding Album"
  - 1969 "Cold Turkey" single
  - 1969 'War is Over (If You Want It)' campaign and Christmas card
  - 1969 Plastic Ono Band "Give Peace a Chance" single
- John Lennon
  - 1970 "Instant Karma!" single
  - 1971 "Power to the People" single
- Jon Lord
  - 1976 Sarabande
- Linda Lewis
  - 1972 "Lark"
- Carole King
  - 1989 "City Streets"
  - 1993 "Colour of Your Dreams"
- McGuinness Flint
  - 1972 "McGuinness Flint"
- Kronos Quartet
  - 1988 "Winter Was Hard"
- Melissa Manchester
  - 1977 "Singin'"
  - 1978 "Don't Cry Out Loud"
- Steve Miller Band
  - 1986 "Living in the 20th Century"
- Martin Mull
  - 1978 "Sex and Violins"
- Randy Newman
  - 1988 "Land of Dreams"
  - 1995 "Randy Newman's Faust"
- Tom Petty and the Heartbreakers
  - 1978 "You're Gonna Get It!"
- Pointer Sisters
  - 1981 "Black & White"
  - 1982 "So Excited!"
- Richard Pryor
  - 1976 "Bicentennial Nigger"
- Bonnie Raitt
  - 1979 "The Glow"
- Ratt
  - 1991 "Ratt & Roll 81-91"
- REO Speedwagon
  - 1980 "Hi Infidelity"
  - 1982 "Good Trouble"
- Minnie Riperton
  - 1977 "Stay in Love"
- Rolling Stones
  - 1970 "Get Yer Ya-Ya's Out!"
  - 1971 "Through the Past, Darkly (Big Hits Vol. 2)"
- Linda Ronstadt
  - 1975 "Prisoner in Disguise"
  - 1976 "Hasten Down the Wind"
  - 1976 "Greatest Hits"
  - 1977 "Simple Dreams" – GRAMMY
  - 1977 "A Retrospective"
  - 1978 "Living in the USA"
  - 1980 "Mad Love"
  - 1981 "Greatest Hits, Volume 2"
  - 1982 "Get Closer"
    - GRAMMY; design & A/D w/Ron Larson
  - 1983 "What's New"
  - 1984 "Lush Life"
    - GRAMMY; design & A/D w/Ron Larson
  - 1986 "For Sentimental Reasons"
  - 1987 "Trio" (with Dolly Parton & Emmylou Harris)
    - Design & A/D w/Ron Larson
  - 1987 "Canciones de Mi Padre"
  - 1991 "Mas Canciones"
  - 1992 "Frenesi"
  - 1993 "Winter Light "
  - 1996 "Dedicated to the One I Love"
  - 1998 "We Ran"
  - 1999 "Box set Compilation"
  - 2000 "A Merry Little Christmas"
  - 2013 "Simple Dreams A Musical Memoir"
- Phil Spector
  - 1972 "A Christmas Gift for You"
- Ringo Starr
  - 1970 "Beaucoups of Blues"
  - 1976 "Ringo's Rotogravure"
  - 1977 "Ringo the 4th"
  - 1978 "Bad Boy"
  - 1981 "Stop and Smell the Roses"
- Rod Stewart
  - 1975 "Atlantic Crossing"
  - 1976 "A Night on the Town"
  - 1977 "Foot Loose & Fancy Free"
  - 1983 "Body Wishes"
- Spinal Tap
  - 1992 "Break Like the Wind"
    - Design & A/D with Larry Brooks
- Stone the Crows
  - 1972 "Ontinuous Performance"
- T. Rex (Marc Bolan)
  - 1973 "Tanx"
  - 1974 "Zinc Alloy and the Hidden Riders of Tomorrow"
  - 1975 "Bolan's Zip Gun"
- Andy Taylor
  - 1987 "Thunder"
- James Taylor
  - 1976 "Greatest Hits"
  - 1977 "JT"
  - 1979 "Flag"
  - 1981 "Dad Loves His Work"
- Koko Taylor
  - 1991 "I Got What It Takes"
- W.A.S.P.
  - 1989 "The Headless Children"
  - 1992 "The Crimson Idol"
  - 1997 "KFD"
  - 1999 "Helldorado"
  - 2001 "Unholy Terror"
  - 2002 "Dying For The World"
  - 2004 "The Neon God: Part 1 - The Rise"
  - 2004 "The Neon God: Part 2 - The Demise"
- The Who
  - 1971 "Who's Next"
- The Moody Blues
  - 1978 "Octave"

== Awards ==
Kosh is a seven-time Grammy nominee, and has won three of the awards:

- Grammy Awards of 1986 – John Kosh & Ron Larson (art directors) "Best Album Package 1984" for Lush Life performed by Linda Ronstadt
- Grammy Awards of 1983 – John Kosh & Ron Larson (art directors) "Best Album Package 1982" for Get Closer performed by Linda Ronstadt
- Grammy Awards of 1978 – John Kosh (art director) "Best Album Package 1977" for Simple Dreams performed by Linda Ronstadt

== Journey to the Ten Worlds ==
In 1995 Kosh and actor Susan Shearer formed Ten Worlds Entertainment. They directed the opening and closing sequences for the Emmy winning documentaries "When The Lion Roars—The MGM Story" and "In Search of Dr. Seuss" for Turner along with the 1992 through 1998 Billboard Awards telecasts for Fox TV. As production designers on the Showtime six-hour documentary, "Sex and the Silver Screen" with Raquel Welch, Kosh and Shearer recreated the look, lighting and film techniques of the 1960s back through the 1920s and teens. Ten Worlds was responsible for the title, set and production design for the CBS special "60 Years of Life Magazine" hosted by Candice Bergen. Ten Worlds also produced the elegant show logos and graphics for a series of TCM documentaries on glamorous film stars such as Louise Brooks, Rita Hayworth and Clara Bow. They designed the Warner Bros. 75th Anniversary Show, "Glorious Technicolor", hosted by Angela Lansbury, for TNT and the New Year's special, "Life Remembers for CBS". Ten Worlds achieved critical acclaim for their work on "The Last Days of Kennedy and King" for TBS and the ten-hour documentary "100 Years −100 Movies" for the America Film Institute and CBS. The Ten Worlds team designed "California Connected", a dynamic, weekly news program for PBS stations throughout California and "The Barrymores", a 90-minute special for A&E along with "Masters of Production" for PBS, chronicling the great Hollywood movie production designers.

In 2005, Kosh led Ten Worlds Entertainment into its evolution – becoming Ten Worlds Productions, Inc. Under its new name, it produced and directed a pilot for The History Channel, "Declassified: The Rise and Fall of the Wall", which sheds new light on the Berlin Wall. This pilot soon became a 13-part documentary series. The subjects of these documentaries focus on such figures as John Lennon, Fidel Castro, the Tet Offensive, Charles Lindbergh, Joseph Stalin and World War I.
