= Souvenirs (Dan Fogelberg album) =

Studio album by Dan Fogelberg
- Released: October 1974
- Studios: Record Plant, Los Angeles, California; Elektra, Los Angeles, California
- Genres: Soft rock, folk rock
- Length: 42:57
- Label: Full Moon/Epic
- Producer: Joe Walsh

Dan Fogelberg chronology
Home Free (1972)	Souvenirs (1974)	Captured Angel (1975)

Singles from Souvenirs
- 1. "Changing Horses" Released: 1974; 2. "Part of the Plan" Released: 1975

Professional ratings
Review scores
Source	Rating
AllMusic	3/5 stars
Christgau's Record Guide	C−

Souvenirs is the second studio solo album by the American rock singer-songwriter Dan Fogelberg. Joe Walsh produced the album and played on ten of the eleven tracks. The album was released in late 1974 on the label Epic Records. It reached No. 17 on the Billboard 200 in March 1975 and was certified double platinum by the RIAA.

== Reception ==
Reviewing retrospectively for AllMusic, critic Stephen J. Matteo wrote, "Dan Fogelberg expanded slightly on his sparse, countrified folk sound, adding a distinctively more pop feel, thanks to help from producer Joe Walsh."

== Track listing ==
All tracks are written by Dan Fogelberg.

No.	Title	Length
1.	"Part of the Plan"	3:18
2.	"Illinois"	4:15
3.	"Changing Horses"	2:36
4.	"Better Change"	3:10
5.	"Souvenirs"	4:33
6.	"The Long Way"	3:50
7.	"As the Raven Flies"	4:30
8.	"Song from Half Mountain"	2:55
9.	"Morning Sky"	2:49
10.	"(Someone's Been) Telling You Stories"	5:32
11.	"There's a Place in the World for a Gambler"	5:42
Total length:		42:57

== 50th Anniversary Edition ==
On April 4, 2025, Souvenirs (50th Anniversary Edition) was released digitally. The 180-gram vinyl, which was limited to 3,000 copies, was released on May 30, 2025. The digital version contains the standard album with four bonus tracks: a never heard before song and three alternate demos. "I Know A Thief" was released as a single on March 4, 2025. The vinyl edition includes a remaster from the original 1:1 analog tapes and a 16-page booklet featuring unreleased photographs taken by Henry Diltz, linear notes, and interviews from Diltz, Irving Azoff, Gerry Beckley, and more.

No.	Title	Length
1.	"Part of the Plan"	3:18
2.	"Illinois"	4:15
3.	"Changing Horses"	2:36
4.	"Better Change"	3:10
5.	"Souvenirs"	4:33
6.	"The Long Way"	3:50
7.	"As the Raven Flies"	4:30
8.	"Song from Half Mountain"	2:55
9.	"Morning Sky"	2:49
10.	"(Someone's Been) Telling You Stories"	5:32
11.	"There's a Place in the World for a Gambler"	5:42
12.	"I Know A Thief"	4:21
13.	"As The Raven Flies (Early Version)"	5:12
14.	"Illinois (Early Version)"	4:49
15.	"There's a Place in the World for a Gambler (Original Demo)"	6:04

== Personnel ==
- Dan Fogelberg – lead vocals, backing vocals, acoustic guitar, organ, acoustic piano (except on 9 and 10), electric guitar (1, 2, 7), vibraphone (2), percussion (8, 11), Moog synthesizer (8, 11), zither (11)
- Joe Walsh – electric 12-string guitar (1), acoustic 12-string guitar (1–4), electric 6-string guitar (2–11), ARP bass (5), backing vocals (6, 10)
- Gerry Beckley – acoustic guitar (11)
- Al Perkins – pedal steel guitar (2, 4), banjo (9)
- Russ Kunkel – drums (except on 4), congas (3), percussion (3)
- Don Henley – drums (4), backing vocals (4, 10)
- Joe Lala – congas (1), timbales (1), tambourine (4)
- Kenny Passarelli – bass, banjo (1–4, 7, 11), sousaphone (11)
- Bryan Garofalo – bass (6, 9, 10)
- Paul Harris – string arrangements (6), acoustic piano (9, 10)
- Jimmie Haskell – accordion (5), string quartet arrangement (5)
- Graham Nash – harmony vocals (1, 6)
- Glenn Frey – backing vocals (10)
- The Front Line Gardenia Choir (Don Henley, Randy Meisner, Jody Boyer and Marie Ouhrabka) – choir (11)

Production

- Producer – Joe Walsh
- Engineers – Allan Blazek, Fritz Richmond, John Stranoch and Bill Szymczyk
- Recorded at Record Plant and Elektra Sound Recorders (Los Angeles, CA).
- Mixing – John Stranoch
- Mastered by Rick Collins at Kendun Recorders (Burbank, CA).
- Art Direction and Design – Gary Burden
- Photography – Henry Diltz
- Inside Painting – Dan Fogelberg
- Direction – Irving Azoff

== Charts ==
Album – Billboard (United States)

Year	Chart	Position
1975	Pop Albums	17

Singles – Billboard (United States)

Year	Single	Chart	Position
1975	"Part of the Plan"	Pop Singles	31
