= Joe Lala =

American musician (1947–2014)

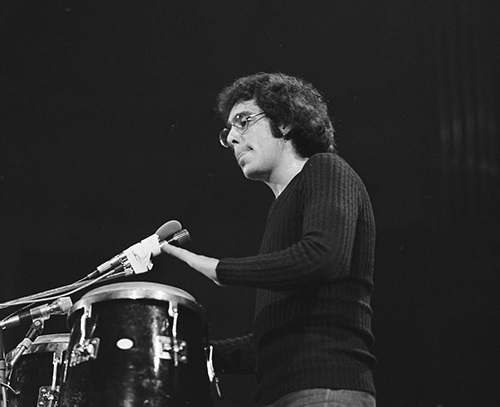
- Lala performing with Manassas on TopPop, 1972
- Born: Joseph Anthony Lala; November 3, 1947; Ybor City, Florida, U.S.
- Died: March 18, 2014 (aged 66); Tampa, Florida, U.S.
- Occupations: Musician; actor
- Years active: 1966–2014 (musician); 1977–2006 (acting)
- Spouse: Ginny McSwain (m. 1996; div. 2004)
- Musical career
- Genre: Rock
- Instruments: Percussion; vocals

Joseph Anthony Lala (November 3, 1947 – March 18, 2014) was an American musician and actor. In 1966, he co-founded the rock band Blues Image.

== Life and career ==
Lala was born in Ybor City, Tampa, Florida, into a family of Italian-American background. His father left the family when Joe was a child, so he was raised by his mother on her own. Lala's mother, Janie Cacciatore, an avid dancer, took her son to as many shows as she could. Lala spoke fluent Spanish and Italian.

He started out playing the drums in several Florida bands, before forming the band Blues Image. He also occasionally sang lead vocals, most notably on the song "Leaving My Troubles Behind". As a drummer and percussionist, he worked with The Byrds, Crosby, Stills, Nash & Young, Manassas, The Stills-Young Band, The Bee Gees, Whitney Houston, Joe Walsh, Andy Gibb and many others. Lala played the trademark congas that drove the Bee Gees' 1976 US chart-topper "You Should Be Dancing", subsequently included on the multi-million-selling Saturday Night Fever soundtrack. Lala provided the wide selection of percussive effects on Barbra Streisand's 1980 worldwide No. 1 album Guilty, and contributed to Whitney Houston's eponymous 1985 debut album.

Throughout his career, Lala accumulated 32 gold records and 28 platinum records. He played on the movie soundtracks of Saturday Night Fever, Staying Alive, D.C. Cab, Streets of Fire, All the Right Moves, Breathless, Defiance, The Lonely Guy and Airplane!. A severe case of carpal tunnel syndrome ended Lala's career as a percussionist. It kept him from performing full-time, but he continued to record with Stephen Stills, Graham Nash, the acoustic band Firefall, Dan Fogelberg, Dolly Parton, Rod Stewart and many others. Joe Lala was the last in the drummer stool for the handful of concerts given in February 1973 by the disintegrating Byrds.

He made the most of his Italian-American background and his mastery of Spanish, Cuban and Puerto Rican accents with TV roles in Miami Vice, General Hospital, Melrose Place, Seinfeld, Hunter, and Who's the Boss?, and starred in a summer replacement show named Knight & Daye. He portrayed another native of Ybor City, Dr. Ferdie Pacheco, in Ali: An American Hero, and co-starred with Andy Garcia in For Love or Country: The Arturo Sandoval Story. His films included Active Stealth, Sugar Hill, On Deadly Ground, Deep Sleep, Havana (with Robert Redford), Out for Justice, Marked for Death, Eyewitness to Murder, and Born in East L.A., plus many more.

Lala also guest-starred on several animated shows: Batman: The Animated Series, Pinky and the Brain, Quack Pack, The Angry Beavers, The Adventures of Jimmy Neutron, Boy Genius, Danger Rangers, ChalkZone, Johnny Bravo, Ozzy & Drix, Superman: The Animated Series, The New Woody Woodpecker Show, and many more. Additionally, he voiced Kun Lan in the 2005 video game Killer7.

Lala was married to voice director Ginny McSwain from 1996 until their divorce in 2004.

In the mid-2000s, Lala retired from acting to care for his mother, who had dementia. Lala coached young actors at the Italian Club in his native Ybor City. Joe Lala died from complications of lung cancer on March 18, 2014, at the age of 66.

== Filmography ==
=== Film ===
Year	Title	Role	Notes
1991	Out for Justice	Vermeer	
1997	Demolition University	Carlos Ramos	Direct-to-video
1998	Golgo 13: Queen Bee	Don Roccini, Gomez (voice)	English dub; direct-to-video
1999	Our Friend, Martin	Reporter, Demonstrator (voice)	Direct-to-video
1999	Active Stealth	Salvatore	Direct-to-video
1999	An American Tail: The Mystery of the Night Monster	Bootlick (voice)	Direct-to-video
2001	Monsters, Inc.	Augustus "Spike" Jones (voice)	
2002	The Hunchback of Notre Dame II	Guard (voice)	Direct-to-video

=== Television ===
Year	Title	Role	Notes
1995	Pinky and the Brain	Francois (voice)	Episode: "Napoleon Brainaparte"
1995	What-a-Mess	Additional Voices	3 episodes
1995	Seinfeld	Priest	Episode: "The Face Painter"
1996–1997	Superman: The Animated Series	Electrician, Maitre D' (voice)	2 episodes
1997	The Legend of Calamity Jane	Additional Voices	13 episodes
1998	Oh Yeah! Cartoons	Fox, Old Timer, Max (voice)	2 episodes
1999, 2002	Hey Arnold!	Miller, GIs, Cops (voice)	2 episodes
1999	The Angry Beavers	El Grapadura, Alien (voice)	Episode: "Norberto y Daggetto en El Grapadura y el Castor Malo"
1999	Johnny Bravo	Raoul (voice)	Episode: "Mama's New Boyfriend"
1999	Batman Beyond	Spike, Sailboat Captain (voice)	2 episodes
2001	Static Shock	Security Guard (voice)	Episode: "Replay"
2001	Time Squad	Leonardo da Vinci (voice)	Episode: "Daddio DaVinci"
2002	Samurai Jack	Owner, Engineer, Passenger, Baba Looey (voice)	Episode: "Couple on a Train"
2003	Ozzy & Drix	Hector's Dad (voice)	2 episodes
2004–2006	The Adventures of Jimmy Neutron, Boy Genius	Harp Estevez (voice)	4 episodes
2004–2005	The Batman	Crime Bosses, Bomb Technician (voice)	2 episodes
2005	All Grown Up!	Enrique, Doctor (voice)	Episode: "Dude, Where's My Horse?"
2005	Danger Rangers	Hector, Joey Clams, Raccoon Dad (voice)	Episode: "Water Works"
2006	W.I.T.C.H.	Guard, Mayor (voice)	Episode: "X is for Xanadu" (Final role)

=== Video games ===
Year	Title	Role	Notes
1992	It Came from the Desert	Koolman	
1999	Gabriel Knight 3: Blood of the Sacred, Blood of the Damned	Train Conductor, Vittorio Buchelli, Bartender	
2005	Killer7	Kun Lan	

== Collaborations ==
With Gypsy

- In the Garden (Metromedia Records – KMD 1044, 1971)

With Barbra Streisand

- Guilty (Columbia Records, 1980)

With Stephen Stills

- Manassas (Atlantic Records, 1972)
- Down the Road (Atlantic Records, 1973)
- Stills (Columbia Records, 1975)
- Illegal Stills (Columbia Records, 1976)
- Thoroughfare Gap (Columbia Records, 1978)
- Right by You (Atlantic Records, 1984)
- Man Alive! (Pyramid Records, 2005)

With Dionne Warwick

- Heartbreaker (Arista Records, 1982)

With David Crosby

- Oh Yes I Can (A&M Records, 1989)

With Joe Walsh

- The Smoker You Drink, the Player You Get (ABC Records, 1973)

With Dan Fogelberg

- Souvenirs (Epic Records, 1974)
- Nether Lands (Epic Records, 1977)
- Twin Sons of Different Mothers (Epic Records, 1978)
- The Innocent Age (Epic Records, 1981)
- Windows and Walls (Epic Records, 1984)
- Exiles (Epic Records, 1987)

With Don Felder

- Airborne (Asylum Records, 1983)

With Bill Wyman

- Monkey Grip (Atlantic Records, 1974)

With Ringo Starr

- Stop and Smell the Roses (RCA Records, 1981)

With Neil Diamond

- Beautiful Noise (Columbia Records, 1976)

With Jackson Browne

- Hold Out (Asylum Records, 1980)

With Kenny Rogers

- Eyes That See in the Dark (RCA Records, 1983)

With Graham Nash

- Earth & Sky (Capitol Records, 1980)
- Innocent Eyes (Atlantic Records, 1986)

With Neil Young

- Trans (Geffen, 1982)

With Rod Stewart

- A Night on the Town (Warner Bros. Records, 1976)

With Crosby, Stills, Nash & Young

- CSNY 1974 (Rhino Records, 2014)
