= Windows and Walls =

Studio album by Dan Fogelberg
- Released: 1984
- Studio: Caribou Ranch (Nederland, Colorado); Longview Farm (Brookfield, Massachusetts); Sunset Sound (Hollywood, California); The Plant (Sausalito, California)
- Genre: Rock, soft rock
- Length: 40:57
- Label: Full Moon, Epic
- Producer: Dan Fogelberg; Marty Lewis

Dan Fogelberg chronology
| Greatest Hits (1982) | Windows and Walls (1984) | High Country Snows (1985) |

Singles from Windows and Walls
- 1. "The Language of Love" Released: 1984; 2. "Believe in Me" Released: 1984; 3. "Sweet Magnolia and the Traveling Salesman" Released: 1984

Professional ratings
Review scores
| Source | Rating |
|---|---|
| AllMusic | 2/5 stars |

Windows and Walls is the eighth studio album by American singer-songwriter Dan Fogelberg, released in 1984 (see 1984 in music). The first single, "The Language of Love", reached No. 13 on the U.S. Billboard Hot 100 chart, making it his last Top 40 hit. Although the follow-up, "Believe in Me", missed the Top 40 of the pop chart, peaking at No. 48, it became the singer's fourth No. 1 song on the Billboard adult contemporary chart.

== Track listing ==
All songs were written by Dan Fogelberg.

| No. | Title | Length |
|---|---|---|
| 1. | "The Language of Love" | 3:43 |
| 2. | "Windows and Walls" | 4:56 |
| 3. | "The Loving Cup" | 5:00 |
| 4. | "Tucson, Arizona (Gazette)" | 8:36 |
| 5. | "Let Her Go" | 4:58 |
| 6. | "Sweet Magnolia (and the Traveling Salesman)" | 4:41 |
| 7. | "Believe in Me" | 4:36 |
| 8. | "Gone Too Far" | 4:31 |

== Personnel ==
- Dan Fogelberg – lead and backing vocals, acoustic guitar (1–3, 7), electric lead guitar (1, 3–5, 8), rhythm guitar (1, 3, 5, 8), percussion (1), acoustic piano (2, 6, 8), electric guitar (2), bass (2, 4, 6, 7), string arrangements (2), lead guitar (4), classical guitar (4), Roland Jupiter 8 (4), tambourine (5), electric piano (6), high-string guitar (7)
- Michael Hanna – acoustic piano (1, 3–5, 7), organ (1), keyboards (2), Prophet-5 (2), Roland Jupiter 8 (2–4, 8), chimes (2), string arrangements (2, 4, 6), electric piano (3, 5, 8)
- Gary Burden – pedal steel guitar (4)
- Dave Falkenberry – lap steel guitar (4), dobro (4)
- Kenny Passarelli – bass (1, 3)
- Charlie Fernandez – acoustic bass (4)
- Norbert Putnam – bass (5)
- Mike Porcaro – bass (8)
- Joe Vitale – drums (1, 3)
- Russ Kunkel – drums (4–6), castanets (4), congas (4), tape loop (4)
- Jeff Porcaro – drums (8), tambourine (8)
- Joe Lala – cowbell (1), tambourine (1), congas (4), triangle (4)
- Katharine Burden – cello (4), violin (4)
- Tom Scott – clarinet (6)
- Glen Spreen – string arrangements (7)
- Sid Sharp – concertmaster (2, 4, 6, 8)
- Timothy B. Schmit – harmony vocals (1), backing vocals (6)
- Max Gronenthal – backing vocals (3)

Production

- Producers – Dan Fogelberg and Marty Lewis
- Engineer – Marty Lewis
- Mastered by George Marino at Sterling Sound (New York, NY).
- Design – Kosh and Ron Larson
- Cover Photography – Marc Allen
- Sleeve Photography – Andy Katz

== Charts ==
Album – Billboard (United States)

| Year | Chart | Position |
|---|---|---|
| 1984 | The Billboard 200 | 15 |
| 1984 | Australia Albums Chart | 38 |

Singles – Billboard (United States)

| Year | Single | Chart | Position |
|---|---|---|---|
| 1984 | "The Language of Love" | Adult Contemporary | 14 |
| 1984 | "The Language of Love" | The Billboard Hot 100 | 13 |
| 1984 | "Believe in Me" | Adult Contemporary | 1 |
| 1984 | "Believe in Me" | The Billboard Hot 100 | 48 |
| 1984 | "Sweet Magnolia and the Travelling Salesman" | Adult Contemporary | 36 |
