= Nether Lands =

Studio album by Dan Fogelberg
- Released: May 1977
- Studio: Caribou Ranch, Nederland, Colorado; The Record Plant, Los Angeles and Sausalito; Quadraphonic Sound, Nashville; North Star, Boulder, Colorado
- Genre: Soft rock
- Length: 43:59
- Label: Full Moon/Epic
- Producer: Dan Fogelberg, Norbert Putnam

Dan Fogelberg chronology
Captured Angel (1975)	Nether Lands (1977)	Twin Sons of Different Mothers (1978)

Singles from Nether Lands
- 1. "Love Gone By" Released: 1977; 2. "Nether Lands" Released: 1977

Professional ratings
Review scores
Source	Rating
AllMusic	4.5/5 stars
The Rolling Stone Album Guide	2/5 stars

Nether Lands is the fourth album by American singer-songwriter Dan Fogelberg, released in 1977. The album title is a play on Nederland, Colorado, the location of one of the studios used to record the album.

== Track listing ==
All songs written by Dan Fogelberg.

1. "Nether Lands" – 5:32
2. "Once Upon a Time" – 3:38
3. "Dancing Shoes" – 3:28
4. "Lessons Learned" – 4:52
5. "Loose Ends" – 5:23
6. "Love Gone By" – 3:04
7. "Promises Made" – 3:18
8. "Give Me Some Time" – 3:20
9. "Scarecrow's Dream" – 4:10
10. "Sketches" – 3:32
11. "False Faces" – 4:52

== Personnel ==
- Dan Fogelberg – vocals, electric and acoustic pianos, ARP synthesizer, electric and acoustic guitars, orchestral arrangement (1), finger cymbals (3), pipe organ (5), organ (6), sleigh bells and harpsichord (9)
- Kenneth A. Buttrey – drums (2, 6–8, 11), percussion (8)
- Dominic Frontiere – orchestral arrangements and conductor (1, 11), arrangement (10)
- Don Henley – harmony vocals (2, 5, 6)
- Russ Kunkel – drums and congas (4)
- Joe Lala – congas (6)
- Frank Marocco – accordion (3)
- Norbert Putnam – bass guitar, string quartet arrangement (3)
- JD Souther – harmony vocals (5), backing vocals (11)
- John Stronach – maracas and tambourine (7)
- Joe Vitale – drums (5)
- Joe Walsh – rhythm electric guitar (5)
- Tim Weisberg – flute (8)

Production

- Produced by Dan Fogelberg and Norbert Putnam
- Engineer – John Stronach
- Mix-down Engineer – Marty Lewis
- Assistant Engineers – Jeff Guercio, Mark Guercio, John Henning, Marty Lewis, Bruce Hensal and Gary Landinsky.
- Recorded at:
  - Caribou Ranch, Nederland, Colorado
  - Record Plant Studios, Los Angeles, California
  - Quadrafonic Sound Studios, Nashville, Tennessee
  - Record Plant, Sausalito, California
  - North Star Studios, Boulder, Colorado
- Mastered by Glenn Meadows at Masterfonics, Inc., Nashville, Tennessee.

Other credits

- Photography by Andy Katz, Boulder, Colorado.
- Design by John Kosh
- Interior painting by Dan Fogelberg

== Charts ==
Album – Billboard (United States)

Year	Chart	Position
1977	Pop Albums	13
