= No Resemblance Whatsoever =

Studio album by Dan Fogelberg and Tim Weisberg
- Released: September 8, 1995
- Recorded: 1995
- Studio: Mountain Bird (Boulder, Colorado); A&M and Sunset Sound (Hollywood, California)
- Genre: Soft rock
- Length: 41:40
- Label: Giant
- Producer: Dan Fogelberg; Tim Weisberg

Dan Fogelberg and Tim Weisberg chronology
Twin Sons of Different Mothers (1978)	No Resemblance Whatsoever (1995)

Dan Fogelberg chronology
River of Souls (1993)	No Resemblance Whatsoever (1995)	The Very Best of Dan Fogelberg (2001)

Tim Weisberg chronology
Naked Eyes (1994)	No Resemblance Whatsoever (1995)	Undercover (1997)

Professional ratings
Review scores
Source	Rating
AllMusic	2/5 stars

No Resemblance Whatsoever is a collaboration album by American singer-songwriter Dan Fogelberg and jazz flutist Tim Weisberg, released in 1995. The cover art was a current picture of the two in a pose similar to that on the cover of their 1978 collaboration Twin Sons of Different Mothers. The album title was a comedic reference to the pair who once looked somewhat like brothers (per the album title of their last collaboration), but now not so much with their clean-shaven faces and the passage of 17 years. This particular album, according to Fogelberg, only took 10 days to record. Weisberg sued Fogelberg in 1997 claiming fraud and breach of contract over money Weisberg claimed was owed to him from the album sales and the subsequent tour.

== Track listing ==
All tracks are written by Dan Fogelberg, except where noted.

No.	Title	Writer(s)	Length
1.	"County Clare"		2:17
2.	"Forever Jung"		4:32
3.	"Todos Santos"		4:02
4.	"Sunlight"	Jesse Colin Young	4:32
5.	"Isle au Haut"		3:42
6.	"The Face of Love"		5:20
7.	"Songbird"	Young	4:44
8.	"Is This Magic"		3:09
9.	"Stasia"		3:10
10.	"Windward"		6:12

== Personnel ==
- Dan Fogelberg – lead vocals, backing vocals, grand piano, keyboards, acoustic guitar, electric lead guitar, classical guitar, strings (3, 9), bass (5)
- Tim Weisberg – flute, alto flute, bass flute, piccolo
- Larry Cohn – keyboards, horn arrangements (2), acoustic piano (3, 6), string arrangements (3, 9)
- Michael Landau – electric guitars
- Neil Stubenhaus – bass (1–4, 6–10)
- Vinnie Colaiuta – drums
- Alex Acuña – percussion
- Pete Christlieb – saxophones (2)
- Joel Peskin – saxophones (2)
- Tom Scott – saxophones (2)
- Dick Hyde – trombone (2), trumpet (2)
- Gary Grant – trumpet (2)
- Julia Tillman Waters – backing vocals (6)
- Maxine Willard Waters – backing vocals (6)
- Oren Waters – backing vocals (6)

Production

- Dan Fogelberg – producer
- Tim Weisberg – producer
- Elliot Scheiner – basic track recording
- David Glover – recording (vocals, keyboards, guitars)
- Marty Lewis – recording (all flutes)
- Mike Baumgartner – assistant engineer
- Mike Kloster – assistant engineer
- David Knight – assistant engineer
- Mike Nally – assistant engineer
- John Paterno – assistant engineer
- Mike Piersante – assistant engineer
- Don Murray – mixing
- Wally Traugott – mastering at Tower Mastering (Hollywood, California)
- John Kosh – art direction, design
- Henry Diltz – band photography
- Reisig & Taylor – cover photography
- Susie Chinn – llama photography
