= Missing You (Dan Fogelberg song) =

Single by Dan Fogelberg

from the album Greatest Hits
- B-side: "Hearts and Crafts"
- Released: October 1982
- Recorded: September 1982
- Genre: Soft rock, yacht rock
- Length: 3:59 (single version); 4:40 (album version)
- Label: Full Moon Records
- Songwriter(s): Dan Fogelberg
- Producer(s): Dan Fogelberg, Marty Lewis

Dan Fogelberg singles chronology
"Run for the Roses" (1982)	"Missing You" (1982)	"Make Love Stay" (1983)

"Missing You" is a song written and recorded by singer/songwriter Dan Fogelberg in 1981 at the Bennett House studios in Franklin, Tennessee with producer and Elvis Presley bassist Norbert Putnam and drummer Joe Vitale who was known for his work providing a Latin feel to recordings with Stephen Stills Manassas Band and on CSN's song Dark Star. Previously unreleased, Missing You was included on his Greatest Hits LP and released simultaneously.

"Missing You" peaked at number 23 on the Billboard Hot 100. It reached number 29 in Canada.

The song was a much bigger Adult Contemporary hit. It reached number 11 on the Canadian AC chart and number six on the U.S. chart.

== Chart performance ==
Chart (1982–83)	Peak position
Australia	55
Canadian RPM Top Singles	29
Canadian RPM Adult Contemporary Tracks	11
U.S. Billboard Hot 100	23
U.S. Billboard Adult Contemporary	6
