= The Innocent Age =

Studio album by Dan Fogelberg
- Released: August 1981
- Studios: North Star (Boulder, Colorado); Caribou Ranch (Nederland, Colorado); Rudy Records (Hollywood, California); Wally Heider's Studio 3 (Hollywood, California); Sunset Sound (Hollywood, California); Record Plant (Sausalito, California)
- Genre: Soft rock
- Length: 80:01
- Label: Full Moon/Epic
- Producers: Dan Fogelberg; Marty Lewis

Dan Fogelberg chronology
Phoenix (1979)	The Innocent Age (1981)	Greatest Hits (1982)

Singles from The Innocent Age
- 1. "Same Old Lang Syne" Released: November 1980; 2. "Hard to Say" Released: August 1981; 3. "Leader of the Band" Released: December 1981; 4. "Run for the Roses" Released: 1982

The Innocent Age is the seventh studio album and only double album by American singer-songwriter Dan Fogelberg, released in 1981. It was one of his most successful albums: three of his four Top 10 singles on the Billboard pop chart ("Hard to Say" (no. 7), "Same Old Lang Syne" (no. 9), and "Leader of the Band" (no. 9)) were from this album, as well as another Top 20 single in "Run for the Roses" (no. 18). All four also reached the Top 10 on the Billboard adult contemporary chart, with "Leader of the Band" reaching number 1 on that chart.

The album includes his song "Times Like These", from the 1980 Urban Cowboy soundtrack. Joni Mitchell, Emmylou Harris, Glenn Frey and Don Henley are prominent contributing vocalists.

The Innocent Age drew its inspiration from Thomas Wolfe's major novel Of Time and the River. The Innocent Age was originally released as a two-LP vinyl set and later as a two-disc CD set.

== Critical reception ==
Professional ratings
Review scores
Source	Rating
AllMusic	4.5/5 stars
The Rolling Stone Album Guide	2.5/5 stars

AllMusic retrospectively described the album as "beautifully orchestrated, imaginatively conceived, and obviously well thought out, it works as an artistic statement and also includes some of Fogelberg's most universally appealing and commercially successful music." The Rolling Stone Album Guide deemed the album "banal and overblown."

== Track listing ==
All tracks written by Dan Fogelberg, except where noted.

Disc 1
No.	Title	Length
1.	"Nexus"	6:04
2.	"The Innocent Age"	4:15
3.	"The Sand and the Foam"	4:19
4.	"In the Passage"	6:28
5.	"Lost in the Sun"	3:53
6.	"Run for the Roses"	4:18
7.	"Leader of the Band (concludes with an excerpt from "The Washington Post" march arranged by Lawrence Peter Fogelberg, performed by the UCLA Band)"	4:48
8.	"Same Old Lang Syne"	5:21

Disc 2
No.	Title	Writer(s)	Length
1.	"Stolen Moments"		3:12
2.	"The Lion's Share"		5:10
3.	"Only the Heart May Know" (duet with Emmylou Harris)		4:09
4.	"The Reach"		6:30
5.	"Aireshire Lament"		0:52
6.	"Times Like These" (from the 1980 Urban Cowboy Soundtrack)		3:02
7.	"Hard to Say"		4:00
8.	"Empty Cages"	Fogelberg, Russ Kunkel, Norbert Putnam, Michael Utley	6:24
9.	"Ghosts"		7:16

== Personnel ==
- Dan Fogelberg – lead vocals (1, 2, 4–6, 8–10, 12, 14, 17), backing vocals (1, 2, 4–6, 8–10, 12, 14), acoustic guitars (1–3, 5, 7, 9–12, 14–16), electric guitars (1, 2, 4, 5, 9, 10, 12, 14), Coral electric sitar (1), bass (1, 2, 6, 8, 14), percussion (1, 9, 14, 16), acoustic piano (2, 4, 6, 8, 10, 14, 17), tambourine (2), vocals (3, 7, 11, 15, 16), electric piano (4, 8, 16, 17), Minimoog (4), Prophet-5 (4, 10, 13), cowbell (5), lap steel guitar (9), ARP String Ensemble (10, 13), tack piano (11), ship's bell (12), bowed psaltery (13), electric lead and rhythm guitars (15–17), hammered dulcimer (17)
- Mike Finnigan – organ (4, 5, 10)
- Michael Utley – acoustic piano (12, 16), electric piano (15)
- Al Perkins - pedal steel guitar (6, 11)
- Kenny Passarelli – bass (4, 5, 10, 17), broken twigs (10)
- Norbert Putnam – bass (9, 12, 15, 16)
- Russ Kunkel – drums (1, 2, 4–6, 8–10, 12, 14–17), cymbals (4), congas (15), timbales (15), percussion (16)
- Don Alias – African drums (1), congas (1), cowbell (1), güiro (1), shakers (1)
- Marty Lewis – tambourine (9), additional percussion (14)
- Joe Lala – congas (16), timbales (16)
- Jimmie Fadden – harmonica (6)
- Michael Brecker – soprano saxophone (8), tenor saxophone (10)
- Tom Scott – tenor saxophone (15)
- Jerry Hey – piccolo trumpet (12), trumpet (12)
- David Duke – French horn (12)
- Jesse Ehrlich – cello (3)
- Gayle Levant – harp (3), Celtic harp (13), concert harp (13)
- Sid Sharp – violin (13)
- Glen Spreen – brass quintet arrangements (7a)
- UCLA band – orchestra (7b)
- Lawrence Fogelberg – orchestral arrangements (7b)
- Joni Mitchell – vocal descant (1)
- Heart of Darkness Chorale – choir (1)
- Richie Furay – harmony vocals (2)
- Don Henley – harmony vocals (10)
- Emmylou Harris – vocals (11)
- Mike Brewer – harmony vocals (12)
- Glenn Frey – harmony vocals (15)
- Chris Hillman – harmony vocals (16)
- Sid's Raiders – choir (17)
- Marc Gottesman – choir director (17)

Production

- Dan Fogelberg – producer, cover photography
- Marty Lewis – producer, engineer, mixing
- Kosh – cover design
- Andy Katz – cover photography, liner photography
- David Awells – liner notes
- Thomas Wolfe – text

== Charts ==
=== Album ===
Chart (1982)	Peak position
U.S. Billboard 200	6
Australia Albums Chart	38

Year End Chart (1982)	Peak position
U.S. Billboard 200	19

=== Singles ===
Single	Chart	Position
"Same Old Lang Syne"	Adult Contemporary	8
"Same Old Lang Syne"	Pop Singles	9
"Hard to Say"	Adult Contemporary	2
"Hard to Say"	Pop Singles	7
"Lost in the Sun"	Mainstream Rock	45
"Leader of the Band"	Adult Contemporary	1
"Leader of the Band"	Pop Singles	9
"Run for the Roses"	Adult Contemporary	3
"Run for the Roses"	Pop Singles	18
