= The Wild Places (Dan Fogelberg album) =

Studio album by Dan Fogelberg
- Released: 1990
- Studio: Mountain Bird (Boulder, Colorado); Lahaina Sound Recording (Maui, Hawaii); Sunset Sound (Hollywood, California)
- Genre: Soft rock
- Length: 52:04
- Label: Full Moon/Epic
- Producer: Dan Fogelberg

Dan Fogelberg chronology
Exiles (1987)	The Wild Places (1990)	Dan Fogelberg Live: Greetings from the West (1991)

The Wild Places is an album by the American musician Dan Fogelberg, released in 1990. Fogelberg's tour in support of the album included talks from The Wilderness Society about the preservation of nature.

== Production ==
"Bones in the Sky" is a tribute to Georgia O'Keeffe. "Lovers in a Dangerous Time" is a cover of the Bruce Cockburn song. Fogelberg considered The Wild Places to be a concept album about the environment and ecology.

== Critical reception ==
Professional ratings
Review scores
Source	Rating
AllMusic	2/5 stars
Calgary Herald	B
Chicago Tribune	2/4 stars

The Calgary Herald called the album "a heartfelt, sincere recording with lots of pleasing melodies." The Chicago Tribune praised "Lovers in a Dangerous Time", but concluded that "everything else should be avoided unless you're wearing crystals while riding in an elevator."

== Track listing ==
All songs written by Dan Fogelberg, except as indicated

1. "Aurora Nova" – 1:37
2. "The Wild Places" – 4:44
3. "Forefathers" – 4:56
4. "Song of the Sea" – 5:38
5. "Anastasia's Eyes" – 3:58
6. "Blind to the Truth" – 6:17
7. "Lovers in a Dangerous Time" (Bruce Cockburn) – 4:50
8. "Rhythm of the Rain" (John Gummoe)* – 4:24
9. "Bones in the Sky" – 3:52
10. "The Spirit Trail" – 5:59
11. "Ever On" – 5:49
- includes uncredited interpolation of "Rain" (John Lennon, Paul McCartney)

== Personnel ==
- Dan Fogelberg – lead vocals, acoustic piano, keyboards, synthesizers, guitars, drum programming, percussion, string arrangements (5)
- Mike Finnigan – organ (10)
- Michael Landau – guitars (4, 6)
- Bob Glaub – bass (2–4, 8, 10, 11)
- George Hawkins – bass (6)
- Russ Kunkel – drums (1–4, 6, 8, 10, 11), percussion (1, 10, 11)
- Lenny Castro – congas (6), timbales (6), percussion (6, 11)
- Al Garth – soprano saxophone (4), tenor saxophone (8)
- Jerry Hey – trumpet (6)
- Heart Attack Horns – horns (8)
- Timothy B. Schmit – backing vocals (2, 4, 10)
- David Crosby – backing vocals (4)
- Julia Waters – harmony vocals (6, 8)
- Maxine Waters – harmony vocals (6, 8)
- Oren Waters – harmony vocals (6, 8)
- Sara K – backing vocals (7)

Production

- Executive Producer – Remington Boone
- Producer – Dan Fogelberg
- Engineers – Dan Fogelberg, Marty Lewis, Dave Reynolds and Duane Scott.
- Mixed by Dan Fogelberg and Marty Lewis at The Complex Studios (Los Angeles, CA).
- Mix Assistants – Mike Kloster and Brett Swain
- Mastered by Stephen Marcussen at Precision Mastering (Hollywood, CA).
- Production Coordination – Nina Avramides-Berducat and Charlie Fernandez
- Art Direction and Design – Amy Dakos and John Kosh
- Cover Illustration – Amy Dakos
- Photography – Andy Katz and Anastasia Savage

== Charts ==
Album – Billboard (United States)

Year	Chart	Position
1990	The Billboard 200	103

Singles – Billboard (United States)

Year	Single	Chart	Position
1990	"Rhythm of the Rain"	Adult Contemporary	3
1991	"Anastasia's Eyes" (album cut)	Adult Contemporary	32
