= Exiles (Dan Fogelberg album) =

Studio album by Dan Fogelberg
- Released: 1987
- Studios: One On One (North Hollywood, California); Sunset Sound (Hollywood, California); Record One (Sherman Oaks, California); Lahaina Sound Recording (Maui, Hawaii)
- Genre: Soft rock
- Length: 40:58
- Label: Full Moon/Epic
- Producers: Dan Fogelberg; Russ Kunkel

Dan Fogelberg chronology
High Country Snows (1985)	Exiles (1987)	The Wild Places (1990)

Singles from Exiles
- 1. "She Don't Look Back" Released: May 1987; 2. "Lonely in Love" Released: 1987; 3. "Seeing You Again" Released: 1987

Exiles is an album by the American musician Dan Fogelberg, released in 1987. It includes the A/C hits "Lonely in Love" and “Seeing You Again” and the pop hit "She Don't Look Back". Fogelberg supported the album by touring with Wendy Waldman.

== Production ==
Fogelberg spent two years writing the songs, which were inspired by his divorce. The Tower of Power horns played on "What You're Doing". In an interview around the album's release, Fogelberg described Exiles as a return to a more rock-oriented sound following the bluegrass-influenced direction of his previous album, High Country Snows. He said the album featured more electric guitar and described it as the most rock and roll-oriented album he had made.

== Reception ==
Professional ratings
Review scores
Source	Rating
AllMusic	2/5 stars
The Rolling Stone Album Guide	2.5/5 stars

The Ottawa Citizen noted that, "as with any mellow musician who turns up the volume, Fogelberg now claims he has been a closet rock and roller all along." The Cincinnati Post wrote: "The title song recalls Springsteen, featuring an anguished, Michael Brecker tenor sax solo that's pure Clarence Clemons. 'What Your Doing' is solid soul, with Fogelberg doing his best Otis Redding, backed by a girl group and the Tower of Power horn section. For ballad fans, there's the gentle pop of 'Seeing You Again' and the solo voice and piano of 'Hearts in Decline'. Breaking up is hard to do, but Fogelberg should find some solace in LP sales. Exiles is custom made for his millions of adult rock fans."

The Toronto Star wrote that "Fogelberg's phony soul inflections on 'What You're Doing' are barely short of laughable." The Indianapolis News wrote that "Dan Fogelberg's "Exiles" (Full Moon-Epic) is an album-long look at the downside of love, and it's a strong record."The Washington Post called "Lonely in Love" "a soulless string of bromides with a twist of tenor sax supplied by designated-soulman Michael Brecker." The Morning Call listed the album among the worst of 1987. The Boston Globe said, "After a three year hiatus from rock 'n' roll and a brief foray onto country music turf, this Colorado recluse returns with a blazing vengeance."

== Track listing ==
All tracks composed by Dan Fogelberg, except where indicated

1. "Exiles" – 4:13
2. "What You're Doing" – 4:52
3. "Lonely in Love" – 5:30
4. "Seeing You Again" – 5:00
5. "She Don't Look Back" – 4:49
6. "The Way It Must Be" – 4:17
7. "Hearts in Decline" – 3:14
8. "It Doesn't Matter" (Chris Hillman, Stephen Stills) – 4:32
9. "Our Last Farewell" – 4:50
10. "Beyond the Edge" – 3:46 (Not included on the original LP)

== Personnel ==
- Dan Fogelberg – lead vocals, backing vocals (1, 3–9), electric guitar (1, 3, 5, 8, 9), acoustic piano (2–4, 7, 9), lead guitar (2, 5, 8, 9), vibraphone (2), horn arrangements (2), acoustic guitar (3, 6, 8, 9), synth guitar (3), synthesizers (4, 9), rhythm guitar (5, 8, 9), drum programming (5), string arrangements
- Mike Hanna – keyboards (1–6, 8, 9), string arrangements
- Michael Landau – rhythm guitar (2), electric guitar (3, 4, 6)
- Mike Porcaro – bass (1, 4, 5, 9)
- Bob Glaub – bass (2, 3, 8)
- Larry Klein – bass (6)
- Russ Kunkel – drums (1–4, 9), percussion (2, 3, 5), drum programming (5)
- Niko Bolas – drum programming (5)
- Andy Newmark – drums (6)
- Rick Marotta – drums (8)
- Joe Lala – percussion (8)
- Michael Brecker – tenor saxophone (1, 3)
- Tower of Power – horn arrangements (2)
- Julia Waters – backing vocals (2)
- Maxine Waters – backing vocals (2)
- Oren Waters – backing vocals (2)

Production

- Producers – Dan Fogelberg and Russ Kunkel
- Assistant producer – Charlie Fernandez
- Recorded and mixed by Niko Bolas
- Mix assistant – Dave Glover
- Mastered by George Marino at Sterling Sound (New York, NY).
- Art direction – Kurt Calcagno and George Osaki
- Cover art concept – Dan Fogelberg
- Photography – Wayne Maser and Levon Parian

== Charts ==
Album

Year	Chart	Position
1987	The Billboard 200	48
1987	Australia Albums Chart	80

Singles – Billboard (North America)

Year	Single	Chart	Position
1987	"Lonely in Love"	Adult Contemporary	2
1987	"Seeing You Again"	Adult Contemporary	15
1987	"She Don't Look Back"	Mainstream Rock Tracks	13
1987	"She Don't Look Back"	The Billboard Hot 100	84
