= Phoenix (Dan Fogelberg album) =

Studio album by Dan Fogelberg
- Released: November 1979
- Recorded: November 1978 – October 1979
- Studio: North Star (Boulder, Colorado); Quadraphonic (Nashville, Tennessee); Bayshore (Coconut Grove, Florida); The Village Recorder (Los Angeles, California); Record Plant (Sausalito, California); United (Hollywood, California)
- Genre: Rock
- Length: 42:56
- Label: Full Moon/Epic
- Producer: Dan Fogelberg; Norbert Putnam; Marty Lewis

Dan Fogelberg chronology
Twin Sons of Different Mothers (1978)	Phoenix (1979)	The Innocent Age (1981)

Singles from Phoenix
- 1. "Face the Fire" Released: 1979; 2. "Longer" Released: 1979; 3. "Beggar's Game" Released: 1980; 4. "Heart Hotels" Released: 1980

Phoenix is the sixth studio album by the American singer-songwriter Dan Fogelberg, released in 1979. It was produced primarily by Fogelberg and Norbert Putnam.

== Critical reception ==
Professional ratings
Review scores
Source	Rating
AllMusic	4.5/5 stars
The Encyclopedia of Popular Music	4/5 stars
MusicHound Rock: The Essential Album Guide	2/5 stars
The Rolling Stone Album Guide	2/5 stars

The Sacramento Bee called the album "an assemblage of alleged rockers and tedious love ballads." The Austin American-Statesman determined that "the string sections are overused and most tracks are overdubbed with an unnecessary number of guitars."

== Track listing ==
All songs written by Daniel Fogelberg.

No.	Title	Length
1.	"Tullamore Dew"	1:16
2.	"Phoenix"	7:06
3.	"Gypsy Wind"	3:59
4.	"The Last to Know"	3:11
5.	"Face the Fire"	5:39
6.	"Wishing on the Moon"	4:32
7.	"Heart Hotels"	4:15
8.	"Longer"	3:15
9.	"Beggar's Game"	5:00
10.	"Along the Road"	4:34

== Personnel ==
- Dan Fogelberg – Prophet-5 (1, 2, 9, 10), guitars (1), percussion (1, 9), lead vocals (2–4, 6, 7, 9, 10), backing vocals (2–4, 6, 7, 9, 10), acoustic guitar (2–4, 6, 8–10), electric guitars (2–7, 9), antique ankle bells (3), electric piano (4, 7), pedal steel guitars (4), vocals (5, 8), acoustic piano (5–7, 9), slide guitar (6), bass (10), orchestral arrangements
- Paul Harris – acoustic piano (2)
- Michael Utley – organ (2, 5)
- Joe Walsh – musical assistance (5)
- Norbert Putnam – bass (2–9)
- Andy Newmark – drums (2–4, 7, 9)
- Russ Kunkel – drums (5, 6), congas (7)
- Kenny Buttrey – percussion (3)
- Jody Linscott – congas (4)
- Marty Lewis – tambourines (5)
- Tom Scott – saxophone (7), lyricon solo (7)
- Jerry Hey – flugelhorn solo (8)
- Gayle Levant – harp (8)
- Glen Spreen – orchestral arrangements
- Sid Sharp – concertmaster

Production

- Dan Fogelberg – producer, cover
- Norbert Putnam – producer
- Marty Lewis – producer, engineer, mixing
- Jeff Guercio – engineer
- Glenn Meadows – mastering at Masterfonics (Nashville, Tennessee)
- Kosh – art direction, design
- Andy Katz – sleeve photography
- Norman Seeff – sleeve photography

== Chart performance ==
Weekly Charts

Chart	Position
US Billboard Pop Albums	3
Australia Albums Chart	27
UK Albums Chart	42

Year End Charts (1980)

Chart	Position
US Billboard Pop Albums	15

Charting Singles – Billboard (North America)

Single	Chart	Position
"Longer"	Pop Singles	2
"Longer"	Adult Contemporary	1
"Heart Hotels"	Pop Singles	21
"Heart Hotels"	Adult Contemporary	3
