= Make Love Stay =

Single by Dan Fogelberg

from the album Greatest Hits
- B-side: "Hearts and Crafts"
- Released: January 1983
- Recorded: 1982
- Genre: Pop, adult contemporary
- Length: 4:32
- Label: Full Moon Records
- Songwriter(s): Dan Fogelberg
- Producer(s): Dan Fogelberg, Marty Lewis

Dan Fogelberg singles chronology
| "Missing You" (1982) | "Make Love Stay" (1983) | "The Language of Love" (1984) |

"Make Love Stay" is a song written and recorded by American singer-songwriter Dan Fogelberg, and released as a single in January 1983. It was one of two new songs included on his 1982 greatest hits album, along with the song "Missing You".

Fogelberg later described "Make Love Stay" in the liner notes to a retrospective album as a "sinuous piece written around a chapter of Tom Robbins' Still Life with Woodpecker" and as "a musical question that, unfortunately, eludes me still."

"Make Love Stay" peaked at No. 29 on the US Billboard Hot 100 chart in March 1983. It was Fogelberg's third song to top the Billboard Adult Contemporary chart, following his earlier hits "Longer" and "Leader of the Band".

== Chart performance ==
| Chart (1983) | Peak position |
|---|---|
| Canadian RPM Adult Contemporary | 1 |
| US Billboard Adult Contemporary | 1 |
| US Billboard Hot 100 | 29 |

== See also ==
- List of number-one adult contemporary singles of 1983 (U.S.)
