= River of Souls =

Studio album by Dan Fogelberg
- Released: September 28, 1993
- Recorded: c.1993
- Studio: Mountain Bird (Boulder, Colorado); Sunset Sound, (Hollywood, California)
- Genre: Soft rock, folk, pop rock
- Length: 52:28
- Label: Full Moon
- Producer: Dan Fogelberg

Dan Fogelberg chronology
Dan Fogelberg Live: Greetings from the West (1991)	River of Souls (1993)	No Resemblance Whatsoever (1995)

Singles from River of Souls
- 1. "Magic Every Moment" Released: 1993

Professional ratings
Review scores
Source	Rating
AllMusic	2/5 stars

River of Souls is the twelfth album by American singer-songwriter Dan Fogelberg, released in September 1993. The album features a variety of genres ranging from Celtic, Brazilian, country, and African soft rock. It received mostly positive reviews from fans and critics alike, praising the instrumentation and vocals. However, some of the song's topics, which included war and politics, were not well received.

== Background ==
In a 1994 interview, Fogelberg remarked that "some people have said this album is really different from what I've done before, but to me it's just songwriting. I didn't set out to do world-beat music or anything like that. These songs just demanded a different treatment."

Fogelberg described the album as "pessimism tempered with deeper spiritual optimism" and "eclectic," and said his songwriting influences were Canadian singer Bruce Cockburn and South African Johnny Clegg, both of whom incorporated political concerns into their works. River of Souls addresses concerns about the environment in "Holy Road", and the homeless in "Faces of America", and war in "A Voice for Peace".

Fogelberg said he tried to make it a "real musical album," and that for "The Minstrel," a song about sailing, he brought in penny whistles and a Celtic harp to give the song a British folk feel. He also noted that he wrote "Serengeti Moon" about 10 years ago, before Paul Simon's "Graceland" came out, and "thought, what am I going to do with this?"

Fogelberg said he worked on the album for three years. He recorded the album at Mountain Bird Studios in Colorado, and Sunset Sound Recorders in California.

== Track listing ==
All songs written by Dan Fogelberg.

1. "Magic Every Moment" – 4:22
2. "All There Is" – 4:34
3. "The Minstrel" – 4:42
4. "Faces of America" – 6:09
5. "Holy Road" – 6:01
6. "Serengeti Moon" – 4:45
7. "Higher Ground" – 5:50
8. "A Love Like This" – 3:57
9. "River of Souls" – 6:11
10. "A Voice for Peace" – 5:51

== Personnel ==
- Dan Fogelberg – vocals, keyboards (1, 3, 6, 7, 10), acoustic guitars (1, 2, 4, 5), bass (1, 3–7), synth steel drums (1), horn arrangements (1, 5), electric guitars (2, 4, 8), percussion (2, 4, 6, 7, 10), acoustic piano (3, 5, 6, 8, 10), "loon" (3), Hammond B3 organ (4), mandolin (4), drum programming (4–8, 10), cymbals (5, 9), cowbell (5), sampling (7), lead guitar (8, 10), synth flute (9), synth strings (9), classical guitars (9), brush cymbals (9), jawbone (9), rhythm guitars (10)
- Vince Melamed – synth marimba (1)
- Michael Hanna – keyboards (2)
- Mike Finnigan – Hammond B3 organ (5, 10)
- Bill Payne – acoustic piano (9)
- Robert McEntree – electric guitar (7, 8)
- Larry Klein – fretless bass (2), bass (9)
- Mike Porcaro – bass (2)
- Bob Glaub – bass (8, 10)
- Mike Botts – drums (1), shaker (1), bass drum (3), hi-hat (3), cymbals (8, 10)
- Russ Kunkel – drums (2, 4), cymbals (3, 6, 7)
- Carlos Vega – drums (7)
- Lenny Castro – congas (1, 5), shaker (1), timbales (5)
- Alex Acuña – congas (2, 9), udu (2, 9, shaker (9), triangle (9), woodblock (9), magic sounds (9)
- Pam Boulding – hammered dulcimer (3)
- Bill Bergman – saxophone (1, 5), horn arrangements (1, 5)
- Stephen "Doc" Kupka – baritone saxophone (1, 5)
- Dennis Farias – trumpet (1, 5)
- Daniel Fornero – trumpet (1, 5)
- Philip Boulding – pennywhistle (3), Celtic harp (3)
- Gene Elders – fiddle (4)
- David Campbell – orchestra arrangements (3), conductor (3, 8), string arrangements (8)
- Julia Tillman Waters – backing vocals (5, 7)
- Oren Waters – backing vocals (5–7)
- Maxine Willard Waters – backing vocals (5–7)
- Maxine Anderson – backing vocals (6)
- Ronald Kunene – backing vocals (6)
- Abner Mariri – backing vocals (6)
- Lebohang Morake – backing vocals (6)
- Josef Powell – backing vocals (6)

Production

- Remington Buckaroo Boone – executive producer
- Dan Fogelberg – producer, engineer
- Marty Lewis – engineer
- Dave Reynolds – engineer
- Elliot Scheiner – engineer, mixing
- James Tuttle – engineer
- Neal Avron – assistant engineer
- Anastasia Fogelberg – assistant engineer
- David Glover – assistant engineer
- Mike Kloster – assistant engineer
- Kevin Nimmo – assistant engineer
- George Strakis – assistant engineer
- Tom Winslow – mix assistant
- Denny Purcell – mastering at Georgetown Masters (Nashville, TN)
- John Kosh – art direction, design
- Brian Wittman – art direction, design
- Henry Diltz – photography

== Charts ==
Chart (1993)	Peak position
US Billboard 200	164
