= Irving Azoff =

American entertainment executive (born 1947)

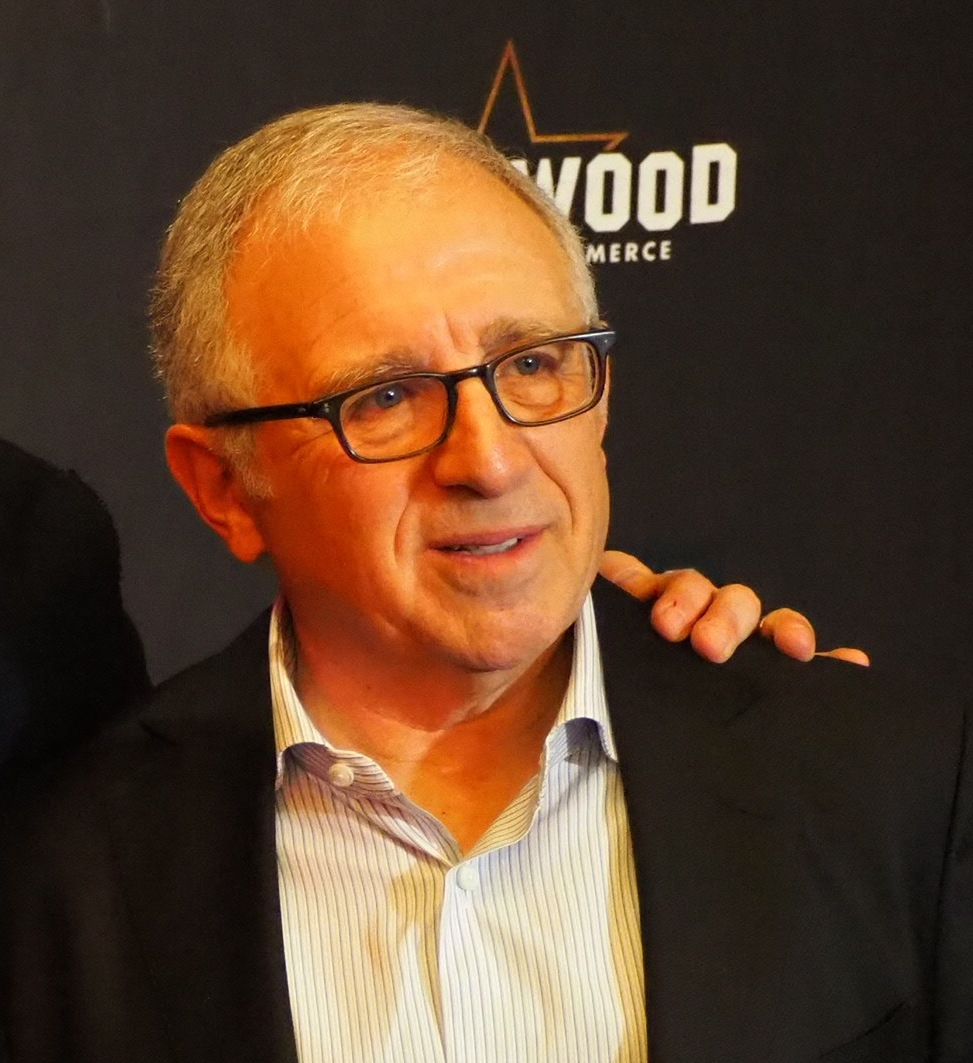
- Azoff in 2018
- Born: December 12, 1947 (age 78); Danville, Illinois, U.S.
- Occupations: Record executive; media proprietor
- Years active: 1971–present
- Labels: Full Moon; Giant
- Title: Chairman and CEO of Azoff MSG Entertainment
- Board member of: Starz Inc. IMG
- Spouse: Rochelle "Shelli" Cumsky (m. 1978)
- Children: 4

Signature
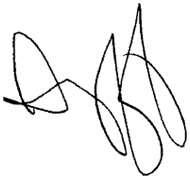

Irving Azoff (/ˈeɪzɒf/; born December 12, 1947) is an American record executive and talent manager. He is the chairman of Full Stop Management, a company that represents recording artists. During the course of his career, he has also been a talent agent, personal manager, concert promoter, film producer, and music publisher.

Since September 2013, he has been chairman and CEO of Azoff MSG Entertainment, a venture with the Madison Square Garden Company, prior to which he was chairman and CEO of Ticketmaster Entertainment and was executive chairman of Live Nation Entertainment and CEO of Front Line Management. He is on the boards of Starz Inc. and IMG.

Labels founded by Azoff include Full Moon Records, Giant Records and Giant Music.

== Early life ==
Azoff was born into a Jewish family, and raised in Danville, Illinois. He began working with bands while still a student at Danville High School and then in college at the University of Illinois at Urbana–Champaign.

== Career ==
His first management client was Champaign-based REO Speedwagon; his second was Dan Fogelberg. In 1972, Azoff moved to Los Angeles with Fogelberg, where he worked for Geffen-Roberts Management. There he began working with the Eagles, forming a relationship that has lasted more than forty years.

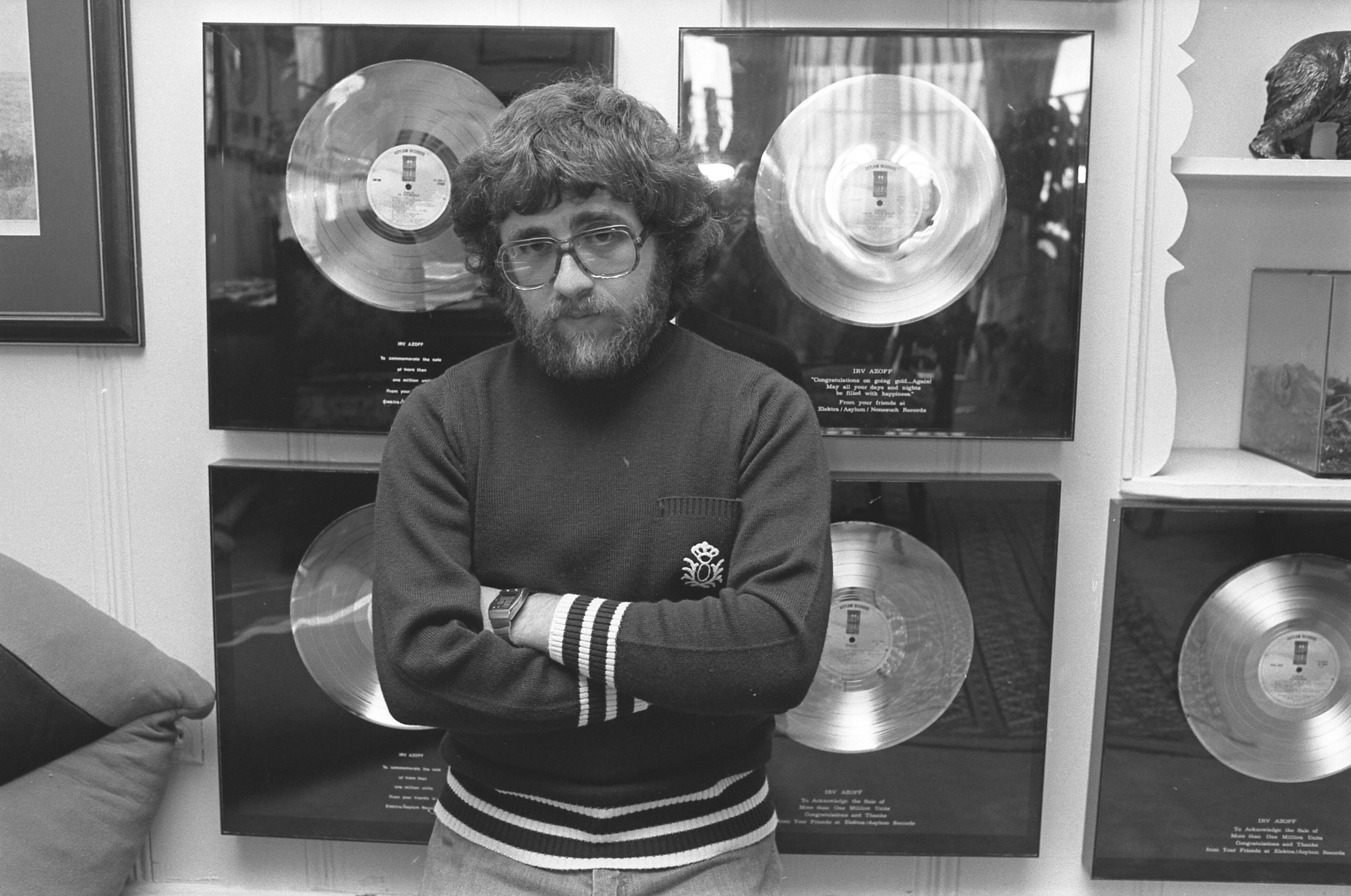
Azoff in 1976

From 1983 to 1989, Azoff was chairman of MCA Music Entertainment Group and is credited for turning around that label's fortunes. Some of the milestones under his watch were the acquisitions of Chess Records and Motown.

According to Thomas R. King's book The Operator (2001), David Geffen orchestrated a strategy that prompted Azoff into leaving MCA and going to Warner Music Group, where Azoff started Giant Records. King writes that Geffen wanted Azoff out at MCA to clear the way for MCA to buy Geffen Records. Geffen convinced Mo Ostin at Warner Music to offer Irving Azoff a "dream" label deal. Giant Records operated for much of the 1990s until Azoff decided to return to concentrating on artist management.

In October 2008, Ticketmaster announced it would acquire the management company Front Line Management Group, Inc. As part of the deal, Azoff, who was founder and chief executive officer of Front Line, became chief executive officer of Ticketmaster, and was named chairman of Live Nation in February 2011.

In 2012, he topped Billboard's Power 100.

In 2013, Azoff founded the performance rights organisation Global Music Rights. The company administered publishing for artists including Metallica, Bruce Springsteen, John Lennon and George Harrison, Pearl Jam, and Bruno Mars. Later that year, Azoff unveiled Azoff MSG Entertainment, a venture with the Madison Square Garden Company (MSG). In addition to his role as chairman and CEO of Azoff MSG Entertainment, Azoff would be a consultant to MSG in connection with the management of its live event venues, including the Forum in Inglewood, CA and other MSG-managed buildings.

In 2015, Azoff played a character based on himself in the Documentary Now! parody of History of the Eagles. The same year, Azoff co-founded Oak View Group with Tim Leiweke. The company is building the Belmont Park Arena as well as a new arena in Milan, Italy. Oak View Group is also part owner of problem hit Co-op Live arena in Manchester, together with City Football Group and musician Harry Styles.

Azoff and Oliver Chastan co-founded Iconic Artists Group in 2018, an entertainment rights management company. In 2021, Iconic Artists Group acquired the catalogue of David Crosby and a majority stake in the Beach Boys' intellectual property. In February 2024, the company acquired the catalogue of British singer Rod Stewart for close to $100 million.

In 2019, Azoff and his wife Shelli, along with a consortium of Los Angeles-based investors, purchased The Apple Pan, one of Los Angeles' oldest continuing operating restaurants, as well as Nate n' Al, founded in 1945. The following January, Azoff was inducted into the Rock and Roll Hall of Fame as an Ahmet Ertegun Award winner.

Azoff has co-produced the movies Fast Times at Ridgemont High, Urban Cowboy, Jack Frost, Above The Rim, and The Inkwell, and was executive producer of The Hurricane. He has been named "Manager of the Year" by two touring industry trade publications. In 2012, Azoff appeared in Artifact, a documentary film about the modern music business focused on the legal battle between Thirty Seconds to Mars and record label EMI.

In 2025, Azoff assembled 27 artists in order to run a so-called 'FireAid' concert for the victims of the January 2025 Southern California wildfires. In an interview with TheWrap about the concert, Azoff claimed that he hadn't slept for two weeks preparing for the event; he also said that its audience would "understand how bad this has been and have compassion for the people and start the healing process". Since the concert, there has been multiple inquiries to how the FireAid concert funds were distributed, with multiple sources reporting that none of the funds had reached victims of the fires and were instead distributed to different local charities.

== Controversy ==
=== Housekeeper lawsuit ===
In 2023, a former housekeeper named Rosa Martinez sued Irving and his wife for back wages and wrongful termination. They were also accused of various abuses including burning the housekeeper with cigarettes, making her clean dirty sex toys and for firing her because she needed a hysterectomy.

=== Monopolization claims ===
In 2018, the Radio Music License Committee made anti-trust claims against Azoff's Global Music Rights, LLC, a performance rights organization. A settlement was reached in 2022.

=== Clippers arena proposal ===
Azoff MSG Entertainment took part in a lawsuit against the city of Inglewood to stop the construction of a new arena for the Los Angeles Clippers in Inglewood alongside residents of the local neighbourhood. During the summer of 2019, it was reported that Azoff was working with James L. Dolan of the Madison Square Garden Company to prevent the competing arena from being built similar to the tactics used to stop the construction of the proposed West Side Stadium in New York City in 2005. In March 2019, leaked emails revealed that Azoff attempted to lure the Los Angeles Lakers back to The Forum after their lease at the Staples Center was up.

=== Nicki Minaj ===
In 2018, Nicki Minaj accused Azoff of orchestrating a smear campaign against her upcoming tour; however, he later became her manager. Additionally, his performance rights organization Global Music Rights manages most of her song writing credits.

=== The Black Keys ===
In 2024, American rock duo the Black Keys canceled their tour and fired Azoff as their manager after they had to cancel their US tour due to low ticket sales. In response to the claim by a representative of Azoff that the split was an "amicable parting", drummer Patrick Carney said, "I mean, we fired their ass. Shit happens."

== Personal life ==
In 1978, he married Rochelle "Shelli" Cumsky. They have four children, and the eldest son, Jeffrey Azoff, is a partner in Full Stop Management.
