= Longer =

- Original U.S. single

Single by Dan Fogelberg

from the album Phoenix
- B-side: "Along the Road"
- Released: December 8, 1979
- Recorded: October 1979
- Genre: Soft rock; folk rock
- Length: 3:15
- Label: Epic
- Songwriter: Dan Fogelberg
- Producers: Dan Fogelberg; Norbert Putnam; Marty Lewis

Dan Fogelberg singles chronology
"The Power of Gold" (1978)	"Longer" (1979)	"Heart Hotels" (1980)

"Longer" is a song written and recorded by the American singer-songwriter Dan Fogelberg and released in 1979 by Full Moon Records and Epic Records. The song can be found on Fogelberg's 1979 album Phoenix. It was also included on his 1982 greatest hits album as well as various other retrospective and compilation recordings.

Fogelberg, who had released more rock oriented songs throughout the 1970s, jokingly described "Longer" in the liner notes to one of his retrospective albums as "the song that put me on the elevators." He wrote the song while vacationing in Maui, "lounging in a hammock one night and looking up at the stars. It just seems this song was drifting around the universe, saw me, and decided I'd give it a good home." Accompanying Fogelberg's vocals is an acoustic guitar (played by the singer) as well as a flugelhorn solo by Jerry Hey.

Lyrically, the song compares various events ("Longer than there've been stars up in the heavens") with his emotional attachment to the one he loves ("I've been in love with you").

== Personnel ==
- Dan Fogelberg – lead vocals, acoustic guitar
- Jerry Hey – flugelhorn
- Gayle Levant – harp

== Chart performance ==
"Longer" was released as a single in December 1979, prior to the release of the album Phoenix. It became Fogelberg's highest-charting hit song of his career, spending two weeks at No. 2 on the Billboard Hot 100 chart in March 1980. It was kept from the summit the first week by "Crazy Little Thing Called Love" by Queen, and remained in the runner-up spot the next week behind "Another Brick in the Wall" by Pink Floyd. In addition, "Longer" became the first of the singer's four No. 1 songs on the Billboard Adult Contemporary chart between 1980 and 1984. The song reached No. 85 on the Billboard Country chart.

In the United Kingdom, "Longer" was Fogelberg's only song to reach the UK Singles Chart, where it peaked at No. 59.

== Charts ==
=== Weekly charts ===
Chart (1979–1980)	Peak position
Canada Top Singles (RPM)	19
Canada Adult Contemporary (RPM)	6
Canada Country Singles (RPM)	64
UK Singles (Official Charts)	59
US Billboard Hot 100	2
US Adult Contemporary (Billboard)	1
US Hot Country Songs (Billboard)	85
US Cash Box Top 100	1

=== Year-end charts ===
Chart (1980)	Rank
US Billboard Hot 100	33
US Cash Box Top 100	21

== In popular culture ==
- The song appears on Nissan Gloria Y30 and Y31 commercial advertisements. The song also appears in a Toyota Tercel 2001 commercial in Taiwan.
- The song appears in the wedding scene in the film About Schmidt, with lead vocals performed by Beth Heimann.

== See also ==
- List of number-one adult contemporary singles of 1980 (U.S.)
- List of Cash Box Top 100 number-one singles of 1980
