= Tim Weisberg =

American jazz/rock fusion artist (born 1943)

- Born: Jules Timothy Weisberg; January 1, 1943 (age 83); Hollywood, California, U.S.
- Genres: Jazz, fusion, pop
- Occupation: Musician
- Instrument: Flute
- Years active: 1970–present
- Label: A&M
- Website: timweisberg.com

Jules Timothy Weisberg (born January 1, 1943) is an American flutist, vocalist, and record producer. A collaboration album with singer-songwriter Dan Fogelberg, "Twin Sons of Different Mothers," achieved platinum status from the Recording Industry Association of America (RIAA).

== Career ==
In school, Weisberg wanted to play drums, but instruments were chosen in order of the students' last names. When Weisberg got his chance, his choice was bassoon or flute. He chose the latter because it was easier to carry and seemed easier to learn. He was a fan of soul music, which had been using the flute in the 1960s. He studied classical music before playing soul, jazz and pop. His first experience recording was on The Monkees' album The Monkees Present in 1969.

While working as a studio musician, his debut album was released with a version of "Nights in White Satin" by The Moody Blues. In 1972 he recorded with The Carpenters and two years later appeared on the television programs The Midnight Special and Don Kirshner's Rock Concert. His song "A Hard Way to Go" appeared in Woody Allen's movie Annie Hall. He had a hit song, "The Power of Gold", on Twin Sons of Different Mothers (1978), an album recorded with Dan Fogelberg. They collaborated again in 1995 on No Resemblance Whatsoever. Weisberg sued Fogelberg in 1997 for alleged breach of contract and fraud.

Weisberg has performed with David Benoit, Dave Mason, David Arkenstone, and Eddie Rabbitt.

== Other appearances ==
- He appeared on the TV show, The Midnight Special, hosted by Bobby Womack (season 2, episode 42), on July 12, 1974.
- He appeared in an ABC TV interview with Dan Fogelberg, in which they discuss their collaboration for the No Resemblance Whatsoever album.

== Performances ==
- Winter Park Jazz Festival, Winter Park, Colorado, July 19, 1998.
- Bonnie Raitt - Tim Weisberg concert at Greek Theatre, University of California, Berkeley, September 14, 1980.
- Tom Waits opened for a concert by Tim Weisberg at Ebbett's Field, Denver Colorado, May 17–19, 1973
- Monterey Jazz Festival, Monterey, California, 1970

== Awards and honors ==
- Twin Sons of Different Mothers was Certified Platinum by RIAA.

== Discography ==
- Tim Weisberg (A&M, 1971)
- Hurtwood Edge (A&M, 1972)
- Dreamspeaker (A&M, 1973)
- 4 (A&M, 1974)
- Listen to the City (A&M, 1975)
- Live at Last! (A&M, 1976)
- The Tim Weisberg Band (United Artists, 1977)
- Rotations (United Artists, 1978)
- Twin Sons of Different Mothers with Dan Fogelberg (Full Moon/Epic, 1978)
- The Best of Tim Weisberg: Smile! (A&M 1979)
- The Tip of the Weisberg (Nautilus, 1979)
- Night-Rider! (MCA, 1979)
- Party of One (MCA, 1980)
- Travelin' Light (MCA, 1981)
- High Risk (Cypress, 1985)
- Outrageous Temptations (Cypress, 1989)
- Naked Eyes (Fahrenheit, 1994)
- No Resemblance Whatsoever with Dan Fogelberg (Giant, 1995)
- Undercover (Fahrenheit, 1997)
- Time Traveler: A Three Decade Journey (Fahrenheit, 1999)
- Another Byte (DreamSpeaker Music, 2015)

=== As guest ===
With David Benoit

- Digits (AVI 1983)
- Lost and Found (Rhino, 1994)
- Fuzzy Logic (GRP, 2002)
- Full Circle (Peak, 2006)
- Earthglow (Heads Up, 2010)
- Conversation (Heads Up, 2012)
- 2 in Love (Concord, 2015)

With others

- The Monkees, The Monkees Present (Colgems, 1969)
- The Carpenters, A Song for You (A&M, 1972)
- Dan Fogelberg, Nether Lands (Epic, 1977)
- Dan Fogelberg, Live: Greetings from the West (Epic, 1991)
- Lani Hall, Sun Down Lady (A&M, 1972)
- Paul Horn, Paul Horn & the Concert Ensemble (Ovation, 1970)
- Inner Circle, Ready for the World (Capitol, 1977)
- Dave Mason, Dave Mason (CBS, 1974)
- Pousette-Dart Band, Never Enough (Capitol, 1979)
- Terry Reid, Seed of Memory (ABC, 1976)
- David Riordan, Medicine Wheel (Capitol, 1974)
- Daniel Valdez, Mestizo (A&M, 1974)

=== Singles ===
- 1971 - Long Ago and Far Away/A Hard Way To Go (A&M 1318)
- 1972 - Fog and Spice/For Those Who Never Dream (A&M 1330)
- 1972 - Our Thing/Thyme Cube (A&M 1397)
- 1973 - Killing Me Softly with His Song/Tibetan Silver (A&M 1427)
- 1973 - Do Dah/A Night for Crying (A&M 1493)
- 1974 - Streak Out/Night for Crying (A&M 1520)
- 1975 - Dion Blue/The Visit (A&M 1680)
- 1976 - Gonna Fly Now (Theme from Rocky)/Just for Fun (UA XW933)
- 1977 - Cascade/Gene Jean (UA XW1083)
- 1978 - Every Time I See Your Smile/So Good to Me (UA 1227)
- 1978 - (w/Dan Fogelberg) Tell Me to My Face/Hurtwood Alley (Full Moon 50605) also released by: UK/Full Moon, Australia & Netherlands/Epic
- 1979 - (w/Dan Fogelberg) The Power of Gold/Lahaina Luna (Full Moon 50606) also released by: UK/Full Moon, Canada & Japan/Epic
- 1979 - Midsummer's Dream/Moonchild (MCA 40135)
- 1980 - Magic Lady/I'm The Lucky One (MCA 41307)
- 1981 - What's Going On/Page One (MCA 51042)
- 1981 - Sleepwalk/Paula (MCA 51163)
- 1985 - You've Got to Know/Hang Time (Desert Rock 001)
