= Hard to Say =

- Side A of the US single

Single by Dan Fogelberg

from the album The Innocent Age
- B-side: "The Innocent Age"
- Released: August 1981
- Genre: Pop
- Length: 4:00
- Label: Full Moon
- Songwriter: Dan Fogelberg

Dan Fogelberg singles chronology
"Same Old Lang Syne" (1980)	"Hard to Say" (1981)	"Leader of the Band" (1981)

"Hard to Say" is a song written and performed by the American singer-songwriter Dan Fogelberg. Released as a single in 1981, it appeared on Fogelberg's album The Innocent Age.

Fogelberg wrote the song while recovering from surgery. The song features backing vocals by singer Glenn Frey of the Eagles. The song became Fogelberg's third Top 10 hit on the Billboard Hot 100 chart when it peaked at No. 7 in October 1981. It also spent three weeks at No. 2 on the Billboard adult contemporary chart. It became his greatest hit in Canada, where it peaked at No. 16 Pop and No. 1 AC.

== Chart performance ==
=== Weekly charts ===
Chart (1981)	Peak position
Canada RPM Top Singles	16
Canada RPM Adult Contemporary	1
U.S. Billboard Hot 100	7
U.S. Billboard Adult Contemporary	2
U.S. Billboard Top Rock Tracks	14
U.S. Cash Box Top 100	7

=== Year-end charts ===
Chart (1981)	Rank
Canada	82
U.S. Cash Box	73
