= Heart Hotels =

Single by Dan Fogelberg

from the album Phoenix
- B-side: "Beggar's Game"
- Released: March 1980
- Recorded: October 1979
- Genre: Soft rock
- Length: 4:15 (album version); 3:20 (7" version)
- Label: Epic
- Songwriter(s): Dan Fogelberg
- Producer(s): Dan Fogelberg, Norbert Putnam, Marty Lewis

Dan Fogelberg singles chronology
"Longer" (1979)	"Heart Hotels" (1980)	"Same Old Lang Syne" (1980)

"Heart Hotels" is a song written and recorded by the American singer-songwriter Dan Fogelberg. The song appears on Fogelberg's 1979 album Phoenix. It was the second of two single releases from the LP.

== Background ==
"Heart Hotels" is a metaphor for protracted loneliness, bordering on despair. The song features a Lyricon solo by acclaimed session musician Tom Scott.

== Personnel ==
- Dan Fogelberg – lead and backing vocals, acoustic and electric guitars, Prophet 5, electric and acoustic pianos, orchestral arrangements
- Russ Kunkel – congas
- Jody Linscott – conductor
- Andy Newmark – drums
- Norbert Putnam – bass guitar
- Tom Scott – saxophone, lyricon
- Sid Sharp – concertmaster
- Glen Spreen – orchestral arrangements

== Weekly charts ==
In the spring of 1980, the song peaked at #21 in the U.S. and #3 on Billboard magazine's Adult Contemporary chart. It was a lesser hit in Canada.

Chart (1980)	Peak position
U.S. Billboard Hot 100	21
U.S. Billboard Adult Contemporary	3
Canada RPM 100	81
