= Run for the Roses (song) =

Single by Dan Fogelberg

from the album The Innocent Age
- B-side: "The Sand and the Foam"
- Released: 1982
- Genre: Soft rock
- Length: 4:20
- Label: Full Moon
- Songwriter: Dan Fogelberg
- Producers: Dan Fogelberg, Marty Lewis

Dan Fogelberg singles chronology
"Leader of the Band" (1981)	"Run for the Roses" (1982)	"Missing You" (1982)

"Run for the Roses" is a song written and recorded by singer/songwriter Dan Fogelberg in 1980.

== Background ==
The chorus mentions "the chance of a lifetime in a lifetime of chance", at once describing the experience of horse racing and life itself. The song has since been used as an unofficial theme for the Kentucky Derby.

== Chart performance ==
Released as a single from the album The Innocent Age the following year, it peaked at number 18 on the Billboard Hot 100.

Chart (1981–1982)	Peak position
U.S. Billboard Hot 100	18
U.S. Billboard Hot Adult Contemporary Tracks	3
Canadian RPM Top Singles	33
Canadian RPM Adult Contemporary Tracks	1
Canadian RPM Country Tracks	16

== Popular culture ==
The song was commissioned by ABC for its telecast of the 106th running of the Derby in 1980, and premiered on the network's Derby preview special the night before. Fogelberg stated that it was written in two days. The performance was broadcast from the Red Barn, the student activities building at the University of Louisville.
