= Same Old Lang Syne =

- Picture sleeve for the U.S. vinyl release

Single by Dan Fogelberg

from the album The Innocent Age
- B-side: "Hearts and Crafts"
- Released: November 1980
- Recorded: 1980
- Genre: Soft rock; christmas
- Length: 5:18
- Label: Full Moon
- Songwriter: Dan Fogelberg
- Producers: Dan Fogelberg, Marty Lewis

Dan Fogelberg singles chronology
"Heart Hotels" (1980)	"Same Old Lang Syne" (1980)	"Hard to Say" (1981)

"Same Old Lang Syne" is a song written and recorded by Dan Fogelberg and released as a single in 1980. It was included on his 1981 album The Innocent Age. The song is an autobiographical narrative ballad told in the first person and tells the story of two long-ago romantic interests meeting by chance in a grocery store on Christmas Eve. The song peaked at No. 9 on the Billboard Hot 100 and is now frequently played during the holiday season and alongside traditional Christmas songs.

== Content ==
On a snowy Christmas Eve, the narrator is reunited with an old flame at a grocery store. She does not recognize him at first, but when she does, they decide to talk over a drink. However, there are no bars open, so they bring a six-pack of beer from a liquor store to her car.

The pair push through their initial awkwardness to discuss their lives. The lover married an architect, for security instead of love. The narrator, a musician, loves performing for audiences, but hates traveling.

After consuming all of the beer, they exchange their goodbyes; the woman kisses him as he gets out of the car, and drives away. He flashes back to school and relives the pain of their breakup; as he walks home, the falling snow turns into rain.

The melody is based on the 1812 Overture by Tchaikovsky and ends with "Auld Lang Syne" as a soprano saxophone solo by Michael Brecker.

== Origins ==
As Fogelberg said on his official website, the song was autobiographical. He was visiting his parents for Christmas at the family home in Peoria, Illinois, in 1975 when he ran into an old girlfriend from Woodruff High School, the former Jill Anderson at the "Convenient Food Mart" (now a convenience store) on Abington Street Hill. Fogelberg stated in interviews that he did not recall precisely whether the chance meeting with his ex-girlfriend was in 1975 or 1976, though he leaned toward 1975; this was later confirmed.

In 2006, Fogelberg received a letter from a young fan named Grace Ferguson who asked him about the meaning of the song's final lyric, "And as I turned to make my way back home / The snow turned into rain". The lyric has often been interpreted metaphorically as the world feeling warmer after he had talked with his ex-girlfriend. In reply, Fogelberg acknowledged this metaphor as "wonderful", although, as he wrote, "as I drove home, the snow actually DID turn from snow into rain!".

After Fogelberg's death from prostate cancer in 2007, the woman in the song, Jill Anderson Greulich, came forward with her story. Greulich told of how she and Fogelberg dated in high school. As she explained to the Peoria Journal Star in an article dated December 22, 2007, the pair knew each other in Peoria, Illinois as part of the Woodruff High School class of 1969. After graduation, each attended different colleges. Following college, Greulich married and moved to Chicago, while Fogelberg moved to Colorado to pursue a music career. While back in Peoria visiting their families for Christmas in 1975, Fogelberg and Greulich ran into each other on Christmas Eve at a convenience store located at 1302 East Frye Avenue in the Abington Hill district. Greulich confirmed that they bought a six-pack of beer and drank it in her car for two hours while they talked. Five years later, after the song was released, Greulich heard it on the radio for the first time while driving to work but kept quiet, as Fogelberg had not disclosed her identity. She stated that her reason for remaining quiet about her involvement in the song's narrative was that coming forward might have disrupted Fogelberg's marriage.

Greulich noted that Fogelberg had taken artistic license with two details of the story: her eyes are green, not blue, and her husband was a physical education teacher, not an architect. In regard to the line, "She would have liked to say she loved the man, but she didn't like to lie," Greulich will not talk about it, but by the time of the song's release in 1980, she and her husband had divorced.

In 2008, the City of Peoria gave Abington Street Hill the honorary designation of "Fogelberg Parkway".

== Association with Christmas ==
"Same Old Lang Syne" is frequently played on radio stations during the North American holiday season. The song's opening lyrics reveal that the narrative takes place on a snowy Christmas Eve and they end with a second acknowledgment of snow. Since the song's release, these references and the musical quote of "Auld Lang Syne", a song traditionally sung on New Year's Eve, have increased the song's popularity during the month of December. The song debuted on the Hot 100's top 40, at #37, on 27 December 1980, between Christmas and New Year's Eve, and peaked at #9 on that list.

== Cover versions ==
The boy band Backstreet Boys covered the song on their album A Very Backstreet Christmas, released on October 14, 2022. Their version omits the final verse and instead ends with the chorus to "Auld Lang Syne".

The band Train covered the song on the compilation A Tribute to Dan Fogelberg.

Musician Jonathan Coulton covered the song on his 2019 album Some Guys.

== Musicians ==
- Dan Fogelberg: Piano, bass, electric piano, lead and background vocals
- Glen Spreen: orchestral arrangements
- Russ Kunkel: Drums
- Michael Brecker: Soprano saxophone

== Chart performance ==
=== Weekly charts ===
Chart (1980–1981)	Peak position
Ireland (IRMA)	25
New Zealand	23
U.S. Billboard Hot 100	9
U.S. Billboard Adult Contemporary	8
U.S. Cash Box Top 100	7

=== Year-end charts ===
Chart (1981)	Rank
U.S. Billboard Hot 100	79
U.S. Cash Box	60
