= Leader of the Band =

Single by Dan Fogelberg

from the album The Innocent Age
- B-side: "Times Like These"
- Released: December 1981
- Genre: Folk rock; soft rock
- Length: 4:15 (single version); 4:48 (album version)
- Label: Full Moon/Epic
- Songwriter: Dan Fogelberg
- Producers: Dan Fogelberg, Marty Lewis

Dan Fogelberg singles chronology
"Hard to Say" (1981)	"Leader of the Band" (1981)	"Run for the Roses" (1982)

Music video
- Dan Fogelberg - Leader of the Band (from Live: Greetings from the West) on YouTube

"Leader of the Band" is a song written by American singer-songwriter Dan Fogelberg for his 1981 album The Innocent Age. The song was written as a tribute to his father Lawrence Fogelberg, a musician and leader of a band who was still alive when the song was released. Before Lawrence's death in August 1982, he granted many media interviews because of the song.

The single was released in late 1981 and peaked at No. 9 on the Billboard Hot 100 chart in March 1982. It became Fogelberg's second No. 1 song on the Billboard Adult Contemporary chart, following his 1980 hit "Longer". On the Radio & Records charts, "Leader of the Band" peaked at No. 2 on the CHR/Pop chart, and hit No. 1 on the AC chart.

== Charts ==
Chart (1982)	Peak position
US Billboard Hot 100	9
US Adult Contemporary (Billboard)	1

Year-end chart (1982)	Rank
US Top Pop Singles (Billboard)	35

== Other versions ==
- The Mercey Brothers recorded the song in 1984 for their compilation album Latest and Greatest Volume 1. It peaked at #9 on the Canadian country music chart and at #21 on the Canadian adult contemporary chart.
- Lucie Arnaz has performed a version of the song as a tribute to her late father Desi Arnaz. However, she changed the line "A cabinet maker's son" to "A mayor's son" as her grandfather was mayor of Santiago de Cuba from 1928 until 1932.
- Regine Velasquez recorded the song in 2008 for her album Low Key, and she also performed the song for her father Gerardo Velasquez.
- Zac Brown recorded the song in 2017 as part of a tribute album to Dan Fogelberg. He also dedicated it to his father.

== See also ==
- List of number-one adult contemporary singles of 1982 (U.S.)
