= Dan Fogelberg =

American singer-songwriter (1951–2007)

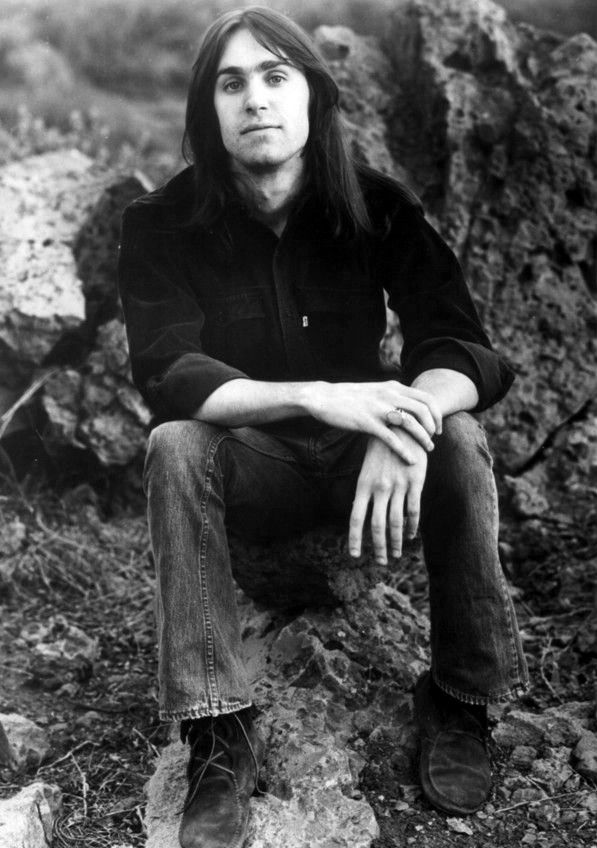
- Fogelberg in 1974

Background information
- Born: Daniel Grayling Fogelberg; August 13, 1951; Peoria, Illinois, U.S.
- Died: December 16, 2007 (aged 56) Deer Isle, Maine, U.S.
- Genres: Rock; country; folk; folk rock; soft rock; pop rock; pop
- Occupations: Singer; musician; songwriter; composer
- Instruments: Vocals; guitar; bass; piano; keyboards
- Years active: 1968–2007
- Labels: Columbia; Full Moon; Epic; Giant; Mailboat
- Website: danfogelberg.com

Daniel Grayling Fogelberg (August 13, 1951 – December 16, 2007) was an American singer, songwriter, and multi-instrumentalist widely known for his 1970s and 1980s soft rock hits, including "Longer" (1979), "Same Old Lang Syne" (1980), "Leader of the Band" (1981) and "Run for the Roses" (1982).

== Early life and family ==
Dan Fogelberg was born in Peoria, Illinois, on August 13, 1951. He was the youngest of three sons born to Margaret (née Irvine, 1920–2015), a classically trained pianist, and Lawrence Peter Fogelberg (1911–1982), a band director at Woodruff High School in Peoria, at Pekin Community High School in Pekin, Illinois, and at Bradley University in Peoria. Fogelberg's mother was a Scottish immigrant and his father was of Swedish descent.

Fogelberg often related his story of his father having allowed him to "conduct" the Bradley University school band at age 14. In 1981, Fogelberg released the song "Leader of the Band", which was written for and inspired by his father.

Using a Mel Bay course book, Fogelberg taught himself to play a Hawaiian slide guitar that his grandfather had given him. He also learned to play the piano. At age 14, he joined a band, the Clan, which covered the Beatles. His second band was another cover band, the Coachmen, who released a single in 1967 with both tracks written by Fogelberg, recorded at Golden Voice Recording studio in South Pekin, Illinois, and released on the Ledger Record label: "Maybe Time Will Let Me Forget" and "Don't Want to Lose Her".

After graduating from Woodruff High School in 1969, Fogelberg studied theater arts and painting at the University of Illinois at Urbana-Champaign. He began performing as a solo acoustic player at a coffeehouse, "The Red Herring", where he made his first solo recordings as part of a folk festival in 1971. He was discovered by Irving Azoff, who started his music management career promoting another Champaign-Urbana act, REO Speedwagon. Azoff sent Fogelberg to Nashville, Tennessee, to hone his skills. There he became a session musician and recorded his first album with producer Norbert Putnam. In 1972, Fogelberg released his debut album Home Free to a lukewarm response, although it eventually reached platinum status.

He performed as an opening act for Van Morrison in the early 1970s.

== Career ==
WZZQ, a radio station in Jackson, Mississippi, gave Home Free a lot of airplay and some local promoters secured the City Auditorium in Jackson for a concert. They sold out the show in ten days and when they called Fogelberg's agent to let him know the show had sold out, he was in disbelief because Fogelberg had been playing in clubs with fewer than 100 people in attendance, whereas the City Auditorium had 2,500 seats. On February 22, 1974, this show was broadcast and recorded by WZZQ.

Fogelberg's second effort was successful – the 1974 Joe Walsh-produced album Souvenirs. The song "Part of the Plan" became his first hit. Fogelberg also received contributions from the Eagles throughout the album. He had toured with the Eagles during this time. After Souvenirs, he released a string of gold and platinum albums, including Captured Angel (1975) and Nether Lands (1977).

His 1978 Twin Sons of Different Mothers was the first of two collaborations with jazz flutist Tim Weisberg, which found commercial success with songs such as "The Power of Gold".

Phoenix, from 1979, reached the top 10, with "Longer" becoming a #2 pop hit in 1980 and peaking at number 59 on the UK Singles Chart – his sole entry on that chart. This LP eventually sold two million copies. It was followed by a Top 20 hit "Heart Hotels". The album also reached number 42 on the UK Albums Chart, likewise his only entry on that chart.

In 1980, Fogelberg appeared on the soundtrack to the film Urban Cowboy with his song "Times Like These". He performed live on television for the first time.

The Innocent Age, released in October 1981, was Fogelberg's critical and commercial peak. The double album included four of his biggest hits: "Same Old Lang Syne", "Hard to Say", "Leader of the Band", and "Run for the Roses". He drew inspiration for The Innocent Age from Thomas Wolfe's novel Of Time and the River. A 1982 greatest hits album contained two new songs, both of which were released as singles: "Missing You" and "Make Love Stay". In 1984, he released the album Windows and Walls, containing the singles "The Language of Love" and "Believe in Me".

Fogelberg released High Country Snows in 1985. Recorded in Nashville, it showcased his and some of the industry's best talent in bluegrass. Vince Gill, Ricky Skaggs, Doc Watson, Jerry Douglas, David Grisman, Chris Hillman, and Herb Pedersen contributed to the record. In a world he defined as "life in the fast lane", Fogelberg described the music as "life in the off-ramp". In late 1985, he switched gears and took to the road with a group of musician friends, including Joe Vitale, Paul Harris, Tino Gonzales, Jeff Grossberg and Rick Rosas, playing blues in small clubs throughout Colorado as Frankie and the Aliens, covering songs by Cream and Muddy Waters, among others. 1987 heralded a return to rock with Exiles, an album that contained "What You're Doing", a throwback to the old Stax Records sound made famous in Memphis during the 1960s. The Wild Places, an album whose theme was the preservation of nature, was released in 1990 followed by a tour. His live Greetings From The West album, and full-length concert film (with interview segments) of the same name, were released in 1991.

River of Souls, released in 1993, was Fogelberg's last studio album for Sony Records. In 1997, the box set Portrait encompassed his career with four discs, each highlighting a different facet of his music. In 1999, he released a Christmas album, The First Christmas Morning, and in 2003, Full Circle showcased a return to the folk-influenced 1970s soft rock style of music.

In May 2017, a live album of Fogelberg's performance at Carnegie Hall, championed by his wife, sourced from a 1979 tape made by his touring sound company, was released. It peaked at No. 71 on the Billboard album chart on June 10, 2017, becoming the first of Fogelberg's live albums to chart on the Billboard Top 200 chart.

== Personal life ==
Fogelberg was married three times: to Maggie Slaymaker from 1982 to 1985, to Anastasia Savage from 1991 to 1996 and to musician Jean Marie Mayer from 2002 until he died in 2007.

From the early 1980s until his cancer diagnosis, Fogelberg lived near Pagosa Springs, Colorado, on a working ranch, which housed a recording studio that he built. He also owned a home in Maine on Deer Isle, overlooking Eggemoggin Reach.

=== Cancer diagnosis and death ===
In May 2004, Fogelberg was diagnosed with advanced prostate cancer. After undergoing therapy, his cancer went into partial remission. In August 2005, Fogelberg announced the success of his cancer treatments. However, his cancer returned and on December 16, 2007, Fogelberg died at his home in Deer Isle, Maine, at the age of 56. Fogelberg was cremated and his ashes were scattered on Eggemoggin Reach (from his song "The Reach") off the coast of Maine.

In 2009, Fogelberg's widow, Jean Fogelberg, produced Love in Time, a collection of 11 previously unpublished songs that Fogelberg had asked her to release after his death. Love in Time became the first Dan Fogelberg album to chart since River of Souls in 1993, reaching number 117 on the Billboard Top 200 on October 10, 2009.

== Legacy ==
In tribute to Dan and his father Lawrence Fogelberg, Peoria renamed Abington Street in the city's East Bluff neighborhood "Fogelberg Parkway". The street runs along the northeast side of Woodruff High School, Fogelberg's alma mater and where his father was a teacher and bandleader. Fogelberg Parkway continues to the intersection of N. Prospect and E. Frye, the location of the convenience store where Fogelberg ran into his high school sweetheart one Christmas Eve – as described in the song "Same Old Lang Syne". A group of Fogelberg fans created a memorial garden in Riverfront Park in 2010.

In 2017, ten years after the singer's death, Jean Fogelberg released Dan Fogelberg - Live at Carnegie Hall which immediately became a fan favorite. That same year, she released a CD tribute to Dan's work, A Tribute to Dan Fogelberg, with performances by his old friend and producer Joe Walsh with Eagles, Garth Brooks, Trisha Yearwood, Vince Gill, Amy Grant, Jimmy Buffett, Michael McDonald, Randy Owen, Donna Summer, Boz Scaggs, Dobie Gray, the Zac Brown Band, and other artists. Seven years in the making, the tribute CD was co-produced by Jean, with major assistance from Dan Fogelberg's friend, producer and arranger Norbert Putnam; Fogelberg's longtime friend and manager, Irving Azoff; and Denver music promoter Chuck Morris. In conjunction with the tribute CD, Fogelberg was inducted into the Colorado Music Hall of Fame at its "Rocky Mountain Way" induction concert at Fiddler's Green Amphitheater on Fogelberg's birthday, August 13, 2017.

Part of the Plan is a musical using the music of Fogelberg. Starring Harley Jay and Kate Morgan Chadwick, it opened on September 8, 2017, at the Tennessee Performing Arts Center (TPAC) in Nashville. Written by Kate Atkinson & Karen Harris of K-Squared Entertainment, the new musical played nineteen performances in TPAC's James K. Polk Theatre in September 2017 and swept the 2017 Broadway World Regional Awards with 15 wins including BEST NEW WORK and BEST MUSICAL.

My Morning Jacket frontman Jim James has cited Fogelberg as a musical favorite and an influence, with "Leader of the Band" being the first single he ever bought. James' home studio features a Trident Series 80 recording console that formerly belonged to Fogelberg. Garth Brooks has stated that Fogelberg influenced his music. "There are songs that people say are the soundtrack of your life... In college, I would take out my Dan Fogelberg records and would read a passage (of lyrics) from Fogelberg's work and go about my day. That was an artist who changed my life, who made me change where I wanted to go and the music I wanted to play and thus, led me here."

== Discography ==
=== Studio albums ===
- Home Free (1972)
- Souvenirs (1974)
- Captured Angel (1975)
- Nether Lands (1977)
- Phoenix (1979)
- The Innocent Age (1981)
- Windows and Walls (1984)
- High Country Snows (1985)
- Exiles (1987)
- The Wild Places (1990)
- River of Souls (1993)
- The First Christmas Morning (1999)
- Full Circle (2003)

=== with Tim Weisberg ===
- Twin Sons of Different Mothers (1978)
- No Resemblance Whatsoever (1995)

=== Posthumous ===
- Love in Time (2009)
