= Norbert Putnam =

American record producer and musician (born 1942)

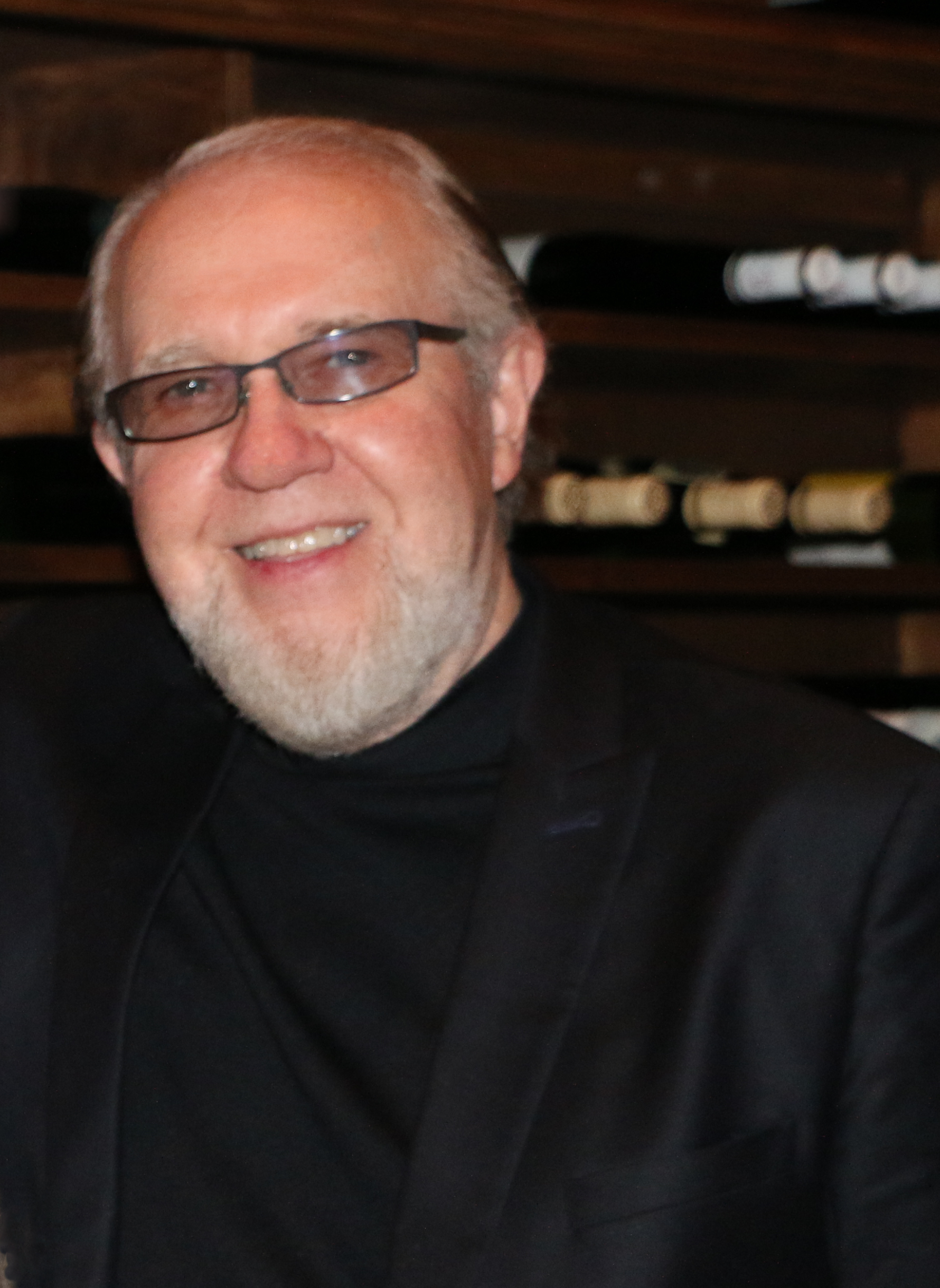
- Putnam in 2014

Background information
- Born: Norbert Auvin Putnam; August 10, 1942 (age 84); Florence, Alabama, United States
- Genres: Rock, pop, country
- Occupations: Record producer, musician
- Formerly of: Elvis Presley, Roy Orbison, Joan Baez, J. J. Cale, Jimmy Buffett

Norbert Auvin Putnam (born August 10, 1942) is an American musician, studio owner and record producer who was inducted into the Musicians Hall of Fame in 2019. He got his start as a bass player in the studio house band in Muscle Shoals, Alabama and from there was recruited to move to Nashville in 1965. He became a successful session player on recordings by artists including Roy Orbison, Al Hirt, Henry Mancini, Dan Fogelberg, Linda Ronstadt, J. J. Cale, Tony Joe White, the Nitty Gritty Dirt Band, the Byrds, Michael Card, Ian & Sylvia and Bobby Goldsboro. Putnam published a memoir in 2017 entitled Music Lessons Vol. 1: a Musical Memoir, in which he chronicled recording sessions with Elvis Presley and other artists.

He became involved with music publishing in his mid-career and in 1971 built Quadraphonic Studios, a popular Nashville recording studio known as simply "Quad" by locals. Quadraphonic's success was in part because of Putnam's interest and experimentation in the technological details of sound recording. He retired from actively playing sessions in the early 1970s to be a producer. In this role, he is credited with broadening Nashville as a recording center by bringing in non-country acts such as Jimmy Buffett, Joan Baez and Dan Fogelberg.

== Early life ==
Putnam's father played in a family band as a young man and when son Norbert was growing up, an upright bass was in the household. In his mid-teens, Putnam played bass in a band in Florence with other teenagers David Briggs and Jerry Carrigan. The boys were too young to drive then and Carrigan's father drove them to engagements. After a couple of years they were hired by Tom Stafford, Rick Hall and Billy Sherrill to make demo recordings for a publishing company. In doing this, they learned how to work as a team to create arrangements for new songs. Putnam and his bandmates later followed Rick Hall to work at FAME Studios in Muscle Shoals and served as the rhythm section for hit records by Arthur Alexander, Tommy Roe and The Tams. The success of these recordings drew the attention of the entire recording industry to the previously unknown and out-of-the way studio. Putnam, Carrigan and Briggs were subsequently recruited by prominent music producers to move to Nashville, about 125 miles north. The three musicians left Muscle Shoals simultaneously to pursue separate careers in Nashville . Their replacements in Muscle Shoals became the second generation of the "Muscle Shoals Rhythm Section" nicknamed "The Swampers".

== Career ==
Putnam's career unfolded in three phases. First, he spent twenty years working recording sessions. Next he became an entrepreneur building music publishing companies and recording studios; the third was producing records by other artists. As a producer, Putnam was responsible for work on Nashville's non-country music output from the late 1960s to the early 1980s. His credits include works that established the popularity of performers such as Jimmy Buffett, Buffy Sainte-Marie, Joan Baez, Dan Fogelberg, Michael Card, Brewer & Shipley, Pousette Dart Band, Donovan, John Hiatt, J.J. Cale, the Flying Burrito Brothers, John Stewart and the New Riders of the Purple Sage. He partnered with David Briggs in 1969 to build a new studio called Quadrafonic in Nashville's Music Row area. Putnam made technical innovations and newer equipment to improve recording quality and is credited with creating a wave of modernization of many Nashville studios. He laid the groundwork for Nashville's widening appeal in attracting pop/rock artists. Putnam was inducted into the Musicians Hall of Fame and Museum in 2019. His book, Music Lessons Vol. 1: a Musical Memoir, was published in early 2017.

== Personal life ==
After a long career in Nashville, Putnam moved to Florence, Alabama, near his birthplace. In 2015, Putnam and his wife Sheryl purchased a nineteenth-century mansion there known as "Thimbleton" which they sold in 2019.

On the Elvis recording of "Merry Christmas Baby", Putnam is referenced by Elvis, when he calls "Wake up Putt".
