= Full Moon Records =

American record label

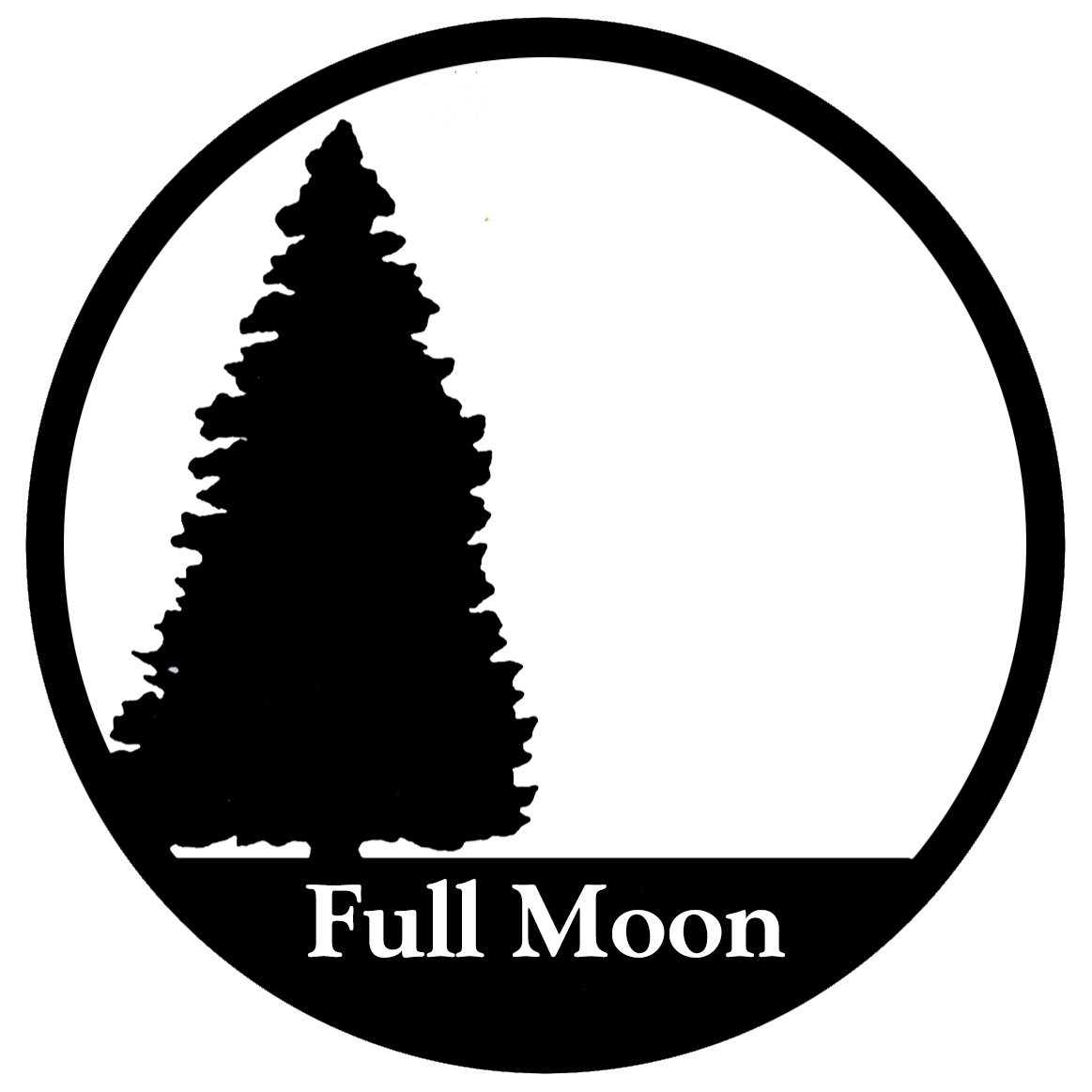
- Parent company: Sony Music Entertainment, Warner Music Group
- Founded: 1974; 52 years ago
- Founder: Irving Azoff
- Status: Defunct
- Distributors: Sony Music Entertainment, Warner Music Group (reissues)
- Genre: Various
- Country of origin: United States
- Location: New York City, New York

Full Moon Records was an American record label existing from 1974 to 1992. Prominent signed acts included Chicago, Peter Cetera, Joe Walsh, and Dan Fogelberg.

Beginning in 1974 with Fogelberg, Full Moon Records was originally a subsidiary "spin-off" label from Epic Records that was created by Irving Azoff. The first album to be released under the label was Fogelberg's second album, Souvenirs. In 1980, distribution moved from CBS to Warner Bros. (movie soundtracks included). Some of the artists affected by the acquisition were Chicago, Grand Funk Railroad, and Johnny Lee. The only exception was Fogelberg, whose Full Moon recordings bore the Full Moon logo and were distributed by Epic throughout. The company was absorbed by Warner Bros. in 1992. The label was briefly revived in 2009 for the release of Fogelberg's final studio album Love in Time, with distribution through Universal Music Enterprises.

== See also ==
- Lists of record labels
