= Joe Walsh discography =

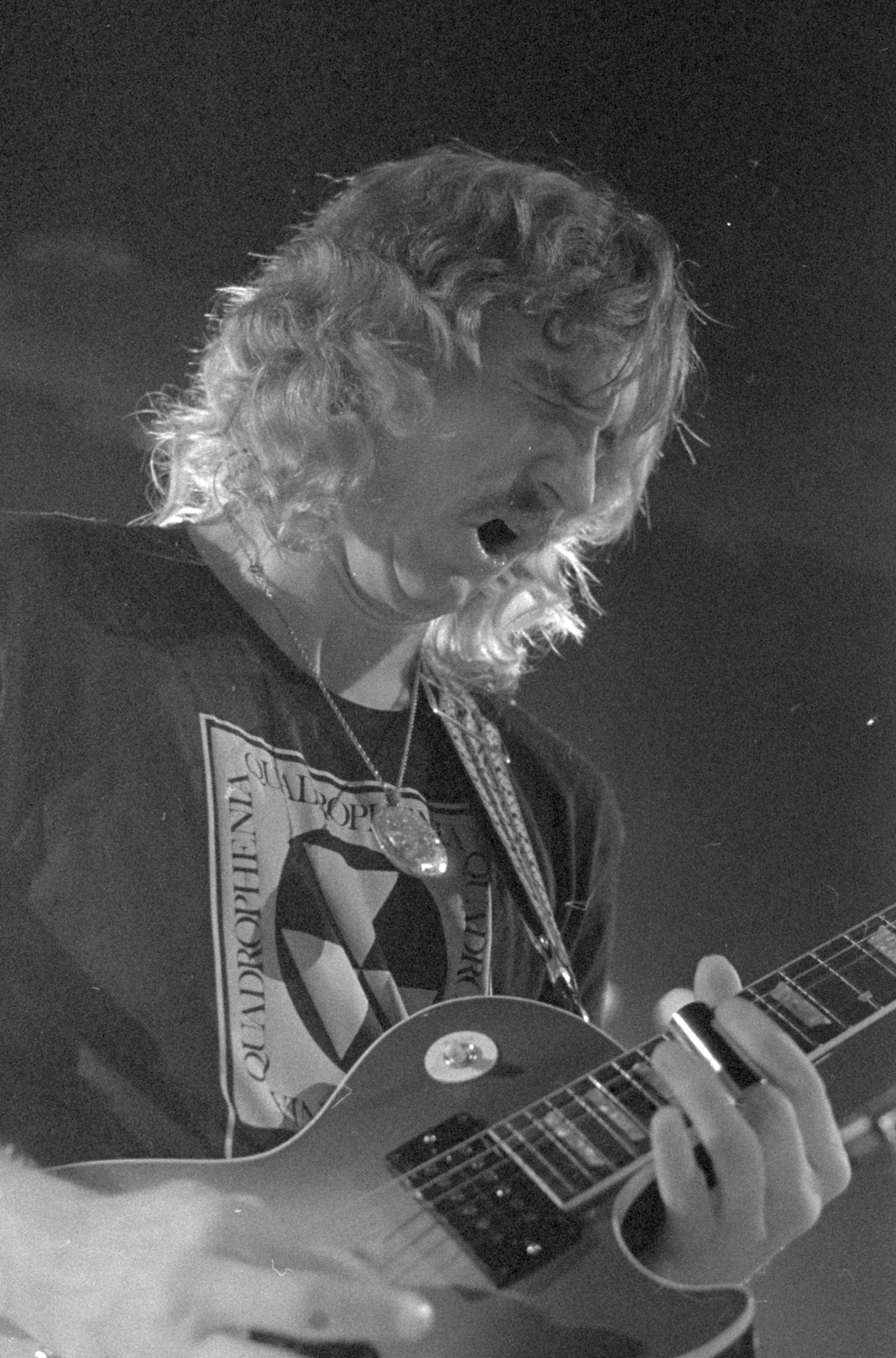
- Walsh during a performance in 2009
- Studio albums: 11
- Live albums: 2
- Compilation albums: 7
- Singles: 21
- Guest album appearances: 50

Joe Walsh is an American rock guitarist, singer, songwriter, and recording artist who has been a member of two successful bands: James Gang and the Eagles, and has recorded and toured with Ringo Starr & His All-Starr Band. His highest charting song is "A Life of Illusion", which reached number-one on the Hot Mainstream Rock Tracks chart.

== Discography ==
=== Studio albums ===
Year	Title	Peak Chart Positions			Certifications
Year	Title	US	AUS	UK	Certifications
1972	Barnstorm	79	—	—	
1973	The Smoker You Drink, the Player You Get	6	—	—	US: Gold
1974	So What	11	55	—	US: Gold
1978	But Seriously, Folks...	8	31	16	US: Platinum
1981	There Goes the Neighborhood	20	61	—	
1983	You Bought It – You Name It	48	—	—	
1985	The Confessor	65	—	—	
1987	Got Any Gum?	113	—	—	
1991	Ordinary Average Guy	112	—	—	
1992	Songs for a Dying Planet	—	—	—	
2012	Analog Man	12	—	53	

=== Live albums ===
Year	Title	Peak Chart Positions		
Year	Title	US	AUS	UK
1976	You Can't Argue with a Sick Mind	20	85	28
2014	All Night Long: Live in Dallas	—	—	—

=== Compilation albums ===
Date	Album	US
November 1978	The Best of Joe Walsh	71
1978	So Far So Good	—
1988	Welcome to the Club	—
May 1995	Look What I Did!	—
1997	Joe Walsh's Greatest Hits – Little Did He Know...	—
June 1997	The Best of Joe Walsh & The James Gang 1969–1974	—
March 2000	20th Century Masters – The Millennium Collection: The Best of Joe Walsh	—

=== Singles ===
1970s

Year	Title	Chart positions				Album
Year	Title	US	AUS	CAN	UK	Album
1973	"Rocky Mountain Way"	23	39	31	—	The Smoker You Drink, The Player You Get
1974	"Meadows"	89	—	—	—	The Smoker You Drink, The Player You Get
1975	"Turn to Stone"	93	—	—	—	So What
1976	"Walk Away"	105	—	—	—	You Can't Argue with a Sick Mind
1977	"Rocky Mountain Way"	—	—	—	39	Rocky Mountain Way EP
1978	"Life's Been Good"	12	56	11	14	But Seriously Folks...
1978	"Over and Over"	106	—	—	—	But Seriously Folks...
1979	"Turn to Stone"	109	—	—	—	The Best of Joe Walsh

1980s–present

Year	Title	Chart positions				Album
Year	Title	US	US Main	CAN	UK	Album
1980	"All Night Long"	19	—	13	—	Urban Cowboy Soundtrack
1981	"A Life of Illusion"	34	1	37	—	There Goes The Neighborhood
1981	"Rivers (Of the Hidden Funk)"	—	35	—	—	There Goes The Neighborhood
1981	"Things"	—	36	—	—	There Goes The Neighborhood
1982	"The Waffle Stomp"	—	20	—	—	Fast Times at Ridgemont High Soundtrack
1983	"Space Age Whiz Kids"	52	21	—	—	You Bought It, You Name It
1983	"I Can Play That Rock & Roll"	—	13	—	—	You Bought It, You Name It
1985	"The Confessor"	—	8	—	—	The Confessor
1987	"The Radio Song"	—	8	—	—	Got Any Gum?
1987	"In My Car"	—	14	—	—	Got Any Gum?
1991	"Ordinary Average Guy"	—	3	34	—	Ordinary Average Guy
1991	"All of a Sudden"	—	13	93	—	Ordinary Average Guy
1992	"Vote for Me"	—	10	—	—	Songs for a Dying Planet

=== With James Gang albums ===
Date	Album	US	Certifications
November 1969	Yer' Album	83	
October 1970	James Gang Rides Again	20	US: Gold
July 1971	Thirds	27	US: Gold
September 1971	James Gang Live in Concert	24	US: Gold
January 1973	The Best of the James Gang Featuring Joe Walsh	79	
November 1973	The James Gang 16 Greatest Hits	181	

=== With the Eagles ===
Date	Album
December 1976	Hotel California
September 1979	The Long Run
November 1980	Eagles Live
November 1994	Hell Freezes Over
October 2007	Long Road Out of Eden
October 2020	Live from the Forum MMXVIII

=== With Ringo Starr and His All-Starr Band ===
Date	Album
October 1990	Ringo Starr and His All-Starr Band
September 1993	Ringo Starr and His All Starr Band Volume 2: Live from Montreux

=== Other album appearances ===
Year	Artist	Album
1967	Ohio Express	Beg, Borrow and Steal LP by: (vocals/guitar on "I Find I Think of You" and "And It's True,")
1970	B. B. King	Indianola Mississippi Seeds: (Guest artist, rhythm guitar)
1973	Manassas	Down the Road: (Slide guitar)
1973	America	Hat Trick: (guitar on "Green Monkey")
1973	Michael Stanley	Michael Stanley: (Slide guitar on "Rosewood Bitters")
1973	Michael Stanley	Friends and Legends: (performed on most songs on album)
1973	Rick Derringer	All American Boy: (performed on "Teenage Queen")
1973	REO Speedwagon	Ridin' the Storm Out: Slide guitar
1974	Billy Preston	The Kids & Me
1974	Dan Fogelberg	Souvenirs: (Walsh performed on and produced this album)
1974	Joe Vitale	Roller Coaster Weekend
1975	Keith Moon	Two Sides of the Moon: (Walsh played electric guitar on four songs.)
1976	Fools Gold	Fools Gold: (Walsh performed on and produced this album with Glenn Frey and Glyn Johns. Walsh played guitar on "Coming Out of Hiding")
1977	Al Kooper	Act Like Nothing's Wrong: (Slide guitar on "Hollywood Vampire")
1977	Andy Gibb	Flowing Rivers
1977	Randy Newman	Little Criminals
1977	Jay Ferguson	Thunder Island
1977	Emerson, Lake & Palmer	Works Volume 1: (guitars and scat vocals on "L.A. Nights" with Keith Emerson on keyboards)
1979	Jay Ferguson	Real Life Ain't This Way
1980	Warren Zevon	Bad Luck Streak in Dancing School
1980	The Beach Boys	Keepin' the Summer Alive: (Walsh played guitar on the title track)
1981	John Entwistle	Too Late the Hero: (Walsh performed on and produced this album)
1981	Joe Vitale	Plantation Harbor
1982	Don Henley	I Can't Stand Still: (Walsh performed the 1st guitar solo on "Dirty Laundry")
1982	Lionel Richie	Lionel Richie: (Electric guitar and guitar solos on "Wandering Stranger")
1983	Ringo Starr	Old Wave: (Walsh both played on and co-produced the album with Russ Ballard)
1984	Timothy B. Schmit	Playin' It Cool: (Slide guitar, electric guitar)
1985	Michael McDonald	No Lookin' Back: (Guest artist, slide guitar)
1986	Steve Winwood	Back in the High Life: (Co-writer and guitar on "Split Decision")
1986	Albert Collins	Jazzvisions: Jump the Blues Away
1987	Richard Marx	Richard Marx: (Slide guitar on "Don't Mean Nothing")
1990	Wilson Phillips	Wilson Phillips: (Solo slide and rhythm guitar on "Impulsive" additional guitar on "Hold On" and "A Reason to Believe")
1990	Herbs	Homegrown: (Walsh played and sang on, wrote for and produced this album; it includes the original versions of "Up All Night", "Ordinary Average Guys" (sung by Herbs bassist Charlie Tumahai) and "It's Alright")
1991	Bob Seger	The Fire Inside: (Guitar, 12 string guitar)
1993	Paul Shaffer	The World's Most Dangerous Party: (Guest artist, vocals)
1995	Various	A Future to This Life: Robocop – The Series Soundtrack: (Three songs, including the title track in a duet with Lita Ford)
1998	Ringo Starr	Vertical Man
1998	Ringo Starr	VH1 Storytellers
1998	Fleetwood Mac	Live in Boston Volume Two: (guitar)
2000	Rick Danko	Times Like These: (Guest artist, guitar, piano, backing vocals)
2006	Frankie Miller	Long Way Home
2007	Kenny Chesney	Just Who I Am: Poets & Pirates: "Wild Ride"; Peaked #56 on country charts
2010	Ringo Starr	Y Not
2012	Ringo Starr	Ringo 2012: (Lead parts on "Wings")
2012	Kix Brooks	New to This Town: (Lead parts on the single "New to This Town"); Single peaked #31 on country charts
2014	Foo Fighters	Sonic Highways: (Guest guitar solo on "Outside")
2015	Ringo Starr	Postcards from Paradise
2017	Ringo Starr	Give More Love
2019	Ringo Starr	What's My Name: guitar, backing vocals, rapping
2025	Ringo Starr	Look Up: slider guitar on "Rosetta"
