= All Night Long: Live in Dallas =

All Night Long: Live in Dallas 1981

Live album by Joe Walsh
- Released: 2013
- Recorded: July 10, 1981
- Venue: Reunion Arena (Dallas)
- Genre: Rock; hard rock
- Length: 1:14:53
- Label: The Orchard

Joe Walsh chronology
Analog Man (2012)	All Night Long: Live in Dallas 1981 (2013)

All Night Long: Live in Dallas is the second solo live album by the American singer-songwriter and multi-instrumentalist Joe Walsh. The album was released as for digital download in 2013, and unofficially on the CD format in March 2014.

== Background ==
The concert was recorded at the Reunion Arena in Dallas, Texas on July 10, 1981, for the King Biscuit Flower Hour radio show. At the time, Walsh was touring in support of his latest solo album There Goes the Neighborhood following the breakup of Eagles. Reunited with one of his bandmates from Barnstorm (his post-James Gang solo group), Walsh recorded a set that included solo hits, and some tracks from his years with the James Gang. The concert concluded with a cover of the Beatles' "Get Back".

== Track listing ==
No.	Title	Length
1.	"Meadows"	4:39
2.	"Over and Over"	5:31
3.	"In the City"	5:00
4.	"A Life of Illusion"	4:13
5.	"The Bomber"	9:17
6.	"Dreams"	5:45
7.	"Theme From Boat Weirdos"	3:26
8.	"Funk #49"	5:27
9.	"You Never Know"	8:55
10.	"Life's Been Good"	8:53
11.	"Rocky Mountain Way"	8:13
12.	"All Night Long"	5:30

== Personnel ==
- Joe Walsh — lead vocals, guitars, piano
- Russ Kunkel — drums
- Mike Murphy — keyboards (Reo Speedwagon)
- George "Chocolate" Perry — bass guitar, backing vocals
- Joe Vitale — drums, flute, keyboards, backing vocals
