= Joe Walsh's Greatest Hits – Little Did He Know... =

Greatest hits album by Joe Walsh
- Released: November 18, 1997
- Genre: Rock; hard rock
- Length: 75:31
- Label: MCA
- Producer: Keith Olsen; Bill Szymczyk; John Stronach; Joe Walsh

Joe Walsh chronology
Look What I Did! (1995)	Joe Walsh's Greatest Hits – Little Did He Know... (1997)	Analog Man (2012)

Professional ratings
Review scores
Source	Rating
AllMusic	4.5/5 stars

Joe Walsh's Greatest Hits – Little Did He Know... is a compilation released by guitarist Joe Walsh. It contains his best-known solo songs as well as those he recorded with the James Gang and Barnstorm, but it does not contain material he released as a member of the Eagles. The remastered reissue of the compilation Joe Walsh: The Definitive Collection (2006) has the same cover art except for differing text above the photo and no text below the photo.

== Critical reception ==
Writing for AllMusic, critic Stephen Thomas Erlewine wrote of the album "The double-disc Look What I Did! was simply too much for anyone but the dedicated Joe Walsh fan, which makes the release of the 15-song, single-disc Joe Walsh's Greatest Hits: Little Did He Know so welcome. Drawing highlights from his solo career and his early records with the James Gang, Greatest Hits contains almost every song that most fans would want".

== Track listing ==
All songs written by Joe Walsh, with additional writers noted.

No.	Title	Writer(s)	Length
1.	"Funk #49"	Dale Peters, Jim Fox	3:55
2.	"Tend My Garden"		5:32
3.	"The Bomber"	Peters, Fox, Vince Guaraldi, Maurice Ravel	7:02
4.	"Walk Away"		3:34
5.	"Midnight Man"		3:28
6.	"Mother Says"	Kenny Passarelli, Joe Vitale	5:57
7.	"Turn to Stone"		5:16
8.	"Meadows"		4:36
9.	"Rocky Mountain Way"	Passarelli, Vitale, Rocky Grace	5:15
10.	"Help Me Thru the Night"		3:37
11.	"Life's Been Good"		8:04
12.	"All Night Long"		3:32
13.	"The Confessor"		7:02
14.	"A Life of Illusion"	Passarelli	3:30
15.	"Ordinary Average Guy"		5:11

== Production ==
- Compiled and coordinated by Joe Walsh, David Spero, Andy McKaie
- Remastering: Bill Szymczyk
- Photography: Tom Wright
