= Look What I Did! =

Look What I Did!: The Joe Walsh Anthology

Compilation album by Joe Walsh
- Released: May 23, 1995
- Recorded: 1968 – 1993
- Genres: Rock; hard rock
- Length: 2:29:40
- Label: MCA
- Producer: Various
- Compilers: Joe Walsh; David Spero; Andy McKaie

Joe Walsh chronology
| A Future to This Life: Robocop – The Series Soundtrack (1995) | Look What I Did!: The Joe Walsh Anthology (1995) | Joe Walsh's Greatest Hits – Little Did He Know... (1997) |

Look What I Did! is a compilation album by American rock musician Joe Walsh, released on May 23, 1995, by MCA Records. The 2-CD set contains 34 songs from multiple albums spanning from 1968 through 1993, and offers tracks from both Walsh's solo work and when he recorded with the band James Gang.

== Critical reception ==
Professional ratings
Review scores
| Source | Rating |
|---|---|
| AllMusic | 4.5/5 stars |

Writing for AllMusic, critic Daevid Jehnzen wrote the album "features almost every worthwhile song the guitarist ever recorded..."

== Track listing ==
All songs written by Joe Walsh except where otherwise indicated.

Disc 1

| No. | Title | Writer(s) | Length |
|---|---|---|---|
| 1. | "Tuning, Part 1" | James Fox, Bert DeCoteaux, Bill Szymczyk | 0:40 |
| 2. | "Take a Look Around" | | 5:55 |
| 3. | "Funk #48" | Walsh, Fox, Tom Kriss | 2:46 |
| 4. | "The Bomber" (Original complete version) | Walsh, Dale Peters, Fox, Vince Guaraldi, Maurice Ravel | 7:02 |
| 5. | "Tend My Garden" | | 5:29 |
| 6. | "Funk #49" | Walsh, Peters, Fox | 3:56 |
| 7. | "Ashes, The Rain & I" | Walsh, Peters | 4:57 |
| 8. | "Walk Away" | | 3:33 |
| 9. | "It's All the Same" | | 4:11 |
| 10. | "Midnight Man" | | 3:29 |
| 11. | "Here We Go" | Walsh, Joe Vitale | 4:58 |
| 12. | "Midnight Visitor" | | 3:09 |
| 13. | "Mother Says" | Walsh, Kenny Passarelli, Vitale | 5:53 |
| 14. | "Turn to Stone" | Walsh, Terry Trebandt | 5:15 |
| 15. | "Comin' Down" | | 1:52 |
| 16. | "Meadows" | | 4:37 |
| 17. | "Rocky Mountain Way" | Walsh, Passarelli, Vitale, Rocky Grace | 5:40 |

Disc 2

| No. | Title | Writer(s) | Length |
|---|---|---|---|
| 1. | "Welcome to the Club" | | 5:09 |
| 2. | "All Night Laundry Mat Blues" | | 1:00 |
| 3. | "County Fair" | | 6:44 |
| 4. | "Help Me Thru The Night" | | 3:37 |
| 5. | "Life's Been Good" | | 8:03 |
| 6. | "Over And Over" | | 4:49 |
| 7. | "All Night Long" | | 3:32 |
| 8. | "A Life of Illusion" | Walsh, Passarelli | 3:30 |
| 9. | "Theme From Island Weirdos" | Walsh, Vitale | 3:20 |
| 10. | "I Can Play That Rock & Roll" | | 3:02 |
| 11. | "I.L.B.T.'s" | Walsh, Vitale | 2:52 |
| 12. | "Space Age Whiz Kids" | Walsh, Vitale | 3:41 |
| 13. | "Rosewood Bitters" | Michael Stanley | 3:28 |
| 14. | "Shut Up" | | 3:15 |
| 15. | "Decades" | | 12:13 |
| 16. | "Song for a Dying Planet" | | 2:01 |
| 17. | "Ordinary Average Guy" (Live) | | 6:03 |
