= Got Any Gum? =

Studio album by Joe Walsh
- Released: 29 October 1987
- Recorded: Early 1987
- Studio: Ardent Recordings and Alpha Sound (Memphis, Tennessee)
- Genres: Rock; new wave; hard rock; pop rock
- Length: 41:18
- Label: Warner Bros.
- Producer: Terry Manning

Joe Walsh chronology
Rocky Mountain Way (1985)	Got Any Gum? (1987)	Ordinary Average Guy (1991)

Singles from Got Any Gum?
- 1. "The Radio Song"; 2. "In My Car"

Got Any Gum? is the eighth solo studio album by the American singer-songwriter Joe Walsh. It was originally released in October 1987, on the label Warner Brothers in the United States, and Full Moon in the UK, which was the last Walsh album to be released by either of those labels. The album features eight original songs which were written by Walsh with others and by himself, the album also features two covers, including the song "In My Car", which was co-written by Walsh with Ringo Starr, the former drummer for The Beatles (the song was originally released on Starr's ninth studio solo album Old Wave, in 1983). The album also features vocal contributions from JD Souther and Survivor's lead vocalist Jimi Jamison.

The album was received negatively by the majority of music critics, while other reviewers noted good points to the album. It was also a commercial disappointment, peaking at #113 on the Billboard 200, which marked the beginning of a downturn in Walsh's fortunes on the album charts, and ultimately led to both Warner Bros. and Full Moon dropping him from their labels. Two singles were issued from Got Any Gum?: "The Radio Song" and "In My Car". The album's first and leading single, "The Radio Song," unlike the album, was a commercial success, peaking at No. 8 on the Mainstream Rock Tracks chart. Its music video featured the legendary DJ Wolfman Jack.

== Album title ==
In an interview with Howard Stern in October 1987, Walsh, while intoxicated, was asked about whether the album's title had a background, to which Walsh immediately responded "Yeah, a bum!, I saw a bum about a block away and I knew he was going to ask me for spare change, so I reach in - I'm all ready but he gets up to me and I say 'here, help yourself.' He says 'I don't need money, ya got any gum?'"

== Production and recording ==
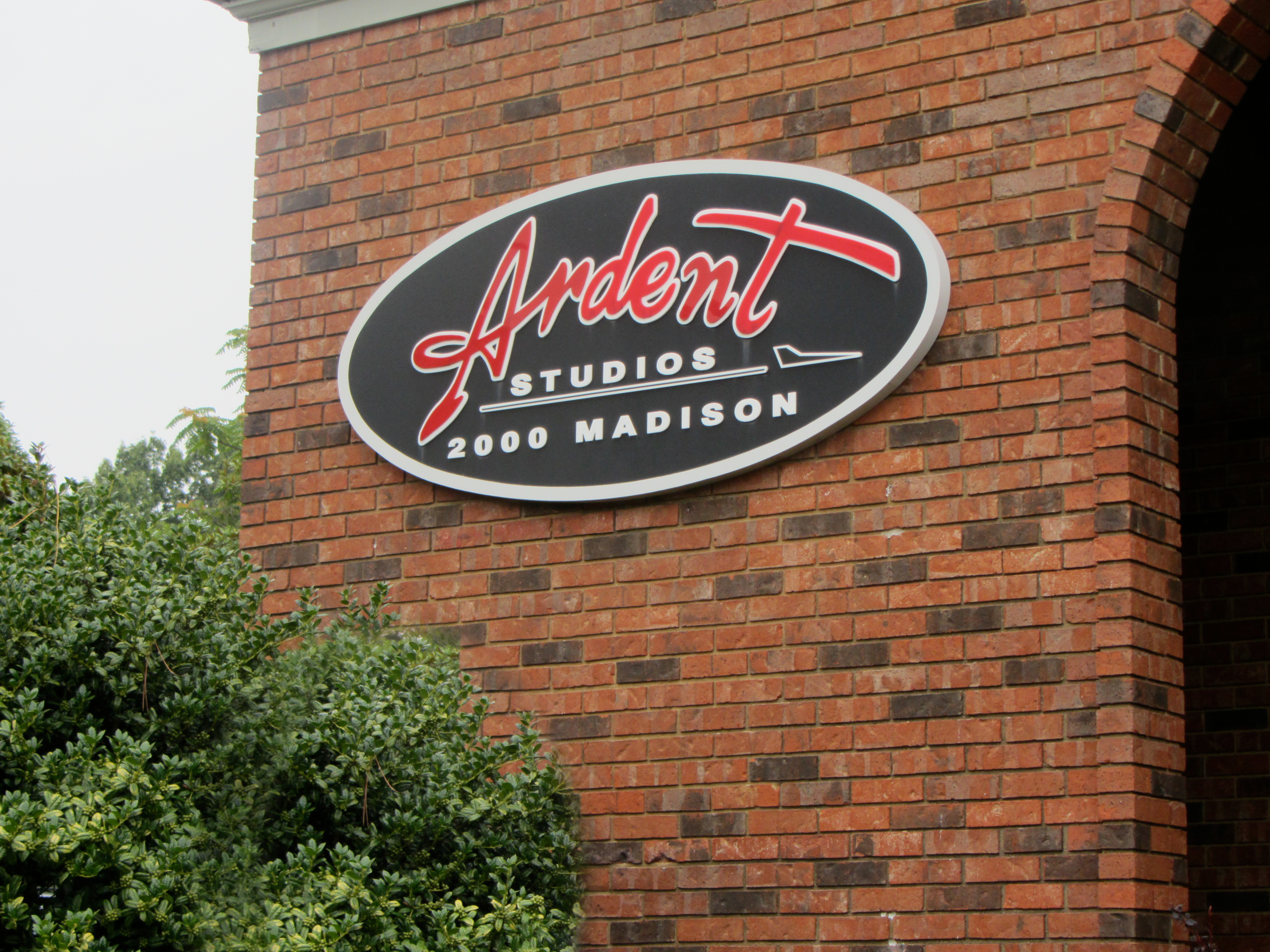
Ardent Studios, pictured in 2013, where Got Any Gum? was recorded.

Following the tepid reaction to his 1985 studio album The Confessor, Joe Walsh decided that it was time for a change of pace in his solo career. In an attempt to give his music an even more contemporary sound, he joined forces with Terry Manning as the right person to produce his new album. Manning made the list of personnel to be featured on the album, but the only other musician that Walsh knew before this time was JD Souther, who arranged and provided backing vocals. Beginning in early 1987, Walsh began recording Got Any Gum?, having written eight new songs with others and by himself, at Ardent Recordings and Alpha Sound, in Memphis, Tennessee.

During the making of this album, the former Barnstorm drummer, Joe Vitale introduced the prolific session musician Rick Rosas to Walsh and they became quite good friends. Under the tongue-in-cheek pseudonym "Rick the Bass Player", Rosas played bass guitar on the fifth track, "Half of the Time". After the album was finished, Rosas and Walsh went on to tour and record together, including work on three of his last solo albums, Ordinary Average Guy, Songs for a Dying Planet, and the most recent Analog Man.

== Cover artwork ==
Back cover of the Got Any Gum? album

The album's cover photograph, which was taken by Carole Manning, is of the Memphian Theater, which first opened in 1935. In 1985, two years before the release of this album, the Memphian Theater was closed. It later became the venue for live theatre troupe "Circuit Playhouse", from which it currently takes its name. The theater is possibly best known as one of the favorite hangouts for Elvis Presley, who often rented the theater to watch the latest films with his friends and fans.

The album's back cover depicts Walsh in front of a vintage car, 1962 Ford Thunderbird while blowing up a big bubble, with gum. The album's inner sleeve photography depicts Walsh with bubble gum popped on the outside of his face while grinning. The back cover also includes a dedication to Walsh's daughter Lucy, who is also the niece of Ringo Starr.

== Critical reception ==
Professional ratings
Retrospective reviews
Review scores
Source	Rating
AllMusic	2/5 stars
iTunes	(Positive)

James Chrispell of AllMusic retrospectively gave the album two out of five stars and wrote that "There's nothing sadder than seeing a talented artist come up with a real bummer, but that's just what this record is." adding that "Perhaps this is one of those contractual obligation albums you hear so much about." iTunes has given the album a positive review, writing, "Got Any Gum? has been widely misunderstood, mostly because it bears little resemblance to his beloved '70s output," also noting it "had spawned its own genre of decadent, heart-pumping pop-rock music."

== Track listing ==
All tracks are written by Joe Walsh, except where noted.

Side one
No.	Title	Writer(s)	Length
1.	"The Radio Song"		3:31
2.	"Fun"	Joe Walsh; Joe Vitale	3:04
3.	"In My Car"	Walsh; Richard Starkey; Mo Foster; Kim Goody	3:37
4.	"Malibu"	Walsh; Vitale	5:11
5.	"Half of the Time"		5:11

Side two
No.	Title	Writer(s)	Length
6.	"Got Any Gum?" (Instrumental)	Terry Manning; Walsh	1:11
7.	"Up to Me"		5:21
8.	"No Peace in the Jungle"	Tommy Dean	5:57
9.	"Memory Lane"		4:27
10.	"Time"		4:09
Total length:			41:18

== Personnel ==
Credits are adapted from the album's liner notes.

Musicians

- Joe Walsh – lead and background vocals; guitar; synthesizer; keyboards
- Terry Manning – keyboards; E-mu Emulator; piano; backing vocals
- Dave Cochran – bass guitar
- Chad Cromwell – drums; percussion

Additional musicians

- Mark Rivera – saxophone on "Half of the Time" and "No Peace in the Jungle"
- Rick Rosas (credited as "Rick the Bass Player") – bass guitar on "Half of the Time"
- Jimi Jamison – backing vocals
- JD Souther (credited as "John David Souther") – backing vocals

Production and artwork

- Terry Manning – producer; engineer
- Kevin Allison – production coordination
- David "Snake" Reynolds – assistant engineer
- Bob Ludwig – mastering
- Kevin Allison – equipment technician
- JD Souther – vocal arrangement
- Alan Wyse – synthesizer programming
- Carole Manning – art direction; photography

== Charts ==
Chart (1987)	Peak position
US Billboard 200	113

== See also ==
- List of albums released in 1987
- Joe Walsh discography
