= The Radio Song (Joe Walsh song) =

Single by Joe Walsh

from the album Got Any Gum?
- B-side: "How Ya Doin'?"
- Released: 1987
- Recorded: Early 1987
- Studio: Ardent Recordings and Alpha Sound (Memphis, Tennessee)
- Genre: Pop rock; new wave
- Length: 3:31
- Label: Warner Bros.
- Songwriter: Joe Walsh
- Producer: Terry Manning

Joe Walsh singles chronology
"The Confessor" (1985)	"The Radio Song" (1987)	"In My Car" (1987)

Music video
- "The Radio Song" on YouTube

"The Radio Song" is a song by American rock musician Joe Walsh, the guitarist for the Eagles. It was released as a lead single from his eighth solo studio album, Got Any Gum? (1987). It was Walsh's fourteenth single and features the non-album track, "How Ya Doin'?" as its B-side.

== Background ==
The album Got Any Gum? (1987) was not a commercial success, but this track was a radio hit, peaking at No. 8 on the Billboard's Hot Mainstream Rock Tracks charts.

== Music video ==
The music video starts with the disc jockey (DJ), Wolfman Jack, introducing Walsh from a radio station booth. Walsh sits behind him, making faces and imitating Wolfman when he's not watching.

As the song actually starts, we have shots of Walsh as the DJ in the radio booth. Throughout the video, different singers appear next to him at the microphone – old-fashioned male singers, some Supremes-type singers, and a children's choir. When Walsh is not behind the desk as the DJ, he moves across the foreground of the screen with a guitar. Intercut with these scenes are Walsh playing a couple of "characters" like a drummer with backwards ball cap.

During the guitar solo, Walsh runs out of the radio station, which collapses behind him, and he finds himself in a field with several searchlights trained on him. In the field, he plays his guitar as the searchlights pan back and forth. The video ends on another searchlight segment as he runs away across the field.

There is also a reference to John Lennon's album cover for Mind Games (1973).
