= Rocky Mountain Way (album) =

Compilation album by Joe Walsh
- Released: September 30, 1985
- Recorded: 1979–1983
- Genres: Rock; hard rock
- Length: 46:23
- Label: MCA Special Products
- Producer: Joe Walsh

Joe Walsh chronology
The Confessor (1985)	Rocky Mountain Way (1985)	Got Any Gum? (1987)

Professional ratings
Review scores
Source	Rating
AllMusic	2/5 stars

Rocky Mountain Way is a compilation album by American rock musician Joe Walsh, released on September 30, 1985 by MCA Special Products.

== Critical reception ==
Writing retrospectively for AllMusic, critic Ben Davies wrote of the album "considering both the amount of classic Walsh songs not featured on Rocky Mountain Way and the many other more extensive and better chosen best-ofs available, this release is rather pointless."

== Track listing ==
All songs by Joe Walsh, except where noted.

No.	Title	Writer(s)	Length
1.	"Rocky Mountain Way"	Rocke Grace, Kenny Passarelli, Joe Vitale, Joe Walsh	5:14
2.	"Turn to Stone"	Walsh, Terry Trebandt	5:17
3.	"County Fair"	Walsh, Trebandt	6:43
4.	"Meadows"	Walsh, Patrick Cullie	4:40
5.	"I'll Tell the World"	Vitale	3:56
6.	"Days Gone By"		5:58
7.	"Wolf"		3:11
8.	"Welcome to the Club"		5:14
9.	"Time Out" (CD only)		4:14
10.	"Comin' Down" (CD only)		1:56
