= In My Car =

In My Car may refer to:

- "In My Car" (The Beach Boys song)
- "In My Car" (Ringo Starr song)
