= Songs for a Dying Planet =

Studio album by Joe Walsh
- Released: May 1992
- Recorded: February–May 1992
- Studio: Reflection Sound (Charlotte, North Carolina); Kiva West Studio (Los Angeles)
- Genre: Rock; hard rock
- Length: 48:38
- Label: Epic
- Producer: Bill Szymczyk; Joe Vitale

Joe Walsh chronology
Ordinary Average Guy (1991)	Songs for a Dying Planet (1992)	A Future to This Life: Robocop – The Series Soundtrack (1995)

Songs for a Dying Planet is the tenth solo studio album by American musician Joe Walsh, released in May 1992 by Epic Records. Keen to re-establish himself after his ill-received previous studio album, Ordinary Average Guy (1991), Walsh enlisted his former record producer Bill Szymczyk. At the end of the track "Certain Situations," one can hear a Morse code message that says "Register and vote for me."

The album was received negatively by the majority of music critics and it was also a commercial disappointment, missing the album charts on both sides of the Atlantic, which called an end to Walsh's solo career for 20 years before he released another studio album in 2012 called Analog Man. The song "Vote for Me" however was a minor success, peaking at number 10 on the Hot Mainstream Rock Tracks chart.

== Critical reception ==
Professional ratings
Review scores
Source	Rating
AllMusic	2.5/5 stars
Entertainment Weekly	F

Reviewing for AllMusic, critic Vincent Jeffries wrote that the album "fulfills [those] expectations to a degree, but the songwriter's weakened comedic instincts and extreme sincerity make Songs for a Dying Planet a difficult recommendation."

== Track listing ==
All tracks are written by Joe Walsh, except where noted.

No.	Title	Writer(s)	Length
1.	"Shut Up"		3:19
2.	"Fairbanks Alaska"		3:27
3.	"Coyote Love"	Joe Vitale; Walsh	4:43
4.	"I Know"		1:45
5.	"Certain Situations"		4:34
6.	"Vote for Me"	Vitale, Walsh	4:21
7.	"Theme from Baroque Weirdos"	Bill Szymczyk; Vitale	1:33
8.	"The Friend Song"		3:33
9.	"It's All Right"		3:25
10.	"Will You Still Love Me Tomorrow"	Gerry Goffin; Carole King	3:59
11.	"Decades"		12:02
12.	"Song for a Dying Planet"		2:00
Total length:			48:38

== Personnel ==
- Joe Walsh – lead vocals, keyboards, guitars, percussion, trombone
- Joe Vitale – keyboards, drums, percussion, flute, backing vocals
- Dale Peters – bass guitar
- Rick Rosas – bass guitar
- Jim Brock – percussion
- Jimi Jamison – backing vocals

== Production ==
- Scott MacLellan – executive producer
- Bill Szymczyk – producer, engineer, mixing
- Joe Vitale – co-producer
- Mark Williams – co-engineer, mixing
- Mark Herman – assistant engineer
- Tracey Schroeder – assistant engineer
- Ted Jensen – mastering
- Dawn Patrol – art direction, design
- Assheton Gorton – artwork ("Three Men in a Boat")
- David Spero – management

Studios

- Recorded at Reflection Sound Studios (Charlotte, North Carolina).
- Mixed at Kiva Recording Studio (Memphis, Tennessee).
- Mastered at Sterling Sound (New York City, New York).

== Charts ==
Singles – Billboard (United States)

Year	Single	Chart	Position
1992	"Vote for Me"	Mainstream Rock Tracks	10

== See also ==
- List of albums released in 1992
- Joe Walsh discography
