= Ordinary Average Guy =

Studio album by Joe Walsh
- Released: April 23, 1991
- Recorded: August 1990
- Genres: Rock; hard rock
- Length: 47:44
- Label: Epic
- Producers: Joe Walsh; Joe Vitale

Joe Walsh chronology
| Got Any Gum? (1987) | Ordinary Average Guy (1991) | Songs for a Dying Planet (1992) |

Ordinary Average Guy is the ninth solo studio album by American singer-songwriter and multi-instrumentalist Joe Walsh. The album was released in mid 1991. It was Walsh's first album of entirely new music since Got Any Gum? in 1987, and his first solo album to be issued internationally by Epic following a four-year alliance with Warner Bros. Records in the United States and Canada. The album features Ringo Starr, Survivor's lead vocalist Jimi Jamison, and the drummer Joe Vitale from Walsh's former band Barnstorm. Vitale also sings the lead vocals on the final track of the album, "School Days".

== Critical reception ==
Professional ratings
Review scores
| Source | Rating |
|---|---|
| AllMusic | 2/5 stars |

Writing for AllMusic, critic Vincent Jeffries wrote of the album "This collection of nostalgia, decent balladry, and quirky anthems probably reinforced any notions of Joe Walsh's creative decline... this reflective, sometimes half-hearted effort belies a weariness that's both sad and difficult to appreciate as this master goes through the motions."

== Track listing ==
All songs by Joe Walsh, except where noted.

| No. | Title | Writer(s) | Length |
|---|---|---|---|
| 1. | "Two Sides to Every Story" | Rick Rosas, Walsh | 3:24 |
| 2. | "Ordinary Average Guy" | | 4:12 |
| 3. | "The Gamma Goochee" | John Mangiagli | 2:49 |
| 4. | "All of a Sudden" | Jimi Jamison, Walsh | 4:56 |
| 5. | "Alphabetical Order" | Joe Vitale, Walsh | 4:58 |
| 6. | "Look at Us Now" | Jamison, Walsh | 4:55 |
| 7. | "I'm Actin' Different" | | 4:31 |
| 8. | "Up All Night" | Vitale, Walsh | 3:54 |
| 9. | "You Might Need Somebody" | Nan O'Byrne, Tom Snow | 4:30 |
| 10. | "Where I Grew up (Prelude to School Days)" | | 2:37 |
| 11. | "School Days" | Vitale | 5:18 |

== Personnel ==
- Joe Walsh – vocals, keyboards, guitars
- Joe Vitale – keyboards, drums, percussion, vocals, lead vocals (11)
- Waddy Wachtel – guitars (5)
- Rick Rosas – bass (1–4, 6–11), vocals
- George "Chocolate" Perry – bass (5)
- Chad Cromwell – drums, percussion
- Otis Lawrence – saxophones
- Kelly Hurt – backing vocals
- Lavestia Miller – backing vocals
- Al Paris – backing vocals
- Jeffrey Rogers – backing vocals

== Production ==
- Scott MacLellan – executive producer
- Joe Walsh – producer
- Joe Vitale – producer
- Dave Reynolds – recording, mixing
- Jim Nipar – recording (5)
- Bill Szymczyk – recording (5)
- Tim Ray – recording assistant, mix assistant
- Jim Stabile – recording assistant
- John Walls – recording assistant, mix assistant
- Vlado Meller – mastering
- David Coleman – art direction
- Alan Messer – photography
- Patrick Cullie – barn photography
- Willie Gibson – barn photography

Studios

- Recorded at Pyramid Recording Studio (Lookout Mountain, Tennessee) and Kiva Recording Studio (Memphis, Tennessee).
- Mixed at Kiva Recording Studio
- Mastered at Sony Music Studios (New York City, New York).

== Charts ==
| Chart (1991) | Peak position |
|---|---|
| Canada Top Albums/CDs (RPM) | 31 |
| US Billboard 200 | 112 |

== See also ==
- List of albums released in 1991
- Joe Walsh discography
