= You Bought It – You Name It =

Studio album by Joe Walsh
- Released: June 1983
- Genres: Rock; hard rock; pop rock; blues rock
- Length: 38:23
- Label: Warner Bros.
- Producers: Joe Walsh; George "Chocolate" Perry; Bill Szymczyk

Joe Walsh chronology
There Goes the Neighborhood (1981)	You Bought It – You Name It (1983)	The Confessor (1985)

You Bought It – You Name It is the sixth studio album by the American singer-songwriter and multi-instrumentalist Joe Walsh. The album was released in mid 1983, on the label Warner Bros., two years after Walsh's successful album There Goes the Neighborhood. It was Walsh's second and final studio album to feature George "Chocolate" Perry as producer.

The album was received negatively by the majority of music critics, while other reviewers noted good points to the album. It was also not as successful as Walsh's previous albums, peaking at #48 on the Billboard 200. However, Walsh found some moderate success with the single "Space Age Whiz Kids", about the pinnacle of the 1980s video arcade craze. The single peaked at #52 on the US Billboard Hot 100 chart, and at #21 on the Hot Mainstream Rock Tracks chart. An outtake from The Long Run (1979), "Told You So" features a guest appearance from former Eagles' member Don Felder (who also co-wrote the track). The album also features contributions from two other Eagles' members Don Henley, and Timothy B. Schmit, as well as former REO Speedwagon lead singer Mike Murphy, session guitarist Waddy Wachtel, and the drummer Joe Vitale from Walsh's former band Barnstorm.

== Cover artwork ==
The cover art for the album features an American aircraft carrier, USS Yorktown, at the Battle of Midway after being hit by enemy bombers that appears to be on fire (smoke is coming out of the funnel from damage to the funnel uptakes and engineering spaces). There is also someone in a fireman suit that has his feet up on the bench behind Walsh who is sitting on the bench next to him, while reading a book titled "Aircraft Carrier". On the back sleeve of the album, Walsh is holding a photograph of the fireman suit with the face cut out so his face appears through it. Additionally, the single release of the song "Space Age Whiz Kids" used the same image of Walsh.

== Production and recording ==
After the success of his album There Goes the Neighborhood, Walsh decided that it was time to record its follow-up, and in July 1982, Walsh asked Bill Szymczyk to produce his new album and Walsh came up with the idea that he was going to rent a 2-inch 16-track non Dolby mobile truck to record the album, but Szymczyk disagreed with the idea completely, and Walsh immediately fired him. They later decided to record the album there and began working on the album in late September that year. They went to the Santa Catalina Island outside of Los Angeles for a 14-day recording session and recorded six of the album's ten tracks in an old ballroom on the island. The other four tracks for the album were recorded in a different studio; the album was not finished until the end of the year. The album contains hard rock songs such as "I Can Play That Rock & Roll" and a cover of the Dick Haymes track "Love Letters". It also contains more introspective material such as "Class of '65", and a song titled "I.L.B.T.s", an initialization for "I Like Big Tits".

== Critical reception ==
Professional ratings
Review scores
Source	Rating
AllMusic	2/5 stars
Robert Christgau	B+

In a contemporary review, music critic Robert Christgau wrote that the album is "Joe Walsh's Comedy Album" adding that the album features "one pop standard gone studio-reggae, the ultimate (last?) video-game song, a cross between "Boobs a Lot" and "Dolly Parton's Hits," "Class of '65" for bathetic relief, and a song called "I Can Play That Rock & Roll" that isn't stupid (though it comes close)." In a retrospective review for AllMusic, critic James Chrispell wrote of the album "Rather retro in feel, like the title, it harkens back to a wackier time. Good, but flawed."

== Track listing ==
All tracks are written by Joe Walsh, except where noted.

Side one
No.	Title	Writer(s)	Length
1.	"I Can Play That Rock & Roll"		3:03
2.	"Told You So"	Don Felder; Walsh	3:54
3.	"Here We Are Now"		3:54
4.	"The Worry Song"	George "Chocolate" Perry; Walsh	4:37
5.	"I.L.B.T.s"	Joe Vitale; Walsh	2:53

Side two
No.	Title	Writer(s)	Length
6.	"Space Age Whiz Kids"	Vitale; Walsh	3:40
7.	"Love Letters"	Edward Heyman; Victor Young	3:11
8.	"Class of '65"		4:27
9.	"Shadows"		5:09
10.	"Theme from Island Weirdos"	Vitale; Walsh	3:35
Total length:			38:23

== Personnel ==
Credits are adapted from the album's liner notes.

- Joe Walsh – lead vocals, synthesizers, guitars, slide guitar, LinnDrum
- Joe Vitale – grand piano, bass, drums, Syndrums, backing vocals
- Waddy Wachtel – rhythm guitar, guitar synthesizer
- George "Chocolate" Perry – bass

Additional personnel

- Don Felder – lead guitar (2)
- Kevin Dukes – rhythm guitar (6, 7)
- Joe Pruessner – bass (8)
- Don Henley – backing vocals (3)
- Timothy B. Schmit – backing vocals (3)
- Mike Murphy – backing vocals (8)

== Production ==
- Bill Szymczyk – producer
- Joe Walsh – producer
- George "Chocolate" Perry – producer
- Jim Nipar – engineer
- Terry Nelson – assistant engineer
- Jeff Hanson – head technical engineer
- Scott Stogel – head technical engineer
- Paul du Gré – assistant technical engineer
- Mark Eshelman – assistant technical engineer
- Ted Jensen – mastering
- Jeff Adamoff – art direction, design
- Jim Shea – photography
- Bob Jacobs – artwork, hand coloring
- Irving Azoff – management for Front Line Entertainment

Studios

- Recorded at The Casino Ballroom (Avalon, Catalina Island) and Santa Barbara Sound Recording (Santa Barbara, California).
- Mastered at Sterling Sound (New York City, New York).

== Charts ==
Chart (1983)	Peak position
Canada Top Albums/CDs (RPM)	79
US Billboard 200	48

== See also ==
- List of albums released in 1983
- Joe Walsh discography
