= There Goes the Neighborhood (album) =

Studio album by Joe Walsh
- Released: May 1981
- Recorded: 1973, October – November 1980
- Studios: Santa Barbara Sound Recording (Santa Barbara, California)
- Genres: Rock; pop rock; soft rock
- Length: 35:37
- Label: Asylum
- Producer: Joe Walsh

Joe Walsh chronology
The Best of Joe Walsh (1978)	There Goes the Neighborhood (1981)	You Bought It – You Name It (1983)

Singles from There Goes the Neighborhood
- 1. "A Life of Illusion" Released: May 1981; 2. "Made Your Mind Up" Released: 1981; 3. "Rivers (Of the Hidden Funk)" Released: 1981; 4. "Things" Released: 1981

There Goes the Neighborhood is the fifth solo studio album by the American singer-songwriter, multi-instrumentalist Joe Walsh. The album was recorded shortly after the breakup of his band the Eagles and released in May 1981, by Asylum Records, three years after Walsh's album But Seriously, Folks... (1978).

The album features contributions from two Eagles' members Don Felder and Timothy B. Schmit as well as session musicians including Russ Kunkel, David Lindley, Bob Mayo, and Victor Feldman.

The album peaked at No. 20 on the Billboard 200. The album only spawned one charting single, "A Life of Illusion", which would become one of Walsh's most popular songs and reached No. 34 at on the Billboard Hot 100. The single also topped the Hot Mainstream Rock Tracks chart.

== Cover artwork ==
The cover art for the album features Walsh leaning, while at the top of an American tank with rubble around him. Additionally, the single release of the song "A Life of Illusion" used the same image of Walsh. The promotional video for the track shows the coming to life of the album's cover. In the cover photograph, office complex Century City, in Los Angeles, is in the background.

== Background ==
"A Life of Illusion" was recorded in 1973 with Joe Walsh's first solo band Barnstorm but was not completed. The overdubs and final mixes were completed during the There Goes the Neighborhood sessions and released on the album. This song also appeared in the opening credits of The 40-Year-Old Virgin (2005) and appears as the first song on its soundtrack.

Another track "Rivers (Of the Hidden Funk)" was a track Walsh wrote for the Eagles' sixth studio album The Long Run (1979), but was left off. The track featured a guest appearance by Walsh's Eagles-mate Don Felder (who co-wrote the track) on talk box guitar.

The album's final track "You Never Know" is a song about rumors and hearsay, including not-so-veiled swipes at other members of the Eagles and their management with lines like "The Frontline grapevine jury's in a nasty mood / you might be guilty, honey, you never know." (Frontline Management was Irving Azoff's management firm at the time). Don Felder appears on guitar on this track performing rhythm and dual lead guitar solos with Walsh.

Eagles bandmate Timothy B. Schmit sang backing vocals on the opening track "Things".

== Critical reception ==
Professional ratings
Review scores
Source	Rating
AllMusic	4.5/5 stars
Rolling Stone	2/5 stars

AllMusic's Ben Davies wrote: "Joe Walsh's long and varied career has had its ups and downs, to say the least. Here, you see Walsh in good old rock form... The rock legend's trademark sound is prominently featured throughout the album, and undoubtedly here he performs some of his finest solos. The only qualm that one can pick is that the whole album is in a much-similar vein."

Record World called the single "Made Your Mind Up" a "real toe-tapper [that] features a compelling arrangement."

== Track listing ==
All songs written and composed by Joe Walsh, except where noted.

Side one
No.	Title	Writer(s)	Length
1.	"Things"		5:40
2.	"Made Your Mind Up"		4:24
3.	"Down on the Farm"		3:10
4.	"Rivers (Of the Hidden Funk)"	Walsh; Don Felder	5:06

Side two
No.	Title	Writer(s)	Length
5.	"A Life of Illusion"	Kenny Passarelli; Walsh	3:30
6.	"Bones"	Walsh; Joe Vitale	4:32
7.	"Rockets"		3:55
8.	"You Never Know"		5:20
Total length:			35:37

== Personnel ==
Musicians

- Joe Walsh – vocals, guitars, acoustic piano (1), synthesizers (1), keyboards (2), jawharp (3), organ (4), noises (7)
- Tom Stephenson – organ (5)
- Don Felder – guitars (4, 8), talk box (4)
- Bob Mayo – 12-string guitar (4)
- Kenny Passarelli – guitarrón (5), trumpet (5)
- George "Chocolate" Perry – bass (1–4, 6, 7, 8), backing vocals (1), percussion (7)
- Joe Vitale – drums, backing vocals (1, 2, 7), tambourine (4), acoustic piano (6)
- Russ Kunkel – triangle (3)
- Victor Feldman – percussion (8)
- David Lindley – violin (3, 6), backing vocals (6)
- Timothy B. Schmit – backing vocals (1)
- Jody Boyer – backing vocals (4, 6, 8)

Production and artwork

- Joe Walsh – producer
- Jim Nipar – recording, mixing
- James Geddes – recording assistant, mix assistant
- Mike Reese – mastering
- Jeff Adamoff – art direction, design
- Jim Shea – photography
- Todd Andrews – sleeve photography
- Irving Azoff – management for Front Line Entertainment
- Recorded and mixed at Santa Barbara Sound Recording (Santa Barbara, California).
- Mastered at The Mastering Lab (Hollywood, California).

== Charts ==
Chart (1981)	Peak position
Australian Albums (Kent Music Report)	63
Canada Top Albums/CDs (RPM)	27
US Billboard 200	20

== See also ==
- List of albums released in 1981
- Joe Walsh discography
