= The Confessor (album) =

Studio album by Joe Walsh
- Released: May 21, 1985
- Recorded: 1984
- Studios: Goodnight LA Studios (Van Nuys, Los Angeles)
- Genres: Hard rock; pop rock; folk rock; blues rock; reggae fusion
- Length: 36:15
- Label: Warner Bros.
- Producers: Joe Walsh; Keith Olsen

Joe Walsh chronology
You Bought It – You Name It (1983)	The Confessor (1985)	Rocky Mountain Way (1985)

Singles from The Confessor (album)
- 1. "The Confessor" Released: 1985

The Confessor is the seventh solo studio album by American rock musician Joe Walsh, released on May 21, 1985 by Warner Bros. Records, and Full Moon Records. It was produced by Grammy Award-winning producer and sound engineer Keith Olsen as well as Walsh himself. The album peaked at number 65 on the Billboard 200.

== Album artwork ==
The cover art for the album features one of a series of similar paintings called Two Men Contemplating the Moon (1819–1820), by the German Romantic landscape painter Caspar David Friedrich, with a grainy photograph of Walsh in behind. The back cover is another painting by Friedrich, Wanderer above the Sea of Fog (c. 1818).

== Composition ==
The album includes a cover version of Michael Stanley's 1973 song "Rosewood Bitters," which got some FM airplay in the US; Walsh played slide guitar on the original recording which Stanley originally recorded. On this version instead he plays an electric guitar.

"Slow Dancing" is a song written by Loz Netto for Walsh. Netto was the guitarist in the English band Moon from the mid 1970s and the band Sniff 'n' the Tears from the late 1970s.

A variety of styles are explored on this album, including elements of blues, pop, and even Caribbean music. The title song is more in the vein of progressive rock.

== Recording ==
Walsh's new girlfriend Stevie Nicks would get involved with the recording of this album, as her old friend Keith Olsen was hired to produce the album. The superimposed LA session stalwarts like Jim Keltner, Mike Porcaro, Waddy Wachtel, Randy Newman, Alan Pasqua and a lot of musicians Walsh had never worked with before were the musicians who played on the album. However, the only familiar face was Timothy B. Schmit (of the Eagles) who only recorded backing vocals.

== Critical reception ==
Professional ratings
Review scores
Source	Rating
AllMusic	2.5/5 stars

Upon its release, the album was poorly received by many critics but sold quite well. Guitar World critic Bruce Malamut wrote that the album is "the apologia of a strictly raised mid-western episcopalian after living in rock and roll sin for 'Fifteen Years' on the road," and that "The balance … is a sober retrospective from rock’s own Harpo Marx." Rolling Stone said that "Walsh is trying to make the kind of record he used to make a decade ago, and the result is, well, out of date, sound [sic] like something out of a 1975 time capsule." Writing retrospectively for AllMusic, critic James Chrispell highly complimented the title track, but wrote of the album "Joe Walsh just hasn't been able to produce a complete album of great material, and The Confessor is no exception. The first half is dreck... Worthwhile for the title track alone."

== Live performances and Tour ==
After the release of the album, Walsh toured again with Joe Vitale in Australia and in the US. In Australia the band was called Creatures from America. In the US they were the opening act on some gigs for British-American rock band Foreigner.

"The Confessor" and "Good Man Down" were the only tracks from this album which were performed live on that tour.

== Track listing ==
All tracks are written by Joe Walsh, except where noted.

Side one
No.	Title	Writer(s)	Length
1.	"Problems"	Walsh; Bill Arbuckle	3:55
2.	"I Broke My Leg"		3:12
3.	"Bubbles"		3:33
4.	"Slow Dancing"	Loz Netto	4:22
5.	"15 Years"		3:52

Side two
No.	Title	Writer(s)	Length
6.	"The Confessor"		7:06
7.	"Rosewood Bitters"	Michael Stanley	3:29
8.	"Good Man Down"	Walsh; Waddy Wachtel	4:14
9.	"Dear John"		2:40
Total length:			36:15

== Personnel ==
Musicians

- Joe Walsh – lead vocals, synthesizers, lead guitars, bass, talk box
- Waddy Wachtel – guitars
- Randy Newman, Alan Pasqua – keyboards
- Mark Andes, Dennis Belfield, Mike Porcaro, David Margen, Keith Olsen, Rick Rosas – bass
- Denny Carmassi, Jim Keltner, Rick Marotta, Chet McCracken, Jeff Porcaro – drums
- Jerry Peterson – saxophones
- Earl Lon Price – tenor saxophone
- Kenneth Tussing – trombone
- Timothy B. Schmit – backing vocals

== Production ==
- Joe Walsh – producer
- Keith Olsen – producer
  - Although uncredited, Walsh (in a June 2012 interview on Howard Stern) stated that Stevie Nicks "rode shotgun" with him during the production of this album.

Engineering

- Keith Olsen – engineer
- Dennis Sager – engineer
- Goodnight LA Studios (Van Nuys, California) – recording and mixing location
- Greg Fulginiti – mastering at Artisan Sound Recorders (Hollywood, California)

Album artwork

- Hugh Kent Brown – art direction, design
- Caspar David Friedrich – paintings
- The titles of the paintings by Friedrich:
  - Front cover: Two Men Contemplating the Moon (1819–1820)
  - Back cover: Wanderer above the Sea of Fog (c. 1818)

== Charts ==
Chart (1985)	Peak position
Canada Top Albums/CDs (RPM)	91
New Zealand Albums (RMNZ)	32
US Billboard 200	65

== See also ==
- 1985 in music#May
- Joe Walsh discography
