= David Spero =

American radio DJ (born 1951)

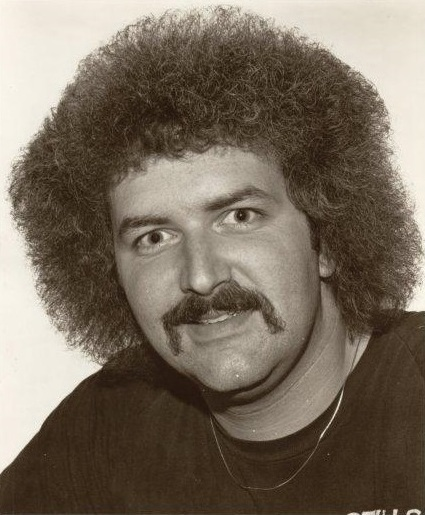
- Born: August 15, 1951 (age 74); Shaker Heights, Ohio, U.S.
- Occupations: DJ; manager; producer; executive
- Spouse: Ellen Spero
- Children: 1

David Spero is an American music manager and former radio personality who was active in rock-radio during the 1970s. He is the owner of the Cleveland office of Alliance Artists Ltd.

== Radio DJ ==
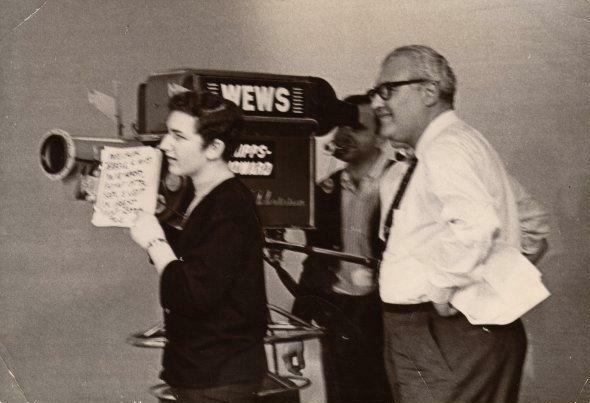
David and Herman Spero on The Upbeat Show in 1964

At the age of 13, before beginning his career as a DJ at WXEN (now WHLK), WNCR (now WGAR-FM), WMMS, M105-FM (now WMJI), and WNCX, Spero worked as a cue card holder on The Upbeat Show which his father, Herman Spero, produced. At 15, Spero was helping to set the order of songs as a co-writer and assistant producer of the show. In describing the show, Spero explained that it was like Dick Clark's American Bandstand in that it featured the newest performers and their music, but unlike Clark's show, which had just one act and mostly dancing, Upbeat had eight or more live acts each week.

At the age of 16, Spero got his start in radio on WXEN's graveyard shift. Shortly after WXEN, Spero moved to WNCR and then WMMS at around 19 years of age. While still living with his parents, Spero got a break at WNCR when radio host Don Imus helped him get promoted to the morning spot on the station. As a DJ at WMMS in the 1970s, Spero interviewed most of the rock stars who went to Cleveland. In fact, Humble Pie credits Spero for breaking the band locally in the US. And, although his fellow DJ "Kid Leo" is widely credited with breaking Bruce Springsteen, it was Spero who "told fellow WMMR [sic] DJ 'Kid Leo' about Springsteen."

== Michael Stanley ==
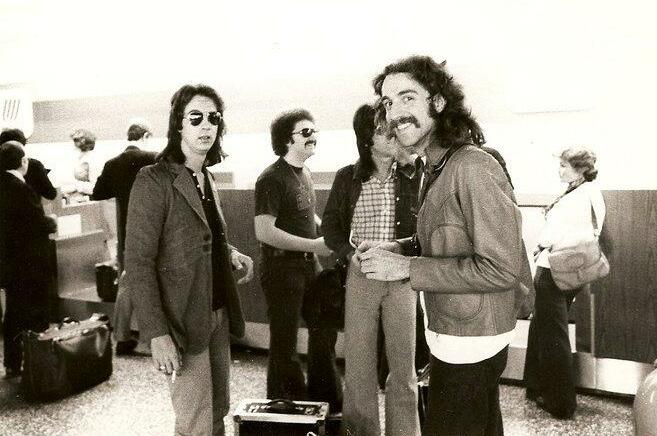
left to right: Michael Stanley, David Spero and Jonah Koslen, circa 1973

In the spring of 1974, Spero took a break from being a DJ and resigned as the afternoon drive host on WMMS to manage Michael Stanley's career. Spero managed the Michael Stanley Band during their early building process. According to Jim Girard of Citi-Music Magazine, Spero used his influence to get the band a deal with Epic Records, although Spero credits Bill Szymczyk and Irving Azoff – Joe Walsh's manager at the time, with getting Michael's new band signed. Michael Stanley's second solo album, Friends and Legends, was the first project Spero was involved with as his manager.

Spero was managing Stanley when his band opened for the Eagles on tour, thus Spero gained valuable experience in managing a band and developed a relationship with the Eagles, both of which proved helpful to Spero's career.

In 1978 Spero returned to radio at Cleveland's M105-FM (now WMJI) both to avoid the travel since he was newly married and because he missed working in radio.

== Columbia Pictures ==
Radio felt increasingly corporate and no longer held the same appeal for Spero, so he again looked for a change in career. Even as he kept a foot in the door with radio via a Saturday show on WNCX, Spero left M105-FM and spent over ten years with Columbia Pictures. In March 1984, Boxoffice magazine listed in its "On the Move" page that Spero was promoted to Manager of the Cleveland-Cincinnati branch office. He continued to work up through the ranks and was Columbia's Regional Managing Director in Independence, Ohio, when the film company relocated that office to Chicago.

== Joe Walsh ==
Returning to talent management, Spero became Joe Walsh's manager just before Walsh released his ninth studio album Ordinary Average Guy (1991). Spero and Walsh have maintained a friendship for over thirty years.

Spero produced 'The Joe Walsh/Glenn Frey Tour' – the precursor to 'The Eagles: Hell Freezes Over Tour' – after facilitating the reconciliation between Walsh and Frey which eventually brought the entire band back together. He describes the Hell Freezes Over Tour as "the coolest thing I ever did."

In the late 1990s, in addition to Joe Walsh, Spero was managing other musicians including the classic pop act Raspberries and Ted Neeley, a rock and roll musician well known for performing the title role in the 1973 movie and long-running road production of Jesus Christ Superstar. He also was managing Harry Nilsson in 1994 when the Grammy award winning musician died in his sleep a few days after completing work on his album "Lost and Found".

== The Rock and Roll Hall of Fame ==
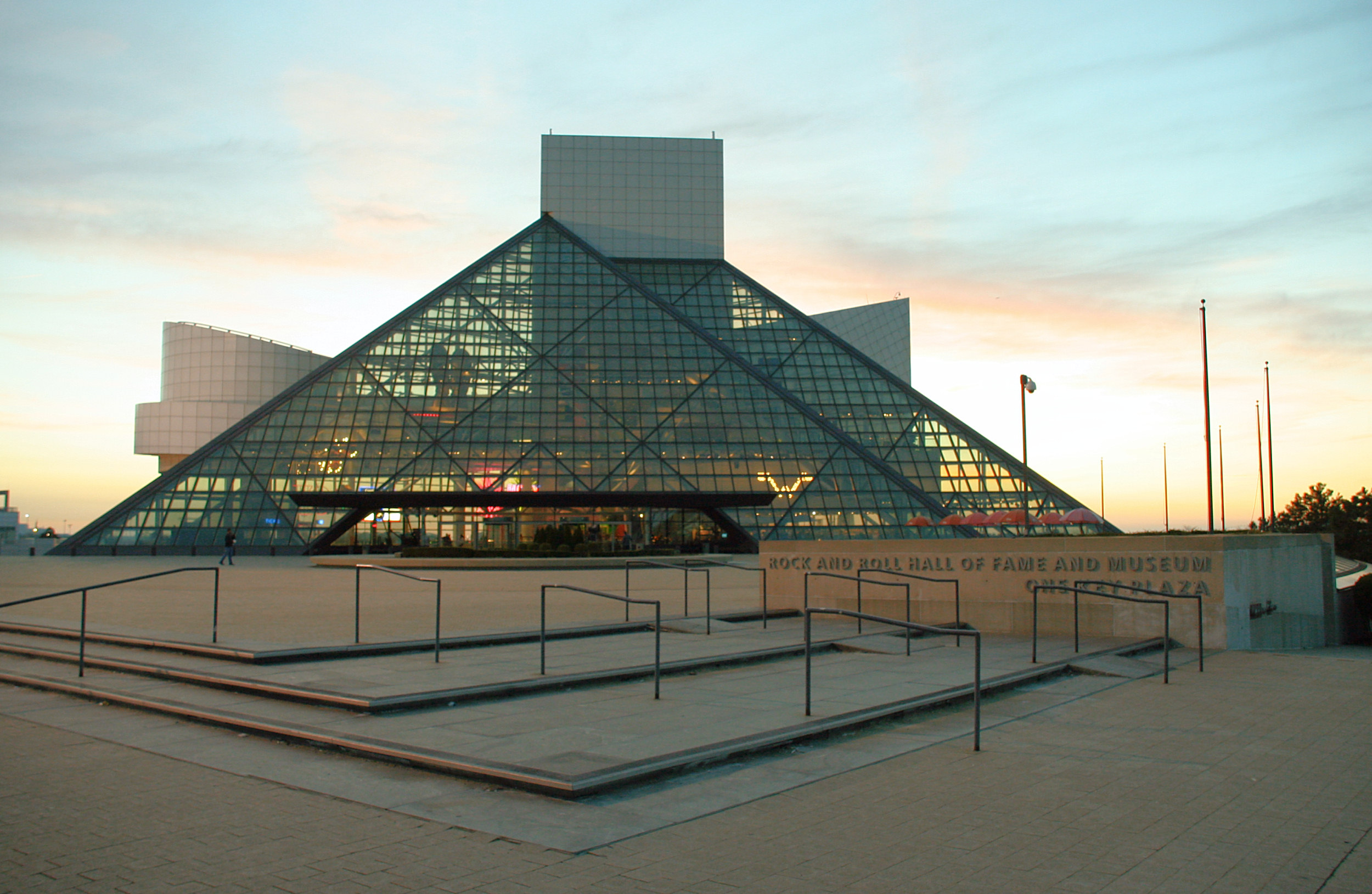
Rock and Roll Hall of Fame

In 2000, Spero accepted a position as Senior Director of Programming for The Rock and Roll Hall of Fame where he set up many shows and creative events including MTV Live At The Rock and Roll Hall of Fame. John Mayer, Linkin Park, Avril Lavigne and Godsmack are among the artists Spero brought to the Rock Hall. Spero served as a member of their Board of Trustees into 2008. Among the many events he brought to the Rock Hall, in October 2005, Spero recreated Upbeat in a benefit helping inner city teenagers.

In addition to his involvement with Cleveland's Hall of Fame, on October 7, 2007, Spero himself was inducted as one of the Radio/Television Broadcasters Hall of Fame of Ohio's Class of 2007. And when Graham Nash was inducted into the Rock and Roll Hall of Fame in 2010 for the second time, this time with The Hollies – the first time was in 1997 with Crosby, Stills and Nash – Nash acknowledged the help and support of Spero during his remarks.

== Yusuf Islam (formerly Cat Stevens) ==
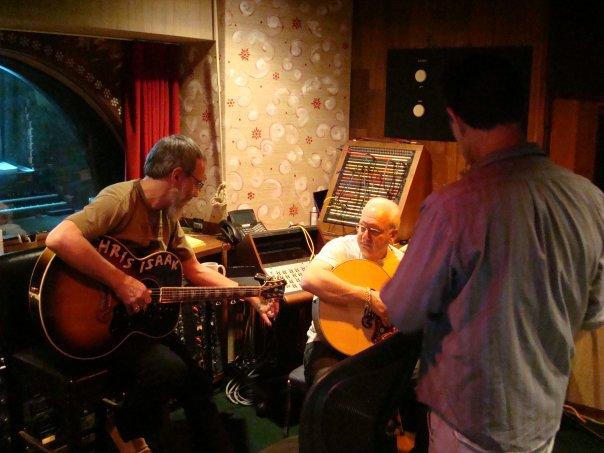
Yusuf Islam and David Spero recording in LA

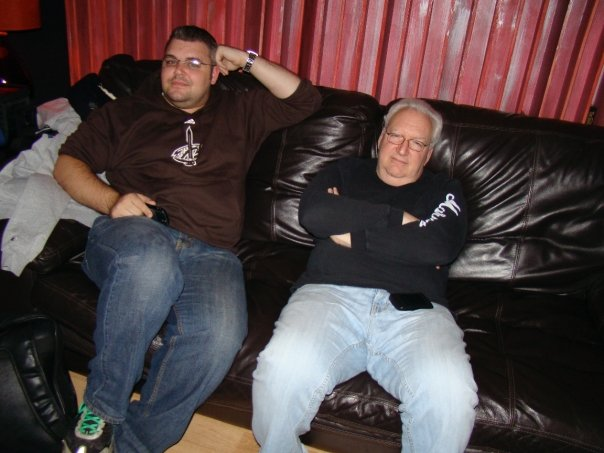
David and Adam Spero at Ante Up Studio B in 2009 recording with Josh and the Empty Pockets

In 2003, managing Billy Bob Thornton, Spero helped his Edge of the World album get off the ground with a summer tour. A few years later, in 2007, Spero was Yusuf Islam's manager, co-managing him with his brother David Gordon, for the Deluxe reissues of Tea for the Tillerman and Teaser and the Firecat. David then did the A&R work for the former Cat Stevens' Roadsinger CD and put together his tour in Europe and the US in 2009 which was Islam's first full tour since 1976.

Spero was instrumental in bringing together Paul McCartney and Islam into the recording studio for one of the tracks. That track, "Boots & Sand," also features Dolly Parton, Islam's longtime friend and collaborator.

With his son Adam working alongside him, Spero continues to manage artists from his home in South Euclid, Ohio, representing Dickey Betts, Dave Mason, The Funk Brothers and many others. Like he did in the '70s with Michael Stanley, Spero continues to work with up-and-coming artists explaining "You need to mix the old with the new to keep up the variety of interests."
