= Analog Man (album) =

Studio album by Joe Walsh
- Released: June 5, 2012
- Genres: Pop rock, soft rock
- Length: 36:32; 47:00 (Deluxe Edition)
- Label: Fantasy
- Producers: Jeff Lynne; Joe Walsh; Tim Armstrong

Joe Walsh chronology
Joe Walsh's Greatest Hits – Little Did He Know... (1997)	Analog Man (2012)	All Night Long: Live in Dallas (2013)

Singles from Analog Man
- 1. "Analog Man" Released: April 24, 2012; 2. "Lucky That Way" Released: May 15, 2012

Analog Man is the eleventh solo studio album by the American singer-songwriter and multi-instrumentalist Joe Walsh, formerly of the James Gang and lead guitarist for the Eagles. The album was released in mid 2012, on the label Fantasy in the United States and the United Kingdom, It is also his first new solo studio album to be released since 1992's Songs for a Dying Planet, 20 years prior. The album features 10 new songs, and was co-produced by Walsh, Jeff Lynne, who also performs various instruments and backing vocals on the album, and Tim Armstrong from the punk band Rancid who co-wrote and plays guitar on one of the album's songs. The album also features contributions from the former Beatles drummer, Ringo Starr, the former Barnstorm members, Kenny Passarelli and Joe Vitale, former James Gang members, Jim Fox and Dale Peters, David Crosby and Graham Nash of Crosby, Stills & Nash and also a duet with Little Richard.

The album peaked at No. 12 on the Billboard 200 chart, as well as No. 4 on the top rock albums chart. In the UK it reached No. 53, his first chart album there for 34 years.

== Production and recording ==
After touring with the Eagles and struggling with alcohol and drug addictions for many years, Walsh decided that it was time to record a new album while being supported by his wife, Marjorie Bach (sister of Ringo Starr's wife, Barbara). To pursue making the album, she also gave Walsh Jeff Lynne's contact number. When Walsh was asked about his collaboration with co-producer Jeff Lynne, he said "Jeff and I met socially, and at one point he said, "Why don't you bring your tracks over sometime and we'll have a listen." That led to some comments and ideas that he had. Gradually, we worked on some stuff and checked out some of his stuff too. It ended up that he really helped me finish it up and ended up producing. He really put his stamp on my music and took it in a direction I never would have gone, and I'm really grateful to him."

== Critical reception ==
Professional ratings
Aggregate scores
Source	Rating
Metacritic	57/100
Review scores
Source	Rating
AllMusic	3.5/5 stars
American Songwriter	2.5/5 stars
Classic Rock	6/10 stars
Drowned in Sound	6/10
Nash Country Weekly	3/5 stars
Rolling Stone	3/5 stars

The album received mixed reviews, with review aggregator Metacritic assigning an overall rating of 57/100. Reviewing the album in Rolling Stone, critic Jon Dolan wrote of the album "life's clearly been pretty good to Walsh: He's sober ("One Day at a Time"), loves his family ("Family") and still has good command of his guitar chops (check out "Funk 50," a reinvention of the James Gang's 1970 killer "Funk #49," complete with new, carefree lyrics)."

Reviewing for AllMusic, critic Stephen Thomas Erlewine wrote of the album "apart from the odd lyrical reference to an iPod or Walsh's ongoing recovery, Analog Man sounds like it could have come out in 1992 and that's all due to Lynne, a man who makes a record in one particular way: crisp, clean, hook-laden, and sequenced so tightly there's no room to breathe."

== Track listing ==
All songs written by Joe Walsh, except as noted.

No.	Title	Writer(s)	Length
1.	"Analog Man"	Joe Walsh, Drew Hester, Gannin Arnold	4:02
2.	"Wrecking Ball"	Walsh, Tommy Lee James	3:45
3.	"Lucky That Way"	Walsh, James	4:14
4.	"Spanish Dancer"		3:49
5.	"Band Played On"	Walsh, James	4:03
6.	"Family"	Walsh, James	4:21
7.	"One Day at a Time"		3:18
8.	"Hi-Roller Baby"	Tim Armstrong, Laura Pergolizzi	3:18
9.	"Funk 50"		1:57
10.	"India"		3:44
11.	"Fishbone"		3:48
12.	"But I Try"	Walsh, Jim Fox, Richard Penniman, Dale Peters	6:40

=== Vinyl LP track listing ===
All songs written by Joe Walsh, except as noted.

No.	Title	Writer(s)	Length
1.	"Analog Man"	Joe Walsh, Drew Hester, Gannin Arnold	4:02
2.	"Wrecking Ball"	Walsh, Tommy Lee James	3:45
3.	"Lucky That Way"	Walsh, James	4:14
4.	"Spanish Dancer"		3:49
5.	"Funk 50"		1:57
6.	"Band Played On"	Walsh, James	4:03
7.	"Family"	Walsh, James	4:21
8.	"One Day at a Time"		3:18
9.	"Hi-Roller Baby"	Tim Armstrong, Laura Pergolizzi	3:18
10.	"India"		3:44

== Personnel ==
- Joe Walsh – guitars, lead vocals (1–4, 6–8, 11), vocals (5, 9), bass (5, 7, 10), drums (5), acoustic piano (7), string arrangements (7), synthesizers (10), backing vocals (12)
- Jeff Lynne – keyboards (1, 2), guitars (1, 2, 8), bass (1, 2, 4, 8), drums (1, 2, 4, 8), backing vocals (2, 4, 8)
- Bruce Sugar – organ (3), percussion programming (6), programming (10, 11)
- Joe Vitale – keyboards (6), sitar (6)
- Richard Davis – synthesizers (7), programming (7)
- Little Richard – acoustic piano (12), lead vocals (12)
- Greg Leisz – pedal steel guitar (3)
- Jay Dee Maness – pedal steel guitar (3)
- Tim Armstrong – guitars (8)
- Rick Rosas – bass (3)
- Kenny Passarelli – bass (6)
- Dale Peters – bass (12)
- Ringo Starr – drums (3, 6)
- Jim Fox – drums (12), backing vocals (12)
- Steve Jay – percussion (1, 2, 4)
- Tommy Lee James – backing vocals (3, 6)
- David Crosby – backing vocals (7)
- Graham Nash – backing vocals (7)

== Production ==
- Jeff Lynne – producer, mixing (1, 2, 4, 8, 11)
- Joe Walsh – producer (3, 5–7, 9, 10, 12)
- Tim Armstrong – producer (9)
- Steve Jay – engineer (1, 2, 4, 8)
- Bruce Sugar – engineer (3, 5–7, 9, 10), mixing (3, 5–7, 9, 10, 12)
- John Morrical – engineer (9)
- Ken Hammon – engineer (12)
- Dan Gerbarg – mastering
- Howie Weinberg – mastering
- Jeri Heiden – art direction
- Ryan Corey – package design, background photography
- Andrew MacPherson – photography
- Irving Azoff – manager for Azoff Management (Los Angeles, CA)

== Charts ==
Chart (2012)	Peak position
Belgian Albums (Ultratop Flanders)	123
Belgian Albums (Ultratop Wallonia)	120
Dutch Albums (Album Top 100)	62
German Albums (Offizielle Top 100)	73
Scottish Albums (Official Charts)	38
UK Albums (Official Charts)	53
US Billboard 200	12
US Top Rock Albums (Billboard)	4

== See also ==
- List of 2012 albums
- Joe Walsh discography
