= The Confessor (song) =

Single by Joe Walsh

from the album The Confessor
- Released: 1985
- Genre: Hard rock; progressive rock
- Length: 7:06
- Label: Full Moon
- Songwriter: Joe Walsh
- Producers: Keith Olsen; Joe Walsh

Joe Walsh singles chronology
"I Can Play That Rock & Roll" (1983)	"The Confessor" (1985)	"The Radio Song" (1987)

Music video
- "The Confessor" on YouTube

"The Confessor" is a song by American rock musician Joe Walsh that appeared on his 1985 album of the same name. It is the longest song on the album clocking in at 7 minutes and 6 seconds, and it has two segments. The first segment is a slow acoustic intro, and Joe Walsh sings an introductory verse before the second segment, which is hard rock. After the slow introduction, the drums kick in, and Walsh sings a couple more verses before the instrumental bridge section, where he plays his solos and riffs. Although the song failed to chart on the Billboard Hot 100, it did manage to reach #8 on the Hot Mainstream Rock Tracks chart.

When Walsh toured Australia and the US, the song was on the set list.
