= George "Chocolate" Perry =

American songwriter

- Also known as: "Chocolate Perry"
- Born: George Wesly Perry; 1953 (age 72–73)
- Origin: Carver Ranches, West Park, Florida, United States
- Genres: Soul; R&B; Rock
- Occupations: Musician; record producer; recording engineer; mixing engineer
- Instrument: Bass guitar
- Years active: 1974–1993
- Label: TK

George Wesly Perry (born 1953), known professionally as "Chocolate Perry" is an American bassist, songwriter and producer. Perry has worked with the Bee Gees, John Cougar, Jon Secada, Stephen Stills, Crosby, Stills, Nash & Young, Al Kooper, Dion DiMucci, Joe Walsh, Joe Vitale, Ivano Fossati and many more.

== Early life and career ==
Perry was born and raised in Carver Ranches, West Park, Florida.

He started his career in the 1970s at the leading soul and disco independent TK Records, run by entrepreneur/ record distributor, Henry Stone in Hialeah, Florida. He played bass on many of the records issued by the company before its demise in 1980. He later went out on the road, performing with some of the biggest rock and pop artists of the time.

At school, he heard Miami singer, Latimore on the radio and decided to become a musician. He started to hang out at the TK studio and label owners, Steve Alaimo and Henry Stone eventually gave him a key to the company's recording studio and his own office. He helped to write and produce Gwen McCrae's #1 R&B hit, "Rockin' Chair" when he was only in his teens in 1975. He says he learned friendship, family skills, and how to play all kinds of different music at TK.

Perry was brought in to play on a recording session with Stephen Stills in Miami and was then invited to join the singer's regular band. That led to years of touring with a series of major acts, including The Bee Gees, before he decided to retire in 1993, due to long-standing problems with agoraphobia.

== Albums produced ==
- Raw Soul Express – Raw Soul Express (1976)
- The Blue Notes – The Truth Has Come to Light (1977)
- King Sporty – Mr. Rhythm (1977)
- Chocolateclay – Chocolateclay (1977)
- Bobby Caldwell – Bobby Caldwell (track "Can't Say Goodbye") (1978)
- Joe Walsh – There Goes the Neighborhood (1981)
- Joe Walsh – You Bought It – You Name It (1983)
