= In My Car (Ringo Starr song) =

Single by Ringo Starr

from the album Old Wave
- B-side: "As Far as We Can Go"
- Released: 16 June 1983 (Germany, Austria, and Switzerland only); 1 November 1994 (Reissue)
- Genre: Rock; pop rock
- Length: 3:13
- Label: Bellaphon – 100-16-012
- Songwriter(s): Joe Walsh; Richard Starkey; Mo Foster; Kim Goody
- Producer(s): Joe Walsh

"In My Car" is a single by the Beatles' former drummer, Ringo Starr. The track is credited as being written by Mo Foster, Kim Goody, Richard Starkey, and Joe Walsh. The track was included on Starr's ninth solo studio album, Old Wave, which was produced by the Eagles' lead guitarist, Joe Walsh in 1983.

The single was re-released, this time on yellow vinyl for jukeboxes only, with "She's About a Mover" as the B-side, on the label The Right Stuff on 1 November 1994, 11 years after the first release.

== Personnel ==
- Ringo Starr – lead vocals; drums; percussion
- Joe Walsh – lead guitar; backing vocals
- Mo Foster – bass guitar
- Chris Stainton – keyboards
- Gary Brooker – keyboards
- Mark Easterling – backing vocals
- Steve Hess – backing vocals
- Patrick Maroshek – backing vocals

== Cover version ==
In 1987, Joe Walsh, the single's producer and co-songwriter, recorded a cover version for his eighth solo studio album Got Any Gum?, which was released as a single and became a moderate hit.
