= All Night Long (Joe Walsh song) =

1980 single by Joe Walsh

Single by Joe Walsh

from the album Urban Cowboy: Original Motion Picture Soundtrack
- B-side: "Orange Blossom Special/Hoedown"
- Released: May 1980
- Genre: Hard rock
- Length: 3:50 (Album version); 3:32 (Single version)
- Label: Full Moon
- Songwriter: Joe Walsh
- Producer: Joe Walsh

Joe Walsh singles chronology
"Life's Been Good" (1978)	"All Night Long" (1980)	"A Life of Illusion" (1981)

"All Night Long" is a song by Joe Walsh, the guitarist for the Eagles. It became one of Walsh's best charting singles. A live version of the song was included on the album Eagles Live (1980). It also appears in the soundtrack to the film Urban Cowboy (1980).

== Critical reception ==
Billboard described the work of Joe Walsh as a "wailing through the rocker that has a subtle country rock flavor", praised the guitar and a vocal performance. Cashbox said that Walsh plays "red hot guitar" and there is "plenty of power packed into the gut-grabbing chording."

== Background ==
Unlike the other tracks on the film's soundtrack, it does not have much to do with country music—despite its reference to chewing tobacco: "Keep a-grinning 'til the weekend comes / Just a pinch between your cheek and gum."

== Chart performance ==
One month before the film Urban Cowboy on May 11, the single entered the Billboard Hot 100 chart at the position #74; and on July 20 it peaked at #19 (for 2 weeks) and spent 16 weeks on the Hot 100, making it one of Walsh's highest-charting solo singles. On the Canadian pop singles chart, it reached #13 for three weeks.

=== Weekly charts ===
Chart (1980)	Peak position
Canada RPM	13
U.S. Billboard Hot 100	19
U.S. Cashbox Top 100	18

=== Year-end charts ===
Chart (1980)	Rank
U.S. Billboard	99

== Personnel ==
- Joe Walsh – lead vocals, guitars
- George "Chocolate" Perry – bass guitar
- Paul Harris – keyboards
- Joe Vitale – drums
