= A Life of Illusion =

Single by Joe Walsh

from the album There Goes the Neighborhood
- B-side: "Rockets"
- Released: May 1981
- Recorded: 1973
- Genre: Rock
- Length: 3:30
- Label: Asylum
- Songwriters: Joe Walsh; Kenny Passarelli
- Producer: Joe Walsh

Joe Walsh singles chronology
"All Night Long" (1980)	"A Life of Illusion" (1981)	"Rivers (Of the Hidden Funk)" (1981)

Audio
- "A Life of Illusion" on YouTube

"A Life of Illusion" is a song written by the American singer-songwriter and multi-instrumentalist Joe Walsh and guitarist Kenny Passarelli, which became a hit and one of Walsh's most recognizable songs. It appears as the fifth track on Walsh's fifth solo studio album, There Goes the Neighborhood (1981). The majority of the track was originally recorded in 1973 as part of The Smoker You Drink, the Player You Get sessions.

== Release ==
The song was a hit in the United States, peaking at #34 on the Billboard Hot 100, and also reaching #1 on the magazine's Top Tracks chart, where his former bandmates Don Henley and Glenn Frey would also score #1 hits.

== Critical reception ==
Record World said that "Walsh's existential lyrics wind into a great hook." Record World also praised Passarelli's guitarrón playing on the song.

== Charts ==
Chart (1981)	Peak position
Canada RPM Top Singles	37
U.S. Billboard Hot 100	34
U.S. Billboard Mainstream Rock	1
U.S. Cash Box Top 100	35

== Cover versions ==
In 2002, the Foo Fighters recorded a cover version of the song as the B-side to their single "Times Like These", which later appeared on their covers album Medium Rare (2011).

== In popular culture ==
The song is used as the musical background to the opening scene in the film The 40-Year-Old Virgin (2005), and appears as the first track on the soundtrack album. It is also featured early in an Apple TV+ 2023 documentary about Michael J. Fox. The song is likewise referenced in author Rick Riordan's The Burning Maze (2018), the third book in The Trials of Apollo series.

== See also ==
- List of Billboard Mainstream Rock number-one songs of the 1980s
