= Life's Been Good =

1978 single by Joe Walsh

Single by Joe Walsh

from the album But Seriously, Folks... and FM: The Original Movie Soundtrack
- B-side: "Theme from Boat Weirdos"
- Released: May 1978
- Recorded: 1978
- Genre: Hard rock; blues rock; reggae rock
- Length: 8:56 (album version w/ hidden track); 8:04 (album version w/o hidden track); 4:35 (single version)
- Label: Asylum; MCA
- Songwriter: Joe Walsh
- Producers: Joe Walsh; Bill Szymczyk

Joe Walsh singles chronology
| "Rocky Mountain Way" (1977) | "Life's Been Good" (1978) | "All Night Long" (1980) |

Audio
- "Life's Been Good" on YouTube

"Life's Been Good" is a song by American singer-songwriter and multi-instrumentalist Joe Walsh that first appeared on the soundtrack to the comedy drama film FM (1978). The original eight-minute version was released on Walsh's fourth studio album But Seriously, Folks... (1978), and an edited four-minute single version peaked at No. 12 on the US Billboard Hot 100, remaining his biggest solo hit.

In the song, Walsh satirically reflects on the antics and excesses of the era's rock stars, with nods to drummer Keith Moon of the Who and others: "I live in hotels, tear out the walls/I have accountants pay for it all", and "My Maserati does one-eighty-five/I lost my license, now I don't drive", based on his own experience.

The 1979 Rolling Stone Record Guide called it "riotous", and "(maybe) the most important statement on rock stardom anyone has made in the late Seventies". In June 2026, CBS News included the song in its list of the 250 essential American songs of the past 250 years.

== Content ==
"Life's Been Good" has a mid-tempo, reggae-like groove marked by bedrock guitar riffs, synthesizers, and humorous lyrics. According to Billboard, the lyrics are at least partially autobiographical. Walsh's ARP Odyssey synthesizer riff accompanies the lead guitar in the middle of the song. The lead guitar in the outro is accompanied by the main riff. Bill Szymczyk and Jody Boyer perform the backing vocals.

The pre-chorus section on the second and third verses uses a call and response pattern.

Joe Walsh: "Lucky I'm sane after all I've been through"
Call: Bill Szymczyk: "Everybody say I'm cool"
Response: Jody Boyer: "He's cool"

Joe Walsh: "They say I'm lazy but it takes all my time"
Call: Bill Szymczyk: "Everybody say, "Oh, yeah""
Response: Jody Boyer: "Oh, yeah!"

Record World said that the song "blends [Walsh's] signature guitar work with a touch of reggae" and that "the lyrics touch on a number of topics, all treated with a light irony."

At the end of the LP, there is a clip of an in-joke stating "uh-oh, here comes a flock of wah wahs", recorded from inside the studio. After the music has faded away into silence, there's a 10-second gap before the inside joke. That inside joke would also be included at the end of disc one of the Eagles' compilation box set, Selected Works: 1972–1999 (2000).

Made after Walsh had joined the Eagles, "Life's Been Good" was incorporated into that band's concert repertoire, appearing in shows at the time as well as reunion tours. It remains a staple of classic rock radio playlists. A live version of the song with the Eagles appears on the live album Eagles Live (1980), where some of the lyrics are changed.

== Inspiration ==
In a 2012 concert at the Troubadour in West Hollywood, California, Walsh explained that the song's lyrics were largely true. He purchased a home in Santa Barbara, California, shortly before he joined the Eagles, then spent the next two years touring or recording and mostly living in hotels. He preferred a suite: if a hotel did not have one available, he would rent two adjacent rooms, "tearing out a wall" to create one. He owned a Maserati and did often ride in limousines. His driving license was lost, not because it was confiscated but because he lost his wallet while it was inside. He had an office he never visited with gold records on the wall and an answering machine. Walsh often stayed late at parties. Once, when he attempted to leave in the early morning hours, instead of finding the front door, he walked into a closet by mistake.

== Personnel ==
Sourced from Mixonline

- Joe Walsh – lead and backing vocals, electric and acoustic lead and rhythm guitars, ARP Odyssey
- Jay Ferguson – Hammond organ
- Joe Vitale – backing vocals, ARP Odyssey, grand piano, drums, percussion
- Joey Murcia – electric rhythm guitar
- Willie Weeks – bass guitar
- Bill Szymczyk – backing vocals
- Jody Boyer – backing vocals

== Chart performance ==
=== Weekly charts ===
| Chart (1978) | Peak position |
|---|---|
| Australia (Kent Music Report) | 56 |
| US Billboard Hot 100 | 12 |
| US Cash Box Top 100 | 6 |
| Canadian RPM Top Singles | 11 |
| Irish Singles Chart | 13 |
| New Zealand Singles Chart | 32 |
| UK singles chart | 14 |

=== Year-end charts ===
| Chart (1978) | Rank |
|---|---|
| Canada (RPM Top 200 Singles) | 94 |
| US Billboard Hot 100 | 87 |
| US Cash Box | 72 |

== Certifications ==
| Region | Certification | Certified units/sales |
|---|---|---|
| New Zealand (RMNZ) | Platinum | 30,000^{‡} |
^{‡} Sales+streaming figures based on certification alone.
