= Joe Walsh =

American rock musician (born 1947)

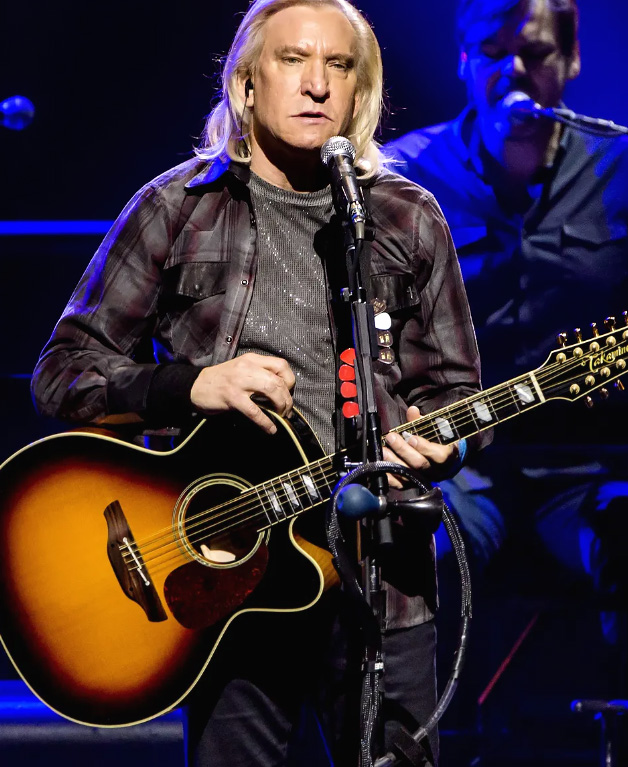
- Walsh performing with Eagles at Madison Square Garden in 2019

Background information
- Also known as: "Clown Prince of Rock" "Average Joe"
- Born: Joseph Fidler; November 20, 1947 (age 79); Wichita, Kansas, U.S.
- Genres: Hard rock; blues rock; pop rock; progressive rock; country rock
- Occupations: Musician; songwriter
- Instruments: Guitar; keyboards; vocals
- Works: Solo; with the Eagles
- Years active: 1965–present
- Labels: Asylum; Epic; ABC; Dunhill; Probe; Warner Bros.; Full Moon; Atlantic; MCA; Fantasy; The Orchard
- Member of: Eagles
- Formerly of: James Gang; Barnstorm; Ringo Starr & His All-Starr Band
- Spouses: Margie Walsh (m. 1967; div. 1970); Stephanie Walsh (m. 1971; div. 1978); Juanita Boyer (m. 1980; div. 1988); Denise Driscoll (m. 1999; div. 2006); Marjorie Bach (m. 2008)
- Partner: Stevie Nicks (1983–1986)
- Website: joewalsh.com

Joseph Fidler Walsh (born Joseph Woodward Fidler; November 20, 1947) is an American guitarist, singer, and songwriter. Best known as a member of the rock band Eagles, his six-decade career includes solo work and stints in other bands: the James Gang, Ringo Starr & His All-Starr Band, and New Zealand's Herbs. He had success as a solo artist and prolific session musician, appearing on other artists' recordings. In 2011, Rolling Stone ranked him No. 54 on its list of "100 Greatest Guitarists of All Time".

In the mid-1960s, after attending Kent State University, Walsh played with several local Ohio bands before reaching national fame with the James Gang, whose hit "Funk 49" showcased his skills. Roger Abramson signed the James Gang to BPI in Cleveland. After leaving the James Gang in 1972, Walsh formed Barnstorm with Joe Vitale and Kenny Passarelli. Though the band produced three albums, their work was marketed as Walsh solo projects. The last Barnstorm album, So What (1974), featured significant contributions from Eagles members.

At producer Bill Szymczyk's suggestion, Walsh joined Eagles in 1975 as guitarist and keyboardist, replacing founding member Bernie Leadon. His first album with them was Hotel California. In 1998, a Guitarist magazine reader's poll named the solos by Walsh and Don Felder on "Hotel California" the best guitar solos ever. Guitar World ranked it eighth in the Top 100 Guitar Solos. As a member of Eagles, Walsh was inducted into the Rock and Roll Hall of Fame in 1998, and the Vocal Group Hall of Fame in 2001. Eagles is one of the most influential bands of the 1970s and remain one of the best-selling American bands in history. Walsh's contributions to music have been praised by Jimmy Page, Eric Clapton, and Pete Townshend.

Walsh has released 12 solo studio albums, six compilation albums, and two live albums. His solo hits include "Rocky Mountain Way," "Life's Been Good," "All Night Long," "A Life of Illusion," and "Ordinary Average Guy."

== Early life and education ==
Walsh was born on November 20, 1947, in Wichita, Kansas. His father, Lt. Robert Newton Fidler, was a pilot in the United States Air Force, who died in a mid-air collision while flying a Lockheed F-80 Shooting Star during maneuvers over Okinawa on July 22, 1949. Walsh's mother, Helen, was a classically trained pianist of Scottish and German ancestry.

Walsh was adopted by his stepfather at age five and given his stepfather's surname, but retained Fidler as his middle name. In the 1950s, it was common practice for children to take the name of their stepfather for Social Security, school registration, and health records. Walsh and his family lived in Columbus, Ohio, for a number of years during his youth. When he was twelve, his family moved to New York City. Later, Walsh moved to Montclair, New Jersey, and attended Montclair High School, where he played oboe in the school band. Walsh played tight end briefly for the high school football team before being injured. In his late teens he would often take the bus to Manhattan and stand outside the Bitter End club and listen to the Lovin' Spoonful, being too young to be allowed in. Similarly, he would stand outside the Peppermint Lounge in order to hear Joey Dee and the Starliters.

Walsh acquired his first guitar at the age of 10, and upon learning the Ventures' 1960 hit recording of "Walk Don't Run", decided that he wanted to pursue a career as a guitarist. Inspired by the success of the Beatles, he replaced Bruce Hoffman as the bass player in the locally popular group the Nomads in Madison, New Jersey, beginning his career as a rock musician.

After high school, Walsh briefly attended Kent State University, where he spent time in various bands playing around the Cleveland, Ohio, area, including the Measles. The Measles recorded for Super K Productions' Ohio Express the songs "I Find I Think of You", "And It's True", and "Maybe" (an instrumental version of "And It's True"). He planned to major in English and minor in music. Walsh has also stated he was present during the Kent State massacre in 1970. Walsh commented in 2012: "Being at the shootings really affected me profoundly. I decided that maybe I don't need a degree that bad." After one term, he dropped out of college to pursue his musical career.

== Musical career ==
=== 1965–1967: The Measles ===
Walsh and three other Kent State University students formed The Measles, a garage bar band, in 1965. Two tracks on Ohio Express's Beg Borrow and Steal album, "I Find I Think Of You" and "And It's True", were actually recorded by the Measles, led by Walsh who also provided the vocals. Additionally, an instrumental version of "And It's True" was recorded by the Measles, re-titled "Maybe" and released as the B-side of the "Beg Borrow and Steal" single.

=== 1968–1971: James Gang ===
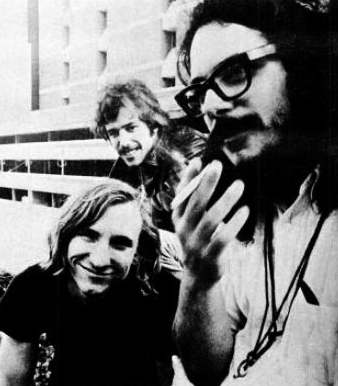
Walsh (left) with the James Gang, 1970

Around Christmas 1967, James Gang guitarist Glenn Schwartz, who turned out to be AWOL from the army and was breaking up with his wife, decided to leave the band to move to California, where he ended up forming the band Pacific Gas & Electric. Days later, Walsh, a friend of Schwartz's, knocked on Jim Fox's door and asked to be given a tryout as Schwartz's replacement. Walsh was accepted and the band continued as a five-piece for a short time until Phil Giallombardo, who was still in high school at the time, left. Bill Jeric and Walsh worked together on guitar parts, but Jeric left as well in the spring of 1968. He was replaced by a returning Ronnie Silverman, who had been discharged from the military.

In May 1968, the group played a concert in Detroit at the Grande Ballroom, opening for Cream. At the last minute, Silverman told the others that he would not join them at the show. The band, desperately in need of the money, took to the stage as a trio. They liked their sound as a threesome and decided to remain that way.

In 1968, the band signed with manager Mark Barger, who was handling the career of fellow Ohio outfit the Lemon Pipers, who had just scored a big hit with "Green Tambourine." Barger put the Gang in touch with ABC Records staff producer Bill Szymczyk, who signed them to ABC's new Bluesway Records subsidiary in January 1969.

They released their debut album, Yer' Album, in 1969. In November 1969, bassist Tom Kriss decided he was no longer into the music and left to be replaced by Dale Peters, who was brought in from a group called the Case of E.T. Hooley. In an interview, Jim Fox recounted a band meeting where Kriss told Walsh and Fox, "I hate this band. I hate the music we're making. I don't think I can play it anymore." The addition of Peters created the most successful incarnation of the James Gang. Walsh proved to be the band's star attraction, noted for his innovative rhythm playing and creative guitar riffs. In particular he was known for hot-wiring the pickups on his electric guitars to create his trademark "attack" sound. The James Gang had several minor hits and became an early album-oriented rock staple for the next two years. It was during 1969 that Walsh sold his Les Paul guitar to Jimmy Page for "about $1,200". Later in 1969, the group's record producer, Szymczyk, arranged for the band to appear in the "electric Western" film Zachariah, with two James Gang songs, "Laguna Salada" and "Country Fever", also being used. For the recording of these two songs, vocalist Kenny Weiss was brought in to allow Walsh to focus on his guitar playing; he was gone by the time the group arrived in Mexico to shoot their movie scenes. "Laguna Salada" and "Country Fever" later reappeared as bonus tracks on the 2000 re-release of The James Gang Greatest Hits.

Shortly before the release of their second album James Gang Rides Again, they opened a show for the Who in Pittsburgh, Pennsylvania. Who guitarist Pete Townshend met with James Gang before they left, impressed enough to invite them on the Who's subsequent European tour. When Walsh was asked about it, he said, "Pete's a very melodic player and so am I. He told me that he appreciated my playing. I was flattered beyond belief because I didn't think I was that good."

The James Gang's next two albums, James Gang Rides Again (1970) and Thirds (1971), produced such classics as "Funk 49" and "Walk Away". The album James Gang Live at Carnegie Hall was Walsh's last album with them, as he became dissatisfied with the band's limitations.

The two remaining members, Peters and Fox, carried on with lead vocalist Roy Kenner and guitarist Domenic Troiano (both ex-members of two Canadian bands, Bush & Mandala, who gained fame with "Love-Itis" a single from the band's only album, 'Soul Crusade') for two albums, Straight Shooter and Passin' Thru, both released in 1972. But in recent interviews, Fox stated that things did not work out musically with Troiano as hoped, so Troiano left the band in 1973 and later, in late 1974, joined the Guess Who. Guitarist Tommy Bolin was then brought into the band, after being recommended by Walsh.

=== 1971–1975: Barnstorm ===
In December 1971, after Walsh left the James Gang, Steve Marriott, frontman guitarist of Humble Pie, invited Walsh to move to England and join his band after Peter Frampton had departed, but Walsh declined. Instead he moved to Colorado and formed a band called Barnstorm, with drummer and multi-instrumentalist Joe Vitale, and bassist Kenny Passarelli, although both of their albums credited Walsh as a solo artist. They started recording their debut album immediately after forming, but at the time there were only Walsh and Vitale on these sessions. Chuck Rainey did the first bass tracks on the album but these were soon replaced by Passarelli. Walsh and Barnstorm released their debut album, Barnstorm, in October 1972. After taking a cue from Townshend, Walsh utilized the ARP Odyssey synthesizer to great effect on such songs as "Mother Says" and "Here We Go". Walsh also experimented with acoustic guitar, slide guitar, effects pedals, fuzzbox, talk box, and keyboards as well as running his guitar straight into a Leslie speaker 122 to get swirly, organ-like guitar tones. The album was a critical success, but had only moderate commercial success. The follow-up, The Smoker You Drink, the Player You Get, released in June 1973, was marketed under Walsh's name (although officially a Barnstorm album) and was their commercial breakthrough. It peaked at No. 6 on the US Billboard chart. The first and leading single, "Rocky Mountain Way", received heavy airplay and reached No. 23 on the US Top 40 chart. It featured a new member, keyboardist Rocke Grace, and Walsh shared the vocals and songwriting with the other three members of the band. As a result, a variety of styles are explored on this album. There are elements of blues, jazz, folk, pop, and Caribbean music. In 1974, Barnstorm disbanded and Walsh continued as a solo artist.

In late 1974, Walsh played slide guitar on Vitale's debut solo album Roller Coaster Weekend. Walsh was taught the slide technique by Duane Allman, co-founder of the Allman Brothers Band with his brother Gregg, who had done a standout turn on Eric Clapton's 1970 Layla and Other Assorted Love Songs double-album as a drop-in contributor to Derek and the Dominos.

Barnstorm's last tour was in the spring of 1975, shortly after Walsh joined the Eagles.

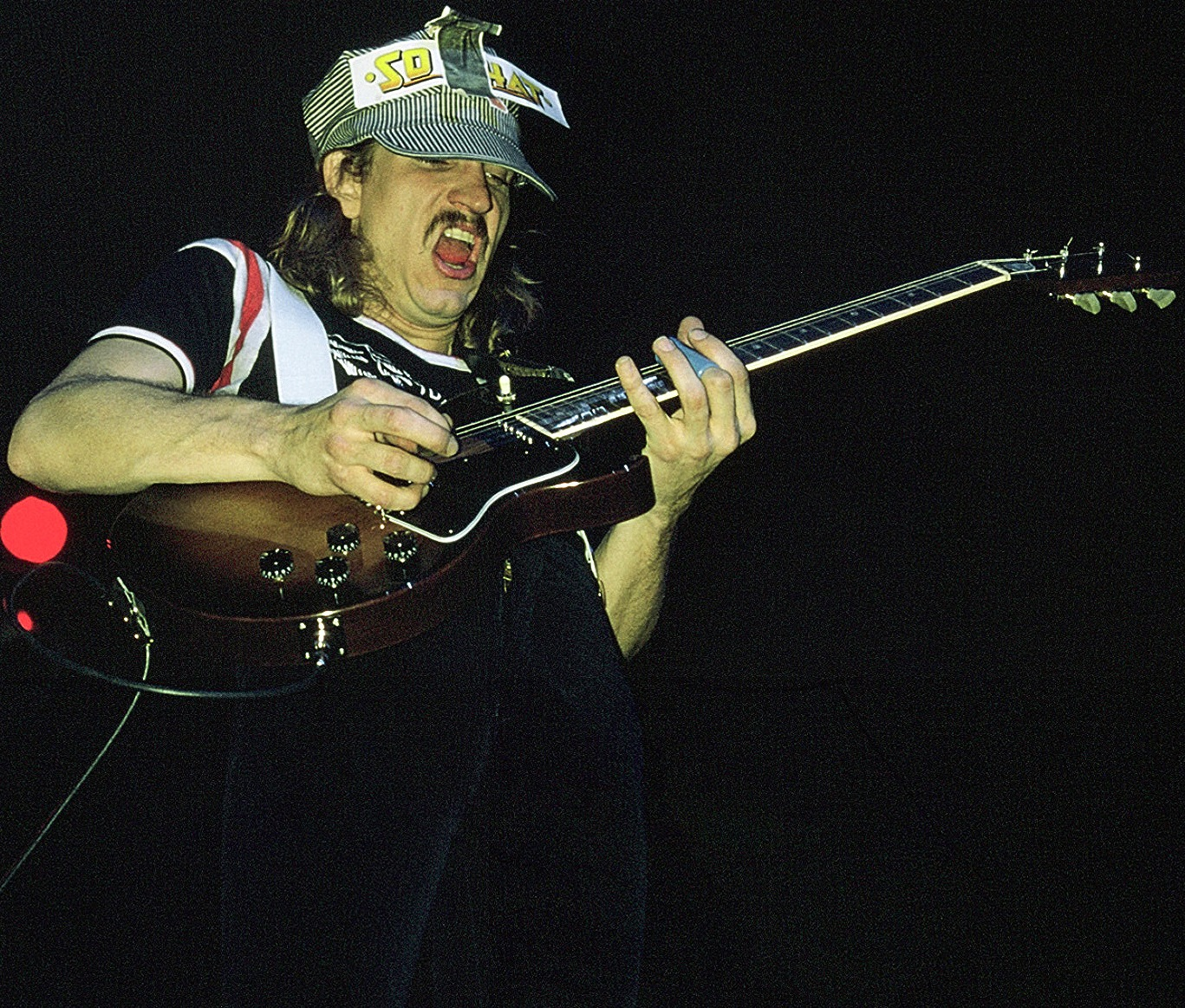
Walsh playing slide guitar with a Gibson Les Paul Special, 1975

=== 1975–1980: Eagles ===
In 1975, Walsh was invited to join the Eagles as founding member Bernie Leadon's replacement. There was some initial concern as to Walsh's ability to fit in with the band, as he was considered far too "wild" for the band's sound, especially by their drummer and co-lead vocalist, Don Henley.

Released on December 8, 1976, Hotel California was the band's fifth studio album and the first to feature Walsh. The album took a year and a half to complete, a process which, along with touring, drained the band.

The second single from the album was the title track, "Hotel California", which topped the charts in May 1977 and became one of the Eagles' signature songs next to "Take It Easy" and "Desperado". It features Henley on lead vocals, with a guitar duet performed by Felder and Walsh.

The hard rock "Life in the Fast Lane", released on May 3, 1977, was based on a riff by Walsh. It reached No. 11 on the charts and helped establish Walsh's position in the band.

Hotel California was the last album to feature founding member Randy Meisner, who abruptly left the band after the 1977 tour. He was replaced by Timothy B. Schmit, who had also succeeded him in Poco.

In 1977, the band, minus Don Felder, performed instrumental work and backing vocals for Randy Newman's album Little Criminals, including "Short People", which has backing vocals by Frey and Schmit.

The Eagles went into the recording studio in 1977 to begin work on their next album, The Long Run, which was not completed and released until September 24, 1979. Considered a disappointment by some music critics for failing to live up to Hotel California, it nonetheless proved a huge commercial hit; topping the charts and selling 7 million copies. Three singles from it —"Heartache Tonight", the title track and "I Can't Tell You Why" - reached the Top 10, and "In the City" by Walsh also received considerable airplay. The band recorded two Christmas songs during these sessions, "Funky New Year" and "Please Come Home for Christmas", which was released as a single in 1978 and reached No. 18 on the charts. The band broke up in 1980.

=== 1973–present: solo career ===
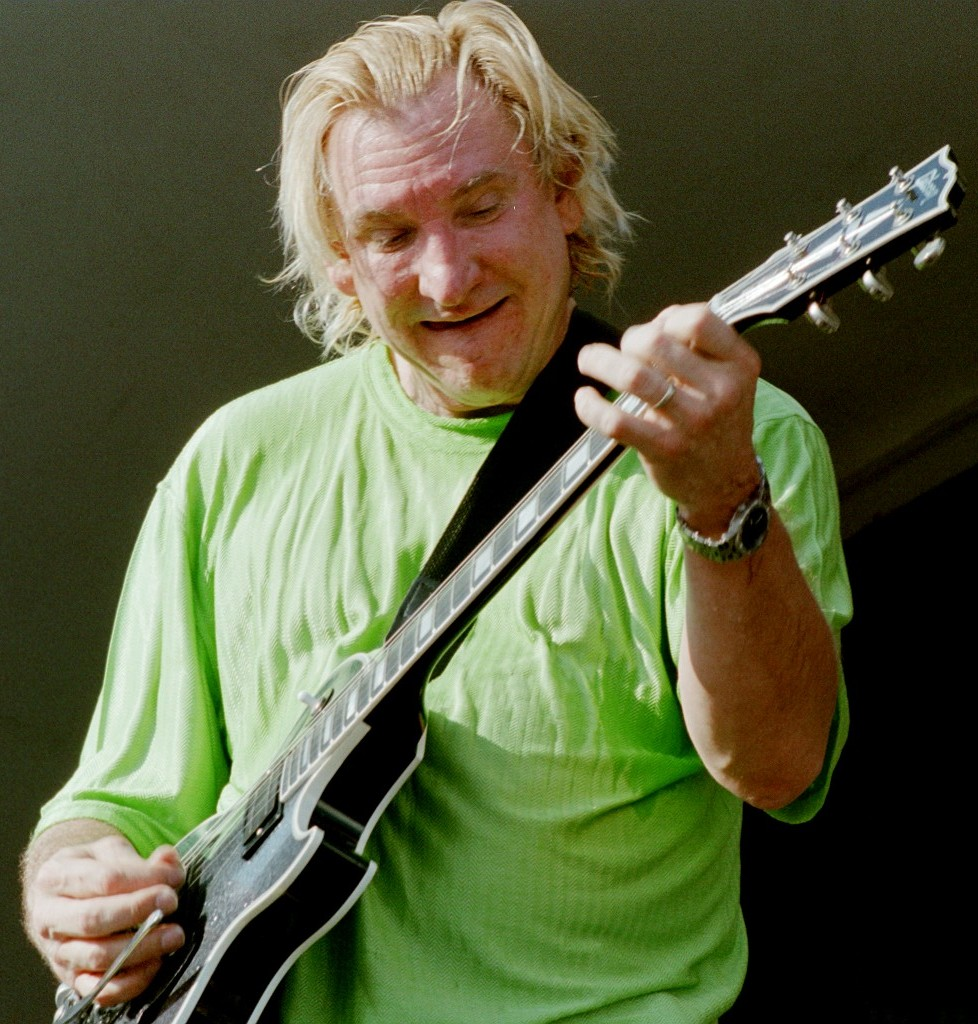
Walsh performing live at Gulfstream Park in Hallandale Beach, Florida, September 2006

Walsh has released eleven solo studio albums to date.

In December 1974, Walsh released his first album that was not considered a Barnstorm project, So What, which contained more introspective material such as "Help Me Through the Night" and "Song for Emma", a tribute to Walsh's daughter who had been killed in a car accident that April. On a few tracks, Don Henley, Glenn Frey and Randy Meisner of the Eagles contributed backing vocals.

In March 1976, Walsh released a live album, You Can't Argue with a Sick Mind, which also featured the Eagles.

As the Eagles struggled to record their follow-up to Hotel California, Walsh re-ignited his solo career with the critically well-received album, But Seriously, Folks... in May 1978. It contained the single "Life's Been Good", his comedic depiction of rock stardom, which peaked at No. 12 on the Billboard Hot 100 and remains to date his biggest solo hit. Walsh also contributed "In the City" to The Warriors soundtrack in 1979, a song penned and sung by Walsh that was later rerecorded for the Eagles' studio album, The Long Run.

Following the breakup of the Eagles in July 1980, Walsh continued to release solo albums throughout the 1980s, but sales did not match his earlier success.

There Goes the Neighborhood was Walsh's first album since the demise of the Eagles, peaking at No. 20 on the Billboard 200. It spawned a lone single, "A Life of Illusion", which topped the Hot Mainstream Rock Tracks chart in 1981 and became one of Walsh's most popular songs.

"A Life of Illusion" was recorded in 1973 with Walsh's first solo band Barnstorm but was not completed. The overdubs and final mixes were completed during the There Goes the Neighborhood sessions and released on the album. The promotional video for the track shows the making of the album's cover. This song also appeared in the opening credits of The 40-Year-Old Virgin and appears as the first song on its soundtrack.

In May 1983, Walsh released You Bought It – You Name It; the album was received negatively by the majority of music critics, though others found some good points. It was also not as successful as Walsh's previous albums, peaking at No. 48 on the Billboard 200. Walsh found moderate success with the single "Space Age Whiz Kids", about the pinnacle of the 1980s video arcade craze. The album contains hard rock songs such as "I Can Play That Rock & Roll" and a cover of the Dick Haymes track, "Love Letters". It also contains more introspective material such as "Class of '65", and contains a song titled "I.L.B.T.s", an acronym for "I Like Big Tits".

Walsh's new girlfriend, former Fleetwood Mac front singer Stevie Nicks, was involved in his next album, The Confessor. Her old friend Keith Olsen was hired to produce the album, and numerous prolific Los Angeles session musicians, including Jim Keltner, Mike Porcaro, Jeff Porcaro, Waddy Wachtel, Randy Newman, and Alan Pasqua, appeared, along with many other musicians with whom Walsh had never worked.

In 1987, Walsh released his final solo album of the 1980s, Got Any Gum?, which was produced by Terry Manning, and features vocal contributions from JD Souther and Survivor's lead singer Jimi Jamison. It proved a commercial disappointment.

In 1991, Ordinary Average Guy, his ninth solo studio album, and its title track single, were released on the Epic label. The album features former Beatle Ringo Starr, Jimi Jamison, and drummer Joe Vitale from Walsh's former band Barnstorm. Vitale also sings the lead vocals on the final track of the album, "School Days".

In 1992, Walsh released what appeared to be his final album, Songs for a Dying Planet, his ninth solo studio LP, also released on Epic. Keen to rebound from his last album's poor showing, Walsh enlisted his former producer Bill Szymczyk. His song "Vote for Me" was a minor success, peaking at No. 10 on the Hot Mainstream Rock Tracks chart.

Walsh's latest solo album, Analog Man, was released in June 2012. It was co-produced by Jeff Lynne, with Tommy Lee James co-writing some of its tracks. The song "One Day at a Time" details his struggles with alcohol and drug abuse earlier in his career.

=== Eagles reunions with Walsh ===
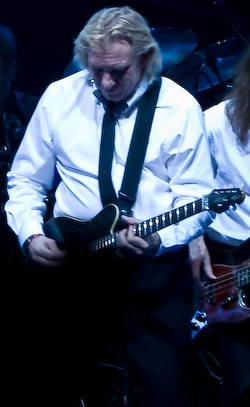
Walsh performing with the Eagles, 2008

An Eagles country tribute album titled Common Thread: The Songs of the Eagles was released in 1993, thirteen years after the split. Travis Tritt insisted on having the Long Run-era Eagles in his video for "Take It Easy" and they agreed. Following years of public speculation, the band formally reunited the following year. The lineup comprised the five Long Run-era members—Frey, Henley, Walsh, Felder, and Schmit—supplemented by Scott Crago (drums), John Corey (keyboards, guitar, backing vocals), Timothy Drury (keyboards, guitar, backing vocals), and Al Garth (saxophone, violin) on stage.

"For the record, we never broke up, we just took a 14-year vacation", announced Frey at their first live performance in April 1994. The ensuing tour spawned a live album titled Hell Freezes Over (named for Henley's recurring statement that the band would get back together "when hell freezes over"), which debuted at No. 1 on the Billboard album chart. It included four new studio songs, with "Get Over It" and "Love Will Keep Us Alive" both becoming Top 40 hits. The album proved as successful as the tour, selling 6 million copies in the U.S. The tour was interrupted in September 1994 because of a recurrence of Frey's diverticulitis, but it resumed in 1995 and continued into 1996.

In 1998, the Eagles, including Walsh, were inducted into the Rock and Roll Hall of Fame. For the induction ceremony, all seven Eagles members (Walsh along with Frey, Henley, Leadon, Meisner, Felder, and Schmit) played together for two songs, "Take It Easy" and "Hotel California". Several subsequent reunion tours followed (without Leadon or Meisner), notable for their record-setting ticket prices.

The concert recordings were released on CD as part of the four-disc Selected Works: 1972–1999 box set in November 2000. Along with the millennium concert, this set included the band's hit singles, album tracks and outtakes from The Long Run sessions. Selected Works received platinum certification from the RIAA in 2002.

The lineup consisting of Walsh with Frey, Henley and Schmit toured beginning in 2001, and a greatest hits album including the entire Eagles career, The Very Best Of., was released in 2003. A live two-disc DVD, Farewell 1 Tour-Live from Melbourne, including Walsh and featuring two new songs: Frey's "No More Cloudy Days" and Walsh's "One Day at a Time" was released in 2005.

In 2007, the Eagles, including Walsh, released a single, "How Long", written by JD Souther. Later that year, the Walsh-era Eagles released Long Road Out of Eden, their first album of all-new material since 1979. The album debuted at number 1 in the U.S., the UK, Australia, New Zealand, the Netherlands, and Norway. It became their third studio album and seventh release overall to be certified at least seven times platinum by RIAA. The Eagles, including Walsh, began a world tour in support of Long Road Out of Eden in 2008.

=== Other bands ===
In late 1984, Walsh was contacted by Australian musician Paul Christie, the former bassist for Mondo Rock. Christie invited him to come to Australia to perform with the Party Boys, an all-star band with a floating membership of well-known Australian rock musicians, including the critically acclaimed guitarist Kevin Borich, with whom Walsh became good friends. Walsh accepted and performed with the Party Boys on their late-1984–early-1985 Australian tour and appeared on their live album, You Need Professional Help. He remained in Australia for some time after the tour, putting together the short-lived touring band "Creatures From America", with Waddy Wachtel (guitar), Rick Rosas (bass guitar), and Australian drummer Richard Harvey (Divinyls, the Party Boys).

In 1987, Walsh returned to the United States to work on his album Got Any Gum?, which was produced by Terry Manning and features vocal contributions from JD Souther and Survivor's lead singer Jimi Jamison. After the album's commercial disappointment, Walsh decided to return to Australia in 1989 to tour with another incarnation of the Party Boys.

Walsh also toured with Ringo Starr & His All-Starr Band in 1989 and 1992, alternating a handful of his best-known songs with Starr's and tunes by other members of the All-Starr Band.

In 1989, Walsh recorded an MTV Unplugged with the R&B musician Dr. John. Also in 1989 Walsh filmed a live concert from the Wiltern Theater in Los Angeles with Etta James and Albert Collins, called Jazzvisions: Jump the Blues Away. While producing their Homegrown album in 1989, Walsh briefly joined New Zealand reggae band Herbs. Although he had left by the time of its 1990 release, he still appears as lead singer on two tracks, "Up All Night" and "It's Alright". The album includes the first recording of his "Ordinary Average Guys" (sung by late Herbs and Be Bop Deluxe bassist Charlie Tumahai), which subsequently became a solo hit for Walsh as "Ordinary Average Guy".

In late 1990, Walsh was part of a band called the Best, along with keyboardist Keith Emerson, bassist John Entwistle, guitarist Jeff "Skunk" Baxter and drummer Simon Phillips. The band performed several shows in Hawaii and Japan, with a live video resulting.

In 1993, Walsh teamed up with Glenn Frey for the "Party of Two" tour in the United States. Also in 1993, Walsh, Terry Reid, Nicky Hopkins, Rick Rosas, and Phil Jones put together an informal group called the Flew. They played one show at The Coach House in San Juan Capistrano. This was Nicky Hopkins' last public performance before his death.

In 1996, James Gang did a reunion for President Bill Clinton. The band consisted of their "classic" lineup (Walsh, Peters, Fox); they performed at the Cleveland State University Convocation Center on November 4, 1996.

In 1998, ABC wanted to use a classic rock song for Monday Night Football that year, so they asked Walsh to rewrite the lyrics to "Rocky Mountain Way" for the quarterback John Elway of the Denver Broncos. "Rocky Mountain Elway" was the new title of the song, and Walsh appeared in a video that ABC showed on Monday Night Football.

=== 2000s and 2010s ===
In June 2004, Walsh performed at Eric Clapton's Crossroads Guitar Festival in Dallas, Texas. He was also featured in September 2004 at the Strat Pack, a concert held in London, England, to mark the 50th anniversary of the Fender Stratocaster guitar. In 2006, Walsh reunited with Jim Fox and Dale Peters of the James Gang for new recordings and a 15-date summer reunion tour. The tour lasted into the fall.

In 2008, Walsh appeared on the Carvin 60th Anniversary Celebration DVD as a celebrity endorser. In the recorded interview, he highly praised Carvin Guitars and claims that the bridge design is "just like the first Les Paul models. I can't even get Gibson to reissue it."

Kent State University awarded Walsh an honorary degree in music in December 2001. In May 2012, the Berklee College of Music awarded Walsh, along with other members of the Eagles, an honorary doctorate for his accomplishments in the field of music.

== Notable appearances ==
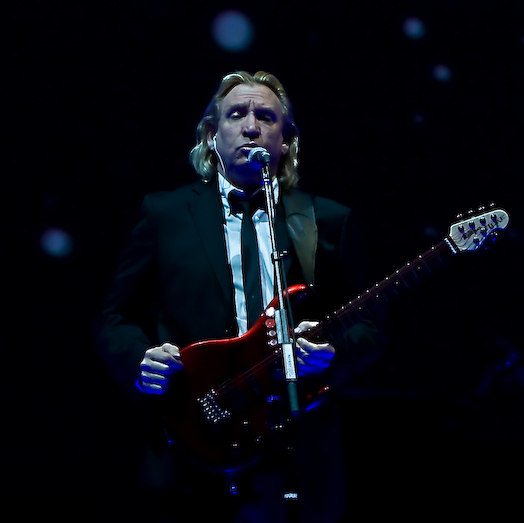
Walsh performing with the Eagles in 2009

In 1974, Walsh produced Dan Fogelberg's Souvenirs album and played the guitar, electric guitar, 12 string guitar, ARP bass and provided backing vocals. He also contacted Graham Nash to sing harmony vocals on "Part of the Plan", which helped send the album to No. 17 on the 1975 Billboard album chart.

In 1973 Walsh supplied the slide guitar solo on Michael Stanley's song "Rosewood Bitters". Walsh later lifted part of that solo and used it prominently in the Eagles' hit "Life in the Fast Lane".

In 1981, Walsh and former Barnstorm bandmate Joe Vitale went to work on old friend John Entwistle's fifth solo album Too Late the Hero, whenever they were free to work on it. The album turned out to become John Entwistle's best-charting solo album, with hit singles "Talk Dirty" and "Too Late the Hero".

Walsh was a background musician (1st guitar solo) on Eagles bandmember Don Henley's 1982 hit "Dirty Laundry" (listed as such in the liner notes of I Can't Stand Still and Actual Miles: Henley's Greatest Hits). Walsh has also contributed to albums by Ringo Starr; America; REO Speedwagon; Jay Ferguson; Andy Gibb; Wilson Phillips; Emerson, Lake & Palmer; and Steve Winwood; and to the Richard Marx hit single "Don't Mean Nothing".

Walsh was a regular guest DJ on Los Angeles radio station KLOS during the mid-1980s. They had a Saturday evening feature, with celebrity guest-hosts taking over the microphone (Walsh was the guest host far more frequently than any other). He was also a frequent guest and guest-host of Detroit and Chicago radio personality Steve Dahl.

Onscreen, Walsh has appeared in The Blues Brothers, Promised Land, The Drew Carey Show, Duckman, MADtv, Live from Daryl's House, Rock the Cradle, Zachariah., and The Conners

In October 2004, Walsh undertook speaking engagements in New Zealand to warn against the dangers of substance abuse. He said the visit was a "thank you" to people who took him to Otatara Pa when he toured New Zealand with reggae band Herbs while under heavy alcohol and cocaine addictions in 1989, an experience he has cited as the beginning of a long journey back to good health. At Otatara Pa in 2004 Walsh said, "This is a special place, and it is very special to me. It was here on a visit many years ago, up on the hills, that I had a moment of clarity. I don't understand it, but I reconnected with my soul, and I remembered who I used to be. I admitted I had problems and I had to do something about it. It was the beginning of my recovery from my addiction to alcohol and drugs, and when I got back to America it gave me the courage to seek help."

On February 12, 2012, Walsh appeared on stage with Paul McCartney, Bruce Springsteen, Dave Grohl, and McCartney's band at the Staples Center in Los Angeles to close out the Grammy Awards. Walsh also appeared on the 60th Episode of Live from Daryl's House with Daryl Hall, which premiered on November 15, 2012.

On February 9, 2014, Walsh was featured in several songs on the CBS special The Night That Changed America: A Grammy Salute to the Beatles.

In 2014, Walsh made a guest appearance on Foo Fighters' eighth studio album Sonic Highways.

On May 24, 2016, Walsh appeared on NBC's The Voice in which he played slide guitar, talk box and performed Rocky Mountain Way with contestant Laith Al-Sall

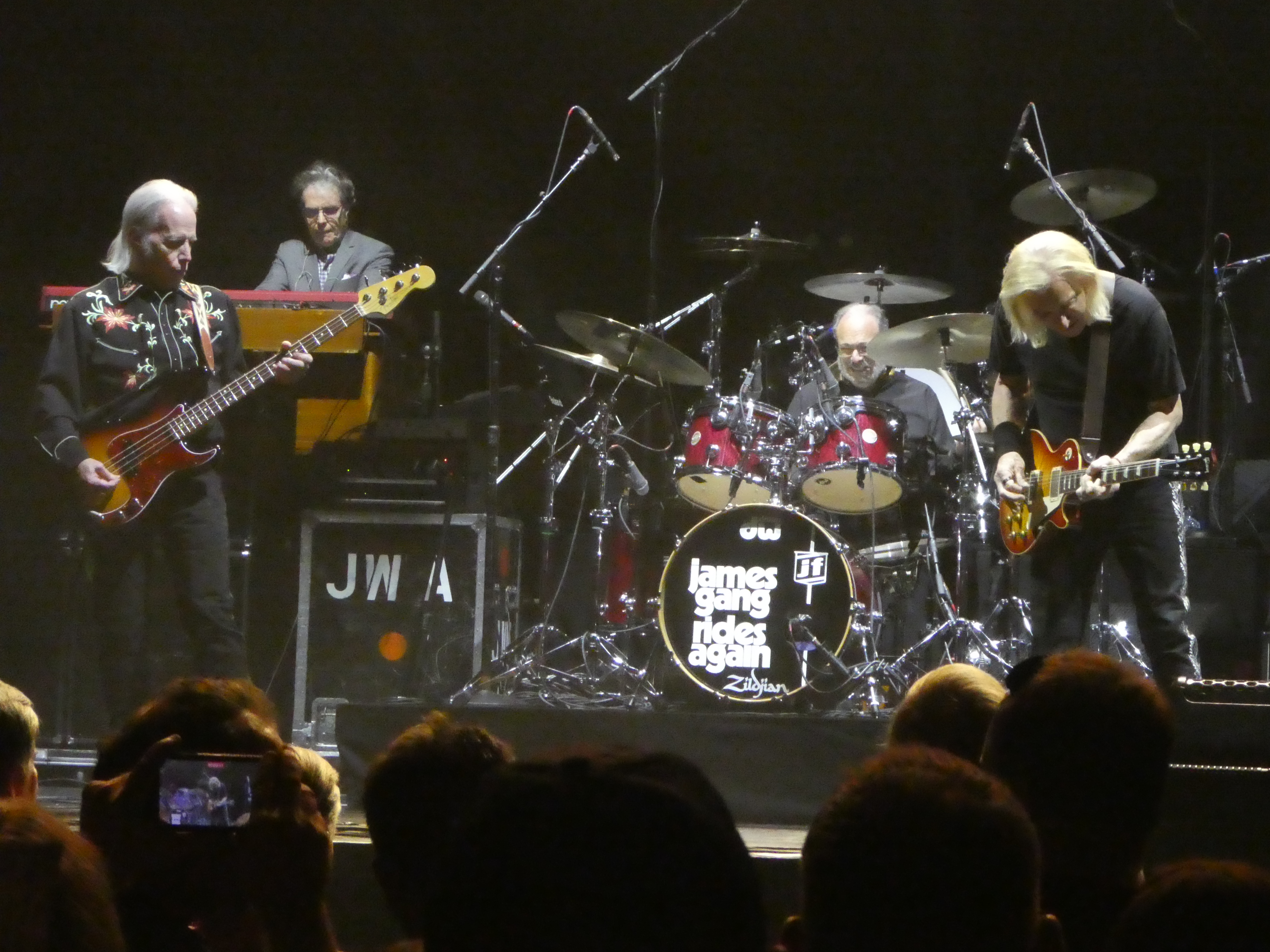
James Gang at 2022 VetsAid concert

On September 3, 2022, Walsh appeared in London, with recently reunited James Gang, at the Taylor Hawkins Tribute Concert at Wembley Stadium which was simulcast live and worldwide on the web, television and streaming platforms; notably, on streaming service Paramount + which aired a live complete/full version of the 339 minute concert that was uncut without commercials. For their final song, Dave Grohl played with James Gang on "Funk 49" as second/backup drummer. Walsh sang lead vocals and played lead guitar (a PRS), including slide guitar, for three songs.

Walsh also appeared with the James Gang at the September 27, 2022, Taylor Hawkins Tribute Concert at the Kia Forum in Inglewood, California, near Los Angeles As in London, their three-song set consisted of "Walk Away", "The Bomber: Closet Queen / Boléro / Cast Your Fate to the Wind" and "Funk 49" with Dave Grohl as the second drummer on the latter.

At the 2022 VetsAid benefit, Joe Walsh did double duty, performing a nine-song set with the James Gang then returning for a four-song finale backed by Nathan East, Joe Vitale and Tom Bukovac. Walsh was joined by Dave Grohl, who played guitar on "Life's Been Good." On "Rocky Mountain Way", Dave Grohl played drums, the Breeders sang backing vocals and Roy Orbison III, godson of Walsh and grandson of Roy Orbison, played guitar.

== Influences ==
Walsh cites influences from rock and pop bands and guitarists, many of whom he has encountered on concert tours: Les Paul, Jimi Hendrix, B.B. King, Chuck Berry, Little Richard, Eric Clapton, the Rolling Stones, the Beach Boys, Jeff Beck, the Beatles, Jimmy Page and Led Zeppelin, Ritchie Blackmore and Deep Purple, Manfred Mann, Duane Allman and the Allman Brothers, Ronnie Wood and the Faces, Pete Townshend and the Who, and the Ventures. In turn, he has influenced Dan Fogelberg, Maroon 5, Kenny Chesney, Jonny Lang, Blitzen Trapper, the Fabulous Thunderbirds, and George Thorogood. Duane Allman of the Allman Brothers Band taught Walsh how to play the slide guitar.

== Public service ==
Walsh is active in charity work and has performed in a number of concerts to raise money for charitable causes. He has also been a personal contributor to a number of charity causes including halfway houses for displaced adult women in Wichita, Kansas. Walsh funded the first talent-based scholarship at Kent State University in 2008.

Walsh's love of Santa Cruz Island grew into a lifelong commitment to conserve the environment there, and he has been active in preserving the island's parks. He is President of the Santa Cruz Island Foundation, and has served on the Foundation's board since the 1980s.

Walsh had often joked about running for office, announcing a mock presidential campaign in 1980 and a vice presidential campaign in 1992. Walsh ran for President of the United States in 1980, promising to make "Life's Been Good" the new national anthem if he won, and ran on a platform of "Free Gas For Everyone". Though Walsh was only 32 at the time of the election and thus would not have met the 35-year-old requirement to actually assume office, he said that he wanted to raise public awareness of the election. In 1992 Walsh ran for vice president with Rev. Goat Carson under the slogan "We Want Our Money Back!"

In an interview to promote his album Analog Man in 2012, Walsh revealed he was considering a serious bid for political office. "I think I would run seriously, and I think I would run for Congress", Walsh told WASH in Washington, D.C. "The root of the problem is that Congress is so dysfunctional. We're dead in the water until Congress gets to work and passes some new legislation to change things."

In 2017, Walsh contacted others in the music industry, including the Zac Brown Band, Gary Clark Jr., and Keith Urban, to try to organize and perform what became VetsAid – a concert series along the lines of Willie Nelson's Farm Aid.

== Personal life ==
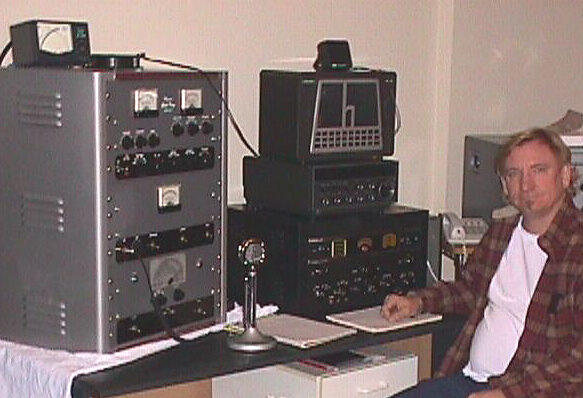
Walsh in front of his vintage amateur radio station WB6ACU, 2006

Joe Walsh, WB6ACU, on ham radio

Walsh has been married five times. He was married briefly to Margie Walsh in the 1960s, to Stefany Rhodes from 1971 to 1978, to Juanita Boyer from 1980 to 1988, and to Denise Driscoll from 1999 to 2006. Walsh married Marjorie Bach (sister of Barbara Bach and sister-in-law of Ringo Starr) in Los Angeles on December 13, 2008. His sister-in-law Susan Walsh, married to Walsh's brother, has been a missing person since 1996.

Walsh's daughter Lucy Walsh is a musician who has worked with Ashlee Simpson and others. She released her debut solo album, Lost in the Lights, in 2007.

Walsh's eldest daughter, Emma Kristen, was born on April 29, 1971, and died on April 1, 1974, just shy of 3 years of age from injuries in a car accident on her way to nursery school. Her story inspired the track "Song for Emma" on Walsh's solo album So What released later that year. In her memory, he had a drinking fountain and memorial plaque placed in a park in which she played, North Boulder Park in Boulder, Colorado. He has said that the album name So What was a result of Emma's death, that nothing else seemed meaningful or important in the months that followed. The strain eventually contributed to Walsh's divorce from his second wife Stefany. While touring with singer Stevie Nicks in 1984, Walsh took Nicks to the park's fountain; this inspired Nicks to write "Has Anyone Ever Written Anything for You?" on her 1985 album Rock A Little. Nicks told the UK's The Daily Telegraph in 2007 that Walsh had been "the great love of my life." "Joe and I broke up because of the coke", she elaborated to Q. "He told my friend and singer Sharon [Celani], 'I'm leaving Stevie, because I'm afraid that one of us is going to die. And the other one won't be able to save the other person, because our cocaine habit has become so over the top now that neither of us can live through this. So the only way to save both of us is for me to leave.'"

Walsh has had a variety of health issues over the years, and has claimed to have attention deficit hyperactivity disorder, obsessive–compulsive disorder and Asperger syndrome.

=== Alcohol and drug addiction ===
Walsh admits to struggling with alcohol and drug addictions for most of his early career, and has been in recovery since 1993. In 1989, while touring with New Zealand band Herbs, Walsh experienced an epiphany during a visit to Otatara Pa, an ancient Māori pā site in the Hawke's Bay region. In 2004, on a return visit to New Zealand, Walsh described the experience and hailed it as the beginning of his recovery from his addictions. Walsh also claimed that he woke up after blacking out on an airplane to Paris in 1991, arriving with his passport but no memory of getting on the plane. It was another turning point in his recovery, and he has been sober ever since.

=== Amateur radio ===
While living in New York City, Walsh began a lifelong interest in amateur radio. He holds an Amateur Extra Class Amateur Radio License, and his station callsign is WB6ACU. In 2006, he donated an autographed guitar to the American Radio Relay League (ARRL) in Newington, Connecticut, for its charity auction. He has also been involved with the group's "Big Project", which brings amateur radio into schools. Walsh has included Morse code messages in his albums on two occasions: on the album Barnstorm, ("Register and Vote"); and on Songs for a Dying Planet, ("Register and Vote for Me"). Walsh provides the theme song (which includes Morse code) for the TWiT podcast Ham Nation (debuting in 2011), and he appeared as a guest in the first podcast, as well as episode 400.

== Instruments ==
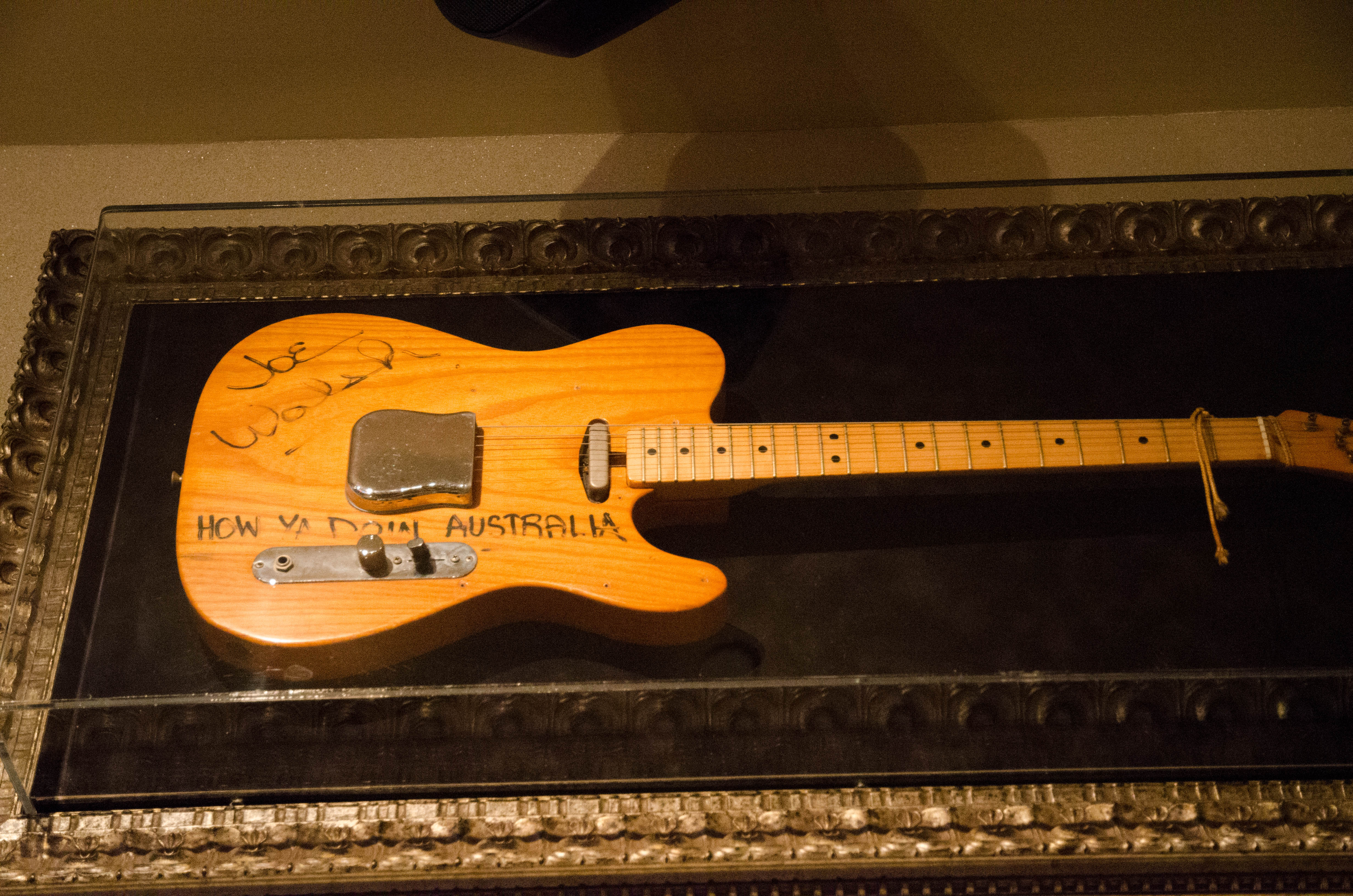
Walsh's Fender Telecaster, on display in the Hard Rock Cafe, Sydney, 2012

Walsh sold his 1959 sunburst Gibson Les Paul to then Led Zeppelin lead guitarist Jimmy Page in 1969, who dubbed it his "Number 1".

In 1970, Walsh gave a 1959 Gretsch 6120 to the Who's lead guitarist Pete Townshend, who used the Gretsch in the studio to record tracks on albums such as Who's Next and Quadrophenia.

In addition to a Fender Telecaster, Walsh has also played other guitars, including:

- Carvin DC4, CT6, CT4, CS4, and various other models
- Duesenberg Starplayer Alliance - Walsh has an Alliance guitar he co-developed
- PRS McCarty 594 Singlecut Joe Walsh - Signature model developed by Paul Reed Smith guitars in collaboration with Walsh

He is also known for using a Marshall 50-watt Plexi amplifier.

== Discography ==
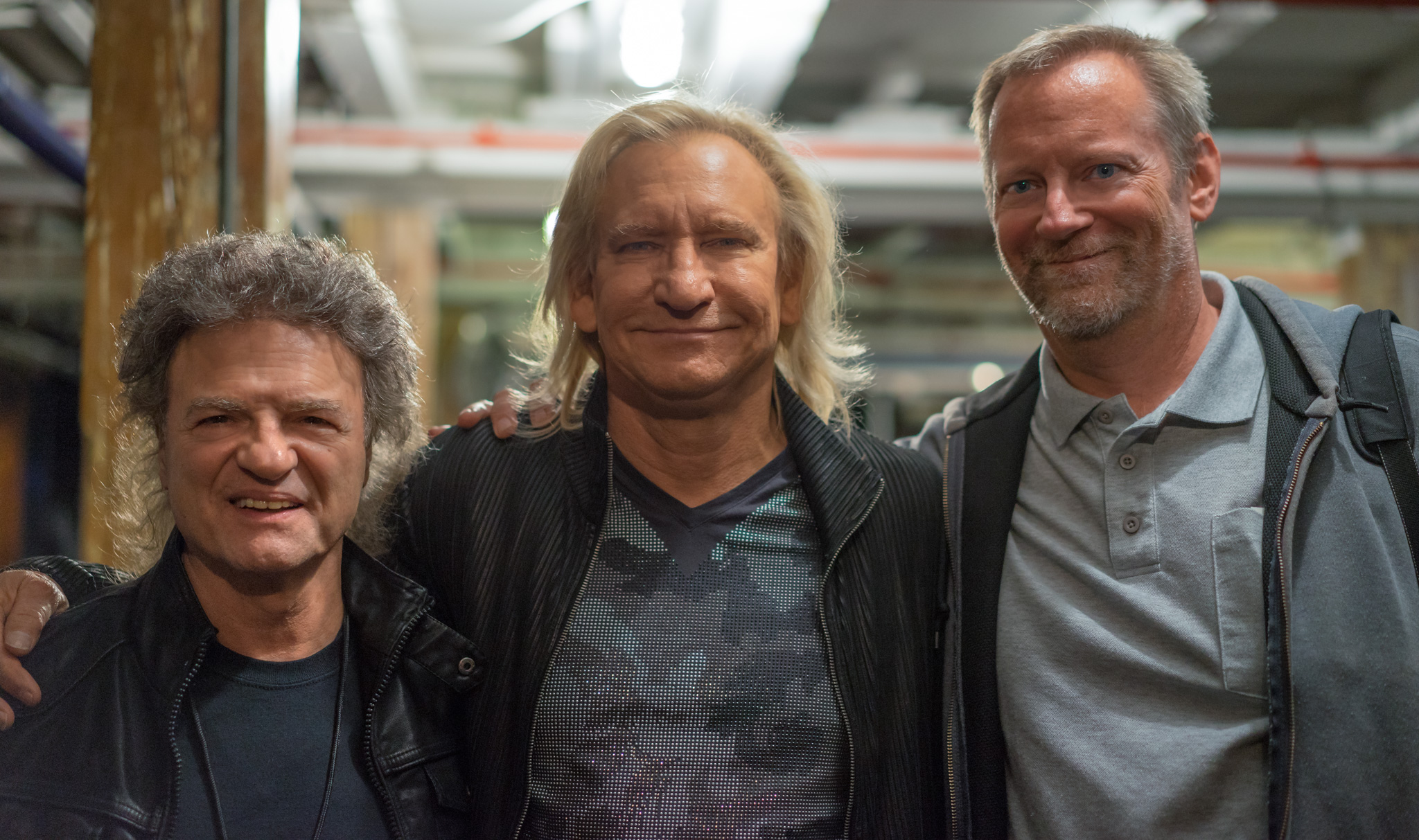
Joe Vitale, Walsh and Ted Jensen at the Capitol Theatre, 2015

=== Solo ===
- Barnstorm (1972)
- The Smoker You Drink, the Player You Get (1973)
- So What (1974)
- You Can't Argue with a Sick Mind (1976)
- But Seriously, Folks... (1978)
- There Goes the Neighborhood (1981)
- You Bought It – You Name It (1983)
- The Confessor (1985)
- Got Any Gum? (1987)
- Ordinary Average Guy (1991)
- Songs for a Dying Planet (1992)
- Analog Man (2012)

=== James Gang ===
- Yer' Album (1969)
- James Gang Rides Again (1970)
- Thirds (1971)

=== Eagles ===
- Hotel California (1976)
- The Long Run (1979)
- Long Road out of Eden (2007)

== Eagles lead vocals and writing ==
Lead vocals

Year	Song	Album
1976	"Pretty Maids All in a Row"	Hotel California
1979	"In the City"	The Long Run
2007	"Guilty of the Crime"	Long Road Out Of Eden
2007	"Last Good Time in Town"	Long Road Out Of Eden

Original songs

Year	Song	Writers	Album
1976	"Life in the Fast Lane"	Joe Walsh, Don Henley, Glenn Frey	Hotel California
1976	"Pretty Maids All in a Row"	Joe Walsh, Joe Vitale	Hotel California
1979	"The Sad Café"	Joe Walsh, JD Souther, Don Henley, Glenn Frey	The Long Run
1979	"In the City"	Joe Walsh, Barry De Vorzon	The Long Run
2007	"Last Good Time In Town"	Joe Walsh, JD Souther	Long Road Out of Eden

Note: Other songs in the Eagles catalog that were sung and written by Walsh include "Life's Been Good" and "All Night Long", from Walsh's solo career, which were included on Eagles Live, and "Funk 49", from Walsh's days in the James Gang, was included on the fourth "Millennium Concert" disc of the Eagles box set Selected Works: 1972-1999. The band has also been known to play "Rocky Mountain Way", as seen on the Farewell Tour I DVD. These are not Eagles songs however, since the studio tracks did not originate under the Eagles name.

== Filmography ==
=== Film ===
- 1971: Zachariah Film by George Englund. With Don Johnson: Himself with the James Gang.
- 1980: The Blues Brothers: A prisoner dancing on a table.
- 1990: The Best - DVD With Keith Emerson, Jeff Baxter, Joe Walsh, John Entwistle, Simon Phillips: Himself.

=== Television ===
- Mad TV, as himself, in Episode 1.2 (1995)
- Promised land, as R.J., "The Prodigy" (1996)
- Duckman, voicing himself, "They Craved Duckman's Brain!" (1996) and "Love! Anger! Kvetching!" (1997)
- The Drew Carey Show, 7 episodes as Ed ["Drewstock" (1997), "In Ramada Da Vida" (1998), "Golden Boy" (1998), "Drew Between the Rock and a Hard Place" (1998), "Boy Party/Girl Party" (1999), "Steve and Mimi Get Married" (1999), "Drew's in a Coma" (2001)]
- Drew Carey's Improv All-Stars, guest (2001)
- Rock the Cradle (2008), a reality show, the father of contestant Lucy Walsh
- Wicked City, as a director, "Running With the Devil" (2015)
- Criminal Minds, as himself, "The Sandman" (2016)
- Better Things, as himself "Hair of the Dog" (2016)
- The Conners, as Jesse, "Patriarchs and Goddesses" (2022), "A Judge and A Priest Walk Into A Living Room..." (2022)

== Awards ==
- As a member of the Eagles, Walsh has won five Grammy Awards:
  - (1977) Record of the Year: "Hotel California" (single)
  - (1977) Best Arrangement for Voices: "New Kid in Town"
  - (1979) Best Rock Vocal performance by a Duo or Group: "Heartache Tonight"
  - (2008) Best Country Performance by a Duo or Group with Vocals: "How Long"
  - (2009) Best Pop Instrumental Performance: "I Dreamed There Was No War"
- Walsh was inducted into the Rock and Roll Hall of Fame in 1998
- Walsh was inducted into the Vocal Group Hall of Fame in 2001

== See also ==
- List of artists who reached number one on the U.S. Mainstream Rock chart
