= List of James Gang members =

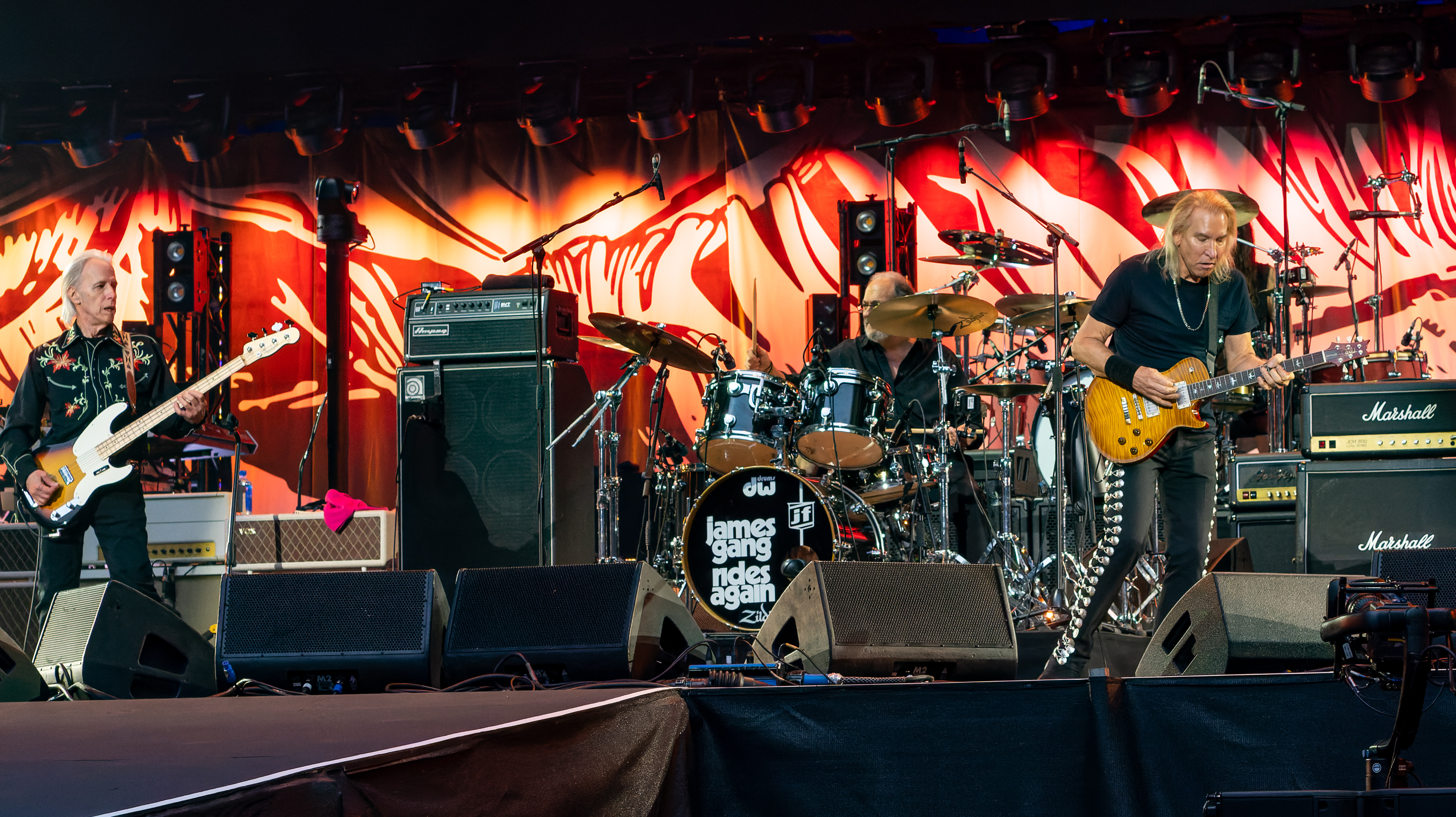
A reunited James Gang performing in 2022

James Gang was an American hard rock band from Cleveland, Ohio. Formed in 1966, the group originally consisted of vocalist and keyboardist Phil Giallombardo, lead guitarist Greg Grandillo, rhythm guitarist Ronnie Silverman, bassist Tom Kriss, and drummer Jimmy Fox. When the band broke up in early 1977, the lineup featured constant member Fox and Giallombardo (who rejoined in 1976 after leaving in 1968), alongside bassist Dale Peters (who joined in 1969) and guitarist Bob Webb (who joined in 1976). Following their disbandment, the classic lineup of vocalist and guitarist Joe Walsh alongside Peters and Fox have reunited on several occasions for one-off live performances and occasional tours.

== History ==
James Gang was formed in 1966 by Phil Giallombardo, Ronnie Silverman, Tom Kriss and Jimmy Fox, who worked with a succession of lead guitarists. Before the end of 1966, Glenn Schwartz had taken over lead guitar duties. The next summer, Silverman left to join the army and was replaced in the group by Bill Jeric. At the end of 1967, Schwartz left to relocate to Los Angeles, California where he formed Pacific Gas & Electric. Schwartz was replaced in the new year by Joe Walsh. On the eve of a show supporting Cream in June, Silverman left and the group became a trio, with Walsh taking over on lead vocals.

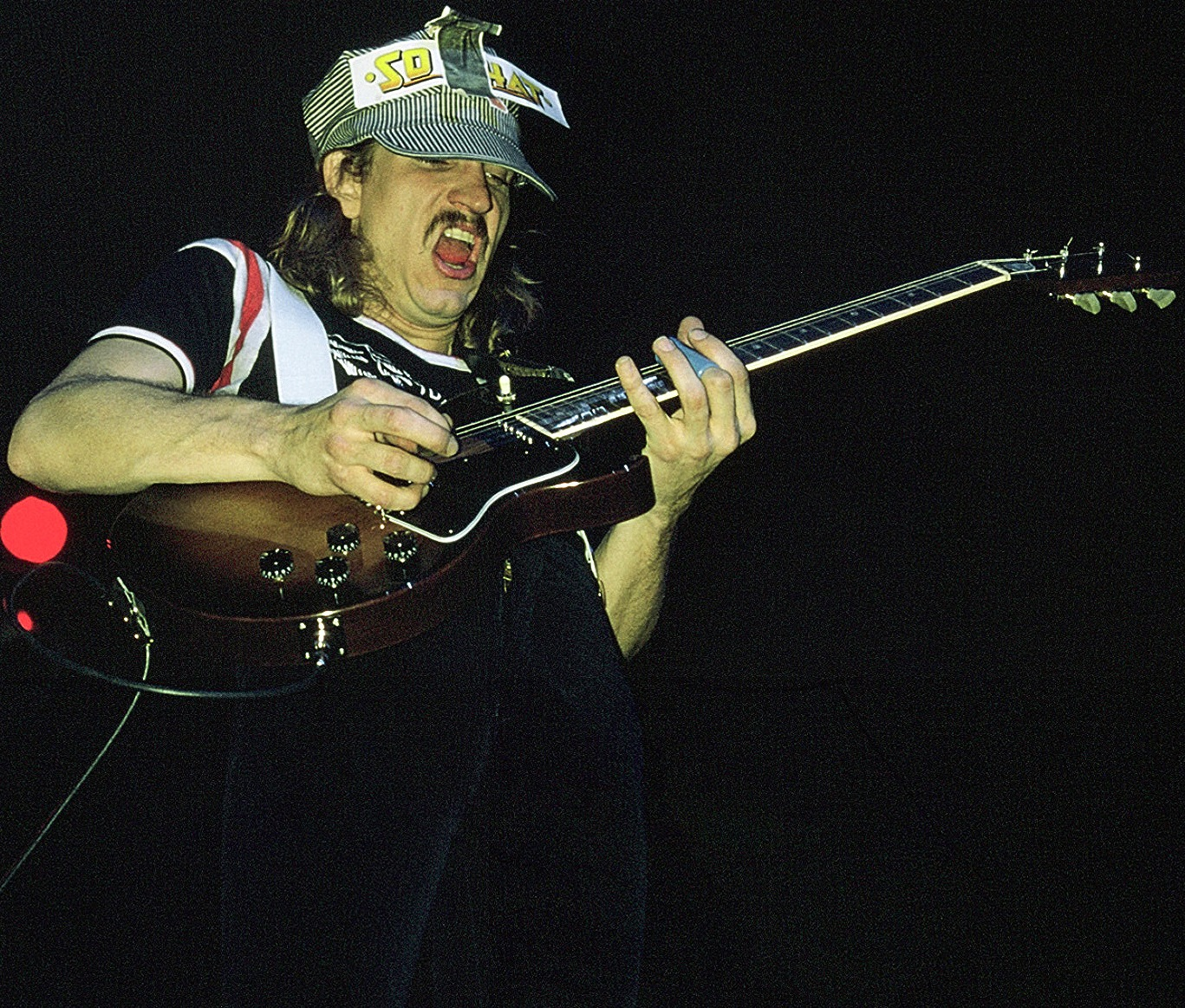
Joe Walsh took over as James Gang's vocalist in 1968 for their first three studio albums.

The lineup of Walsh, Kriss and Fox released James Gang's debut, Yer' Album, in March 1969. Just before recording the follow-up James Gang Rides Again that November, Kriss was replaced by Dale Peters. James Gang Rides Again was followed by Thirds and the band's first live album Live in Concert in 1971, before Walsh left at the end of the year to pursue new projects, later claiming that "I was frustrated just being the only melodic instrument [in the band] ... I wanted to expand and try something else." Early the next year, Peters and Fox were joined by two new members – vocalist Roy Kenner and guitarist Domenic Troiano, both formerly of Mandala and Bush.

After releasing Straight Shooter and Passin' Thru in 1972, Troiano left James Gang in August 1973. He was replaced immediately by Tommy Bolin, who debuted quickly on the band's next album Bang. After releasing the follow-up Miami in the summer of 1974, Kenner left the group that September to return to his native Toronto. He was followed the next month by Bolin. After a brief hiatus, Peters and Fox formed a new incarnation of James Gang in early 1975 with vocalist Robert "Bubba" Keith and guitarist Richard Shack, who recorded Newborn. By the end of the year, Keith had been replaced by original frontman Phil Giallombardo, while Shack had made way for Bob Webb, both of whom performed on the 1976 album Jesse Come Home. After a final period of touring, James Gang finally disbanded in early 1977.

Since their original breakup, James Gang's classic lineup of Joe Walsh, Dale Peters and Jimmy Fox have temporarily reunited on several occasions. The first time was in July 1991, when they performed "Funk #49" during a Walsh solo show. Next, the group played at an election rally for Bill Clinton in November 1996, followed by a performance on The Drew Carey Show in 1998. In February 2001, the trio (joined by keyboardist Mark Avsec) played three shows at the Rock and Roll Hall of Fame and Allen Theatre in Cleveland. During August and September 2006, the band performed its longest reunion tour to date in the US. For the shows, the core trio were joined by keyboardist Bill Appleberry, plus backing vocalists Gia Ciambotti, Robbyn Kirmsse and Stacy Michelle. The band performed at the Taylor Hawkins Tribute Concerts at Wembley Stadium and the Kia Forum in September 2022. On November 13, 2022, supported by Mark Avsec and a vocal trio, and joined on their encore by Dave Grohl on drums, the group performed at the VetsAid concert in Columbus, Ohio. While this was billed as "One Last Ride" for the James Gang, Joe Walsh later raised the possibility of more James Gang performances.

== Members ==
=== Latest ===
| Image | Name | Years active | Instruments | Release contributions |
|---|---|---|---|---|
| | Jimmy Fox | 1966–1977; 2001; 2005; 2006 (plus one-off reunions in 1991, 1996, 1998 and 2022) | drums; percussion; keyboards; occasional guitar; backing vocals | all James Gang releases |
| | Joe Walsh | 1968–1971; 2001; 2005; 2006 (plus one-off reunions in 1991, 1996, 1998 and 2022) | lead vocals; lead and rhythm guitars; keyboards | all James Gang releases from Yer Album (1969) to; Live in Concert (1971) |
| | Dale Peters | 1969–1977; 2001; 2005; 2006 (plus one-off reunions in 1991, 1996, 1998 and 2022) | bass; percussion; backing and lead vocals | all James Gang releases from James Gang Rides Again (1970) onwards |

=== Former ===
| Image | Name | Years active | Instruments | Release contributions |
|---|---|---|---|---|
| | Tom Kriss | 1966–1969 (died 2013) | bass; backing vocals | Yer' Album (1969) |
| | Phil Giallombardo | 1966–1968; 1975–1977 | lead vocals; keyboards | Jesse Come Home (1976) |
| | Ronnie Silverman | 1966–1967; 1968 | rhythm guitar | none |
| | Greg Grandillo | 1966 | lead guitar | none |
| | Dennis Chandler | 1966 | lead guitar | none |
| | John "Mouse" Michalski | 1966 | lead guitar | none |
| | Glenn Schwartz | 1966–1967 (died 2018) | lead guitar | none |
| | Bill Jeric | 1967–1968 | rhythm guitar | none |
| | Roy Kenner | 1972–1974 | lead vocals; percussion; harmonica | all James Gang releases from Straight Shooter (1972) to Miami (1974) |
| | Domenic Troiano | 1972–1973 (died 2005) | lead and rhythm guitars; backing and lead vocals | Straight Shooter (1972); Passin' Thru (1972) |
| | Tommy Bolin | 1973–1974 (died 1976) | lead and rhythm guitars; synthesizers; backing and lead vocals | Bang (1973); Miami (1974) |
| | Robert "Bubba" Keith | 1975 | lead vocals; rhythm guitar | Newborn (1975) |
| | Richard Shack | 1975 | lead guitar; backing vocals | Newborn (1975) |
| | Bob Webb | 1975–1977 | lead and rhythm guitars; backing and lead vocals | Thirds (1971) – guest appearance on one track; Jesse Come Home (1976) |

=== Touring ===
| Image | Name | Years active | Instruments | Details |
|---|---|---|---|---|
| | Mark Avsec | 2001; 2005; 2022 | keyboards | Avsec joined Walsh, Peters and Fox for three shows in February 2001,two in June 2005, and one in November 2022. |
| | Bill Appleberry | 2006 | keyboards | Appleberry, Ciambotti, Kirmsse and Michelle completed the James Gang tour in summer 2006. |
| | Gia Ciambotti | 2006 | backing vocals | Appleberry, Ciambotti, Kirmsse and Michelle completed the James Gang tour in summer 2006. |
| | Robbyn Kirmsse | 2006 | backing vocals | Appleberry, Ciambotti, Kirmsse and Michelle completed the James Gang tour in summer 2006. |
| | Stacy Michelle | 2006 | backing vocals | Appleberry, Ciambotti, Kirmsse and Michelle completed the James Gang tour in summer 2006. |

== Lineups ==
| Period | Members | Releases |
|---|---|---|
| 1966 | Phil Giallombardo – lead vocals, keyboards; Greg Grandillo – lead guitar; Ronnie Silverman – rhythm guitar; Tom Kriss – bass, backing vocals; Jimmy Fox – drums, keyboards, percussion, backing vocals | none |
| 1966 | Phil Giallombardo – lead vocals, keyboards; Dennis Chandler – lead guitar; Ronnie Silverman – rhythm guitar; Tom Kriss – bass, backing vocals; Jimmy Fox – drums, keyboards, percussion, backing vocals | none |
| 1966 | Phil Giallombardo – lead vocals, keyboards; John Michalski – lead guitar; Ronnie Silverman – rhythm guitar; Tom Kriss – bass, backing vocals; Jimmy Fox – drums, keyboards, percussion, backing vocals | none |
| 1966–1967 | Phil Giallombardo – lead vocals, keyboards; Glenn Schwartz – lead guitar; Ronnie Silverman – rhythm guitar; Tom Kriss – bass, backing vocals; Jimmy Fox – drums, keyboards, percussion, backing vocals | none |
| June – December 1967 | Phil Giallombardo – lead vocals, keyboards; Glenn Schwartz – lead guitar; Bill Jeric – rhythm guitar; Tom Kriss – bass, backing vocals; Jimmy Fox – drums, keyboards, percussion, backing vocals | none |
| January – May 1968 | Phil Giallombardo – lead vocals, keyboards; Joe Walsh – lead guitar, backing vocals; Bill Jeric – rhythm guitar; Tom Kriss – bass, backing vocals; Jimmy Fox – drums, keyboards, percussion, backing vocals | none |
| May – June 1968 | Joe Walsh – lead vocals, lead guitar, keyboards; Ronnie Silverman – rhythm guitar; Tom Kriss – bass, backing vocals; Jimmy Fox – drums, keyboards, percussion, backing vocals | none |
| June 1968 – October 1969 | Joe Walsh – lead vocals, guitar, keyboards; Tom Kriss – bass, backing vocals; Jimmy Fox – drums, keyboards, percussion, backing vocals | Yer' Album (1969) |
| October 1969 – December 1971 | Joe Walsh – lead vocals, guitar, keyboards; Dale Peters – bass, percussion, backing vocals; Jimmy Fox – drums, keyboards, percussion, backing vocals | James Gang Rides Again (1970); Thirds (1971); Live in Concert (1971) |
| January 1972 – August 1973 | Roy Kenner – lead vocals, harmonica, percussion; Domenic Troiano – guitar, backing vocals; Dale Peters – bass, percussion, backing vocals; Jimmy Fox – drums, keyboards, percussion, backing vocals | Straight Shooter (1972); Passin' Thru (1972) |
| August 1973 – September 1974 | Roy Kenner – lead vocals, harmonica, percussion; Tommy Bolin – guitar, synthesizers, vocals; Dale Peters – bass, percussion, backing vocals; Jimmy Fox – drums, keyboards, percussion, backing vocals | Bang (1973); Miami (1974) |
| Early – late 1975 | Bubba Keith – lead vocals, rhythm guitar; Richard Shack – lead guitar, backing vocals; Dale Peters – bass, percussion, backing vocals; Jimmy Fox – drums, keyboards, percussion, backing vocals | Newborn (1975) |
| Late 1975 – early 1977 | Phil Giallombardo – lead vocals, keyboards; Bob Webb – guitar, backing vocals; Dale Peters – bass, percussion, backing vocals; Jimmy Fox – drums, keyboards, percussion, backing vocals | Jesse Come Home (1976) |
Band inactive 1977–1991
| July 1991 November 1996 August 1998 | Joe Walsh – lead vocals, guitar; Dale Peters – bass, backing vocals; Jimmy Fox – drums, backing vocals | none – live performances only |
| February 2001 June 2005 | Joe Walsh – lead vocals, guitar; Dale Peters – bass, backing vocals; Jimmy Fox – drums, backing vocals; Mark Avsec – keyboards (touring) | none – live performances only |
| August – September 2006 | Joe Walsh – lead vocals, guitar; Dale Peters – bass, backing vocals; Jimmy Fox – drums, backing vocals; Bill Appleberry – keyboards (touring); Gia Ciambotti – backing vocals (touring); Robbyn Kirmsse – backing vocals (touring); Stacy Michelle – backing vocals (touring) | none – live performances only |
