= Toronto sound =

1960s R&B style

The Toronto sound was a characteristic R&B sound in the 1960s, heavily influenced by American R&B. Musically, its components typically consisted of heavy electric bass, New Orleans-style drumming, a dominant Hammond organ, and soul singing. Bands typically presented full shows complete with choreography like that of James Brown & the Famous Flames, and a matching wardrobe (cf. Mandala). Popular tunes were arranged by Toronto musicians, devotees of the Stax and Motown labels, and customized according to the will of the given bandleader. This sound came to influence many performers.

Musicians typically played in two areas of Toronto, Ontario. The first was Yorkville, then a centre for entertainment - initially coffeehouses and folk music but later becoming more "electrified." The second area was Yonge Street between King St. and Bloor which was more rock and roll, blues oriented.

== History ==
=== Originators ===
A list of predominant groups of the era included Little Caesar and the Consuls, Kay Taylor and the Regents, the Silhouettes, the Big Town Boys, David Clayton Thomas, Domenic Troiano, the Five Rogues/Mandala/Bush, George Olliver and the Soul Children, Eric Mercury, the Marcatos (also known as "David"), Diane Brooks and the Soul Searchers, Grant Smith & the Power, Steppenwolf (originating as Jack London and the Sparrows), Rick James, the Mynah Birds (including Neil Young and Rick James), the Plague, Jackie Shane, Bobby Kris and the Imperials, Shawne and Jay Jackson and the Majestics, Ronnie Hawkins and the Hawks (who became the Band), the Mid-Knights, Robbie Lane and the Disciples, Jackie Gabriel, Jack Harden and the Silhouettes, RK and the Associates, Jon and Lee & the Checkmates, who became Rhinoceros, Luke & The Apostles, and, later, Prakash John and the Lincolns, the James Stafford Set, and the Ugly Ducklings. Other popular Toronto groups were the Stitch-in-Tyme, Dee and the Yeoman, the Last Words, the Rising Sons, and many more.

=== Non-union musicians ===
The popular Toronto-based, non-union, groups of the era also played an important part in the development of the Toronto sound. Due to their non-union status they performed primarily at high schools, universities, and various dance clubs such as The Tam O'Shanter Golf and Country Club in Agincourt, The Broom and Stone Curling Club in eastern Scarborough, the El Mocambo, The Met, and The Bunny Bin/Gogue Inn in West Toronto.

The Marc Tymes, cited by Jay Shepherd as Toronto's #1 non-union R&B band of the day in The Scarborough Mirror (June 19, 1968, Page 17A), and many others such as the Blue Notes and the Corlaines, entertained Toronto audiences in various venues across the city and Southern Ontario.

Many of these bands played purely for the love of the music and for very little money. The Corlaines, for example, was formed mainly from Alderwood Collegiate Institute music students. They appeared at a variety of venues across southern Ontario (specifically Toronto and Mississauga). They started as a pure rock and roll band and evolved, adding R&B to their playlist.

Since the musicians were very young, often high school students, and lacked finances, the basics were simplified somewhat. Instrumentation was largely singer, lead guitar, sax, drums, bass and piano. Very few could afford a B3 organ -the Blue Notes were the first in the west end to be able to have this sound - most used the piano provided amplified with a contact microphone. Sets were influenced by bands such as Robbie Lane and Little Caeser and the Consuls and were heavy on Ray Charles, James Brown, Jimmy Reed, Sam Cooke and other major US R&B performers.

Also popular were "Battle of the Bands" events where non-union musicians gathered to compete for top honors at venues such as The Pavilion in Oshawa, Ontario. Their shows included both black lights and strobes for special effect. Usually all backup band members dressed in identical suits, often fashionably double breasted, while the singer/front man wore an alternative to offset him/her from the rest of the group. Their musical talents were primarily showcased in the form of cover versions of the popular R&B songs of the day. Instruments included drums, lead, bass, and rhythm guitars, organ, often a Hammond B3, a two to five piece horn section all showcasing a front man/soul singer. These non-union performers were as important, if not more important, than union bands in exposing Toronto youth under the age of majority to what developed into the Toronto sound.

=== Clubs in which the Toronto sound was developed ===
Yorkville

- The Riverboat
- The Purple Onion
- The Devil's Den
- El Patio
- The Penny Farthing
- The Mynah Bird
- Chez Monique
- The Embassy Tavern
- Boris's
- The Owl's Nest
- The Flick

On Yonge Street (from Bloor to King Street)

- Le Coq d'Or (with The Hawk's Nest above it)
- The Colonial Tavern
- The Saphire Tavern
- Club Blue Note
- The Zanzibar Tavern
- Club 888 (which became The Rockpile in 1968)
