= Prakash John =

Canadian bassist (born 1947)

- Born: 1 August 1947 (age 79); Mumbai, India
- Origin: Toronto, Canada
- Education: Cathedral and John Connon School
- Genres: Rock; R&B
- Occupation: Bassist
- Instrument: Bass guitar
- Years active: 1968–present

Prakash John (born August 1, 1947) is an Indian-Canadian rock and R&B bassist. He is known as one of the originators of the 'Toronto sound'.

== Early years ==
Prakash John was born on 1 August 1947, in Mumbai, India. At age four, he was enrolled at the prestigious Protestant Cathedral and John Connon School, where he learned to play the piano and violin, and was exposed to Western and classical music, particularly that of Johann Sebastian Bach, Wolfgang Amadeus Mozart, and Charles Wesley. In 1960, he and his family moved to Toronto, where he discovered WUFO 1080, an AM radio station in Buffalo, New York and, for the first time, heard American music and rhythm and blues. Inspired by Chuck Rainey, Motown legend James Jamerson, and Sly and the Family Stone bassist Larry Graham, John taught himself to play bass guitar.

== Career ==
=== Bush, Funkadelic, Parliament, 1969–1971 ===
In 1965, John went to a Wilson Pickett concert and was inspired to become a professional musician—not so much by Pickett's performance, but by that of the opening act, The Rogues (aka The Five Rogues). At his school, he formed his first R&B group, The Trikq, which served as the rhythm section for another band, George Olliver & The Soul Children. He became good enough so that, in 1970, he was scouted, and asked to audition, for a band called Mandala—which was the new name of, incredibly, The Rogues. Mandala was about to break up, but some of its members formed a new band, Bush, which consisted of guitarist Domenic Troiano, singer Roy Kenner, keyboardist Hugh Sullivan, John, and the Finnish-Canadian drummer Pentti Glan (aka 'Whitey'). It was Glan who would have the most influence on John, who said "He was a tremendous drummer and had tremendous sense of groove and an unusual grasp of funk for that time, the New Orleans funk. Because I liked his style of playing and I shaped mine to suit that, it was like magic when we played." Bush moved to Los Angeles, recorded the album Bush, toured with Steppenwolf, and played with, among others, John Mayall and Three Dog Night. Bush then broke up—Troiano and Kenner left to join James Gang and Glan went to work on the solo album of Steppenwolf frontman John Kay.

While in Los Angeles, John also taught guitar to Nick St. Nicholas (Steppenwolf), Kenny Gradney (Delaney & Bonnie and Little Feat), and Rosemary Butler (Birtha).

At that time, John declined several prestigious recording offers (Van Morrison's album Moondance) He was invited, by Bobby Whitlock, to join Derek & the Dominos, and he was asked, by Rick Derringer and Edgar Winter, to join White Trash, with Winter asking three times. Instead, he spent some time as a counselor at a camp for handicapped children, where his mother was a teacher.

When he was with George Olliver & The Soul Children, the band was in London, Ontario, where John's playing caught the attention of George Clinton, who was there with his band Parliament. Parliament's bass player couldn't get over the border and Clinton asked John to step in. At the end of the summer of 1971, Clinton brought him to Detroit, where they recorded America Eats Its Young, by Clinton's band Funkadelic. Clinton would have John back in 1974, to record the Parliament album Chocolate City.

=== Lou Reed, Alice Cooper, 1972–1983 ===
In 1973, Glan was called and asked if he'd like a ten-day job recording an album with Lou Reed. They recorded the album Sally Can't Dance, and spent the next four years touring and recording with Reed. Through Reed, John met the men who would become two of his other musical heroes, Steve Hunter and Dick Wagner, whom he credits for the quality of Reed's live albums, Rock 'n' Roll Animal and Lou Reed Live—he would play on both of their 1978 albums.

In 1975, Glan and John were asked to work (along with Hunter and Wagner) on an album that Alice Cooper was recording in Toronto. That album became Cooper's legendary Welcome to My Nightmare. They went on tour in support of it, and Glan and John would spend the next six years with Cooper, touring and recording his albums Lace and Whiskey and DaDa.

=== The Lincolns, 1979–present ===
In 1979, John founded his second R&B band, The Lincolns, which plays versions of R&B classics and some original tunes, mainly in clubs across Canada. In 1981, they released the album Take One; they released their second album, Funky Funky Funky in 1996. In the 1980s, the band opened for Robert Palmer, and was chosen to play at Wayne Gretzky's 1988 wedding. At a 2002 Toronto concert, Prince joined them on stage. In 2016, they toured Europe with a Tina Turner tribute show. As of 2021, John's son Jordan leads the band, which is considered one of North America's premiere R&B bands.

=== Solo career ===
As a solo artist, John has played and/or recorded with James Brown, Rory Block, Paul Shaffer, Pinetop Perkins, Jr. Wells, Mike Bloomfield, Brenda Russell, Dr. John, American Flyer, Paul Dean and Murray McLauchlan, among others.

== Film and television ==
In 1998, John appeared in the film Blues Brothers 2000 (and played on the soundtrack). In 2016, he was one of the stars of Sunnyvale Shoals, a 19-episode TV series about the roots of Soul and R&B. Also in 2016, he appeared on the 5 September Trailer Park Boys podcast Park After Dark.

== Personal life ==
John lives with his wife in the Toronto suburb of Mississauga; they have two sons. In 2019, he was given a stone on the Mississauga Music Walk of Fame.

== Discography ==
=== With Lou Reed ===
- Sally Can't Dance, Lou Reed, 1974, RCA Records
- Rock 'n' Roll Animal, Lou Reed, 1974, RCA Records
- Lou Reed Live in Stockholm 1974, Lou Reed, 1974, Independent
- Lou Reed Live, Lou Reed, 1975, RCA Records
- My Name is Lou, Lou Reed, 1977, Sweden, Moose Records, Unofficial Limited Edition
- Phantom Animal, Lou Reed, 1994, Gold Standard Records (recorded 1973)
- When Your Heart Is Made Out of Ice, Lou Reed, 2020, Easy Action Records (recorded 1975)

=== With Alice Cooper ===
- Welcome to My Nightmare, Alice Cooper, 1975, Atlantic Records
- Providence Nightmare, Alice Cooper, 1975, Unofficial Release
- Providence 1975, Alice Cooper, 1975, Unofficial Release
- The Alice Cooper Show, Alice Cooper, 1977, Warner Bros.
- Lace and Whiskey, Alice Cooper, 1977, Warner Bros.
- DaDa, Alice Cooper, 1983, Warner Bros.
- Mad House Rock, Alice Cooper, 1991. Unofficial Release, No Future Records.
- The Life and Crimes of Alice Cooper, Alice Cooper, 1999, Warner Bros., Rhino Entertainment
- King of Shock Rock, Alice Cooper, 2007, Breakdown Records
- Welcome to Alice Show, Alice Cooper, 2008 Japan, Breakdown Records

=== With George Clinton ===
- America Eats Its Young, Funkadelic, 1972, Westbound Records
- The Best of the Early Years Volume One, Funkadelic, 1972, Westbound Records
- Chocolate City, Parliament, 1975, Casablanca Records
- Tear the Roof Off 1974-1980, Parliament, 1993, Casablanca Records

=== With The Lincolns ===
- Take One, Prakash John & The Lincolns, 1981, Pacemaker Entertainment (Re-released 2008)
- Funky Funky Funky, The Lincolns, 1996, Pacemaker Entertainment

=== Other ===
- Bush, Bush, 1970, Dunhill Records
- Domenic Troiano, Domenic Troiano, 1972, Mercury Records (Later part of the collection The Toronto Sound)
- Charlee, Charlee, 1972, RCA Records
- They Don't Play Our Love Songs Anymore, Marilyn Jones, 1975, United Artists
- Rory Block, Rory Block, 1975, RCA Records
- Passing Time, Dwayne Ford & Bearfoot, 1975, Epic Records
- Word Called Love, Brian and Brenda Russell, 1976, The Rocket Record Company
- Spirit of a Woman, American Flyer, 1977 United Artists
- Swept Away, Steve Hunter, 1977, Atco Records
- Richard Wagner, Richard Wagner (Dick Wagner), 1978, Atlantic Records
- Free at Last, Jack Tobi, 1978, Canadian Broadcasting Corporation
- Quick as Silver, Vezi Tayyeb, 1980, Quantum Records
- Black Market, Changing of the Guard, 1981, El Mocambo Records
- Jimi B, Jimi B (Jimi Bertucci), 1981, A&M Records
- On Meil Venna Kätt?, Raul ja Ülo, 1981, Ususõnum Records
- Show Me the Way, Vangie, 1981, Rockingchair Productions.
- Windows, Murray McLauchlan, 1982, True North Records
- At Midnight, Harlow, 1983. G.r.a.f. Records
- Machine, Paul Dean, 1994, Strawberry Records
- To My Very Soul, Stu Heydon, 2006, Independent
- Revival, Johnny Reid, 2017, Halo Entertainment Group

=== Compilations ===
- New York Superstar, Lou Reed, 1978, Germany, RCA Records International
- Between Thought And Expression – The Lou Reed Anthology, Lou Reed, 1992, BMG Music
- Rock Ballads, 1993, France, Carrere Records
- Blues Brothers 2000 (Original Motion Picture Soundtrack), 1998, Universal Records
- Bondi Junction And Other Hits, Peter Foldy, 2003, Pacemaker Entertainment
- Gold, Parliament, 2005, Mercury Records
- The Studio Albums 1969-1983, Alice Cooper, 2015, Warner Bros.
- The RCA & Arista Album Collection, Lou Reed, 2016, Sony Music
- Welcome to My Nightmare Special Edition, Alice Cooper, 2017, Eagle Vision/Eagle Rock Entertainment, Universal Music
- Alone in His Nightmare Live 1975, Alice Cooper, 2017, Netherlands, Unofficial Release, Cult Legends
