= Bush (Canadian band) =

1970s Canadian rock band

- Origin: Toronto, Ontario, Canada
- Genres: Rock
- Years active: 1970–1971
- Label: RCA
- Members: Domenic Troiano; Roy Kenner; Hugh Sullivan; Pentti Glan; Prakash John

Bush was an early 1970s Canadian rock band. It evolved from the club act Mandala, which had a minor Canadian hit with the song "Love-Itis".

== History ==
Bush consisted of ex-Mandala bandmates Domenic Troiano (vocals, guitar), Roy Kenner (vocals), Hugh Sullivan (organ), Pentti Glan (drums), and Prakash John (vocals, bass). The group released a single eponymous album in 1970, on the RCA label in Canada and Dunhill in the US, and toured with label mates Steppenwolf and Three Dog Night. Three Dog Night released one of their songs, "I Can Hear You Calling" as the B-side of their successful single "Joy to the World". The song also appeared on Three Dog Night's Naturally album. Bush was short-lived as a band, but its jazz-influenced rock was influential in Canada.

Bush became newsworthy again in 1995, as the result of an intellectual property dispute with the British rock band Bush. As Troiano still owned the rights to that name, the British band was forced to release their albums in Canada under the name "Bush^{x}". In 1997, Troiano offered a deal in which the British band was allowed to use simply "Bush" in return for donations to the Starlight Foundation and the Canadian Music Therapy Fund.

== Subsequent careers ==
All of the band members continued in music after the breakup of Bush. Kenner and Troiano joined The James Gang, following the departure of Joe Walsh. They performed together on the albums Passin' Thru and Straight Shooter, after which Troiano left to join The Guess Who. Kenner stayed with The James Gang, which continued with lead guitarist Tommy Bolin for two further albums, Bang and Miami. John and Glan became session musicians, who also toured with Alice Cooper and Lou Reed. Troiano later maintained a solo career, which also included Kenner at various times. John later fronted the long-running Toronto-based rhythm and blues band, The Lincolns. In 2005, Domenic Troiano died aged 59, of prostate cancer.

== Discography ==
- Bush (1970)
