= Pentti Glan =

Finnish-Canadian drummer (1946–2017)

Pentti "Whitey" Glan
- Born: Pentti Glan; July 8, 1946; Finland
- Origin: Toronto, Ontario, Canada
- Died: November 7, 2017 (aged 71) Innisfil, Ontario, Canada
- Genres: Rock, hard rock, heavy metal, shock rock, Blues
- Occupation: Drummer
- Instrument: Drums
- Years active: 1964–2017
- Formerly of: Alice Cooper, Lou Reed, Bette Midler, Mandala, Bush, John Kay

Pentti "Whitey" Glan (July 8, 1946 – November 7, 2017) was a Finnish-Canadian rock drummer, best known for his work with Alice Cooper and Lou Reed.

== Musical career ==
Glan's first serious band was the Canadian soul band The Rogues (later called Mandala) which he formed with keyboardist Josef Chirowski and bassist Don Elliot; they had worked together in other bands like Whitey & The Roulettes (which also featured guitarist Mike McKenna). Mandala had their first hit single with "Opportunity" with original singer George Olliver, recorded at Chess Records.

In 1966 Glan played several shows with Mandala in Ontario and recorded the first two demo songs of his career ("I Can't Hold Out No Longer" and "I'll Make It Up To You"). Roy Kenner had replaced George Olliver. When they played their first shows in the USA they performed at the Whisky a Go Go. They recorded their only album Soul Crusade in 1968 which produced a hit single ("Loveitis") but they disbanded in 1969 after several line-up changes and poor album sales.

He formed another group called Bush in 1971 with Mandala bandmates Domenic Troiano, Roy Kenner and Prakash John. They released a self-titled album and toured with Steppenwolf, after which they disbanded.

Glan became a session drummer, playing on the first and second solo albums of Steppenwolf's John Kay. In 1974, Glan began touring with Lou Reed, playing on two live albums and one studio album. In 1975 Glan joined Alice Cooper for the recording of his first solo album Welcome To My Nightmare and subsequent tour, and later appeared on the live album The Alice Cooper Show. Glan toured with Alice Cooper from 1975 to 1979 during the Madhouse Tour, supporting Cooper's From the Inside album. He also appeared in the movie The Rose as the drummer of The Rose Band.

He died on November 7, 2017, of lung cancer at the age of 71.

== Partial discography ==
- 1968 - Mandala - Soul Crusade
- 1970 - Bush - Bush
- 1972 - John Kay - Forgotten Songs and Unsung Heroes
- 1972 - Domenic Troiano - Domenic Troiano
- 1973 - John Kay - My Sportin' Life
- 1974 - Lou Reed - Rock 'n' Roll Animal
- 1974 - Lou Reed - Sally Can't Dance
- 1974 - Anne Murray - Highly Prized Possession
- 1975 - Lou Reed - Lou Reed Live
- 1975 - Alice Cooper - Welcome to My Nightmare
- 1976 - Klaatu - 3:47 EST
- 1977 - Alice Cooper - The Alice Cooper Show
- 1977 - American Flyer - Spirit Of A Woman
- 1979 - Bette Midler - The Rose (film soundtrack)
- 1981 - Stella - Qué Nota!
- 1984 - David Wilcox - Bad Reputation
- 2007 - Downchild Blues Band - Come On In
- 2008 - Rex Mann - Northbound
