= James Gang Live in Concert =

Live in Concert

Live album by James Gang
- Released: September 1971
- Recorded: May 15, 1971
- Venues: Carnegie Hall, New York City
- Genres: Rock, hard rock
- Length: 43:44
- Label: ABC
- Producer: James Gang

James Gang chronology
| Thirds (1971) | Live in Concert (1971) | Straight Shooter (1972) |

Live in Concert is a live album by the James Gang, released in September 1971. It contains highlights of a May 15, 1971, performance at Carnegie Hall, New York City. This album is the last James Gang release to feature Joe Walsh as guitarist and vocalist and Bill Szymczyk as producer and engineer. The album reached Gold status in June 1972.

== Critical reception ==
Professional ratings
Review scores
| Source | Rating |
|---|---|
| AllMusic | 3/5 stars |
| Billboard | (favorable) |

Writing for AllMusic, critic Stephen Thomas Erlewine wrote the album "Live in Concert captures much of the energy of their live performances, with Joe Walsh's guitar solos catching fire on nearly every song. However, the record also makes it clear that he was beginning to outgrow the confines of the James Gang..."

== Track listing ==
All songs by Joe Walsh, except where noted.

| No. | Title | Writer(s) | Original album | Length |
|---|---|---|---|---|
| 1. | "Stop" | Jerry Ragovoy, Mort Shuman | Yer' Album | 4:05 |
| 2. | "You're Gonna Need Me" | Albert King | | 7:30 |
| 3. | "Take a Look Around" | | Yer' Album | 3:50 |
| 4. | "Tend My Garden" | | James Gang Rides Again | 3:45 |
| 5. | "Ashes, the Rain and I" | Dale Peters, Walsh | James Gang Rides Again | 2:40 |
| 6. | "Walk Away" | | Thirds | 3:30 |
| 7. | "Lost Woman" | Jeff Beck, Chris Dreja, Jim McCarty, Keith Relf, Paul Samwell-Smith | Yer' Album | 18:20 |

== Personnel ==
James Gang

- Joe Walsh – electric 6- (1, 2, 6, 7) and 12-string (5) guitars, vocals, Hammond B3 organ (3, 4)
- Dale Peters – bass guitar, vocals, percussion
- Jim Fox – drums, vocals, percussion, acoustic guitar

== Production ==
- James Gang: Producers
- Bill Szymczyk: Engineer

== Sales chart performance ==
| Year | Chart | Position |
|---|---|---|
| 1971 | Billboard 200 | 24 |
| 1971 | Canada | 25 |
