= Fret Fever =

Studio album by Domenic Troiano
- Released: 1979
- Recorded: 1978–1979
- Genre: Funk rock, soul, new wave, disco
- Label: Capitol (ST-11932)
- Producer: Domenic Troiano

Domenic Troiano chronology
Tricky (1973)	Fret Fever (1979)

Fret Fever (released under his last name of "Troiano") is the third solo release (and first for Capitol) by Italian/Canadian guitarist-singer/songwriter Domenic Troiano (having also done time in bands as diverse as James Gang & The Guess Who). Self-produced and released in 1979, it featured his biggest hit in the disco-flavored "We All Need Love" (lead vocal-Roy Kenner).

== Track listing ==
- All songs written & arranged by Domenic Troiano, except where noted.
1. "South American Run" 3:41 (Troiano, Roy Kenner)
2. "Ambush" 3:45
3. "We All Need Love" 3:55
4. "It's You" 3:14
5. "It's Raining, It's Raining" 3:26
6. "Give Me a Chance" 2:13
7. "Your Past" 3:44
8. "Fret Fever" 3:48
9. "Brains on the Floor" 4:01
10. "Victim of Circumstance" 3:38
11. "Achilles" 3:56
12. "The End" 0:45

== Personnel ==
- Domenic Troiano - lead vocals and backing vocals, acoustic and electric guitars
- Roy Kenner - lead vocals and backing vocals
- David Tyson - synthesizers, electric piano, additional percussions and backing vocals
- Bob Wilson - bass and backing vocals
- Paul DeLong - drums and timbals
- Bob Boyer, Dalbello, Eddie Schwartz, Fred Boyer, Colina Phillips, Shawne Jackson - backing vocals

== Production ==
- Produced by Domenic Troiano
- Reissue Producer: Warren Stewart
- Recorded & Mixed by Mike Jones, with recording assistance by Hugh Cooper
- Mastered by George Marino
