= Newborn (album) =

Studio album by James Gang
- Released: May 5, 1975
- Recorded: 1974–1975
- Genres: Rock, hard rock, country rock
- Length: 33:34
- Label: Atco
- Producer: Tom Dowd

James Gang chronology
Miami (1974)	Newborn (1975)	Jesse Come Home (1976)

Newborn is the eighth studio album by James Gang, released in 1975, and the only released on Atlantic Records. Guitarist Tommy Bolin and singer Roy Kenner had long since left the band, and were replaced by guitarist Richard Shack and vocalist Bubba Keith in time for Newborn's recording. This album is perhaps the most boogie-based James Gang release. It features a cover of the Elvis Presley classic "Heartbreak Hotel".

Both Newborn and its follow-up Jesse Come Home have been reissued on one CD by Wounded Bird Records.

The album cover artwork features a reproduction of Salvador Dalí's "Geopoliticus Child Watching the Birth of the New Man".

== Critical reception ==
Professional ratings
Review scores
Source	Rating
Allmusic	2/5 stars

Writing for Allmusic, critic Stephen Thomas Erlewine wrote of the album "The record was another collection of mediocre songs—a problem that plagued the band ever since the departure of Joe Walsh in 1971."

== Track listing ==
All songs by Bubba Keith and Richard Shack, except where noted.

Side one

1. "Merry-Go-Round" – 3:05
  - Bubba Keith - lead vocals, guitar
  - Richard Shack - guitars, backing vocals, guitar solo
  - Dale Peters - bass, backing vocals
  - Jim Fox - drums
  - David Briggs - organ
2. "Gonna Get By" (Bubba Keith, Mark Smith) – 3:59
  - Bubba Keith - lead vocals, acoustic guitar
  - Richard Shack - electric guitar, backing vocals
  - Dale Peters - bass, backing vocals
  - Jim Fox - drums
  - David Briggs - piano, organ
3. "Earthshaker" (Keith) – 3:48
  - Bubba Keith - lead vocals, guitar
  - Richard Shack - guitars, guitar solo
  - Dale Peters - bass
  - Jim Fox - drums
  - Tom Dowd - cacophony
  - Ken Hamann - synth-A
4. "All I Have" – 2:17
  - Bubba Keith - lead vocals
  - Richard Shack - guitar
  - Dale Peters - bass
5. "Watch It" (Keith) – 3:32
  - Bubba Keith - lead vocals, guitar
  - Richard Shack - guitars, guitar solo
  - Dale Peters - bass, cowbell
  - Jim Fox - drums

Side two

6. "Driftin' Dreamer" – 3:31
  - Bubba Keith - lead vocals, acoustic guitar
  - Richard Shack - electric guitar, backing vocals
  - Dale Peters - bass, backing vocals, tambourine
  - Jim Fox - drums, organ
7. "Shoulda' Seen Your Face" – 3:46
  - Bubba Keith - lead vocals, guitar
  - Richard Shack - guitars, guitar solo
  - Dale Peters - bass, triangle
  - Jim Fox - drums
8. "Come With Me" – 2:30
  - Bubba Keith - lead vocals
  - Richard Shack - guitar
  - Donny Brooks - harmonica
  - George Ricci - cello
  - Arif Mardin - cello and harmonica arrangements
9. "Heartbreak Hotel" (Mae Boren Axton & Tommy Durden) – 2:15
  - Bubba Keith - lead vocals, guitar
  - Richard Shack - guitars, guitar solo
  - Dale Peters - bass
  - Jim Fox - drums, piano
10. "Red Satin Lover" – 2:17
  - Bubba Keith - lead vocals, guitar
  - Richard Shack - guitars, guitar solo
  - Dale Peters - bass, backing vocals, tambourine
  - Jim Fox - drums
11. "Cold Wind" – 2:34
  - Bubba Keith - lead vocals, acoustic guitar
  - Richard Shack - electric guitar, guitar solo
  - Dale Peters - bass
  - Jim Fox - drums
  - Al Perkins - steel guitar
  - Tom Dowd - piano

== Personnel ==
- Bubba Keith – lead vocals, electric and acoustic guitars
- Richard Shack – electric guitars, backing vocals
- Dale Peters – bass, backing vocals, percussion
- Jim Fox – drums, organ, piano
- Al Perkins – steel guitar
- David Briggs – organ, piano
- Kenneth Hamann – synthesizer
- Don Brooks – harmonica
- George Ricci – cello

== Sales chart performance ==
Album - Billboard (United States)

Year	Chart	Position
1975	Billboard 200	109
