= Geopoliticus Child Watching the Birth of the New Man =

1943 painting by Salvador Dalí

- Artist: Salvador Dalí
- Year: 1943
- Medium: Oil on canvas
- Movement: Surrealism
- Dimensions: 44.5 cm × 52 cm (17.5 in × 20 in)
- Location: Salvador Dalí Museum; St Petersburg

Geopoliticus Child Watching the Birth of the New Man is a 1943 painting by Salvador Dalí. The painting was done during Dalí's stay in the United States from 1940 to 1948. It is said to be one of his most recognizable paintings. It is of a man scrambling out of an egg while an adult woman and child look on. The work is held at the Salvador Dalí Museum, in St. Petersburg, Florida.

Dalí provided some abbreviated, mysterious notes about the work: "Parachute, paranaissance, protection, cupola, placenta, Catholicism, egg, earthly distortion, biological ellipse. Geography changes its skin in historic germination."

== Subjects and symbolism ==
The egg is a common subject in Dalí's work. Early in his career, eggs commonly symbolized hope and love. However, Child Watching the Birth of the New Man and other later works mimics the egg as a Christian symbol of purity and perfection. Dalí uses the leaking yellow "yolk" of the egg to map the world onto the egg.

The man emerging from egg is the "New Man" referenced in the title, and the "Geopoliticus Child" can be seen crouching in the lower right-hand corner.

The New Man emerges from the egg where North America should be, breaking through the rising power of the US and resting his hand on Europe to support his emergence. South America and Africa are both enlarged relative to Europe, conveying the growing importance of the so-called "third world."

The draped cloth represents the placenta.

The androgynous figure who the Geopoliticus child holds on to is pointing at the New Man, showing the child the "new historical period it will represent."

== Cultural references ==
The painting was reproduced on the cover of the music album Newborn (1975) by James Gang.

== Provenance ==
1. Knoedler Gallery, New York
2. Stuart Art Gallery, Boston
3. Louis E. Stern
4. Richard Feignen Gallery, Chicago
5. E. and A. Reynolds Morse, Cleveland (Ohio)

== See also ==
- List of works by Salvador Dalí
