= Give Me a Chance =

Give Me a Chance may refer to:

- Give Me a Chance, a 1993 album by Solid

== Songs ==
- "Give Me a Chance" (Lay song), 2018
- "Give Me a Chance", by Amanda Falk
- "Give Me a Chance", by Black Tide from Light from Above
- "Give Me a Chance", by Bobby Valentino from Bobby Valentino
- "Give Me a Chance", by Brigitte Nielsen from I'm the One... Nobody Else
- "Give Me a Chance", by Danny! from Charm
- "Give Me a Chance", by Danny Diablo from International Hardcore Superstar
- "Give Me a Chance", by Domenic Troiano from Fret Fever
- "Give Me a Chance", by Dwele from W.ants W.orld W.omen
- "Give Me a Chance", by Jed Madela
- "Give Me a Chance", by John Spencer Blues Explosion from Acme
- "Give Me a Chance", by Los Bravos from Black Is Black
- "Give Me a Chance", by Meghan Trainor
- "Give Me a Chance", by Ngaire Fuata from Ngaire
- "Give Me a Chance", by Pablo Ruiz from Jamás
- "Give Me a Chance", by Paul Carrack from One Good Reason
- "Give Me a Chance", by Ric Segreto
- "Give Me a Chance", by Sharon Jones and the Dap-Kings from Dap Dippin' with Sharon Jones and the Dap-Kings
- "Give Me a Chance", by Supertramp from Some Things Never Change

== See also ==
- "Donne-moi une chance" (French for "give me a chance"), a song by Modern Times, Luxembourg's entry in Eurovision 1993
- "Giving Me a Chance", a song by Gotye from the album Making Mirrors
