= Funk 49 =

Song by James Gang

"Funk #49"

Single by James Gang

from the album James Gang Rides Again
- Released: 1970
- Recorded: 1969
- Studio: Record Plant (New York City)
- Genre: Hard rock; blues rock; funk rock
- Length: 3:54; 3:05 (single edit)
- Label: ABC
- Songwriters: Joe Walsh; Jim Fox; Dale Peters
- Producer: Bill Szymczyk

James Gang singles chronology
"Funk #48" (1969)	"Funk #49" (1970)	"Walk Away" (1971)

Audio
- "Funk #49 on YouTube

"Funk #49" is a song written by Joe Walsh, Jim Fox, and Dale Peters, and recorded by American hard rock band James Gang. The song featured as the first single off the group's second studio album James Gang Rides Again (1970). The song was a moderate success upon release, peaking at #59 on the Billboard Hot 100.

== Composition ==
"Funk #49" is 3:54 in length, though it only has two verses. Much of the song is instrumental, drawing from Joe Walsh's guitar, Dale Peters' bass work, and Jim Fox's drumming. The lyrics focus on a wild girlfriend the singer cannot tame. Most of the song is a vehicle for Walsh's guitar performance. The song got its title as a sequel to "Funk #48", a song from Yer' Album, their debut studio album.

Walsh explained the writing of the song, "I came up with the basic guitar lick, and the words never really impressed me intellectually, but they seemed to fit somehow. It was a real good example of how we put things together, bearing in mind that it was a three piece group, and I don't think that there was any overdubbing. The only thing we really added was the percussion middle part, which the three of us actually played, putting some parts on top of the drums, but that's the three piece James Gang, and that's the energy and kind of the symmetry we were all about."

Walsh would later record a "Funk #50", which was included on his eleventh and latest solo studio album, Analog Man (2012).
