= List of number-one singles of 1963 (Canada) =

The following is a list of the CHUM Chart number-one singles of 1963.

Issue date	Song	Artist	Reference
January 7	"From a Jack to a King"	Ned Miller	
January 14	"From a Jack to a King"	Ned Miller	
January 21	"Walk Right In"	The Rooftop Singers	
January 28	"Walk Right In"	The Rooftop Singers	
February 4	"Hey Paula"	Paul & Paula	
February 11	"Hey Paula"	Paul & Paula	
February 18	"Hey Paula"	Paul & Paula	
February 25	"Rhythm of the Rain"	The Cascades	
March 4	"Rhythm of the Rain"	The Cascades	
March 11	"Walk Like a Man"	The Four Seasons	
March 18	"The End of the World"	Skeeter Davis	
March 25	"He's So Fine"	The Chiffons	
April 1	"He's So Fine"	The Chiffons	
April 8	"He's So Fine"	The Chiffons	
April 15	"I Will Follow Him"	Little Peggy March	
April 22	"I Will Follow Him"	Little Peggy March	
April 29	"I Will Follow Him"	Little Peggy March	
May 6	"I Will Follow Him"	Little Peggy March	
May 13	"Summer Holiday"	Cliff Richard	
May 20	"Summer Holiday"	Cliff Richard	
May 27	"Summer Holiday"	Cliff Richard	
June 3	"It's My Party"	Lesley Gore	
June 10	"It's My Party"	Lesley Gore	
June 17	"It's My Party"	Lesley Gore	
June 24	"Charlena"	Richie Knight and the Mid-Knights	
July 1	"Charlena"	Richie Knight and the Mid-Knights	
July 8	"Needles and Pins"	Jackie DeShannon	
July 15	"Needles and Pins"	Jackie DeShannon	
July 22	"(You're the) Devil in Disguise"	Elvis Presley	
July 29	"(You're the) Devil in Disguise"	Elvis Presley	
August 5	"Just One Look"	Doris Troy	
August 12	"Just One Look"	Doris Troy	
August 19	"Just One Look"	Doris Troy	
August 26	"Mockingbird"	Inez Foxx	
September 2	"Mockingbird"	Inez Foxx	
September 9	"Blue Velvet"	Bobby Vinton	
September 16	"Blue Velvet"	Bobby Vinton	
September 23	"Blue Velvet"	Bobby Vinton	
September 30	"Blue Velvet"	Bobby Vinton	
October 7	"Blue Velvet"	Bobby Vinton	
October 14	"Sugar Shack"	Jimmy Gilmer and the Fireballs	
October 21	"Sugar Shack"	Jimmy Gilmer and the Fireballs	
October 28	"Sugar Shack"	Jimmy Gilmer and the Fireballs	
November 4	"Sugar Shack"	Jimmy Gilmer and the Fireballs	
November 11	"Sugar Shack"	Jimmy Gilmer and the Fireballs	
November 18	"Sugar Shack"	Jimmy Gilmer and the Fireballs	
November 25	"It's All in the Game"	Cliff Richard	
December 2	"Dominique"	The Singing Nun	
December 9	"Dominique"	The Singing Nun	
December 16	"Dominique"	The Singing Nun	
December 23	"Dominique"	The Singing Nun	
December 30	"Louie Louie"	The Kingsmen	

== See also ==
- 1962 in music
