= Lou Reed Live =

Live album by Lou Reed
- Released: March 1975
- Recorded: 21 December 1973
- Venue: Howard Stein's Academy of Music, New York City
- Genre: Glam rock
- Length: 37:49
- Label: RCA Victor
- Producer: Steve Katz

Lou Reed chronology
Sally Can't Dance (1974)	Lou Reed Live (1975)	Metal Machine Music (1975)

Professional ratings
Review scores
Source	Rating
Chicago Tribune	2/4 stars
Christgau's Record Guide	B−
Rolling Stone	(favorable)

Lou Reed Live is a live album by American musician Lou Reed, released in 1975. It was recorded at the same concert as Rock 'n' Roll Animal; on December 21, 1973, at Howard Stein's Academy of Music in New York. It features three songs from Transformer, one song from The Velvet Underground & Nico (Reed's former band's debut album) and two songs from Berlin. Between this album and the remastered Rock 'n' Roll Animal, the entire show has been released, albeit in a different order than the original concert setlist.

In 2003, RCA/BMG re-issued this album under their "Extended Versions" series. The title was changed to reflect this, but the contents remained unchanged.

This live album's stereo mix differs from its counterpart "Rock 'n' Roll Animal" in that guitarist Steve Hunter is heard on the left channel, and Dick Wagner is on the right; this arrangement is reversed on Rock 'n' Roll Animal.

After the last song ("Sad Song") fades to crowd noise, someone can be heard shouting "Lou Reed sucks!".

== Track listing ==
All tracks composed by Lou Reed

Side one

1. "Vicious" – 5:55
2. "Satellite of Love" – 6:03
3. "Walk on the Wild Side" – 4:51

Side two

1. "I'm Waiting for the Man" – 3:38
2. "Oh, Jim" – 10:40
3. "Sad Song" – 7:32

== Personnel ==
Musicians

- Lou Reed – vocals
- Steve Hunter – guitars
- Dick Wagner – guitar, vocal
- Prakash John – bass, vocals
- Pentti "Whitey" Glan – drums, percussion
- Ray Colcord - keyboards
- Rob Hegel — background vocals ("Sad Song" only)

Production and artwork

- Gus Mossler - engineer
- Bruce Somerfeld, George Semkiw - production assistance
- Oliviero Toscani - cover photography

== Charts ==
Chart(1975)	Peak Position
Australia (Kent Music Report)	42
Dutch Album Chart	4
