= Walk Away (James Gang song) =

James Gang song

Single by James Gang

from the album Thirds
- Released: 1971
- Recorded: 1970
- Genre: Hard rock; funk rock
- Length: 3:32
- Label: ABC
- Songwriter: Joe Walsh
- Producers: James Gang; Bill Szymczyk

James Gang singles chronology
| "Funk #49" (1970) | "Walk Away" (1971) | "Midnight Man" (1971) |

"Walk Away" is a song written by Joe Walsh and recorded by American hard rock band James Gang, being featured as the first single from the group's studio album, Thirds (1971). The song peaked at No. 51 on the Billboard Hot 100.

== Composition ==
"Walk Away" is a combination of hard rock and funk, with some influence from soul music. Walsh's guitar work incorporates different types of distortion, including slide guitar. The lyrics are about the ending of a relationship.

== Release and critical reception ==
The song peaked at No. 51 on the Billboard Hot 100 on July 24, 1971. The song was generally well-reviewed by critics. Billboard characterized it as a "good rhythm item with [a] strong vocal workout" and said that the production was "superb". Cashbox wrote that the song's "thundering instrumental work, fine rhythmic excitement and an overall solidity should make top forties aware of this side quickly." Allmusic's Matthew Greenwald called it "one of the most realized James Gang songs and recordings" and that Walsh's guitar "creates a universe of hard rock virtuosity."

== Other versions ==
A live version of the song was included on the album James Gang Live in Concert, having been recorded at the band's first performance at Carnegie Hall in 1971. The Eagles, a band that Joe Walsh joined after the James Gang, have performed the song at concerts. Walsh's live cover reached #105 on Billboard in 1976. The band Phish frequently plays the song live and on April 18, 2026, at the Sphere in Las Vegas, the band performed it because Joe Walsh was in attendance.

== Charts ==
James Gang

| Chart (1971) | Peak position |
|---|---|
| Canada Top Singles (RPM) | 31 |
| US Billboard Hot 100 | 51 |
| US Cashbox Top 100 | 29 |
| US Record World Top 100 | 41 |

Joe Walsh

| Chart (1976) | Peak position |
|---|---|
| US Billboard Hot 100 | 105 |
