= Thirds (album) =

Studio album by James Gang
- Released: April 1971
- Recorded: Fall 1970
- Studio: Record Plant, Los Angeles; Cleveland Recording Company, Cleveland; Hit Factory, New York City
- Genre: Hard rock
- Length: 36:02
- Label: ABC
- Producer: James Gang & Bill Szymczyk

James Gang chronology
James Gang Rides Again (1970)	Thirds (1971)	James Gang Live in Concert (1971)

Thirds is the third studio album by the American rock band James Gang. The album was released in mid 1971, on the label ABC Records. It is the last studio album featuring Joe Walsh. "Walk Away" was released as a single, making the Top 40 on at least one national chart, reaching #51 on the Billboard Hot 100, the best placement of a James Gang single. The album reached Gold status in July 1972.

On the liner notes to the LP version of this 1971 album, Joe Walsh is credited with "guitar, vocals, and train wreck", the latter for his work on the song "Walk Away" as a wry commentary on the multi-tracked, cascading lead guitars that clash as the song fades out.

The Walsh period of the band came to a close with the release of the next album James Gang Live in Concert.

== Critical reception ==
Professional ratings
Review scores
Source	Rating
AllMusic	4/5 stars

Writing for AllMusic, critic William Ruhlman wrote the album "though Thirds quickly earned a respectable chart position and eventually went gold, it was not the commercial breakthrough that might have been expected."

Billboard's review stated: "The James Gang has another good one here, another set scoring artistically and slated to score commercially. This hot trio has solid material, such as "Walk Away," country-flavored material such as "Dreamin' In The Country," and other top material, including "Midnight Man." "White Man/Black Man" is another winner." John Mendelsohn in Rolling Stone was equivocal stating "By no exertion of the imagination are James Gang the greatest rock and roll band ever to walk the face of the earth or anything... but they are capable of some nice little treats every now and again." Mendelsohn conversely called "White Man/Black Man" "a real no-two-ways-about-it embarrassment in the form of an overproduced plea for Greater Understanding between the races so that we can all Live Together."

== Track listing ==
Side one

1. "Walk Away" – (Joe Walsh) – 3:32
  - Joe Walsh – guitar, vocals, "train wreck"
  - Dale Peters – bass
  - Jim Fox – drums
2. "Yadig?" – (Peters, Fox, Walsh) – 2:30
  - Joe Walsh – guitar, electric piano
  - Dale Peters – upright bass
  - Jim Fox – drums, vibraphone
3. "Things I Could Be" – (Fox) – 4:18
  - Jim Fox – drums, vocals, organ
  - Joe Walsh – guitar
  - Dale Peters – bass
4. "Dreamin' in the Country" – (Peters) – 2:57
  - Dale Peters – bass, vocals
  - Joe Walsh – guitar, pedal steel guitar
  - Jim Fox – drums, tack piano
5. "It's All the Same" – (Walsh) – 4:10
  - Joe Walsh – guitar, vocals, piano
  - Dale Peters – bass
  - Jim Fox – drums

Side two

6. "Midnight Man" – (Walsh) – 3:28
  - Joe Walsh – guitar, lead vocals
  - Dale Peters – bass, backing vocals
  - Jim Fox – drums
  - Bob Webb – backing vocals
  - Mary Sterpka – backing vocals, lead vocals on the third chorus
7. "Again" – (Walsh) – 4:04
  - Joe Walsh – guitar, vocals, electric piano, violin arrangements
  - Dale Peters – bass
  - Jim Fox – drums
8. "White Man / Black Man" – (Peters) – 5:39
  - Dale Peters – bass, lead vocals
  - Joe Walsh – guitar, piano
  - Jim Fox – drums
  - The Sweet Inspirations – backing vocals
9. "Live My Life Again" – (Fox) – 5:26
  - Jim Fox – drums, pianos
  - Joe Walsh – guitar, vocals
  - Dale Peters – bass

== Personnel ==
=== James Gang ===
- Joe Walsh – guitars, vocals, acoustic and electric pianos, pedal steel guitar, sound effects, "train wreck" (noted on the album cover; this reference is to the multiple cascading and heavily distorted guitars at the end of "Walk Away")
- Dale Peters – bass guitar, vocals, upright bass
- Jim Fox – drums, vocals, percussion, piano, organ, vibraphone

=== Guest musicians ===
- Bob Webb – backing vocals on "Midnight Man"
- Tom Baker – horns
- Mary Sterpka – backing vocals on "Midnight Man"
- The Sweet Inspirations – backing vocals on "White Man/Black Man"

=== Production ===
- James Gang & Bill Szymczyk – producers
- Bill Szymczyk – engineer
- Kenneth Hamann – engineer
- Eddie Youngblood – engineer
- Dale Peters & Jim Fox – reissue liner notes
- Tom Wilkes – cover design
- Tom Wright – cover design, photography

== Charts ==
Chart (1971)	Position
Australian (Kent Music Report)	42
Billboard Pop Albums	27
