= Rock 'n' Roll Animal =

Live album by Lou Reed
- Released: February 1974
- Recorded: December 21, 1973
- Venues: Howard Stein's Academy of Music, New York City
- Genres: Glam rock; hard rock; heavy metal
- Length: 40:32 (original); 48:12 (remaster)
- Label: RCA Victor
- Producers: Steve Katz; Lou Reed

Lou Reed chronology
Berlin (1973)	Rock 'n' Roll Animal (1974)	Sally Can't Dance (1974)

Singles from Rock 'n' Roll Animal
- 1. "Sweet Jane (Live)" Released: April 1974

Rock 'n' Roll Animal is a live album by American musician Lou Reed, released in February 1974 by RCA Records. In its original form, it features five songs, four of which were initially recorded by the Velvet Underground. Reed's band included Pentti Glan (drums), Prakash John (bass), Ray Colcord (keyboards), and Dick Wagner and Steve Hunter (guitars). The two guitarists would later form the basis of the first Alice Cooper solo band, beginning on Welcome to My Nightmare, which also features Glan and John.

The album was recorded live on December 21, 1973, at Howard Stein's Academy of Music in New York City. A sleeper hit, it peaked at No. 26 in the UK and No. 45 on the US Billboard 200 album chart during a 28-week stay before earning Reed's first RIAA gold certification in 1978.

== Background ==
Paul Nelson of Rolling Stone magazine was in attendance that night. Writing about Rock 'n' Roll Animal and its sequel, Lou Reed Live, which were both recorded at the same show, he recalled:

As it happens, I had seen Reed and a mediocre pickup band at Lincoln Center some months earlier in his first New York non-Velvets appearance and he was tragic in every sense of the word. So, at the Academy, I didn't expect much and when his new band came out and began to play spectacular, even majestic, rock & roll, management's strategy for the evening became clear: Elevate the erratic and unstable punkiness of the centerpiece into punchy, swaggering grandeur by using the best arrangements, sound and musicians that money could buy; the trimmings, particularly guitarists Dick Wagner and Steve Hunter, were awesome enough so that if Reed were merely competent, the concert would be a success. And it was, as one can judge from the resultant albums. The band does not emulate the violent, hypnotic, dope-trance staccato power and subway lyricism of the Velvet Underground, but rather opts for a hard, clean, clear, near-royal Mott the Hoople/Eric Clapton ("Layla") opulence and Reed sings out most of the songs in his effective street-talk style. Animal, coming first, naturally contains the best performances ("Intro/Sweet Jane", "White Light/White Heat", the first half of "Rock 'n' Roll").

== Musical style and reception ==
Professional ratings
Review scores
Source	Rating
AllMusic	4/5 stars
Chicago Tribune	2.5/4 stars
Christgau's Record Guide	A−
Overdose	A
The Rolling Stone Album Guide	4/5 stars
Spin Alternative Record Guide	7/10
Uncut	4/5 stars

The music of Rock 'n' Roll Animal has been described as glam rock, hard rock, and heavy metal. Rolling Stone editor Timothy Ferris described Rock 'n' Roll Animal as "a record to be played loud", continuing: "As background music it isn't much, but powered up on a strong system loud enough to make enemies a quarter-mile away, Rock 'n' Roll Animal... is, well, very fine."

Paul Morley, writing in NME in 1979, said, "Rock 'n' Roll Animal and Lou Reed Live were the ultimate insults, Reed wrecking the rare beauty and affirmation of his greatest songs by turning them into cliché ridden hack heavy metal mutations."

Reviewing in Christgau's Record Guide: Rock Albums of the Seventies (1981), Robert Christgau said, "At its best, Reed's live music brings the Velvets into the arena in a clean redefinition of heavy, thrilling without threatening to stupefy. 'Lady Day,' the slow one here, would pass for uptempo at many concerts, the made-in-Detroit guitars of Steve Hunter and Dick Wagner mesh naturally with the unnatural rhythms, and Reed shouts with no sacrifice of wit. I could do without Hunter's showboating 'Introduction,' and I've always had my reservations about 'Heroin,' but this is a live album with a reason for living."

== Re-releases ==
A remastered version was released on CD in 2000. It featured two tracks not included on the original LP or 1990 CD release.

Further excerpts from the same concert were released in 1975 as Lou Reed Live (between the remastered Rock 'n' Roll Animal and Lou Reed Live the entire show has been released, albeit in a different order than the original concert). The stereo mix on Rock 'n' Roll Animal isolates guitarist Steve Hunter on the right channel, and Dick Wagner on the left; this arrangement is reversed on Lou Reed Live.

== Track listing ==
All tracks are written by Lou Reed, except where noted.

Side one
No.	Title	Writer(s)	Length
1.	"Intro/Sweet Jane"	Steve Hunter; Reed	7:55
2.	"Heroin"		13:05

Side two
No.	Title	Length
3.	"White Light/White Heat"	5:15
4.	"Lady Day"	4:00
5.	"Rock 'n' Roll"	10:15

Remastered release
No.	Title	Length
1.	"Intro/Sweet Jane"	7:48
2.	"Heroin"	13:12
3.	"How Do You Think It Feels"	3:41
4.	"Caroline Says I"	4:06
5.	"White Light/White Heat"	4:55
6.	"Lady Day"	4:05
7.	"Rock 'n' Roll"	10:21

== Personnel ==
Adapted from the Rock 'n' Roll Animal liner notes.

- Lou Reed – vocals
- Steve Hunter – guitar
- Dick Wagner – guitar
- Prakash John – bass
- Pentti "Whitey" Glan – drums
- Ray Colcord – keyboards

Production

- Steve Katz – producer
- Lou Reed – producer
- Gus Mossler – engineer
- Bruce Somerfeld – production assistance
- Ralph Moss – production assistance
- Acy Lehman – art direction
- DeWayne Dalrymple – photography

== Charts ==
Chart (1974)	Peak position
Australian Albums (Kent Music Report)	20
UK Albums (Official Charts)	26
US Billboard 200	45

== Certifications ==
Region	Certification	Certified units/sales
France (SNEP)	Gold	100,000^{*}
United States (RIAA)	Gold	500,000^{^}
^{*} Sales figures based on certification alone.^{^} Shipments figures based on certification alone.
