= The Mid-Knights =

The Mid-Knights, also known as Richie Knight and the Mid-Knights, was a Canadian rhythm and blues band, active in the 1960s. Part of the Toronto Sound scene of that era, the band are best remembered for their single "Charlena", which was a number-one hit on the CHUM Chart for two weeks in 1963.

== Background ==
The "Mid-Knights" band was formed and named in 1959 by saxophonist and poet James Leo Donoghue. His close friend from De La Salle "Oaklands" College, Toronto, George Semkiw, guitarist, joined him, followed by Jim Gwilliams on drums, and guitarist John McCanliss. Richard Hubbard later joined the band as vocalist and Barry Lloyd was added at the piano where he later switched to Organ. The band was popular and successful from the start, playing at dance halls in Toronto and surrounding towns. In 1961, Donoghue submitted a tape of the Mid-Knights playing "Summertime" to jazz pianist Oscar Petersen's ASCM (Advanced School of Contemporary Music) and won a partial scholarship. He quit Grade 13 at TCI (Thistletown Collegiate Institute) to attend the ASCM. At this time the "Mid-Knights" band was playing on weekends only as most of the musicians were still in high school. After a brief time at Petersen's school, due to a lack of finances, Donoghue had to leave his band and the ASCM and join a Canadian band working full-time in Michigan. Under the stewardship of Semkiw the "Mid-Knights" band went on to ever increasing success, ultimately branding itself "Richie Knight and the Mid-Knights", undergoing changes in musicians over the years.

Donoghue's poetry appears in Anvil Blood, York University, Edited by Irving Layton; also in the 1979 anthology Childhood and Youth in Canadian Literature, published by The Macmillan Company of Canada, Edited by M. G. Hesse, a resource book used in Canadian high schools during the 1980s.

== Career ==
=== 1950s to 1960s ===
By late 1961 the "Mid-Knights" had added saxophonist Mike Brough, bassist Doug Chappell and drummer Barry Stein, comprising the lineup who would be featured on "Charlena". The song was a cover of a 1961 single by the Los Angeles R&B group The Sevilles, although the Mid-Knights' recording was significantly more successful. They were the first Canadian band to have a #1 hit on the Canadian charts.

The band recorded the followup single "The Joke" in late 1963, following which Lloyd left the band and was replaced by Ray Reeves. The band released a number of further singles between 1963 and 1966, although none were as successful as "Charlena". Brough and Hubbard left the band in 1966, and were replaced by Richard Bell on keyboards and Richard Newell on vocals. They changed their name at this time to The Mid-Knights.

Bell stayed with the band for only a short time before leaving to join Ronnie Hawkins's band. The band then added Dave Stilwell and Rick Cairns on trumpet, Jerry Shymansky on sax, Mark Smith on trombone and Bill Pinkerton on drums, recording one further single, "Soul Man", before Newell left in 1968 to join Hawkins's band. He was replaced by vocalists Frank Querci and Karen Titko; this final lineup recorded several songs, but none were released as singles before the band broke up.

The group along with Buckstone Hardware and The Five Shy appeared at Toronto's El Zorro discotheque on July 25, 1969.

== Later years ==
The second wave of band members played a reunion show in 2013 to celebrate the 50th anniversary of "Charlena" topping the charts.

== Discography ==
- "Charlena"/"You’ve Got The Power" (1963) (#1 CAN)
- "The Joke"/"My Kind of Love" (1964)
- "Homework"/"Come Back, Try Me" (1964)
- "Think It Over"/"You Hurt Me" (1965)
- "Packin’ Up"/"I’ll Go Crazy" (1965)
- "One Good Reason"/My Kind of Love" (1965) (#33 CAN)
- "That’s Alright"/"Work Song" (1966) (#41 CAN)
- "Soul Man"/"Somebody Somewhere Needs You" (1968, as The Mid-Knights)
