= Jesse Come Home =

Studio album by James Gang
- Released: February 7, 1976
- Recorded: December 1975
- Studios: Criteria (Miami, Florida); Cleveland Recording Company (Cleveland, Ohio)
- Genres: Rock, hard rock
- Length: 31:02
- Label: Atco
- Producer: Howard & Ron Albert

James Gang chronology
Newborn (1975)	Jesse Come Home (1976)

Jesse Come Home is the ninth and final studio album by James Gang, released in 1976. This album is the only one recorded with lead guitarist Bob Webb and keyboardist Phil Giallombardo (Giallombardo had been in an early lineup of the band but he had left prior to the recording of their first album). The title Jesse Come Home refers to one of the band's namesakes, Jesse James. The band broke up in 1977, though they have reunited with classic bandmate Joe Walsh several times since then.

Wounded Bird Records has released Jesse Come Home and its predecessor Newborn together on one compact disc.

== Critical reception ==
Professional ratings
Review scores
Source	Rating
Allmusic	2/5 stars

Writing for Allmusic, critic Stephen Thomas Erlewine said that Jesse Come Home "was the James Gang's final album, and it's not too difficult to see why. Ignoring the group's continuing failure to write strong songs, the main problem of the album lies in the bland, uninspired playing of the entire group."

== Track listing ==
1. "I Need Love" (Phil Giallombardo) – 3:17
2. "Another Year" (Bob Webb) – 3:59
3. "Feelin' Alright" (Giallombardo, Dale Peters, Jim Fox, Webb) – 3:26
4. "Peasant Song" (Giallombardo) – 3:56
5. "Hollywood Dream" (Webb) – 3:12
6. "Love Hurts" (Andrew Gold) – 3:29
7. "Pick Up the Pizzas" (Webb) – 2:30
8. "Stealin' the Show" (Webb) – 3:58
9. "When I Was a Sailor" (Giallombardo) – 6:46

== Personnel ==
- Bob Webb – guitars, lead (2, 7, 8) and backing vocals
- Phil Giallombardo – keyboards, lead (1, 3–5, 6, 9) and backing vocals
- Dale Peters – bass guitar, backing vocals
- Jim Fox – drums
- Nelson Pedron – percussion

== Charts ==
Year	Chart	Position
1976	Billboard 200	-
