= Shawne Jackson =

- Occupation: Musician
- Instrument: Vocals
- Labels: Playboy Records, RCA Victor, Quality Records, El Mocambo, Loose End Records
- Formerly of: The Majestics, Sweet Blindness, The Hollywood Vampires

Shawne Jackson is a Canadian singer and songwriter.

She had a Canadian Top 10 hit in 1974 with "Just As Bad As You". During her career she has provided the voice for Teacher Harriet in Daniel Tiger's Neighborhood, contributed backing vocals on "I'm A W.O.M.A.N." for Lydia Taylor, backing vocals on For Those Who Think Young by Rough Trade, backing vocals on the Alice Cooper Goes to Hell album by Alice Cooper, backing vocals on Fret Fever by Domenic Troiano. She was also nominee for the 1976 Juno Award for Breakthrough Artist of the Year.

== Early life ==
She is the great-granddaughter of Albert Jackson, Canada's first Black letter carrier.

During the late 1960s, Shawne and her brother Jay Jackson were the lead singers in The Majestics.

== Career ==
In 1974, she was backed by a band called West which included Paul Sanderson who would later become a leading entertainment lawyer in Canada. The group auditioned for the management company, Magic Management who took them along with the group Truck. It was via Magic Management that they ended up auditioning for Jackson who at that time was Domenic Troiano's girlfriend. West backed her for three months and then she had her hit "Just As Bad As You". By that time she had formed her own backing band. West broke up that year.

In May, 1974, "Just As Bad As You" was released. The A side was composed by Domenic Troiano. The B side, "He May Be Your Man" she co-wrote with Troiano. Both sides were produced by Troiano and Keith Olsen. On May 28 a successful reception was held for her at The Generator in Toronto with the help from Quality Records. The single got to #10 in Canada in June. It also got to #98 on the US R&B chart. The Cash Box international bestsellers, Canada chart recorded it at #6 just ahead of the "Time To Cry" single by Don Goodwin in the June 15 issue. Also in June, with her single doing well in Canada, she was touring with the group Sweet Blindness.

The August 9, 1975, issue of Billboard mentioned that Jackson was working on a follow-up to "Just As Bad As You". It also mentioned the side activities of Dominic Troiano who was then part of the new Guess Who line up. He had recently finished producing a session for Jackson.

By February 14th, her single "Get Out of the Kitchen" was at #10 in The Cash Box international bestsellers chart.

It was noted by Billboard in the December 11, 1976, issue that "Just As Bad As You" had been reissued by Quality Records as a first in a series of Playboy Gold reissues.

== Personal life ==
She was married to Domenic Troiano who produced her hit "Just As Bad As You". He died in 2005 from Cancer.

== Filmography ==
Shawne Jackson television credits
Year	Title	Role	Notes
1990	Counterstrike	Yvonne	Episode: "Regal Connection" (S1.E18)
2012–2018	Daniel Tiger's Neighborhood	Teacher Harriet (voice)	49 episodes
