= Miami (James Gang album) =

Studio album by James Gang
- Released: July 1974
- Recorded: 1974
- Studios: Criteria (Miami, Florida)
- Genre: Hard rock
- Length: 32:37
- Label: Atco
- Producers: James Gang, Tom Dowd

James Gang chronology
Bang (1973)	Miami (1974)	Newborn (1975)

Miami is the seventh studio album by James Gang, released in 1974.

This album is the last with lead guitarist Tommy Bolin before he left to join Deep Purple. The front cover is a black version of their second album, James Gang Rides Again with the new title and a pink flamingo added at the bottom.

== Critical reception ==
Professional ratings
Review scores
Source	Rating
Allmusic	3/5 stars

Writing for Allmusic, critic Stephen Thomas Erlewine wrote of the album "Again, there was a noticeable lack of memorable songs, but Miami is worthwhile for guitar aficionados."

== Track listing ==
All songs by Tommy Bolin, except where noted.

1. "Cruisin' Down the Highway" (Bolin, Dale Peters) – 3:16
2. "Do It (The Way You Do It)" (Bolin, Roy Kenner) – 3:38
3. "Wildfire" (Bolin, John Tesar) – 3:30
4. "Sleepwalker" (Bolin, Tesar) – 4:01
5. "Miami Two-Step" (Bolin, Peters, Jim Fox) – 1:32
6. "Praylude" – 2:33
7. "Red Skies" – 3:27
8. "Spanish Lover" (Bolin, Jeff Cook) – 3:43
9. "Summer Breezes" – 2:40
10. "Head Above the Water" (Bolin, Peters) – 4:18

== Personnel ==
James Gang

- Roy Kenner – lead and backing vocals
- Tommy Bolin – guitars; lead vocals on "Spanish Lover"
- Dale Peters – bass, backing vocals, fuzz bass, percussion
- Jimmy "Jim" Fox – drums, backing vocals, percussion, keyboards

Additional musicians

- Albhy Galuten – synthesizer on "Head Above the Water"

== Charts ==
Chart (1974)	Peak position
US Billboard 200	97
