= Straight Shooter (James Gang album) =

Studio album by James Gang
- Released: May 31, 1972
- Recorded: Early 1972
- Studios: Quadrafonic Sound (Nashville, Tennessee)
- Genres: Rock, hard rock
- Length: 35:15
- Labels: ABC, Probe
- Producer: James Gang

James Gang chronology
James Gang Live in Concert (1971)	Straight Shooter (1972)	Passin' Thru (1972)

Straight Shooter is the fourth studio album by James Gang, which was released in July 1972 on ABC Records in the US and Probe Records in the UK. This is the first James Gang album recorded after their guitarist/keyboardist/vocalist Joe Walsh left the band to form the band Barnstorm. The remaining members, Dale Peters (bass guitar and backing vocals) and Jim Fox (drums and organ) were joined on this album by ex-Bush singer Roy Kenner and guitarist Domenic Troiano. Bush, whose lone album was released in the United States by ABC's subsidiary label Dunhill Records, had broken up at about the same time as Walsh left the James Gang, so Kenner's and Troiano's joining Peters and Fox effectively merged the remnants of the two bands.

== Track listing ==
All songs by Roy Kenner and Domenic Troiano, except where noted.

No.	Title	Writer(s)	Length
1.	"Madness"		3:13
2.	"Kick Back Man"		4:51
3.	"Get Her Back Again"	Troiano	2:45
4.	"Looking for My Lady"		2:53
5.	"Getting Old"	Troiano	3:43
6.	"I'll Tell You Why"	Dale Peters, Troiano	3:53
7.	"Hairy Hypochondriac"	Kenner, Peters, Troiano	2:57
8.	"Let Me Come Home"	Peters, Troiano	4:59
9.	"My Door Is Open"		5:55

== Personnel ==
- Roy Kenner – lead vocals (all but 5), percussion
- Domenic Troiano – guitars, backing and lead (5) vocals
- Dale Peters – bass guitar, backing vocals, percussion
- Jim Fox – drums

Additional personnel

- Sheldon Kurland – violin
- Glen Spreen – strings

Engineering

- Gene Eichelberger – engineering, remixing

Cover artwork

- Jim Flournoy Holmes – cover artwork
- David Powell – cover artwork

== Charts ==
Chart (1972)	Peak position
US Billboard 200	58
Canada RPM 100 Albums	39
