= Sally Can't Dance =

Studio album by Lou Reed
- Released: September 1974
- Recorded: 18 March – 26 April 1974
- Studios: Electric Lady Studios (Greenwich Village, New York City)
- Genre: Rock
- Length: 32:58
- Label: RCA Victor
- Producers: Steve Katz; Lou Reed

Lou Reed chronology
Rock 'n' Roll Animal (1974)	Sally Can't Dance (1974)	Lou Reed Live (1975)

Professional ratings
Review scores
Source	Rating
AllMusic	2/5 stars
Chicago Tribune	1/4 stars
Christgau's Record Guide	B+
Tom Hull	C+

Sally Can't Dance is the fourth solo studio album by American rock musician Lou Reed, released in September 1974 by RCA Records. Steve Katz and Reed produced the album. It remains Reed's highest-charting album in the United States, having peaked at #10 in October 1974 during a 14-week stay on the Billboard 200 album chart, the album "returns to the basics of rock". It is also the first solo Lou Reed album not to feature any songs originally recorded by Reed's earlier band, the Velvet Underground, as well as the first of Reed's solo studio albums to be recorded in the United States (Reed's previous three albums were all recorded in the United Kingdom). The album art was designed by noted Fillmore and Broadway poster artist David Edward Byrd and was one of the few album covers he ever designed.

== Background ==
Aside from the title song, Sally Can't Dance includes "N.Y. Stars" (in which Reed pokes fun at "fourth-rate imitators" who tried to impress him by copying his style), "Kill Your Sons" (a reflection of his stay in a psychiatric hospital during his teen years, at his parents' insistence), and "Billy," about the fate of a schoolmate with more "normal" ambitions than he'd had. The latter track reunited Reed with erstwhile Velvet Underground bandmate Doug Yule, playing bass guitar. According to an interview with Yule, the call from Reed was "out of the blue", because Reed thought Yule's bass playing style would work well on the song "Billy", and Yule agreed to play on the song, later saying he "liked it" and that he had enjoyed the session. More tracks featuring Yule have emerged on a CD re-issue. The title song reached #88 in Canada, while the album itself was #22 for 3 weeks.

The album's tour featured Danny Weis, on guitar; Michael Fonfara, on keyboards; Prakash John, on bass and Pentti "Whitey" Glan, on drums on the European leg. Eric "Mouse" Johnson played drums on the Australian and U.S. sections. The sound engineer for all the live shows was Robin Mayhew, who had previously worked with David Bowie during his Ziggy Stardust period. The following year, Reed contacted Doug Yule again to play guitar on his 1975 world tour.

== Recording and Production ==
Producer Steve Katz had commented on the challenges of the Sally Can't Dance recording sessions: "Sally Can't Dance was [hard] to do. Lou's drug intake was taking its toll and making it very difficult to work with him. On top of that, my house burned to the ground just before mixing.". The album was recorded in New York City from March 18th - April 26, 1974 at Electric Lady Studios

While Sally Can't Dance was a hit upon release in Sept 1974 and elevated Reed's status as a star, he reportedly was disappointed in its production (in which he took a largely passive role) and the treatment of the songs. Reed remarked, "It seems like the less I'm involved with a record, the bigger a hit it becomes. If I weren't on the record at all next time around, it might go to Number One." In a 1976 interview, Reed stated that Sally Can't Dance was "a piece of shit from beginning to end.". Reed also stated in a different interview: "Sally Can't Dance is tedious. Could you imagine putting out Sally Can’t Dance with your name on it? Dyeing my hair and all that shit? That's what they wanted, that's what they got. Sally Can't Dance went into the top ten without a single, and I said, 'Ah, what a piece of shit.'"

Despite Reed's criticism of the album in the years following the album's release, keyboardist Michael Fonfara offered the following perspective on the recording process: "Lou wanted an R&B-sounding funky album for Sally Can’t Dance. That’s the main reason Danny [Weis] and I were first brought into it. And we gave him that, and he was crazy about it." The album also featured a horn section and backing singers as well to achieve the R&B sound Reed was looking for. Years later guitarist Danny Weis confirmed that Reed was interested in moving to an R&B direction for the album: "When we first got together, Michael Fonfara and myself and Prakash had played together before. It was always R&B funk bands. We started taking a couple of Lou's songs and turning them into R&B songs just joking around and having fun with it, and [Reed] said, "What's that?" We were laughing and stuff, and he says, "No, no, no, I like that – let's do it that way." Honest to God, the whole album turned R&B/rock, and we toured that way too. We did every song with a bit of R&B funk flavour under the whole thing, and we had a ball with it, and he likes it. The only album he did with that style."

Following the relative critical successes of Transformer, Berlin and Rock 'n' Roll Animal, Sally Can't Dance received mixed to negative reviews.

Cash Box said of the title song "a bluesy narrative type of vocal singing has made Reed as distinctive a performer as any" that has "the same hit feel" as "Walk on the Wild Side." Robert Christgau of the Village Voice awarded the album a B+ in-spite of describing the album as "a hodgepodge of soul horns, flash guitar, deadpan songspeech, and indifferent rhymes."

In 1974, however, RCA insisted on a rapid follow-up album while Reed's career appeared to be peaking. Tiring of the pressure put on him, and with his contract requiring RCA to release whatever record he gave them, Reed handed over the master tape of Metal Machine Music—an hour of feedback and noise, with no chance of becoming a hit.

== Track listing ==
All tracks are written by Lou Reed.

Side one

1. "Ride Sally Ride" – 4:06
2. "Animal Language" – 3:05
3. "Baby Face" – 5:06
4. "N.Y. Stars" – 4:02

Side two

1. "Kill Your Sons" – 3:40
2. "Ennui" – 3:43
3. "Sally Can't Dance" – 4:12
4. "Billy" – 5:10

Bonus tracks

1. "Good Taste" – 3:30
2. "Sally Can't Dance" (single version) – 2:56

== Personnel ==
Credits are adapted from the Sally Can't Dance liner notes.

Musicians

- Lou Reed – vocals, acoustic guitar on "Billy"
- Danny Weis – guitar, tambourine, backing vocals, horn arrangement
- Paul Fleisher – saxophone on "Billy"
- David Taylor, Lou Marini, Trevor Koehler, Jon Faddis, Alan Rubin, Alex Foster, Lew Soloff – horns
- Steve Katz – harmonica, horn arrangement
- Michael Fonfara – piano, keyboards, Mellotron on "Ennui"
- Prakash John – bass guitar, backing vocals
- Doug Yule – bass guitar on "Billy"
- Ritchie Dharma – drums on "Kill Your Sons" and "Ennui"
- Pentti "Whitey" Glan – drums
- Doug Bartenfeld – guitar
- Michael Wendroff – backing vocals
- Joanne Vent – backing vocals
- Lew Soloff and Martin Sheller - horn arrangements

Production and artwork

- Steve Katz – producer
- Lou Reed – producer
- Mike Stone – recording engineer
- Ralph Moss – remix engineer
- Dennis Katz – cover concept
- Acy Lehman – art direction
- David Edward Byrd – cover art
- Mick Rock – photography

== Charts ==
Chart (1973–1974)	Peak Position
Australia (Kent Music Report)	14
Dutch Albums Chart	18
US Billboard Top LPs & Tape	10

== See also ==
- List of albums released in 1974
- Lou Reed's discography
