= Bang (James Gang album) =

Studio album by James Gang
- Released: September 1973
- Recorded: March 1973
- Studios: Cleveland Recording Company (Cleveland, Ohio); Peter's Palace
- Genres: Rock, hard rock
- Length: 38:03
- Label: Atco
- Producer: James Gang

James Gang chronology
Passin' Thru (1972)	Bang (1973)	Miami (1974)

Bang is the sixth studio album by James Gang, released in 1973. This is the first James Gang album featuring lead guitarist Tommy Bolin after Domenic Troiano left the band.

== Critical reception ==
Professional ratings
Review scores
Source	Rating
AllMusic	3/5 stars

Writing for AllMusic, critic David Jeffries wrote the album "feels less like a band album and more like talented studio musicians on the loose, but die-hard fans of either the Gang or the late Bolin will enjoy it, if only in fits and starts."

== Track listing ==
All songs by Tommy Bolin and John Tesar except where noted.

1. "Standing in the Rain" (Tommy Bolin) – 5:05
2. "The Devil Is Singing Our Song" – 4:22
3. "Must Be Love" (Bolin, Jeff Cook) – 3:48
4. "Alexis" (Bolin, Cook) – 5:07
5. "Ride the Wind" (Bolin, Roy Kenner) – 3:45
6. "Got No Time for Trouble" – 3:47
7. "Rather Be Alone With You (Song For Dale)" (Kenner) – 2:05
8. "From Another Time" – 4:00
9. "Mystery" – 6:10

== Personnel ==
- Roy Kenner – lead vocals, percussion, backing vocals
- Tommy Bolin – guitars, Moog synthesizer, lead vocals on "Alexis", backing vocals on "Standing In The Rain"
- Dale Peters – bass guitar, fuzz bass, percussion, backing vocals on "Standing In The Rain"
- Jim Fox – drums, percussion and piano on "Mystery"

== Sales chart performance ==
Album - Billboard (United States)

Year	Chart	Position
1972	Billboard 200	122
