= Passin' Thru (James Gang album) =

Studio album by James Gang
- Released: October 1972
- Recorded: 1972
- Studios: Quadrafonic Sound (Nashville, Tennessee); Sound City (Van Nuys, California)
- Genres: Rock, hard rock
- Length: 35:36
- Label: ABC
- Producer: James Gang

James Gang chronology
| Straight Shooter (1972) | Passin' Thru (1972) | Bang (1973) |

Passin' Thru is the fifth studio album by American rock band James Gang, released in October 1972, and their final album released on ABC Records (catalog no. ABCX 760). The band moved to Atco Records the next year.

This album is the last James Gang recording featuring guitarist Domenic Troiano, who was replaced by Tommy Bolin.

The scene shown on the album's cover is of the 100 block of East Main Avenue in Bismarck, North Dakota in the 1880s. The large building in the background still stands.

== Critical reception ==
Professional ratings
Review scores
| Source | Rating |
|---|---|
| Allmusic | 2/5 stars |
| Christgau's Record Guide | C |

Writing for Allmusic, critic Stephen Thomas Erlewine wrote the album "Passin' Thru didn't hit as hard as its predecessor, but it did provide an effective showcase for Troiano's talents."

== Track listing ==
All songs by Roy Kenner & Domenic Troiano, except where noted.

1. "Ain't Seen Nothing Yet" – 2:59
2. "One Way Street" (Domenic Troiano) – 4:36
3. "Had Enough" – 3:00
4. "Up to Yourself" (Troiano) – 2:43
5. "Everybody Needs a Hero" – 6:06
6. "Run Run Run" – 3:44
7. "Things I Want to Say to You" (Troiano) – 3:41
8. "Out of Control" (Troiano) – 3:39
9. "Drifting Girl" – 5:09

== Personnel ==
- Roy Kenner - lead vocals; harmonica and percussion on "One Way Street"
- Domenic Troiano - guitars, backing vocals
- Dale Peters - bass, backing vocals
- Jim Fox - drums; organ on "Had Enough"; backing vocals on "Everybody Needs a Hero"

=== Guest musicians ===
- Weldon Myrick - pedal steel guitar
- David Briggs - piano on "Ain't Seen Nothing Yet" and "Drifting Girl"
- Charlie McCoy - harmonica on "Run, Run, Run"
- Craig Sapphin - string arrangements on "Things I Wanted to Say to You"
- William D. "Smitty" Smith - piano, organ and clavinet on "Everybody Needs a Hero"; harpsichord on "Things I Wanted to Say to You"

== Sales chart performance ==
| Year | Chart | Position |
|---|---|---|
| 1972 | Billboard 200 | 72 |
| 1972 | Canada | 28 |
