= Yer' Album =

Studio album by The James Gang
- Released: March 1969
- Recorded: January 1969
- Studio: Hit Factory (New York City)
- Genre: Hard rock; blues rock; psychedelic rock
- Length: 49:40
- Label: Bluesway
- Producer: Bill Szymczyk

The James Gang chronology
Yer' Album (1969)	James Gang Rides Again (1970)

Yer' Album is the debut studio album by American rock band James Gang. The album was released in early 1969 on the Bluesway label. This is the James Gang's only album to feature their bassist Tom Kriss. He was replaced by Dale Peters for their next album. The album is the first to feature guitarist Joe Walsh, who would later achieve success as a solo artist and with Eagles.

Of the eleven tracks featured, three are covers — Buffalo Springfield's "Bluebird", "Lost Woman" by the Yardbirds, and "Stop" by Jerry Ragovoy and Mort Shuman, recorded a year earlier by Howard Tate, as well as a version by Al Kooper and Mike Bloomfield for the Super Session album (albeit without vocals).

In the locked groove at the end of side 1 of the LP version of the album (which is normally silent on most phonograph records), the spoken phrase "Turn me over" repeats in a loop, while the locked groove at the end of side 2 repeats the phrase "Play me again". Both phrases were spoken by Walsh. A 'producers note' in the gatefold warns listeners not to spoil these endings to friends who have turntables with automatic return. These messages are removed from CD pressings, but are included on the 8-Track & cassette tape versions.

== Critical reception ==
Professional ratings
Review scores
Source	Rating
AllMusic	4/5 stars
Robert Christgau	B

Critic William Ruhlman wrote in AllMusic that "Yer' Album contained much to suggest that the James Gang, in particular its guitarist, had a great future, even if it was more an album of performances than compositions."

== Track listing ==
Side one
No.	Title	Writer(s)	Length
1.	"Tuning Part One"	Jim Fox, Bert De Coteaux, Bill Szymczyk	0:40
2.	"Take a Look Around"	Joe Walsh	6:18
3.	"Funk #48"	Walsh, Fox, Tom Kriss	2:46
4.	"Bluebird"	Stephen Stills	6:02
5.	"Lost Woman"	Jeff Beck, Chris Dreja, Jim McCarty, Keith Relf, Paul Samwell-Smith	9:06

Side two
No.	Title	Writer(s)	Length
1.	"Stone Rap"	Walsh, Fox, Kriss, Szymczyk	1:00
2.	"Collage"	Walsh, Patrick Cullie	4:02
3.	"I Don't Have the Time"	Walsh, Fox	2:49
4.	"Wrapcity in English"	Walsh	0:57
5.	"Fred"	Walsh	4:09
6.	"Stop"	Jerry Ragovoy, Mort Shuman	12:04

== Personnel ==
James Gang

- Joe Walsh – vocals, guitars, keyboards, piano
- Tom Kriss – bass guitar; vocals (tracks 10, 11) (also credited with "good vibes" and "cheek flute")
- Jim Fox – drums; vocals (tracks 3, 10, 11), acoustic guitar (track 1), piano (track 4)
- Bill Szymczyk – organ (track 4), tambourine (track 3), maracas (track 7), vocals (tracks (10, 11)
- Jerry Ragavoy – piano (track 11)

Production

- Bill Szymczyk – producer, engineer, photography
- James Gang, Bill Szymczyk, Bert De Coteaux – arrangers
- Denis Minervini – assistant engineer
- Henry Epstein – cover design
- Ladimir Jeric – cover art
