= James Gang Rides Again =

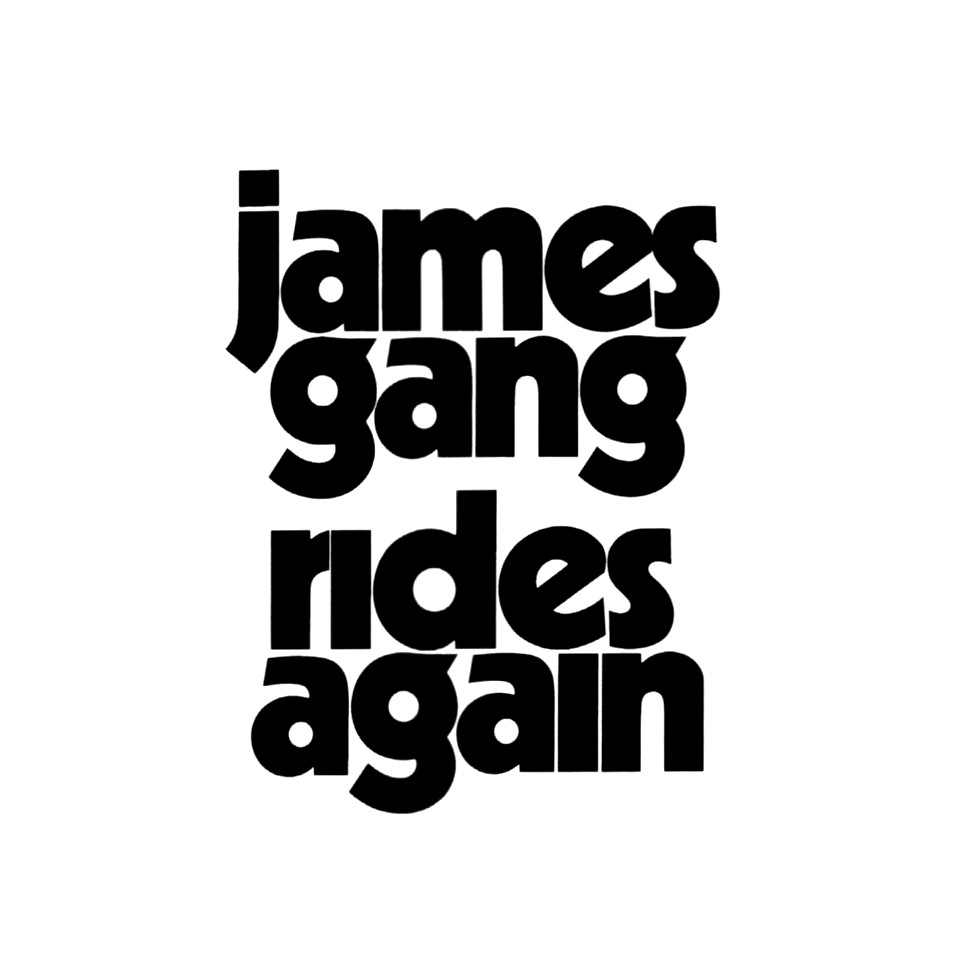

Studio album by James Gang
- Released: July 1970
- Recorded: November 1969
- Studio: Record Plant (Los Angeles)
- Genre: Hard rock; blues rock; folk rock
- Length: 35:09
- Label: ABC
- Producer: Bill Szymczyk

James Gang chronology
| Yer' Album (1969) | James Gang Rides Again (1970) | Thirds (1971) |

James Gang Rides Again (alternatively known as simply Rides Again) is the second studio album by American rock band James Gang. The album was released on the label ABC Records. It is the James Gang's first album to feature bassist Dale Peters.

== Critical reception and legacy ==
Professional ratings
Review scores
| Source | Rating |
|---|---|
| AllMusic | 4.5/5 stars |
| Christgau's Record Guide | B− |

Writing for AllMusic, critic Stephen Thomas Erlewine wrote of the album "With their second album Rides Again, the James Gang came into their own... Walsh's songwriting had improved, giving the band solid support for their stylistic experiments. What ties the two sides of the record together is the strength of the band's musicianship, which burns brightly and powerfully on the hardest rockers, as well as on the sensitive ballads." Music critic John Swenson named it "one of the most important rock records of the Seventies."

In 1999, Fatboy Slim sampled the string coda of the song "Ashes the Rain and I" from the album on his track "Right Here, Right Now".

== Track listing ==
All tracks are written by Joe Walsh, except where noted.

| No. | Title | Writer(s) | Length |
|---|---|---|---|
| 1. | "Funk #49" | Fox, Peters, Walsh | 3:54 |
| 2. | "Asshtonpark" | Fox, Peters, Walsh | 2:01 |
| 3. | "Woman" | Fox, Peters, Walsh | 4:37 |
| 4. | "The Bomber: "Closet Queen"/ "Bolero"/ "Cast Your Fate to the Wind" | Fox, Peters, Walsh, Maurice Ravel, Vince Guaraldi | 7:04 |
| 5. | "Tend My Garden" | | 5:45 |
| 6. | "Garden Gate" | | 1:36 |
| 7. | "There I Go Again" | | 2:51 |
| 8. | "Thanks" | | 2:21 |
| 9. | "Ashes the Rain and I" | Peters, Walsh | 5:00 |
| Total length: | | | 35:09 |

On the initial pressings of James Gang Rides Again, a 1:25 electric rendition of Maurice Ravel's "Boléro" is interpolated into the song "The Bomber." Ravel's estate threatened suit against both the James Gang and ABC Records for its unauthorized use. As a result, the track was edited, and the "Boléro" section was removed on most subsequent pressings of the album. The edited song's running time on such pressings is 5:39. Some late 1970s LP pressings included "Boléro" by mistake, and the most recent CD re-issue of Rides Again contains the full version of "The Bomber," with the "Boléro" section restored.

== Personnel ==
James Gang

- Joe Walsh – electric and acoustic guitars, keyboards, vocals, liner notes
- Dale Peters – bass guitar, 12-string acoustic guitar ("Ashes the Rain and I")
- Jim Fox – drums, percussion

Additional

- Rusty Young – pedal steel guitar ("There I Go Again")

Production

- Bill Szymczyk – production, engineer, remastering
- Mike D. Stone – engineer
- Ted Jensen – remastering
- Dale Peters – liner notes
- Jim Fox – liner notes
- Tom Wright – photography
