= The Lincolns =

Canadian rhythm and blues band

- Origin: Toronto, Canada
- Genres: Rhythm and blues
- Years active: 1979–present
- Label: Attic
- Members: Prakash John; Steve Ambrose; Vezi Tayyeb; Denis Keldie; Jordan John; John Panchyshyn; Russ Little; Tony Carlucci
- Past members: Michael Fonfara
- Website: www.thelincolns.ca

The Lincolns are a Canadian rhythm and blues band, fronted by Prakash John and based in Toronto, Ontario. The band performs music in the style of the 1960s and 1970s.

== History ==
In 1979, after leaving the Alice Cooper tours, Prakash John returned to Toronto and founded an R&B band, The Lincolns. He recruited musicians from previous tours. The Lincolns performed locally in Toronto and also toured around Ontario. In August 1987 they appeared in the CBC television special "Live at the Astrolabe".

The band has released two albums, Take One on Attic Records and the independently released Funky Funky Funky, originally commissioned by the CBC.

With various personnel changes, the Lincolns continue to play around Canada, performing R&B music in the style of the 1960s and 1970s. In 2016, the band performed as part of the musical production Simply the Best.
