= Roy Kenner =

Music Artist

- Born: Roy Douglas Kenner; January 14, 1948 (age 78)
- Origin: Toronto, Canada
- Genres: Rock
- Occupations: Singer, songwriter
- Instrument: Vocals

Roy Douglas Kenner (born January 14, 1948, in Toronto) is a Canadian singer and songwriter, most notable as the lead vocalist of Mandala in the late 1960s and as the lead vocalist of the James Gang during 1972–1974.

== History ==
Kenner's international fame was primarily as the lead vocalist for the James Gang from 1972 until 1974. He joined the group after the departure of Joe Walsh and was with the band with guitarist Domenic Troiano and later Tommy Bolin. He was also with Domenic Troiano in the Canadian bands Mandala and Bush, both of which had some degree of international success, and sang on Troiano's solo albums.

In the 1970s, Kenner was instrumental in launching the career of Lisa Dal Bello. Her first single, "(I Don't Want To) Stand in Your Way," was written by Kenner, and is regarded as one of the strongest songs on her self-titled 1977 debut album.

Following his time with the James Gang, Kenner worked with a Toronto-based television musical variety show, Keith Hampshire's Music Machine, for approximately two years, after which he worked with Garry Peterson (drummer for The Guess Who) in an unrecorded R&B band, Delphia. In 1975, Kenner joined the U.S. band, Law, and recorded two albums with them, on the Goldhawke Records|Goldhawke record label, owned by Roger Daltrey.

Kenner then rejoined Domenic Troiano, co-writing and singing on Troiano's 1979 album, Fret Fever. The record included the dance hit "We All Need Love," Troiano's biggest commercial success. The two also collaborated on TV soundtracks, in particular the theme to the TV series Night Heat.

Despite his international success as a lead vocalist, Kenner has never released a solo album. In 1982, he contributed to one half of a six-song EP, Roy Kenner/The Royals, with three songs co-written with and produced by Domenic Troiano.

Kenner currently does jingles and voice-over work in Toronto, in addition to performing occasionally. He has performed at the 2006 and 2007 "We All Need Love" tribute concerts for Domenic Troiano, who succumbed to cancer in 2005.

== Discography ==
=== Mandala ===
- 1968 Soul Crusade (Atlantic)

=== Bush ===
- 1970 Bush (Dunhill)

=== James Gang ===
- 1972 Passin' Thru (ABC)
- 1972 Straight Shooter (ABC)
- 1973 Bang (Atco)
- 1974 Miami (Atco)

=== Law ===
- 1977 Breakin' It (MCA)
- 1977 Hold On To It (MCA)

=== Solo ===
- 1982 Roy Kenner/The Royals

=== Other contributions ===
- 1977 Lisa Dal Bello, Lisa Dal Bello
- 1979 Domenic Troiano, Fret Fever
- 1986 Theme Song, Night Heat
