= Mandala (band) =

Canadian R&B band

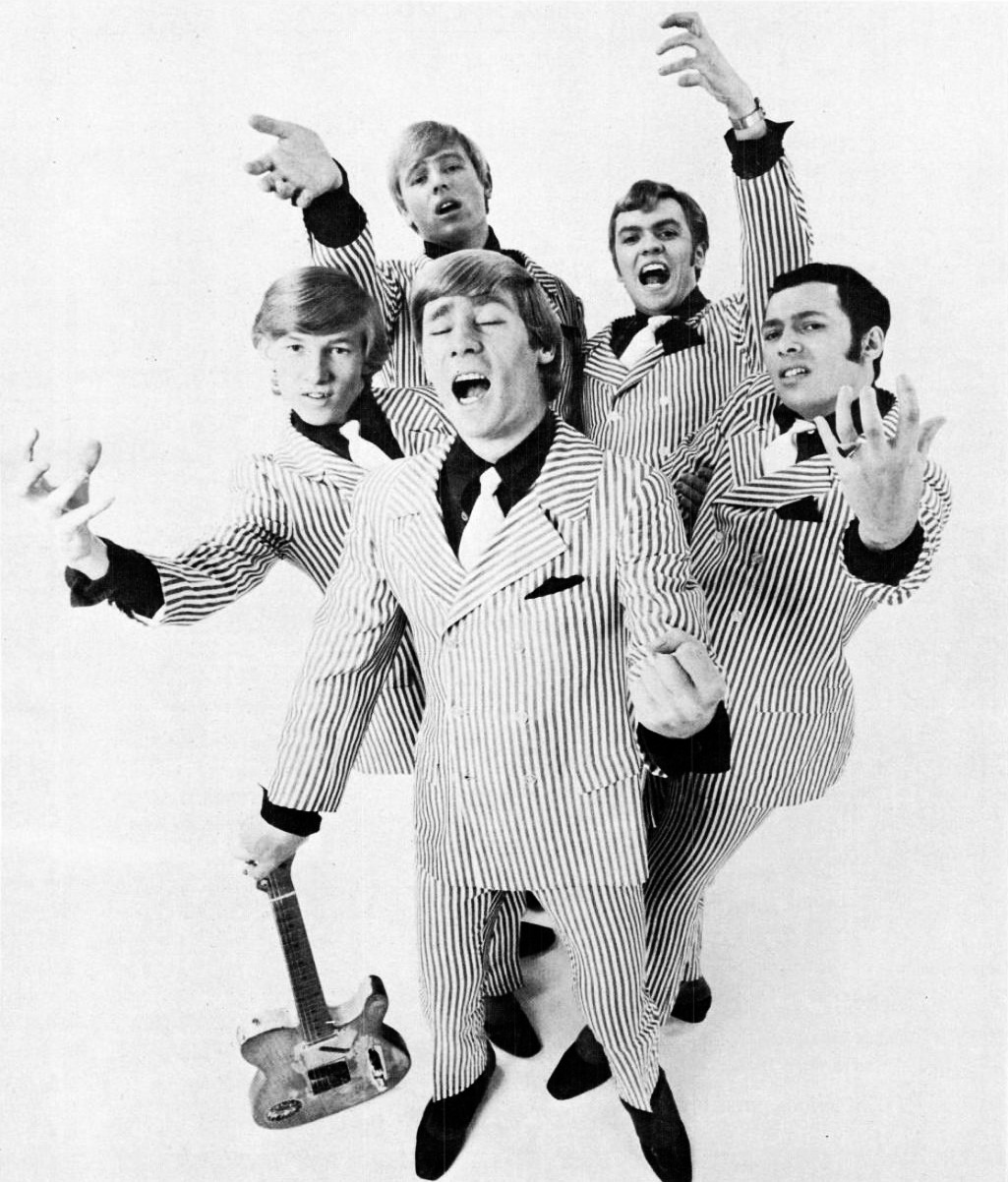
- The group in 1967

Background information
- Also known as: The Rogues
- Origin: Toronto, Ontario, Canada
- Genre: Rhythm and Blues
- Years active: 1965–1970
- Past members: Domenic Troiano; Roy Kenner; Joey Chirowski; Don Elliot; George Olliver; Pentti Glan; Henry Babraj; Hugh Sullivan

Mandala was a Canadian R&B and soul band from the 1960s. The band was formed in 1965 in Toronto, Ontario as The Rogues and changed their name to Mandala prior to their first Canadian Top 40 hit "Opportunity". The band is best known for containing guitarist Domenic Troiano who later recorded with The James Gang and The Guess Who; and drummer Pentti Glan who later played with Alice Cooper and Lou Reed. The band also contained Roy Kenner, who later became the lead singer for The James Gang.

== History ==
Mandala's origins can be traced back to the house band at the Club Bluenote in Toronto during the summer of 1964. Keyboardist Josef Chirowski, bassist Don Elliot, and drummer Pentti "Whitey" Glan had worked together previously in several outfits. The band adopted the name The Rogues when singer George Olliver and guitarist Domenic Troiano joined in 1965. For a very brief period in late 1965, future Blood, Sweat & Tears singer David Clayton-Thomas was a member. They were also briefly known as the Five Rogues.

By late 1966, the band's manager Randy Markowitz sensed a change in the Canadian rock scene, and restarted the band under the name Mandala with a new image involving matching gangster-styled suits, with concerts emulating religious revivals. Olliver left the band and was replaced with new singer Roy Kenner, while Hugh Sullivan joined on keyboards. The band's newly energetic performances attracted widespread interest among fans in Toronto. They also performed several concerts in the United States during this period.

In late 1966, they signed with KR Records and released the single "Opportunity" which became a top-ten hit in Canada. The song was noticed by Ahmet Ertegun, who then signed the band to his label Atlantic Records. Ertegun and Markowitz often clashed over how to market the band, while Ertegun favored making Troiano the frontman and removing Kenner. After two early singles with Atlantic, the band released the album Soul Crusade in 1968. The single "Love-itis" was a minor hit in the United States.

Mandala soon broke up, with Troiano, Kenner, and Glan forming the band Bush soon thereafter. Chirowski and Glan both later played with Alice Cooper, while Sullivan backed John Kay.

== Discography ==
- 45 – "Opportunity" / "Lost Love" (KR 0115) – 1967
- 45 – "Give and Take" / "From Toronto '67" (KR 0121) – 1967
- 45 – "Love-Itis" / "Mellow Carmello Palumbo" (Atlantic 2512) – 1968
- 45 – "You Got Me" / "Help Me" (Atlantic 2576) – 1968
- LP – Soul Crusade (Atlantic SD 8184) – 1968
