= James Gang =

American rock band

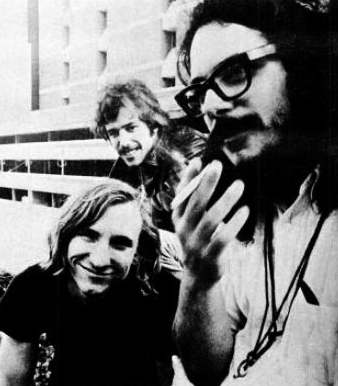
- The band's classic lineup in 1970; left to right: Joe Walsh, Dale Peters, Jim Fox

Background information
- Origin: Cleveland, Ohio, U.S.
- Genres: Hard rock; blues rock; psychedelic rock; funk rock
- Years active: 1966–1977; 1991; 1996; 1998; 2001; 2005; 2006; 2022
- Labels: ABC; Atco
- Past members: Jim Fox; Joe Walsh; Dale Peters; Tom Kriss

James Gang was an American rock band formed in Cleveland, Ohio in 1966. The band went through a variety of line-up changes until they recorded their first album as a power trio consisting of Joe Walsh (guitars, lead vocals), Tom Kriss (bass) and Jim Fox (drums). Dale Peters replaced Kriss on bass for the band's second and third albums. Two of the band's songs, "Funk #49" and "Walk Away", continue to be popular on classic rock and AOR stations.

In late 1971, Walsh left to pursue a solo career and would later join the Eagles. The band carried on with a number of other guitarists and lead singers to replace Walsh. However, after failing to produce a hit song over the course of six more studio albums, the band finally broke up in 1977. Walsh, Fox and Peters have reformed for reunions since then, including September 3, 2022, when the power trio returned for a performance at the Taylor Hawkins Tribute Concert held in Wembley Stadium.

== History ==
=== Early years ===
Drummer Jim Fox first played with the Cleveland-area band the Outsiders but left them in 1965 to attend college. After they had a national hit the following year with "Time Won't Let Me" (no.5 on the Billboard Hot 100), Fox returned temporarily to play with them after their drummer was drafted. After leaving them again to return to school, Fox, heavily influenced by the sound of British Invasion bands such as the Beatles, the Who and the Yardbirds, began to think about forming his own band and teamed up with schoolmate Ronnie Silverman (guitar), bassist Tom Kriss and keyboardist Phil Giallombardo in 1966.

The James Gang's earliest lineup consisted of Fox (drums), Kriss (bass), Silverman (guitar), Giallombardo (vocals, keyboards), and after auditioning some 25 candidates for lead guitar, the band decided to go with Greg Grandillo, who later played with another popular Cleveland band, Rainbow Canyon. He was soon replaced by Dennis Chandler, who was then succeeded by John "Mouse" Michalski who, with the Count Five, had just enjoyed a national hit with "Psychotic Reaction".

A short time later, Fox was invited to audition for a nine-piece rhythm and blues band that was being assembled. Fox initially declined the offer but changed his mind when he heard that local guitar legend Glenn Schwartz, who was fresh out of the army, was to be in attendance. After hearing Schwartz play, and hearing that two of his influences were the Spencer Davis Group and Jeff Beck, Fox was impressed and invited Schwartz to join the James Gang. However, Michalski was not as enthused by his playing and left the band. Silverman soon departed as well to enter the military. Bill Jeric was then brought in to play alongside Schwartz. No recordings were ever released by these early lineups of the band.

Around Christmastime of 1967, Schwartz, who was found to be AWOL from the army and was breaking up with his wife, decided to leave the band and move to California, where he ended up forming the band Pacific Gas & Electric.

=== Joe Walsh years ===
Just days later, shortly after the new year of 1968, a friend of Schwartz's, Joe Walsh (from a band called The Measles), knocked on Fox's door and asked to be given a tryout as Schwartz's replacement. Walsh was accepted and the band continued as a five-piece for a short time until Giallombardo, who was still in high school at the time, left. Jeric and Walsh worked together on guitar parts, but in the spring of 1968, Jeric ended up leaving as well. He was replaced by a returning Ronnie Silverman, who had been discharged from the military.

On June 9, 1968 the group played a concert in Detroit at the Grande Ballroom opening for Cream. At the last minute, Silverman informed the others that he would not be joining them. The band, desperately in need of the money, took to the stage as a trio. They liked their sound as a threesome and decided to remain that way.

In 1968 the band signed with manager Mark Barger, who was handling the career of fellow Ohio band The Lemon Pipers, who had just scored a big hit with "Green Tambourine". Barger put the Gang in touch with ABC Records staff producer Bill Szymczyk, who got them signed to ABC's new Bluesway Records subsidiary in January 1969.

In March 1969 the band, now consisting of Fox, Kriss and Walsh and produced by Szymczyk, released its debut LP, Yer' Album.

Later in 1969, Szymczyk was music coordinator for the George Englund movie Zachariah (which was released in 1971), based on the 1922 novel Siddhartha by writer Hermann Hesse. Szymczyk arranged for the band to appear in the movie, with two James Gang songs, "Laguna Salada" and "Country Fever", also being used. For the recording of these two songs, vocalist Kenny Weiss, a friend of Fox's, was brought in to allow Walsh to focus on his guitar playing. However, Weiss was gone by the time the group arrived in Mexico to film their scenes in the movie. "Laguna Salada" and "Country Fever" later reappeared as bonus tracks on the 2000 re-release of The James Gang Greatest Hits.

In November 1969 bassist Tom Kriss left the band after his father was diagnosed with lung cancer. Kriss was replaced by Dale Peters, who was brought in from another group called Case of E.T. Hooley.

In 1969 Roger Abramson went to JB's, a small club in Kent, Ohio, and advised Belkin Productions to start a Management division with the James Gang and the band Silk, which included Michael Stanley.

In July 1970 the band, composed of Fox, Peters and Walsh, released its second album, James Gang Rides Again, which included the popular single "Funk #49."

In the spring of 1970, Belkin Productions arranged for the band to open for the Who for six dates during a US tour and their guitarist Pete Townshend was so impressed with them he invited the band to open for them on their fall tour of the United Kingdom. Townshend and Walsh then started a long friendship with Townshend telling Rolling Stone that Walsh was "the best" American guitar player. In January 1971 they appeared on Top of the Pops in the United Kingdom.

In July 1971 the Gang returned to tour Europe. During their heyday, the band also shared the stage with artists like Grand Funk Railroad, Kinks, Humble Pie, Three Dog Night and Led Zeppelin.

But after two more albums, 1971's Thirds, and the live album James Gang Live in Concert released later that same year, Walsh, who was tired of the pressure of doing most of the writing and singing and being the only melodic instrument in the trio, left the band in December 1971. He relocated to the mountains of Colorado and eventually formed Barnstorm.

=== Post-Walsh 1970s ===
Peters and Fox carried on with vocalist Roy Kenner and guitarist Domenic Troiano (both ex-members of two Canadian bands, Bush & Mandala, who gained fame with "Love-Itis" a single from the Mandala's only album, 'Soul Crusade'), Straight Shooter and Passin' Thru, both released in 1972. But in recent interviews, Fox stated that things did not work out musically with Troiano as hoped, so Troiano left the band in 1973 and would subsequently join the Guess Who.

James Gang in 1976. Left to right: Bob Webb, Phil Giallombardo, Jim Fox, Dale Peters

Troiano was replaced by guitarist Tommy Bolin, formally from Zephyr, after Joe Walsh called to recommend him to the band. Bolin joined the band in August 1973 and appeared on two albums, Bang! and Miami, that saw the band moving from ABC Records over to Atlantic Records' Atco label.

During the recording of Miami in 1974, Kenner ran into legal troubles after a drug bust and was not available initially for recording. Other singers were reportedly auditioned but eventually Kenner was able to return to complete the album. Not happy with the musical direction, and frustrated with the indifference from Bolin concerning new material, Kenner gave notice, telling Fox and Peters he would stay on until a replacement was found. Aware of this development, a disillusioned Bolin decided to leave as well, albeit in a slightly different manner: no notice, and simply not showing up for the gig. Bolin went on to work with Dr. John and Alphonse Mouzon and attempted to form another group with future Crosby, Stills and Nash keyboardist Mike Finnigan before accepting the offer from Deep Purple in 1975.

After Kenner's departure he later joined Ohio based band LAW, followed by a stint with Troiano, then some solo projects, and many years doing voice-over sessions. After Kenner and Bolin's exit, the band went over to England to look for a new guitar player. Jimmy McCulloch (ex-Thunderclap Newman) expressed interest in joining but was committed to Paul McCartney's Wings. The group returned home dejected.

By early 1975, Fox and Peters decided to try again with a new lineup that included Fox's old friends, vocalist Bubba Keith, who had been playing in Los Angeles with a band called Uncle Tom and guitarist Richard Shack who had previously played in the band Case of E.T. Hooley with Peters. This lineup recorded the album Newborn, which featured a cover of the Elvis Presley staple "Heartbreak Hotel". The band released a final recording, Jesse Come Home, in February 1976, which featured the return of early member Phil Giallombardo, who rejoined along with new guitarist/vocalist Bob Webb (who, like Joe Walsh, had played in the group The Measles).

Ultimately, none of the post-Walsh lineups achieved the level of success enjoyed in their early 1970s heyday. Drummer Fox was the only remaining member of the original band when James Gang finally disbanded early in 1977.

=== Later years ===
In a 1998 Chris Welch interview, Fox talks of the Gang's final years and the breakup: "It became a quest to find a suitable replacement for Joe Walsh. We'd try some guys and do an album or two, but it wasn't quite what we wanted and so we'd move on to something else in the hope of recapturing the old spirit. Some of the albums were good but we were always looking to find that particular thing we had with Joe and I don't think we ever found it again. So, after all those changes, Dale and I just talked one day and said 'Enough's enough'. That's when we decided to let it go. I never aspired to start another band. Instead I decided to take six months off and see what happened. If John Lennon called I'd see about it. That was my attitude. I wasn't looking to start up again."

After James Gang broke up, Fox was involved for a time with the Belkin management firm, who handled the affairs for artists like Michael Stanley Band, Wild Cherry and Donnie Iris. As for other latter day Gang members, Bubba Keith went on to play for England Dan & John Ford Coley and was later the lead vocalist for Point Blank, while Bob Webb played in Jay Ferguson's band.

The "classic" lineup of the band consisting of Walsh, Peters and Fox first reunited in July 1991 at Nautica Pavilion in Cleveland when Fox and Peters took to the stage during a Walsh concert to play three songs. The trio then gathered together again to perform at an election rally for President Bill Clinton at the Cleveland State University Convocation Center on November 4, 1996. They also appeared on The Drew Carey Show in the 1998–99 season and at the Rock and Roll Hall of Fame and the Allen Theater in Cleveland for three shows in February 2001, joined by keyboardist Mark Avsec (ex-Wild Cherry and Donnie Iris & the Cruisers). And in the summer of 2005, the group performed another handful of shows (joined again by Avsec) in the Cleveland area.

As of May 2004, Glenn Schwartz was playing guitar and singing Thursday nights at "Major Hooples" in the Flats, Cleveland. And as of 2014, Schwartz continued to perform at the Beachland Ballroom in Cleveland. Schwartz died on November 3, 2018, at the age of 77.

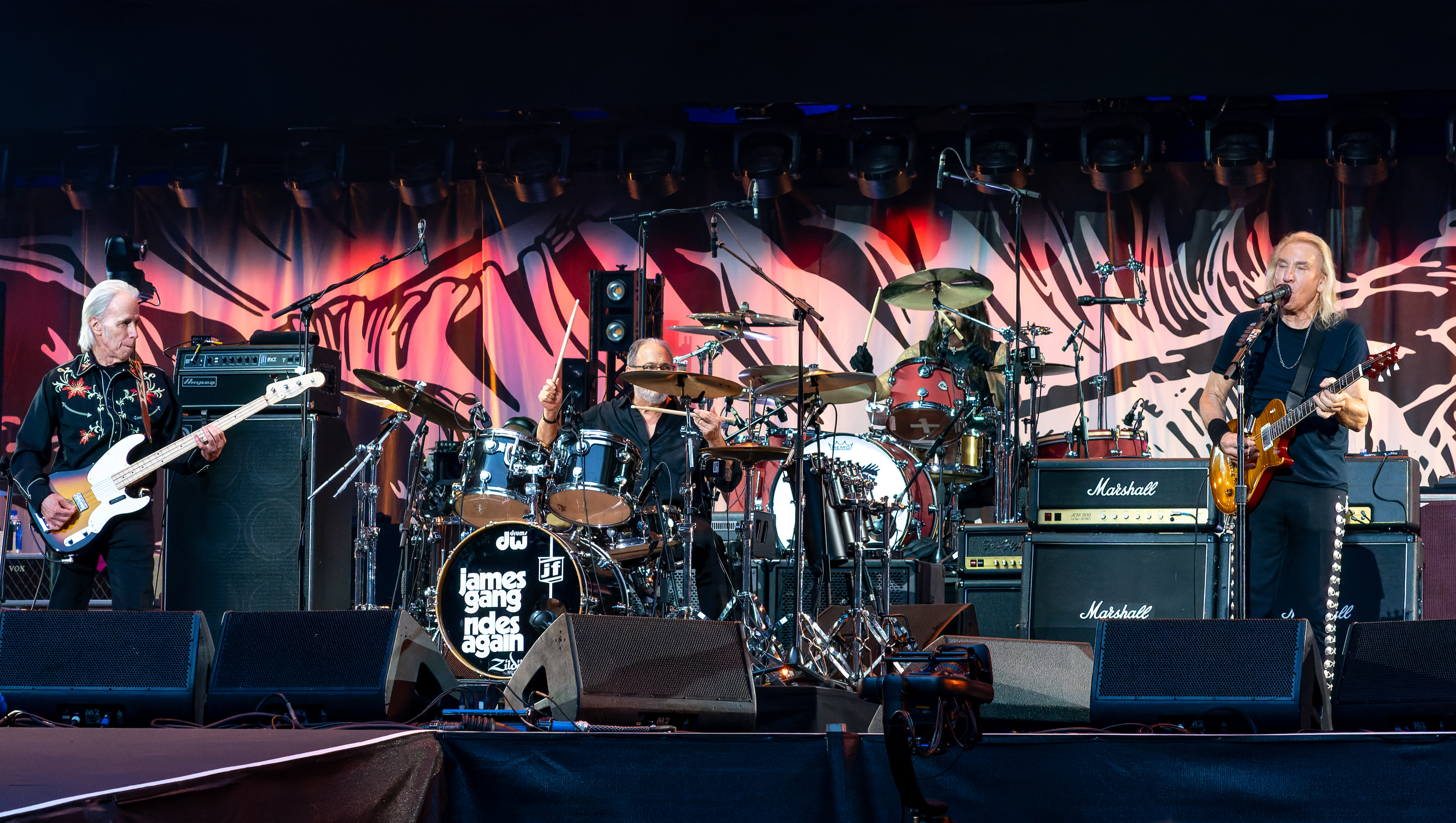
James Gang performing at the Taylor Hawkins tribute concert in September 2022

In April 2006 it was announced that the Walsh/Peters/Fox lineup of the group would be touring the United States later that summer, supported by keyboardist Bill Appleberry and backing vocalists Gia Ciambetti, Robbyn Kirmsse and Stacy Michelle. During this summer tour, the band appeared in August performing live on The Howard Stern Show on Sirius Satellite Radio.

In March 2012 it was stated on ultimateclassicrock.com that Walsh was in the Cleveland-area Lava Room Recording Studios with Fox and Peters, working on new recordings of their well-known James Gang tracks, with longtime friends Joe Vitale and Michael Stanley contributing. Since this time, however, nothing more has been heard about this.

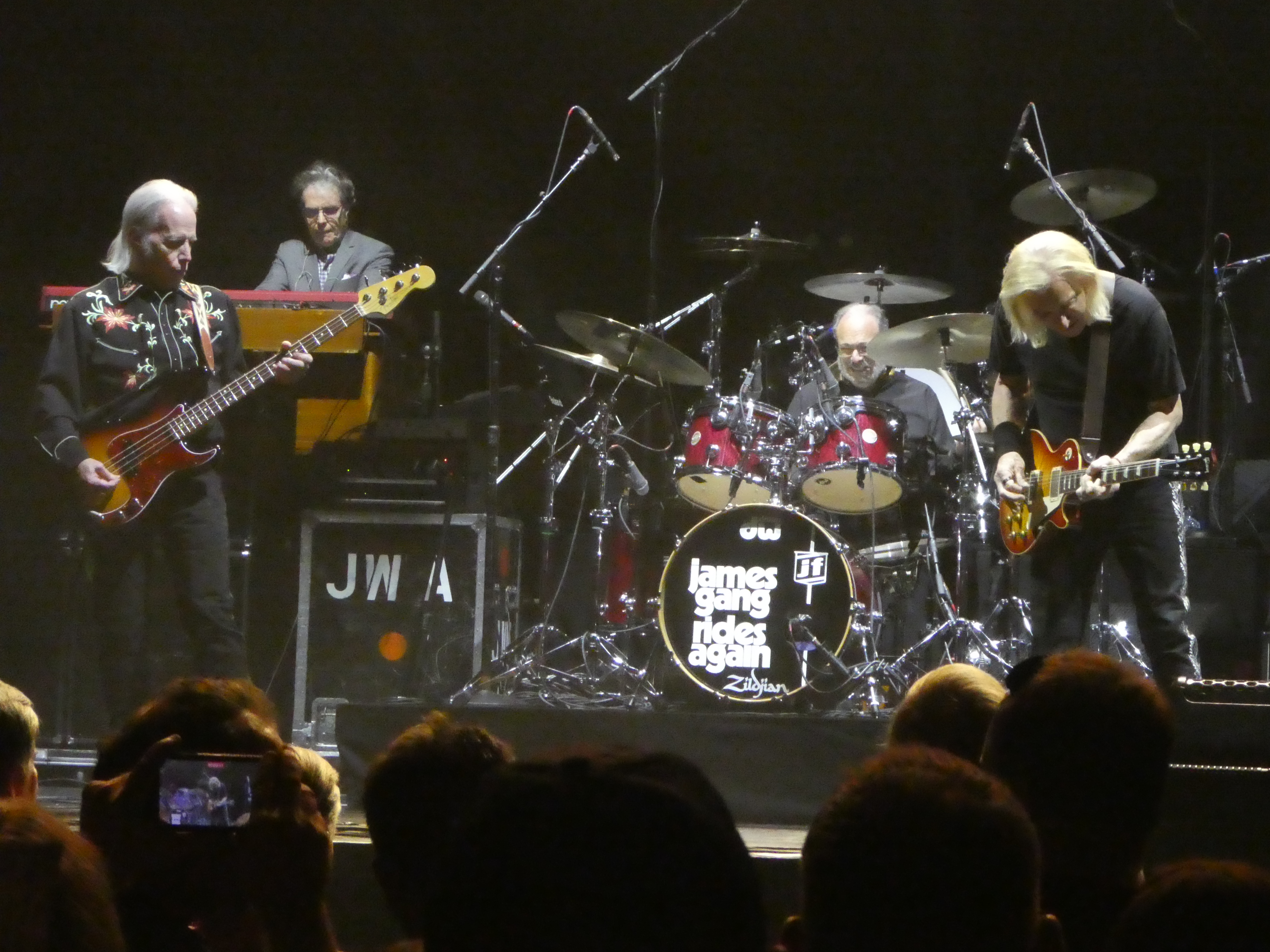
James Gang at VetsAid concert

In August 2022 it was announced that the band would play two shows for the Taylor Hawkins tribute concerts. The shows were scheduled for September 3 at Wembley Stadium and September 27 at the Kia Forum.

The James Gang participated in their first in-store signing event in over 50 years on November 8, 2022, at Used Kids Records in Columbus, Ohio. After a brief interview, Jimmy Fox, Joe Walsh and Dale Peters signed autographs at the store, which is located just a few blocks from Walsh’s childhood home. Proceeds from the event raised funds for various veterans-related organizations via Walsh’s VetsAid charity.

On November 13, 2022, once again supported by Mark Avsec and a vocal trio, and joined on their encore on drums by Dave Grohl, the group performed at the VetsAid concert in Columbus, Ohio. There were early reports that VetsAid would be the final gig for the James Gang, but Joe Walsh said that may not be the case. "Glenn Frey used to say never say never, so I'm not," Walsh explained. "We played the concerts for Taylor Hawkins and it worked really good; we got in front of an audience and we were able to do what we used to do. I haven't played loud on 11 in a long time; I play in a vocal group, so I have small amps. It's different to turn it up and go for it, and I didn't realize how much I missed it until we started cookin' with the James Gang. I can't wait to play again."

== Discography ==
James Gang studio albums
Year	Name	US	AUS	CAN	Notes
1969	Yer' Album	83	—	79	
1970	James Gang Rides Again	20	—	13	RIAA: Gold
1971	Thirds	27	42	32	RIAA: Gold
1972	Straight Shooter	58	—	39	
1972	Passin' Thru	72	—	28	
1973	Bang	122	—	—	
1974	Miami	97	—	—	
1975	Newborn	109	—	—	
1976	Jesse Come Home	—	—	—	

James Gang live albums
Year	Name	US	CAN	Notes
1971	James Gang Live in Concert	24	25	RIAA: Gold

James Gang compilation albums
Year	Name	US	CAN
1973	The Best Of ... featuring Joe Walsh	79	33
1973	16 Greatest Hits	181	—
1997	Funk #49	—	—

James Gang singles
Year	Title	Chart peak		Album
Year	Title	Billboard Hot 100	CAN	Album
1969	"I Don't Have the Time"	—	—	Yer' Album
1969	"Funk #48"	126	—	Yer' Album
1970	"Stop"	—	—	Yer' Album
1970	"Take a Look Around"	—	—	Yer' Album
1970	"Funk #49"	59	26	James Gang Rides Again
1971	"Walk Away"	51	31	Thirds
1971	"Midnight Man"	80	46	Thirds
1972	"Looking for My Lady"	108	82	Straight Shooter
1972	"Madness"	—	—	Straight Shooter
1972	"Had Enough"	111	—	Passin' Thru
1973	"Must Be Love"	54	51	Bang
1973	"Got No Time for Trouble"	—	—	Bang
1974	"Standing in the Rain"	101	84	Bang
1974	"Cruisin' Down the Highway"	—	—	Miami
1975	"Merry-Go-Round"	—	—	Newborn
1976	"I Need Love"	—	—	Jesse Come Home

"Cruisin' Down the Highway" peaked at 122 on the Record World Singles Chart.

== Band members ==
Final lineup

- Jimmy Fox – drums, percussion, keyboards, guitar, backing vocals (1966–1977, 1991, 1996, 1998, 2001, 2005, 2006, 2022)
- Joe Walsh – guitar, keyboards, lead vocals (1968–1971, 1991, 1996, 1998, 2001, 2005, 2006, 2022)
- Dale Peters – bass, guitar, percussion, backing vocals (1969–1977, 1991, 1996, 1998, 2001, 2005, 2006, 2022)
