= Domenic Troiano =

Italian-Canadian guitarist (1946–2005)

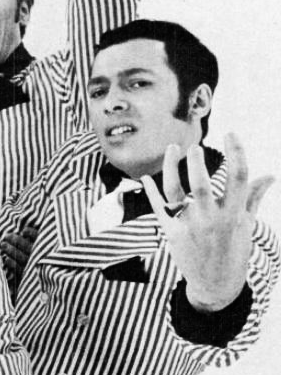
- Troiano in 1967

Background information
- Born: Domenic Michele Antonio Troiano; January 17, 1946; Modugno, Italy
- Origin: Toronto, Ontario, Canada
- Died: May 25, 2005 (aged 59)
- Genres: Rock
- Occupations: Singer; songwriter
- Instrument: Guitar
- Formerly of: The James Gang; the Guess Who; Bush; Mandala

Domenic Michele Antonio Troiano (January 17, 1946 – May 25, 2005) was an Italian–Canadian guitarist and songwriter, best known as a member of Mandala, Bush, the James Gang, and the Guess Who. He also recorded music for film and television, often made guest appearances on other musicians' albums, and worked as a producer.

== Early life ==
Troiano was born in Modugno, Italy, and his family emigrated to Toronto, Ontario, during his childhood. He became a Canadian citizen in 1955.

== Career ==
=== Early career ===
His first professional music work was in the early 1960s with a band fronted by Ronnie Hawkins. In 1965, Troiano joined a local Toronto band called the Five Rogues, which later found success as Mandala. The band achieved several hit singles in Canada, and played several times in the United States.

Mandala disbanded in 1969, after which Troiano and some of the other members formed the new band Bush. This band also found success in Canada and toured the United States; Three Dog Night recorded one of their songs. Bush broke up in 1970 after releasing one album. Troiano owned the rights to the band's name, which became an issue of media interest in the mid-1990s upon the emergence of the successful British rock band also called Bush. That band was temporarily forced to use the name "Bush^{x}" in Canada, though Troiano offered a deal in which the band was allowed to use simply "Bush" in return for a donation to the Starlight Foundation and the Canadian Music Therapy Fund.

=== The James Gang and the Guess Who ===
In 1970, Troiano appeared on Axe, a solo album by the Guess Who guitarist Randy Bachman, and collaborated with the Guess Who on an aborted movie soundtrack. This was the beginning of Troiano's association with that band, which he would join several years later. Troiano then announced a solo album, but before it was completed he joined James Gang in 1972, replacing Joe Walsh. He appeared on the albums Straight Shooter and Passin' Thru, both released in 1972, but those albums failed to attain the popularity that the band had enjoyed before Walsh's departure. While with James Gang, Troiano released his self-titled debut solo album in which he also sang lead vocals; this was his third overall album in 1972. This was followed by his second solo album Tricky in 1973, displaying a jazz rock sound. Troiano left James Gang in 1973, to be replaced by Tommy Bolin.

Troiano next joined the Guess Who in 1974, replacing departed guitarists Kurt Winter and Donnie McDougall, and becoming one of the group's primary songwriters in conjunction with leader Burton Cummings. Having grown up in Toronto, Troiano was the first member of the Guess Who not to hail from Winnipeg. He appeared on the albums Flavours and Power in the Music, which were noted for moving the Guess Who into jazz rock due to Troiano's songwriting influence. Cummings was unhappy with this new sound, and disbanded the long-running group in 1975.

=== Later career ===
Troiano then resumed his solo career, releasing three more solo albums by 1979. His 1979 song "We All Need Love" became a substantial hit in Europe when it was covered by Eurodance group Double You in 1992. Meanwhile, Troiano formed another new band called Black Market, which released one album in 1981. Troiano then turned to soundtrack work for film and television, and served as producer for other artists. He was inducted into the Canadian Music Hall of Fame in 1996.

== Death ==
Troiano died from prostate cancer at age 59 on May 25, 2005. In his name, the Domenic Troiano Guitar Scholarship was established in 2006, and is now known as the Domenic Troiano Guitar Awards. He was also commemorated in a collection of music memorabilia at the Brunswick House pub and museum in Toronto.

== Selected discography ==
With Mandala

- Soul Crusade (1968)

With Bush

- Bush (1970)

With James Gang

- Straight Shooter (1972)
- Passin' Thru (1972)

With the Guess Who

- Flavours (1974)
- Power in the Music (1975)

With Black Market

- Changing of the Guard (1981)

The Domenic Troiano Band/Solo

- Domenic Troiano (1972)
- Tricky (1973)
- Burnin' at the Stake (1977)
- The Joke's on Me (1978)
- Fret Fever (1979)
- The Best of Domenic Troiano – 20th Century Masters – The Millennium Collection (2003)

With others

- David Clayton-Thomas, David Clayton–Thomas (RCA Victor, 1973)
- Moe Koffman, If You Don't Know Me By Now... (Elektra, 1982)
- Joe Cocker, Civilized Man (Capitol, 1984)
- Matt Dusk, Two Shots (Decca, 2004)
- Ronnie Hawkins, Still Cruisin' (Hawk, 2002)
- Eye to Eye, Shakespeare Stole My Baby (Warner Bros., 1983)
- Diana Ross, Ross (RCA, 1983)

== See also ==
- Music of Canada
- Canadian Music Hall of Fame
