= Jimmy Fox =

American drummer

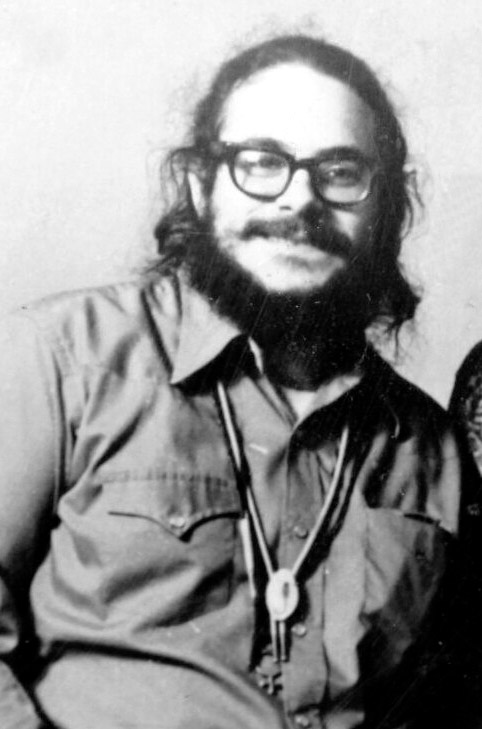

Background information
- Also known as: Jim Fox
- Born: James Kent Fox; August 24, 1947 (age 79)
- Origin: Cleveland, Ohio, U.S.
- Occupation: Musician
- Instrument: Drums
- Formerly of: James Gang

James Kent Fox (born August 24, 1947) is an American musician best known as the drummer of the James Gang, as well as the band's founder and its namesake. He is the only member of the group to appear in every incarnation of the band. He joined a mostly instrumental Cleveland rock and R&B band called Tom King and the Starfires while in high school and also remained as a member of its successor band, the Outsiders.

== Education ==
Fox took advantage of the opportunity to study drums in school when he was in the fourth grade. Beginning with a pair of sticks and a practice pad, he also had the chance to take instruction from a junior high band director each week. As he recalled in an interview, he began taking music theory classes at the Cleveland Music School Settlement when he was approximately seven or eight years old.

"They were valuable to me because over and above what I actually learned there. I was already aspiring to be a drummer," Fox says. "But my father was dead set against it, preferring that I choose a 'musical' instrument." The elder Fox had good reason to be cautious—he had been a professional violinist and vocalist with Paul Whiteman's orchestra, working with the bandleader in Los Angeles and also on the road in the 1920s.

With the help of his instructor at the Settlement, he was eventually able to change his father's mind and his dad helped him find further education resources to develop his playing skills.

"My dad checked out the local teaching scene and found a private drum teacher who was involved in both classical music and popular music, as well as the basics of jazz," he says. "This was very beneficial to me because it allowed me to receive a rounded education on not only drums, but all percussion instruments, including mallets (marimba, xylophone, etc.) and tympani."

== Career ==
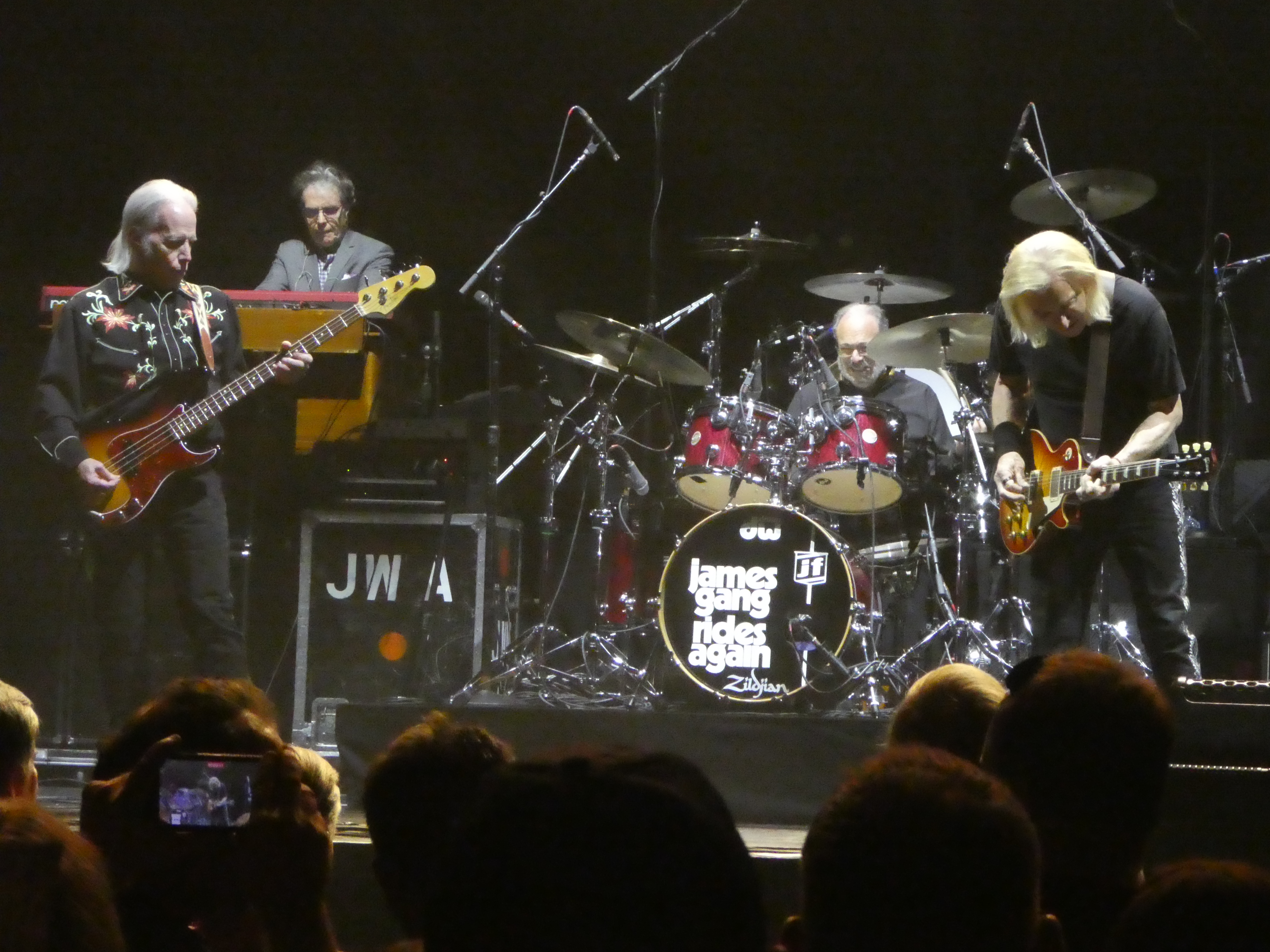
The James Gang performing at VetsAid concert in November 2022

In addition to his work with the James Gang, he has additional session credits with Eric Clapton, B. B. King, Stephen Stills and Chuck Mangione.

2016 brought the release of Sunday Morning Revival, a free-form jam session that was captured on a single Sunday morning in the spring of 1967 and christened decades later as the Schwartz-Fox Blues Crusade. Fox and two other members of the James Gang, guitarist Glenn Schwartz and bassist Tom Kriss, came together with Bill "Mr. Stress" Miller (vocals/harmonica), Rich Kriss (guitars/vocals) and pianist Mike Sands in a small recording studio overlooking Lake Erie. A deep-rooted love for the blues brought the grouping of Cleveland-based musicians together. They spent time playing through a selection of standards by Sonny Boy Williamson II ("Ninety Nine," "Dissatisfied"), Muddy Waters ("Long Distance Call"), Elmore James ("Dust My Broom"), Willie Dixon ("Evil"), among others. As Fox would recollect in an interview at the time the collection was released by Smog Veil Records, their intentions were pure. "We were immersed in the blues, and I thought, 'Wow, wouldn't it be great to get some of this on tape?'"

Fox most recently performed with the James Gang at the VetsAid concert in Columbus, Ohio, on November 13, 2022.

== License plate collection ==
He is an avid collector of automobile license plates, serving as an officer of the Automobile License Plate Collectors Association and authoring the most prominent published work within the hobby, License Plates of the United States (ISBN 1886777004), which was issued initially in 1994.

Fox first became interested in license plates in 1954 when he was seven years old and at one time he had a collection of thirty thousand plates. Fans and friends were always curious about his chosen hobby. "Not everyone can appreciate the fineries of a rusting hunk of old steel," he wrote in his book. Although he would stop collecting for a short period of time in the early 1960s after he became focused on his musical aspirations and drumming, it was not a permanent shift. By the time he was on the road as a touring musician in the late 1960s, he quickly rediscovered his love for license plates.

Although his book covers the history of only United States passenger car license plates, Fox's own interests extend far beyond that; he also collects unusual non-passenger plates domestically and "all types of plates" from other parts of the world. Still based in the Cleveland area, he has a collection of about a thousand plates and remains an active participant in the scene.
