= The Best of Joe Walsh =

Greatest hits album by Joe Walsh
- Released: November 15, 1978
- Recorded: 1970–1978
- Genres: Rock; hard rock
- Length: 41:36
- Label: ABC
- Producers: Joe Walsh; Bill Szymczyk; Joe Vitale
- Compiler: Joe Walsh

Joe Walsh chronology
But Seriously, Folks... (1978)	The Best of Joe Walsh (1978)	There Goes the Neighborhood (1981)

The Best of Joe Walsh is a compilation album by the American singer-songwriter and multi-instrumentalist Joe Walsh. The album was released in late 1978, on the label ABC Records. It features songs from his tenure with the James Gang as well as solo songs. Two tracks from 1974's So What were newly remixed for this compilation; "Turn to Stone" and "Help Me Through the Night".

== Critical reception ==
Professional ratings
Review scores
Source	Rating
Christgau's Record Guide	B−

Village Voice critic Robert Christgau wrote: "'Twixt James Gang and Eagles Walsh justified his existence by developing his own brand of spacey, tuneful guitar schlock. I admit that it sounds like nothing else. But I can't imagine why anyone would want this much of it." Stephen Thomas Erlewine of AllMusic was more enthusiastic and said retrospectively, "this is not even close to a comprehensive collection, but it's not a bad sampler for extremely casual fans."

== Track listing ==
All songs written and composed by Joe Walsh except where noted.

No.	Title	Length
1.	"Turn to Stone" (Walsh, Terry Trebandt)	3:59
2.	"Mother Says" (Walsh, Joe Vitale, Kenny Passarelli)	5:41
3.	"Help Me Thru the Night"	3:51
4.	"Rocky Mountain Way" (Rocke Grace, Passarelli, Vitale, Walsh)	5:15
5.	"Meadows" (Walsh, Patrick Cullie)	4:36
6.	"County Fair"	6:43
7.	"Funk #49" (Jim Fox, Dale Peters, Walsh)	3:54
8.	"Time Out"	4:17
9.	"Walk Away"	3:34

== Personnel ==
- Joe Walsh: Guitars, Lead Guitar, Bass Guitar, Slide Guitar, Pedal Steel Guitar, Piano, Keyboards, Drums, Mandolin, Talkbox, Timpani, Hammond Organ, Percussion, Synthesizer, Vocals.
- Kenny Passarelli: Bass guitar.
- Tom Stephenson: Piano, keyboards, hammond organ.
- Joe Vitale: Drums, keyboards, percussion, timpani.
- Guille Garcia: Percussion.
- Bryan Garofalo: Bass guitar.
- Rocke Grace: Piano.
- Ron "Crunchy" Grinel: Drums.
- J.D. Souther: Vocals.
- Bill Szymczyk: Percussion, Marching Cymbals.
- Joe Vitale: Drums, Percussion, Congas, Timpani, Tambourin, Shaker, Cowbell, Piano, Synthesizer, Keyboards.
- Members of James Gang:
  - Dale Peters: Bass guitar, percussion, vocals.
  - Jim Fox: Drums, percussion, vocals.
- Members of Eagles:
  - Don Felder: Backing vocals, Guitar.
  - Glenn Frey: Backing vocals, Guitar.
  - Randy Meisner: Backing vocals, Bass guitar.
  - Don Henley: Backing vocals, Drums.
  - John Kosh: Art Director, Designer
  - Bob Hickson: Illustrator

== Charts ==
Chart (1978)	Peak position
US Billboard 200	71
