= But Seriously, Folks... =

Studio album by Joe Walsh
- Released: May 16, 1978
- Studios: Bayshore (Coconut Grove, Florida)
- Genres: Rock, hard rock, soft rock
- Length: 35:22
- Label: Asylum
- Producers: Joe Walsh; Bill Szymczyk

Joe Walsh chronology
You Can't Argue with a Sick Mind (1976)	But Seriously, Folks... (1978)	The Best of Joe Walsh (1978)

But Seriously, Folks... is the fourth studio album by the American singer-songwriter and multi-instrumentalist Joe Walsh. The album was released in mid-1978, on the Asylum label. It included the satirical song "Life's Been Good". The original 8:04 (8:57 on CD releases with a speech at the end) album version of this track was edited down to 4:35 for the single release, and this became Walsh's biggest solo hit, peaking at No. 12 on the Billboard Hot 100.

The album also featured the other four members of the Eagles – which Walsh had joined two years earlier – as well as singer-keyboardist Jay Ferguson, a former member of the groups Spirit and Jo Jo Gunne (who co-wrote one track on the album), drummer Joe Vitale from Walsh's former band Barnstorm, and bassist Willie Weeks.

== Critical reception ==
Professional ratings
Review scores
Source	Rating
AllMusic	4.5/5 stars
Christgau's Record Guide	C+

In a contemporary review for The Village Voice, Robert Christgau wrote that, although Walsh has "a gift for tuneful guitar schlock", most of the album's songs fall "far short of the irreverent shuck-and-jive" of "Life's Been Good". In a retrospective review, AllMusic's Al Campbell said that the album is "Joe Walsh's most insightful and melodic", and "captures a reflective song cycle along the same thematic lines of Pet Sounds, only for the '70s".

Cash Box said that the single "Over and Over" "has several distinctive rhythmic breaks, organ backing, swirling guitar work, slip and slide beat and good double-tracked vocals" and praised Walsh's slide guitar solo.

== Track listing ==
All songs written and composed by Joe Walsh, with additional writers noted.

No.	Title	Writer(s)	Length
1.	"Over and Over"		4:53
2.	"Second Hand Store"	Mike Murphy	3:35
3.	"Indian Summer"		3:03
4.	"At the Station"	Joe Vitale	5:08
5.	"Tomorrow"		3:39
6.	"Inner Tube"		1:25
7.	"Theme from Boat Weirdos"	Vitale, Jay Ferguson, Willie Weeks, Bill Szymczyk	4:43
8.	"Life's Been Good" (Life's Been Good ends at 8:04 and is followed by an untitled hidden track that runs for 42 seconds)		8:56
Total length:			35:22

== Personnel ==
Musicians

- Joe Walsh – vocals, synthesizers, guitars
- Jay Ferguson – keyboards
- Joe Vitale – synthesizers, drums, percussion, flute, backing vocals (1–4, 7, 8)
- Joey Murcia – 2nd guitar
- Willie Weeks – bass

Guest musicians

- Don Felder – pedal steel guitar (2), guitar (4)
- Bill Szymczyk – tambourine (4), backing vocals (8)
- Jody Boyer – backing vocals (2, 3, 8)
- Glenn Frey – background vocal arrangements and backing vocals (5)
- Don Henley – backing vocals (5)
- Timothy B. Schmit – backing vocals (5)

Production

- Bill Szymczyk – producer, engineer, digital remastering
- Ed Mashal – engineer
- Ted Jensen – mastering
- Jimmy Wachtel – album design, cover photography, sleeve photography
- Michael Curtis – design assistant
- Mark Foltz – design assistant
- Jage Jackson – design assistant
- Lorrie Sullivan – sleeve photography
- Recorded at Bayshore Studios (Coconut Grove, Florida)
- Mastered at Sterling Sound (New York City, New York)

== Charts ==
Chart (1978)	Peak position
Australian Albums (Kent Music Report)	31
Canada Top Albums/CDs (RPM)	9
Dutch Albums (Album Top 100)	46
New Zealand Albums (RMNZ)	10
UK Albums (Official Charts)	16
US Billboard 200	8

== Certifications ==
Region	Certification	Certified units/sales
Canada (Music Canada)	Platinum	100,000^{^}
United Kingdom (BPI)	Silver	60,000^{^}
United States (RIAA)	Platinum	1,000,000^{^}
^{^} Shipments figures based on certification alone.
