= Jimmy Wachtel =

American cover artist

Jimmy Wachtel is an American photographer, art director and designer based in Los Angeles. He has designed album covers for big artists such as Joe Walsh, Bruce Springsteen, Bob Dylan, Michael Stanley, Jo Jo Gunne, John Cougar, and Buckingham Nicks, among others.

He is the older brother of guitarist Waddy Wachtel.

== Album covers designed by Wachtel ==
- The Cowsills - II x II (1970)
- Cymbal And Clinger – Cymbal And Clinger (1972)
- Joe Walsh – The Smoker You Drink, The Player You Get (1973)
- Curt Boetcher – There's an Innocent Face (1973)
- Dave Mason – It's Like You Never Left (1973)
- Judi Pulver – Pulver Rising (1973)
- Buckingham Nicks – Buckingham Nicks (1973)
- Kracker - Kracker Brand (1973)
- Bill Wyman – Monkey Grip (1974)
- Joe Walsh – So What (1974)
- Kris Kristofferson – Spooky Lady's Sideshow (1974)
- Jo Jo Gunne – So...Where's The Show? (1974)
- REO Speedwagon – Lost in a Dream (1974)
- Souther–Hillman–Furay Band – The Souther-Hillman-Furay Band (1974)
- James Gang – Miami (1974)
- Stepson - Stepson (1974)
- Michael Stanley Band – You Break It...You Bought It! (1975)
- Tommy Bolin – Teaser (1975)
- Warren Zevon – Warren Zevon (1976)
- Tommy Bolin – Private Eyes (1976)
- Joe Walsh – You Can't Argue with a Sick Mind (1976)
- JD Souther – Black Rose (1976)
- Flora Purim – Open Your Eyes You Can Fly (1976)
- Jackson Browne – Running on Empty (1977)
- Alan O'Day – Appetizers (1977)
- Warren Zevon – Excitable Boy (1978)
- Joe Walsh – But Seriously, Folks... (1978)
- Airborne - Airborne (1979)
- Blue Steel – No More Lonely Nights (1979)
- Warren Zevon – Stand in the Fire (1980)
- Jackson Browne – Hold Out (1980)
- John Cougar – Nothin' Matters and What If It Did (1980)
- Bruce Springsteen – The River (1980)
- Ronin - Ronin (1980)
- David Lindley – El Rayo-X (1981)
- Joe Vitale – Plantation Harbor (1981)
- Gary U.S. Bonds – Dedication (1981)
- Warren Zevon – The Envoy (1982)
- David Lindley and El Rayo-X – Win This Record! (1982)
- Greg Copeland – Revenge Will Come (1982)
- Crosby, Stills & Nash – Daylight Again (1982)
- Crosby, Stills & Nash – Allies (1983)
- The Hollies – What Goes Around... (1983)
- Jackson Browne – Lawyers in Love (1983)
- Champaign – Woman In Flames (1984)
- Bruce Springsteen & The E-Street Band – Live/1975–85 (1986)
- Jackson Browne – Lives in the Balance (1986)
- Graham Nash – Innocent Eyes (1986)
- Survivor – When Seconds Count (1986)
- Warren Zevon – Transverse City (1989)
- Crosby, Stills & Nash – Live It Up (1990)
- Stevie Nicks – Timespace: The Best of Stevie Nicks (1991)
- Bob Dylan – Good as I Been to You (1992)
