= Thunder Island =

Thunder Island may refer to:

- Thunder Island (album), a 1977 album by Jay Ferguson
- "Thunder Island" (song), a 1977 song by Jay Ferguson
- Thunder Island (1963 film), an American action film
- Thunder Island (1921 film), an American silent adventure film
