= You Can't Argue with a Sick Mind =

Live album by Joe Walsh
- Released: March 1976
- Recorded: November 26, 1975
- Venue: Santa Monica Civic Auditorium for Don Kirshner's Rock Concert
- Genres: Rock; hard rock; pop rock; blues rock
- Length: 35:09
- Label: ABC
- Producer: Joe Walsh

Joe Walsh chronology
So What (1974)	You Can't Argue with a Sick Mind (1976)	But Seriously, Folks... (1978)

You Can't Argue with a Sick Mind is a live solo album by the American singer-songwriter and multi-instrumentalist Joe Walsh. The album was released in March 1976 as Walsh's last album for ABC Records. It was recorded live just before Walsh joined the Eagles. Three members of that group appear on the song "Help Me Through the Night".

== Recording ==
The album was compiled from recordings taken from a taping of Don Kirshner's Rock Concert, filmed on November 26, 1975. The episode was titled "Joe Walsh and Friends" and featured various additional artists, including some of Walsh's soon-to-be Eagles bandmates. Out of the six tracks on the album, five were taken from the broadcast, while "Time Out" was a new release. Songs performed on the episode that did not appear on the album included Walsh's "Welcome to the Club," Barnstorm's "Mother Says," and covers of the Beatles' "Get Back" and the Spencer Davis Groups' "Gimme Some Lovin'".

== Critical reception ==
Professional ratings
Review scores
Source	Rating
AllMusic	3.5/5 stars

Writing retrospectively for AllMusic, critic James Chrispell wrote of the album "Recorded live just before Joe Walsh joined up with the Eagles full-time... you've got one heck of a Joe Walsh concert souvenir."

== Release history ==
The album was reissued in 1979 by MCA Records. In 2011 the album was reissued in Japan in a miniature replica sleeve in the SHM-CD format.

== Track listing ==
No.	Title	Writer(s)	Length
1.	"Walk Away"	Joe Walsh	3:21
2.	"Meadows"	Patrick Cullie, Walsh	7:08
3.	"Rocky Mountain Way"	Rocke Grace, Kenny Passarelli, Joe Vitale, Walsh	7:40
4.	"Time Out"	Terry Trebandt, Walsh	4:22
5.	"Help Me Through the Night" (Features Glenn Frey, Don Felder and Don Henley on vocals)	Walsh	3:43
6.	"Turn to Stone"	Trebandt, Walsh	8:46
Total length:			35:09

== Personnel ==
- Joe Walsh – guitars, vocals
- Jay Ferguson – keyboards
- David Mason – keyboards
- Don Felder – guitar, vocals (5)
- Willie Weeks – bass guitar
- Andy Newmark – drums
- Joe Vitale – drums, flute (Turn To Stone)
- Rocky Dzidzornu – percussion
- Glenn Frey – vocals (5)
- Don Henley – vocals (5)

== Production ==
- Joe Walsh – producer
- Tom Flye – engineer
- John Stronach – mixing
- Alex Sadkin – mastering
- Jimmy Wachtel – art direction, design, group photography
- Amanda Flick – additional artwork
- Lorrie Sullivan – photography
- Irving Azoff – management

== Charts ==
Chart (1976)	Peak position
Australian Albums (Kent Music Report)	85
Dutch Albums (Album Top 100)	13
New Zealand Albums (RMNZ)	19
UK Albums (Official Charts)	28
US Billboard 200	20
