= Turn to Stone (Joe Walsh and Barnstorm song) =

1972 song by Joe Walsh

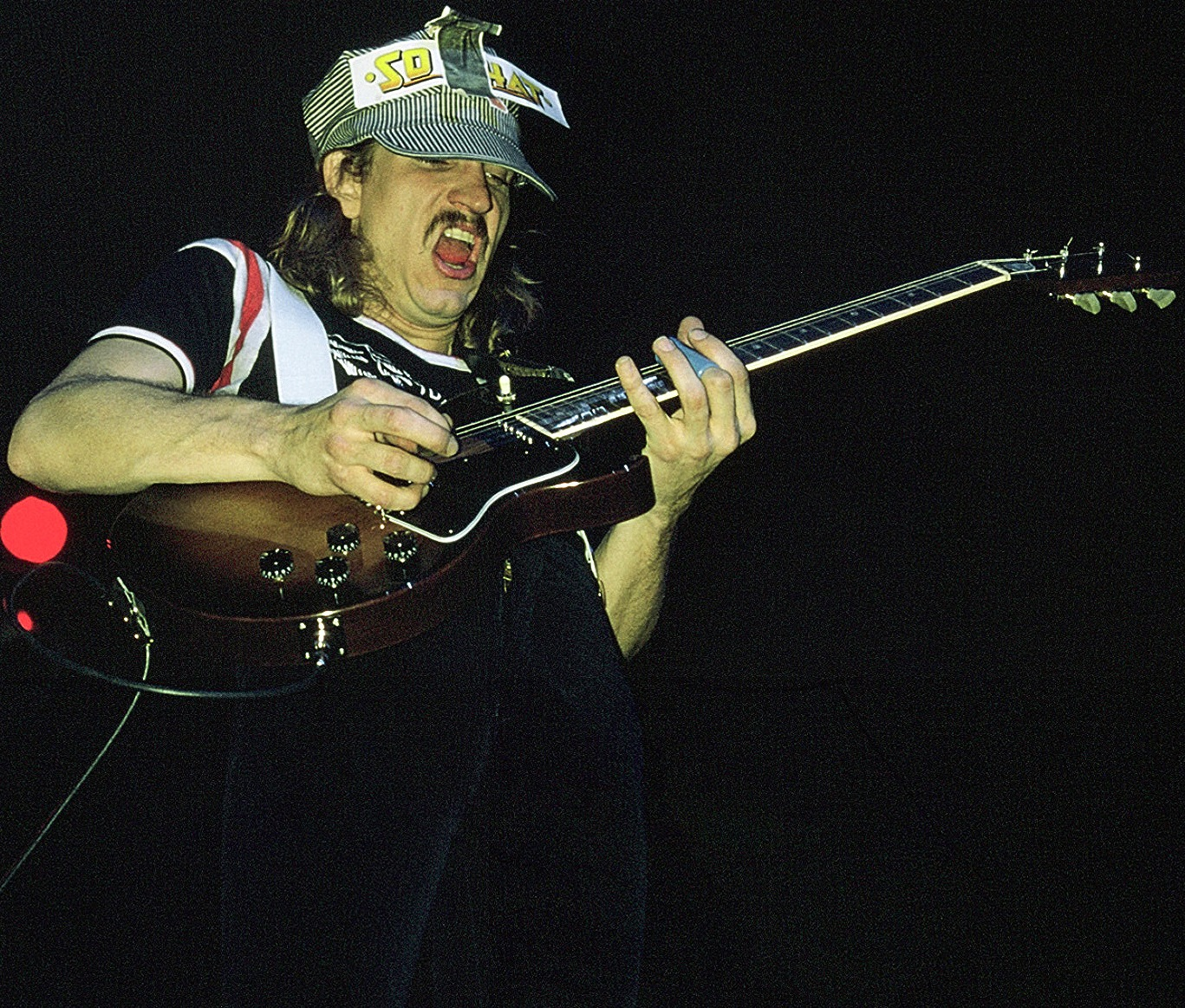
- Joe Walsh

Song by Joe Walsh and Barnstorm

from the album Barnstorm
- Released: 1972
- Length: 5:16
- Label: ABC-Dunhill
- Songwriters: Terry Trebandt, Joe Walsh
- Producer: Bill Szymczyk

"Turn to Stone"

Single by Joe Walsh

from the album So What
- B-side: "All Night Laundry Mat Blues"
- Released: February 1975
- Length: 3:30
- Label: ABC-Dunhill
- Songwriter: Joe Walsh
- Producers: Joe Walsh, John Stronach

"Turn to Stone" is a 1972 song by the American singer-songwriter Joe Walsh and his band Barnstorm, with writing credits given to Terry Trabandt and Walsh. It was originally released on the album Barnstorm.

Walsh later covered the song on his 1974 solo album So What, and released it as a single. Cash Box said that it showed off Walsh's "pyrotechnic guitar abilities" and commented on the "broad, swooping chords and accented rhythm section." Record World said that "simultaneously realistic and reticent message lyrics blend with a rock symphony on its own terms." The single peaked at #93 on the US Billboard chart.

In 1976, Walsh recorded it on his You Can't Argue with a Sick Mind live album.

The Eagles played the song frequently on their Hotel California and The Long Run tours between 1976 and 1980.

In a Rolling Stone magazine interview Joe Walsh said this about the song meaning, "'Turn to Stone' was written about the Nixon administration and the Vietnam War and the protesting that was going on and all of that. It's a song about frustration. Also, I attended Kent State. I was at the shootings. That fueled it, too. In those days it felt like the government’s priority was not the population. They had an agenda that was about something other than doing what was necessarily good for the country."

== Cover versions ==
- Roy Buchanan covered the song on his 1978 album You're Not Alone.
- Crippled Black Phoenix covered the song on their 2016 album Bronze with guest vocals from Arvid Jonsson
- Kenny Wayne Shepherd covered the song on his 2019 release, The Traveler and the 2020 release Straight to You: Live (track 9)
- Fireball Ministry covered the song on the 2006 Small Stone Records compilation Sucking the 70's - Back in the Saddle Again
