= Rocky Mountain Way =

Single by Joe Walsh

from the album The Smoker You Drink, the Player You Get
- B-side: "(Day Dream) Prayer"
- Released: 1973
- Recorded: 1973
- Genre: Blues rock
- Length: 5:17 (album version); 3:39 (single version)
- Label: ABC-Dunhill
- Songwriters: Joe Walsh; Joe Vitale; Rocke Grace; Kenny Passarelli
- Producers: Joe Walsh; Bill Szymczyk

Joe Walsh singles chronology
"Rocky Mountain Way" (1973)	"Meadows" (1974)

Official audio
- Rocky Mountain Way on YouTube

"Rocky Mountain Way" is a 1973 song by American rock guitarist Joe Walsh and his band Barnstorm, with writing credits given to all four band members: Walsh, Rocke Grace, Kenny Passarelli, and Joe Vitale. The song was originally released on Walsh's second solo studio album The Smoker You Drink, the Player You Get.

== Writing ==
Walsh appeared in studio on The Howard Stern Show on June 12, 2012, and talked about how the lyrics to the song came to him in 1972 shortly after releasing his debut solo studio album, Barnstorm.

"I'm living in Colorado and I'm mowing the lawn. I look up and there's the Front Range of the Rocky Mountains and there's snow on them in the summer. And it knocked me back because it was just beautiful. And I thought, 'Well I have committed. I'm already in Colorado and it's too late to regret the James Gang. The Rocky Mountain way is better than the way I had, because the music was better.' I got the words. Bam!"

Walsh has varied that story over the years, however, telling the Rocky Mountain News that he wrote the lyrics while recording the album at Caribou Ranch Recording Studio. The song features Walsh using a guitar talk box manufactured by audio and radio engineer Bob Heil, inventor of the Heil high-powered talk box. The distinct tone "... gives Walsh's blues stomp a futuristic wave, as if a hulking mechanical beast was looming just over those rocky mountains."

The song was used as the title to Walsh's 1985 compilation album, which featured previously released singles and tracks from his albums Barnstorm (1972), The Smoker You Drink, the Player You Get (1973) and So What (1974).

== Production ==
In Jake Brown's book Behind the Boards II (2014), record producer Bill Szymczyk writes about how Walsh first came up with an instrumental "blues-shuffle" recorded at the Criteria studio, then stripped down to drums alone at the Caribou studio and rebuilt from there, adding lyrics to make the final version. Walsh is described as having layered about "six or seven" guitars on the recording, playing through a small amp with one Shure SM57 microphone aimed at it. Szymczyk says the thick guitar sound is from Walsh himself, not from studio trickery. Walsh's distinctive nasal voice was noticeably saturated in the recording with double tracking and a talk box was used to alter the guitar solo.

== Chart history ==
Chart (1973)	Peak position
Australia (Kent Music Report)	39
Canada RPM Top Singles	31
U.S. Billboard Hot 100	23
U.S. Cashbox Top 100	13

Chart (1977)	Peak position
UK singles chart	39

== Live versions ==
In 1976, Walsh recorded the song on his You Can't Argue with a Sick Mind solo album.

Walsh played the song frequently while on tour with the Eagles, including the 1977 Hotel California Tour, again in 1979 and later into the first half of 1980's Long Run tour, also being added yet again to the set in the 1994 reunion tour with Eagles.

In 1985, Walsh joined Australian rock supergroup, the Party Boys, and while touring they recorded a live album, You Need Professional Help, which featured an extended guitar duel between Walsh and Kevin Borich on "Rocky Mountain Way".

In 1989, Walsh played an eight-minute version in the Ringo Starr's All-Starr Band, starting with a slide arrangement of "Amazing Grace."

In October 19, 1991 Joe Walsh performed this song with Brian May of Queen, Steve Vai, Joe Satriani and Nuno Bettencourt of Extreme at the Guitar Legends concert in Seville, Spain.

In 2004 it was sung by Walsh at Crossroads Guitar Festival and along with Eagles on their Farewell I Tour.

In 2010, "Rocky Mountain Way" was one of three songs played during the encore each night during the Eagles' Long Road Out of Eden Tour. The other two songs performed in the encore were "Desperado" and "Take It Easy".

In 2012, "Rocky Mountain Way" was the first of six songs performed live by Walsh in the Joe Walsh episode (episode 60) of Live from Daryl's House, which also includes discussion of the song.

On May 24, 2016, Walsh performed "Rocky Mountain Way" on the season 10 finale of the NBC reality television singing competition The Voice, along with contestant Laith Al-Saadi.

== Other uses ==
The Colorado Rockies Major League Baseball franchise has played the song after every home win at Coors Field since 1995.

The Denver Broncos currently play the Godsmack cover version of the song during home games at Empower Field at Mile High.
