= Jo Jo Gunne (album) =

Studio album by Jo Jo Gunne
- Released: February 7, 1972
- Recorded: 1971–1972
- Genre: Hard rock
- Label: Asylum
- Producers: Jo Jo Gunne; additional production by Tom Dowd

Jo Jo Gunne chronology
Jo Jo Gunne (1972)	Bite Down Hard (1973)

Professional ratings
Review scores
Source	Rating
AllMusic	4.5/5 stars
Christgau's Record Guide	B+

Jo Jo Gunne is the debut album from rock/hard rock band Jo Jo Gunne, formed after keyboardist/vocalist Jay Ferguson and bassist/vocalist Mark Andes left Spirit. "Run Run Run", released as the album's first single ("Shake That Fat" was the second), became a top 10 hit in the United Kingdom and received airplay on US AOR radio stations.

== Track listing ==
- All songs written by Jay Ferguson, except where noted.
1. "Run Run Run" (Ferguson, Matt Andes) 2:33
2. "Shake that Fat" (Ferguson, Andes) 3:44
3. "Babylon" 4:05
4. "I Make Love" 2:54
5. "Barstow Blue Eyes" 3:18
6. "99 Days" 3:20
7. "Academy Award" 4:58
8. "Take it Easy" (Ferguson, Andes) 4:47
9. "Flying Home" 3:12

== Charts ==
Chart (1972)	Peak position
Australia (Kent Music Report)	18
Canada Top Albums/CDs (RPM)	55
US Billboard 200	57

== Personnel ==
Jo Jo Gunne

- Jay Ferguson – lead vocals, keyboards
- Matthew "Matt" Andes – guitars, backing vocals
- Mark Andes – bass, backing vocals
- William "Curly" Smith – drums, backing vocals, percussion, harmonica

== Production ==
- Arranged by Jo Jo Gunne
- Produced by Jo Jo Gunne, with additional production by Tom Dowd
- Recorded and mixed by Chris Hinshaw
- Remixed by Tom Dowd
- All songs published by Hollenbeck Music, except tracks 1, 2 and 8 (Hollenbeck Music/Bulge Music)
