= List of Asylum Records artists =

This is a list of current and former artists for Asylum Records.
An asterisk (*) denotes an artist who no longer records for the label.

== # ==
- 9th Wonder (It's A Wonderful World/Asylum Records)

== A ==
- Alesha Dixon*
- Karen Alexander
- Anne-Marie
- A1k PG RA (rapper)*

== B ==
- Bun B (Rap-A-Lot/Asylum)
- Tyra B
- Batdorf & Rodney
- David Blue
- Bohagon
- Bone Thugs-n-Harmony
- Boosie Badazz
- Terence Boylan
- Lee Brice (Asylum-Curb)
- Jackson Browne*
- Brother Phelps
- Lindsey Buckingham (US/Canada)*
- Tim Buckley*
- The Byrds*
- ByrdGang (ByrdGang/Asylum Records)

== C ==
- Cadillac Don & J-Money
- Call Me No One (7 Bros/Asylum)
- Cam'Ron (Diplomats/Asylum)
- Cate Brothers
- Keith Carradine*
- Cene (F.I.R.M. Grip/Asylum)
- Charli XCX* (Atlantic/Asylum)
- Chingo Bling
- Chopper City Boyz (Chopper City/Asylum)
- Gene Clark
- Joel Corry
- C-Murder (Tru/Asylum)
- Melodie Crittenden
- Cowboy Crush (Asylum-Curb)
- Creed
- Crime Mob
- Curren$y (Warner Bros/Asylum)

== D ==
- Stephanie Davis
- Curtis Day
- D4L
- Diamond
- Shea Diamond
- D-Rod* (Rap Artist) (Asylum)
- Ned Doheny
- Dolf (Rapper)
- Bob Dylan* (US/Canada)
- Devin The Dude (Asylum/Rap A Lot)
- Dice SoHo (Asylum/MWA)
- Dolo Tonight
- Bob Dylan*

== E ==
- Eagles*
- Ed Sheeran*
- E-40 (Sick Wid It/BME/Asylum/Warner Bros.)
- Ella Henderson

== F ==
- Dick Feller
- Don Felder*
- Glenn Frey*
- Jay Ferguson
- John Fogerty*
- Fat Trel (Slutty Boyz/MGE The Label/Asylum)
- Foxx (Trill Ent./Asylum)
- Frayser Boy (Hypnotize Minds/Asylum)
- Richie Furay
- Nelly Furtado (Geffen/Asylum/Elektra/WSM)

== G ==
- Gene Clark
- Geto Boys (Rap-A-Lot/Asylum)
- Bob Gibson
- Ginuwine (Notifi/Asylum/Warner Bros.)
- Louise Goffin
- Andrew Gold
- Steve Goodman
- Gucci Mane (Brick Squad/Asylum/Warner Bros.)
- General Geezy (Leesburg/Asylum/Warner Bros.)

== H ==
- John Hall
- Jan Hammer
- Emmylou Harris
- Don Henley*
- Chris Hillman
- Greg Holland

== I ==
- ILoveMakonnen (GOPPOPO/Asylum/Warner Bros.)
- Ironik
- Iyaz (Beluga Heights/Reprise/Asylum/Warner Bros.)
- idontknowjeffery (Above The Law/Asylum)

== J ==
- Chris Jagger
- Mark Jepson (& Deb Jepson-Xenides)
- Jo Jo Gunne
- Mike Jones* (Ice Age Ent./Asylum/Warner Bros. Rec.)
- JR Writer* (Diplomat/Warner Bros. Rec.)
- Jason Derulo (Beluiga Heights/Asylum/Warner Bros. Rec.)
- Jay Rock (Topdawg Ent./Asylum)

== K ==
- Kandi Burruss (Kandi Koated/Asylum Records)
- Kadalack Boyz (D-Lo Entertainment/ColliPark/Asylum Records)
- King Co (Clover G/Southside Ryda Ent./Asylum Records
- Kiotti
- Kirko Bangz (LMG/Asylum/Warner Bros.)
- KLC
- Korgis
- Kyuss
- Willie The Kid (Aphilliates/Asylum)

== L ==
- Lil Wyte (Hypnotize Minds/Asylum)
- Lil' Flip (Clover G/Asylum/Warner Bros. Rec.)
- Lil' Wil (Rudebwoy/Unauthorized/Asylum)
- Lil Scrappy (G's Up/Asylum/Reprise)
- Lil' Cali (Yz'Gyz Ent/Mvp/Asylum)
- Lil’ Smithy
- Dennis Linde
- Lil' Tazz (BigDawg Ent/GoBoy music)
- Lil' Phat (Trill Ent./Asylum)
- Lil Kayla
- Lou Bliss (LBMusic/Asylum)
- Lyfe Jennings (Jesus Swings/Asylum/Warner Bros. Rec.)

== M ==
- Maisie Peters
- Majid Jordan (Asylum/OVOSOUND)
- Lila McCann
- Metallica
- Metal Church
- Joni Mitchell
- Tim Moore
- J.D. Myers
- McLean
- Morgan Connie Smith
- Mami Kawada

== N ==
- Mark Nesler
- New Boyz (Shotty Rec./Asylum/Warner Bros. Rec.)

== O ==
- OB O'Brien (OVO Sound/Asylum)
- OJ Da Juiceman (So Icey/32 Ent/Mizay Ent/Asylum)
- Oowee
- Orleans
- Outasight (Select Records/Asylum)

== P ==
- Parade*
- Partners-N-Crime (UTP/Asylum)
- PartyNextDoor (OVO Sound/Asylum/Warner Bros.)
- Pimp C (Rap-A-Lot/Asylum)
- Polo Boy (Asylum)
- Project Pat (Asylum)
- Prynce (O.F.F Records)

== R ==
- Terry Radigan
- Rudimental
- Linda Ronstadt*
- Royal Wade Kimes

== S ==
- Sevendust (7 Bros/Asylum)
- Kevin Sharp
- Judee Sill
- John David Souther
- Souther-Hillman-Furay Band
- Sada Baby (Skuba-Sharpshooter)
- Scarface (rapper) (Rap-A-Lot/Asylum)

== T ==
- Tim Moore
- Tom Waits*
- Tortur3 T (Heavy Muscle, LLC/Asylum)
- Traffic (US/Canada)

== U ==
- UTP
- Ugly God

== V ==
- Joe Vitale

== W ==
- Tom Waits
- Waka Flocka Flame
- Clay Walker (Asylum-Curb)
- Paul Wall (Asylum/Atlantic/Swishahouse)
- Joe Walsh
- Jacky Ward
- Jimmy Webb
- Webbie (Trill Ent./Asylum/Atlantic)
- Bryan White
- Hank Williams, Jr. (Asylum-Curb)
- Bob Woodruff*
- Nicole Wray
- Wu-Tang Clan
- Wynonna (Asylum-Curb)

== Y ==
- Yonaka
- Yo-Yo
- Yukmouth (Smoke-A-Lot Rec./Rap-A-Lot Rec./Asylum)
- Young Problemz (Rap Group) (Unauthorized/Asylum)

== Z ==
- Z-Ro (Rap-A-Lot/Asylum)
- Warren Zevon*
