= American Dream (Crosby, Stills, Nash & Young song) =

Single by Crosby, Stills, Nash & Young

from the album American Dream
- B-side: "Compass"
- Released: 1988
- Recorded: March 3, 1988
- Studio: Redwood Digital, Woodside, California
- Length: 3:15
- Label: Atlantic
- Songwriter: Neil Young
- Producers: Niko Bolas; Crosby, Stills, Nash & Young

Crosby, Stills, Nash & Young singles chronology
"Raise a Voice" (1983)	"American Dream" (1988)	"Got It Made" (1989)

"American Dream" is a song by Crosby, Stills, Nash & Young, featured as the opening track on their 1988 album of the same name. It was released as the first single from the album, where it charted in the United States, the United Kingdom, Australia, Canada.

== Background ==
Young first performed "American Dream" in an acoustic arrangement on his 1987 tour before re-recording it with a fuller arrangement on March 3, 1988. Lyrically, the song was inspired by the Iran–Contra affair and the failed presidential bid of US senator Gary Hart, who exited the 1988 Democratic Party presidential primaries after the press discovered that he had an extramarital affair with a younger model. "American Dream" features the sounds of high-pitched woodwinds, handclaps, and vocal harmonies.

== Release ==
"American Dream" was released by Atlantic Records in 1988 with "Compass" as the B-side on all editions of the single, with "Soldiers of Peace" also included on the twelve-inch single. During the week of November 4, 1988, Radio & Records reported that the song was added to 145 of its album oriented rock radio stations across the United States, amounting to 83% of all stations within that format.

The song's music video was directed by Julien Temple and produced by Amanda Temple in Los Angeles. Julien Temple assigned each member to different roles, with Crosby taking on a figure resembling Larry Flynt, Stills taking on the role of "a coked out Oliver North", Nash depicting Gary Hart, and Young doubling up as a tabloid journalist and heavy metal fan.

== Critical reception ==
Jerry Smith of Music Week called "American Dream" a "surprisingly catchy number with [a] finger clicking beat and highly hummable harmonies". Cashbox called the title track "the best thing out of CSN or Y since Deja Vu." They also commented on the "tasty brew of harmonies" and thought that "the biggest disappointment here is the quick fade." Billboard described the song as "satirical commentary on the current political scene."

== Personnel ==
- Neil Young – lead vocals, electric guitar
- Stephen Stills – keyboards
- Bob Glaub – bass
- Joe Vitale – drums
- Niko Bolas – handclaps
- Tim Mulligan – handclaps
- Tim Foster – handclaps
- Brentley Walton – handclaps

== Charts ==
Chart (1988–1989)	Peak position
Australia (Kent Music Report)	53
Canadian Top Singles (RPM)	3
European Airplay (Music & Media)	21
UK Singles (Official Charts)	55
US Billboard Adult Contemporary	49
US Billboard Album Rock Tracks	4
