= Lady on the Rock =

Single by Joe Vitale

from the album Plantation Harbor
- A-side: "Lady on the Rock (It's America)"
- B-side: "Plantation Harbor"
- Released: 1981
- Recorded: 1979–1980
- Studio: Bayshore Recording (Coconut Grove, Florida); Rudy Records (Los Angeles, California); Santa Barbara Sound (Santa Barbara, California); The Vinylrosa (Little Switzerland, North Carolina); Home-Brew Studio (The Third Ring of Venus)
- Genre: Rock; pop rock
- Length: 5:30
- Label: Asylum - E-47210- A
- Songwriters: Joe Vitale; Bill Szymczyk; Stephen Stills
- Producer: Bill Szymczyk

"Lady on the Rock" is a song written by Joe Vitale, Bill Szymczyk and Stephen Stills. The song was released in 1981 as a single from Vitale's second solo studio album, Plantation Harbor (1981), and reached number 47 on the Billboard Mainstream Rock chart. The track is titled "Lady on the Rock (It's America)" on the single release.

The track is a patriotic anthem about the Statue of Liberty, and how America is the land of the free.

The song received some airplay in the US on album-oriented rock radio and became quite popular. This airplay pushed the single to No. 47 on the Mainstream Rock Tracks and helped the album Plantation Harbor chart.

== Personnel ==
Musicians

- Joe Vitale – lead and backing vocals, drums, percussion, synthesizer, spoken word
- George "Chocolate" Perry – bass guitar
- Paul Harris – clavinet
- Joe Walsh – lead and rhythm guitars, spoken word
- Don Felder – rhythm guitar
- Marilyn "Mini" Martin – backing vocals
