= Daylight Again =

Studio album by Crosby, Stills & Nash
- Released: June 21, 1982 (U.S.)
- Recorded: 1980–1981
- Studios: Rudy Records; Devonshire Sound and Sea West
- Genre: Rock
- Length: 39:50
- Label: Atlantic
- Producers: David Crosby, Stephen Stills, Graham Nash

Crosby, Stills & Nash chronology
Replay (1980)	Daylight Again (1982)	Allies (1983)

Singles from Daylight Again
- 1. "Wasted on the Way" Released: June 1982; 2. "Southern Cross" Released: September 1982; 3. "Too Much Love to Hide" Released: January 1983

Professional ratings
Review scores
Source	Rating
Allmusic	3/5 stars
The Music Box	3/5 stars

Daylight Again is the fourth studio album by Crosby, Stills & Nash and their third studio album in the trio configuration. It peaked at No. 8 on the Billboard 200 albums chart, the final time the band made the top ten before the death of David Crosby in 2023. Three singles were released from the album, all making the Billboard Hot 100: "Wasted on the Way" peaked at No. 9, "Southern Cross" at No. 18 and "Too Much Love to Hide" at No. 69. The album was certified platinum by the RIAA with sales of 1,850,000.

== Background ==
The genesis of the album lies in recordings made by Stephen Stills and Graham Nash at intervals in 1980 and 1981 and the album was originally slated to be a Stills–Nash project. They employed Art Garfunkel, Timothy B. Schmit and Mike Finnigan to sing in place of where David Crosby might have been. Executives at Atlantic Records, however, had little interest in anything but CSN product from any member of the group and held out for the presence of Crosby, forcing Nash and Stills to start paying for the sessions out-of-pocket. They began to turn toward the company's point of view and decided to invite Crosby to participate at the eleventh hour.

Crosby brought two tracks to the album: "Delta", where Stills and Nash squeezed their vocals into Crosby's already-taped multi-tracked harmonies and "Might As Well Have a Good Time", which received the bona fide Crosby, Stills & Nash treatment. Most of the recording, however, features other voices in addition to the main trio, a first for any CSNY record as is the number of outside writers. Graham Nash wrote the album's biggest hit, "Wasted on the Way", about the time the group spent in squabbles and diversions rather than concentrating on their music. The second single, "Southern Cross", was Stills' partial rewrite of a song by brothers Richard and Michael Curtis. The song "Daylight Again" evolved out of Stills' guitar-picking to accompany on-stage stories regarding the South in the Civil War, segueing into "Find the Cost of Freedom", which had been the B-side of the "Ohio" single in 1970.

Daylight Again was the band's first album in the video age and a video was filmed for "Southern Cross" featuring the band and one of their favorite metaphors, a sailing vessel. It received a fair amount of rotation on MTV in 1982 and 1983, and helped to propel the album's sales.

The album has been released on compact disc on three occasions: an initial time in the 1980s, remastered using the original master tapes by Ocean View Digital and reissued on September 20, 1994, and again remastered using the HDCD process and reissued by Rhino Records on January 24, 2006, with four bonus tracks.

== Track listing ==
Side one
No.	Title	Writer(s)	Length
1.	"Turn Your Back on Love"	Stephen Stills; Graham Nash; Michael Stergis	4:51
2.	"Wasted on the Way"	Nash	2:52
3.	"Southern Cross"	Stills; Richard Curtis; Michael Curtis	4:41
4.	"Into the Darkness"	Nash	3:23
5.	"Delta"	David Crosby	4:15

Side two
No.	Title	Writer(s)	Length
1.	"Since I Met You"	Stills; Stergis	3:12
2.	"Too Much Love to Hide"	Stills; Gerry Tolman	3:58
3.	"Song for Susan"	Nash	3:08
4.	"You Are Alive"	Stills; Stergis	3:04
5.	"Might As Well Have a Good Time"	Judy Henske; Craig Doerge	4:28
6.	"Daylight Again/Find the Cost of Freedom"	Stills	2:36

2006 bonus tracks
No.	Title	Writer(s)	Notes	Length
12.	"Raise a Voice"	Nash; Stills	originally released on Allies	2:34
13.	"Feel Your Love"	Stills; Nash	outtake	4:28
14.	"Tomorrow Is Another Day"	Stills	outtake	4:05
15.	"Might As Well Have a Good Time"	Henske; Doerge	Crosby demo	4:15

== Personnel ==
Crosby, Stills & Nash

- David Crosby – vocals, keyboards (5)
- Stephen Stills – vocals, Rhodes piano (1, 6), electric guitar (1, 3, 4, 6, 7, 9, 12–14), acoustic guitar (2, 3, 11), Yamaha CP-30 analog stage piano (6), percussion (7), banjo (11), keyboards (12)
- Graham Nash – vocals, electric guitar (1, 4), organ (4), percussion (7), acoustic piano (8), harmonica (9)

Additional musicians

- Mike Finnigan – organ (1, 7, 10, 13, 14), additional vocals (1, 3, 4, 6, 7, 9), Yamaha CP-30 analog stage piano (3), electric piano (4), acoustic piano (7), keyboards (9)
- Craig Doerge – synthesizers (1, 5, 8, 14), keyboards (2, 5, 12), Rhodes piano (8), acoustic piano (10, 14, 15)
- Richard T. Bear – acoustic piano (3), synthesizers (3)
- Jay Ferguson – organ (8)
- James Newton Howard – keyboards (12)
- Michael Stergis – electric guitar (1, 4, 7, 13, 14), acoustic guitar (2, 3, 6, 8, 9)
- Joel Bernstein – acoustic guitar (2, 8), electric guitar (8)
- Dean Parks – electric guitar (5)
- Gerry Tolman – electric guitar (6)
- Danny Kortchmar – electric guitar (12)
- George "Chocolate" Perry – bass (1, 3, 4, 6, 7, 9, 12–14)
- Bob Glaub – bass (2)
- Leland Sklar – bass (5)
- Joe Vitale – drums (1, 3, 4, 7, 9, 13, 14)
- Russ Kunkel – drums (2, 5, 8)
- Jeff Porcaro – drums (6, 12)
- Joe Lala – percussion (2–4, 6, 7, 9, 13), congas (12)
- Wayne Goodwin – fiddle (2), cello arrangements (8)
- Roberleigh Barnhart – cello (8)
- Ernie Ehrhardt – cello (8)
- Miguel Martinez – cello (8)
- Timothy B. Schmit – additional vocals (1–4, 8, 14), bass (8)
- Art Garfunkel – additional vocals (11)

== Production ==
- Crosby, Stills & Nash – producers (1–4, 6–11)
- Steve Gursky – co-producer (1–4, 6–11), engineer
- Stanley Johnston – co-producer (1–4, 6–11), producer (10), engineer
- Craig Doerge – producer (5, 10)
- Stephen Barncard – additional engineer
- Gaylord Holomalia – second engineer
- Jerry Hudgins – second engineer
- Gerry Lentz – second engineer
- Jay Parti – second engineer
- Gordon Rowley – second engineer
- Russell Schmitt – second engineer
- Jeff Kallestad – second engineer
- Stan Richter – original mastering
- Joe Gastwirt – digital remastering
- Jimmy Wachtel – art direction
- Mac James – logo design
- Gilbert Williams – front cover painting
- Henry Diltz – back cover photography
- Mark Hanauer – front cover photography
- Eric Waltersheid – front cover photo assistant
- Bill Siddons – management
- Crosslight Management – management
- Jeff Wald & Associates – management

2006 Expanded Edition credits

- Gerry Tolman – executive producer
- James Austin – executive producer
- Stephen Stills – producer
- Graham Nash – producer
- Joel Bernstein – producer
- Stanley Johnston – producer, recording (12–15), mixing (12–14), mastering assistant, tape reviewing
- Steve Gursky – recording (12–14)
- Gerry Lentz – recording assistant (12–14)
- Jay Parti – recording assistant (15)
- Stephen Barncard – mixing (15)
- Greg Hayes – mix assistant (12–14), digital editing (12–14)
- Cory Frye – editorial supervision
- Bernie Grundman – mastering
- David Merchant – tape archivist
- John Nowland – tape transfers
- Greg Allen – art direction, design
- Kenny Nemes – product manager
- Ginger Dettman – project assistant
- Karen LeBlanc – project assistant
- Steve Woolard – project assistant

== Charts ==
Chart performance for Daylight Again
Chart (1982)	Peak position
US Top LPs & Tape (Billboard)	8
Canadian RPM 100 Albums	30
Norwegian VG-lista Albums	14
Australian Kent Music Report Chart	46
Dutch MegaCharts Albums	14
French Album Charts	18
West German Album Charts	31
Swedish Album Charts	18
US Cash Box Top 100 Albums	8

Year-end charts

Chart (1982)	Position
US Cashbox Year-End	37
Chart (1983)	Position
US Billboard Year-End	86

Sales chart performance for singles from Daylight Again
Year	Single	Chart	Position
1982	"Wasted on the Way"	US Billboard Hot 100	9
1982	"Wasted on the Way"	Netherlands (Single Top 100)	38
1982	"Wasted on the Way"	Canada Adult Contemporary (RPM)	3
1982	"Wasted on the Way"	US Adult Contemporary (Billboard)	2
1982	"Wasted on the Way"	Australia (Go-Set National Top 40)	96
1982	"Wasted on the Way"	US Modern Rock (Billboard)	9
1982	"Wasted on the Way"	US Hot Country Songs (Billboard)	87
1982	"Wasted on the Way"	US Top Singles (Cash Box)	8
1982	"Wasted on the Way"	France Singles Chart	53
1982	"Southern Cross"	US Billboard Hot 100	18
1982	"Southern Cross"	Canada Adult Contemporary (RPM)	1
1982	"Southern Cross"	US Top Singles (Cash Box)	18
1982	"Southern Cross"	US Modern Rock (Billboard)	39
1983	"Too Much Love To Hide"	US Billboard Hot 100	69
1983	"Too Much Love To Hide"	US Modern Rock (Billboard)	46
1983	"Too Much Love To Hide"	US Top Singles (Cash Box)	81

== Certifications ==
Region	Certification	Certified units/sales
United States (RIAA)	Platinum	1,000,000^{^}
^{^} Shipments figures based on certification alone.
