= The Southern Cross =

The Southern Cross may refer to:

== Newspappers ==
- The Southern Cross (Argentina), an Argentine newspaper by Patrick Joseph Dillon (1842-1889), a Roman Catholic priest, editor, and politician
- The Southern Cross (New Zealand), an Auckland newspaper (1843–1862) that changed its name to The Daily Southern Cross when it became a daily in 1862
- The Southern Cross (South Africa), the national Catholic weekly newspaper of South Africa
- The Southern Cross (San Diego), the official newspaper of the Roman Catholic Diocese of San Diego
- The Southern Cross (South Australia), the official newspaper of the Roman Catholic Diocese of Adelaide

== Film and television ==
- The Southern Cross (film), a 2003 Argentine film
- "The Southern Cross" (Daredevil: Born Again), a 2026 episode

== See also ==
- Southern Cross (disambiguation)
