= Southern Cross (Crosby, Stills and Nash song) =

1982 single by Crosby, Stills & Nash

Single by Crosby, Stills & Nash

from the album Daylight Again
- B-side: "Into the Darkness"
- Released: September 1982
- Recorded: 1981
- Genre: Folk rock; soft rock; yacht rock
- Length: 4:41 (Album Version); 3:55 (Single Version)
- Label: Atlantic
- Songwriters: Stephen Stills; Rick Curtis; Michael Curtis
- Producers: Crosby, Stills and Nash

Crosby, Stills & Nash singles chronology
"Wasted on the Way" (1982)	"Southern Cross" (1982)	"War Games" (1983)

Audio
- "Southern Cross" on YouTube

"Southern Cross" is a song written by Stephen Stills, Rick Curtis, and Michael Curtis and performed by the rock band Crosby, Stills & Nash. It was featured on the band's Daylight Again album and was released as a single in September 1982. With a theme concerning the healing power of sailing amongst the natural world, it was a hit for the group and has received classic rock airplay in the decades since, while also becoming a concert staple for Jimmy Buffett and his Coral Reefer Band.

Stephen Stills sings lead throughout "Southern Cross", with Graham Nash joining on the second verse. Because David Crosby did not reunite with Stills and Nash until the album was well underway, his vocals are not featured on the album version, although he did appear in the video and subsequently sang the song with the group in live performances. The single was a success on the charts, reaching No. 18 on the Billboard Hot 100 for three weeks in late November and early December 1982. It was the group's final hit in the Billboard Top 40.

== Composition and music ==
"Southern Cross" is based on the song "Seven League Boots" by Rick and Michael Curtis. Stills explained, "The Curtis Brothers brought a wonderful song called 'Seven League Boots', but it drifted around too much. I rewrote a new set of words and added a different chorus, a story about a long boat trip I took after my divorce. It's about using the power of the universe to heal your wounds. Once again, I was given somebody's gem and cut and polished it."

The song title and lyrics reference the Crux constellation, known as the Southern Cross. Geographic locations referenced include Papeete, the Marquesas, and Avalon.

With lyrics that explore the subject of cruise sailing and an adult contemporary musical aesthetic, "Southern Cross" is both literally and stylistically yacht rock. Billboard called the song a "midtempo minor-keyed saga very much in the tradition of [Stills'] earlier CSN and solo compositions." The term "minor-keyed" presumably related to the song's bittersweet lyrics, as the song itself is performed in a major key.

A radio edit of the song omits the final verse.

== Music video ==
The video for the song, which got heavy play during the early years of the MTV and VH1 cable networks, featured Stephen Stills sailing a large boat (called Southern Cross), intercut with images of the band singing, including David Crosby although he did not sing on the song (see above). The video uses the radio edit of the song.

== Personnel ==
- Stephen Stills – vocals, guitars
- Graham Nash – vocals

=== Additional musicians ===
- Timothy B. Schmit – vocals
- Michael Stergis – guitars
- Mike Finnigan – keyboards, backing vocals
- Richard T. Bear – keyboards
- George "Chocolate" Perry – bass
- Joe Vitale – drums
- Joe Lala – percussion

== Locations ==
The song mentions a number of locations that one may visit on a sailing voyage from Southern California to the South Pacific, following the "Coconut Milk Run". In order of appearance in the song (and in reverse order of the narrating sailor's southwestward journey), they are:

- Southern islands - referring to Polynesia
- Papeete - the capital of French Polynesia on the island of Tahiti
- Marquesas - a group of volcanic islands in French Polynesia, northeast of Tahiti
- Avalon - a harbor town on Santa Catalina Island, just off the coast of Los Angeles, California.

== See also ==
- Sailors' superstitions
- Southern Cross (folk song)
- Southern Cross (disambiguation)
