= Plantation Harbor =

Studio album by Joe Vitale
- Released: 1981
- Recorded: 1979–1980
- Studio: Various: Bayshore Recording (Coconut Grove, Florida); Rudy Records (Los Angeles, California); Santa Barbara Sound (Santa Barbara, California); The Vinylrosa (Little Switzerland, North Carolina); Home-Brew Studio (The Third Ring of Venus)
- Genre: Rock; pop rock; soft rock; reggae fusion
- Length: 39:37
- Label: Asylum
- Producer: Bill Szymczyk for Pandora Productions, Ltd

Joe Vitale chronology
Roller Coaster Weekend (1974)	Plantation Harbor (1981)	Speaking in Drums (2008)

Singles from Plantation Harbor
- 1. "Lady on the Rock" Released: 1981; 2. "Never Gonna to Leave You Alone (Crazy 'Bout You Baby)" Released: 1981

Plantation Harbor is the second solo studio album by American rock musician Joe Vitale, released in 1981 by Asylum Records. The album was his only album to chart, peaking at No. 181 on the U.S. Billboard 200.

The album was released at the height of the popularity of the new wave music movement. The song "Lady on the Rock" received some airplay in the US on album-oriented rock radio, but the album was generally poorly received.

The album features guest performances by Joe Walsh, Don Felder, Timothy B. Schmit, Stephen Stills, Graham Nash, Mickey Thomas, Paul Harris, George "Chocolate" Perry, Joe Lala, and Marilyn Martin, and horns arranged by James Pankow.

== Background ==
In 1981, Bill Szymczyk had produced the Who's Face Dances, and Vitale had made commitments to Who bassist John Entwistle's fifth solo studio album Too Late the Hero with Joe Walsh.

The instrumental "Theme from Cabin Weirdos" is another in the series of "Weirdo" instrumentals (such as "Theme from Boat Weirdos," "Theme from Island Weirdos," etc.) that Joe Walsh and Vitale had on previous albums.

The Echo drums on the track "Theme from Cabin Weirdos" were recorded on top of Mount Mitchell, the highest peak of the Appalachian Mountains and the highest peak in the eastern United States; the mountain reaches an elevation of 6,684 ft (2,037 m).

== Critical reception ==
Professional ratings
Review scores
Source	Rating
AllMusic	2/5 stars

In a retrospective review for AllMusic, critic Rob Caldwell called the album "a dated sounding, but decent, collection of light and airy late 1970s/early 1980s rock." He likened it to Joe Walsh's solo albums, but disclaimed that it does not have the "strong hooks or the bite."

== Track listing ==
All songs written by Joe Vitale, except where noted.

Side one

1. "Plantation Harbor" – 4:14
2. "Never Gonna Leave You Alone (Crazy 'Bout You Baby)" – 5:04
3. "Laugh-Laugh" – 4:29
4. "Man Gonna Love You" – 5:01

Side two

5. "Theme from Cabin Weirdos" – 2:48
6. "Lady on the Rock" (Vitale, Bill Szymczyk, Stephen Stills) – 5:30
7. "Bamboo Jungle" – 3:16
8. "Sailor Man" – 3:58
9. "I'm Flyin'" – 5:17

== Personnel ==
Credits are adapted from the album's liner notes.

Musicians

- Joe Vitale – vocals (1–4, 6–9), drums, percussion, synthesizers (1, 2, 6–9) organ (1, 2), clavinet (1–3, 4, 7–9), vibraphone (3), flute (3, 7), electric piano (4, 5), grand piano (5)
- Paul Harris – acoustic piano (2, 3, 8), clavinet (6), horn arrangements (8)
- Bob Mayo – lead clavinet (7), acoustic piano (9)
- Graham Nash – acoustic piano (9), backing vocals (9)
- Willie Hale – rhythm guitar (1)
- Joe Walsh – lead guitar (1, 6, 8), guitars (2, 3, 7, 9), rhythm guitar (6)
- Don Felder – guitars (4), rhythm guitar (6, 8), guitar solo (8)
- George "Chocolate" Perry – bass guitar (1–4, 6–9), backing vocals (1, 2, 7)
- Joe Lala – congas (3)
- Marty Grebb – alto saxophone (8), sax solo (8)
- Walter Parazaider – tenor saxophone (8)
- James Pankow – trombone (8), horn arrangements (8)
- Lee Loughnane – trumpet (8)
- Jimmie Haskell – string arrangements
- Sid Sharp – concertmaster
- Joan Perry – backing vocals (1, 2)
- Marilyn Martin – backing vocals (1, 4, 6)
- Ricky Washington – backing vocals (1, 2)
- Mickey Thomas – backing vocals (2)
- Timothy B. Schmit – backing vocals (3, 8, 9), acoustic piano (9)
- Greg Droman – backing vocals (4)
- Stephen Stills – backing vocals (9)

Production

- Bill Szymczyk – producer, engineer, inner sleeve photography, album cover concept
- Allan Blazek – assistant engineer
- James Geddes – assistant engineer
- Ed Mashal – assistant engineer
- Jay PartI – assistant engineer
- Jimmy Patterson – assistant engineer
- John Swain – assistant engineer
- Buddy Thornton – assistant engineer, maintenance engineer, truck driver, C.B. Maintenance, Mobile Monsters, fish dinners, Space Invaders maintenance, console customizing, one pound-o-lony, inner sleeve photography
- Ted Jensen – mastering at Sterling Sound (New York City, New York)
- Jimmy Wachtel – art direction, design
- Joe Vitale – album cover concept, inner sleeve photography
- Scherley Busch – cover photography
- Jage Jackson – inner sleeve photography

Notes Stephen Stills, Jimmy Pankow, Lee Loughnane, Walt Parazaider and Marty Grebb appear courtesy of Columbia Records

== Chart performance ==
Album – Billboard (North America)

Year	Chart	Position
1981	Billboard 200	181

Singles – Billboard (North America)

Year	Single	Chart	Position
1981	"Lady on the Rock"	Mainstream Rock Tracks	47
