= Roller Coaster Weekend =

Studio album by Joe Vitale
- Released: 1974
- Studio: Criteria Recording Studios (Miami, Florida)
- Genre: Rock; pop rock; soft rock
- Length: 37:40
- Label: Atlantic – SD 18114
- Producer: Howard Albert; Ron Albert; Joe Vitale

Joe Vitale chronology
Roller Coaster Weekend (1974)	Plantation Harbor (1981)

Singles from Roller Coaster Weekend
- 1. "Take a Chance on Love" Released: October 7, 1974; 2. "Shoot 'em Up" Released: March 1975

Professional ratings
Review scores
Source	Rating
AllMusic	2/5 stars

Roller Coaster Weekend is the debut solo studio album by American rock musician Joe Vitale, released in 1974 by Atlantic Records. The album wasn't a commercial success and was his last solo album until 1981's Plantation Harbor (released seven years later). After the recording of Roller Coaster Weekend, Vitale would join the Stills-Young band and tour with Crosby, Stills, Nash & Young line-up, as well as the Eagles.

The song "Falling," was borrowed in part for Joe Walsh's song "At the Station", later recorded and released on Walsh's fourth solo album But Seriously, Folks... (1978)

== Critical reception ==
In a retrospective review by AllMusic critic Rob Caldwell gave the album a star rating of 2 out of 5 (meaning "Poor") and he stated that considering the stalwart guitarists featured on the album it's a "song-oriented album" and he also added that the album "never quite gets off the ground."

== Track listing ==
All tracks are written by Joe Vitale

No.	Title	Length
1.	"Roller Coaster Weekend"	2:58
2.	"(Do You Feel Like) Movin'"	3:38
3.	"Mad Man"	4:23
4.	"Take a Chance On Love"	3:07
5.	"School Yard"	4:47

Side two
No.	Title	Length
6.	"Shoot 'em Up"	3:29
7.	"Feeling's Gone Away"	3:31
8.	"Two of Us"	3:29
9.	"Falling"	4:02
10.	"Interlude"	1:03
11.	"Step On You"	3:14
Total length:		37:40

== Personnel ==
Credits are adapted from the album's liner notes.

Musicians

- Joe Vitale – lead and background vocals; drums; bass guitar; keyboards; piano; synthesizers; vibraphone; flute; finger cymbals; gong; timpani; additional percussion
- Joe Walsh – guitar
- Phil Keaggy – guitar
- Rick Derringer – guitar
- Nelson "Flaco" Padron – congas; additional percussion
- "Howie" (Howard Albert) – handclaps
- "Ronnie" (Ron Albert) – handclaps

Production

- Howard Albert – Record producer; engineer
- Ron Albert – producer; engineer
- Joe Vitale – producer
- Alex Sadkin – audio mastering
- Arman Kachaturian – design; art direction
