= Thunder Island (song) =

Single by Jay Ferguson

from the album Thunder Island
- B-side: "Magic Moment"
- Released: October 1977
- Genre: Soft rock
- Length: 4:00 (album version); 3:19 (single version)
- Label: Asylum
- Songwriter: Jay Ferguson
- Producer: Bill Szymczyk

Jay Ferguson singles chronology
| "Medicated Goo" (1976) | "Thunder Island" (1977) | "Losing Control" (1978) |

"Thunder Island" is a song by American musician Jay Ferguson. It is the title track and lead single from the 1977 album of the same name. The song peaked at No. 9 on the US Billboard Hot 100 the week of April 1, 1978. The recording features Joe Walsh on guitar. In Canada, it reached No. 8.

As "Thunder Island" was Ferguson's highest-ranking song on the charts, he is sometimes tagged a one-hit wonder. However, he achieved an additional hit with the song "Shakedown Cruise" which reached No. 31 on the Hot 100 the week of June 23, 1979. Ferguson had also scored hits with his two previous bands: "I Got a Line on You" by Spirit and "Run Run Run" by Jo Jo Gunne reached the top 40 in 1968 and 1972, respectively.

== Chart performance ==
| Chart (1977–1978) | Peak position |
|---|---|
| Canada RPM Top Singles | 8 |
| US Billboard Hot 100 | 9 |
