= Got It Made =

Single by Crosby, Stills, Nash & Young

from the album American Dream
- A-side: "This Old House"
- Released: 1988
- Recorded: July 28, 1988
- Studio: Redwood Digital, Woodside, California
- Length: 4:56
- Label: Atlantic
- Songwriters: Stephen Stills; Neil Young
- Producers: Niko Bolas; Crosby, Stills, Nash & Young

Crosby, Stills, Nash & Young singles chronology
"American Dream" (1988)	"Got It Made" (1988)	"Chippin' Away" (1990)

"Got It Made" is a song by Crosby, Stills, Nash & Young, featured on their 1988 album American Dream. It was released as a double A-side single alongside "This Old House" and became the only song from the album to chart on the Billboard Hot 100, peaking at number 69 in February of 1989. The song is performed by Stephen Stills and was written by Stills and Neil Young.

== Reception ==
Despite the mediocre reception for its parent album, "Got It Made" received positive reviews. Cashbox labeled it as a "pleasant ditty that grows on you" with "vocal chemistry" that contributes to "a smooth sonic underpaying for the tune to ride on." Anthony DeCurtis of Rolling Stone called it a "jaunty" song that succeeded on its "own modest terms". Paste placed the song at No. 9 in their list of the band's 13 best, calling its chorus "instantly catchy" and referring to the song as a standout on the album.

== Track listing ==
1. "This Old House" (Neil Young) – 4:48
2. "Got It Made" (Stephen Stills, Young) – 4:36

== Personnel ==
- Stephen Stills – lead vocals, keyboards
- Neil Young – electric guitar
- Bob Glaub – bass
- Joe Vitale – drums
- Joe Lala – percussion

== Charts ==
=== Weekly charts ===
Chart (1989)	Peak position
Canadian Top Singles (RPM)	16
US Billboard Hot 100	69
US Billboard Adult Contemporary	11
US Billboard Album Rock Tracks	1
