= Thunder Island (album) =

Studio album by Jay Ferguson
- Released: 1977
- Studio: Criteria Studios (Miami)
- Genre: Rock, soft rock
- Length: 37:43
- Label: Asylum
- Producer: Bill Szymczyk, Ed Mashal

Jay Ferguson chronology
All Alone in the End Zone (1976)	Thunder Island (1977)	Real Life Ain't This Way (1979)

Professional ratings
Review scores
Source	Rating
AllMusic	4/5 stars

Thunder Island is the second studio album by American musician Jay Ferguson. The title track became a top ten hit on the Billboard Hot 100 chart.

The album was first issued on compact disc by the Collector's Choice label. The album was reissued as part of a two disc set including Ferguson's first and third solo albums by Edsel. The booklet included a new interview with Ferguson discussing the making of his first three albums.

Producer Bill Szymczyk recruited much of the same personnel as Ferguson's first solo album including Joe Walsh to play on the album which was recorded in the same Miami studio as the Eagles' Hotel California and other big albums of the era.

== Track listing ==
All tracks written by Jay Ferguson, except where noted.

No.	Title	Writer(s)	Length
1.	"Thunder Island"		4:00
2.	"Soulin'"		4:07
3.	"Happy Birthday, Baby"		4:15
4.	"Losing Control"		3:50
5.	"Cozumel"	Joey Murcia	3:14
6.	"Night Shift"		3:36
7.	"Babylon"		4:23
8.	"Love Is Cold"		3:48
9.	"Happy Too!"	Stan Kipper	2:31
10.	"Magic Moment"	Ferguson, Bill Szymczyk	3:59
Total length:			37:43

== Personnel ==
- Jay Ferguson - lead and harmony vocals, keyboards; handclaps on "Losing Control", Arp bass on "Babylon"
- Joey Murcia - guitars, harmony vocals; lead guitar on "Cozumel" and "Happy Too!"
- Tony Battaglia - guitars, harmony vocals; lead guitar on "Babylon" and "Love is Cold", slide guitar on "Magic Moment"
- Harold Cowart - bass on all tracks except "Love is Cold"
- Stan Kipper - drums, harmony vocals; cuica on "Happy Too!"

=== Guest musicians ===
- Joe Walsh - slide guitar on "Thunder Island", lead guitar on "Happy Birthday, Baby", "Losing Control" and "Night Shift", guitar on "Babylon"
- Bob Webb - guitar on "Babylon" and "Love is Cold"
- Ed Brown - bass on "Love is Cold"
- Bill Szymczyk - percussion; handclaps on "Losing Control"
- Ed Marsal — handclaps on "Losing Control"

== Production ==
- Bill Szymczyk - producer, engineer
- Ed Mashal - assistant producer, engineer
- Lee Hulko - mastering
