= The Chylds =

American rock band

- Origin: Canton, OH
- Genres: Rock; pop
- Years active: 1964-68
- Label: Warner
- Past members: Joe Vitale; Al Twiss; John Berecek; Tim Hogan

The Chylds were a popular northern Ohio rock band from 1964 to 1968.

== History ==
The band started life as The Echoes, but after they signed with Warner, their manager Nick Boldi wanted them to change the name to "The Wild Childs." This didn't suit the band members, so they settled on The Chylds, thinking this would sound British and pick up some of the popularity surrounding such bands as the Beatles. Band members included John Berecek on lead guitar and vocals, Al Twiss on bass guitar and vocals, Tim Hogan on rhythm guitar, keyboards and vocals and Joe Vitale, on drums and vocals. Vitale started his professional music career with The Chylds in 1965 at age 17, and sang vocals on their hit single "I Want More (Lovin’)."

The band recorded a number of 45 singles at Akron Recording Studios in Akron, Ohio, at Cleveland Recording and at Gateway in Pittsburgh.The Chylds opened for bands including The Beach Boys and Mitch Ryder, and appeared on the TV show Upbeat. Their single, "Psychedelic Soul," charted nationally in Billboard. The band broke up in 1968 because some of the band members got married and needed to find jobs to support a family. Only Joe Vitale went on to make a career as a musician.

Their recording of "Hay Girl" was released in 1984 on the compilation LP Highs in the Mid-Sixties, Volume 9 by AIP Records (as #AIP-10015).

== Discography ==
The Echoes:

- "Around and Around" / "You Make Me Feel Good" (Dupree 101)

The Chylds:

- "Hay Girl" / "I Want More (Lovin')" (Giant 101)
- "Hay Girl" / "I Want More (Lovin')" (Warner Brothers 7058)
- "Deep Inside" / "Psychedelic Soul" (Warner Brothers 7095)
- "Grey Days" / "No More Tears" (Ivanhoe 1801)
