= American Dream (Crosby, Stills, Nash & Young album) =

Studio album by Crosby, Stills, Nash and Young
- Released: November 1, 1988
- Recorded: April 24, 1987–September 16, 1988
- Studios: Redwood Digital (Woodside, California); A&M (Hollywood, California); Record One (Los Angeles, California)
- Genre: Rock
- Length: 57:31
- Label: Atlantic
- Producers: Niko Bolas; David Crosby; Stephen Stills; Graham Nash; Neil Young

Crosby, Stills, Nash and Young chronology
Allies (1983)	American Dream (1988)	Live It Up (1990)

Singles from American Dream
- 1. "American Dream" Released: October 1988; 2. "Got It Made" / "This Old House" Released: January 1989

American Dream is the fifth studio album by Crosby, Stills & Nash, and their second with Neil Young. Released in 1988 on Atlantic Records, it peaked at No. 16 on the Billboard 200 and has been certified platinum by the Recording Industry Association of America. To date, it is their final album of original material to receive either a gold or platinum citation by the RIAA. It is the highest-selling album by Neil Young in the 1980s. The album is dedicated to Jan Crosby, Anne Stills, Susan Nash and Pegi Young.

== Background ==
Neil Young promised David Crosby in 1983 that he would reunite with Crosby, Stills & Nash if Crosby could solve his problems with drugs and clean himself up. Five months in prison in 1986 for Crosby at the Texas Department of Corrections in Huntsville following his 1985 arrest for possession of illegal drugs and a semi-automatic firearm in West Palm Beach, Florida accomplished exactly that, and, good to Young's word, the quartet assembled to record the second official CSNY studio album at Young's ranch in Woodside, California with his handpicked production team.

The title song, written by Neil Young, is a satire of then-sensational political scandals involving Oliver North, former presidential candidate Gary Hart and televangelist Jimmy Swaggart, and was promoted with a filmed music video directed by Julien Temple that featured members of the band portraying exaggerated caricatures of North (Stills), Hart (Nash), and Swaggart (Crosby) with a disguised Young acting as narrator to their "downfall" and a Punk Rocker. Released as a single, it missed the Billboard Hot 100 completely, as did three of the other four singles released from the album but managed to peak at No. 4 on Album Rock Tracks Chart (now Mainstream Rock). The only single to chart in the US, "Got It Made", peaked at No. 69 on the Hot 100, though it charted much higher on two format-specific Billboard charts— #11 on Adult Contemporary and #1 on Album Rock Tracks. In Young's native Canada, the single "American Dream" was a substantial hit, peaking at #3, while "Got It Made" peaked at #16.

== Recording ==
David Crosby recounted, "The whole thing, the recording of American Dream, it got stretched out. And we did not have, really, the best group of songs to work with. Then, even though we did not have enough good songs, we ended up putting fourteen of them on the album! I think that was stupid." For the first time in the group's history, none of the songs from a studio album became standard items in the group's live repertoire.

== Reception ==
Professional ratings
Review scores
Source	Rating
Allmusic	2/5 stars
Robert Christgau	C+
Rolling Stone	2/5 stars

Writing in Rolling Stone, critic Anthony DeCurtis wrote that "Despite pleasant melodies, the occasional interesting song, and the signature harmonies, American Dream is, for the most part, a snoozefest."

The album was voted number 614 in the second edition of Colin Larkin's All Time Top 1000 Albums (1998).

== Track listing ==
American Dream track listing
No.	Title	Writer(s)	Recording date	Length
1.	"American Dream"	Neil Young	March 3, 1988	3:15
2.	"Got It Made"	Stephen Stills; Young	July 28, 1988	4:36
3.	"Name of Love"	Young	February 25, 1988	4:28
4.	"Don't Say Goodbye"	Graham Nash; Joe Vitale	September 15, 1988	3:23
5.	"This Old House"	Young	May 4, 1988	4:44
6.	"Nighttime for the Generals"	David Crosby; Craig Doerge	March 24, 1988	4:20
7.	"Shadowland"	Nash; Rick Ryan; Vitale	April 24, 1987	4:33
8.	"Drivin' Thunder"	Stills; Young	March 2, 1988	3:12
9.	"Clear Blue Skies"	Nash	March 28, 1988	3:05
10.	"That Girl"	Stills; Vitale; Bob Glaub	May 10, 1988	3:27
11.	"Compass"	Crosby	March 22, 1988	5:19
12.	"Soldiers of Peace"	Nash; Doerge; Vitale	September 16, 1988	3:43
13.	"Feel Your Love"	Young	July 21, 1988	4:09
14.	"Night Song"	Stills; Young	July 28, 1988	4:17
Total length:				57:31

== Personnel ==
=== CSNY ===
- David Crosby – backing vocals, lead vocals (6, 11), acoustic guitar (9, 11)
- Stephen Stills – backing vocals, keyboards (1, 2), lead vocals (2, 8, 10, 14), electric guitar (3, 4, 6, 8–10, 14), synth bass (4), guitar solo (6), percussion (8), acoustic guitar (12), synthesizers (14), bass (14), handclaps (14)
- Graham Nash – backing vocals, lead vocals (4, 7, 9, 12), acoustic piano (4), electric guitar (6), keyboards (9)
- Neil Young – backing vocals, lead vocals (1, 3, 5, 8, 13, 14), electric guitar (1–10, 12, 14), percussion (3, 13), additional acoustic piano (4), all instruments (5), harmonica (11), acoustic guitar (13)

=== Additional personnel ===
- Bryan Bell – synthesizer programming (5)
- Mike Finnigan – Hammond B3 organ (6), keyboards (12), additional vocals (12)
- Rhett Lawrence – synthesizer programming (12)
- Bob Glaub – bass (1–3, 6, 8–10, 12)
- Joe Vitale – drums (1–4, 6, 8, 9, 14), synthesizers (4), all instruments (7), additional vocals (7), percussion (8, 13), keyboards (9–12), vibraphone (13)
- Chad Cromwell – drums (10)
- Joe Lala – percussion (2, 7, 9, 10), drums (12)
- The Bluenotes – horns (10):
- Larry Cragg – saxophones
- Steve Lawrence – saxophones
- Claude Callilet – trombone
- Tommy Bray – trumpet
- John Fumo – trumpet

Handclaps on "American Dream"

- Niko Bolas, Tim Mulligan, Tim Foster and Brentley Walton

Sound effects on "Shadowland"

- Bill Boydston, Don Gooch, Bill Lazerus, Graham Nash and Joe Vitale

The Volume Dealers Choir on "Soldiers of Peace"

- Kelly Ashmore, Betsy Aubrey, Tom Banghart, Cha Blevins, Niko Bolas, Craig Doerge, Scott Gordon, R. Mac Holbert, Stanley Johnston, Bill Krause, Debbie Meister, Tim Mulligan, Susan Nash, Jay Parti, Steve Perry, Vince Slaughter, Joe Vitale and Paul Williamson

=== Production ===
- Crosby, Stills, Nash & Young – producers, mixing
- Niko Bolas – producer, recording, mixing
- Tim Mulligan – assistant producer, recording, mixing, digital editing
- Gary Long – engineer
- Tim McColm – engineer
- Brentley Walton – engineer
- Tom Banghart – mix assistant
- Bob Vogt – mix assistant
- Bill Dooley – digital editing
- Bob Ludwig – mastering at Masterdisk (New York City, New York)
- Gary Burden – art direction, design
- Henry Diltz – back cover photography
- Aaron Rapoport – front cover photography
- Delana Bettoli – border illustration

== Charts ==
Chart performance for American Dream
Chart (1988–89)	Peak position
US Top LPs & Tape (Billboard)	16
Canadian RPM 100 Albums	5
Australian Kent Music Report Chart	47
Dutch MegaCharts Albums	58
West German Album Charts	48
Swedish Album Charts	26
US Cash Box Top 100 Albums	15

Sales chart performance for singles from American Dream
Year	Single	Chart	Position
1988	"American Dream"	Canada Singles (RPM)	3
1988	"American Dream"	US Mainstream Rock (Billboard)	4
1988	"American Dream"	UK Singles Chart	55
1988	"Night Time for Generals"	US Mainstream Rock (Billboard)	39
1989	"Got It Made"	US Billboard Hot 100	69
1989	"Got It Made"	Canada Singles (RPM)	16
1989	"Got It Made"	US Top Singles (Cash Box)	58
1989	"Got It Made"	US Mainstream Rock (Billboard)	1
1989	"Got It Made"	US Adult Contemporary (Billboard)	11
1989	"This Old House"	US Hot Country Songs (Billboard)	92
1989	"That Girl"	US Mainstream Rock (Billboard)	25

Year-end charts

Chart (1989)	Position
US Billboard Year-End	76

== Certifications ==
Region	Certification	Certified units/sales
United States (RIAA)	Platinum	1,000,000^{^}
^{^} Shipments figures based on certification alone.

== In popular culture ==
An early version of the track "Night Song" (with alternate vocals) was a major plot point in the 1986 Twilight Zone episode "Nightsong".
