= Allies (Crosby, Stills & Nash album) =

Live album by Crosby, Stills, & Nash
- Released: June 6, 1983
- Recorded: 1977–1983
- Venues: New Universal Amphitheater, Universal City, California; The Summit, Houston; Studio tracks in Los Angeles
- Genre: Rock
- Length: 42:32
- Label: Atlantic
- Producers: Graham Nash, Stephen Stills, Stanley Johnston, Ron Albert, and Howard Albert

Crosby, Stills, & Nash chronology
Daylight Again (1982)	Allies (1983)	American Dream (1988)

Singles from Allies
- 1. "War Games/Shadow Captain" Released: 1983; 2. "Raise a Voice/For What It's Worth" Released: 1983

Professional ratings
Review scores
Source	Rating
AllMusic	2/5 stars

Allies is a live album by Crosby, Stills & Nash, released on Atlantic Records in 1983. A live concert clip for "Wasted on the Way" received some rotation on MTV at the time, as did the single "War Games". It peaked at No. 43 on the Billboard 200.

== Content ==
The album starts off with two studio recordings. The lead track "War Games" was written for the 1983 film WarGames and was released as a single by the group, which peaked at No. 45 on the Billboard Hot 100. This song was used in initial early promotional theatrical trailers and in a promotional video for MTV, but their participation in the project was cancelled at the last moment. The MTV video for the song was composed solely of scenes from the movie. The second studio track, "Raise a Voice" by Stephen Stills and Graham Nash, was appended to the 2006 re-issue of Daylight Again as a bonus track.

The rest of the album consists of live recordings from two different tours. The tracks "Shadow Captain" and "He Played Real Good for Free" were recorded in Houston, Texas, on the 1977 tour for the CSN album. Presumably they were chosen as they were strong David Crosby performances, something becoming more difficult for Crosby to muster evidenced by his minimal participation on the band's previous studio album as he dealt with personal difficulties that would eventually lead to his time in prison. The rest of the album derives from a show at the new Universal Amphitheatre in Universal City, California, on the 1982 tour to promote Daylight Again.

David Crosby would spend time in prison in Texas during 1986, putting the group on temporary hiatus. As a result, there would not be another Crosby, Stills & Nash album until 1988 and their reunion with Neil Young, that five-year gap the longest between releases by the group to that point in time.

== Track listing ==
Side one
No.	Title	Writer(s)	Length
1.	"War Games" (studio track)	Stephen Stills	2:18
2.	"Raise a Voice" (studio track)	Graham Nash, Stills	2:31
3.	"Turn Your Back on Love"	Stills, Nash, Michael Stergis	5:04
4.	"Barrel of Pain"	Nash	5:46
5.	"Shadow Captain"	David Crosby, Craig Doerge	4:30

Side two
No.	Title	Writer(s)	Length
1.	"Dark Star"	Stills	4:48
2.	"Blackbird"	John Lennon, Paul McCartney	2:30
3.	"He Played Real Good for Free"	Joni Mitchell	3:48
4.	"Wasted on the Way"	Nash	3:04
5.	"For What It's Worth"	Stills	5:38

== Personnel ==
- David Crosby – vocals, guitars
- Stephen Stills – vocals, guitars, keyboards
- Graham Nash – vocals, guitars, keyboards

=== Additional musicians ===
- Danny Kortchmar – electric guitar on "War Games" and "Raise a Voice"
- Michael Stergis – electric guitar on "Raise a Voice"
- James Newton Howard – keyboards on "War Games", "Turn Your Back on Love", "Barrel of Pain", "Dark Star" and "For What It's Worth"
- Mike Finnigan – additional vocals on "Barrel of Pain," keyboards on "Turn Your Back on Love", "Barrel of Pain", "Dark Star" and "For What It's Worth"
- Craig Doerge – keyboards on "War Games", "Raise a Voice" and "Shadow Captain"
- George "Chocolate" Perry – bass
- Joe Vitale – drums all tracks except "War Games" and "Raise a Voice"
- Jeff Porcaro – drums on "War Games" and "Raise a Voice"
- Efrain Toro – percussion on "Turn Your Back on Love", "Barrel of Pain", "Dark Star" and "For What It's Worth"
- Joe Lala – percussion on "Shadow Captain"

=== Production ===
- Stephen Stills, Graham Nash, Stanley Johnston – producers
- Ron Albert, Howard Albert – co-producers on "Shadow Captain" and "He Played Real Good for Free"
- Steve Gursky, David Hewitt, Stanley Johnston, Jay Parti— engineers
- Jeff Kallestad, Gerry Lentz, and Doug Williams — assistant engineers

== Charts ==
Chart performance for Allies
Chart (1982)	Peak position
US Top LPs & Tape (Billboard)	43
Canadian RPM 100 Albums	92
Dutch MegaCharts Albums	39
West German Album Charts	44
US Cash Box Top 100 Albums	59

Chart performance for singles from Allies
Year	Single	Chart	Position
1983	"War Games"	US Billboard Hot 100	45
1983	"War Games"	Canada Adult Contemporary (RPM)	41
1983	"War Games"	US Modern Rock (Billboard)	13
1983	"War Games"	US Top Singles (Cash Box)	53
