= Shakedown Cruise =

Single by Jay Ferguson

from the album Real Life Ain't This Way
- B-side: "City of Angels"
- Released: May 1979
- Genre: Pop rock
- Label: Asylum Records
- Songwriter: Jay Ferguson
- Producers: Jay Ferguson, Ed Mashal

Jay Ferguson singles chronology
"Losing Control" (1978)	"Shakedown Cruise" (1979)	"Paying Time" (1979)

"Shakedown Cruise" is a song written and recorded by Jay Ferguson, from his album Real Life Ain't This Way.

== Track listing ==
U.S. 7" single
A. "Shakedown Cruise" - 3:10
B. "City of Angels" - 3:44

== Chart performance ==
Released as a single in 1979, the song reached No. 31 on the U.S. Billboard Hot 100 and No. 27 on Cash Box. It was his second and final song to hit the Billboard charts after "Thunder Island" peaked at No. 9. In Canada, "Shakedown Cruise" peaked at No. 48.
