= Southern Cross News =

A number of news broadcasts were referred to as Southern Cross News, including:

- Southern Cross News (now Seven News Tasmania), regional news on Seven Tasmania (formerly Southern Cross Tasmania), broadcast from Launceston, Tasmania.
- Southern Cross News (changed to Nightly News 7 Spencer Gulf), a former regional news bulletin on Seven GTS/BKN (formerly Southern Cross GTS/BKN), broadcast to Spencer Gulf, South Australia & Broken Hill, New South Wales from Southern Cross Austereo studios in Hobart.
- Southern Cross News (now Seven News updates on Seven stations and now 10 News updates on 10 stations), radio and television news updates by Seven West Media and Network 10, broadcast from Launceston & Hobart, Tasmania, Australia

== See also ==
- Southern Cross (disambiguation)
