= Speaking in Drums =

Studio album by Joe Vitale
- Released: December 19, 2008
- Genre: Rock
- Length: 49:00
- Label: Hit

Joe Vitale chronology
Plantation Harbor (1981)	Speaking in Drums (2008)

Speaking in Drums is the third solo studio album by American rock musician Joe Vitale. The album is a collection of eleven songs written and performed by Joe Vitale, his wife Susie Vitale, and his son Joe Vitale Jr. among other guests.

The album's sound was inspired by music from his favorite legendary artists such as the Beach Boys, the Who, Phil Collins, Led Zeppelin, and the Beatles.

== Track listing ==
All tracks are written by Joe Vitale.

No.	Title	Length
1.	"Love's Such a Mystery"	4:27
2.	"I Play the Drums"	4:33
3.	"You Are My Sunshine"	4:16
4.	"Somethin' Bout My Baby"	4:53
5.	"Roots of Rock 'N Roll"	4:28
6.	"Oh Oh Susie"	4:18
7.	"The Beat of My Heart"	4:53
8.	"She's the One"	3:44
9.	"I'm So Lonely Tonight"	4:28
10.	"Get the Shovel & Dig the Hole"	3:54
11.	"Speaking in Drums"	5:06
Total length:		49:00
