= SS Southern Cross =

SS Southern Cross may refer to:

- SS Southern Cross (1886), a sealing vessel
- SS Southern Cross (1921), an ocean liner belonging to the Munson Line; later USS Wharton (AP-7) during World War II
- SS Southern Cross (1946), a heavy lift ship
- SS Southern Cross (1955), an ocean liner

== See also ==
- Southern Cross (disambiguation)
