= Southern Cross (disambiguation) =

The Southern Cross or Crux is a star group visible mainly in the Southern Hemisphere. It has been known by this English term since the late 18th century.

Southern Cross may also refer to:

== Arts, entertainment and media ==
=== Music ===
- "Southern Cross" (folk song), a Newfoundland folk ballad
- "Southern Cross" (Crosby, Stills and Nash song) (1982)
- "Southern Cross", a 1993 song by 808 State from Gorgeous
- "Southern Cross", a 1975 song by the Ozark Mountain Daredevils from The Car Over the Lake Album
- "Visions (Southern Cross)", a song by Stratovarius from Visions
- "Southern Cross", a song by Jason Webley from Counterpoint
- "The Sign of the Southern Cross", a song by Black Sabbath from Mob Rules

=== Newspapers ===
- The Southern Cross (Argentina), an Argentine newspaper
- The Southern Cross (South Africa), a South African national Catholic weekly newspaper
- The Southern Cross (South Australia), a Catholic newspaper

=== Television ===
- Seven Regional, formerly Southern Cross Television, an Australian television network
- 10 Regional, formerly Southern Cross Ten, an Australian television channel
- "Southern Cross", an episode of Robotech
- "The Southern Cross", an episode of Daredevil: Born Again

=== Other uses in arts, entertainment and media ===
- Southern Cross (Cornwell novel), 1998, by Patricia Cornwell
- Southern Cross (wordless novel), a 1951 wordless novel by Laurence Hyde
- Gryphus 1 or the Southern Cross, a character in Ace Combat X: Skies of Deception
- The Southern Cross, a fictional organization in Inferno Cop

== Businesses ==
- Southern Cross Broadcasting, a broadcasting company in Australia
- Southern Cross Austereo, an Australian media company
- Southern Cross Healthcare (United Kingdom), a former operator of rest and care homes
- Southern Cross Healthcare Group (New Zealand), a health insurance and hospital operator
- Southern Cross Telco, a telecommunications company in Australia

== Education ==
- Southern Cross Campus, a composite school in Auckland, New Zealand
- Southern Cross College, a former name of Alphacrucis, a Christian college in Chester Hill, New South Wales, Australia
- Southern Cross University, in Lismore, New South Wales, Australia
- Southern Cross School, a K-12 school in Ballina, New South Wales, Australia

== Heraldry ==
- Order of the Southern Cross, a Brazilian order of knighthood
- Eureka Flag or Southern Cross
- Southern Cross or Confederate flag, a flag of the Confederate States of America

== Places ==
- Southern Cross, Queensland, a locality in the Charters Towers Region, Australia
- Southern Cross, Victoria, a locality in Victoria, Australia
- Southern Cross, Western Australia, a town in Western Australia

== Transportation ==
=== Ships ===
- MS Southern Cross, a cruise ship
- Southern Cross (Melanesian Mission ship series)
- Southern Cross (1891 Melanesian Mission ship)
- Southern Cross (yacht), a yacht that challenged for the 1974 America's Cup
- SS Southern Cross, a list of steamships
- Southern Cross, steam yacht ex-Rover in the 1930s, when owned by Howard Hughes

=== Other transportation ===
- Southern Cross (automobile), an Australian automobile manufactured from 1931 to 1935
- Southern Cross (aircraft), the Fokker F.VIIB/3m flown by Sir Charles Kingsford Smith
- Southern Cross railway station, Melbourne, Australia
- Southern Cross railway station, Western Australia
- Southern Cross Route, a flight route between Australasia and Europe through the Americas

== Other uses ==
- Southern Cross Cable, a submarine communications cable
- Southern Cross Group (disambiguation), multiple uses
- Xanthosia rotundifolia, a plant species of Southwest Australia

== See also ==
- Berlin Südkreuz ('South Cross Berlin')
- Flags depicting the Southern Cross
- La Croix du Sud (disambiguation)
- Personal Ordinariate of Our Lady of the Southern Cross
- Southern Cross of Honor
- Southern Cross 28, an American yacht design
- Super Dimension Cavalry Southern Cross, a 1984 anime series from Japan brought to the US as part of Robotech
- Southern Cross Expedition 1898–1900, an expedition to Antarctica led by Carsten Borchgrevink
- Southern Cross News, the name of several news broadcasts
