= Jimmie Randall =

- Born: February 14, 1949 (age 76); Dallas, Texas, United States
- Instrument: Bass guitar

Jimmie Randall (born February 14, 1949, in Dallas, Texas) is a bass guitarist best known for his work with Jo Jo Gunne.

== Career ==
Jimmie Randall had been playing in several Texas bands since the early 1960s when, in 1972, he was invited to join Jo Jo Gunne as bass guitarist. It was a difficult task to replace a someone as highly regarded as Mark Andes, but Randall was a huge success and remained with the band until it folded.

His bass-playing was a complete departure from Andes's heavy drive. His jetglo Rickenbacker 4001 produced a brighter sound with more complicated basslines. Randall's influence is also credited with Jo Jo Gunne's hihigher volume at live shows. Big of stature, his presence dominated the stage visually as well as musically.

He played on three Jo Jo Gunne albums: Bite Down Hard, Jumpin' the Gunne and So Where's the Show.

Jimmie Randall now plays with fellow Jo Jo Gunne member John Staehely in The Dead Pyrates Society. He currently lives in Alpine, TX.
