= The Smoker You Drink, the Player You Get =

Studio album by Joe Walsh
- Released: June 18, 1973
- Recorded: During late 1972 – early 1973
- Studios: Record Plant (Los Angeles, California); Caribou Ranch (Nederland, Colorado)
- Genres: Rock; hard rock; blues rock
- Length: 35:44
- Label: ABC-Dunhill
- Producers: Joe Walsh; Bill Szymczyk

Joe Walsh chronology
Barnstorm (1972)	The Smoker You Drink, the Player You Get (1973)	So What (1974)

Singles from The Smoker You Drink, the Player You Get
- 1. "Rocky Mountain Way" Released: July 1973; 2. "Meadows" Released: December 1973

The Smoker You Drink, the Player You Get is the second solo studio album by American rock guitarist and singer Joe Walsh, released in 1973 by ABC-Dunhill Records in the United States and the United Kingdom, and was also released in Germany. It proved to be his commercial breakthrough, largely on the strength of the Top 40 hit single, "Rocky Mountain Way", which helped propel the album into the Top 10.

On this album, Walsh shares the vocals and songwriting with the other three members of Barnstorm: drummer/multi-instrumentalist Joe Vitale, bassist Kenny Passarelli, and new member, keyboardist Rocke Grace. As a result, a variety of styles are explored on this album; there are elements of blues, jazz, folk, pop, and even Caribbean music. However, the album is only credited to Walsh as a solo artist, not to Barnstorm, which led to the band's demise. After the success of this album, Walsh continued making albums as a solo artist.

== Cover artwork ==
The cover art for the album features a First World War era British Sopwith Snipe fighter plane, with fanciful coloration.

== Critical reception ==
Professional ratings
Review scores
Source	Rating
AllMusic	4.5/5 stars

Writing retrospectively for AllMusic, critic Ben Davies wrote of the album "Walsh's ability to swing wildly from one end of the rock scale to the other is unparalleled and makes for an album to suit many tastes... [it] features some of the most remembered Joe Walsh tracks, but it's not just these that make the album a success. Each of the nine tracks is a song to be proud of. This is a superb album by anyone's standards."

== Release history ==
In addition to the usual two channel stereo version this album was also released in a four channel quadraphonic edition on LP and 8-track tape in 1974. The quad LP is encoded using the QS Regular Matrix system. Audio Fidelity issued a limited 24-karat gold edition CD in 2009. This was followed in 2011 by a version in Japan with a miniature replica of the original sleeve in the SHM-CD format.

== Track listing ==
All songs written and composed by Joe Walsh, except where noted.

Side A
No.	Title	Writer(s)	Length
1.	"Rocky Mountain Way"	Joe Walsh; Joe Vitale; Kenny Passarelli; Rocke Grace	5:15
2.	"Bookends"	Vitale	2:45
3.	"Wolf"		3:09
4.	"Midnight Moodies"	Grace	3:39
5.	"Happy Ways"	Passarelli; Bernard Zoloth	2:40

Side B
No.	Title	Writer(s)	Length
6.	"Meadows"		4:36
7.	"Dreams"		5:50
8.	"Days Gone By"	Vitale	5:54
9.	"Daydream (Prayer)"		1:56
Total length:			35:44

Tracklist reflects the original vinyl release. Later releases (e.g. streaming services) spell "Daydream (Prayer)" as "(Day Dream) Prayer", and "Bookends" as "Book Ends".

== Personnel ==
Barnstorm

- Joe Walsh – guitars, keyboards, synthesizer, backing vocals, lead vocals (on 1, 3, 6, 7, 9)
- Kenny Passarelli – bass guitar, guitar, backing vocals, lead vocals (on 5)
- Joe Vitale – drums, percussion, piano, keyboards, flute, backing vocals, lead vocals (on 2, 8)
- Rocke Grace – keyboards, backing vocals

Session musicians

- Joe Lala – percussion
- Venetta Fields – backing vocals
- Clydie King – backing vocals

Production and artwork

- Joe Walsh – record producer
- Bill Szymczyk – record producer, engineering, mixing
- Mike D. Stone of the Record Plant – engineering
- Ron Albert (incorrectly spelled on the album as Ronnie Alpert) – engineering
- Al Blazek – engineering
- Jimmy Wachtel – album design
- Bob Jenkins – photography

== Charts ==
Chart (1973)	Peak position
Canada Top Albums/CDs (RPM)	2
US Billboard 200	6

== Certifications ==
Region	Certification	Certified units/sales
United Kingdom (BPI)	Silver	60,000^{^}
United States (RIAA)	Gold	500,000^{^}
^{^} Shipments figures based on certification alone.

== See also ==
- List of albums released in 1973
- Joe Walsh discography
