= Wasted on the Way =

Single by Crosby, Stills & Nash

from the album Daylight Again
- B-side: "Delta"
- Released: 1982
- Recorded: 1981
- Genre: Folk rock, rock
- Length: 2:52
- Label: Atlantic
- Songwriter: Graham Nash
- Producer: Crosby, Stills and Nash

Crosby, Stills & Nash singles chronology
"Fair Game" (1977)	"Wasted on the Way" (1982)	"Southern Cross" (1982)

"Wasted on the Way" is a 1982 song by American folk rock trio Crosby, Stills & Nash, featuring harmony vocals by Timothy B. Schmit. It was their first top 10 hit in five years, and peaked at #9 on the Billboard Hot 100 singles charts in August 1982. On the Adult Contemporary chart, "Wasted on the Way" was the group's biggest hit on the chart, peaking at number two for five weeks. It appeared on the band's 1982 album Daylight Again. The B-side was the David Crosby composition "Delta".

Graham Nash wrote "Wasted on the Way" and it became the album's biggest hit. The song, thematically, was about the time the group spent in squabbles and diversions rather than concentrating on their music. As with some other of the group's songs, water imagery is employed. American Songwriter magazine has written, "Graham Nash did an amazing job on 'Wasted on the Way' of taking these concerns, which were specific to his own experience, and transforming them into relatable life advice."

"Wasted on the Way" has remained popular among several soft rock radio formats, such as SiriusXM's The Blend.

== Personnel ==
- David Crosby — vocals
- Stephen Stills — vocals, guitars
- Graham Nash — vocals

=== Additional musicians ===
- Timothy B. Schmit — vocals
- Joel Bernstein — acoustic guitar
- Craig Doerge — keyboards
- Bob Glaub — bass
- Russ Kunkel — drums
- Joe Lala — percussion
- Wayne Goodwin — fiddle
- Michael Stergis — guitars

== Charts ==
=== Weekly charts ===
Chart (1982)	Peak position
Australia (Kent Music Report)	96
US Billboard Hot 100	9
US Mainstream Rock (Billboard)	9
US Hot Country Songs (Billboard)	87

=== Year-end charts ===
Year-end chart (1982)	Rank
US Top Pop Singles (Billboard)	57
