= Jo Jo Gunne =

American rock band

- Origin: Los Angeles, California, U.S.
- Genres: Rock
- Years active: 1971–1975; 2005
- Labels: Asylum; Blue Hand
- Past members: Jay Ferguson; Mark Andes; Matt Andes; William "Curly" Smith; Jimmie Randall; Starr Donaldson; John Staehely

Jo Jo Gunne was an American rock band formed in Los Angeles, California, United States, in 1971 by Jay Ferguson and Mark Andes after they had left the rock band Spirit. The band was named after the Chuck Berry song "Jo Jo Gunne". The band released their eponymous debut album in 1972 and had a top 10 hit song, "Run Run Run", in the UK. They released three further albums before disbanding in 1975. They reunited in 2005 for a time to record a fifth album, Big Chain.

== Career ==
Jo Jo Gunne was formed by Jay Ferguson (keyboards, vocals and guitar) and brothers Mark (bass and vocals) and Matt Andes (born February 6, 1949; guitar, vocals), along with William "Curly" Smith (born January 31, 1952, Wolf Point, Montana; drums, vocals, and harp) in 1971. Ferguson chose the group's name, "Jo Jo Gunne", from a 1958 Chuck Berry song about a monkey of that name that caused a fight between a lion and an elephant. They performed their first major show in Los Angeles in May 1971 before they were signed to Asylum Records.

The band's first album, Jo Jo Gunne, was released in 1972 and the album reached number 57 on Billboard's Top 100 Albums. The band had a number 6 hit in the UK Singles Chart in April 1972 with a song, "Run Run Run", taken from the album. It also received airplay on U.S. album-oriented rock FM radio stations. The song reached number 30 in Canada.

Their second album, Bite Down Hard, was a minor success, peaking on the Billboard Top 200 chart at number 75. Due to the lack of a breakout single, this album sold more poorly than their 1971 introductory effort. The album was produced by Bill Szymczyk, who was best known at the time for his production work on Joe Walsh's Barnstorm and B.B. King's Completely Well.

The band's third album, Jumpin' the Gunne, featuring an obese naked woman on the cover, failed to rise any higher than number 169 on the Billboard Top 200 chart. The band's fourth album, So...Where's the Show?, featured new guitarist John Staehely (a former member of Spirit), whose harder-edged sound complemented Ferguson's songs, giving the band a much harder rock sound than on their previous efforts. The group did not maintain the commercial momentum of their first release. They broke up in 1975.

== Personnel changes ==
Following the first album, Mark Andes left the band after a falling out with his brother Matt and Ferguson, and was replaced by Jimmie Randall. Randall introduced a brighter bass sound and helped increase the band's overall volume.

Matt Andes left after Jumpin' the Gunne, and was briefly replaced by Starr Donaldson (born September 23, 1950) in 1974. A replacement was soon found in John Staehely (born 25 January 1952, Austin, Texas), who had played on Feedback, the Spirit album that followed Ferguson and Andes's departure. Staehely's overdriven guitar was a significant change from Matt Andes's Ry Cooder–style slide guitar.

After the band broke up, Ferguson recorded several solo albums, which yielded the hit singles "Thunder Island" and "Shakedown Cruise". He then scored TV shows and several movies. Mark Andes joined Firefall and then Heart. Smith went on to have a career as a session drummer, played with Spirit in the 1980s, and Boston in three separate stints, from 1994-2000, 2012-2013 and 2014-2015.

== Reunion ==
The original line-up temporarily got back together around 1992. In a July 1995 interview in Vintage Guitar Magazine, Mark Andes recalls: "Curly Smith called me up and noted that it was the twentieth anniversary of when that band had formed; Steve Lukather took us into the studio and we recorded a lot of new material, but it didn't go anywhere".

They began recording again in 2005 in Santa Barbara at Jay Ferguson's studio. The 2005 recordings were eventually put out as an album, Big Chain, on Blue Hand Records. The music was co-produced by the band and engineered by Ferguson.

== Discography ==
=== Albums ===
Title	Album details	Peak chart positions		
Title	Album details	US	AUS	CAN
Jo Jo Gunne	Release date: February 7, 1972; Label: Asylum Records	57	18	55
Bite Down Hard	Release date: March 5, 1973; Label: Asylum	75	—	—
Jumpin' the Gunne	Release date: December 10, 1973; Label: Asylum	169	—	—
"So...Where's the Show?"	Release date: November 12, 1974; Label: Asylum	198	—	—
Big Chain	Release date: March 2005; Label: Blue Hand Records	—	—	—

=== Singles ===
- "Run Run Run" – No. 27 (US), No. 30 (Canada), No. 42 (Germany), No. 6 (UK)
- "Shake That Fat"
- "Ready Freddy"
- "Rock Around the Symbol"
- "I Wanna Love You"
- "Where Is the Show"
- "Take Me Down Easy"
- "Big, Busted Bombshell from Bermuda"

== See also ==
- List of Asylum Records artists
- List of 1970s one-hit wonders in the United States
- One-hit wonders in the UK
