= Southern Cross (folk song) =

Poetic ballad about hazards of harvesting harp seals

Song
- Written: 1914
- Genre: folk
- Songwriter: Traditional

The song "Southern Cross" is a traditional Newfoundland folk ballad describing the loss of Southern Cross on the south coast of Newfoundland with 173 men on board.

== Lyrics ==
She got up the steam twelfth day of March and shortly did embark.
To try her fortune in the Gulf in charge of Captain Clark.
She carried a hundred and seventy men, a strong and vigorous race,
Some from St. John's and Brigus, and some more from Harbour Grace.

She reached the Gulf in early March, the white-coats for to slew,
When seventeen thousand prime young harps killed by her hardy crew,
All panned and safely stowed below, with colours waving gay,
The Southern Cross she leaved the ice, bound up for home that day.

She passed near Channel homeward bound, as news came out next day,
To say a steamer from the Gulf she noe is on her way.
"No doubt it is the Southern Cross, "the operator said,
"And looking to have a bumper trip, and well down by the head."

The last of March the storm came on with blinding snow and sleet;
The Portia, bound for western ports, the Southern Cross did meet;
When Captain Connors from the bridge he saw the ship that day,
And thinking she would shelter up in St. Mary's Bay.

St. Mary's Bay she never reached, as news came out next morn.
She must have been all night at sea, out in that dreadful storm.
No word came from the Southern Cross now twenty days or more;
To say she reached a harbour around the western shore.

The SS Kyle was soon dispatched to search the ocean round,
But no sign of the missing ship could anywhere be found.
She searched Cape Race and every place until she reached Cape Pine,
But of the ship or wrecking the captain saw no sign.

The Southern Cross out twenty days, she now is overdue;
We hope, please God, she'll soon arrive and all her hearty crew,
But put your trust in Providence and trust to Him on high
To send the Southern Cross safe home and fill sad hearts with joy.

All things do happen for the best, but if they're called away,
The brave lads on the Southern Cross out in the storm that day,
We trust they reach the heavenly and rest with Him on high,
Where cares and sorrows are no more, but all is peace and joy.

== See also ==
- List of Newfoundland songs
- Southern Cross (Crosby, Stills and Nash song)
