= Barnstorm (album) =

Studio album by Joe Walsh and Barnstorm
- Released: October 1972
- Recorded: March 1972
- Studio: Caribou Ranch (Nederland, Colorado)
- Genres: Rock; folk rock; country rock; blues rock
- Length: 37:48
- Label: ABC-Dunhill
- Producer: Bill Szymczyk

Joe Walsh and Barnstorm chronology
Barnstorm (1972)	The Smoker You Drink, the Player You Get (1973)

Barnstorm is the debut studio album by the American rock band Barnstorm, which was formed by guitarist Joe Walsh after he left the James Gang. The album, credited to Walsh as his first solo album, was released in October 1972 on ABC-Dunhill Records. It was the first album to be recorded at Caribou Ranch in Colorado.

== History ==
With this album, Walsh moved away from the hard rock sound of the James Gang, with Barnstorm exploring a more folk-based, acoustic sound, influenced by such artists as James Taylor and Crosby, Stills, and Nash.

Walsh utilized the ARP Odyssey synthesizer on such songs as "Mother Says" and "Here We Go." Walsh also experimented with acoustic guitar, slide guitar, fuzzboxes and keyboards as well as running his guitar straight into a Leslie 122 speaker to get swirly, organ-like guitar tones. The lone hard rock track on Barnstorm, "Turn To Stone", has become the best known song from the album, and Walsh later re-recorded it for his solo album So What.

At the time of its release, Barnstorm was only moderately successful. For many years, the only CD version available was an expensive Japanese import. Nonetheless, the album became a cult classic among Walsh fans. It was later reissued in the U.S. on CD by Hip-O Select/Geffen Records in January 2006.

== Critical reception ==
Professional ratings
Review scores
Source	Rating
AllMusic	4.5/5 stars

Writing for AllMusic, critic Thom Jurek called the track "Birdcall Morning" a masterpiece and one of the greatest rock and roll love songs of the early 1970s. In his review, he wrote of the album "While it's true that Walsh established himself as a late-'60s/early-'70s guitar hero on the Gang's more boogie-oriented rock numbers, it's Walsh's love of lushly textured production and spacey, open-ended songs featuring both acoustic and electric guitars that is showcased here on this wildly adventurous and forgotten unqualified masterpiece... Walsh tips the scales one more time back to the mysterious in the acoustic guitar and harmonica moment "Comin' Down." It's another love song, which evokes the notion of the past as a way of creating a hopeful present. And it just whispers to a close, leaving the listener literally stunned at what has just transpired in the space of 35 minutes."

== 2011 reissue ==
On 29 December 2011, the original mix of the album was reissued in Japan in a miniature replica of the original album artwork. The album was remastered using Direct Stream Digital (DSD) to transfer the digital files. The release was a limited edition in the SHM-CD format. The reissue included a picture of the original vinyl label.

== Track listing ==
All songs written and composed by Joe Walsh, unless otherwise noted.

No.	Title	Writer(s)	Length
1.	"Here We Go"		4:58
2.	"Midnight Visitor"		3:13
3.	"One and One"		1:15
4.	"Giant Bohemoth"	Joe Vitale, Walsh	4:19
5.	"Mother Says"	Kenny Passarelli, Vitale, Walsh	6:14
6.	"Birdcall Morning"		3:42
7.	"Home"		2:53
8.	"I'll Tell the World"	Alan Gordon, Allan Jacobs	3:54
9.	"Turn to Stone"	Terry Trebandt, Walsh	5:16
10.	"Comin' Down"		1:54
Total length:			37:48

"I'll Tell the World" is titled "I'll Tell the World About You" on the ABC Dunhill Label fixed to the album.

== Personnel ==
Barnstorm

- Joe Walsh – lead guitar, keyboards, piano, synthesizer, telegraph key, vocals
- Kenny Passarelli – bass guitar, guitarrón, vocals
- Joe Vitale – drums, percussion, keyboards, electric piano, flute, vocals

Session musicians

- Paul Harris – piano, vocals
- Al Perkins – steel guitar
- Chuck Rainey – bass guitar
- Bill Szymczyk – backing vocals

Production

- Producer and engineer: Bill Szymczyk

== Charts ==
Chart (1973)	Peak position
US Billboard 200	79
