= So What (Joe Walsh album) =

Studio album by Joe Walsh
- Released: December 14, 1974
- Recorded: December 1973 – April 1974
- Studios: Record Plant (New York); Record Plant (Los Angeles); Record Plant (Sausalito, California)
- Genres: Rock; hard rock; country rock; pop rock; blues rock
- Length: 35:57
- Label: ABC-Dunhill
- Producers: Joe Walsh; John Stronach; Bill Szymczyk

Joe Walsh chronology
The Smoker You Drink, the Player You Get (1973)	So What (1974)	You Can't Argue with a Sick Mind (1976)

So What is the third studio album by the American singer-songwriter and multi-instrumentalist Joe Walsh. It was released in late 1974 on ABC-Dunhill Records.

It contains hard rock songs such as "Welcome To The Club" and a remake of the Barnstorm track, "Turn To Stone". It also contains more introspective material such as "Help Me Through the Night" and "Song For Emma".

On a few tracks, Don Henley, Glenn Frey, and Randy Meisner of the Eagles contributed backing vocals. Over a year and a half later, Walsh would be drafted into the Eagles to replace founding member Bernie Leadon, playing on their best-selling studio album Hotel California (1976).

== Production and recording ==
Two months before the release of the album, Walsh was asked about the album, and he said "I know this album's going to be an important one for me, but it's not easy to just crank them out anymore, I've got, what, six or seven albums out. I don't want the next album to sound like a bunch of outtakes from Smoker. I want it to be the difference between Revolver and Sgt. Pepper. I've held back [the album's release] until that development was there, even though the record company's been screaming for it. I want it to be a big, big step… in thoughts, vocals, playing and maturity."

Don Henley wrote the lyrics for "Falling Down" with Henley providing backing vocals on "Falling Down" and "Time Out". The album features three of the four members of Eagles; Don Henley, Glenn Frey and Randy Meisner providing backing vocals for "Turn to Stone" and "Help Me Through The Night". This would be the first time that the band members would appear on an album with the future Eagle.

"Song for Emma" was written as a memorial for Walsh's almost-three-year-old daughter who had been killed in a car crash on April 1, 1974, four weeks shy of her third birthday. The accident was caused by a driver who failed to stop at a stop sign, hitting the Porsche driven by his then-wife Stefany with Emma in the car. Later, Stevie Nicks wrote "Has Anyone Ever Written Anything for You?" for Walsh after visiting Emma's grave with him.

Producer Bill Szymczyk had the phrase "THAT'S NO BANANY, THATS MY NOZE" written on the first pressings of the vinyl's run out groove.

== Critical reception ==
Professional ratings
Review scores
Source	Rating
AllMusic	3/5 stars
The Village Voice	C+

Writing retrospectively for AllMusic, critic Ben Davies wrote of the album "A number of classic Walsh tracks are featured, including a more polished version of "Turn to Stone," originally featured on his debut album, Barnstorm, in a somewhat more riotous style... Most of the nine tracks feature solos of unquestionable quality in his usual rock style. The classic rock genre that the man so well defined with his earlier albums is present here throughout, and it is pulled off with the usual unparalleled Joe Walsh ability."

Record World said "Time Out" has "the perfect combination of [Walsh's] tasty, extended guitar licks and his vital vocal/lyric capabilities."

== Release history ==
The album was re-issued by MCA Records in 1979 as "Joe Walsh" and minus "All Night Laundry Mat Blues". It appeared in 2011 in Japan in a limited edition miniature replica sleeve in the SHM-CD format. Audio Fidelity released the album on the Super Audio CD format in 2015.

== Track listing ==
=== Original release ===
All tracks are written by Joe Walsh, except where noted.

No.	Title	Writer(s)	Length
1.	"Welcome to the Club"		5:14
2.	"Falling Down"	Walsh, Don Henley	4:56
3.	"Pavanne of the Sleeping Beauty" (from The Mother Goose Suite by Maurice Ravel)	Maurice Ravel	1:56
4.	"Time Out"	Walsh, Terry Trebandt	4:28
5.	"All Night Laundry Mat Blues"		0:58
6.	"Turn to Stone"	Walsh, Trebandt	3:47
7.	"Help Me Through the Night"		3:35
8.	"County Fair"		6:43
9.	"Song for Emma"		4:20
Total length:			35:57

=== Cassette tape DSC-50171 ===
Side one
No.	Title	Writer(s)	Length
1.	"Welcome to the Club"		5:01
2.	"Turn to Stone"		3:45
3.	"Falling Down"	Walsh, Don Henley	4:49
4.	"Time Out"	Terry Trebandt, Walsh	4:06

Side two
No.	Title	Writer(s)	Length
1.	"All Night Laundry Mat Blues"		1:02
2.	"Help Me Through the Night"		3:35
3.	"Song for Emma"		4:20
4.	"Pavanne for the Sleeping Beauty"	Maurice Ravel	2:03
5.	"County Fair"		6:41

== Personnel ==
=== Musicians ===
- Joe Walsh – vocals, background vocals (2), guitar (1–2; 4–8), Mellotron (1), bass (2; 4; 8–9), synthesizer (2; 4), Moog synthesizer (3), ARP synthesizer (3), Church organ (6), piano (8–9)
- James Bond – acoustic bass (9)
- Jody Boyer – background vocals (2)
- Dan Fogelberg – guitar (5), vocals (5)
- Glenn Frey – background vocals (6–7)
- Guille Garcia – conga (6)
- Bryan Garofalo – bass, background vocals (2)
- Ron Grinel – drums (2; 4)
- Don Henley – background vocals (2; 4; 6–7)
- Russ Kunkel – drums (9)
- Randy Meisner – background vocals (6–7)
- Kenny Passarelli – bass (1)
- JD Souther – background vocals (4)
- Leonard Southwick – harmonica (5)
- Tom Stephenson – organ (1; 6; 8)
- Joe Vitale – drums (1; 6–8)

=== Production ===
- Producers: Joe Walsh, John Stronach, Bill Szymczyk
- Engineers: Al Blazk, John Stronach, Bill Szymczyk
- Mixing: John Stronach, Bill Szymczyk
- Mastering: Rick Collins
- Design: Jimmy Wachtel
- Photography: Joe Walsh, Lorrie Sullivan
- Artwork: Jimmy Wachtel

== Charts ==
Chart (1973)	Peak position
Australian Albums (Kent Music Report)	55
Canada Top Albums/CDs (RPM)	19
US Billboard 200	11

== Certifications ==
Region	Certification	Certified units/sales
United States (RIAA)	Gold	500,000^{^}
^{^} Shipments figures based on certification alone.

== See also ==
- List of albums released in 1974
- Joe Walsh discography
