= Kenny Passarelli =

American bass guitarist (born 1949)

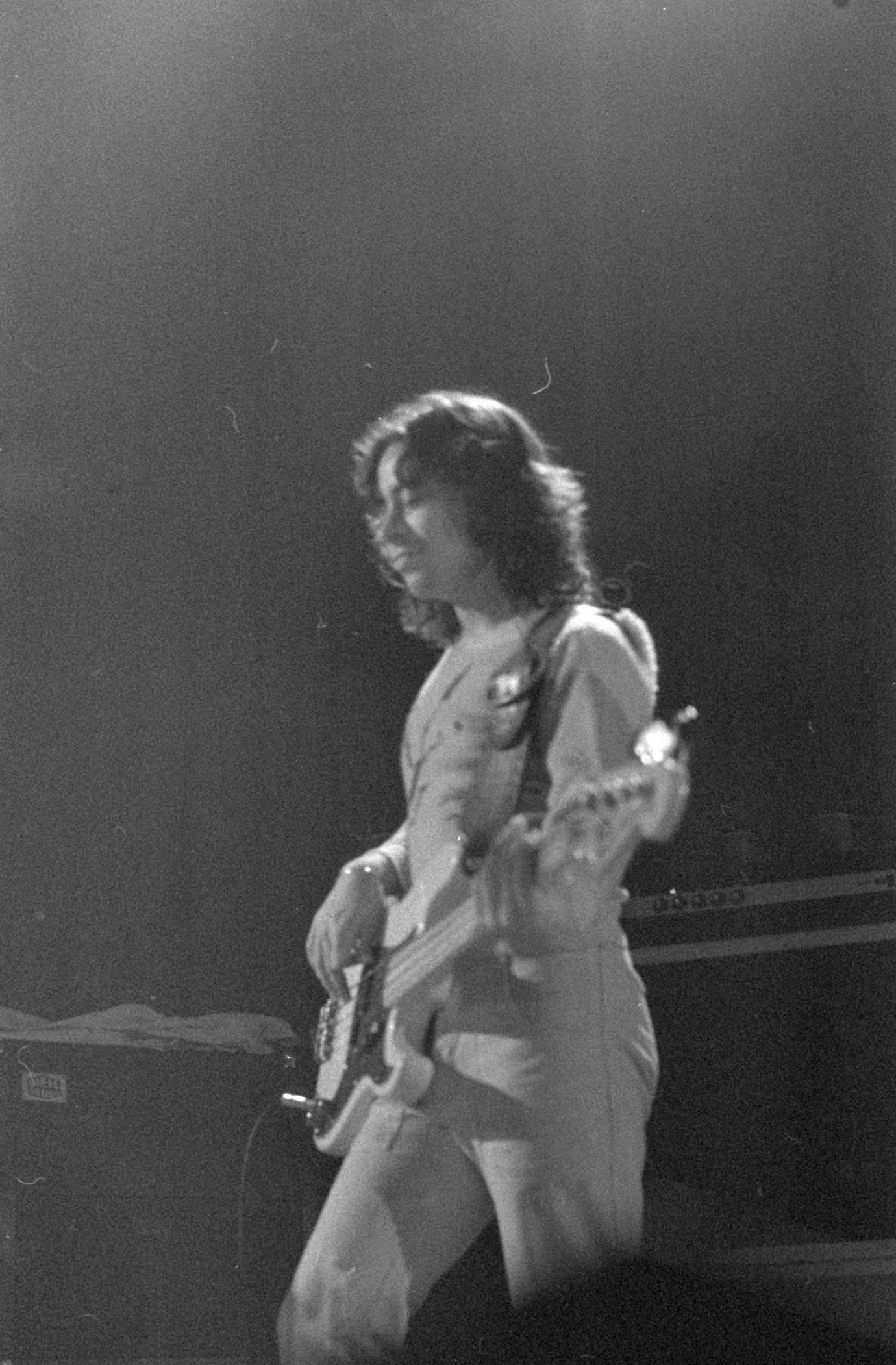
- Passarelli playing bass with Joe Walsh in 1973

Background information
- Also known as: Ken Passarelli
- Born: October 28, 1949 (age 76); Denver, Colorado, United States
- Genres: Rock and roll; blues rock
- Occupations: Musician; songwriter
- Instruments: Bass; trumpet; piano
- Years active: 1971–present

Kenny Passarelli (born October 28, 1949) is an American bass guitarist and musician. He has served as a contract player for a number of music acts, appearing in both session and live work throughout his career.

== Life and career ==
Kenny Passarelli was born in Denver, Colorado, to a Mexican-Italian American family. Passarelli learned to play the classical trumpet by taking classes at a young age, though when he was 15 or 16, he switched to playing the bass.

Kenny Passarelli co-wrote Joe Walsh’s single 1973 "Rocky Mountain Way". He has also played with a variety of rock musicians, including Elton John, Dan Fogelberg, Stephen Stills, Hall & Oates and Italian musician Edoardo Bennato.

== Collaborations ==
With Elton John

- Rock of the Westies (MCA, 1975)
- Blue Moves (Rocket, 1976)

With Bernie Taupin

- He Who Rides the Tiger (Elektra, 1980)

With Dan Fogelberg

- Souvenirs (Epic, 1974)
- The Innocent Age (Epic, 1981)
- Windows and Walls (Epic, 1984)

With Edoardo Bennato

- Non farti cadere le braccia (Ricordi, 1973)

With Eric Carmen

- Tonight You're Mine (Arista, 1980)

With Stephen Stills

- Stills (Columbia, 1975)
- The Live Album (Atlantic, 1975)

With Joe Walsh

- Barnstorm (ABC, 1972)
- The Smoker You Drink, the Player You Get (Dunhill, 1973)
- So What (Dunhill, 1974)
- There Goes the Neighborhood (Asylum, 1981)
- Analog Man (Fantasy, 2012)

With Yusuf Islam (Cat Stevens)

- Roadsinger (Island Records, 2009)

With Daryl Hall

- Sacred Songs (RCA, 1980)
