= Barnstorm (band) =

American rock supergroup

- Genres: Rock
- Years active: 1972–1974, 2017 (one off)
- Label: ABC
- Past members: Joe Walsh; Joe Vitale; Kenny Passarelli; Rocke Grace; Tommy Stephenson

Barnstorm was the power trio created by Joe Walsh in Colorado after he left the James Gang. The original members of the group were Walsh (guitars, keyboards), Joe Vitale (drums, flute, keyboards) and Kenny Passarelli (bass). Walsh and Vitale had previously played together in an Akron-based band called The Measles before Walsh joined the James Gang. All of the members contributed lead vocals and songs, although Walsh was the principal singer and songwriter. Later, the group added keyboardists Rocke Grace and Tommy Stephenson. Having two keyboardists permitted Barnstorm to play the complex arrangements live that it was creating through multitracking in the studio or through the use of session musicians such as Paul Harris (piano) and Joe Lala (percussion).

Barnstorm would record three albums over its two-year life (two as principals, Barnstorm and The Smoker You Drink, the Player You Get, plus serving as the backing band on Michael Stanley's Friends and Legends). All three albums were produced by Bill Szymczyk. Over time, Walsh became particularly frustrated by the way his record company, Dunhill Records, promoted the band, as if they were Joe Walsh solo albums and the others were his backing musicians. Said Walsh, "I wanted to be a band, not a solo artist. Vitale, especially, should've gotten more credit 'cause it wasn't all me. . . . It was in every aspect a collaborative effort."

Barnstorm thus disbanded in 1973, although Walsh and Vitale continued to work together on various projects over the next 20 years. Walsh continued to record as a solo artist; in 1975, Walsh joined the Eagles, also produced by Szymczyk. Passarelli joined Harris and Lala in Stephen Stills' band Manassas in 1973, and Elton John's backing band in 1975. Vitale first became a solo artist, but then joined Lala in the Stills-Young Band for the Long May You Run album and tour, which led to his joining the Crosby, Stills and Nash backing band, where he was rejoined by Passarelli. Later, he rejoined Walsh, playing drums and keyboards with the Eagles on tour. Stephenson went on to play with many of the great blues guitarists like Albert King, Albert Collins, and Chuck Berry as well as artists such as Paul Butterfield, Poco and many members of The Band.

In 2017, original members Walsh, Vitale, and Passarelli (under the name "Joe Walsh & Barnstorm") were inducted into the Colorado Music Hall of Fame. According to the organizers, Barnstorm's performance at the induction concert was its first performance in about 44 years.
