= Jay Ferguson (American musician) =

American musician (born 1947)

- Born: John Arden Ferguson; May 10, 1947 (age 79); Burbank, California, U.S.
- Genres: Pop rock; soft rock; yacht rock; AOR
- Instruments: Vocals; keyboards; guitar; percussion
- Years active: 1967–present
- Label: Asylum
- Website: jayferguson.com

John Arden "Jay" Ferguson (born May 10, 1947) is an American rock and pop musician known for his work with the bands Spirit and Jo Jo Gunne, and his 1978 solo hit "Thunder Island". His later career has been as a composer of music for television programs and films, most notably the theme song for the American version of The Office on NBC.

== Childhood and early musical career ==
Ferguson was born on May 10, 1947, in Burbank in the San Fernando Valley, California, to John Becker and Kathleen Jane Ferguson. He grew up in the Van Nuys and Canoga Park sections of Los Angeles. At 12 years old, Ferguson's parents encouraged his musical abilities with classical piano lessons. When he was 16, Ferguson's interest transferred to the banjo. Along with his brother Tom, an accomplished fiddle player, he formed a bluegrass group called The Oat Hill Stump Straddlers including Michael Fondiler and Steve Fondiler. Ferguson was also a member of local garage bands Western Union and The Red Roosters, as was Michael Fondiler.

He also held part-time jobs at different points as a theater usher and an architect's assistant for his father John Ferguson, and taught piano in a music store and studied at UCLA after high school.

== Spirit ==
Spirit was founded in the mid-1960s. Many musicians of the time cited The Beatles and their music as an influence, and Ferguson was no exception. Reuniting with longtime musician friends Randy California and California's stepfather Ed Cassidy, who, with Mark Andes and John Locke were in a band called the Red Roosters - Ferguson joined with them to form a jazz influenced rock group that was originally called Spirits Rebellious, after a Khalil Gibran passage. With the general consensus that the moniker was too long, they later shortened the name to Spirit. Ferguson was the last member to join the band and found himself in the position of lead vocalist and percussionist.

Ferguson shared singing and songwriting duties with California, writing most of the songs on their first album. Spirit began playing at various nightclubs and concerts in the Los Angeles area, especially the clubs along the Sunset Strip, including Whisky a Go Go. At one of these shows, French film producer Jacques Demy saw Spirit perform and decided he wanted them in his next film. It led to a cameo role for the band and a short speaking part in which Ferguson played a character based loosely on himself in the film Model Shop. Spirit also provided much of the instrumental soundtrack. The band went on to tour and record several albums.

== Jo Jo Gunne ==
Ferguson and Mark Andes decided to leave Spirit in 1971 and form their own band.

Ferguson was Jo Jo Gunne's main songwriter (writing virtually all the material) and only lead vocalist. Jo Jo Gunne became the second act signed to the new Asylum Records label. The band scored a moderate hit with the single "Run Run Run" from their debut album (1972).

With the first record and some touring already completed, Mark Andes decided to leave and join a band that would later become Firefall, with his brother Matt staying behind with Jo Jo Gunne. Jimmie Randall, an Austin, Texas, bassist was recruited in Mark's place.

Jo Jo Gunne toured all over the US and Europe for the next three years, and recorded three more albums, Bite Down Hard (1973), Jumpin' the Gunne (1973) and "So...Where's the Show?" (1974). Matt Andes left the band after the third album and was temporarily replaced with Star Donaldson on lead guitar, and then, later, John Staehely. After a four-year existence, the group split up in the mid-1970s. Jo Jo Gunne reformed in 2005, and recorded a new album, Big Chain, which included both new material and new versions of several old Gunne songs.

== Solo career ==
Ferguson took a year and a half off to rest, until record producer Bill Szymczyk asked Ferguson to come down to his Coconut Grove recording studio in Miami. He contributed in 1975 on piano and vocals to Joe Walsh's live recording of You Can't Argue with a Sick Mind, before Walsh subsequently went on to join Eagles. Ferguson recorded three studio albums and a limited-run live album for Asylum. While managed by Martin Pichinson, he scored a Top 10 hit with the title track on his second solo album, Thunder Island (1978), which peaked at No. 9 in the US. Another minor hit was "Shakedown Cruise" (No. 31) from his last Asylum album, Real Life Ain't This Way. After his recording contract for Asylum was completed, Ferguson changed record labels, and recorded two more solo albums for Capitol Records. In 1983, his keyboards and bass were a prominent contribution to Language, a 5-track EP by acclaimed Texas guitarist Gary Myrick, who was exploring a new-wave direction at the time. In 2025, he released a new solo album The Faultline on streaming platforms.

== Soundtrack composer ==
In 1982, after his fifth solo album, White Noise, Ferguson decided to become a soundtrack composer for movies and television. To date, he has written music for over 15 feature films and for many TV shows. His most recognizable composition as a TV and film scorer is the theme to the NBC-TV version of The Office, which won him the 2007 Film & TV Music Award for Best Score for a Comedy Television Program. (In The Office, he is also the guitarist in Kevin's band "Scrantonicity".) He is the composer of "Pictures of You" from the soundtrack to The Terminator, and the entire score to A Nightmare on Elm Street 5: The Dream Child and Bad Dreams, the Tales from the Crypt episode "Forever Ambergris", as well as Tremors 2: Aftershocks, and Tremors 4: The Legend Begins. Ferguson was also a soundtrack composer for NCIS: Los Angeles, having replaced original composer James S. Levine halfway through season one with Ferguson's music debuting in the season 1 episode, "Chinatown".

== Discography ==
=== Albums ===
- 1976: All Alone in the End Zone (Asylum Records)
- 1977: Jay Ferguson Live (Asylum) (promotional issue only)
- 1977: Thunder Island (Asylum) U.S. No.72
- 1979: Real Life Ain't This Way (Asylum) U.S. No.86
- 1980: Terms and Conditions (Capitol Records)
- 1982: White Noise (Capitol) U.S. No.178
- 1989: A Nightmare on Elm Street 5: The Dream Child (soundtrack) (Varèse Sarabande)
- 2025: The Faultline

=== Singles ===
- 1976: "Medicated Goo"
- 1977: "Thunder Island" - U.S. No.9, Canada No.8
- 1978: "Losing Control"
- 1979: "Shakedown Cruise" - U.S. No.31, Canada No.48
- 1979: "Paying Time"
- 1980: "Terms and Conditions"
- 1982: "Tonite (Fallin' for Ya)"
