= Joe Vitale (musician) =

American musician (b. 1949)

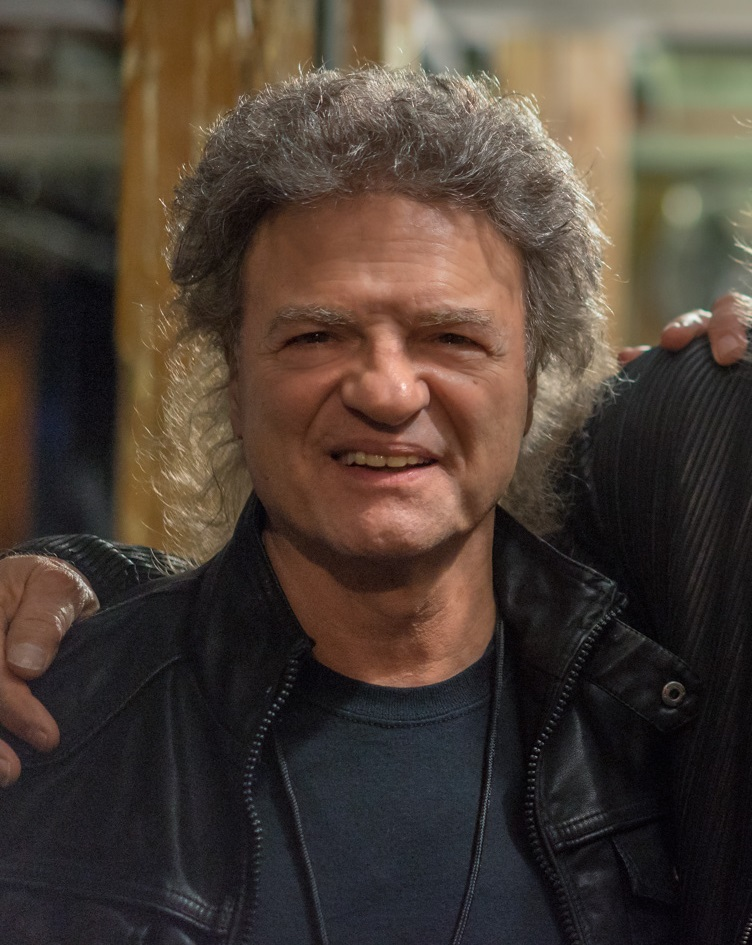
- Vitale at the Capitol Theatre in Port Chester, New York, 2015

Background information
- Born: Joseph Anthony Vitale; April 2, 1949 (age 77); Canton, Ohio, U.S.
- Genres: Rock; hard rock; pop rock; soft rock; reggae fusion
- Occupations: Singer; songwriter; multi-instrumentalist
- Instruments: Vocals; drums; keyboards; flute; bass guitar
- Years active: 1969–present
- Labels: ABC; Asylum; Atlantic; Hit; LLC
- Formerly of: Barnstorm; The Chylds
- Website: joevitaleondrums.com

Joseph Anthony Vitale (born April 2, 1949) is an American singer, songwriter, and multi-instrumentalist. In a career spanning more than 55 years, Vitale has played with many of the top names in music during a career dating back to the 1970s.

Vitale pursued a solo career and released his debut studio album Roller Coaster Weekend in 1974. Since then, he has released two studio albums. His only single to chart is "Lady on the Rock".

== Early life ==
Of Italian heritage, Joseph Anthony Vitale was born on April 2, 1949, in Canton, Ohio. He started playing the drums at an early age, as his father was a barber, and would trade haircuts for drum lessons for Joe. The Vitales moved to Florida for a short time, where Joe played in a youth orchestra, but they soon moved back to Ohio.

In high school Vitale played for a while with a band called the Knights. He formed a polka band with his brother and father called the Tony Vitale Trio, with his father on accordion and his brother on bass guitar, but the band was short-lived and didn't make any studio or live recordings. In 1965 the polka band and a rock band called the Echoes were both playing at the Magnolia Homecoming. The Echoes' drummer didn't attend the gig, so Vitale played drums for them. As a result, he joined the Echoes as their regular drummer.

== Career ==
=== Beginnings ===
Vitale started his professional music career with the Echoes, who signed a recording contract with Warner and became the Chylds (1964–68). He gained valuable experience with the band and sang lead vocals on their single "I Want More (Lovin')." He eventually enrolled at Kent State University and was attending during the May 4, 1970, shootings. Vitale also played with Marble Cake, a band out of Kent, Ohio, from 1968 to 1970. His first national break came when Ted Nugent hired him to play drums in the Amboy Dukes in 1972.

=== Joe Walsh ===
That fall Vitale was invited by his former Kent State classmate Joe Walsh to join Barnstorm, a new band being formed by Walsh in Colorado. The band recorded two studio albums together and Vitale and Walsh began a longtime partnership (including co-writing "Rocky Mountain Way"), although Barnstorm broke up in 1974.

After the breakup, Vitale was (temporarily) the original drummer for the Michael Stanley Band (before Tommy Dobeck), and he recorded his debut solo studio album, 1974's Roller Coaster Weekend, produced by Ron and Howard Albert, with guitar solos contributed by Walsh, Rick Derringer and Phil Keaggy. He then joined the Stills-Young Band for the Long May You Run sessions. Later, Vitale became part of the Crosby, Stills & Nash touring and recording band, beginning with the CSN album and continuing until 2009. He has also co-produced and contributed songs to Crosby, Stills & Nash as well as to solo efforts by David Crosby, Stephen Stills, Graham Nash.

=== Association with Eagles ===
In 1975 Vitale's partner Walsh joined Eagles and Vitale became part of the 90s Eagles' touring band playing drums, keyboards, and singing backing vocals. The Walsh/Vitale song "Pretty Maids All in a Row" appears on the Eagles' fifth studio album Hotel California (1976). He is also credited on The Long Run (1979) and the band's concert recording Eagles Live (1980). For Vitale's second solo studio album, Plantation Harbor, produced by Bill Szymczyk and also recorded in 1981, Don Felder appeared along with Walsh on guitars, and Stephen Stills co-wrote one of the songs. He continued to appear on Walsh solo albums in the early 1990s.

Among the artists with whom Vitale has appeared are Outlaws (Hurry Sundown, 1977), Dan Fogelberg (Windows and Walls, 1984), Peter Frampton, John Entwistle (Too Late the Hero, 1981) and Zakk Wylde (Book of Shadows, 1996).

In December 2008, Vitale released his third and to date final solo Speaking in Drums. The album is a collection of eleven songs written and performed by Joe, his wife Susie and his son Joe Jr., among other guests. In 2008 he also released Backstage Pass, a biography written by his wife.

In 2012, Joe Vitale appeared on the studio album The Healing Song by author and spiritual teacher Joseph Vitale (same name, different artist). Included on the recording are fellow musicians Glenn Fukunaga on bass (Robert Plant), Daniel Barrett on guitar (Porterdavis) and Grammy-winning artist David Darling performing on cello.

Vitale also wrote or co-wrote many songs with Joe Walsh.

== Personal life ==
Vitale married his wife Susie in 1974. She is a graduate of Kent State University and conducted post graduate studies at Malone University and the University of Akron. She has served as president of the Community Television Consortium in Canton and as host of the TV program What's Happening in Stark County. They have a son, Joe Vitale, Jr.

== Discography ==
- Roller Coaster Weekend (1974)
- Plantation Harbor (1981)
- Speaking in Drums (2008)

Session musician work

With David Crosby

- Oh Yes I Can (A&M Records, 1989)

With Crosby, Stills & Nash

- CSN (Atlantic Records, 1977)
- Daylight Again (Atlantic Records, 1982)
- Allies (Atlantic Records, 1983)
- American Dream (Atlantic Records, 1988)
- Live It Up (Atlantic Records, 1990)
- Looking Forward (Reprise Records, 1999)

With John Entwistle

- Too Late the Hero (Atco Records, 1981)

With Don Felder

- Airborne (Asylum Records, 1983)

With Dan Fogelberg

- Nether Lands (Epic Records, 1977)
- Windows and Walls (Epic Records, 1984)

With Rick Derringer

- All American Boy (1973)

With Al Kooper

- Championship Wrestling (Columbia Records, 1982)

With Graham Nash

- Earth & Sky (Capitol Records, 1980)

With Boz Scaggs

- Middle Man (Columbia Records, 1980)

With Stephen Stills

- Illegal Stills (Columbia Records, 1976)
- Thoroughfare Gap (Columbia Records, 1978)
- Man Alive! (Pyramid Records, 2005)

With Mickey Thomas

- Alive Alone (Elektra Records, 1981)

With Joe Walsh

- Barnstorm (ABC Records, 1972)
- The Smoker You Drink, the Player You Get (ABC Records, 1973)
- So What (ABC Records, 1974)
- But Seriously, Folks... (Asylum Records, 1978)
- There Goes the Neighborhood (Asylum Records, 1981)
- You Bought It – You Name It (Warner Bros. Records, 1983)
- Ordinary Average Guy (Epic Records, 1991)
- Songs for a Dying Planet (Epic Records, 1992)
- Analog Man (Fantasy Records, 2012)

With Ella May Saison

- So in Love (1997)

With Bill Wyman

- Stone Alone (Atlantic Records, 1976)
