= Asylum Records =

American record label

- Current logo since 2004
- Parent company: Warner Music Group
- Founded: 1971; 55 years ago
- Founder: David Geffen; Elliot Roberts
- Status: Active
- Distributors: Atlantic Records; (United States/United Kingdom); Warner Music Group; (International); Rhino Entertainment Company; (Re-issues)
- Genre: Various (Note: Folk rock and country rock (1971–1980s), country (1990s, 2003–present under Asylum-Curb sub-label), hip-hop, rock, and alternative metal (2004–present))
- Country of origin: United States
- Official website: asylumrecords.com

Asylum Records is an American record label, founded in 1971 by David Geffen and partner Elliot Roberts. It was taken over by Warner Communications (now the Warner Music Group) in 1972, and later merged with Elektra Records to become Elektra/Asylum Records.

After previous incarnations, it is geared primarily towards hip-hop, along with rock and alternative metal. It is owned and distributed by Warner Music Group.

== History ==
=== Formation ===
Original logo

Asylum was founded in 1971 by David Geffen, and partner Elliot Roberts, both of whom had previously worked as agents at the William Morris Agency, and operated a folk/rock label. They had also previously founded their own management company. While unsuccessfully pitching a recording contract for their client Jackson Browne to Atlantic Records president Ahmet Ertegun, Geffen said, "You'll make a lot of money." Ertegun replied, "You know what, David, I have a lot of money. Why don't you start a record company and then you'll have a lot of money." A deal was then struck in which Ertegun would put up the initial funds, Atlantic Records would distribute Asylum Records, and the profits would be split 50/50.

Although they knew they would sign Browne, the first act that Geffen asked to join the label was his close friend Laura Nyro, whose career he was managing at the time. Nyro initially agreed, but without Geffen's knowledge she changed her mind and re-signed with Columbia Records. Geffen said it was the biggest betrayal of his life up to that point and that he "cried for days".

Asylum's early releases were distributed by Atlantic Records. The same year, Asylum signed Jo Jo Gunne, Linda Ronstadt, John David Souther, Judee Sill, David Blue, Joni Mitchell and Glenn Frey (whom Geffen encouraged to form the Eagles, with Don Henley, Bernie Leadon, and Randy Meisner). In 1972, then folk-based singer/songwriter Tom Waits signed with the label, releasing his debut, Closing Time, in 1973. His seventh and final album for the label, Heartattack and Vine, was released in 1980. Former Creedence Clearwater Revival frontman John Fogerty signed with the label in 1974. The biggest coup for Asylum was signing Bob Dylan, who had been with Columbia Records since the early 1960s but who, after a falling-out with the company, was shopping around for a new label. Dylan recorded two albums, Planet Waves and the live Before the Flood, for Asylum before returning to Columbia. Columbia reissued Dylan's two Asylum albums in 1981.

=== Merger with Elektra Records ===
Asylum logo used between 1973 and 1980

Asylum was taken over by Warner Communications in 1973 and merged with Elektra Records to become Elektra/Asylum Records. David Geffen and Elliot Roberts each received $2 million in cash and $5 million in Warner Communications stock, thereby becoming two of the company's largest shareholders. Geffen served as president and chairman of Elektra/Asylum Records until 1975, when he crossed over to film and was named vice-chairman of Warner Bros. One of Asylum's most prominent signings after Geffen's departure was Warren Zevon, who released a series of successful and critically acclaimed LPs for the label; his self-titled 1976 label debut has been called the best California rock album of the decade.

By the early 1980s, although the copyright lines on albums still read "Elektra/Asylum Records" or "Elektra/Asylum/Nonesuch Records", Elektra was becoming the more prominent of the two labels with Asylum turning into a secondary imprint. By the middle of the decade, the company was unofficially calling itself Elektra Records, and in 1989 it was renamed Elektra Entertainment. By this time Asylum's remaining acts had been shifted to the Elektra roster, although catalog recordings and reissues continued to be sold with the Asylum label on them.

=== Country format ===
Asylum was reformatted into a country music label, still operated by Elektra, in 1992. Under the new format, Asylum scored successful recordings by such acts as Emmylou Harris, Brother Phelps, Thrasher Shiver, Kevin Sharp, Bryan White, and Lila McCann. They also produced many critically acclaimed albums by artists such as George Jones, Mandy Barnett, Guy Clark, The Cox Family, Bob Woodruff, Monte Warden, JD Myers and Jamie Hartford (although the last two artists' albums were initially shelved. By the end of the decade, however, mismanagement and a lack of promotion money led to the dissolution of the Asylum country label.

In 2003, Mike Curb, head of Curb Records, revived the Nashville division of Asylum, forming a new label known as Asylum-Curb. LeAnn Rimes, Clay Walker, Lee Brice, Rio Grand, Hank Williams, Jr. and Wynonna were among the artists on the Asylum-Curb division.

=== Relaunch ===
After being dormant for several years, Asylum Records was revived as an urban music-based label in 2004, with some of its releases distributed in conjunction with Warner Bros. Records and others through Atlantic Records. Asylum found success with American rapper Paul Wall. Asylum released Paul Wall's commercial debut studio album, The Peoples Champ‚ in September 2005. The album debuted and peaked at number one on the Billboard 200, and was ultimately certified Platinum in America. In 2006, WMG shifted Asylum to operate under their newly created Independent Label Group, which also comprises Cordless Recordings and East West Records. In December 2006, Asylum Records announced the signing of Atlanta, Georgia-based metal band Sevendust, the first non-hip-hop artist to be signed to the newly reconfigured label. On March 30, 2009, Asylum president and CEO Todd Moscowitz was promoted to co-president of Warner Bros. Records Inc. Subsequently, Asylum was detached from the Independent Label Group and operated under Warner Bros. from 2009 to 2013 before being moved to Atlantic. Cee Lo Green was signed to the label as well as New Boyz and Ed Sheeran. The label achieved its first number 1 hit on the UK Singles Chart with "Feel the Love" by Rudimental in May 2012. The label was relaunched in the US in 2017, operating separately from the UK label.

== See also ==
- List of Asylum Records artists
