= Crosby, Stills, Nash & Young discography =

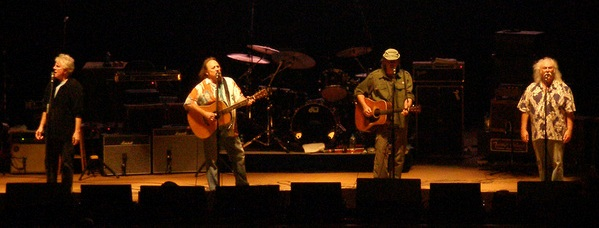
- Nash, Stills, Young, & Crosby, left to right at the PNC Arts Center, August 20, 2006
- Studio albums: 8
- Live albums: 6
- Compilation albums: 8
- Singles: 19
- Video albums: 4
- Music videos: 7
- Guest singles: 1
- Soundtrack appearances: 3

The core discography of supergroup Crosby, Stills, Nash & Young consists of eight studio albums, six live albums, eight compilation albums, four video albums, and 19 singles. Originally formed in 1968, the group released one album as the trio Crosby, Stills & Nash before recruiting Neil Young into the band for their first concerts in 1969. Of the band's eight studio albums, three have also included Young; and of the group's numerous tours, the quartet configuration has made concert tours in 1969, 1970, 1974, 2000, 2002, and 2006.

The group's second album, Déjà Vu, remains its most successful, selling over eight million copies. All of the group members were songwriters on some of their biggest hits—"Suite: Judy Blue Eyes", "Teach Your Children", and "Ohio"—being written by Stills, Nash, and Young respectively. The group has also recorded songs by other writers, such as the hit single "Woodstock" written by Joni Mitchell. All members pursued careers independent of the group. As solo artists, Crosby and Nash have each earned one gold record, Stills has three, the pair of Crosby and Nash also three, and a one-time pair of Stills and Young has one, whilst Young has multiple gold and platinum albums in his discography. The trio configuration has sold around 13 million albums, while the quartet has sold around 20 million. Combined sales of the group including solo, duo, trio and quartet versions is over 70 million.

== Albums ==
=== Studio albums ===
Title	Album details	Peak chart positions										Certifications (sales thresholds)
Title	Album details	US	CAN	AUS	NL	NO	SW	FR	SPA	GER	UK	Certifications (sales thresholds)
Crosby, Stills & Nash	Released: May 29, 1969; Label: Atlantic; Format: LP, CD, cassette, 8-track	6	2	10	2	—	—	—	4	—	25	US: 4× Platinum; AUS: Platinum; France: Gold; UK: Gold
Déjà Vu	Released: March 11, 1970; Label: Atlantic; Format: LP, CD, cassette, 8-track	1	1	1	1	11	2	3	8	12	5	US: 7× Platinum; France: Platinum; UK: Gold; Germany: Gold; Switzerland: Gold; Italy: Gold
CSN	Released: June 17, 1977; Label: Atlantic; Format: LP, CD, cassette, 8-track	2	9	7	4	10	17	23	21	—	23	US: 4× Platinum
Daylight Again	Released: June 21, 1982; Label: Atlantic; Format: LP, CD, cassette	8	30	46	14	14	18	18	—	31	—	US: Platinum
American Dream	Released: November 1, 1988; Label: Atlantic; Format: CD, cassette	16	5	47	58	—	26	—	—	48	—	US: Platinum
Live It Up	Released: June 26, 1990; Label: Atlantic; Format: LP, CD, cassette	57	58	—	59	—	—	—	—	—	—	
After the Storm	Released: August 16, 1994; Label: Atlantic; Format: CD, cassette	98	—	—	71	—	—	—	—	—	—	
Looking Forward	Released: October 26, 1999; Label: Reprise; Format: LP, CD, cassette	26	17	—	15	7	26	60	—	10	54	
"—" denotes releases that did not chart.

=== Live albums ===
Year	Album details	Peak chart positions										Certifications (sales thresholds)
Year	Album details	US	CAN	AUS	NL	NO	SW	GE	FR	ITA	UK	Certifications (sales thresholds)
4 Way Street	Released: April 7, 1971; Label: Atlantic; Format: LP, CD, cassette, 8-track	1	2	6	3	8	13	—	4	11	5	US: 4× Platinum; France: Gold; Germany: Gold
Allies	Released: June 6, 1983; Label: Atlantic; Format: LP, CD, cassette	43	92	—	39	—	—	44	—	—	—	
Déjà Vu Live	Released: July 22, 2008; Label: Reprise; Format: CD, LP	153	—	—	48	—	—	42	192	85	—	
CSN 2012	Released: July 2, 2012; Label: CSN; Format: CD, DVD, Blu-ray, download	—	—	—	—	—	—	—	—	—	—	
CSNY 1974	Release date: July 8, 2014; Label: Rhino; Format: CD, DVD, Blu-ray, download	17	—	—	13	32	9	11	38	48	37	
Live at Fillmore East, 1969	Release date: October 25, 2024; Label: Rhino; Format: CD, LP	—	—	—	52	—	—	25	—	—	—	
"—" denotes releases that did not chart.

=== Compilation albums ===
Year	Album details	Peak positions								Certifications (sales thresholds)
Year	Album details	US	CAN	NL	NZ	ITA	AUS	SCO	UK	Certifications (sales thresholds)
So Far	Released: August 19, 1974; Label: Atlantic; Format: LP, CD, cassette, 8-track	1	1	—	—	—	77	—	25	US: 6× Platinum; Canada: Gold
Replay	Released: December 8, 1980; Label: Atlantic; Format: LP, CD, cassette	122	—	—	—	—	—	—	—	
CSN	Released: October 15, 1991; Label: Atlantic; Format: CD, CS	109	—	—	—	—	—	—	—	US: Platinum
Carry On	Released: December 2, 1991; Label: Atlantic; Format:	—	—	58	—	—	—	—	—	AUS: Platinum; UK: Gold
Greatest Hits	Released: March 15, 2005; Label: Rhino Entertainment; Format:	24	—	—	6	59	—	34	38	US: Gold; UK: Gold
Demos	Released: June 2, 2009; Label: Rhino Entertainment; Format:	104	—	—	—	—	—	—	—	
Déjà Vu 50th Anniversary	Released: May 14, 2021; Label: Rhino Entertainment; Format:	159	—	8	—	54	—	12	77	
Déjà Vu Alternates	Released: July 17, 2021; Label: Rhino Entertainment; Format:	107	—	51	—	—	—	29	—	
"—" denotes releases that did not chart.

== Soundtrack appearances ==
Soundtrack	Album details	Songs	Chart positions										Certifications
Soundtrack	Album details	Songs	US	AUS	NZ	NL	NO	JP	ITA	GE	CAN	UK	Certifications
Woodstock: Music from the Original Soundtrack and More	Released: 1970; Label: Cotillion; Format: LP	"Suite: Judy Blue Eyes" "Sea of Madness" "Wooden Ships"	1	2	—	2	8	12	2	10	1	35	US: 2× Platinum
Woodstock 2	Released: 1971; Label: Cotillion; Format: LP	"Guinnevere" "4+20" "Marrakesh Express"	7	12	—	6	17	—	16	—	6	—	US: Gold
No Nukes	Released: 1979; Label: Asylum Records; Format: LP	"You Don't Have to Cry" "Long Time Gone" "Teach Your Children" "Cathedral"	14	18	35	34	12	—	—	—	53	—	US: Gold

== Singles ==
Year	Single (A-side, B-side)	Peak chart positions										Certifications	Album
Year	Single (A-side, B-side)	US	US AC	AUS	CAN	FR	NL	NZ	JPN	SPA	UK	Certifications	Album
1969	"Marrakesh Express" b/w "Helplessly Hoping"	28	28	—	17	—	—	—	—	22	17		Crosby, Stills & Nash
1969	"Suite: Judy Blue Eyes" b/w "Long Time Gone"	21	10	50	11	—	30	—	—	—	—		Crosby, Stills & Nash
1970	"Woodstock" b/w "Helpless"	11	—	19	3	21	—	—	49	—	—		Déjà Vu
1970	"Teach Your Children" b/w "Carry On"	16	28	11	8	—	7	19	56	—	—		Déjà Vu
1970	"Ohio" b/w "Find the Cost of Freedom"	14	—	44	16	—	13	—	—	—	—		So Far (Note: "Ohio" was a non-album single later included on 1974 So Far compilation)
1970	"Our House" b/w "Déjà Vu"	30	20	51	13	—	9	19	—	—	—	UK: Silver	Déjà Vu
1977	"Just a Song Before I Go" b/w "Dark Star"	7	5	59	10	30	23	—	—	—	—		CSN
1977	"Fair Game" b/w "Anything at All"	43	—	—	42	—	—	—	—	—	—		CSN
1978	"I Give You Give Blind" b/w "Carried Away"	—	—	—	—	—	—	—	—	—	—		CSN
1980	"Carry On" b/w "Shadow Captain"	—	—	—	—	—	—	—	—	—	—		Replay
1982	"Wasted on the Way" b/w "Delta"	9	2 (Note: "Wasted on the Way" reached number 9 on the Mainstream Rock chart and number 87 Country songs chart)	96	3 (AC)	53	38	—	—	—	—		Daylight Again
1982	"Southern Cross" b/w "Into the Darkness"	18	6 (Note: "Southern Cross" reached number 39 on the Mainstream Rock chart)	—	1 (AC)	—	—	—	—	—	—		Daylight Again
1983	"Too Much Love to Hide" b/w "Song for Susan"	69	— (Note: "Too Much Love to Hide" reached number 46 on the Mainstream Rock chart)	—	—	—	—	—	—	—	—		Daylight Again
1983	"War Games" b/w "Shadow Captain"	45	— (Note: "War Games" reached number 13 on the Mainstream Rock chart)	—	41	—	—	—	—	—	—		Allies
1983	"Raise a Voice" b/w "For What It's Worth"	—	—	—	—	—	—	—	—	—	—		Allies
1988	"American Dream" b/w "Compass"	—	49 (Note: "American Dream" reached number 4 on the Mainstream Rock chart)	53	3	—	—	—	—	—	55		American Dream
1988	"Night Time for the Generals"	—	— (Note: "Night Time for the Generals" reached number 39 on the Mainstream Rock chart)	—	—	—	—	—	—	—	—		American Dream
1989	"Got It Made"	69	11 (Note: "Got it Made" reached number 1 on the Mainstream Rock chart)	—	16	—	—	—	—	—	—		American Dream
1989	"This Old House"	—	— (Note: "This Old House" reached number 92 on the Country chart)	—	—	—	—	—	—	—	—		American Dream
1989	"That Girl"	—	— (Note: "That Girl" reached number 25 on the Mainstream Rock chart)	—	—	—	—	—	—	—	—		American Dream
1990	"Chippin' Away" (featuring James Taylor)	—	45	—	—	—	—	—	—	—	—		non-album single
1990	"Live It Up" b/w "Chuck's Lament" (non-album track)	—	— (Note: "Live It Up" reached number 7 on the Mainstream Rock chart)	—	53	—	—	—	—	—	—		Live It Up
1990	"If Anybody Had a Heart"	—	— (Note: "If Anybody Had a Heart" reached number 44 on the Mainstream Rock chart)	—	—	—	—	—	—	—	—		Live It Up
1990	"(Got to Keep) Open"	—	—	—	—	—	—	—	—	—	—		Live It Up
1994	"Only Waiting for You"	—	—	—	84	—	—	—	—	—	—		After the Storm
1994	"It Won't Go Away"	—	—	—	—	—	—	—	—	—	—		After the Storm
1994	"These Empty Days"	—	—	—	—	—	—	—	—	—	—		After the Storm
1999	"No Tears Left"	—	— (Note: "No Tears Left" reached number 34 on the Mainstream Rock chart)	—	—	—	—	—	—	—	—		Looking Forward
"—" denotes releases that did not chart.

== Guest singles ==
Year	Single	Artist	Chart positions	Album
Year	Single	Artist	US Country	Album
1994	"Teach Your Children"	The Red Hots	75	Red Hot + Country

== Videos ==
=== Video albums ===
Title	Album details	Peak chart positions	Certification
Title	Album details	NL	Certification
Daylight Again	Released: 1982; MCA Home Video	29	
The Acoustic Concert	Released: 1991; PBS Home Video	20	
Long Time Comin': A Musical and Visual Retrospective	Released: 2004; Rhino Home Video	—	
CSNY/Déjà Vu	Released: 2008	—	
Acoustic/Long Time Comin'/Daylight Again	Released: 2010 (Australia); Note: 3 DVD set	—	AUS: Gold
CSN 2012	Released: July 2, 2012; Label: CSN Records; Format: CD, DVD, Blu-ray, download	19	

=== Music videos ===
Year	Video
1982	"Wasted on the Way"
1982	"Southern Cross"
1983	"War Games"
1988	"American Dream"
1990	"Chippin' Away
1990	"Live It Up"
1990	"If Anybody Had a Heart"
1994	"Teach Your Children" (as The Red Hots)

== Other appearances ==
Year	Song	Album
2010	"Woodstock" (Crosby, Stills & Nash) "Almost Cut My Hair" (Crosby, Stills & Nash) "Love Has No Pride" (Crosby, Stills & Nash with Bonnie Raitt) "The Pretender" (Crosby, Stills & Nash with Jackson Browne) "Love the One You're With" (Crosby, Stills & Nash with James Taylor) "Here Comes the Sun" (Paul Simon with David Crosby and Graham Nash)	The 25th Anniversary Rock & Roll Hall of Fame Concerts
