= Greatest Hits (Crosby, Stills & Nash album) =

Compilation album by Crosby, Stills & Nash
- Released: March 15, 2005
- Recorded: June 26, 1968 – December 1, 1981
- Genre: Folk rock
- Length: 77:30
- Label: Rhino

Crosby, Stills & Nash chronology
Looking Forward (1999)	Greatest Hits (2005)	Déjà Vu Live (2008)

Professional ratings
Review scores
Source	Rating
Allmusic	4.5/5 stars
The Music Box	4/5 stars

Greatest Hits is a compilation album by Crosby, Stills & Nash, released by Rhino Records in 2005. It peaked at No. 24 on the Billboard 200, debuting at that position on April 2, 2005 with first week sales of 33,000 copies, and spending eight weeks on the chart. Its current sales sit at over 640,000. The album was dedicated to Cass Elliot with great thanks to Neil Young.

== Content ==
Although "Our House", "Teach Your Children", and "Carry On" are on the Crosby, Stills, Nash, and Young album Déjà Vu, Young was not involved in those songs, allowing Greatest Hits to authentically be considered specifically a "Crosby, Stills & Nash" collection, and as such does not contain any songs featuring Young. The selections derive from the group's first four studio albums (Crosby, Stills & Nash, Déjà Vu, CSN, Daylight Again), but nothing from their last four (American Dream, Live It Up, After the Storm, and Looking Forward).

== Track listing ==
No.	Title	Writer(s)	Length
1.	"Suite: Judy Blue Eyes" (from Crosby, Stills & Nash, 1969)	Stephen Stills	7:22
2.	"Long Time Gone" (from Crosby, Stills & Nash)	David Crosby	4:17
3.	"Just a Song Before I Go" (from CSN, 1977)	Graham Nash	2:12
4.	"Southern Cross" (from Daylight Again, 1982)	Stills, Richard Curtis, Michael Curtis	4:40
5.	"Marrakesh Express" (from Crosby, Stills & Nash)	Nash	2:36
6.	"Helplessly Hoping" (from Crosby, Stills & Nash)	Stills	2:37
7.	"Shadow Captain" (from CSN)	Crosby, Craig Doerge	4:32
8.	"Our House" (from Déjà Vu, 1970)	Nash	3:01
9.	"Guinnevere" (from Crosby, Stills & Nash)	Crosby	4:43
10.	"See the Changes" (from CSN)	Stills	2:56
11.	"Teach Your Children" (from Déjà Vu)	Nash	2:55
12.	"Wooden Ships" (from Crosby, Stills & Nash)	Crosby, Stills, Paul Kantner	5:22
13.	"Delta" (from Daylight Again)	Crosby	4:12
14.	"49 Bye-Byes" (from Crosby, Stills & Nash)	Stills	5:15
15.	"Wasted on the Way" (from Daylight Again)	Nash	2:51
16.	"Carry On/Questions" (from Déjà Vu)	Stills	4:25
17.	"In My Dreams" (from CSN)	Crosby	5:10
18.	"Cathedral" (from CSN)	Nash	5:15
19.	"Daylight Again" (from Daylight Again)	Stills	2:28

== Personnel ==
- David Crosby – vocals; rhythm guitar on "Wooden Ships" and "Long Time Gone"; acoustic guitar on "Just A Song Before I Go" and "Guinnevere"; keyboards on "Delta"
- Stephen Stills – vocals; guitars all tracks except "Guinnevere", "Delta" and "Cathedral"; bass on "Suite: Judy Blue Eyes", "Long Time Gone", "Marrakesh Express", "Teach Your Children", "Wooden Ships", "49 Bye-Byes" and "Carry On/Questions"; keyboards on "Suite: Judy Blue Eyes", "Long Time Gone", "Marrakesh Express", "Wooden Ships", "49 Bye-Byes" and "Carry On/Questions"; percussion on "Suite: Judy Blue Eyes" and "Carry On/Questions"; banjo on "Daylight Again"
- Graham Nash – vocals; rhythm guitar on "Marrakesh Express" and "Teach Your Children"; piano on "Just a Song Before I Go", "Our House" and "Cathedral"; percussion on "Carry On" and "Teach Your Children"

=== Additional personnel ===
- Timothy B. Schmit – vocals on "Southern Cross" and "Wasted on the Way"
- Art Garfunkel – vocals on "Southern Cross" and "Daylight Again"
- Michael Stergis – guitars on "Southern Cross" and "Wasted on the Way"
- Jerry Garcia – pedal steel guitar on "Teach Your Children"
- Dean Parks – electric guitar on "Delta"
- Joel Bernstein – acoustic guitar on "Wasted on the Way"
- Wayne Goodwin – fiddle on "Wasted on the Way"
- Joe Vitale – drums on "Southern Cross" and "Cathedral"; organ, flute on "Shadow Captain"; electric piano on "Just a Song Before I Go"; percussion, timpani on "Cathedral"
- Craig Doerge – keyboards on "Shadow Captain", "Delta" and "Wasted on the Way"
- Mike Finnigan – keyboards, backing vocals on "Southern Cross"
- Richard T. Bear – keyboards on "Southern Cross"
- George Perry– bass on "Southern Cross", "Shadow Captain" and "Cathedral"
- Tim Drummond – bass on "Just a Song Before I Go"
- Greg Reeves – bass on "Our House"
- Leland Sklar – bass on "Delta"
- Bob Glaub – bass on "Wasted on the Way"
- Dallas Taylor – drums on "Suite: Judy Blue Eyes", "Long Time Gone", "Our House", "Wooden Ships", "49 Bye-Byes" and "Carry On/Questions"; tambourine on "Teach Your Children"
- Russ Kunkel – drums on "Just a Song Before I Go", "Shadow Captain", "Delta" and "Wasted on the Way"; congas on "Shadow Captain"; percussion on "Just a Song Before I Go"
- Jim Gordon – drums on "Marrakesh Express"
- Joe Lala – percussion on "Southern Cross" and "Wasted on the Way"
- Mike Lewis, Joel Bernstein, David Crosby, Graham Nash – string arrangements on "Cathedral"

== Charts ==
Chart performance for Greatest Hits
Chart (2023)	Peak position
Hungarian Physical Albums (MAHASZ)	27
