= Carry On (Crosby, Stills, Nash & Young album) =

Compilation album by Crosby, Stills & Nash
- Released: December 2, 1991
- Recorded: 1968–1991
- Genre: Folk rock
- Label: Atlantic
- Producer: Graham Nash, Gerry Tolman

Crosby, Stills & Nash chronology
CSN (1991)	Carry On (1991)	After the Storm (1994)

Professional ratings
Review scores
Source	Rating
AllMusic	4/5 stars

Carry On is a compilation album by Crosby, Stills & Nash, issued on Atlantic Records in 1991, generally for the European and Australian markets. It is a two-disc sampler of their four-disc box set, CSN, released two months previously in the United States and the United Kingdom. It features material spanning 1968 through 1990 from their catalogue of recordings as a group in addition to selections from Crosby & Nash, Manassas, and their individual solo albums. It was reissued on 30 June 1998 on the WEA International record label. This compilation should not be confused with the Stephen Stills box set of the same name released in 2013.

== Content ==
Where the box set is a more comprehensive overview, this one focuses on previously unreleased tracks, hits, and favorites. Of its 36 tracks, 13 had been unreleased previously, and nine contain all of the group's Top 40 hits from the Billboard Hot 100. The group's some-time partner Neil Young appears on eight tracks, including his own songs "Helpless" and "Ohio". The previously unreleased material includes studio recordings by the full quartet of "Helplessly Hoping" (originally released by the trio), "Taken at All" (originally by Crosby & Nash), and "The Lee Shore" (previously available only live). The set also includes both the demo of "You Don't Have to Cry", the first recording they made as Crosby, Stills & Nash, and the three tracks from their most recent studio album as of 1991 that are also on the box set.

The original recordings were produced by David Crosby, Stephen Stills, Graham Nash, and Neil Young, with assistance from Howard Albert, Ron Albert, Stanley Johnston, and Paul Rothchild. Audio engineers on the original recordings include Stephen Barncard, Larry Cox, Russ Gary, Don Gooch, Steve Gursky, Bill Halverson, David Hassinger, Andy Johns, and Jim Mitchell. The original masters were recorded at the following studios: Devonshire Sound Studio, Wally Heider Studios, The Record Plant, Rudy Recorders, the Sound Lab, Sunset Sound, Sunwest Studio, and Village Recorders in Los Angeles; United Studio in Hollywood; The Record Plant in New York City; Wally Heider Studios, His Master's Wheels, and Rudy Recorders in San Francisco; Criteria Sound Studios in Miami; Island Studios in London; and Stephen Stills' late 1960s home in Laurel Canyon. The selections were compiled for this set by Crosby, Stills, Nash, Gerry Tolman, and Yves Beauvais, with additional research by Joel Bernstein.

== Track listing ==
An asterisk (*) indicates a live recording, two asterisks (**) a previously unreleased mix, (†) a previously unreleased version, and (‡) a previously unreleased song.

Disc one
No.	Title	Writer(s)	Artist; Recording date	Length
1.	"Woodstock"	Joni Mitchell	CSNY; November 5, 1969 **	3:50
2.	"Marrakesh Express" (from Crosby, Stills & Nash, 1969)	Graham Nash	CSN; early 1969	2:36
3.	"You Don't Have to Cry"	Stephen Stills	CSN; December 1968 †	2:40
4.	"Teach Your Children" (from Déjà Vu, 1970)	Graham Nash	CSN; October 24, 1969	2:52
5.	"Love the One You're With" (from Stephen Stills, 1970)	Stephen Stills	CSN; March 1970	3:03
6.	"Almost Cut My Hair"	David Crosby	CSNY; January 8, 1970 †	8:49
7.	"Wooden Ships" (from Crosby, Stills & Nash)	David Crosby, Paul Kantner, Stephen Stills	CSN; February 20, 1969	5:26
8.	"Dark Star" (from Allies, 1983)	Stephen Stills	CSN; December 5, 1982 *	4:57
9.	"Helpless" (from Déjà Vu)	Neil Young	CSNY; November 17, 1969	3:36
10.	"Chicago/We Can Change the World" (from Songs for Beginners, 1971)	Graham Nash	Nash; February 28, 1971	3:58
11.	"Cathedral" (from CSN, 1977)	Graham Nash	CSN; January 22, 1977	5:16
12.	"4+20"	Stephen Stills	Stills; July 16, 1969 **	2:10
13.	"Our House" (from Déjà Vu)	Graham Nash	CSN; November 5, 1969	2:58
14.	"To the Last Whale..." (from Wind on the Water, 1975)	David Crosby, Graham Nash	Crosby & Nash; May 11 & July 1, 1975	5:30
15.	"Change Partners" (from Stephen Stills 2, 1971)	Stephen Stills	Stills and Crosby; early 1971	3:13
16.	"Just a Song Before I Go" (from CSN)	Graham Nash	CSN; December 19, 1976	2:12
17.	"Ohio" (Non-album single, 1970)	Neil Young	CSNY; May 21, 1970	3:00
18.	"Wasted on the Way" (from Daylight Again, 1982)	Graham Nash	CSN; January 30, 1981	2:46
19.	"Southern Cross" (from Daylight Again)	Stephen Stills, Richard Curtis, Michael Curtis	CSN; late 1981	4:39

Disc two
No.	Title	Writer(s)	Artist; Recording date	Length
1.	"Suite: Judy Blue Eyes"	Stephen Stills	CSN; early 1969 **	7:28
2.	"Carry On/Questions" (from Déjà Vu)	Stephen Stills	CSN; December 28, 1969	4:25
3.	"Horses Through a Rainstorm"	Graham Nash, Terry Reid	CSNY; December 28, 1969 ‡	3:40
4.	"Johnny's Garden" (from Manassas, 1972)	Stephen Stills	Manassas; January 8, 1972	2:46
5.	"Guinnevere"	David Crosby	Crosby; June 26, 1968 †	4:45
6.	"Helplessly Hoping"	Stephen Stills	CSNY; June 15, 1969 †	2:31
7.	"The Lee Shore"	David Crosby	CSNY; December 28, 1969 †	5:28
8.	"Taken At All"	Graham Nash, David Crosby	CSNY; April 1, 1976 †	2:54
9.	"Shadow Captain" (from CSN)	David Crosby, Craig Doerge	CSN; January 14, 1977	4:31
10.	"As I Come of Age"	Stephen Stills	CSN; January 1981 †	2:48
11.	"Drive My Car"	David Crosby	Crosby; late 1978 †	3:50
12.	"Dear Mr. Fantasy"	Steve Winwood, Jim Capaldi, Chris Wood	Stills and Nash; November 17, 1980 ‡	7:04
13.	"In My Dreams" (from CSN)	David Crosby	CSN; January 12, 1977	5:11
14.	"Yours and Mine" (from Live It Up, 1990)	David Crosby	CSN; February 2, 1990	4:28
15.	"Haven't We Lost Enough?" (from Live It Up)	Stephen Stills, Kevin Cronin	CSN; April 3, 1990	3:06
16.	"After the Dolphin" (from Live It Up)	Graham Nash	CSN; February 1, 1989	4:25
17.	"Find the Cost of Freedom" (B-side of the "Ohio" single, 1970)	Stephen Stills	CSNY; May 21, 1970	1:59

== Personnel ==
- David Crosby – vocals, guitars, keyboards, string arrangements
- Stephen Stills – vocals, guitars, keyboards, bass guitar, percussion
- Graham Nash – vocals, guitars, keyboards, percussion, string arrangements
- Neil Young – vocals, guitars, harmonica, keyboards
- Joel Bernstein, Danny Kortchmar, Michael Landau, David Lindley, Michael Stergis, James Taylor – guitars
- Jerry Garcia – pedal steel guitar
- John Sebastian – harmonica, backing vocals
- Joe Vitale – drums, percussion, keyboards, synthesizers, vibraphone, flute
- Richard T. Bear, Joel Bernstein, Craig Doerge, Mike Finnigan, Paul Harris, James Newton Howard – keyboards
- Jack Casady, Tim Drummond, Bob Glaub, Bruce Palmer, George "Chocolate" Perry, Greg Reeves, Calvin "Fuzzy" Samuels, Leland Sklar – bass guitar
- John Barbata, Russ Kunkel, Dallas Taylor – drums
- Michael Fisher, Joe Lala, Efrain Toro, Jeff Whittaker – percussion
- Joel Bernstein, Rita Coolidge, Venetta Fields, Priscilla Jones, Clydie King, Sherlie Matthews, Dorothy Morrison, Timothy B. Schmit – backing vocals
- Cyrus Faryar – bouzouki
- Wayne Goodwin – fiddle
- Branford Marsalis – soprano saxophone
- Jimmie Haskell, Mike Lewis, Sid Sharp – string arrangements
- Tony Beard – drum programming

=== Production personnel ===
- Graham Nash, Gerry Tolman – producers
- Stephen Barncard at Sunset Sound – 1991 mixes for unreleased material
- Joe Gastwirt, John Modells at Ocean View Digital – digital remastering, July and August 1991
- Joe Gastwirt at Ocean View Digital and John Nowland at Redwood Digital, San Francisco – analog-to-digital tape transfer, June and July 1991
- Joe Gastwirt, John Nowland, Joel Bernstein – tape restoration

== Certifications ==
Region	Certification	Certified units/sales
Australia (ARIA)	Platinum	70,000^{^}
^{^} Shipments figures based on certification alone.
