= So Far (Crosby, Stills, Nash & Young album) =

1974 compilation album

Compilation album by Crosby, Stills, Nash & Young
- Released: August 19, 1974
- Recorded: 1968–1970
- Genre: Folk rock
- Length: 42:36
- Label: Atlantic

Crosby, Stills, Nash & Young chronology
4 Way Street (1971)	So Far (1974)	CSN (1977)

Professional ratings
Review scores
Source	Rating
AllMusic	4.5/5 stars
Christgau's Record Guide	B−
Tom Hull	C−

So Far is a 1974 compilation album by Crosby, Stills, Nash & Young. Shipping as a gold record and peaking at No. 1 on the Billboard Top Pop Albums chart, it was the band's third chart-topping album in a row. It has been certified six times platinum by the RIAA, and is the second best-selling album by any configuration of the quartet in tandem after their 1970 studio album, Déjà Vu.

== Content ==
The album contains five of the band's six singles released by that point (omitting "Marrakesh Express"), all of which had reached the Top 40. It is the first release on long-playing album of the single "Ohio" as well as its B-side "Find the Cost of Freedom", and the only place both can be found on one compact disc. (Note: "Ohio" and "Find the Cost of Freedom" can also be found on separate discs of the box set CSN.) The other five tracks were taken from the band's two studio albums, Crosby, Stills & Nash and Déjà Vu, although the other singles appear here in their album-length versions and mixes.

The album had 11 studio tracks, by a group that had only issued 22 to date. Graham Nash later insisted that the group was against the album's release, calling the concoction of a greatest-hits album from two LPs and one non-LP single "absurd". Atlantic Records wished to capitalize on the highly publicized and anticipated reunion tour of Crosby, Stills, Nash & Young in 1974, however, and such was the demand for any new product by the quartet that So Far topped the charts anyway and went gold immediately.

Young appears on only four of the album's songs: "Ohio", "Find the Cost of Freedom", "Woodstock", and "Helpless". He had only appeared on half the tracks of Déjà Vu; three of the five remaining songs also appear on Crosby, Stills & Nash's Greatest Hits compact disc of 2005.

The cover art was painted by the group's friend and colleague Joni Mitchell. The album was reissued on compact disc in 1988 and again in 1995 after being remastered by Joe Gastwirt at Ocean View Digital using the original master tapes. It was reissued yet again, with no apparent additional remastering, on September 30, 2008. The album has been rendered relatively superfluous with the appearance of the Crosby, Stills & Nash box set in 1991, which contains all of these tracks with the exception of "Helplessly Hoping", "Woodstock", "Guinnevere", and "Suite: Judy Blue Eyes", which are in either different versions or different mixes.

== Track listing ==
Side one
No.	Title	Writer(s)	Source	Length
1.	"Déjà Vu (CSNY)"	David Crosby	Déjà Vu, 1970	4:10
2.	"Helplessly Hoping (CSN)"	Stephen Stills	Crosby, Stills & Nash, 1969	2:38
3.	"Wooden Ships (CSN)"	David Crosby, Stephen Stills, Paul Kantner	Crosby, Stills & Nash	5:26
4.	"Teach Your Children (CSNY)"	Graham Nash	Déjà Vu	2:53
5.	"Ohio (CSNY)"	Neil Young	Non-album single, 1970	3:00
6.	"Find the Cost of Freedom (CSNY)"	Stephen Stills	B-side of the "Ohio" single	2:01

Side two
No.	Title	Writer(s)	Source	Length
1.	"Woodstock (CSNY)"	Joni Mitchell	Déjà Vu	3:52
2.	"Our House (CSNY)"	Graham Nash	Déjà Vu	2:58
3.	"Helpless (CSNY)"	Neil Young	Déjà Vu	3:34
4.	"Guinnevere (CSN)"	David Crosby	Crosby, Stills & Nash	4:38
5.	"Suite: Judy Blue Eyes (CSN)"	Stephen Stills	Crosby, Stills & Nash	7:24

== Personnel ==
- David Crosby – vocals all tracks; rhythm guitar on "Déjà Vu", "Wooden Ships", "Ohio", and "Woodstock"; acoustic guitar on "Guinnevere"
- Stephen Stills – vocals all tracks except "Guinnevere"; acoustic and electric guitars all tracks except "Our House" and "Guinnevere"; piano on "Déjà Vu" and "Helpless"; organ on "Wooden Ships", "Woodstock", and "Suite: Judy Blue Eyes"; bass on "Déjà Vu", "Wooden Ships", "Teach Your Children", and "Suite: Judy Blue Eyes"
- Graham Nash – vocals all tracks; piano on "Woodstock" and "Our House"; acoustic guitar, tambourine on "Teach Your Children"; harpsichord on "Our House"
- Neil Young – vocals on "Ohio", "Find the Cost of Freedom", and "Helpless"; acoustic guitar on "Find the Cost of Freedom" and "Helpless"; electric guitar on "Ohio" and "Woodstock"

Additional personnel

- Greg Reeves – bass on "Woodstock", "Our House", and "Helpless"
- Calvin "Fuzzy" Samuels – bass on "Ohio"
- Dallas Taylor – drums on "Déjà Vu", "Wooden Ships", "Woodstock", "Our House", "Helpless", and "Suite: Judy Blue Eyes"; tambourine on "Teach Your Children"
- Johnny Barbata – drums on "Ohio"
- John Sebastian – harmonica on "Déjà Vu"
- Jerry Garcia – pedal steel guitar on "Teach Your Children"

== Charts ==
Chart performance for So Far
Chart (1974)	Peak position
Canadian RPM 100 Albums	1
UK Albums Chart	25
Australian Album Charts	77
US Top LPs & Tape (Billboard)	1
US Cash Box Top 100 Albums	1
US Record World Album Chart	2

Year End Album Charts

Chart (1974)	Rank
Canada Album Charts	16
US Cashbox Album Charts	50

== Certification ==
Region	Certification	Certified units/sales
Canada (Music Canada)	Gold	50,000^{^}
United States (RIAA)	6× Platinum	6,000,000^{^}
^{^} Shipments figures based on certification alone.
