= Live at Fillmore East, 1969 =

Live album by Crosby, Stills, Nash & Young
- Released: October 25, 2024
- Recorded: September 20, 1969
- Venue: Fillmore East
- Genre: Folk rock
- Length: 77:19
- Label: Rhino Entertainment

Crosby, Stills, Nash & Young chronology
CSNY 1974 (2014)	Live at Fillmore East, 1969 (2024)

Singles from Live at Fillmore East, 1969
- 1. "Helplessly Hoping (Live at Fillmore East, 1969) [2024 Mix]" Released: September 10, 2024

Live at Fillmore East, 1969 is a live album by the folk rock supergroup Crosby, Stills, Nash & Young. It was released on October 25, 2024, by Rhino Entertainment. All 4 members of the group were involved in the album's assembly. On the album's assembly, Graham Nash stated: "Hearing the music again after all these years, I can tell how much we loved each other and loved the music that we were creating. We were four people reveling in the different sounds we were producing, quietly singing together on the one hand, then rocking like fuck for the rest of the concert."

Professional ratings
Aggregate scores
Source	Rating
Metacritic	91/100
Review scores
Source	Rating
AllMusic	4/5 stars
Classic Rock	4/5 stars
Mojo	4/5 stars
Uncut	10/10
Under the Radar	9/10 stars

== Track listing ==
Acoustic set
No.	Title	Length
1.	"Suite: Judy Blue Eyes"	8:42
2.	"Blackbird" (written by Paul McCartney, originally included on The Beatles)	2:30
3.	"Helplessly Hoping"	2:46
4.	"Guinnevere"	5:33
5.	"Lady of the Island"	2:50
6.	"Go Back Home" (originally included on Stephen Stills)	4:08
7.	"On the Way Home" (originally included on Last Time Around)	3:11
8.	"4 + 20"	2:29
9.	"Our House"	3:07
10.	"I've Loved Her So Long"	2:54
11.	"You Don't Have to Cry"	3:02

Electric set
No.	Title	Length
12.	"Long Time Gone"	5:18
13.	"Wooden Ships"	5:25
14.	"Bluebird Revisited" (originally included on Stephen Stills 2)	3:38
15.	"Sea of Madness"	3:33
16.	"Down by the River" (originally included on Everybody Knows This Is Nowhere)	16:19
17.	"Find the Cost of Freedom"	1:55
Total length:		77:19

== Charts ==
Chart performance for Live at Fillmore East, 1969
Chart (2024)	Peak position
Austrian Albums (Ö3 Austria)	43
Belgian Albums (Ultratop Flanders)	110
Belgian Albums (Ultratop Wallonia)	95
Dutch Albums (Album Top 100)	52
French Albums (SNEP)	109
German Albums (Offizielle Top 100)	25
Italian Albums (FIMI)	71
Scottish Albums (Official Charts)	20
Spanish Albums (Promusicae)	80
Swiss Albums (Schweizer Hitparade)	31
US Billboard 200	134
