= CSN (box set) =

Box set by Crosby, Stills & Nash
- Released: September 30, 1991
- Recorded: June 26, 1968 – April 3, 1990
- Genre: Rock
- Length: 297:19
- Label: Atlantic
- Producers: Graham Nash, Gerry Tolman

Crosby, Stills & Nash chronology
Live It Up (1990)	CSN (1991)	Carry On (1991)

Professional ratings
Review scores
Source	Rating
AllMusic	4.5/5 stars

CSN is a box set by Crosby, Stills & Nash, issued on Atlantic Records in 1991. It features material spanning from 1968 through 1990 from their catalogue of recordings as a group in addition to selections from Crosby & Nash, Manassas, and their individual solo albums. It peaked at No. 109 on the Billboard 200, and has been certified platinum by the RIAA. The set is "dedicated to the loving memory of Cass Elliot, without whom most of this music may not have been made." A two-disc distillation of the box was released for other markets later in the year.

== Content ==
The presence of the group's occasional fourth member, Neil Young, is limited to 14 tracks and only two of his compositions for the band, "Helpless" and "Ohio". Of its 77 tracks, 25 had been unreleased previously, although many were alternate takes, alternate mixes, or concert versions of previously issued songs. Included in the unreleased tracks are a CSNY rehearsal of "Helplessly Hoping" prior to their first tour, two outtakes from the Déjà Vu sessions "Horses through a Rainstorm" and "The Lee Shore", and the December 1968 demo of "You Don't Have to Cry", the first recording they made as Crosby, Stills & Nash. Other highlights include a cover of The Beatles' "Blackbird", the full-length take of "Almost Cut My Hair", and three tracks respectively from the aborted CSNY second studio album sessions of 1973, 1974, and 1976: "See the Changes"; "Homeward through the Haze"; and "Taken at All".

No tracks are taken from the following studio albums released either individually or in combination during the time period covered by the box: Down the Road; Illegal Stills; Whistling Down the Wire; Long May You Run; Innocent Eyes; and American Dream. (Note: However, alternate versions of tracks from these albums do appear: "Got It Made" and "Soldiers of Peace" from American Dream, as well as the quartet version of "Taken at All" from Whistling Down the Wire.) The orphan single by Young and Nash, "War Song", is also not included and is only available on the Neil Young archives box.

The original recordings were produced by David Crosby, Stephen Stills, Graham Nash, and Neil Young, with assistance from Howard Albert, Ron Albert, Craig Doerge, Bill Halverson, Chris Hillman, Stanley Johnston, Paul Rothchild, Dallas Taylor, and Joe Vitale. Audio engineers on the original recordings include Stephen Barncard, Niko Bolas, Ellen Burke, Larry Cox, Russ Gary, Don Gooch, Steve Gursky, David Hassinger, Andy Johns, Glyn Johns, Gary Kellgren, Henry Lewy, Elliot Mazer, Jim Mitchell, Tim Mulligan, and Doc Storch. The original masters were recorded at the following studios: A&M Studios, Britannia Studios, Devonshire Sound Studio, Wally Heider Studios, The Record Plant, Rudy Recorders, the Sound Lab, Sunset Sound, Sunwest Studio, Village Recorders, and Westlake Audio in Los Angeles; United Studio in Hollywood; The Record Plant in New York City; Wally Heider Studios, His Master's Wheels, and Rudy Recorders in San Francisco; The Record Plant in Sausalito; Criteria Sound Studios in Miami; Island Studios in London; Sol Studio in Maidstone, Kent; Stephen Stills' late 1960s home in Laurel Canyon, Graham Nash's early 1970s home in San Francisco, and Neil Young's Redwood Digital home studio at his ranch in Woodside, California. Live recordings are from the Filmore East in New York in 1970, the Universal Amphitheatre in Los Angeles in 1979, the Arlene Schnitzer Concert Hall in Portland, Oregon in 1982, and the United Nations General Assembly Hall in New York in 1989.

The selections were compiled for this set by Crosby, Stills, Nash, Gerry Tolman, and Yves Beauvais, with additional research by Joel Bernstein. The liner notes include an essay by writer Chet Flippo. Originally in a box set conforming to the size dimensions of a vinyl record, the set was reissued as a compact disc brick on August 13, 2013. The liner notes for the 2013 reissue do not indicate whether or not any additional mastering beyond that from 1991 was undertaken.

== Track listing ==
An asterisk (*) indicates a live recording, two asterisks (**) a previously unreleased mix, (†) a previously unreleased version, and (‡) a previously unreleased song.

Disc one
No.	Title	Writer(s)	Recording date	Length
1.	"Suite: Judy Blue Eyes" (deleted drum track restored, alternate vocals; original mix on Crosby, Stills & Nash)	Stephen Stills	early 1969 **	7:28
2.	"Helplessly Hoping" (CSNY rehearsal)	Stephen Stills	June 15, 1969 †	2:31
3.	"You Don't Have to Cry" (first CSN recording)	Stephen Stills	December 1968 †	2:40
4.	"Wooden Ships" (from Crosby, Stills & Nash)	David Crosby, Paul Kantner, Stephen Stills	February 20, 1969	5:26
5.	"Guinnevere" (Crosby demo)	David Crosby	June 26, 1968 †	4:45
6.	"Marrakesh Express" (from Crosby, Stills & Nash)	Graham Nash	early 1969	2:36
7.	"Long Time Gone" (from Crosby, Stills & Nash)	David Crosby	early 1969	4:17
8.	"Blackbird" (Crosby, Stills & Nash outtake)	John Lennon, Paul McCartney	February 11, 1969 ‡	2:33
9.	"Lady of the Island" (from Crosby, Stills & Nash)	Graham Nash	February 11, 1969	2:36
10.	"Song With No Words (Tree With No Leaves)" (Crosby & Nash early version)	David Crosby	November 17, 1969 †	3:14
11.	"Almost Cut My Hair" (unedited take of track on Déjà Vu)	David Crosby	January 8, 1970 †	8:49
12.	"Teach Your Children" (from Déjà Vu)	Graham Nash	October 24, 1969	2:52
13.	"Horses Through a Rainstorm" (Déjà Vu outtake)	Graham Nash, Terry Reid	December 28, 1969 ‡	3:40
14.	"Déjà Vu" (from Déjà Vu)	David Crosby	November 17, 1969	4:10
15.	"Helpless" (from Déjà Vu)	Neil Young	November 17, 1969	3:36
16.	"4+20" (original mix on Déjà Vu)	Stephen Stills	July 16, 1969 **	2:10
17.	"Laughing" (from If I Could Only Remember My Name)	David Crosby	October 24, 1969	5:24
18.	"Carry On/Questions" (from Déjà Vu)	Stephen Stills	December 28, 1969	4:25

Disc two
No.	Title	Writer(s)	Recording date	Length
1.	"Woodstock" (original mix on Déjà Vu)	Joni Mitchell	November 5, 1969 **	3:50
2.	"Ohio" (1970 single)	Neil Young	May 21, 1970	3:00
3.	"Love the One You're With" (from Stephen Stills)	Stephen Stills	March 1970	3:03
4.	"Our House" (from Déjà Vu)	Graham Nash	November 5, 1969	2:58
5.	"Old Times Good Times" (from Stephen Stills)	Stephen Stills	early 1970	3:38
6.	"The Lee Shore" (Déjà Vu outtake with 1991 vocal overdubs)	David Crosby	December 28, 1969 †	5:28
7.	"Music Is Love" (from If I Could Only Remember My Name)	David Crosby	autumn 1970	3:18
8.	"I'd Swear There Was Somebody Here" (from If I Could Only Remember My Name)	David Crosby	autumn 1970	1:19
9.	"Man in the Mirror" (CNY version)	Graham Nash	June 7, 1970 †*	2:52
10.	"Black Queen" (Stills solo)	Stephen Stills	June 7, 1970 †*	6:50
11.	"Military Madness" (from Songs for Beginners)	Graham Nash	February 12, 1971	2:55
12.	"Urge for Going" (intended as 1971 Crosby & Nash single)	Joni Mitchell	June 22, 1971 ‡	3:46
13.	"I Used to Be a King" (from Songs for Beginners)	Graham Nash	January 9, 1971	4:48
14.	"Simple Man" (original mix on Songs for Beginners)	Graham Nash	July 24, 1970 **	2:19
15.	"Southbound Train" (from Graham Nash David Crosby)	Graham Nash	January 6, 1972	3:54
16.	"Change Partners" (from Stephen Stills 2)	Stephen Stills	early 1971	3:13
17.	"My Love Is a Gentle Thing" (Stills solo)	Stephen Stills	April 18, 1975 ‡	1:23
18.	"Word Game" (from Stephen Stills 2)	Stephen Stills	early 1971	4:10
19.	"Johnny's Garden" (from Manassas)	Stephen Stills	January 8, 1972	2:46
20.	"So Begins the Task" (from Manassas)	Stephen Stills	January 9, 1972	4:00
21.	"Turn Back the Pages" (from Stills)	Stephen Stills, Donnie Dacus	early 1975	4:05

Disc three
No.	Title	Writer(s)	Recording date	Length
1.	"See the Changes" (CSNY version)	Stephen Stills	June 28, 1973 †	2:44
2.	"It Doesn't Matter" (from Manassas)	Stephen Stills, Chris Hillman	January 7, 1972	2:31
3.	"Immigration Man" (from Graham Nash David Crosby)	Graham Nash	February 9, 1972	2:58
4.	"Chicago/We Can Change the World" (from Songs for Beginners)	Graham Nash	February 28, 1971	3:58
5.	"Homeward Through the Haze" (CSNY version)	David Crosby	December 16, 1974 †	4:20
6.	"Where Will I Be?" (from Graham Nash David Crosby)	David Crosby	November 22, 1971	3:22
7.	"Page 43" (from Graham Nash David Crosby)	David Crosby	December 13, 1971	2:55
8.	"Carry Me" (from Wind on the Water)	David Crosby	March, 1975	3:33
9.	"Cowboy of Dreams" (from Wind on the Water)	Graham Nash	June 18, 1975	3:27
10.	"Bittersweet" (from Wind on the Water)	David Crosby	June 8, 1975	2:37
11.	"To the Last Whale..." (from Wind on the Water)	David Crosby, Graham Nash	May 11, July 1, 1975	5:30
12.	"Prison Song" (from Wild Tales)	Graham Nash	spring 1973	3:11
13.	"Another Sleep Song" (from Wild Tales)	Graham Nash	August 18, 1972	4:42
14.	"Taken at All" (CSNY version)	Graham Nash, David Crosby	April 1, 1976 †	2:54
15.	"In My Dreams" (from CSN)	David Crosby	January 12, 1977	5:11
16.	"Just a Song Before I Go" (from CSN)	Graham Nash	December 19, 1976	2:12
17.	"Shadow Captain" (from CSN)	David Crosby, Craig Doerge	January 14, 1977	4:31
18.	"Dark Star" (from Allies)	Stephen Stills	December 5, 1982 *	4:57
19.	"Cathedral" (from CSN)	Graham Nash	January 22, 1977	5:16

Disc four
No.	Title	Writer(s)	Recording date	Length
1.	"Wasted on the Way" (from Daylight Again)	Graham Nash	January 30, 1981	2:46
2.	"Barrel of Pain (Half-Life)" (from Earth & Sky)	Graham Nash	April 4, 1979	4:44
3.	"Southern Cross" (from Daylight Again)	Stephen Stills, Richard Curtis, Michael Curtis	late 1981	4:39
4.	"Daylight Again" (from Daylight Again)	Stephen Stills	late 1981	2:28
5.	"Thoroughfare Gap" (from Thoroughfare Gap)	Stephen Stills	early 1978	3:33
6.	"Wild Tales" (Nash solo)	Graham Nash	August 3, 1979 †*	3:09
7.	"Dear Mr. Fantasy" (Stills & Nash version)	Steve Winwood, Jim Capaldi, Chris Wood	November 17, 1980 ‡	7:04
8.	"Cold Rain" (from CSN)	Graham Nash	January 25, 1977	2:33
9.	"Got It Made" (Stills & Nash version)	Stephen Stills, Neil Young	November 18, 1989 †*	4:33
10.	"Tracks in the Dust" (from Oh Yes I Can)	David Crosby	January 23, 1989	4:48
11.	"As I Come of Age" (CSN remake of track on Stills)	Stephen Stills	January 1981 †	2:48
12.	"50/50" (from Right by You)	Stephen Stills, Joe Lala	early 1983	4:20
13.	"Drive My Car" (early version of track on Oh Yes I Can)	David Crosby	late 1978 †	3:50
14.	"Delta" (from Daylight Again)	David Crosby	May 1980	4:11
15.	"Soldiers of Peace" (original on American Dream)	Graham Nash, Craig Doerge, Joe Vitale	late 1988 †	4:20
16.	"Yours and Mine" (from Live It Up)	David Crosby, Graham Nash, Craig Doerge	February 2, 1990	4:28
17.	"Haven't We Lost Enough?" (from Live It Up)	Stephen Stills, Kevin Cronin	April 3, 1990	3:06
18.	"After the Dolphin" (from Live It Up)	Graham Nash	February 1, 1989	4:25
19.	"Find the Cost of Freedom" (B-side of the "Ohio" single)	Stephen Stills	May 21, 1970	1:59

== Collective personnel ==
- David Crosby — vocals, guitars, keyboards, string arrangements
- Stephen Stills — vocals, guitars, keyboards, bass, banjo, percussion, vibraphone
- Graham Nash — vocals, guitars, keyboards, harmonica, percussion, string arrangements
- Neil Young — vocals, guitars, harmonica, bass, keyboards, vibraphone
- Joel Bernstein, Donnie Dacus, Michael Hedges, Jimi Hendrix, Danny Kortchmar, Michael Landau, Dave Mason, Jimmy Page, Dean Parks, Michael Stergis — guitars
- Chris Hillman, James Taylor — guitars, backing vocals
- Jerry Garcia, Ben Keith, Al Perkins — pedal steel guitar
- Joe Vitale — drums, percussion, keyboards, synthesizers, vibraphone, flute
- David Lindley — fiddle, guitar, mandolin
- Richard T. Bear, Joel Bernstein, Lawrence Dermer, Craig Doerge, Mike Finnigan, Paul Harris, James Newton Howard, Carole King — keyboards
- Jack Casady, Tim Drummond, Chris Ethridge, Bob Glaub, Phil Lesh, Bruce Palmer, George Perry, Greg Reeves, Calvin "Fuzzy" Samuels, Leland Sklar — bass
- John Barbata, Jim Gordon, Conrad Isidore, Bill Kreutzmann, Russ Kunkel, Paul Lee, Dallas Taylor, Tubby Ziegler — drums
- John Barbata, Michael Fisher, Joe Galdo, Joe Lala, Efrain Toro, Jeff Whittaker — percussion
- Rita Coolidge — backing vocals, vibraphone
- John Sebastian — harmonica, backing vocals
- Patricia Arnold, Joel Bernstein, Gloria Coleman, Henry Diltz, Brenda Lee Eager, Venetta Fields, Art Garfunkel, Priscilla Jones, Cleo Kennedy, Clydie King, Marcy Levy, Sherlie Matthews, Joni Mitchell, Dorothy Morrison, Fred Neil, John Sambataro, Timothy B. Schmit — backing vocals
- Cyrus Faryar — bouzouki
- Dorian Rudnytsky — cello
- Wayne Goodwin, Al Gould — fiddle
- Dana Africa — flute
- Branford Marsalis — soprano saxophone
- George Cricker — trombone
- Tony Concepcion, Al Degooyer — trumpet
- Jimmie Haskell, Mike Lewis, Sid Sharp — string arrangements
- Tony Beard — drum programming

=== Production personnel ===
- Graham Nash, Gerry Tolman — producers
- Stephen Barncard at Sunset Sound — 1991 mixes for unreleased material
- Joe Gastwirt, John Modell at Ocean View Digital — digital remastering, July and August 1991
- Joe Gastwirt at Ocean View Digital and John Nowland at Redwood Digital, San Francisco — analog-to-digital tape transfer, June and July 1991
- Joe Gastwirt, John Nowland, Joel Bernstein — tape restoration
