= 4 Way Street =

Live album by Crosby, Stills, Nash & Young
- Released: April 7, 1971
- Recorded: Fillmore East, New York City (June 2–7, 1970); The Forum, Los Angeles (June 26–28, 1970); Auditorium Theatre, Chicago (July 5, 1970)
- Genres: Rock; folk rock
- Length: 85:59 109:44 (w. bonus tracks)
- Label: Atlantic
- Producer: Crosby, Stills, Nash & Young

Crosby, Stills, Nash & Young chronology
Déjà Vu (1970)	4 Way Street (1971)	So Far (1974)

Professional ratings
Review scores
Source	Rating
Allmusic	4.5/5 stars
Christgau's Record Guide	B−

4 Way Street is a live album by Crosby, Stills, Nash & Young, released in 1971 by Atlantic Records. It was the second album as Crosby, Stills, Nash & Young, after Déjà Vu in 1970. An earlier version of the band, with just Crosby, Stills, and Nash, had released the self-titled Crosby, Stills & Nash in 1969. The live recordings were taken from shows on the band's 1970 tour, with performances at the Fillmore East (New York City) on June 2 through June 7, 1970; The Forum (Los Angeles, California) on June 26 through June 28, 1970; and the Auditorium Theatre (Chicago, Illinois) on July 5, 1970.

Tensions between the band members were high during the tour, with their dressing-room fights becoming the stuff of rock legend, being referenced by Frank Zappa and the Mothers of Invention on their 1971 LP Fillmore East - June 1971. The tensions led to CSNY temporarily dissolving shortly after the recording of 4 Way Street. The album reached No. 1 on the Billboard 200, and was awarded a gold record.

== Content ==
The first release of the double album came packaged in a gatefold sleeve without a track listing. On the gatefold was a black-and-white picture of the band sitting on a bench, with the heads of Graham Nash and David Crosby framed by a wire clothes hanger hanging in front of them, with recording information and credits in the lower-right-hand corner. The only track listings appear on the album's labels and on the fold-out poster that also included full lyrics.

At the time of these concerts in mid-1970, many songs included on the eventual album had yet to be released as part of the combined and individual work of the four principals. Crosby's "The Lee Shore" had been recorded during the sessions for Déjà Vu but would not appear until the band's 1991 box set, and his controversial ménage à trois composition "Triad," which had been recorded but not released by his former band The Byrds, had been recorded by Jefferson Airplane on their Crown of Creation album but this is the first issued performance by Crosby himself. "Love the One You're With" would be the hit single taken from Stephen Stills, Stills's debut solo album, released later that year. "Chicago" by Nash would appear on his Songs for Beginners released in 1971, the same year as 4 Way Street, while "Right Between the Eyes" would later appear as a demo on his box set Reflections. "Don't Let It Bring You Down" and "Southern Man" by Young would be released on After the Gold Rush, his third album also released later that year. Young's "On the Way Home" had appeared on the final Buffalo Springfield album, Last Time Around, but with a lead vocal by Richie Furay rather than Young. Stills' "49 Bye-Byes/America's Children" medley interpolates the only top ten hit by Buffalo Springfield, his song "For What It's Worth." The band did include both sides of what was at the time of the shows their new record, the single "Ohio" and its B-side "Find the Cost of Freedom."

Sides one and two are acoustic, and demonstrate the band as a group of individuals; while sides three and four have the full band playing electric guitars. On sides one and two, and on the 1992 bonus tracks, Crosby, Stills, Nash and Young all performed solo, while Crosby & Nash, performing as a pair, previewed their later partnership with "The Lee Shore" and "Right Between the Eyes".

On April 13, 2019, for Record Store Day, Atlantic Records released a three-LP version of the 1992 Expanded Edition. It was mastered by Chris Bellman and pressed on 180-gram vinyl. Sides 1, 2, 3 and 4 contained the original track listing of the 1971 version, while the additional tracks "King Midas In Reverse", "Laughing", and "Black Queen" were pressed on Side 5, and "The Loner/Cinnamon Girl/Down By The River" were pressed on Side 6.

== Reception ==
The album reached number one on the Billboard 200 upon its release and also garnered a positive review in Rolling Stone, in which critic George Edward Kimball called it "their best album to date." Other contemporary reviews have also been positive.

Nash produced an expanded form of 4 Way Street for compact disc, released on June 15, 1992. The expanded edition included four solo performances on acoustic guitars, one by each member. Neil Young performed a medley of three songs from his first two solo albums; Stephen Stills included the at-the-time unreleased "Black Queen" from his eponymous debut; Crosby contributed his also yet to be issued "Laughing" from his 1971 debut LP; and Nash performed "King Midas in Reverse," The Hollies' single from 1967, which although credited to Allan Clarke, Nash and Tony Hicks, was written solely by Nash.

Additional tracks from the tour appeared on the CSN box set released in 1991, as well as Young's The Archives Vol. 1 1963–1972 released in 2009.

== Track listing ==
Bonus tracks for 1992 compact disc reissue appear appended to disc one after sides one and two. Disc two contains sides three and four.

Disc one: 42:58, 66:43 with bonus tracks

Side one
No.	Title	Writer(s)	Length
1.	"Suite: Judy Blue Eyes (coda)"	Stephen Stills	0:33
2.	"On the Way Home"	Neil Young	3:47
3.	"Teach Your Children"	Graham Nash	3:02
4.	"Triad"	David Crosby	6:54
5.	"The Lee Shore"	David Crosby	4:28
6.	"Chicago"	Graham Nash	3:10
Total length:			21:54

Side two
No.	Title	Writer(s)	Length
1.	"Right Between the Eyes"	Graham Nash	3:36
2.	"Cowgirl in the Sand"	Neil Young	3:58
3.	"Don't Let It Bring You Down"	Neil Young	3:30
4.	"49 Bye-Byes/America's Children"	Stephen Stills	6:35
5.	"Love the One You're With"	Stephen Stills	3:25
Total length:			21:04

1992 bonus track listing
No.	Title	Writer(s)	Length
12.	"King Midas In Reverse"	Graham Nash, Allan Clarke, Tony Hicks	3:43
13.	"Laughing"	David Crosby	3:36
14.	"Black Queen"	Stephen Stills	6:45
15.	"Medley: The Loner/Cinnamon Girl/Down by the River"	Neil Young	9:41
Total length:			23:45

Disc two: 43:01

Side three
No.	Title	Writer(s)	Length
1.	"Pre-Road Downs"	Graham Nash	3:04
2.	"Long Time Gone"	David Crosby	5:58
3.	"Southern Man"	Neil Young	13:45
Total length:			22:47

Side four
No.	Title	Writer(s)	Length
1.	"Ohio"	Neil Young	3:34
2.	"Carry On"	Stephen Stills	14:19
3.	"Find the Cost of Freedom"	Stephen Stills	2:21
Total length:			20:14

== Personnel ==
Musicians

- David Crosby – vocals, guitar
- Stephen Stills – vocals, guitar, piano, organ
- Graham Nash – vocals, guitar, piano, organ
- Neil Young – vocals, guitar
- Calvin "Fuzzy" Samuels – bass
- Johnny Barbata – drums

Production

- Crosby, Stills, Nash & Young – producers
- Bill Halverson – engineer
- Gary Burden – art direction/design, photography all others
- Joel Bernstein – photography center squares
- Henry Diltz – inside sleeve photography
- Joe Gastwirt – digital remastering
- Elliot Roberts and associates — management
- David Geffen — direction

== Charts ==
Chart performance for 4 Way Street
Chart (1971)	Peak position
US Billboard Top LPs	1
UK Album Charts	5
Canadian RPM 100 Albums	2
French Album Charts	4
Danish Hitlisten Charts	10
Norwegian VG-lista Albums	8
Swedish Kvällstoppen Chart	13
Australian Go-Set Top 20 Albums	6
Dutch MegaCharts Albums	3
Italian Album Charts	11
Spanish Album Charts	3
Japan Oricon Album Charts	19
US Cash Box Top 100 Albums	2
US Record World Album Chart	1

=== Year-end charts ===
Chart (1971)	Position
Dutch Albums Chart	37
Italian Album Charts	49
US Billboard Year-End	23
US Cashbox Year-End	15

== Certifications ==
Region	Certification	Certified units/sales
France (SNEP)	Gold	100,000^{*}
Germany (BVMI)	Gold	250,000^{^}
United States (RIAA)	4× Platinum	4,000,000^{^}
^{*} Sales figures based on certification alone.^{^} Shipments figures based on certification alone.
