= After the Storm (Crosby, Stills & Nash album) =

Studio album by Crosby, Stills & Nash
- Released: August 16, 1994
- Recorded: January 27 – July 1, 1994
- Genre: Rock
- Length: 45:56
- Label: Atlantic
- Producer: Glyn Johns

Crosby, Stills & Nash chronology
Carry On (1991)	After the Storm (1994)	Looking Forward (1999)

After the Storm is the seventh studio album by Crosby, Stills & Nash, and their fifth studio album in the trio configuration, released on Atlantic Records in 1994. It would be their last release on Atlantic for almost two decades. It peaked at No. 98 on the Billboard 200, the lowest charting position of their eight studio albums. It is also their lowest selling album, with sales near 200,000.

== Background and recording ==
CSN toured extensively in the early 1990s, playing over 200 shows from 1990 through 1992, but took a break in 1993. In the interim since the group's previous album, 1990's Live It Up, Stills and Crosby had both issued solo albums, Stills Alone in 1991 and Crosby's Thousand Roads in 1993, while Nash had compiled the 1991 box set. With the 25th anniversary of the release of their debut album approaching, the group reconvened to have an album in stores during 1994.

The album was recorded at studios in the Los Angeles area. "Only Waiting for You," "Camera," "It Won't Go Away," "In My Life," "Bad Boyz," "After the Storm," and "Panama" were recorded at O'Henry Sound Studios in Burbank, California. "Unequal Love," "Till It Shines," and "These Empty Days" were recorded at Jackson Browne's Groove Masters in Santa Monica, California. "Find a Dream" and "Street to Lean On" were recorded at Ocean Way Studios in Hollywood.

Unlike the group's three previous albums, other than a Beatles cover, all the compositions are by the principals with no outside writing contributions. The sessions were somewhat of a multi-generational affair, with Stills' children Jennifer and Christopher appearing as well as Ethan Johns, the son of the album's producer, Glyn Johns.

== Reception ==
Professional ratings
Review scores
Source	Rating
Allmusic	2/5 stars
The Music Box	3/5 stars

To promote After the Storm, the group played almost 100 concerts in 1994 including Woodstock '94, and played both The Tonight Show with Jay Leno and Late Show with David Letterman. According to Nash, however, even with the high visibility of the Woodstock anniversary festival and the television appearances, Atlantic did little in the way of promotion, which contributed to the album's low sales.

The Music Box called After the Storm "the best thing Crosby, Stills, and Nash has released in a long, long time", saying that Stills' songwriting talents had been revitalized and Nash's performance was dramatically improved. The reviewer singled out "Camera", "It Won't Go Away", and "Unequal Love" as the highlights. In contrast, a retrospective review in Allmusic opined that "Only 'These Empty Days' and the title cut, both from Graham Nash, have any of the old magic in them. The rest sounds like tracks made for solo discs that never saw the light of day and were combined in this form so as to sell product."

Like those on Live It Up, none of these songs found a permanent place in the group's repertoire, with only "Unequal Love" and "After the Storm" revisited a handful of times beyond the 1994 tours. On their 2011 tour without Stills, however, Crosby & Nash did perform "Camera".

== Track listing ==
No.	Title	Writer(s)	Lead Vocals	Length
1.	"Only Waiting for You"	Stephen Stills	Stills	3:57
2.	"Find a Dream"	Graham Nash	Nash	3:51
3.	"Camera"	David Crosby, Stills	Crosby	4:18
4.	"Unequal Love"	Nash	Nash	4:44
5.	"Till It Shines"	Crosby	Crosby	4:19
6.	"It Won't Go Away"	Stills	Stills with Crosby	4:17
7.	"These Empty Days"	Nash, Crosby	Stills with Crosby & Nash	2:30
8.	"In My Life"	John Lennon, Paul McCartney	Crosby, Stills & Nash	2:20
9.	"Street to Lean On"	Crosby	Crosby	3:36
10.	"Bad Boyz"	Stills	Stills	4:16
11.	"After the Storm"	Nash	Nash	3:34
12.	"Panama"	Stills	Stills with Crosby & Nash	4:15

== Personnel ==
Crosby, Stills & Nash

- David Crosby – backing vocals, acoustic guitar (2, 11), lead vocals (3, 5, 9), resonator guitar (11)
- Stephen Stills – backing vocals, lead vocals (1, 2, 6, 10, 12), acoustic piano (1), electric guitar (1, 2, 4, 6, 7, 12), bass (1, 6), acoustic guitar (2, 3, 7, 8), lead guitar (2, 5, 10), rhythm guitar (2)
- Graham Nash – backing vocals, lead vocals (2, 4, 11), acoustic piano (2), acoustic guitar (2, 4, 11), harmonica (2, 4, 8)

Additional personnel

- Mike Finnigan – synthesizers (1), Hammond B3 organ (1, 5, 6, 9, 10), additional backing vocals (1)
- Benmont Tench – Hammond B3 organ (4)
- Chris Stills – acoustic piano (7), hi-string acoustic guitar (8), Spanish guitar (12)
- Craig Doerge – keyboards (11)
- Joe Rotondi – keyboards (12)
- Ethan Johns – electric guitar (2, 7, 9), rhythm guitar (2, 5, 10), drums (2, 5, 7, 9–11), percussion (2, 5, 10, 11), acoustic guitar (7), mandocello (8)
- Michael Hedges – acoustic guitar (9)
- James "Hutch" Hutchinson – bass guitar (2, 4, 5, 7, 9)
- Alexis Sklarevski – bass guitar (3, 10, 12)
- Daniel "Freebo" Friedberg – bass guitar (11)
- Jody Cortez – drums (1)
- Tris Imboden – drums (3, 12)
- Rick Marotta – drums (6, 10)
- Lenny Castro – percussion (1)
- Rafael Padila – percussion (3, 12)
- Jen Stills – additional backing vocals (11)

Production

- Glyn Johns – producer, recording (2–12), mixing (2–12)
- Brett Swain – recording (1), assistant engineer (2–12)
- Paul Dieter – recording (2–12)
- Brian Malouf – mixing (1)
- Jeff Shannon – assistant engineer (1)
- Steve Holroyd – assistant engineer (2, 4, 5, 7, 9)
- Doug Sax – mastering at The Mastering Lab (Hollywood, California)
- Jan Crosby – production coordinator
- Nash Intermedia Studios – cover design
- Graham Nash – album design
- Kate Nook – album design
- Stephen Stills – album design
- Rand Wetherwax – album design
- Bill Siddons – management
- Gerry Tolman – management
