= Human Highway (disambiguation) =

Human Highway may refer to:

- Human Highway, a 1982 comedy film
- Human Highway (band), a Canadian indie rock band
- "Human Highway", a song on the 1978 Neil Young album Comes a Time
- Human Highway (album), unreleased album by Crosby, Stills, Nash & Young
