= Lady's Island =

Lady's Island may refer to:

- Lady's Island (South Carolina), United States
- Lady's Island Lake, Ireland

== See also ==
- Lacy Island, an uninhabited Canadian arctic island
- Lady Isle, a small island in the Firth of Clyde, Scotland
- "Lady of the Island", a folk song written by Graham Nash
