= Demos (Crosby, Stills & Nash album) =

Compilation album by Crosby, Stills & Nash
- Released: June 2, 2009
- Recorded: 1968–1971
- Label: Rhino
- Producer: Joel Bernstein, Neil Young, Graham Nash, Stephen Stills

Crosby, Stills & Nash chronology
Déjà Vu Live (2008)	Demos (2009)	CSN 2012 (2012)

Professional ratings
Review scores
Source	Rating
AllMusic	3.5/5 stars
Music Box	3.5/5 stars

Demos is a compilation album by Crosby, Stills & Nash, released in 2009 on Rhino Records. It peaked at #104 on the Billboard 200.

== Content ==
A compilation album, it consists of demo versions of solo and group songs recorded between 1968 and 1971. One recording, "Music Is Love," includes their some-time partner Neil Young. Most of the tracks feature solo vocals rather than the group's standard three-part harmony. Recordings took place at The Record Plant in New York City, and Wally Heider Studios in San Francisco and Los Angeles.

== Track listing ==
No.	Title	Writer(s)	Length
1.	"Marrakesh Express" (performed by Crosby, Stills & Nash)	Graham Nash	2:23
2.	"Almost Cut My Hair" (performed by Crosby)	David Crosby	5:26
3.	"You Don't Have to Cry" (performed by Stills)	Stephen Stills	1:23
4.	"Déjà Vu" (performed by Crosby)	Crosby	6:37
5.	"Sleep Song" (performed by Nash)	Nash	3:01
6.	"My Love Is a Gentle Thing" (performed by Stills)	Stills	2:06
7.	"Be Yourself" (performed by Nash)	Nash	2:58
8.	"Music Is Love" (performed by Crosby, Nash & Young)	Crosby, Nash, Neil Young	4:15
9.	"Singing Call" (performed by Stills)	Stills	3:02
10.	"Long Time Gone" (performed by Crosby & Stills)	Crosby	4:36
11.	"Chicago" (performed by Nash)	Nash	2:52
12.	"Love the One You're With" (performed by Stills)	Stills	3:13

== Personnel ==
- David Crosby – vocals, acoustic guitar
- Stephen Stills – vocals, acoustic guitar
- Graham Nash – vocals, piano, acoustic guitar
- Neil Young – vocal on "Music Is Love"
- Paul Rothchild – engineer
- Bill Halverson – engineer
