= Déjà Vu Live =

Live album by Crosby, Stills, Nash & Young
- Released: July 22, 2008
- Recorded: 2006
- Venue: Various
- Genre: Rock
- Length: 73:00
- Label: Reprise
- Producers: Neil Young; L. A. Johnson

Crosby, Stills, Nash & Young chronology
Greatest Hits (2005)	Déjà Vu Live (2008)	Demos (2009)

Professional ratings
Review scores
Source	Rating
AllMusic	3/5 stars
Billboard	(not rated)
Rolling Stone	3/5 stars

Déjà Vu Live is a live album by Crosby, Stills, Nash & Young, and their sixth in the quartet configuration, released by Reprise Records in 2008. It peaked at #153 on the Billboard 200, recorded on their 2006 Freedom of Speech tour. The album was released on vinyl in early 2009 and was pressed on 200-gram vinyl in Japan.

== Content ==
In 2006, Neil Young released his album critical of the Bush administration, Living with War. Preparing to go on tour in support of the album, he invited his partners Crosby, Stills & Nash to put aside their own plans and join him. The resulting CSNY tour yielded both a film and this album, which serves as its soundtrack. All of Young's songs derive from the Living with War album, including three versions of the title track, while no Crosby, Stills, or Nash song dates later than 1971.

The tour was characterized by a full range of reactions from audiences, particularly to the song "Let's Impeach the President". In particular, concerts in Atlanta and Orange County saw concertgoers walk out or give the finger to the performers. Young recalls the atmosphere in a June 2008 Billboard interview:

"I remember some faces. There's one guy I remember for sure, and he's not in the movie. This was a harrowing experience at times, and it's not an experience that I would like to repeat. I think it was a one-off. I think if I did this kind of thing for the rest of my life, I'd become like CNN and I don't really respect that very much. It's like the same thing on a loop. I don't see the need for that. I like to be a full-length program, not a repeating segment."

== Track listing ==
No.	Title	Writer(s)	Recorded	Length
1.	"What Are Their Names?"	David Crosby	August 13, 2006 Bethel Woods Center for the Arts	2:28
2.	"Living with War"	Neil Young		3:25
3.	"After the Garden"	Neil Young		3:41
4.	"Military Madness"	Graham Nash		4:02
5.	"Let's Impeach the President"	Neil Young		5:43
6.	"Déjà Vu"	David Crosby		7:15
7.	"Shock and Awe"	Neil Young		5:08
8.	"Families"	Neil Young		2:58
9.	"Wooden Ships"	David Crosby, Paul Kantner, Stephen Stills		8:18
10.	"Looking for a Leader"	Neil Young		3:55
11.	"For What It's Worth"	Stephen Stills		4:50
12.	"Living with War"	Neil Young		5:24
13.	"Roger and Out"	Neil Young		3:55
14.	"Find the Cost of Freedom"	Stephen Stills		3:55
15.	"Teach Your Children"	Graham Nash		3:20
16.	"Living with War"	Neil Young		3:01
17.	"The Restless Consumer (iTunes Store bonus track)"	Neil Young		6:23

== Personnel ==
- David Crosby — vocals, rhythm guitar
- Stephen Stills — vocals, guitars, keyboards
- Graham Nash — vocals, rhythm guitar, piano
- Neil Young — vocals, guitars, piano
- Ben Keith — pedal steel guitar
- Spooner Oldham — keyboards
- Rick Rosas — bass
- Chad Cromwell — drums
- Tom Bray — trumpet
