= Human Highway (album) =

Unfinished studio album by Crosby, Stills, Nash & Young

Studio album (unfinished) by Crosby, Stills, Nash & Young
- Recorded: Late May 1973 – May 1976
- Studio: Broken Arrow Ranch; Criteria Studios; Chicago Stadium
- Genre: folk rock; country rock; rock
- Producer: Neil Young

Crosby, Stills, Nash & Young recording chronology
4 Way Street (1971)	Human Highway (1973–1976)	CSN (1977)

Human Highway is an unfinished album by the American folk-rock supergroup Crosby, Stills, Nash & Young that was intended to follow their 1970 album Déjà Vu. The album was worked on in 1973, 1974, and 1976. Each time, the album was left unreleased due to differences in the band. Over the next four decades, numerous tracks were officially released.

== Production history ==
=== 1973 ===
In late May 1973, Crosby, Stills, Nash, & Young went on vacation in Hawaii to record an album tentatively named Human Highway. Nash would go on to say "We were all sort of on vacation and there was great music to be made. We had these great songs, like Neil's Human Highway and Maui Mama and we were rehearsing them on David's boat and it was sounding great. We tried to put an album together - and it would have been a great album."

"We all went there and hung out for a week or so, learning the songs and trying to figure out the album," Nash said. "And then something happened. I'm not even sure what happened now, it was so long ago," Nash said. "But those plans were shelved, and we went on with the rest of our lives."

Nash, in his memoir Wild Tales, recalled that "some business, some cocaine thing, went down, and suddenly we weren't talking to each other."

The band later gathered at Young's Broken Arrow Ranch in Redwood City, California, to record more new material, including Neil Young's "Human Highway", Stephen Stills' "See the Changes", Graham Nash's "And So It Goes", "Wind on the Water", and "Prison Song", and David Crosby's "Carry Me" and "Time After Time".

Author David Browne described the rehearsals at Young's ranch in his book Crosby, Stills, Nash & Young: The Wild, Definitive Saga of Rock's Greatest Supergroup as dysfunctional and uninspired. "I showed up to play . . . and one day we stopped playing. I just don't know," Stills said in 1974 to journalist Cameron Crowe. "I want to play. I want to sing. I want to make good records. And if that doesn't happen, I'm gone."

"We are such different people and we write so differently that it gives us what I like to call a much wider palette out of which to paint the album, much more than most people have," Crosby wrote in his autobiography Long Time Gone.

=== Reunion concerts ===
On October 4, 1973, Crosby, Stills, Nash & Young performed an acoustic set at a Manassas concert at San Francisco's Winterland Ballroom. The performance included unreleased songs from the Human Highway sessions, including As I Come of Age, Roll Another Number (For the Road), Human Highway, New Mama, And So It Goes, and Prison Song.

Human Highway, As I Come of Age, and Prison Song would be performed again three days later, after Crosby, Stills & Nash (Without Neil Young) performed another acoustic set after a Manassas concert at San Francisco's Winterland Ballroom.

In the summer of 1974, Crosby, Stills, Nash & Young embarked on a reunion tour that saw the debut of many unreleased songs, including My Angel, Carry Me, Traces, Love Art Blues, Myth of Sisyphus, Time After Time, Goodbye Dick, Hawaiian Sunrise, and Fieldworker. Many of these recordings would later be released in 2014 on the live album CSNY 1974.

=== 1974 ===
After the tour ended, the band gathered in December 1974 at Nash's basement studio in San Francisco to continue the album. These sessions were marred with disagreements, leading to Stills slicing up Nash's demo tape of Wind On The Water with a razor, to which Nash responded by kicking Stills out of his house.

The group later regrouped at the Record Plant, where they worked on Crosby's "Homeward Through the Haze," which ended when Young abandoned the sessions without explanation.

Crosby later said about the 1974 sessions "We had been at each other's faces for too long. If you put all of us together for very long we drain on each other quite a bit. At the end of that long tour, going into the studio was a hopeless cause. Still was burnt out. I was burnt. Even Nash was less than his usual self. And Neil. Neil, Mister Dependable. He came into the studio and said 'Great, out of sight. I'll be back tomorrow night' and never showed up again. That kind of trip really doesn't encourage you to work."

Songs believed to have been recorded in 1974 are Stills's Different Tongues and Guardian Angel, which eventually ended up on Illegal Stills and Long May You Run, and a largely unknown song titled Western Witches. Other songs include Young's New Mama and Nash's Mutiny.

Another session was attempted at the end of January 1975, but was quickly abandoned. Nash would later say (in relation to the song Guardian Angel) "The thing was, musically, to fit a major progression through a minor chord is... It's impossible. Everything in my musical soul rejected it. And that was the final straw, because I felt like my opinion wasn't being listened to."

=== 1976 ===
In 1976, Neil Young and Stephen Stills, during the sessions that led to the album Long May You Run, invited Graham Nash and David Crosby to Florida to add their vocals onto their tracks.

Stills invited drummer Joe Vitale to Criteria Studios in Florida in 1976. "He said, "Hey, I have two surprises. We're gonna start a Crosby, Stills, and Nash record,'" Vitale told me. "And I said, 'That's really amazing. What's the second surprise?' And he said, 'Neil's coming.' And I said, 'Oh my God.'" Neil Young would later contact Nash and Crosby to join, with Nash stating in an interview "and he said that he was working in Miami with Stephen, and wouldn't David and I be interested in going down and singing on some of the songs? And he sent us some of the songs, and they were great songs — 'Midnight on the Bay,' and stuff like that. And so we went and spent about two weeks putting vocals onto all of the tracks."

"It's usually the songs that bring us together. Because if Stephen has four and Neil has four and David has four and I have four songs, we've all got a project to work on, and we'll get it done," Nash said. "So it usually comes down to, the songs drive our relationship in many ways." Nash and Crosby, however, eventually headed back to Los Angeles to finish Whistling Down the Wire. Stills and Young were also committed to a tour and needed a new album to be ready before their tour commenced. Not wanting to wait anymore, they decided to revert back to an album by the duo only. Young stripped Nash's and Crosby's vocals off the songs they'd recorded. "I never should have erased that," Young would later tell an interviewer. "But I thought I was doing the right thing at the right time."

Nash had doubted this was actually the case. "And to this day, I still have no idea whether they actually wiped me and David's tracks, or whether they were smart enough to make a 16-track copy of that and then do overdubs to the copy," he said. This was the final time the band attempted to finish Human Highway. "We tried to put it together with Neil, but it wasn't happening." Crosby said. "For whatever reason, it didn't work"

Vitale denied any tapes were erased. "They did not erase those vocals," he said. "Especially Neil — Neil is such an archivist."

== Release history ==
Numerous songs were re-recorded and released over the years. Nash's "Prison Song" and "And So It Goes" ended up on his Wild Tales album in 1973. Stills' "First Things First," "My Angel," and "My Favorite Changes," all played on the 1974 tour, were recorded for Stills in 1974. Crosby and Nash included "Homeward Through the Haze", "Carry Me" and "Wind on the Water" on their Wind on the Water album. Young re-recorded "Human Highway" for his 1978 album Comes a Time.

Young's 1977 compilation Decade included a version of "Long May You Run" with the supposedly erased Crosby and Nash harmonies. (although the CD version of Decade did not include these harmonies.)

A version of "Pushed It Over the End", with Crosby and Nash adding new vocals to a 1974 live take, was planned for Decade but was removed at the last minute. It later surfaced as the B side to an Italian single.

In 1991, Crosby, Stills & Nash's box set CSN included three songs from the Human Highway sessions: "See the Changes", "Homeward Through the Haze", and "Taken at All"

Stills' 2013 box set Carry On included the Stills-Young track "Black Coral" with Crosby and Nash contributions included.

Neil Young Archives Volume II: 1972–1976 contained numerous Crosby and Nash recordings from 1976 that were previously assumed to have been erased, including "Midnight on the Bay", "Ocean Girl", and two different takes of "Human Highway."

In interviews, Graham Nash has been quoted as saying Human Highway's definitive track list was already decided upon and that there would have been ten songs on the record. These ten songs were never publicly revealed.

On X, David Crosby was asked "Given the chance, would you resurrect Human Highway a la recent Pet Sounds box?" Crosby's response was "Doubt I'd get that chance"

== Retrospective ==
The band have spoken highly of Human Highway in the years since its abandonment.

Crosby told journalist Dave Zimmer that Human Highway "would have been the best one, man."

"It's the Smile of the Seventies," David Browne said, in reference to The Beach Boys' infamous unfinished album. "They were at a point in their career where their singing was still strong. There was a lot of indulgence going on, but their singing was still strong. They hadn't blown their voices out in '73 or '74. They were still at the top of their game. It would've been a more mature, wiser, beaten-up Déjà Vu. And so yeah, you're kind of reminded all over again, what a missed opportunity."

Upon the release of Neil Young Archives Volume II, Crosby endorsed the idea of reconstructing Human Highway on X, saying it "would have been very good". Stills shared black-and-white photos on Twitter and Instagram of the band at Young's ranch in 1973. One photo had the hashtags: #HumanHighway and #ItsNeverTooLate.

"We had great songs. It was going to be a great album," Nash had said in an interview. "We had a great title. Human Highway? Are you kidding me? That's fabulous."

== Songs ==
=== Released songs featuring all four members ===
Sources:

- "And So It Goes" (Nash) (Wild Tales)
- "Black Coral" (Stills) (Carry On)
- "Homeward Through the Haze" (Crosby) (CSN)
- "Human Highway" (1973 version) (Young) (Neil Young Archives Volume II: 1972–1976)
- "Human Highway" (1976 version) (Young) (Neil Young Archives Volume II: 1972–1976)
- "Long May You Run" (Young) (Decade)
- "Midnight on the Bay" (Young) (Neil Young Archives Volume II: 1972–1976)
- "Ocean Girl" (Young) (Neil Young Archives Volume II: 1972–1976)
- "See the Changes" (Stills) (CSN)
- "Taken at All" (Nash) (CSN)
- "Through My Sails" (Young) (Zuma)
- Crosby, Stills, Nash & Young versions of "Little Blind Fish" and "Prison Song" have also leaked.

=== Rumored songs ===
Numerous songs believed to have been intended for Human Highway were later re-recorded by the individual members.

- "As I Come Of Age" (Stills) (Stills)
- "Carry Me" (Crosby) (Wind on the Water)
- "Critical Mass" (Crosby) (Wind on the Water)
- "Different Tongues" (Stills) (Illegal Stills)
- "First Things First" (Stills) (Stills)
- "Guardian Angel" (Stills) (Long May You Run)
- "Hawaiian Sunrise" (Young) (Neil Young Archives Volume II: 1972–1976)
- "It's All Right" (Nash) (Unreleased 1974 concert film)
- "Let It Shine" (Young) (Long May You Run)
- "Love/Art Blues" (Young) (Neil Young Archives Volume II: 1972–1976)
- "Mutiny" (Nash) (Whistling Down the Wire)
- "My Angel" (Stills) (Stills)
- "My Favorite Changes" (Stills) (Stills)
- "New Mama" (Young) (Tonight's the Night)
- "Pushed It Over the End" (Young) (Neil Young Archives Volume II: 1972–1976)
- "Separate Ways" (Young) (Neil Young Archives Volume II: 1972–1976)
- "Time After Time" (Crosby) (Whistling Down the Wire)
- "Traces" (Young) (Neil Young Archives Volume II: 1972–1976)
- "Western Witches" (Unknown) (Unreleased)
- "Wind on the Water" (Nash) (Wind on the Water)
