= Wild Tales =

Wild Tales may refer to:

- Wild Tales (album), a 1974 album by Graham Nash
- Wild Tales (film), a 2014 Argentine film
- Wild Tales, a 2014 autobiography by Graham Nash
