= Jen Stills =

American singer-songwriter

- Origin: Arizona
- Label: AO Recordings

Jen Stills is a singer and songwriter who was raised in Arizona and later moved to Los Angeles where she lives today. She is the daughter of the American rock musician Stephen Stills.

Stills has appeared on Ray LaMontagne's album Trouble on the track “Narrow Escape,” and on the title track of Crosby Stills and Nash's After the Storm. She toured Europe in 2008 appearing with Rufus Wainwright's band and is working and writing in Nashville.

Her song "Good Intentions" was included on the soundtrack for the film The Prince and Me.

== Discography ==
- "These Days" (AO Recordings, 2009)

== Soundtrack ==
- Brothers & Sisters episode "A Valued Family" (2010) - with "Love the One You're With" as performer
- Brothers & Sisters episode "Nearlyweds" (2009) - with "These Days" as performer
- The Prince and Me (2004) - with "Good Intentions"
