= Long Time Gone (Crosby, Stills & Nash song) =

Song by Crosby, Stills & Nash

from the album Crosby, Stills & Nash
- A-side: "Suite: Judy Blue Eyes"
- Released: May 29, 1969
- Recorded: Early 1969
- Studio: Wally Heider, Hollywood
- Length: 4:17
- Label: Atlantic
- Songwriter: David Crosby
- Producers: Crosby, Stills & Nash

"Long Time Gone" is a song by the supergroup Crosby, Stills & Nash, released as the penultimate track on their debut album Crosby, Stills & Nash (1969). The song was written by David Crosby in response to the assassination of Robert F. Kennedy in 1968. The song was also released as the B-side of "Suite: Judy Blue Eyes".

== Background and composition ==
David Crosby wrote "Long Time Gone" as a response to the June 5, 1968 assassination of United States senator Robert F. Kennedy by the morning of June 6, as Crosby had known about the news when it happened.

Although Crosby primarily wrote the song, he did credit Stephen Stills with helping to bring the track to fruition. The first recording of the song was taped on June 13, 1968, with Stills handling most of the instrumentation on the first recording. Crosby was not able to get a proper recording down after five weeks, with the version of the song recorded by Crosby and Stills being thrown away, Stills asked Crosby and Graham Nash to head home on March 11, while he worked on the song alone, as engineer Bill Halverson wrote "The sound would be in his head, and he had so many ideas it was just a matter of "How quick can I get these down" As quick as I could rewind to another track, he was onto something else. You just had to keep up." When Crosby and Nash returned the following morning, Stills had recorded almost every instrument except for the drums, as the electric rhythm guitar had already been recorded by Crosby. Crosby, pleased with Stills' work, reportedly downed a few bottles of wine and recorded a new vocal track.

== Release and reception ==
"Long Time Gone" was released as the penultimate song on Crosby Stills & Nash's eponymous debut album (1969), and had mixed reception. In a review of the song for AllMusic, Lindsay Planer called it "one of David Crosby’s most direct, confrontational and politically motivated musical statements", adding that "Stills, ever the multi-instrumentalist, provides "Long Time Gone" with a remarkably solid bed of bass, organ and some scathing lead electric guitar, perfectly complementing the lyrical content.", concluding in his review that "The obvious disgust and resentment in Crosby’s vocal delivery has, if anything, grown more resolute in the subsequent decades as the message of questioning authority and the rights of the individual to be heard and acknowledged by their respective governments continued to be challenged." Paste magazine writer Lee Zimmerman placed it at number eight in his ranking of the 13 best Crosby, Stills & Nash songs, writing that the song "affirmed [Crosby's] ongoing insurgence in the form of outraged rebuke to those in authority who denied the winds of change breezing within a younger generation fed up with the norm." Classic Rock Review calls it "a cool 1960s pop/rock song with Stills playing a great funky bass, organ, with lead guitar licks throughout the verse and fantastically strong harmonies in rock context during the chorus." The song was included on the band's 1991 self titled box set as the seventh track. The song was also included on the band's 2005 Greatest Hits album. The song's initial demo recorded before Graham Nash was released on the band's 2009 demo album Demos.

== Personnel ==
According to the liner notes of the CSN box set:

- David Crosby – vocals, electric rhythm guitar
- Stephen Stills – vocals, guitars, bass, organ
- Graham Nash – vocals
- Dallas Taylor – drums
