= Looking Forward =

Studio album by Crosby, Stills, Nash & Young
- Released: October 26, 1999
- Recorded: November 3, 1996 – July 21, 1999
- Studio: Broken Arrow Ranch
- Genre: Folk rock
- Length: 53:17
- Label: Reprise
- Producers: Crosby, Stills, Nash & Young; Joe Vitale; Ben Keith; Stanley Johnston

Crosby, Stills, Nash & Young chronology
| After the Storm (1994) | Looking Forward (1999) | Greatest Hits (2005) |

Professional ratings
Review scores
| Source | Rating |
|---|---|
| AllMusic | 2.5/5 stars |
| Robert Christgau | C |
| The Music Box | 4/5 stars |

Looking Forward is the eighth and final studio album by Crosby, Stills & Nash, and their third as a quartet with Neil Young. It was released on Reprise Records in 1999 and peaked at number 26 on the Billboard 200, with total sales nearing 400,000.

== Background and recording ==
Crosby, Stills & Nash toured extensively through the 1990s, playing almost as many shows as they had in the previous decades combined. Since their previous album, no new solo albums were forthcoming from Stephen Stills or Graham Nash, but David Crosby had discovered his adult son James Raymond, the two starting a band with Jeff Pevar yielding an album CPR in 1998. However, the band's relationship with Atlantic Records had soured, partly over a lack of push for After the Storm, but mostly over the perception that the label now had very little interest in the group after they had made the company millions during the 1970s. They terminated their contract with Atlantic in 1997, and began to record CSN tracks out of pocket without a record deal. Working with Stills to compile the Buffalo Springfield retrospective box set, Neil Young became intrigued with these CSN sessions. Playing on some tracks in process, Young brought in three recordings he had earmarked for one of his own albums, "Looking Forward", "Slowpoke", and "Out of Control". The possibility of a new CSNY album attracted the attention of Young's label Reprise Records, which duly released the album once completed.

"Faith in Me" and "No Tears Left" were recorded in Ga Ga's Room in Los Angeles early on in the recording process. "Stand and Be Counted", "Seen Enough", "Dream for Him" and "Sanibel" were recorded at Conway Recording Studios in Hollywood. "Heartland" was recorded at Ocean Studios in Burbank, California. The remainder of the album was recorded at Neil Young's facility, Redwood Digital, in Woodside, California.

== Reception ==
Looking Forward has sold approximately 370,000 copies in the United States. It received mixed critical reviews. In 2000, CSNY launched the CSNY2K Tour in support of the album, the quartet's first tour since the summer stadium tour of 1974.

== Track listing ==
| No. | Title | Writer(s) | Lead Vocals | Length |
|---|---|---|---|---|
| 1. | "Faith in Me" | Stephen Stills, Joe Vitale | Stills | 4:21 |
| 2. | "Looking Forward" | Neil Young | Young with Crosby, Stills & Nash | 3:07 |
| 3. | "Stand and Be Counted" | David Crosby, James Raymond | Crosby | 4:52 |
| 4. | "Heartland" | Graham Nash | Nash | 4:28 |
| 5. | "Seen Enough" | Stills | Stills | 5:14 |
| 6. | "Slowpoke" | Young | Young | 4:31 |
| 7. | "Dream for Him" | Crosby | Crosby | 5:03 |
| 8. | "No Tears Left" | Stills | Stills | 5:06 |
| 9. | "Out of Control" | Young | Young | 4:09 |
| 10. | "Someday Soon" | Nash | Nash with Crosby & Stills | 3:43 |
| 11. | "Queen of Them All" | Young | Young | 4:23 |
| 12. | "Sanibel" | Denny Sarokin | Nash & Young | 4:20 |

== Personnel ==
=== CSNY ===
- David Crosby – vocals, electric guitar (3), acoustic guitar (7)
- Stephen Stills – vocals, Hammond B3 organ (1), acoustic guitar (1, 2, 5, 8, 10), electric guitar (1, 3, 4, 7, 8, 11), bass guitar (1), batá drum (1), cowbell (1), cymbals (1), maracas (1, 8), timbales (1), double bass (8), percussion (11)
- Graham Nash – vocals, acoustic guitar (10)
- Neil Young – vocals (all tracks), electric guitar (1, 3–5, 7, 8, 11), acoustic guitar (2, 6, 10), piano (9), harmonica (6), tiple (9), celesta (11)

=== Additional musicians ===
- Joe Vitale – additional Hammond B3 organ (1), batá drum (1), bateria (1), drums (3–5, 7, 8, 10–12)
- Spooner Oldham – pump organ (2), keyboards (6, 9)
- Mike Finnigan – Hammond B3 organ (3, 4, 8, 11)
- James Raymond – acoustic piano (4, 7)
- Craig Doerge – keyboards (12)
- Ben Keith – Dobro (2), pedal steel guitar (2, 6, 9)
- Snuffy Garrett – guitar (12)
- Denny Sarokin – guitar (12)
- Donald Dunn – bass guitar (2, 3, 5, 6, 9–11)
- Gerald Johnson – bass guitar (4)
- James "Hutch" Hutchinson – bass guitar (7)
- Bob Glaub – bass guitar (12)
- Jim Keltner – drums (2, 6, 9)
- Luis Conte – bass drum (1), batá drum (1), congas (1), percussion (7)
- Alex Acuña – additional timbales (1)
- Joe Lala – additional congas (1)
- Lenny Castro – percussion (4)
- Vince Charles – percussion (12)

=== Production ===
- Crosby, Stills, Nash & Young – producers (all tracks), mixing
- Joe Vitale – producer (1, 8, 12), engineer (1, 8)
- Ben Keith – producer (2, 6, 9)
- Stanley Johnston – producer (12), engineer (12)
- Stephen Stills – engineer (1, 8)
- Ed Cherney – live drum engineer (1, 8)
- Tim Mulligan – engineer (2, 6, 9–11), digital mastering
- Bill Halverson – engineer (3, 5, 7), mixing
- Robi Banerji – engineer (4)
- Paul Dieter – engineer (4)
- Aaron Lepley – second live drum engineer (1, 8)
- John Hausmann – second engineer (2, 6, 9–11)
- Tony Flores – second engineer (3, 5, 7)
- Barry Goldberg – second engineer (3, 5, 7)
- Lior Goldenberg – second engineer (3, 5, 7)
- Robert Breen – second engineer (4)
- DeVal Day – second engineer (4)
- Jim Mitchell – second engineer (12)
- John Nowland – analog/HDCD engineer
- Nathaniel Kunkel – additional engineer
- Keith Woods – tape archivist
- Gary Burden – art direction, design, inlay typography, management
- Jenice Heo – art direction, design, typography
- Henry Diltz – band photography
- Pegi Young – front cover photography
- R. Mac Holbert – outside folder band photo imaging
- Frank Gironda – management
- Gerry Tolman – management

== Charts ==
Chart performance for Looking Forward
| Chart (1999) | Peak position |
|---|---|
| US Billboard 200 | 26 |
| Canadian RPM 100 Albums | 17 |
| Norwegian VG-lista Albums | 7 |
| UK Album Charts | 54 |
| Japanese Album Charts | 55 |
| Dutch MegaCharts Albums | 15 |
| French Album Charts | 60 |
| West German Album Charts | 10 |
| Swedish Album Charts | 26 |
