= Lady of the Island =

Song by Crosby, Stills & Nash

from the album Crosby, Stills & Nash
- Released: May 29, 1969
- Recorded: February 11, 1969
- Studio: Wally Heider, Hollywood
- Genre: Folk, soft rock
- Length: 2:39
- Label: Atlantic
- Songwriter: Graham Nash
- Producers: David Crosby; Graham Nash; Stephen Stills

"Lady of the Island" is a folk song written by Graham Nash in the late 1960s. The song appears on Crosby, Stills & Nash's critically acclaimed, eponymous debut album. The song is notable for taking its inspiration from fellow folk musician Joni Mitchell, with whom Nash was romantically involved at the time. It was also the only song from the debut album not performed during their Woodstock performance.

Nash wrote this song while he was a member of the Hollies, who rejected the song as being too personal. Along with the Hollies' rejection of Nash's song "Marrakesh Express," this caused Nash to leave the Hollies in 1968. (Source: "Dick Clark's 25 Years of Rock and Roll" (1981))

== Personnel ==
- Graham Nash – lead vocals, harmony vocals, acoustic guitar
- David Crosby – harmony vocals
