= Helplessly Hoping =

Single by Crosby, Stills, and Nash

from the album Crosby, Stills & Nash
- A-side: "Marrakesh Express"
- Released: June 1969
- Recorded: December 1968
- Studio: Wally Heider's Studio 3
- Genre: Folk rock; country
- Label: Atlantic
- Songwriter: Stephen Stills
- Producer: Paul Rothchild

Crosby, Stills, and Nash singles chronology
"Helplessly Hoping" (1969)	"Suite: Judy Blue Eyes" (1969)

"Helplessly Hoping" is a song released in 1969 by the American folk rock group Crosby, Stills, and Nash written by Stephen Stills. It was first recorded by Stephen Stills on a 1968 demonstration album released in 2007: Just Roll Tape. Crosby, Stills, and Nash first recorded the song at Wally Heider's Studio 3, Hollywood in December 1968 during their first recording session as a group, with producer Paul Rothchild. The song was first released by Atlantic Records on Crosby, Stills, and Nash's eponymous debut album on May 29, 1969. In June 1969, they released it as the B-side of their debut single "Marrakesh Express".

== Lyrics ==
The song was written for Judy Collins and is about Stephen Stills' struggles after their break-up. It uses both alliteration and wordplay in its lyrics:

"Helplessly Hoping, Her Harlequin Hovers...",
"Gasping at Glimpses, of Gentle...";
"Wordlessly Watching he Waits by the Window and Wonders...",
"Heartlessly Helping, Himself to Her bad dreams He worries... Did He Hear...",
"Stand by the Stairway, you'll See Something Certain",
"Love isn't Lying, it's Loose in a Lady who Lingers... Saying she is Lost".

In the chorus, numbers have dual meaning. The harmonic voicing is also linked to these numbers, with every new line adding an extra voice:

They are One Person,
They are Two (Too) Alone,
They are Three (Free) Together,
They are Four (For) Each Other.

== Personnel ==
- Stephen Stills – lyrics, lead vocals, harmony vocals, acoustic guitar
- David Crosby – lead vocals, harmony vocals
- Graham Nash – lead vocals, harmony vocals

== In popular culture ==
- The song was prominently featured in the 2018 Alex Garland film Annihilation.
- The song was also featured briefly in the 2020 Naughty Dog game The Last of Us Part II, with Joel playing the song on guitar.
- The song was also featured briefly in the 2019 film The Art of Racing in the Rain.

== Cover versions ==
- The song was covered by the American bluegrass band J. D. Crowe and the New South in 1986. The cover was included in their seventh studio album Straight Ahead. An additional bluegrass cover by Dré Anders featuring the Gibson Brothers was released as a single in October 2023.
- The song was also covered by Australian band Taxiride in 1999.
- The song was also covered by the American a cappella group Home Free in 2017.
- The song was also covered by the American rock band Of Mice & Men in 2021. The cover was included in their third EP Ad Infinitum and their seventh studio album Echo.
- The song was also covered by the American band Foxes and Fossils in 2013.
- This song was also covered by the American singer songwriter Richie Havens.
- This song was also covered by the Austrian folk rock band S.T.S in 1987.
