= Live It Up (Crosby, Stills & Nash album) =

Studio album by Crosby, Stills and Nash
- Released: June 26, 1990
- Recorded: February 1, 1986 – February 5, 1990
- Genre: Rock
- Length: 39:17
- Label: Atlantic
- Producers: Crosby, Stills & Nash; Joe Vitale, Stanley Johnston

Crosby, Stills and Nash chronology
American Dream (1988)	Live It Up (1990)	CSN (1991)

Singles from Live It Up
- 1. "Live It Up" Released: May 25, 1990

Live It Up is the sixth studio album by Crosby, Stills & Nash, and their fourth studio album in the trio configuration, released on Atlantic Records in 1990. It peaked at No. 57 on the Billboard 200 with current sales of 300,000. It is the first of their studio albums not to gain either a gold or platinum certification by the RIAA. It was issued in all formats at the time (compact disc, cassette tape, and vinyl record) and was later released for streaming.

== Background ==
After David Crosby's release from prison, he reunited with Stephen Stills and Graham Nash for CSN tours in 1987 and 1988. The recording of American Dream with Neil Young took place over the course of those years, but the quartet opted not to tour to promote it. The album was not well received, and Stills viewed it as "contrived". In 1989, Stills and Young commenced tours with their own bands, while Crosby and Nash began work on what was to be a new Crosby & Nash record. Crosby also released his second solo album Oh Yes I Can that same year. Stills regrouped with Crosby and Nash to perform at the collapse of the Berlin Wall in late 1989, and the sessions for the new Crosby & Nash album evolved into the new Crosby, Stills & Nash one instead. Atlantic had encouraged the inclusion of Crosby into the Stills–Nash project that became Daylight Again back in 1981.

== Recording ==
The album was recorded at several recording studios around Los Angeles, the majority at The Record Plant, although part of "Live It Up" began at the Home-Brew Studio in Ohio and was finished at the professional location. "If Anybody Had a Heart", "Arrows", and "After the Dolphin" were recorded at Devonshire Studios; "(Got to Keep) Open" was recorded at Capitol Records studios.

Nash, the nominal leader of these recordings, expressed misgivings about the sessions. In addition to feeling uncomfortable in a leadership position, he stated that "only once did we sing together on one mike. So in that sense, it was not really a true CSN record."

The band toured to promote the album in 1990, but none of these songs found a permanent place in the group's repertoire, with only "House of Broken Dreams" and "Yours and Mine" being performed a handful of times beyond the 1990 outing.

== Reception ==
Professional ratings
Review scores
Source	Rating
AllMusic	1.5/5 stars
Entertainment Weekly	C+
Select	1/5 medals

Greg Sandow commented in Entertainment Weekly that Live it Up is dominated by tunes which are catchy but generic and mindless. He added that the songs "Yours and Mine", "Arrows", and in particular "After the Dolphin" offer genuine depth and meaning, but that the overall product is "a strangely bland album that only die-hard fans will love."

Jeff Giles covered Live it Up in his retrospective series "Whoops!", assessing it as an embarrassingly failed attempt to marry the hippie sensibilities of Crosby, Stills & Nash's past with the glossy production values of the era in which the album was recorded. He cited its contemporary, Don Henley's The End of the Innocence, as a much more successful attempt at this combination. In a retrospective review for AllMusic, William Ruhlmann praised both the band's singing and the performances of the session musicians, and argued that it is only a complete lack of good songs which makes Live it Up the weakest Crosby, Stills & Nash studio album.

== Track listing ==
Side one
No.	Title	Writer(s)	Lead Vocals	Length
1.	"Live It Up"	Joe Vitale	Nash	3:54
2.	"If Anybody Had a Heart"	John David Souther, Danny Kortchmar	Nash	4:28
3.	"Tomboy"	Stephen Stills	Stills	3:22
4.	"Haven't We Lost Enough?"	Stills, Kevin Cronin	Stills with Crosby & Nash	3:06
5.	"Yours and Mine"	Craig Doerge, David Crosby, Graham Nash	Crosby	4:21

Side two
No.	Title	Writer(s)	Lead Vocals	Length
1.	"(Got to Keep) Open"	Stills, Nash	Stills	4:40
2.	"Straight Line"	Tony Beard	Nash	3:12
3.	"House of Broken Dreams"	Nash	Nash	3:18
4.	"Arrows"	Michael Hedges, Crosby	Crosby	3:51
5.	"After the Dolphin"	Nash, Doerge	Nash	5:05

== Personnel ==
Crosby, Stills & Nash

- David Crosby – backing vocals, electric guitar (3), lead vocals (5, 9, 10)
- Stephen Stills – backing vocals, lead guitar (1), guitar solo (2), lead vocals (3, 4, 6, 10), keyboards (3), electric guitar (3, 7), acoustic guitar (4, 6), bass (6)
- Graham Nash – backing vocals, lead vocals (1, 2, 7, 8, 10), acoustic guitar (3, 8)

Additional personnel

- Joe Vitale – drums, keyboards (1, 2, 5), guitar synthesizer (1, 2, 5), synth bass (1, 3, 10), synthesizers (6, 8), percussion (7), synth strings (9), organ (10)
- Craig Doerge – keyboards (2, 5, 7–10)
- Bruce Hornsby – acoustic piano (6), accordion (6)
- Michael Landau – guitars (2, 10)
- Roger McGuinn – guitars (2)
- Peter Frampton – guitar solo (7)
- Leland Sklar – bass (2, 9, 10)
- Bob Glaub – bass (3, 5, 7, 8)
- Michael Fisher – percussion (2, 10)
- Michito Sanchez – percussion (3, 6)
- Tony Beard – percussion programming (5), electric guitar (7)
- Vince Charles – percussion (9)
- Branford Marsalis – soprano saxophone (2, 9)
- The Williams Family – additional vocals (1)
- John David Souther – additional vocals (2)
- Rand Wetherwax – sound design including radio broadcast voices of Simon Jones and Harry S. Truman (10)

== Production ==
- Crosby, Stills & Nash – producers
- Stanley Johnston – producer, engineer (1, 3–9), mixing
- Joe Vitale – producer, additional engineer
- Niko Bolas – engineer (2, 10)
- Allen Abrahamson – additional engineer
- Ray Blair – additional engineer
- Scott Gordon – additional engineer
- Charlie Paakkari – additional engineer
- Jim Mitchell – additional engineer
- Eric Schilling – additional engineer
- Mike Bosley – assistant engineer
- Darryl Dobson – assistant engineer
- Larry Goodwin – assistant engineer
- Bill Dooley – editing
- Bob Ludwig – mastering at Masterdisk (New York City, New York)
- Jimmy Wachtel – art direction
- David Peters – cover art
- Sarajo Frieden – logotype
