= Ohio (Crosby, Stills, Nash & Young song) =

Protest song performed by Crosby, Stills, Nash & Young

Single by Crosby, Stills, Nash & Young
- B-side: "Find the Cost of Freedom"
- Released: June 1970
- Recorded: May 21, 1970
- Studio: Record Plant Recording Studios, Hollywood
- Genre: Rock
- Length: 2:58
- Label: Atlantic
- Songwriter: Neil Young
- Producers: Crosby, Stills, Nash & Young

Crosby, Stills, Nash & Young singles chronology
"Teach Your Children" (1970)	"Ohio" (1970)	"Our House" (1970)

Audio sample
- file; help

"Ohio" is a song written by Neil Young in reaction to the Kent State shootings of May 4, 1970, and performed by Crosby, Stills, Nash & Young. It was released as a single, backed with Stephen Stills's "Find the Cost of Freedom", peaking at number 14 on the US Billboard Hot 100 and number 16 in Canada.

Although live versions of "Ohio" and "Find the Cost of Freedom" were included on the group's 1971 double album 4 Way Street, the studio versions of both songs did not appear on an LP until the group's compilation So Far was released in 1974. The song also appeared on the Neil Young compilation album Decade, released in 1977; his compilation album Greatest Hits, released in 2004; and on his album Live at Massey Hall, recorded in 1971 but unreleased until 2007.

In 2025, the publication Rolling Stone ranked the song at number 9 on its list of "The 100 Best Protest Songs of All Time."

== Recording ==
Young wrote the lyrics to "Ohio" after seeing the photos of the incident in Life Magazine. The quartet rehearsed the song with their new rhythm section of Calvin Samuels and Johnny Barbata.

The track was recorded by Bill Halverson on May 21, 1970, at Record Plant Studio 3 in Hollywood, California, according to the liner notes in Greatest Hits. The band recorded it live in just a few takes. In the fadeout, David Crosby's voice—with a tone evocative of keening—can be heard with the words "Four!", "How many more?" and "Why?". "David Crosby cried when we finished this take," Young said in his liner notes for the Decade retrospective, adding that the Kent State incident was "probably the biggest lesson ever learned at an American place of learning".

During the same session, they recorded the single's equally direct B-side: Stephen Stills's ode to the war's dead, "Find the Cost of Freedom".

The record was mastered with the participation of the four principals, rush-released by Atlantic and heard on the radio with only a few weeks' delay—even though the group's hit song "Teach Your Children" was already on the charts at the time.

== Lyrics and reception ==
"Tin soldiers and Nixon coming" refers to the May 4, 1970 Kent State shootings, where Ohio National Guard officers shot and killed four students during a protest against the Vietnam War. The shootings happened following several days of protests and clashes, including the arson of the campus ROTC building. Crosby once stated that Young keeping Nixon's name in the lyrics was "the bravest thing I ever heard." The American counterculture of the 1960s responded positively to the song and saw the musicians as spokespersons for their ideas. The lyrics help evoke a mood of horror, outrage, and shock in the wake of the shootings, especially the line "four dead in Ohio", repeated throughout the song.

Based on opinion polling the day after the shooting, a majority of the American public placed the greatest blame for the violence on protestors rather than National Guard members. After the single's release, it was banned from some AM radio stations including in the state of Ohio, but received airplay on underground FM stations in larger cities and college towns. More recently, the song has received regular airplay on classic rock stations. In 2009, the song was inducted into the Grammy Hall of Fame. The song was selected as the 395th Greatest Song of All Time by Rolling Stone in 2010.

An article in The Guardian in 2010 describes the song as the "greatest protest record" and "the pinnacle of a very 1960s genre", while also saying "The revolution never came." President Richard Nixon, who is criticized in the song, won a landslide reelection in 1972, which included winning the 1972 United States presidential election in Ohio by a margin of over 21%. In June 2026, CBS News included Find the Cost of Freedom in its list of the 250 essential American songs of the past 250 years.

== The Dandy Warhols version ==
"Ohio"

Song by The Dandy Warhols

from the album The Black Album/Come On Feel The Dandy Warhols
- Released: April 20, 2004
- Genre: Neo-psychedelia; alternative rock
- Length: 4:39
- Songwriter: Neil Young
- Producer: Courtney Taylor-Taylor

In 2004, American alternative/psychedelic rock band The Dandy Warhols released a cover of the song in their album The Black Album/Come On Feel The Dandy Warhols, a compilation including cover songs, as well as previously unreleased material recorded between 1995 and 2003. Musically, this version uses "droning synthesizers" to produce an "alt/psychedelia" sound and atmosphere.

== Personnel ==
- David Crosby – vocals, rhythm guitar
- Stephen Stills – vocals, guitars
- Graham Nash – vocals
- Neil Young – vocals, guitars
- Calvin Samuels – bass
- John Barbata – drums

== Charts ==
=== Weekly charts ===
Chart (1970)	Peak position
Australia KMR	44
Canada RPM Top Singles	16
Netherlands (Single Top 100)	13
U.S. Billboard Hot 100	14
U.S. Cash Box Top 100	14
U.S. Record World Top 100	13

== See also ==
- List of anti-war songs
- Kent State shootings
