= Suite: Judy Blue Eyes =

Song of Crosby, Stills & Nash

- Swedish picture sleeve

Single by Crosby, Stills & Nash

from the album Crosby, Stills & Nash
- B-side: "Long Time Gone"
- Released: September 1969
- Recorded: February 1969
- Studio: Wally Heider, Hollywood
- Genre: Folk rock, soft rock
- Length: 7:28 (album version); 4:35 (single edit)
- Label: Atlantic
- Songwriter: Stephen Stills
- Producers: David Crosby; Graham Nash; Stephen Stills

Crosby, Stills & Nash singles chronology
"Marrakesh Express" (1969)	"Suite: Judy Blue Eyes" (1969)	"Woodstock" (1970)

Audio
- "Suite: Judy Blue Eyes" on YouTube

"Suite: Judy Blue Eyes" is a song written by Stephen Stills and performed by Crosby, Stills & Nash (CSN). It appeared on the group's self-titled debut album in 1969 and was released as a single, reaching number 21 on the Billboard Hot 100 pop singles chart. In Canada, "Suite: Judy Blue Eyes" peaked at number 11. The song imitates the form of a classical music suite as an ordered set of musical pieces.

== Background ==
The title "Suite: Judy Blue Eyes" (a play on words for "Sweet Judy Blue Eyes") refers to Stephen Stills' former girlfriend, singer/songwriter Judy Collins, and the lyrics to most of the suite's sections consist of his thoughts about her and their imminent breakup. During a July 15, 2007 interview for the National Public Radio program All Things Considered, Stills revealed that Collins was present in the studio when the demo tapes were recorded and had advised her, "Don't stay in here [in the studio] all night now." Stills also commented that the breakup with Collins "was imminent. ... We were just a little too big for one house." Stills said that he liked parts of this demo version of "Suite: Judy Blue Eyes" better than the released version; the song and other demos of early Crosby, Stills and Nash songs were released commercially on the album Just Roll Tape.

Collins and Stills had met in 1967 and dated for two years. In 1969, she was appearing in the New York Shakespeare Festival musical production of Peer Gynt and had fallen in love with her co-star Stacy Keach, eventually leaving Stills for him. Stills was devastated by the possible breakup and wrote the song as a response to his sadness. In a 2000 interview, Collins gave her impressions of when she first heard the song:

[Stephen] came to where I was singing one night on the West Coast and brought his guitar to the hotel and he sang me "Suite: Judy Blue Eyes," the whole song. And of course it has lines in it that referred to my therapy. And so he wove that all together in this magnificent creation. So the legacy of our relationship is certainly in that song.

Collins elaborated in a 2017 interview:

Afterwards, we both cried – and then I said: "Oh, Stephen, it’s such a beautiful song. But it’s not winning me back." I’ve always understood that people have to write about their lives. Most of all, I felt the song was flattering and heartbreaking – for both of us. Neither one of us walked away from that relationship relieved. We were feeling like, "Whoa, what happened?”

== Composition ==
The recording features an acoustic guitar tuned to EEEEBE ("Bruce Palmer Modal Tuning") vs. the standard EADGBE tuning. This style of tuning would later be used for the Déjà Vu songs "4 + 20" and "Carry On".

"Suite: Judy Blue Eyes" has four distinct sections. The shortened version released as a single cut the second and fourth verses from the first section, the third and fourth verses from the second section, and the final verse and preceding break from the third section, and shortened the guitar break between the second and the third sections. The final section is the only part that stayed fully intact.

The first section has four verses, featuring a chorus of "I am yours, you are mine, you are what you are." The lead vocal is performed by Stills, with Crosby and Nash providing harmonies.

The second section is performed in half-time relative to the first section, and features four verses of three-part harmony from the band, with Stills performing a brief vocal solo between the second and third.

This is followed by Stills' acoustic guitar solo, beginning the next section.

The third section features poetic lyrics ("chestnut brown canary, ruby-throated sparrow"). Each of the three phrases is initially sung by Stills, with Nash then joining, and finally Crosby. Connecting the phrases are instrumental breaks performed by Stills on acoustic guitar. There is a conga‑type sound at the end of the song that was attained by beating the back of his Martin guitar.

The final section is sung in Spanish, with "doo-doo-doo-doo-doo" backing vocals until the song concludes. Stills has said that he intentionally made the final stanzas unexpected and difficult, even using a foreign language for the lyrics, "just to make sure nobody would understand it".

== Live performances ==
The final section of the song is included on the CSNY live album 4 Way Street. It fades in on the opening of side one of the album. CSN also performed "Suite: Judy Blue Eyes" as their opening song at the Woodstock and Live Aid festivals, and their performance at the former is featured in the film Woodstock (1970). The album Live at Fillmore East, 1969, released in 2024, opens with an acoustic version of the song.

== Critical reception ==
Writing for The New York Times in 1969, Robert Christgau suggested that while "Stills has become such a sophisticated guitarist that many of his lines lack any straight-on rhythmic compulsion", his "Suite: Judy Blue Eyes" is "a structural triumph which could never have been brought off by a more Dionysiac spirit."

"Suite: Judy Blue Eyes" was named the 51st greatest song ever in a 2000 list by VH1. In 2004, Rolling Stone magazine ranked it number 418 in the 500 Greatest Songs of All Time. It was also included in the Rock and Roll Hall of Fame's "500 Songs That Shaped Rock & Roll".

"I love the intricacies of the harmonies and Stills's guitar work," remarked Slipknot front-man Corey Taylor. "This is a favourite."

== Legacy ==
The song "Mission Statement" by "Weird Al" Yankovic is a style pastiche of "Suite: Judy Blue Eyes". Its lyrics are corporate buzzwords strung together in such a way as to be ultimately nonsensical.

The final section of "Suite:Judy Blue Eyes" has been parodied numerous other times, notably in Frank Zappa's compositions "Billy the Mountain" and "Magdalena" on The Mothers of Invention's album Just Another Band From L.A. It is also sampled in the 2010 Cypress Hill song "Armada Latina".

In June 2026, CBS News included the song in its list of the 250 essential American songs of the past 250 years.

== Personnel ==
According to the liner notes of CSN:

- David Crosby – vocals
- Stephen Stills – vocals, guitar, organ, bass, percussion
- Graham Nash – vocals
- Dallas Taylor – drums

== Charts ==
Chart (1969–71)	Peak position
Canada 100 (RPM)	11
Netherlands (Single Top 100)	30
US Hot 100 (Billboard)	21
US Cash Box Top 100	15
U.S. Record World Top 100	18
