= Carry On (Crosby, Stills, Nash & Young song) =

Single by Crosby, Stills, Nash & Young

from the album Déjà Vu
- A-side: "Teach Your Children"
- Released: September 1970
- Recorded: November 5, 1969
- Genre: Folk rock, psychedelic rock
- Length: 4:26 (album version); 3:16 (radio edit)
- Label: Atlantic
- Songwriter: Stephen Stills
- Producer: Crosby, Stills, Nash & Young

Crosby, Stills, Nash & Young singles chronology
"Ohio" (1970)	"Carry On" (1970)	"Just a Song Before I Go" (1977)

"Carry On" is a song by American folk rock band Crosby, Stills, Nash & Young. Written by Stephen Stills, it is the opening track to their second album Déjà Vu (1970). It was released as the B-side of "Teach Your Children", but went on to receive steady airplay of its own from AOR radio stations.

== Background ==
When nearing the end of the recording sessions for Déjà Vu, Graham Nash told Stephen Stills that they still didn't have an opening track. Many recording acts or producers prefer to start an album with a particularly catchy song, in order to set the mood and encourage listeners who are checking it out for the first time. Stills took two songs — (one being the song "Questions" he'd written for and recorded with Buffalo Springfield), and edited them together with parts of a jam session from a few days earlier, to produce one finished piece.

The song is noted for the bridge section that makes a transition from a faster to slower tempo, with the lyric lines sung in a capella.

Session drummer Dallas Taylor:

The song was written in the middle of the Deja Vu sessions, when Nash told Stephen they still didn't have an opener for the album. It was something of a message to the group, since it had become a real struggle to keep the band together at that point. Stephen combined two unfinished songs and stuck them onto a jam we'd had out in the studio a few nights before, me on drums and Stephen on a Hammond B-3 organ.

The song was also an inspiration for Led Zeppelin, whose track "Friends" on Led Zeppelin III is generally seen as being inspired by it, including a similar slack-stringed C-tuned acoustic opening. However, this has not been verified. There are many key differences between both songs. The two tracks were released within one month of each other, which further clouds any insinuation that one was directly influenced by the other.

== Personnel ==
=== CSN ===
- Stephen Stills – lead vocals, harmony vocals, acoustic guitar, electric guitar, organ, bass guitar, percussion
- David Crosby – harmony vocals
- Graham Nash – harmony vocals

=== Additional Personnel ===
- Dallas Taylor – drums
