= Guinnevere =

Song of Crosby, Stills & Nash

Song by Crosby, Stills & Nash

from the album Crosby, Stills & Nash
- Written: 1968
- Released: May 29, 1969
- Recorded: 1969
- Studio: Wally Heider, Hollywood
- Genre: Psychedelic folk; progressive folk
- Length: 4:39
- Label: Atlantic
- Songwriter: David Crosby
- Producers: David Crosby; Graham Nash; Stephen Stills

"Guinnevere" is a song written by David Crosby in 1968. The song appeared on Crosby, Stills & Nash's critically acclaimed 1969 eponymous debut album. The song is notable for its complex melody and lyrics, which compare Queen Guinevere to the object of the singer's affection, referred to as "m'lady".

== Composition ==
In a Rolling Stone interview, Crosby remarked that "Guinnevere" is "a very unusual song, it's in a very strange tuning (EBDGAD) with strange time signatures. It's about three women that I loved. One of whom was Christine Hinton - the girl who got killed who was my girlfriend - and one of whom was Joni Mitchell, and the other one is somebody that I can't tell. It might be my best song." Additionally, according to Robert Christgau, the song is based on a three-note motif from the 1960 Miles Davis album Sketches of Spain.

The album CSN (box set) contains a demo version of the song played by Crosby on guitar, Jack Casady of Jefferson Airplane on bass, and Cyrus Faryar of Modern Folk Quartet on bouzouki. In the liner notes, Crosby says of the song: "When all my friends were listening to Elvis and 1950s rock 'n' roll, I was listening to Chet Baker, Gerry Mulligan and West Coast jazz. Later I got involved with the folk music scene. After getting kicked out of the Byrds I didn't have a plan, but I went back to my roots, and "Guinnevere" is a combination of these two influences."

== Lyrical themes ==
"Guinnevere" deploys the figure of Queen Guinevere; Crosby writes about her from the perspective of Sir Lancelot of ancient Welsh lore. The subject of "Guinnevere" has been speculated as referring, alongside the three women Crosby described, to Nancy Ross who lived with him and, according to author David McGowan, did indeed draw pentagrams on walls. She left Crosby in 1966 for Gram Parsons, the grandson of a citrus fruit magnate; this has additionally been taken as an explanation for the choice of "an orange tree" in the song's lyrics. The song also deals with the importance of freedom; it features the pronounced refrain "we shall be free".

== Personnel ==
- David Crosby – lead vocals, harmony vocals, acoustic and electric guitars
- Graham Nash – lead vocals, harmony vocals

== Cover versions ==
Miles Davis recorded a version of the song with his electric-era band during a January 27, 1970 session. It was first released, in edited form, on the 1979 compilation Circle in the Round, with a longer version eventually appearing on the 1998 release of The Complete Bitches Brew Sessions. According to David Crosby's 2016 podcast interview with Marc Maron, Davis played it for Crosby at the former's home before releasing it. He did not recognize any resemblance between Davis' version and his original composition, and was bemused; Davis did not take kindly to this, and kicked him out of his house. In late 2017, Crosby tweeted that he changed his mind about Miles' recording: "Finally ....after so many years of not getting it ....I listened to Miles and his band doing Guinnevere....and got it..."
