= Our House (Crosby, Stills, Nash & Young song) =

Single by Crosby, Stills, Nash & Young

from the album Déjà Vu
- B-side: "Deja Vu"
- Released: September 1970
- Recorded: November 5, 1969
- Genre: Baroque pop, soft rock, folk rock
- Length: 2:59
- Label: Atlantic
- Songwriter: Graham Nash
- Producer: Crosby, Stills, Nash & Young

Crosby, Stills, Nash & Young singles chronology
"Ohio" (1970)	"Our House" (1970)	"Just a Song Before I Go" (1977)

Music video
- "Our House" on YouTube

"Our House" is a song written by British singer-songwriter Graham Nash and recorded by Crosby, Stills, Nash & Young on their album Déjà Vu (1970). The single reached No. 30 on the U.S. Billboard Hot 100 and No. 20 on the Cash Box Top 100. The song, "an ode to countercultural domestic bliss", was written while Nash was living with Joni Mitchell, recording both Crosby, Stills & Nash and Déjà Vu.

== Origins ==
The song originated from a domestic event that took place while Graham Nash was living with Joni Mitchell in her house in Laurel Canyon, Los Angeles. They had gone out for breakfast and afterwards bought an inexpensive vase at an antiques shop on Ventura Boulevard. Nash wrote the song in an hour, on Mitchell's piano.

In October 2013, in an interview with Terry Gross on NPR's Fresh Air, Nash explained how he was inspired by “an ordinary moment” and wrote lyrics from everyday events like by Mitchell gathering flowers from the yard to arrange in the vase.

In the same interview, Nash explained how the group’s celebrated vocal harmonies were an unlikely blend of their own styles: asked about the vocal harmonies in the song:

[David] Crosby is one of the most unique musicians I know, and Stephen Stills has got this blues-based, South American kind of feeling to his music. And I'm this, you know, Henry VIII guy from England ... You know, it's not supposed to work, but it does, somehow.

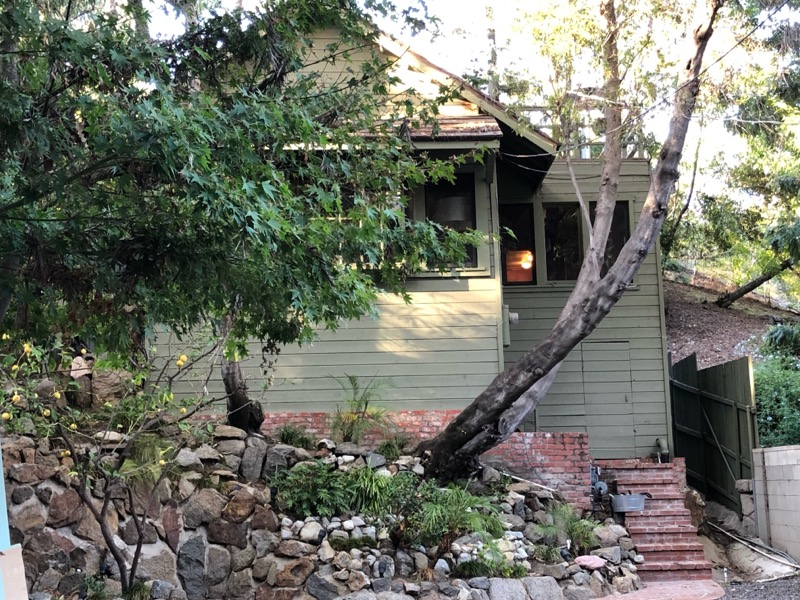
Laurel Canyon, 8217 Lookout Mountain Avenue, Joni Mitchell's house from 1969 to 1974; photograph taken in 2022

== Reception ==
Cash Box described the song as "a jewellike ballad that spotlights the quartet's vocal quality by nearly absenting rhythmic impetus" and highlighted the song's "crystalline performance." Record World called it CSN&Y's "next logical hit."

== Music video ==
Directed and animated by Jeff Scher, an official music video for this song was published on CSNY's official YouTube channel on June 9, 2021.

== Legacy and adaptations ==
Graham Nash once admitted he was "bored with 'Our House' the day after [he] recorded it", but will play it occasionally "because it does mean so much to so many people". Critics praised the song praised for its "innocent elegance" however, reviewer Barney Hoskyns called it a "trite ditty" and wondered what Neil Young, whose protest song "Ohio" (about the Kent State Massacre) was recorded and released by CSNY in June 1970, would have thought of it: "the journey from 'Ohio' back to 'Our House' seemed to sum up a general failure of nerve in the LA music scene".

The song has been covered by a number of artists, including Helen Reddy, The Onyx, Phantom Planet, Sheena Easton, Kidsongs, Farewell Continental and Sharon, Lois & Bram.

It was used as a commercial jingle for Eckrich sausage in the 1980s and for Sears Kenmore appliance advertisements in 1989. “Our House” has appeared in various television shows and films. It was also used in an advert for Halifax Building Society in the 1990s.

Dan Aykroyd sings along to the song while cleaning the house in one of the opening scenes of the 1994 film My Girl 2. A portion of the song's lyrics was spoken in The Simpsons episode "Bart After Dark" by Reverend Lovejoy, as well as played in the episode "Milhouse of Sand and Fog", while Milhouse is daydreaming. It appears in the 1996 Only Fools and Horses Christmas special, "Time on Our Hands", watched by 24.3 million viewers in the United Kingdom. The song was featured in the fifth season of How I Met Your Mother in an episode called "Home Wreckers". It appeared as a cover in a Target commercial from 2013, for its "Threshold" brand for house and home. It was the closing song on The Blacklist episode "Marvin Gerard", aired in 2015. An episode of Cheers titled "Dinner at Eight-ish" had Frasier Crane and Lilith singing it in honor of their new apartment, only to stop very abruptly when Diane chimed in. In the fourth season of This is Us, Rebecca, in parallel scenes with her husband Jack and her son Kevin, visits the old home of Joni Mitchell in Los Angeles and relays the story of how "Our House" came to be a song. Rebecca, played by Mandy Moore, and Jack, played by Milo Ventimiglia sing a portion of the song. The song was used in the first trailer for Barbarian. The demo version of the song was used in the end credits of The Invite.

Nash performs the song on the album Joni 75: A Birthday Celebration, a recording of a tribute concert by several artists to celebrate Mitchell's 75th birthday, released on Decca in March 2019.

Coco & Clair Clair recorded a breakbeat cover of the song for their album Girl.

Apple used a solo female vocal and acoustic guitar version of the song in its 2024 "Heartstrings" holiday campaign video ad featuring a new hearing aid feature in its AirPods Pro 2.

== Charts ==
=== Weekly charts ===
Chart (1970)	Peak position
Australia (Kent Music Report)	51
Canada RPM Top Singles	13
Netherlands	9
New Zealand (Listener)	19
U.S. Billboard Hot 100	30
U.S. Billboard Adult Contemporary	20
U.S. Cash Box Top 100	20
U.S. Record World Top 100	20

=== Year-end charts ===
Chart (1970)	Rank
U.S. (Joel Whitburn's Pop Annual)	196

== Certifications ==
Region	Certification	Certified units/sales
United Kingdom (BPI)	Silver	200,000^{‡}
^{‡} Sales+streaming figures based on certification alone.

== Personnel ==
- Graham Nash – lead & harmony vocals, piano, harpsichord
- David Crosby – harmony vocals
- Stephen Stills – harmony vocals
- Dallas Taylor – drums
- Greg Reeves – bass
