= Marrakesh Express =

- West German picture sleeve

Single by Crosby, Stills & Nash

from the album Crosby, Stills & Nash
- B-side: "Helplessly Hoping"
- Released: July 1969
- Recorded: 1969
- Studio: Wally Heider, Hollywood
- Genre: Pop
- Length: 2:38
- Label: Atlantic
- Songwriter: Graham Nash
- Producers: David Crosby; Graham Nash; Stephen Stills

Crosby, Stills & Nash singles chronology
"Marrakesh Express" (1969)	"Suite: Judy Blue Eyes" (1969)

Audio sample
- "Marrakesh Express": file; help

"Marrakesh Express" is a song written by Graham Nash and performed by the band Crosby, Stills and Nash (CSN). It was first released in May 1969 on the self-titled album, Crosby, Stills and Nash, and released on a 45-RPM single in July of the same year, with another CSN song, "Helplessly Hoping", as its backing side. The single reached No. 28 on the Billboard Hot 100 on August 23, 1969. It reached the same position on the Easy Listening chart. The song was best received in the UK and Canada, reaching No. 17 in both nations. As a trio or quartet, this remains their only single to make the UK top 40 chart.

== Composition ==
"Marrakesh Express" was written and composed by Graham Nash during his final years as a member of the English rock band the Hollies, of which he was a member from its formation in 1962 until 1968. The band rejected the song as not commercial enough, but it found a home with Nash's new band Crosby, Stills and Nash.

Nash recalled his inspiration for the song occurring during a Moroccan vacation he took in 1966. On the trip, Nash travelled by train from Casablanca to Marrakesh. He began the journey in First Class, surrounded by people he found to be uninteresting—as he described it, they were all "ladies with blue hair." He decided the compartment was "completely fucking boring," so left his seat to explore the other train carriages, and was fascinated by what he saw.

The song mentions "ducks and pigs and chickens," which he saw on the train, and recalled the ride by commenting: "It's literally the song as it is—what happened to me."

== Musical structure ==
The instrumentation of the song seeks to embody Nash's lyrics through an Eastern vibe and a "buoyant" flow carried by Jim Gordon's drumming, to resemble a train ride. Stephen Stills was responsible for much of the creative musicianship, adding a distinctive, unique sounding riff played on two overdubbed electric guitars. He also added Hammond B3 organ, piano and bass. The song was rounded out by Nash's acoustic guitar, and the group's trademark three-part vocal harmony on the choruses.

== At Woodstock ==
The second public appearance of "Marrakesh Express" was at the Woodstock Music Festival. Between 3 AM and 4 AM on August 18, 1969, Crosby, Stills, Nash & Young came together as a band for the second time in public and performed a set that included what Graham Nash called "a medley of our hit," referring to this song, the first single from their debut album.

== Reception and current appeal ==
The song has gained attention throughout the years and has remained popular since its release in 1969. Throughout the decades of touring done by Crosby, Stills and Nash, and the sometimes Crosby, Stills, Nash and Young, "Marrakesh Express" is the ninth most-played song by them, and has been performed over 450 times.

A Crosby, Stills, Nash and Young tribute band is named "Marrakesh Express: A Crosby, Stills, Nash and Young Experience."

Record World said it was "one of the merriest sides from the album ."

In a 2003 Rolling Stone article, Iggy Pop mentions the song in response to a discussion of the Stooges’ creation acting as a counter against the "hippie movement”. He exclaims, "I mean, 'Marrakesh Express?' It may be the worst song ever written."

== Chart history ==
Chart (1969)	Peak position
Canada RPM Adult Contemporary	23
Canada RPM Top Singles	17
UK Singles (OCC)	17
US Billboard Hot 100	28
US Billboard Easy Listening	28
US Cash Box Top 100	19
U.S. Record World Top 100	17

== Cover versions ==
In 2012, the song was recorded by the band The Gypsy Queens for their eponymous album The Gypsy Queens, featuring Nash himself and produced by Larry Klein. It was recorded at Jim Henson Studios in Los Angeles. The album reached #46 in the English charts. Stan Getz also recorded a version.

== See also ==
- List of train songs
