= Crosby, Stills & Nash (album) =

Studio album by Crosby, Stills & Nash
- Released: May 29, 1969
- Recorded: February–March 1969
- Studios: Wally Heider, Hollywood
- Genre: Folk rock
- Length: 40:47
- Label: Atlantic
- Producer: Crosby, Stills & Nash

Crosby, Stills & Nash chronology
| Crosby, Stills & Nash (1969) | Déjà Vu (1970) |

Singles from Crosby, Stills & Nash
- 1. "Marrakesh Express" Released: July 1969; 2. "Suite: Judy Blue Eyes" Released: September 1969

Crosby, Stills & Nash is the debut studio album by the folk rock supergroup Crosby, Stills & Nash (CSN), released on May 29, 1969, by Atlantic Records. It is the only release by the band prior to adding Neil Young to their lineup. The album spawned two Top 40 singles, "Marrakesh Express" and "Suite: Judy Blue Eyes", which peaked respectively at No. 28 during the week of August 23, 1969, and at No. 21 during the week of December 6, 1969, on the US Billboard Hot 100. The album itself peaked at No. 6 on the US Billboard Top Pop Albums chart. It has been certified four times platinum by the RIAA for sales of 4 million.

The album has been issued on compact disc three times, mastered first by Barry Diament at Atlantic Studios in the mid-1980s; and remastered by Joe Gastwirt at Ocean View Digital and reissued on August 16, 1994. The album was reissued again by Rhino Records in an expanded edition using the HDCD process on January 24, 2006. On December 6, 2011, a Gold Compact Disc edition of the album was released on the Audio Fidelity label.

== Background and recording ==
This was one of those times where everything clicked. I don't want to sound cosmic or anything, but it's almost like there was a greater force at work, and I don't just mean Ahmet Ertegun. The degree to which this all fell together was so astoundingly high you almost feel someone -- or something -- wanted it to happen. Granted, all three of us were talented guys, but we also knew our combination was somehow blessed. The three of us have different voices. We have different accents. We have different attitudes. We are very different people. But the thing that happens when you put those three voices together is just amazing. As soon as we started singing together, we knew we were into some brand-new, wonderful terra incognita. There was some magic there, and you can hear that magic all over our first album.

— David Crosby, as quoted from the liner notes of Crosby, Stills & Nash

Stills dominated the recording of the album. Crosby and Nash played guitar on their own songs, while drummer Dallas Taylor played on most tracks (session drummer Jim Gordon performed in his stead on "Marrakesh Express"). Stills played all the bass, organ, and lead guitar parts, as well as acoustic guitar on his own songs. "The other guys won't be offended when I say that one was my baby, and I kind of had the tracks in my head," Stills said. Even with this dominance, Stills does not appear on the tracks "Guinnevere" and "Lady of the Island", both featuring Crosby and Nash only and a precursor to their partnership on record and stage during the 1970s.

David Crosby bristled over the plan for "Long Time Gone" as he thought he should at least play rhythm guitar on his own song. Stills persuaded him to go home for a while and when he returned Crosby was won over by the music track that Stills and Taylor had recorded. In a more recent interview, Crosby contradicted his earlier statement, stating that he had played guitar on the track. He is so credited in the liner notes to the 1991 box set.

The group performed songs from the album at the Woodstock festival in August 1969. In late 1969 the group appeared with Neil Young on the Tom Jones' TV show and performed "Long Time Gone" with Tom Jones sharing vocals.

== Composition and music ==
"In many ways, the album helped define the California sound," Matt Friedlander wrote. "The songs blended folk, country and rock influences and featured poetic lyrics about relationships and then-current social and political issues." Crosby, Stills & Nash combined the musicians' voices and other strengths; David Crosby's social commentary and atmospheric mood pieces, Stephen Stills' diverse musical skills and capacity to fold folk and country elements subtly into complex rock structures, and Graham Nash's radio-friendly pop melodies. The album features some of their best known songs, including "Helplessly Hoping", "Long Time Gone", "Suite: Judy Blue Eyes", and "Wooden Ships", a collaboration between Crosby and Stills as well as Paul Kantner of Jefferson Airplane.

== Artwork ==
On the album cover the members appear from left to right as Nash, Stills, and Crosby, the inverse of the roll call in the album's title. The photo was taken by their friend and photographer Henry Diltz before they came up with a name for the group. They found an abandoned house with an old battered sofa outside, located at 815 Palm Avenue, West Hollywood, that they thought would be a perfect fit for their image. A few days later the band decided on the name "Crosby, Stills, and Nash". To prevent confusion, they went back to the house a day or so later to re-shoot the cover in the correct order, but when they got there they found the house had been demolished.

Dallas Taylor appears looking through the window of the door on the rear of the sleeve. In the expanded edition, however, he is absent. The original vinyl LP was released in a gatefold sleeve that depicted the band members in large fur parkas with a sunset in the background on the gatefold (shot in Big Bear, California). A long folded page inside displayed the album credits, lyrics, track listing, and a quasi-psychedelic pencil drawing.

== Critical reception ==
Professional ratings
Review scores
| Source | Rating |
|---|---|
| AllMusic | 5/5 stars |
| The Rolling Stone Album Guide | 4/5 stars |
| The Village Voice | B+ |
| Encyclopedia of Popular Music | 5/5 stars |

In a contemporary review, Rolling Stone critic Barry Franklin called Crosby, Stills & Nash "an eminently playable record" and "especially satisfying work", finding the songwriting and vocal harmonies particularly exceptional. Robert Christgau was less enthusiastic in The New York Times, writing that "[Crosby, Stills & Nash] is as perfect as has been expected. But it also demonstrates the dangers of perfection: the wildness that should liberate great rock is so well-controlled that when it appears (as on Nash's excellent 'Pre-Road Downs') it seems to have been inserted just to prove the music is rock: the only exception is Crosby's wailing vocal on 'Long Time Gone.'" In his capsule-review column for The Village Voice, he jokingly said the vocal saves the album from "a special castrati award".

In a retrospective review, Jason Ankeny of AllMusic believed some of the songs' themes "haven't dated well" but "the harmonies are absolutely timeless, and the best material remains rock-solid". In 2003, Rolling Stone ranked Crosby, Stills & Nash number 259 on their list of The 500 Greatest Albums of All Time, then was re-ranked 262nd in 2012. It was voted number 83 in Colin Larkin's All Time Top 1000 Albums 3rd Edition (2000).

Jefferson Airplane guitarist Paul Kantner was finally credited as co-composer of "Wooden Ships" on the expanded edition reissue, something long acknowledged on his group's version of the song from their Volunteers album, released the same year. David Crosby singing an excerpt of "Come On in My Kitchen" between "Long Time Gone" and "49 Bye-Byes" was left off the 2006 expanded reissue at the request of the late Robert Johnson's estate.

== Legacy ==
The album proved very influential on many levels to the dominant popular music scene in America for much of the 1970s. The success of the album generated respect for the group within the industry and galvanized interest in signing similar acts, many of whom came under management and representation by the CSN team of Elliot Roberts and David Geffen. Strong sales, combined with the group's emphasis on personal confession in its writing, paved the way for the success of the singer-songwriter movement of the early 1970s. Their use of personal events in their material without resorting to subterfuge, their talents in vocal harmony, their cultivation of painstaking studio craft, as well as the Laurel Canyon ethos that surrounded the group and their associates, established an aesthetic for a number of acts that came to define the "California sound" of the ensuing decade, including Eagles, Jackson Browne, post-1974 Fleetwood Mac, and others.

In the album's liner notes, Crosby is quoted by music critic David Wild, saying: "For whatever reasons, I think you get very few records like that [in] life, which you can put on 20 years later and they still hold up. To this day, that first album comes on, and you don't want to take it off or skip a tune. That's the ultimate test. You just want to let it run. You might even want to turn it up."

In 1999, the album Crosby, Stills & Nash was inducted into the Grammy Hall of Fame.

=== Grammy awards ===
| Year | Nominee / work | Award | Result |
|---|---|---|---|
| 1970 | Crosby, Stills & Nash (performer) | Best New Artist | Won |

== Track listing ==
Side one
| No. | Title | Writer(s) | Lead vocals | Length |
|---|---|---|---|---|
| 1. | "Suite: Judy Blue Eyes" | Stephen Stills | Stills | 7:25 |
| 2. | "Marrakesh Express" | Graham Nash | Nash | 2:39 |
| 3. | "Guinnevere" | David Crosby | Crosby with Nash | 4:40 |
| 4. | "You Don't Have to Cry" | Stills | Stills with Crosby & Nash | 2:45 |
| 5. | "Pre-Road Downs" | Nash | Nash | 2:56 |
| Total length: | | | | 20:25 |

Side two
| No. | Title | Writer(s) | Lead vocals | Length |
|---|---|---|---|---|
| 1. | "Wooden Ships" | Crosby; Paul Kantner; Stills | Crosby and Stills | 5:29 |
| 2. | "Lady of the Island" | Nash | Nash | 2:39 |
| 3. | "Helplessly Hoping" | Stills | Stills with Crosby & Nash | 2:41 |
| 4. | "Long Time Gone" | Crosby | Crosby | 4:17 |
| 5. | "49 Bye-Byes" | Stills | Stills | 5:16 |
| Total length: | | | | 20:22 |

2006 bonus tracks
| No. | Title | Writer(s) | Lead vocals | Length |
|---|---|---|---|---|
| 11. | "Do for the Others" (demo) | Stills | Stills and Nash | 2:49 |
| 12. | "Song with No Words (Tree with No Leaves)" | Crosby | Crosby and Nash | 3:18 |
| 13. | "Everybody's Talkin'" | Fred Neil | Stills with Crosby & Nash | 3:14 |
| 14. | "Teach Your Children" (demo) | Nash | Nash and Crosby | 3:14 |
| Total length: | | | | 12:35 |

== Personnel ==
- David Crosby – vocals; guitar on "Guinnevere"; rhythm guitar on "Wooden Ships" and "Long Time Gone"
- Stephen Stills – vocals, lead guitar, organ, bass, percussion all tracks except "Guinnevere" and "Lady of the Island"
- Graham Nash – vocals; rhythm guitar on "Marrakesh Express" and "Pre-Road Downs"; acoustic guitar on "Lady of the Island"

=== Additional personnel ===
- Dallas Taylor – drums on "Suite: Judy Blue Eyes," "Pre-Road Downs," "Wooden Ships," "Long Time Gone," and "49 Bye-Byes"
- Jim Gordon – drums on "Marrakesh Express"
- Cass Elliot – backing vocals on "Pre-Road Downs"

=== Production ===
- Crosby, Stills & Nash – producer
- Bill Halverson – engineer
- Gary Burden – art direction, design
- Henry Diltz – photography
- David Geffen – direction
- Ahmet Ertegün – spiritual guidance
- Barry Diament – mastering, initial compact disc issue
- Joe Gastwirt – mastering, 1994 compact disc reissue
- Raymond Foye – liner notes, 2006 reissue

== Charts ==
Chart performance for Crosby, Stills & Nash
| Chart (1969) | Peak position |
|---|---|
| Australian Go-Set Top 20 Albums | 10 |
| Canadian RPM 100 Albums | 2 |
| Dutch MegaCharts Albums | 2 |
| Spanish Albums | 4 |
| Finnish Album Charts | 7 |
| UK Albums Chart | 25 |
| US Billboard 200 | 6 |
| US Billboard Black Albums | 35 |
| US Cash Box Top 100 Albums | 6 |
| US Record World Album Chart | 5 |

| Chart (2019) | Peak position |
|---|---|
| Hungarian Albums Chart | 33 |

Year-end charts

| Chart (1969) | Position |
|---|---|
| US Cash Box Year-End | 17 |
| US Record World Year-End | 10 |
| Chart (1970) | Position |
| US Billboard Year End | 19 |
| US Cash Box Year-End | 53 |

Singles

| Year | Single | Chart | Position |
|---|---|---|---|
| 1969 | "Marrakesh Express" | US Billboard Hot 100 | 28 |
| 1969 | "Marrakesh Express" | US Billboard Adult Contemporary | 28 |
| 1969 | "Marrakesh Express" | Canada RPM Singles | 17 |
| 1969 | "Marrakesh Express" | Spanish Singles Charts | 22 |
| 1969 | "Marrakesh Express" | UK Singles Charts | 17 |
| 1969 | "Marrakesh Express" | US Cashbox Singles Charts | 19 |
| 1969 | "Marrakesh Express" | US Record World Charts | 17 |
| 1969 | "Suite: Judy Blue Eyes" | US Billboard Hot 100 | 21 |
| 1969 | "Suite: Judy Blue Eyes" | US Billboard Adult Contemporary | 10 |
| 1969 | "Suite: Judy Blue Eyes" | US Cashbox Singles Charts | 15 |
| 1969 | "Suite: Judy Blue Eyes" | US Record World Charts | 18 |
| 1969 | "Suite: Judy Blue Eyes" | Australian Singles Charts | 50 |
| 1969 | "Suite: Judy Blue Eyes" | Canada RPM Singles | 11 |
| 1969 | "Suite: Judy Blue Eyes" | Dutch Singles Charts | 30 |

== Certifications ==
| Region | Certification | Certified units/sales |
|---|---|---|
| Australia (ARIA) | Platinum | 70,000^{^} |
| France (SNEP) | Gold | 100,000^{*} |
| United Kingdom (BPI) | Gold | 100,000^{^} |
| United States (RIAA) | 4× Platinum | 4,000,000^{^} |
^{*}sales figures based on certification alone^{^}shipments figures based on certification alone
