= Wooden Ships =

1969 song by Crosby, Stills & Nash and Jefferson Airplane

Song by Crosby, Stills & Nash

from the album Crosby, Stills & Nash
- Released: May 29, 1969
- Recorded: February 20, 1969
- Studio: Wally Heider, Hollywood
- Genre: Folk rock; psychedelic rock
- Length: 5:29
- Label: Atlantic
- Songwriters: David Crosby; Paul Kantner; Stephen Stills
- Producers: David Crosby; Graham Nash; Stephen Stills

Audio
- "Wooden Ships" (2005 remaster) on YouTube

"Wooden Ships"

Song by Jefferson Airplane

from the album Volunteers
- Released: November 1969
- Recorded: April 14 & 22, 1969
- Studio: Wally Heider, San Francisco
- Genre: Psychedelic rock
- Length: 6:24
- Label: RCA
- Composer: David Crosby
- Lyricists: Paul Kantner; Stephen Stills
- Producer: Al Schmitt

Audio
- "Wooden Ships" on YouTube

"Wooden Ships" is a song written and composed by David Crosby, Paul Kantner, and Stephen Stills and recorded both by Crosby, Stills & Nash and by Kantner with Jefferson Airplane. It was written and composed in 1968 in Fort Lauderdale, Florida, on a boat named Mayan, owned by Crosby, who composed the music, while Kantner and Stills wrote most of the lyrics.

== Background ==
Kantner could not be credited as one of the joint authors-composers of "Wooden Ships" on the original May 1969 release of Crosby, Stills & Nash, because he was embroiled in legal disputes with Jefferson Airplane's then manager, Matthew Katz. Crosby said, "Paul called me up and said that he was having this major duke-out with this horrible guy who was managing the band, and he was freezing everything their names were on. 'He might injunct the release of your record,' he told me. So we didn't put Paul's name on it for a while. In later versions, we made it very certain that he wrote it with us. Of course, we evened things up with him with a whole mess of cash when the record went huge."

The song was also released by Kantner's band Jefferson Airplane in November 1969 on the album Volunteers. The two versions differ slightly in lyrics and melody.

Crosby recorded a solo demo in March 1968 with the melody but no lyrics. Stills recorded his own demo the following month with most of the lyrics in place. This demo was subsequently released in 2007 on Stills' Just Roll Tape album.

Both Jefferson Airplane and Crosby, Stills, Nash & Young performed the song in their sets at the 1969 Woodstock Festival. However, the CSNY performance is better-known, as it was included in the film and first album from the festival. The film's soundtrack uses the studio album version, while the soundtrack album has the live performance. Jefferson Airplane's performance – which ran to over 21 minutes in length and included several extended jam sections – remained unreleased until the 2009 Woodstock Experience set.

=== Meaning ===
"Wooden Ships" was written at the height of the Vietnam War, a time of great tension between the United States and the Soviet Union, nuclear-armed rivals in the Cold War. It has been likened to Tom Lehrer's "We Will All Go Together When We Go" and Barry McGuire's "Eve of Destruction," in that it describes the consequences of an apocalyptic nuclear war. According to the liner notes, the writers "imagined ourselves as the few survivors, escaping on a boat to create a new civilization." This represents one of Kantner's recurring themes, to which he would return again in the 1970 concept album Blows Against the Empire.

The words of the song depict the horrors confronting the survivors of a nuclear holocaust in which the two sides have annihilated each other. A person from one side stumbles upon a person from the other side and asks, "Can you tell me, please, who won?" The question is left unanswered. To stay alive, they share "purple berries", as a result of which they "haven't got sick once". The lyrics beg "silver people on the shoreline," described by David Crosby as "guys in radiation suits," to "let us be." As the wooden ships, devoid of metal that would become radioactive from neutron activation, are carrying the survivors away from the shores, radiation poisoning kills those who have not made it aboard. That grim tableau is described thus:

Horror grips us as we watch you die
All we can do is echo your anguished cries
Stare as all human feelings die
We are leaving you don't need us

It is also described in an (unsung) prelude, included in the lyric sheet:

Black sails knifing through the pitchblende night
Away from the radioactive landmass madness
From the silver-suited people searching out
Uncontaminated food and shelter on the shores
No glowing metal on our ship of wood
Only free happy crazy people naked in the universe

== Reception ==
Ultimate Classic Rock critic Michael Gallucci rated it Jefferson Airplane's 5th best song, claiming that it is better than the Crosby, Stills and Nash version because it "better captures the melancholic dread facing the few survivors of a nuclear war in this Vietnam-era classic."

== In popular culture ==
The song is alluded to in Neil Young's 1986 song "Hippie Dream" from the album Landing on Water, in the refrain "The wooden ships/were just a hippie dream" which is later altered to "The wooden ships are a hippie dream/capsized in excess/if you know what I mean".

In 1975, Mike Friedrich and Steve Leialoha adapted the song into graphic format for issue #3 of the alternative Science-fiction and Fantasy magazine Star*Reach.

Jackson Browne later asked Crosby, "What about the guys who can't escape?", referring to those left behind after the wooden ships set sail. Crosby reportedly said, "Well, fuck 'em," and Browne, taken aback by Crosby's answer (which Crosby later regretted), wrote his 1973 song "For Everyman" in response.

== Personnel ==
=== Crosby, Stills & Nash version ===
- David Crosby – lead vocals, harmony vocals, electric rhythm guitar
- Stephen Stills – lead vocals, harmony vocals, electric lead guitar, Hammond organ, bass guitar, percussion
- Graham Nash – harmony vocals

Featuring

- Dallas Taylor – drums

=== Jefferson Airplane version ===
- Grace Slick – co-lead vocals and harmony vocals
- Paul Kantner – co-lead vocals, harmony vocals and rhythm guitar
- Marty Balin – co-lead vocals and harmony vocals
- Jorma Kaukonen – lead guitar
- Jack Casady – bass guitar
- Spencer Dryden – drums

Featuring

- Nicky Hopkins – piano
- David Crosby – sailboat

== See also ==
- List of anti-war songs
