= Still Stills: The Best of Stephen Stills =

Compilation album by Stephen Stills
- Released: December 2, 1976
- Genre: Rock
- Length: 35:50
- Label: Atlantic
- Producer: Stephen Stills, Bill Halverson, Chris Hillman, Dallas Taylor

Stephen Stills chronology
Long May You Run (1976)	Still Stills: The Best of Stephen Stills (1976)	Thoroughfare Gap (1978)

Still Stills: The Best of Stephen Stills is a compilation album of Stephen Stills, released on December 2, 1976 on Atlantic Records. Made up of songs from his first four Atlantic albums, including the two Manassas albums, it peaked at number 127 on the US charts, and increased Stills critical standing slightly. It was assembled without input from Stills himself, and is currently out of print.

== Content ==
This best-of album was a contractual fulfilment from his old record label Atlantic Records, after signing to Columbia Records in 1975, to capitalise on the commercial success of his reunion with Neil Young and the album Long May You Run from three months before. The album contains songs only released from his first two solo records, Stephen Stills and Stephen Stills 2, and from his two albums recorded with his band Manassas, Manassas and Down the Road. All songs included were released from 1970 to 1973, and this compilation has not been reissued on compact disc.

== Reception ==
Professional ratings
Review scores
Source	Rating
Sounds	3/5 stars

Billboard said the set didn't feature Stills' most powerful and lasting work composed during his Buffalo Springfield and CSNY days, and said many of the tunes lack the substance and force that characterised his earlier work. Cash Box called the album a good reference for programmers and christmas sales, but featured a few singles that were overlooked on initial release.

== Track listing ==
All tracks are written by Stephen Stills except where noted.

Side one
No.	Title	Writer(s)	Length
1.	"Love the One You're With"		3:03
2.	"It Doesn't Matter"	Stills, Chris Hillman	2:30
3.	"We Are Not Helpless"		4:17
4.	"Marianne"		2:27
5.	"Bound to Fall"	Mike Brewer, Tom Mastin	1:57
6.	"Isn't It About Time"		3:02

Side two
No.	Title	Writer(s)	Length
1.	"Change Partners"		3:13
2.	"Go Back Home"		5:56
3.	"Johnny's Garden"		2:46
4.	"Rock & Roll Crazies/Cuban Bluegrass"	Stills, Dallas Taylor/Stills, Joe Lala	3:34
5.	"Sit Yourself Down"		3:05
Total length:			35:50

== Personnel ==
See Stephen Stills 2 for personnel listing of "Marianne" and "Change Partners."

- Stephen Stills — vocals, guitars, bass, keyboards, steel drum, percussion
- Chris Hillman — vocals, guitars, mandolin on "It Doesn't Matter," "Bound to Fall," "Isn't It About Time," "Johnny's Garden," "Rock & Roll Crazies/Cuban Bluegrass"
- Al Perkins — pedal steel guitar, guitar, vocals on "It Doesn't Matter," "Bound to Fall," "Isn't It About Time," "Johnny's Garden," "Rock & Roll Crazies/Cuban Bluegrass"
- Eric Clapton — electric guitar on "Go Back Home"
- Byron Berline — fiddle on "Rock & Roll Crazies/Cuban Bluegrass"
- Sydney George — harmonica on "Rock & Roll Crazies/Cuban Bluegrass"
- Paul Harris — organ, tack piano, piano, electric piano, clavinet on "It Doesn't Matter," "Bound to Fall," "Isn't It About Time," "Johnny's Garden," "Rock & Roll Crazies/Cuban Bluegrass"
- Calvin "Fuzzy" Samuel — bass on "Love the One You're With, "It Doesn't Matter," "Bound to Fall," "Isn't It About Time," "Go Back Home," "Johnny's Garden," "Rock & Roll Crazies/Cuban Bluegrass," and "Sit Yourself Down"
- Roger Bush — bass on "Rock & Roll Crazies/Cuban Bluegrass"
- Dallas Taylor — drums on "It Doesn't Matter," "Bound to Fall," "Isn't It About Time," "Johnny's Garden," "Rock & Roll Crazies/Cuban Bluegrass"
- John Barbata — drums on "Go Back Home" and "Sit Yourself Down"
- Ringo Starr — drums on "We Are Not Helpless"
- Joe Lala — congas, timbales, vocals on "It Doesn't Matter," "Bound to Fall," "Isn't It About Time," "Johnny's Garden," "Rock & Roll Crazies/Cuban Bluegrass"
- Jeff Whittaker — congas on "Love the One You're With"
- Rita Coolidge, David Crosby, Priscilla Jones, John Sebastian — backing vocals on "Love the One You're With," "Go Back Home," "Sit Yourself Down," and "We Are Not Helpless"
- Cass Elliott, Claudia Lennear — backing vocals on "Go Back Home," "Sit Yourself Down," and "We Are Not Helpless"
- Graham Nash — backing vocals on "Love the One You're With," "Sit Yourself Down," and "We Are Not Helpless"
- Sherlie Matthews, Booker T. Jones — backing vocals on "We Are Not Helpless"

Technical Personnel

- John David Kalodner — album coordination
- George Piros — audio mastering
- David Gahr — photography
- Bob Defrin — art direction
- Michael John Bowen — thanks

== Charts ==
Chart performance for Still Stills: The Best of Stephen Stills
Chart (1976–1977)	Peak position
US Billboard Top LPs & Tape	127
US Cash Box Top 100 Albums	145
US Record World Album Chart	145
