= Replay (Crosby, Stills & Nash album) =

Compilation album by Crosby, Stills & Nash
- Released: December 8, 1980
- Genre: Rock
- Length: 38:13
- Label: Atlantic
- Producers: Bill Halverson; David Crosby; Graham Nash; Stephen Stills

Crosby, Stills & Nash chronology
| CSN (1977) | Replay (1980) | Daylight Again (1982) |

Professional ratings
Review scores
| Source | Rating |
|---|---|
| Allmusic | 3/5 stars |

Replay is a compilation album by Crosby, Stills & Nash, appearing in 1980 on the Atlantic Records label. It contains no material with Neil Young, but does include CSN solo projects. It peaked at No. 122 on the Billboard 200, their first album not to chart in the top ten.

== Background ==
In 1980, Stephen Stills invited Graham Nash to accompany him on a tour of Europe, both subsequently deciding to record songs together. The label, however, wanted more CSN product, and with the pair still in process, released this package for the Christmas sales season. The pair continued to work in the studio together, but again Atlantic Records insisted on the inclusion of David Crosby as the CSN brand increased sales potential greatly, which would result in their next album, Daylight Again. Apparently given his minimal number of writing credits and therefore low royalties, Crosby had no hand in the selection for Replay, dismissing the album as "an obvious money trip, nothing more."

== Assembly ==
The track selection avoids duplication with songs on the still available So Far so misses charting singles in "Teach Your Children," "Suite: Judy Blue Eyes", and "Woodstock". All songs were previously released, with four having appeared on non-CSN albums. "Love the One You're With" and "First Things First" include Crosby and Nash on vocals; those as well as "Change Partners" derive from solo albums by Stills, the third of which, entitled Stills, had been released not on Atlantic but on Columbia. "To the Last Whale...," comprising the songs "Critical Mass" by Crosby and "Wind on the Water" by Nash, comes from their duo album on ABC Records. Two other songs were altered. Stills edited "Carry On" by removing the "Questions" section, adding a new guitar solo along with overdubbed bass and drums, and ending the song with a repeat of the "Carry on, love is coming..." line instead of the guitar solo fade out. "I Give You Give Blind" was remixed to remove the strings heard on the original version. For "First Things First", the percussion intro that was taken off Stills was left on for this album.

== Track listing ==
Side one
| No. | Title | Writer(s) | Notes | Length |
|---|---|---|---|---|
| 1. | "Carry On" | Stephen Stills | 1980 edited version with overdubs; originally from Déjà Vu, 1970 | 3:17 |
| 2. | "Marrakesh Express" | Graham Nash | Crosby, Stills & Nash, 1969 | 2:36 |
| 3. | "Just a Song Before I Go" | Nash | CSN, 1977 | 2:12 |
| 4. | "First Things First" | Stills, Joe Schermie, Jon Smith | Longer Intro Stills (Stephen Stills), 1975 | 2:16 |
| 5. | "Shadow Captain" | David Crosby, Craig Doerge | CSN | 4:32 |
| 6. | "To the Last Whale..." | Crosby, Nash | Wind on the Water (Crosby & Nash), 1975 | 5:30 |

Side two
| No. | Title | Writer(s) | Notes | Length |
|---|---|---|---|---|
| 1. | "Love the One You're With" | Stills | Stephen Stills (Stephen Stills), 1970 | 3:13 |
| 2. | "Pre-Road Downs" | Nash | Crosby, Stills & Nash | 3:03 |
| 3. | "Change Partners" | Stills | Stephen Stills 2 (Stephen Stills), 1971 | 3:12 |
| 4. | "I Give You Give Blind" | Stills | 1980 remix, originally from CSN | 3:21 |
| 5. | "Cathedral" | Nash | CSN | 5:15 |

== Personnel ==
- David Crosby – vocals; acoustic guitar on "Just A Song Before I Go"; string arrangements on "Cathedral"
- Stephen Stills – vocals all tracks except "To the Last Whale"; guitars all tracks except "To the Last Whale" and "Cathedral"; bass on "Carry On," "Marrakesh Express," and "Pre-Road Downs"; keyboards on "Carry On," "Marrakesh Express" "Pre-Road Downs," and "Change Partners" congas, overdubbed drums on "Carry On"; steel drum, percussion on "Love the One You're With"
- Graham Nash – vocals all tracks except "Change Partners"; rhythm guitar on "Marrakesh Express" and "Pre-Road Downs"; piano on "Just A Song Before I Go," "To the Last Whale...," and "Cathedral"; string arrangements on "Cathedral"; congas on "Carry On"

=== Additional musicians ===
- Joe Vitale – drums, percussion on "Cathedral" and "I Give You Give Blind"; organ on "Shadow Captain"; electric piano on "Just A Song Before I Go"; tympani on "Cathedral"
- Craig Doerge – electric piano on "Shadow Captain" and "To the Last Whale..."; piano on "Shadow Captain"; synthesizer on "To the Last Whale..."
- James Taylor – acoustic guitar on "To the Last Whale..."
- Paul Harris – keyboards on "Change Partners"
- George "Chocolate" Perry – bass on "Shadow Captain," "I Give You Give Blind," and "Cathedral"
- Calvin "Fuzzy" Samuels – bass on "Love the One You're With" and "Change Partners"
- Tim Drummond – bass on "Just A Song Before I Go"
- Leland Sklar – bass on "To the Last Whale..."
- Kenny Passarelli – bass on "First Things First"
- Dallas Taylor – drums on "Carry On" "First Things First," "Pre-Road Downs," and "Change Partners"
- Russ Kunkel – drums on "Just A Song Before I Go," "Shadow Captain," and "To the Last Whale..."; congas on "Shadow Captain"; percussion on "Just A Song Before I Go"
- Jim Gordon – drums on "Marrakesh Express"
- Jeff Whitaker – congas on "Love the One You're With"
- Joe Lala – percussion on "First Things First"
- Rita Coolidge, Priscilla Jones, John Sebastian – backing vocals on "Love the One You're With"
- Fred Neil, Henry Diltz – backing vocals on "Change Partners"
- Cass Elliot – backing vocals on "Pre-Road Downs"
- Mike Lewis, Joel Bernstein – string arrangements on "Cathedral"
- Jerry Garcia - pedal steel guitar on "Change Partners"

== Charts ==
Chart performance for Replay
| Chart (1980–1981) | Peak position |
|---|---|
| US Top LPs & Tape (Billboard) | 122 |
| US Cash Box Top 100 Albums | 146 |
