= Manassas (album) =

Album by Manassas

Studio album by Manassas
- Released: April 12, 1972
- Recorded: Late 1971
- Studios: Criteria Sound Studios, Miami, Florida
- Genres: Country rock, folk rock, roots rock
- Length: 71:57
- Label: Atlantic
- Producers: Stephen Stills, Chris Hillman, Dallas Taylor

Stephen Stills chronology
Stephen Stills 2 (1971)	Manassas (1972)	Down the Road (1973)

Manassas chronology
Manassas (1972)	Down the Road (1973)

Singles from Manassas
- 1. "It Doesn't Matter" / "Rock & Roll Crazies Medley" Released: 1972; 2. "Rock & Roll Crazies" / "Colorado" Released: 1972

Manassas is the 1972 debut double album by Manassas, a blues rock group led by American musician Stephen Stills, released April 1972. It was a critical comeback for Stills and continued his commercial success by being certified Gold only a month after being released and peaking at number 4 on the US charts.

== Recording ==
The album was recorded at Criteria Studio B late 1971, where Stills used his clout to keep the studio and engineers Ron and Howard Albert available around the clock. The band all stayed in a rented house about 30 minutes away from the studio, in Coconut Grove. This allowed Stills to record the album around the clock, waking up band members in the early hours of the morning when an idea struck. Stills would also record in mammoth sessions often going on for days, until Chris Hillman and Stills got into a fight, after which they started to record at regular hours. Al Perkins and Dallas Taylor had a rule where they would not perform any more than seven takes for a single track, so often Stills would stay in the studio editing after having released the band at 4 or 5 am. The band then flew to Stills' house in London in January 1972 to finish recording and mixing the album and to rehearse for an upcoming tour starting in March 1972. It was here that Bill Wyman of the Rolling Stones played bass on and co-authored "The Love Gangster" and is reported to have said that he would have left the Stones to join Manassas. At one point Stills put in an unbroken 106 hour stint in the studio, and engineer Ron Albert said he had just got to bed after a marathon session lasting 84 hours when the phone rang with Stills summoning him back to the studio with the words: "I know you're tired, but there's this idea I've got for this song that I want to get on tape before I forget it..." Another time, working to Stills' manic schedule, the band cut eight tracks in two days with no sleep.

== Songs ==
The album was split into four thematic sides. Side 1, The Raven, is a composite of rock and Latin sounds that the group would often perform in full live exactly as presented on the album, including the segues that connected several of the songs. Side 2, The Wilderness, mainly centers on country and bluegrass, and features Chris Hillman on mandolin and fiddler Byron Berline. Side 3, Consider, presents a mix of musical styles, including "Johnny's Garden" (reportedly written for the caretaker at Stills' English manor house bought from Ringo Starr), and Stills using a Moog synthesizer on "Move Around". Side 4, Rock & Roll Is Here to Stay, features rock and blues songs, including "The Treasure", a mainstay of Manassas' live sets, and Stills' acoustic solo piece "Blues Man".

Several of the songs on the album are inspired by Stills' romantic relationship with Rita Coolidge, and Coolidge's leaving Stills for his CSNY bandmate Graham Nash. In particular, "Raven" was Stills' nickname for Coolidge, while "What to Do" and "Right Now" were written about CSNY's subsequent breakup and Stills' relationship with Nash.

== Artwork and packaging ==
The artwork was taken after Stills, a Civil War buff, had the band flown over to Manassas station in Manassas, Virginia, where the Confederacy had claimed its first major victory at the Battle of Bull Run. The photo they liked was the band standing on the platform under a Manassas sign, and so the band was named. Included with the album were fold-out posters with named pictures of all the members and hand-written lyrics on the back, including a message urging people to 'Use The Power, Register and Vote'.

== Chart performance ==
The album debuted on the Billboard Top LP's chart for the week ending April 29, 1972 and eventually peaked at No. 4 in June, during a 30-week run. Stills' album shared the top 5 with an album by David Crosby and Graham Nash (Graham Nash David Crosby) and an album by Neil Young (Harvest), all collectively members of the quartet Crosby, Stills, Nash & Young. "It Doesn't Matter" was released as a single and peaked at No. 61, during a chart run of 7 weeks. "Rock & Roll Crazies" was released as the second single and peaked at No. 92 during a 3-week run. By 1974, it had sold an estimated 400,000 copies in the US, which is the equivalent of 800,000 as the album is a double.

== Reception ==
Professional ratings
Review scores
Source	Rating
AllMusic	4.5/5 stars
Christgau's Record Guide	C+
The Encyclopedia of Popular Music	5/5 stars

Manassas marked a critical comeback for Stills, with AllMusic calling it a "sprawling masterpiece" and Rolling Stone saying it was "reassuring to know that Stills has some good music still inside him. Most of it has a substantial, honest sound found on too few records these days. All the sounds you hear come from the seven group members". Chris Hillman was singled out as an "importance in the success of Manassas and in the comeback of Stills, he can't be over-stressed [...] He's a masterful musician whether he's playing bass, guitar, or mandolin, and his boyishly pure, uncolored voice can carry a lot of emotional weight.". However, Robert Christgau rated the album C+ and in a mixed review stated "Yes, Steve has gotten it together a little, even deigning to cooperate with real musicians in a real band, and yes, some of this four-sided set echoes in your head after you play it a lot. The only problem is you're never sure where the echoes come from". In positive reviews, Record World called it "music of the highest order", Cash Box said it will "convince you of Stills' worth", and Billboard said it "offers loads of class material". In a June 1972 review for The San Diego Door, Cameron Crowe said "Manassas always remains admirable if not exciting. The musicianship is generally excellent with the only pitfall being that the droning Stills' vocal pervades all but one of the LP's sixteen cuts". He also stated the "lyrics represent a low-point in Stills' lyricist career". Chris Welch for Melody Maker said "The blues, soul, rock and country music are all the influences. They play them like the Grateful Dead, with a sincerity and ability that one does not always detect in the work of those exclusively involved in the original idiom".

Andrew Weiner for Creem said "Stills, perhaps the most maligned superstar in recent rock history, has finally - and against all the odds - got it on. And Stills has written too many good songs here even to try count them".

The album was certified Gold on May 30, 1972, just over a month after being released. Stills has stated the album did not receive the recognition it deserved due to Atlantic Records and Ahmet Ertegun (head of Atlantic Records) wanting him back in the "goldmine" that was Crosby, Stills, Nash & Young. Stills said that as soon as the album shipped gold, Ertegun pulled it, and people could not find it in stores.

The album was included in the book 1001 Albums You Must Hear Before You Die.

It was voted number 735 in Colin Larkin's All Time Top 1000 Albums 3rd Edition (2000).

Retrospectively, in 2022 the album was called a roots rock "landmark".

== Track listing ==
All tracks are written by Stephen Stills, except where indicated.

Side one – The Raven
No.	Title	Writer(s)	Length
1.	"Song of Love"		3:28
2.	"Medley: Rock & Roll Crazies; Cuban Bluegrass"	Stills, Dallas Taylor; Stills, Joe Lala	3:34
3.	"Jet Set (Sigh)"		4:25
4.	"Anyway"		4:21
5.	"Both of Us (Bound to Lose)"	Stills, Chris Hillman	3:00
Total length:			17:48

Side two – The Wilderness
No.	Title	Length
6.	"Fallen Eagle"	2:03
7.	"Jesus Gave Love Away for Free"	2:59
8.	"Colorado"	2:50
9.	"So Begins the Task"	3:57
10.	"Hide It So Deep"	2:44
11.	"Don't Look at My Shadow"	2:30
Total length:		17:03

Side three – Consider
No.	Title	Writer(s)	Length
12.	"It Doesn't Matter" (original releases of Manassas do not credit Roberts as a co-author)	Stills, Hillman, Rick Roberts	2:30
13.	"Johnny's Garden"		2:45
14.	"Bound to Fall" (original releases of Manassas do not credit Mastin as a co-author)	Mike Brewer, Tom Mastin	1:53
15.	"How Far"		2:49
16.	"Move Around"		4:15
17.	"The Love Gangster"	Stills, Bill Wyman	2:51
Total length:			16:53

Side four – Rock & Roll Is Here to Stay
No.	Title	Length
18.	"What to Do"	4:44
19.	"Right Now"	2:58
20.	"The Treasure (Take One)"	8:03
21.	"Blues Man" (in tribute: Jimi Hendrix, Al Wilson, Duane Allman)	4:04
Total length:		19:49

== Personnel ==
Manassas

- Stephen Stills - vocals, guitar, bottleneck guitar, piano, organ, electric piano, clavinet, Moog synthesizer
- Chris Hillman - vocals, guitar, mandolin
- Al Perkins - pedal steel guitar, guitar, vocals
- Paul Harris - organ, tack piano, piano, electric piano, clavinet
- Dallas Taylor - drums
- Calvin "Fuzzy" Samuel - bass
- Joe Lala - congas, timbales/percussion, vocals

Additional players

- Sydney George - harmonica (on "The Raven" and "The Wilderness")
- Jerry Aiello (on "The Raven" and "The Wilderness") - piano, organ, electric piano, clavinet
- Bill Wyman - bass (on "The Love Gangster" and "Rock & Roll Crazies")
- Roger Bush - acoustic bass (on "The Raven" and "The Wilderness")
- Byron Berline - fiddle
- Malcolm Cecil - Expanded Series III Moog synthesizer programming

Technical

- The Albert Brothers - engineers
- Stephen Stills, Ira H. Wexler - cover design
- Ira H. Wexler - photography

Special thanks to Bruce Berry & Guillermo Giachetti, Daniel J. Campbell, Michael John Bowen, Michael O'Hara Garcia, Buddy P. Zoloth, Edward Astrin & Ahmet Ertegun

== Charts ==
Chart performance for Manassas
Chart (1972)	Peak position
US Billboard Top LPs	4
UK Album Charts	30
Canadian RPM 100 Albums	9
Dutch MegaCharts Albums	1
West German Media Control Albums	34
Norwegian VG-lista Albums	6
Australian Go-Set Top 20 Albums	17
Swedish Kvällstoppen Chart	8
US Cash Box Top 100 Albums	6
US Record World Album Chart	4
Chart (2013)	Peak position
Japan Oricon Albums Charts	292

Sales chart performance for singles from Manassas
Year	Single	Chart	Position
1972	"It Doesn't Matter"	US Billboard Hot 100	61
1972	"It Doesn't Matter"	Canada Top Singles (RPM)	48
1972	"It Doesn't Matter"	US Top Singles (Cash Box)	49
1972	"It Doesn't Matter"	US Top Singles (Record World)	46
1972	"Rock & Roll Crazies Medley"	US Billboard Hot 100	92
1972	"Rock & Roll Crazies Medley"	US Top Singles (Cash Box)	111
1972	"Rock & Roll Crazies Medley"	US Top Singles (Record World)	86

Year-end album charts

Chart (1972)	Position
US Billboard Pop Albums	53
US Cash Box	64
Dutch MegaCharts Albums	10

== Certifications ==
Region	Certification	Certified units/sales
United States (RIAA)	Gold	250,000^{^}
^{^} Shipments figures based on certification alone.

== Tour ==
1972 Manassas World Tour
- Tour by Stephen Stills Manassas
- Start date: March 21, 1972
- End date: December 9, 1972
- Legs: 7

Stephen Stills Manassas concert chronology
- Stephen Stills Memphis Horns Tour 1971; 1972 Manassas World Tour; Manassas North American Tour 1973

Manassas toured across the world in 1972, this being Stills biggest solo tour date, playing arenas in the Americas, and headlining festivals in Australia. After the initial Manassas tour from 9 April to 20 May. Manassas then completed five tours in six months, from July 14 to July 30 they toured the West Coast, the second tour from 11 to 28 August toured the East Coast, they then toured Europe and Scandinavia from September 13 to October 9. The fourth tour was a tour of Midwestern American Colleges, and finally the fifth tour was conducted in the South from December 1–19. During this tour Manassas had a charter plane and toured manically, but Stills was losing money on these tours as he was paying the band very generously.

Date	City	Country	Venue	Attendance/Notes
Europe Tour
21 March 1972	Bremen	Germany	Beat Club (German TV)	
22 March 1972	Amsterdam	Netherlands	Concertgebouw	
23 March 1972	Frankfurt	Germany	Jahrhunderthalle	
25 March 1972	London	England	Big Beat Club	
26 March 1972	Paris	France	L'Olympia	
Australia
31 March 1972	Albury	Australia	Rock Isle (Mulwala) Festival	Headlined both nights
1 April 1972	Albury	Australia	Rock Isle (Mulwala) Festival	Headlined both nights
2 April 1972	Albury	Australia	~~Rock Isle (Mulwala) Festival~~	Due to headline (Cancelled due to weather)
US Tour
9 April 1972	Honolulu	United States	HIC Arena	
14 April 1972	Auburn	United States	Auburn Memorial Coliseum	
15 April 1972	Jackson	United States	Mississippi Coliseum	
17 April 1972	New Orleans	United States	Municipal Auditorium	
19 April 1972	Baton Rouge	United States	Assembly Center	
21 April 1972	Gainesville	United States	Fieldhouse	
22 April 1972	Dania	United States	Pirates World	Sold Out
23 April 1972	Tampa	United States	Tampa Jai Alai Fronton	Professionally Recorded
26 April 1972	Oxford	United States	Mississippi Colisseum	
28 April 1972	St Louis	United States	Kiel Auditorium	
29 April 1972	Peoria	United States	Fieldhouse	
30 April 1972	Chicago	United States	Arie Crown Theatre	
1 May 1972	Chicago	United States	Arie Crown Theatre	
2 May 1972	New York City	United States	Carnegie Hall	
4 May 1972	New York City	United States	Carnegie Hall	
5 May 1972	Boston	United States	Boston Garden	
7 May 1972	Uniondale	United States	Nassau Colisseum	
9 May 1972	Buffalo	United States	Buffalo Memorial Auditorium	
12 May 1972	Philadelphia	United States	The Spectrum Theatre	6,410
13 May 1972	Williamsburg	United States	Kaplan Arena	
15 May 1972	Atlanta	United States	Alexander Memorial Coliseum	
18 May 1972	San Antonio	United States	San Antonio Municipal Auditorium	
19 May 1972	Houston	United States	Hofheinz Pavilion	
20 May 1972	Dallas	United States	Dallas Memorial Auditorium	
West Coast Tour
8 July 1972	Miami	United States	Miami Jai-Alai Fronton	Dolphin Benefit, concert recorded John Sebastian, Fred Neil guest
14 July 1972	Fresno	United States	Selland Arena	
15 July 1972	Las Vegas	United States	Las Vegas Stadium	
16 July 1972	Los Angeles	United States	Hollywood Bowl	Bryon Berline guests
17 July 1972	Santa Barbara	United States	Santa Barbara County Bowl	
20 July 1972	Sacramento	United States	Sacramento Memorial Auditorium	
21 July 1972	Berkeley	United States	Berkeley Community Theatre	Sold Out Roger McGuinn, Neil Young & Graham Nash guest on 22 July
22 July 1972	Berkeley	United States	Berkeley Community Theatre	Sold Out Roger McGuinn, Neil Young & Graham Nash guest on 22 July
23 July 1972	Berkeley	United States	Berkeley Community Theatre	Sold Out Roger McGuinn, Neil Young & Graham Nash guest on 22 July
24 July 1972	Albuquerque	United States	Johnson Gym	
25 July 1972	Denver	United States	Denver Coliseum	
26 July 1972	San Diego	United States	San Diego Sports Arena	
28 July 1972	San Bernardino	United States	Swing Auditorium	
30 July 1972	Tucson	United States	Tucson Community Centre	
East Coast Tour
11 August 1972	Washington	United States	Merriweather Post Pavilion	
12 August 1972	New York	United States	Roosevelt Raceway	Festival of Hope
14 August 1972	Clarkston	United States	Pine Knob Music Theatre	
19 August 1972	Wildwood	United States	Wildwood Convention Hall	
European Tour
15 September 1972	Manchester	Europe	The Hardrock Concert Theatre	
17 September 1972	London	Europe	Rainbow Theatre	BBC TV recorded for Stephen Stills Manassas: In Concert – broadcast on 16 Nov 1972
20 September 1972	Nederlands	Europe	Unknown Venue	
22 September 1972	Stockholm	Europe	Kungliga Tennishallen	
24 September 1972	Hamburg	Europe	Musikhalle	
26 September 1972	Frankfurt	Europe	Jahrunderthalle	
3 October 1972	Amsterdam	Europe	Concertgebouw	
5 October 1972	Paris	Europe	Bastille Railroad Station	
7 October 1972	Norway	Europe	Unknown Venue	
9 October 1972	Belgium	Europe	Unknown Venue	
10 October 1972	London	Europe	Sundown Festival	
Midwest American College Tour
19 October 1972	Bloomington	United States	Indiana University Assembly Hall	
20 October 1972	Tulsa	United States	Assembly Centre	
22 October 1972	Minneapolis	United States	Minneapolis Auditorium	4,700
26 October 1972	Madison	United States	Dane County Coliseum	
27 October 1972	South Bend	United States	Athletics And Convocation Centre	
28 October 1972	Indiana University	United States	Assembly Hall	
2 November 1972	Dayton	United States	Dayton Arena	
3 November 1972	Michigan State University	United States	Jenison Fieldhouse	
4 November 1972	Port Clinton	United States	Field House, University of Toledo	
8 November 1972	Stanford University	United States	Maples Pavilion	
11 November 1972	Washington	United States	Hec Edmundson Pavilion	
12 November 1972	~~Vancouver~~	~~Canada~~	~~Pacific Coliseum~~	Cancelled
16 November 1972	Portland	United States	Veterans Memorial Coliseum	
17 November 1972	Corvallis	United States	Gill Coliseum	
18 November 1972	Utah	United States	Dee Glen Smith Spectrum	
South Tour
9 December 1972	Anaheim	United States	Anaheim Convention Center	

Manassas

- Stephen Stills - vocals, guitar, keyboards
- Chris Hillman - vocals, guitar, mandolin
- Al Perkins - pedal steel guitar, guitar, vocals
- Paul Harris – organ, piano, electric piano, clavinet
- Dallas Taylor – drums
- Calvin "Fuzzy" Samuel – bass
- Joe Lala – congas, timbales/percussion, vocals

Tour setlist

Typical tour set list

All songs written by Stephen Stills, except where noted.

1. "Rock and Roll Woman"
2. "Bound to Fall"
3. "Hot Burrito #2" (Chris Ethridge, Gram Parsons)
4. "It Doesn't Matter"
5. "So You Want to Be a Rock 'n' Roll Star" (Jim McGuinn, Chris Hillman) (also played on April 22, 1972, in Dania, FL)
6. "Go Back Home"
7. "Change Partners"
8. "Know You Got to Run" (Stills, John Hopkins)
9. "Crossroads Blues" (Robert Johnson) (also played on April 22, 1972, in Dania, FL)
10. "Black Queen" (also played on April 22, 1972, in Dania, FL)
11. "4+20"
12. "Blues Man"
13. "Word Game"
14. "Do for the Others"
15. "Move Around"
16. "Both of Us (Bound to Loose)" (Stills, Chris Hillman)
17. "Love the One You're With"
18. "He Was a Friend of Mine"
19. "Fallen Eagle"
20. "Hide It So Deep"
21. "Johnny's Garden" (or "You're Still on My Mind" (Luke McDaniel) (played on April 22, 1972, in Dania, FL))
22. "Don't Look at My Shadow"
23. "Sugar Babe"
24. "49 Bye-Byes" (also played on April 22, 1972, in Dania, FL)
25. "For What It's Worth"
26. "Song of Love"
27. "Rock & Roll Crazies"
28. "Cuban Bluegrass"
29. "Jet Set (Sigh)"
30. "Anyway"
31. "The Treasure"
32. "Carry On" (also played on April 22, 1972, in Dania, FL)
33. "Find the Cost of Freedom/Daylight Again"
