= Down the Road (Manassas album) =

Studio album by Manassas
- Released: April 23, 1973
- Recorded: September 1972, January 1973
- Studios: Criteria Sound Studios, Miami, Florida; Caribou Ranch, Colorado; The Record Plant, Los Angeles
- Genres: Country rock, blues rock, folk rock, Southern rock
- Length: 30:50
- Label: Atlantic
- Producers: Stephen Stills, Chris Hillman, Dallas Taylor

Stephen Stills chronology
Manassas (1972)	Down the Road (1973)	Stills (1975)

Manassas chronology
Manassas (1972)	Down the Road (1973)	Pieces (2009)

Singles from Down the Road
- 1. "Isn't It About Time" / "So Many Times" Released: April 14, 1973; 2. "Down The Road" / "Guaguancó de Veró" Released: July 21, 1973

Down the Road is the second and last studio album by Stephen Stills' band Manassas. It was released in April 1973, and peaked at number 26 in the US charts, to mixed reviews. "Isn't It About Time", a protest song, was released as the lead single and reached number 56 on the charts.

== Background ==
After a very critically and commercially successful year, 1972, things changed when they regrouped to record at Criteria Studios in early 1973. Stills had met and married French pop singer Veronique Sanson, while Chris Hillman re-united with the rest of the Byrds for a one-shot reunion album. Hillman was also entertaining a big-money offer from David Geffen's Asylum Records to form a new super-group with JD Souther and Richie Furay. Arguments and increased drug-use were extremely prevalent, and Stills was losing money paying for each member each night. Before and during the recording of this album Stills maintained a round the clock schedule with Manassas in the studio, which resulted in another album of unreleased material written by Stills, Hillman, Dallas Taylor, and Fuzzy Samuel, that included Stevie Wonder singing on a track.

== Recording ==
The album was initially recorded at Criteria Studios, Miami with the Albert Brothers, until an increasingly combative Stills caused the brothers to quit halfway during recording, so sessions moved to Caribou Ranch, Colorado and to Los Angeles. Tapes from the sessions at Caribou Ranch were taken to Criteria but Stills found it difficult to focus on the project because he was still not in the best of shape in the studio. A jam session with Bobby Whitlock and Dallas Taylor was recorded by The Albert Brothers. It was later overdubbed by Stills, who put new words to the melody. This became the song “City Junkies”, for which Stills took sole writing credit for. To make matters worse Atlantic Records, then rejected some of the tracks, which necessitated re-recordings, resulting in patchwork quality to the album. Some suspect that the album was rejected for containing too few Stills' songs and too many from Chris Hillman. "Down the Road" and "So Many Times" were recorded in September 1972 at Criteria, Miami. The rest of the tracks were recorded in January 1973.

== Aftermath ==
After the dysfunctional recording sessions and some initial touring dates, the band started to fall apart with Stills and Joe Lala, joining Crosby, Nash and Young in Hawaii for an (ill-fated) reunion, and Hillman, Al Perkins and Paul Harris all joining the Souther-Hillman-Furay Band. By the time Stills continued on with Manassas, Dallas Taylor was dealing with crippling heroin addiction. Stills paid for him to go to rehab, then found him shooting up in a bathroom, which ended Taylor's stint in the band. Calvin "Fuzzy" Samuel left for personal reasons around the same time and was replaced by Kenny Passarelli. The subsequent set of touring dates were the band's last, ending in October, with Stills reuniting with Crosby, Nash & Young for a tour the following year.

Stills supported the album with two tours and a performance on ABC's In Concert series on the 16th April 1973 at Bananafish Gardens, New York, which was maligned upon showing; one video of the band performing "Do You Remember the Americans" has appeared, but nothing else since.

== Reception ==
Professional ratings
Review scores
Source	Rating
AllMusic	2.5/5 stars
The Encyclopedia of Popular Music	4/5 stars

The album was not very well received. Rolling Stone was especially critical, saying "[i]t would be sad to think the people involved put this record out not because of business pressures but because they were proud of it." Richard Williams of Melody Maker wrote in 1973, "For me, the two Latin songs are the best; Stills has a real affinity for this music - the hoarse strained quality of his voice suits the yearning mood of the tunes - and I'd love to see 'Pensamiento' become a hit single".

It made it only to No. 26 on the Billboard album charts and its single, "Isn't It About Time", made it only to No. 56 on the Billboard singles charts. By 1974, the album had sold an estimated 300,000 copies in the US.

Stills blamed the failure of the album on Atlantic preferring to have a CSNY reunion, which was a guaranteed cash cow. Other reasons for the commercial decline include record stores not knowing which section to put the album in: either under Stills' name or under Manassas'. Billboard, Record World and Cash Box all credited the album to Manassas rather than Stephen Stills' Manassas like they credited the debut record; Meaning, many people might have been unaware that this was a new Stephen Stills album.

== Track listing ==
All tracks are written by Stephen Stills, except where indicated.

Side one
No.	Title	Writer(s)	Length
1.	"Isn't It About Time"		3:02
2.	"Lies"	Chris Hillman	2:55
3.	"Pensamiento"	Stephen Stills, Nelson Escoto	2:36
4.	"So Many Times"	Chris Hillman, Stephen Stills	3:30
5.	"Business on the Street"		2:55

Side two
No.	Title	Writer(s)	Length
1.	"Do You Remember the Americans"		2:05
2.	"Down the Road"		3:16
3.	"City Junkies"		2:50
4.	"Guaguancó de Veró"	Stephen Stills, Joe Lala	2:51
5.	"Rollin' My Stone"	Stephen Stills, Calvin Samuel	4:50
Total length:			30:50

== Personnel ==
Manassas

- Stephen Stills - guitar, piano, bass, vocals
- Dallas Taylor - drums
- Chris Hillman - guitar, bass, mandolin, vocals
- Joe Lala - percussion, vocals
- Al Perkins - guitar, pedal steel guitar, banjo
- Calvin "Fuzzy" Samuel - bass, vocals
- Paul Harris - piano

Guests

- Joe Walsh - slide guitar
- Bobby Whitlock - Hammond B3
- Sydney George - flute
- Jerry Aiello - organ
- Charlie Grimes - guitar
- Guille Garcia - percussion
- Lachy Espinol - percussion
- P. P. Arnold - vocals

Technical Personnel

- Stephen Stills, Chris Hillman, Dallas Taylor - production
- The Albert Brothers - engineers at Criteria Studios, Miami, Florida
- Jeff Guerico - engineer at Caribou Ranch, Nederland, Colorado
- Bill Halverson, Malcolm Cecil - engineers at Record Plant, Los Angeles, California
- The Albert Brothers, Bill Halverson, Stephen Stills - mixdown engineers
- Bob Jenkins - photography
- Bob Jenkins, Buddy Zoloth - design

Thanks again to Michael John Bowen and his Manassas road crew

== Charts ==
Album

Chart performance for Down the Road
Chart (1973)	Peak position
US Billboard Top LPs & Tape	26
UK Album Charts	33
Canadian RPM 100 Albums	31
Swedish Kvällstoppen Chart	18
Spanish Album Charts	19
US Cash Box Top 100 Albums	25
US Record World Album Chart	18

Singles

Sales chart performance for singles from Down the Road
Year	Single	Chart	Position
1973	"Isn't It About Time"	US Billboard Hot 100	56
1973	"Isn't It About Time"	Canada Top Singles (RPM)	77
1973	"Isn't It About Time"	US Top Singles (Cash Box)	62
1973	"Isn't It About Time"	US Top Singles (Record World)	62
1973	"Down the Road"	US Top Singles (Record World)	129

== Tour ==
Manassas North American Tour 1973
- Tour by Stephen Stills
- Start date: February 19, 1973
- End date: October 13, 1973
- Legs: 2

Stephen Stills concert chronology
- Manassas World Tour 1972; Manassas North American Tour 1973; 1974 Theater Tour

The Stephen Stills Manassas North American Tour 1973 was a concert tour by American musician Stephen Stills and his band Manassas. It was in support of their 1973 album Down the Road. Released in April 1973, the album was less well received than their debut, with many of the recording sessions for it being disjointed. This resulted in the cancellation of a few dates of the first leg of the tour. The first show back was recorded for the ABC in Concert TV series, during which Stills remarked that he hadn't played with the band since before Christmas. This show wasn't very well received. CSNY reunited to record an aborted album in June–July 1973 further complicating the tour. However CSN and CSNY reunited at the October Winterland Arena shows which planted the seeds for the CSNY 1974 reunion tour. It was during this second leg of the tour that John Barbata filled in for Dallas Taylor on the drums for one show due to his drug addiction and Kenny Passarelli filled in for George "Chocolate" Perry on bass due to prior commitments.

Tour
Date	City	Country	Venue	Notes
9 February 1973	Raleigh	United States	~~Reynolds Coliseum~~	Cancelled to finish recording
14 February 1973	Charlotte	United States	~~Charlotte Colisseum~~	Cancelled to finish recording
17 February 1973	Atlanta	United States	~~Municipal Auditorium~~	Cancelled to finish recording
18 February 1973	Chapel Hill	United States	~~Carmichael Auditorium~~	Cancelled to finish recording
19 February 1973	New York	United States	Academy Of Music	Professionally recorded
20/21 February 1973	New York	United States	Bannanafish Garden	Filmed for ABC In Concert Broadcast on 16 March 1973
23 March 1973	Columbia	United States	Hearnes Auditorium	
24 March 1973	Ames	United States	Hilton Colisseum	
25 March 1973	Illinois	United States	Horton Field House	
27 March 1973	Pittsburgh	United States	Civic Arena	
30 March 1973	Chapel Hill	United States	Carmichael Auditorium	
31 March 1973	Raleigh	United States	Reynolds Coliseum	
2 April 1973	Atlanta	United States	Municipal Auditorium	
3 April 1973	Athens	United States	Georgia Colisseum	
6 April 1973	Williamsburg	United States	Kaplan Arena	
8 April 1973	West Virginia	United States	West Virginia University Coliseum	
11 April 1973	Richmond	United States	Alumni Coliseum	
13 April 1973	College Park	United States	Cole Field House	
14 April 1973	Charlottesville	United States	University Hall University Of Virginia	
15 April 1973	Salem	United States	Roanoke College	
Date	City	Country	Venue	
10 July 1973	Cleveland	United States	Blossom Music Centre	
12 July 1973	Clarkston	United States	Pine Knob Music Theatre	
13 July 1973	Milwaukee	United States	Henry W. Maier Festival Park	
29 July 1973	Columbia	United States	Merriweather Post Pavilion	9,000+ attendance
30 July 1973	Saratoga Springs	United States	Saratoga Performing Arts Centre	
1 August 1973	Illinois	United States	Mississippi River Festival	
23 August 1973	San Diego	United States	San Diego Sports Arena	
31 August 1973	Honolulu	United States	HIC Arena	
28 September 1973	Ann Arbor	United States	Crisler Arena	
29 September 1973	Purdue University	United States	Mackey Arena	
4 October 1973	San Francisco	United States	Winterland Arena	CSNY reunite for acoustic set
5 October 1973	Sacramento	United States	Sacramento Memorial Auditorium	
6 October 1973	Long Beach	United States	Long Beach Arena	Crosby Guests
7 October 1973	San Francisco	United States	Winterland Arena	CSN reunite for acoustic set
12 October 1973	Illinois	United States	SIU Arena	5,024
13 October 1973	Columbus	United States	St John Arena	

Manassas

- Stephen Stills - guitar, piano, bass, vocals
- Dallas Taylor - drums
- Chris Hillman - guitar, bass, mandolin, vocals
- Joe Lala - percussion, vocals
- Al Perkins – guitar, pedal steel guitar, banjo
- Calvin "Fuzzy" Samuel – bass, vocals
- Paul Harris – piano

Setlist

Typical tour Setlist

All songs written by Stephen Stills, except where noted.

Electric set I

1. "Song of Love"
2. "Rock and Roll Crazies"/ "Cuban Bluegrass" (Stills/ Dallas Taylor, Stills/Joe Lala)
3. "Jet Set (Sigh)"
4. "Anyway"
5. "So You Want to Be a Rock 'n' Roll Star" (Roger McGuinn, Chris Hillman)
6. "Johnny's Garden"
7. "Go Back Home"

Acoustic set

1. "Six Days on the Road" (Dave Dudley)
2. "Safe at Home" (Chris Hillman)
3. "Fallen Eagle"
4. "Hide It So Deep"
5. "You're Still on My Mind" (Luke McDaniel)

Electric set II

1. "Pensamiento"
2. "49 Bye-Byes"/"For What It's Worth"
3. "Lies" (Chris Hillman)
4. "The Treasure"
5. "Carry On"
6. "Find the Cost of Freedom"
