= Stills (Stephen Stills album) =

Studio album by Stephen Stills
- Released: June 23, 1975
- Recorded: 1971, 1973–1975
- Studios: Criteria, Miami; The Record Plant, Los Angeles; The Record Plant, Sausalito; Island, London
- Genre: Rock
- Length: 38:19
- Label: Columbia
- Producers: Stephen Stills with Bill Halverson and The Albert Brothers

Stephen Stills chronology
Down the Road (1973)	Stills (1975)	Stephen Stills Live (1975)

Singles from Stills
- 1. "Turn Back the Pages" / "Shuffle Just as Bad" Released: August 8, 1975

Stills is the fifth studio album by the American musician Stephen Stills. It is his first release on Columbia Records and first since the dissolution of his previous band Manassas. The album was a commercial success on release, charting at number 19 on the US album charts, but was released to mixed critical reaction.

== Background ==
Stills began recording a solo album in 1973 under the tentative title As I Come of Age, and it was "almost completed" by February 1974. He may have recorded more in early 1974, but from May to December Stills was busy with a reunited Crosby, Stills, Nash and Young. Stills signed with Columbia early in 1975 and turned in this album, "a collection of tracks Stephen had been working on over the preceding several years" including "much of the material recorded for As I Come of Age". He recorded an early unissued version of "Guardian Angel" on January 23, 1975, at The Record Plant; the next day Crosby and Nash joined him.

== Content ==
The piano and drum tracks by Stills and Ringo Starr for "As I Come of Age" date back to 1971, while "Turn Back the Pages" was recorded in 1975. Although "My Angel" is credited to Stills and Dallas Taylor, and Stills calls it a "jam on a set of Dallas' changes", Stills recorded a demo of the song in March 1967. "First Things First" written by Stills and the bass player for Three Dog Night Joe Schermie and was played quite frequently along with the 'Myth of Sisyphus' and 'My Angel' on the CSNY 1974 tour.

The cover photo was shot at Neil Young's Broken Arrow Ranch during rehearsals for the CSNY 1974 tour. The back cover features Donnie Dacus and Stills playing acoustic guitars together.

As per the sleeve notes:

"Turn Back the Pages". 1975, Cut late in sessions, at Criteria, with Ron and Howie.

"My Favourite Changes". 1974, The track was cut in Sausalito with Stephen and Don Dacus playing guitars in the control booth and Leland Skar and Lala playing gin the studio. Danny Hutton put some vocals on it. Later in Colorado vocals were completed by Stephen, Kenny and Peggy Clinger.

"My Angel". 1974, Jam on a set of Dallas' changes edited into a song. Dallas played drums, Lala percussion. Stephen played bass, piano, clavinet and organ. Thanks to Sylvester.

"In the Way". 1974, Track cut live in studio in Sausalito and then Kenny recut the bass. Vocals, recorded by Jeff Geurico at Caribou, are Stephen, Don, and Kenny.

"Love Story". 1973, Back track is Russ on drums, Leland bass, Stephen piano. Organ and electric piano overdubs are also Stephen. Vocals, are Stephen, Rick, and Kenny and Don. Tried strings but to no avail. The vocals took twenty hours. The track took two hours. The song sat for four years before it was recorded.

"To Mama from Christopher and the Old Man". 1975.. Christopher was written after a long session where 7am caught Papa coming in the door just after Christopher was getting up and we hung out for a while. Cut the song that night and ended up with me and a drummer. Cut the basic, bass and second rhythm, then Tubby overdubbed the drums, with Stills hanging over his shoulder with a tambourine. We got smokin' and did it in eight hours, including mix down.

"First Things First". 1973. Dallas Taylor played drums, Joe Lala on percussion. Vocals are by Stephen, Kenny Passarelli, David Crosby and Graham Nash. A touch of Patoi.

"New Mama", 1973. Neil says this one his own way. The basic for this version was Leland on bass, Russ drums, Lala percussion and Stephen playing guitar and electric guitar simultaneously. Only instrument overdub is additional guitar by Don. Vocals are Stephen, Rick and Don.

"As I Come of Age", 1973. Track cut on London in 1971 with Stephen on piano and Ringo on drums. Stephen overdubbed organ and bass. Lead guitar is Don and vocals are by Crosby, Stills and Nash.

"Shuffle Just as Bad", 1974. Russ played drums, Jerry piano and organ. Stephen played bass on the basic and overdubbed guitar and electric piano. Vocals are by Stephen and Kenny.

"Cold Cold World", 1975. Another Donnie and Stephen collaboration, with Stephen doing lead vocal, Donnie and Betty Wright going backups. Stills on lead and rhythm guitars as well as bass. Old friend Conrad Isidore on drums, Joe's conga and percussion, Jerry on piano and organ, Donnie on rhythm guitar. Another Criteria track with Ron and Howie.

"Myth of Sisyphus", 1974. Jimmy Fox played drums and Stephen played piano and just sang the song. Cut in Miami by the Albert Bros., first take. Don and Claudia Lanier later got background vocals together with Halverson in Los Angeles.

== Release ==
The album was released 23 June 1975, and reached No 19 on the Billboard album charts during a chart run of 17 weeks, number 11 on the Record World charts and number 12 on the Cash Box charts. The lead single from the album was "Turn Back the Pages" and charted at a disappointing No 84 on the Billboard charts. In late 1975, CBS records were quoted saying it was close to reaching Gold in the US, with sales of 400,000-450,000. A quadraphonic version was also released in 1975.

Stills, supported the album with his longest tour as a solo artist, playing arenas throughout North America.

In retrospect Stills has commented on his mid-70's solo period saying he "short-circuited for a while, things were moving too fast. I got a little crazed. Too much drinking, too many drugs. What can I say."

== Critical reception ==
Retrospective professional reviews
Review scores
Source	Rating
Allmusic	2/5 stars
Christgau's Record Guide	C
Encyclopedia of Popular Music	4/5 stars
The Rolling Stone Album Guide	1/5 stars

Critical reception to Stills was mixed to positive. Reviewing in 1975 for Rolling Stone, Bud Scoppa called it a "concerted attempt at candid expression" but one resulting in "mixed, middling results". Record World said "Stills was back with that patented mellow sound" and cited "My Angel", "First Things First", and "Shuffle Just as Bad" as highlights. Cash Box said Stills "takes his best lyrical and instrumental chops to form a springboard from which he moves easily amid different musical shades", and pointed to "As I Come of Age" as a highlight. Village Voice critic Robert Christgau was largely unenthusiastic, describing the album as the one "in which Stills recycles his 'favorite set of changes/Already good for a couple of songs.' His admirers might find that endearing, I know. They might even dig him copping a lick from Alice Cooper later on in the lyric. But me, I find it pathetic." Chris Charlesworth wrote in Melody Maker 1975, saying 'CBS came up with the cash and Stills has come up with a good album, but which in the main doesn't rank with his classics, two or three tracks excepted. It's a laid-back record, to use a hackneyed term, and deliberately underproduced to the extent where the music oozes rather than bounces from the speakers." Record Mirror, called the album on par with his debut album, or a very close second. "Full of those earlier highlights - slow build ups, full of multi tracked vocals, familiar percussion breaks". Finishing the review by saying "maybe there's no new direction, but I always thought he found it somewhere years back and got lost in between." Music Week, called it a quality effort, saying "nobody plays the laid-back West Coast music better than Stills and the instrumentation throughout is joyously and smoothly integrated", and praised 'Love Story", 'First Things First', and 'New Mama", in particular.

== Track listing ==
All tracks are written by Stephen Stills; except where indicated.

Side one
No.	Title	Writer(s)	Length
1.	"Turn Back the Pages"	Donnie Dacus, Stills	4:04
2.	"My Favorite Changes"		2:50
3.	"My Angel"	Stills, Dallas Taylor	2:25
4.	"In the Way"		3:35
5.	"Love Story"		4:11
6.	"To Mama from Christopher and the Old Man"		2:15

Side two
No.	Title	Writer(s)	Length
7.	"First Things First"	Joe Schermie, Jon Smith, Stills	2:10
8.	"New Mama"	Neil Young	2:21
9.	"As I Come of Age"		2:33
10.	"Shuffle Just as Bad"		2:39
11.	"Cold Cold World"	Dacus, Stills	4:38
12.	"Myth of Sisyphus"	Kenny Passarelli, Stills	4:28
Total length:			38:19

== Personnel ==
- Stephen Stills - Lead Vocals (1–12), Lead Guitar (1, 2, 10, 11), Rhythm Guitar (1, 6, 11), Guitar (2,10), Bass (1, 3, 6, 9–11), Piano (1, 3, 5, 9, 12), Clavinet (3), Organ (3, 5, 9), Electric Piano (5, 10), Tambourine (6)
- Donnie Dacus - Rhythm Guitar (1, 11), Guitar (2, 8), Lead Guitar (9), Vocals (1, 4, 5, 8, 11, 12)
- Tubby (Ron) Ziegler - Drums (1, 6)
- Joe Lala - Percussion (1–3, 7, 8, 11), Conga (11)
- Jerry Aeillo - Organ (1, 10, 11), Piano (10, 11)
- Marcy Levy - Vocals (1)
- Leland Sklar - Bass (2, 5, 8)
- Danny Hutton - Vocals (2)
- Kenny Passarelli - Bass (4), Vocals (2, 4, 5, 7, 10)
- Peggy Clinger - Vocals (2)
- Dallas Taylor - Drums (3, 7); co-wrote 'First Things First' under the pseudonym Jon Smith
- Russ Kunkel - Drums (5, 8, 10)
- Rick Roberts - Vocals (5, 8), Guitar (?)
- David Crosby - Vocals (7, 9)
- Graham Nash - Vocals (7, 9)
- Ringo Starr - Drums (9)
- Betty Wright - Vocals (11)
- Conrad Isidore - Drums (11)
- Jimmy Fox - Drums (12)
- Claudia Lennear - Vocals (12)
- George Terry - Guitar, Vocals (named on the sleeve but not credited under any song)

Technical personnel

- Produced and arranged by Stephen Stills with Bill Halverson and Ron and Howie Albert.
- Engineers - Bill Halverson, The Albert Brothers, Jeff Guerico, Don Gehman, Stephen Stills
- Mix down Engineers - Stephen Stills, The Albert Brothers
- Mastering – Robert Margouleff
- Mastering Engineer - Alex Sadkin
- Mastering - Robert Margouleff
- Management - Michael John Bowen
- Front cover photography - Joel Bernstein
- Back cover photography - Bill Ray
- Design - John Berg, Andy Engel

== Charts ==
Chart performance for Stills
Chart (1975)	Peak position
Australia (Kent Music Report)	73
US Billboard Top LPs & Tape	19
UK Album Charts	33
Canadian RPM 100 Albums	25
Norwegian VG-lista Albums	19
French Album Charts	15
US Cash Box Top 100 Albums	12
US Record World Album Chart	11

Chart performance for "Turn Back the Pages"
Chart (1975)	Peak position
US Billboard Hot 100	84
US Top Singles (Record World)	115
US Top Singles (Cash Box)	76

== Tour ==
Stephen Stills 1975 Tour
- Tour by Stephen Stills
- Start date: June 20, 1975
- End date: December 10, 1975
- Legs: 2

Stephen Stills concert chronology
- Stephen Stills 1974 Theater Tour; Stephen Stills 1975 Tour; The Stills-Young Band Tour

The Stephen Stills 1975 Tour was a concert tour by American musician Stephen Stills, in support of his 1975 album, Stills. This was Stills biggest tour as a solo artist playing across North America. It was in support of his successful 1975 album, Stills, which he had just left Atlantic records and signed with Columbia Records with. During the tour he played to around 10,000 seater arenas. Reviews of the shows well mixed. The 8th December 1975 date at the Paramount Theatre, Seattle was professionally recorded. A version of "Know You Got to Run", recorded then, was used on Stills' Carry On boxset.

1975 Summer Tour
Date	City	Country	Venue	Gross/Notes
20 June 1975	Clarkston	United States	Pine Knob Music Theatre	Sold Out
21 June 1975	Clarkston	United States	Pine Knob Music Theatre	Sold Out
23 June 1975	Rochester	United States	Dome Arena	
24 June 1975	Kutztown	United States	Schaeffer Auditorium	
28 June 1975	Tanglewood	United States	Tanglewood Theatre	8,500
29 June 1975	New York	United States	Saratoga Performing Arts Festival	10,000
1 July 1975	Edwardsville	United States	Mississippi River Festival	7,300
2 July 1975	Fort Wayne	United States	Fort Wayne Coliseum	
3 July 1975	Chicago	United States	Arie Crown Theatre	
4 July 1975	Green Bay	United States	Brown County Arena	
5 July 1975	Schereville	United States	Omni 41	
6 July 1975	Milwaukee	United States	Milwaukee Auditorium	
9 July 1975	Omaha	United States	Civic Arena	
10 July 1975	Minneapolis	United States	Minneapolis Auditorium	3,600
12 July 1975	Kansas City	United States	Memorial Hall	
13 July 1975	Oklahoma City	United States	State Fair Arena	
15 July 1975	Fort Worth	United States	Tarrant County Convention Centre	6,000
17 July 1975	Denver	United States	Red Rocks Amphitheatre	9,000/9,000
18 July 1975	Albuquerque	United States		
19 July 1975	Tucson	United States	Tucson Arena	
22 July 1975	San Diego	United States	San Diego Sports Arena	Sold Out
23 July 1975	Toronto	Canada	Royal York Hotel	CBS Records Showcase
25 July 1975	Los Angeles	United States	Hollywood Bowl	
26 July 1975	Berkeley	United States	Greek Theatre	5,600 Neil Young Guests
27 July 1975	Sacramento	United States	Sacramento Convention Center	
29 July 1975	Fresno	United States	Selland Arena	
30 July 1975	Bakersfield	United States	Bakersfield Civic Auditorium	
3 August 1975	Honolulu	Hawaii	HIC	
4 August 1975	Honolulu	Hawaii	HIC	
9 August 1975	Portland	United States		
12 August 11975	Seattle	United States	Paramount Theatre	
1975 Winter Tour
25 October 1975	Pittsburgh	United States	Syria Mosque	
26 October 1975	Scranton	United States	John Long Center	
27 October 1975	New York City	United States	Brooklyn College	
29 October 1975	Passaic	United States	Capitol Theatre	
30 October 1975	Boston	United States	Music Hall	
1 November 1975	Annapolis	United States	Naval Academy Field House	
2 November 1975	Hempstead	United States	Hofstra Playhouse	
4 November 1975	Albany	United States	Palace Theatre	
6 November 1975	Villanova	United States	Villanova Field House	
7 November 1975	Blacksburg	United States	Cassell Coliseum	
8 November 1975	Charlottesville	United States	University Hall	
9 November 1975	Washington	United States		
12 November 1975	Chapel Hill	United States	Carmichael Theatre	
14 November 1975	Miami	United States	Doak S. Campbell Stadium	
15 November 1975	Nashville	United States	Memorial Gymnasium	
20 November 1975	California	United States	Cal Poly Gym	
21 November 1975	Sacramento	United States	University of Davis Freeborn Hall	2 Shows
22 November 1975	Palo Alto	United States	Maples Pavilion	Neil Young Guests
23 November 1975	Los Angeles	United States	Pauley Pavilion	9,500/10,000 Neil Young Guests
25 November 1975	Reno	United States	University Of Nevada	
2 December 1975	Salt Lake City	United States	Special Events Theatre	
5 December 1975	Idaho	United States	Idaho State University Minidome	
6 December 1975	Missoula	United States	Harry Adams Field House	
8 December 1975	Seattle	United States	Paramount Theatre	
9 December 1975	Portland	United States	Paramount Theatre	
10 December 1975	Oregon	United States	Gill Coliseum	

Personnel

1975 Summer Tour

- Stephen Stills - Vocals, Guitar, Piano
- Donnie Dacus - Guitar
- Joe Lala - Percussion
- Jerry Aeillo - Organ
- George Perry - Bass
- Ronald "Tubby" Zeigler - Drums
- Rick Roberts - Guitar

1975 Winter Tour

- Stephen Stills - Vocals, Guitar
- Donnie Dacus - Vocals, Guitar
- Joe Lala - Percussion
- George Perry - Bass
- Ronald "Tubby" Zeigler - Drums
- Jerry Aeillo - Keyboards

Setlist

1975 Summer Tour

All songs written by Stephen Stills, except where noted.

1. Love the One You're With
2. Johnny's Garden
3. Closer to You
4. Wooden Ships (Stills, David Crosby, Paul Kantner)
5. Change Partners
6. Know You Got to Run (Stills, John Hopkins)
7. Treetop Flyer
8. Myth of Sisyphus
9. Everybody's Talkin' (Freddie Neil)
10. Crossroads/ You Can't Catch Me (Robert Johnson, Chuck Berry)
11. 4+20
12. Do for the Others
13. Word Game
14. Buyin' Time
15. Going to the Country
16. Colorado
17. In the Way
18. Black Queen
19. The Loner (Neil Young)
20. Turn Back the Pages (Stills, Donnie Dacus)
21. New Mama (Neil Young)
22. The Treasure
23. Suite: Judy Blue Eyes
24. Find the Cost of Freedom

1975 Winter Tour

All songs written by Stephen Stills, except where noted.

1. Love the One You're With
2. Johnny's Garden
3. Closer to You (Stills, Dacus)
4. In the Way
5. Wooden Ships (Stills, David Crosby, Paul Kantner)
6. Change Partners
7. Know You Got to Run (Stills, John Hopkins)
8. Treetop Flyer
9. Myth of Sisyphus
10. Everybody's Talkin' (Freddie Neil)
11. Crossroads/ You Can't Catch Me (Robert Johnson, Chuck Berry)
12. 4+20
13. Do for the Others
14. Word Game
15. Instrumental/Band intros/Jam
16. Buyin' Time
17. Going to the Country
18. Black Queen
19. The Loner (Neil Young)
20. Turn Back the Pages (Stills, Donnie Dacus)
21. The Treasure
22. Suite: Judy Blue Eyes
23. Find the Cost of Freedom
