= Stephen Stills Live =

Live album by Stephen Stills
- Released: December 4, 1975
- Recorded: March 8–9, 1974
- Venues: Auditorium Theatre, Chicago, Illinois
- Genre: Rock
- Length: 34:55
- Label: Atlantic
- Producer: Stephen Stills

Stephen Stills chronology
Stills (1975)	Stephen Stills Live (1975)	Illegal Stills (1976)

Professional ratings
Review scores
Source	Rating
Allmusic	3/5 stars

Stephen Stills Live is a live album by Stephen Stills, released on Atlantic Records in 1975. Recorded on his first solo tour since 1971 and released after he had signed to Columbia Records. It peaked at number 42 on the US charts.

== Background and recording ==
Taken from live recordings in 1974, it was issued by Atlantic Records after Stills had left the label for Columbia Records. It peaked at #42 on the Billboard 200, and is currently out of print. It was recorded during his first solo tour in three years after the break up of Manassas. Atlantic recorded both nights of Stills' concerts at Auditorium Theatre, Chicago, for a potential live album. Tom Dowd mixed the album in November 1975 at Caribou Ranch. The first side of the album is Stills with an electric band, and the second side of the album is Stills on his own playing acoustically. "Four Days Gone" and "Special Care" are songs written by Stills and recorded by Buffalo Springfield. He combined the Manassas song "Jet Set (Sigh)" with Joe Walsh's similarly sounding hit "Rocky Mountain Way" on the electric side. On the acoustic side he did a cover of Robert Johnson's "Crossroads" segueing into Chuck Berry's "You Can't Catch Me". Also included is the first release of Stills' cover of Fred Neil's "Everybody's Talkin' at Me" which had been recorded, but not released for the debut Crosby Stills & Nash album.

== Track listing ==
All tracks are written by Stephen Stills, except where noted.

Side one: Electric side
No.	Title	Writer(s)	Length
1.	"Wooden Ships"	David Crosby, Stephen Stills, Paul Kantner	6:32
2.	"Four Days Gone"		3:55
3.	"Jet Set (Sigh) /Rocky Mountain Way/Jet Set (Sigh)"	Stills/Rocke Grace, Joe Walsh, Joe Vitale, Kenny Passarelli/Stills	5:26
4.	"Special Care"		3:35

Side two: Acoustic side
No.	Title	Writer(s)	Length
1.	"Change Partners"		2:53
2.	"Crossroads/You Can't Catch Me"	Robert Johnson/Chuck Berry	4:41
3.	"Everybody's Talkin' at Me"	Fred Neil	2:42
4.	"4 + 20"		2:27
5.	"Word Game"		4:07
Total length:			34:55

== Personnel ==
Side One: Electric Side

- Stephen Stills - vocals, guitar (except track 2), piano (track 2)
- Donnie Dacus - guitar, backing vocals
- Jerry Aiello - Hammond organ
- Kenny Passarelli - bass, backing vocals
- Russ Kunkel - drums
- Joe Lala - percussion (except track 2)

Side Two: Acoustic Side

- Stephen Stills - vocals & acoustic guitar

Technical personnel

- Tom Dowd, Don Gehmen, & Michael John Bowen - Mixed and edited Oct 1975 at Caribou Ranch, Nederland, Colorado
- Recorded live by Bill Halverson
- Photography - Stephen Sanders
- Management, Cover Concept and Design - Michael John Bowen

== Charts ==
Chart performance for Stephen Stills Live
Chart (1975–1976)	Peak position
US Billboard Top LPs & Tape	42
Canadian RPM 100 Albums	96
US Cash Box Top 100 Albums	44
US Record World Album Chart	44

== Tour ==
1974 Theater Tour
- Tour by Stephen Stills
- Start date: February 6, 1974
- End date: March 9, 1974
- Legs: 1
- No. of shows: 23

Stephen Stills concert chronology
- Manassas North American Tour 1973; 1974 Theater Tour; Stephen Stills 1975 Tour

The Stephen Stills 1974 Theater Tour was a concert tour by American musician Stephen Stills. It was his first solo tour since 1971, and the first since the demise of his band Manassas. He played well respected theaters across the Mid West and the East Coast of the United States. This was Stills' first solo tour in three years, a low-key affair that started with an electric set, then an acoustic set and finishing with another electric set. The setlist contained a range of material from his Buffalo Springfield days, his first two solo albums and the CSN/Y songs. It was during this tour that Stills announced the CSNY 1974 reunion tour. A live album Stephen Stills Live was recorded during the Chicago Auditorium dates and released in December 1975. On the 22 February date in Washington, Neil Young joined Stills on stage.

1974 Theatre Tour					Attendance
Date	City	Country	Venue	Opening Act	Attendance
6 Feb 1974	Passaic	United States	Capital Theatre	Maria Muldaur	Sold Out
8 Feb 1974	New York	United States	Carnegie Hall	Maria Muldaur	Sold Out
9 Feb 1974	New York	United States	Carnegie Hall	Maria Muldaur	Sold Out
12 Feb 1974	New Haven	United States	Woolsey Hall	Maria Muldaur	Sold Out
13 Feb 1974	Boston	United States	Boston Music Hall	Maria Muldaur	Sold Out
14 Feb 1974	Boston	United States	Boston Music Hall	Maria Muldaur	Sold Out
15 Feb 1974	Burlington	United States	Patrick Gymnasium	Maria Muldaur	Sold Out
17 Feb 1974	Philadelphia	United States	Academy Of Music	Maria Muldaur	Sold Out
18 Feb 1974	Philadelphia	United States	Academy Of Music	Maria Muldaur	Sold Out
19 Feb 1974	Brookville	United States	The Dome	Maria Muldaur	Sold Out
21 Feb 1974	Richmond	United States	The Mosque	Maria Muldaur	Sold Out
22 Feb 1974	Washington	United States	JFK Center	Maria Muldaur	Sold Out
23 Feb 1974	Washington	United States	JFK Center	Maria Muldaur	Sold Out
24 Feb 1974	Pennsylvania	United States	Penn State Recreation Hall	Maria Muldaur	Sold Out
26 Feb 1974	Cleveland	United States	Music Hall	Maria Muldaur	Sold Out
27 Feb 1974	Cleveland	United States	Music Hall	Maria Muldaur	Sold Out
1 March 1974	Pittsburgh	United States	Syria Mosque	Maria Muldaur	Sold Out
2 March 1974	Lexington	United States	Memorial Coliseum	Maria Muldaur	Sold Out
3 March 1974	Indiana	United States	Indiana Convention Center	Maria Muldaur	Sold Out
5 March 1974	Detroit	United States	Masonic Temple	Maria Muldaur	Sold Out
6 March 1974	Detroit	United States	Masonic Temple	Maria Muldaur	Sold Out
8 March 1974	Chicago	United States	Auditorium Theatre	Maria Muldaur	Sold Out
9 March 1974	Chicago	United States	Auditorium Theatre	Maria Muldaur	Sold Out
