= Sit Yourself Down =

Single by Stephen Stills

from the album Stephen Stills
- B-side: "We Are Not Helpless"
- Released: 1971
- Genre: Rock
- Length: 2:40
- Label: Atlantic
- Songwriter: Stephen Stills

Stephen Stills singles chronology
"Love the One You're With" (1970)	"Sit Yourself Down" (1971)	"Change Partners" (1971)

"Sit Yourself Down" is a song written by Stephen Stills that was released on his 1970 solo debut album Stephen Stills. It was also released as the second single from the album, following the Top 20 hit "Love the One You're With." and reached the Top 40, peaking at #37.

== Music and lyrics ==
"Sit Yourself Down" has a gospel-based melody. It was inspired by Stills' new relationship with Rita Coolidge, who also provided backup vocals on the song. Five other backing vocalists were used on the bridge and refrain, including Graham Nash, David Crosby, John Sebastian and Cass Elliott. The refrain was propelled by Stills piano playing. The lyrics discuss aging, maturing and settling down. They capture Stills' conflict between wanting to push himself harder and wanting to find peace. According to author David Browne, the music, and particularly the way the lead guitar line plays off the melody, also capture Stills' conflict.

== Reception ==
Allmusic critic Matthew Greenwald called "Sit Yourself Down" "one of the more polished songs on the Stephen Stills solo album" and described the effect of the background singers combining with Stills on the bridge and refrain to be "beguiling." Allmusic's Bruce Eder praised the song's melody. Billboard called it a "steady rock ballad" that it expected to follow the chart success of "Love the One You're With," although the magazine later felt that Stills next single, "Change Partners" which ultimately missed the Top 40, had more "sales and chart potency." Cash Box described the song as having less rhythmic edge than "Love the One You're With" but that it "offers a tastier sample of his vocal strength and chorale touches to heighten the song's impact." Record World called it "another fine selection from Stills' solo session that is sure to get heavy chart action." Ultimate Classic Rock critic Nick DeRiso rated it as Still's 4th best solo song, comparing it to his Crosby, Stills & Nash song "Suite: Judy Blue Eyes" for the way it moves between sections, and also praising his "stirringly complex guitar solo."

"Sit Yourself Down" was included on Stills 1976 compilation album Still Stills: The Best of Stephen Stills.

== Cover Versions ==
- Genya Ravan covered the song on her 1972 album Genya Ravan with Baby.
- Rufus covered it in a medley with "Love the One You're With" on their 1973 debut album Rufus.
- Sha Na Na covered the song in concert.
- The Voices of East Harlem released a cover in 1971, as the b side of their "Oxford Town" single.

== Chart History ==
Chart (1971)	Peak position
Canada 100 (RPM)	24
US Hot 100 (Billboard)	37
US Singles (Cash Box)	31
US Singles (Record World)	35
