= Stephen Stills 2 =

Studio album by Stephen Stills
- Released: June 30, 1971
- Recorded: February–May 1971
- Studios: Criteria, Miami; Island, London; Wally Heider, Los Angeles
- Genres: Folk rock, rock
- Length: 43:02
- Label: Atlantic
- Producers: Stephen Stills, Bill Halverson

Stephen Stills chronology
Stephen Stills (1970)	Stephen Stills 2 (1971)	Manassas (1972)

Singles from Stephen Stills 2
- 1. "Change Partners" / "Relaxing Town" Released: 1971; 2. "Marianne" / "Nothin' to Do but Today" Released: 1971

Stephen Stills 2 is the second solo album by Stephen Stills, released on Atlantic Records in 1971. It peaked at number eight on the Billboard 200 and was certified as a gold record by the RIAA. Two singles were released from the album, both just missing the Top 40 on the Billboard Hot 100 chart: "Change Partners" peaked at number 43, while "Marianne" peaked at number 42.

== Background and recording ==
After the break up of CSNY, being busted on a swath of possession charges, overdosing on pills, and his loss of Rita Coolidge to Graham Nash, Stills became extremely prolific and wrote and recorded 23 songs for this album. It was originally intended to be a double album that included songs such as "Johnny's Garden", "Love Story", "So Begins the Task", "The Treasure", "Colorado", "Fallen Eagle", and "Rock and Roll Crazies". However, Atlantic executive Ahmet Ertegun insisted it be a single album.

Stills was influenced by the recent success of bands with horn sections, including Chicago, and Blood, Sweat, & Tears, and introduced the Memphis Horns on this album and the tour to support, despite its mixed reaction from fans.

This was the first album he recorded at Criteria Studios in Miami from February to March 1971 with the Albert Brothers, who he used for the majority of his 1970s work. Ahmet Ertegun had suggested Miami as to get away from all the drama on the West Coast. Stills started work on the album while his first album had only just been released a month prior. This album was released only six months after his first album.

It was during this time that Stills would hold marathon recording sessions for three months while recording the album, employing two teams of studio engineers working shifts around the clock just to keep up with him. Jerry Garcia recalled that Stills flew him to Miami for a week to record pedal steel on "Change Partners" saying "I did sessions at the weirdest hours... the way he worked in the studio was totally crazy, but at the time he was really happening. He just accumulated endless tracks." Engineer Howard Albert recalled "he turned up to his very first session at 2 am on the very night he landed in town. We didn't know he was coming and we were in the middle of making a Johnny Winter album. Lucky for us, there were two of us because Stephen wanted to start straight away".

== Content ==
The lyrics were printed on the inside of the gatefold cover in red, on a background photograph of Stephen Stills in a mountainous outdoor setting pointing into the distance. There were numerous errors in the original printing of the lyrics, which necessitated that Atlantic issue the album with a large sticker affixed to the shrink wrap of the back cover with the corrections to the lyrics. Later editions of the album had corrected lyrics inside the gatefold and thus did not include a correction sticker on the album.

"Singin' Call" which had been demoed for Déjà Vu was written about Rita Coolidge. Stills was inspired to write "Word Game" after watching a documentary film about apartheid and musically influenced by Bob Dylan's "It's Alright, Ma (I'm Only Bleeding)". "Fishes and Scorpions", which featured Stills and Eric Clapton on guitars, was recorded during the recording sessions for his first album. "Relaxing Town" expresses disconnect with the narrator wanting to settle down in a relaxing town away from the revolution. It contains a reference to Jerry Rubin, one of the Chicago Seven, and Mayor Daley.

== Aftermath ==
Stills had already performed "Bluebird Revisited" on tour with Crosby, Stills, Nash, & Young in 1969 including at Woodstock.

Stills undertook a 52-date tour called The Memphis Horns Tour in the summer of 1971 to support the album; members included the Memphis Horns along with CSNY bass player Calvin "Fuzzy" Samuel and CSNY drummer Dallas Taylor. The tour encompassed a variety of formats and moods from solo acoustic confessionals and folk duets to rock anthems and big band R&B. The tour was not very well-received, with some blaming Stills' lack of confidence. On the opening night in Seattle only 3,000 people attended out 15,000 as the Boeing factory had just closed. With this fact and his recent split from Coolidge severely knocking his confidence, Stills started drinking, hence the tour's nickname "the Drunken Horns Tour". However, Stills has also said there were good nights like the night he sold out Madison Square Garden, though this was overshadowed by the Concert for Bangladesh just a day later, for which Stills had donated his stage, sound, lighting system and production manager, although he was not invited to play at the event. Also a roadie died on stage after plummeting from the rigging at MSG, then a few days later Stills fell off a motorcycle and finished the tour in a brace requiring David Crosby to help him finish the last few dates of the tour. Stills had been promising a massive tour since his first album saying it would be 'a real road show - the biggest since Ray Charles hit the stage'; however early on in the tour he commented saying it was a marathon where you watch the singer bleed trying to sing 18 songs in a row. Due to these issues Stills has a negative perception of the tour. It was during this tour that Stills met with the Flying Burrito Brothers' Chris Hillman and the beginnings of Manassas took place.

He later re-recorded two songs from this album: "Singin' Call" for his 1991 album Stills Alone, and "Word Game" for the 2013 album by blues supergroup The Rides. He also reworked the song "Know You Got to Run", adding on a chorus to change it into "Open Up", a song which he never recorded himself, but instead gave to REO Speedwagon, who recorded it for their album Ridin' the Storm Out.

By 1974, according to Rolling Stone magazine the album had sold an estimated 600,000 copies.

== Reception ==
Professional ratings
Review scores
Source	Rating
AllMusic	3.5/5 stars
The Encyclopedia of Popular Music	4/5 stars
The Village Voice	C

Contemporary reception was mixed to positive with John Mendelsohn of Rolling Stone describing Stills as "a solid second-rate artist who so many lower-middlebrows insist on believing is actually first-rate" and his post-Buffalo Springfield work collectively as "fifth-rate self-indulgence". Of Stephen Stills 2 specifically he commented, "the words to Stills 2 are alternately trivial, cloyingly self-important, and downright offensive, the music is decidedly lackluster and undistinguished, and the production of the whole shebang is so distant from up to snuff that one is hard pressed to get much impression at all of the playing of the latter."

In a positive review Nick Logan reviewing for the NME, 1971 said "The heartfelt plea to know the reason for the pain in 'Open Secret', among the set's best tracks, saves itself from tumbling into a self pitying abyss because the 'pain' is not specified but universal".

Robert Christgau, in 1971, said, "Stills is of course detestable, the ultimate rich hippie--arrogant, self-pitying, sexist, shallow. Unfortunately, he's never quite communicated all this on a record, but now he's approaching his true level. Flashes of brilliant ease remain--the single, "Marianne," is very nice, especially if you don't listen too hard to the lyrics—but there's also a lot of stuff on the order of an all-male chorus with jazzy horns singing "It's disgusting" in perfect tuneful unison, and straight, I swear. Keep it up, SS—it'll be a pleasure to watch you fail."

In a positive review Bill McAllister, writing in August 1971 for Record Mirror, called the album "more personal" than his first due to the fewer number of other musicians, and "absorbing while reaching out further, which it should". He summarised his review by saying "Like his 'Bluebird', Stephen Stills knows how to fly".

Record World called the single "Marianne" Stills' "most commercial sounding single since 'Love the One You're With.'" Cash Box called it Stills' "best solo effort to date."

== Track listing ==
All tracks are written by Stephen Stills, except "Know You Got to Run", co-written by John Hopkins.

Side one
No.	Title	Length
1.	"Change Partners"	3:13
2.	"Nothin' to Do but Today"	2:40
3.	"Fishes and Scorpions"	3:13
4.	"Sugar Babe"	4:04
5.	"Know You Got to Run"	3:50
6.	"Open Secret"	5:00

Side two
No.	Title	Length
1.	"Relaxing Town"	2:20
2.	"Singin' Call"	3:01
3.	"Ecology Song"	3:22
4.	"Word Game"	4:13
5.	"Marianne"	2:27
6.	"Bluebird Revisited"	5:23
Total length:		43:02

== Personnel ==
- Stephen Stills – vocals, guitars, keyboards, bass guitar
- Nils Lofgren – guitars, keyboards, backing vocals
- Eric Clapton – electric guitar on "Fishes and Scorpions"
- Paul Harris, Billy Preston, Dr. John – keyboards
- Calvin "Fuzzy" Samuel – bass
- Conrad Isidore, Dallas Taylor – drums
- Gasper Lawal, Rocky Dijon – congas
- David Crosby, Henry Diltz, Fred Neil as "Fearless Freddy" – backing vocals
- Jerry Garcia – pedal steel guitar on "Change Partners" (uncredited)

The Memphis Horns

- Roger Hopps, Wayne Jackson – trumpets
- Jack Helm – trombone
- Sidney George, Ed Logan, Andrew Love – tenor saxophone
- James Mitchell, Floyd Newman – baritone saxophone

Technical Personnel

- Stephen Stills - Production, arranged and conducted
- Bill Halverson - Production, engineer
- Richard Digby Smith, The Albert Brothers - assistants
- Gary Burden - Art direction / Design
- Henry Diltz - Photography
- The Geffen Roberts Management Company - direction

== Charts ==
Album

Chart performance for Stephen Stills 2
Chart (1971)	Peak position
US Billboard Top LPs	8
UK Album Charts	22
Canadian RPM 100 Albums	11
Norwegian VG-lista Albums	7
Swedish Kvällstoppen Chart	5
Australian Go-Set Top 20 Albums	19
Dutch MegaCharts Albums	2
US Cash Box Top 100 Albums	6
US Record World Album Chart	8

Year-end charts

Chart (1971)	Position
US Billboard Year-End	41
US Cashbox Year-End	51
Dutch MegaCharts Albums	27

Singles

Sales chart performance for singles from Stephen Stills 2
Year	Single	Chart	Position
1971	"Change Partners"	US Billboard Hot 100	43
1971	"Change Partners"	Canada Top Singles (RPM)	42
1971	"Change Partners"	Netherlands (Single Top 100)	22
1971	"Change Partners"	US Top Singles (Cash Box)	38
1971	"Change Partners"	US Top Singles (Record World)	40
1971	"Marianne"	US Billboard Hot 100	42
1971	"Marianne"	Canada Top Singles (RPM)	17
1971	"Marianne"	Netherlands (Single Top 100)	28
1971	"Marianne"	US Top Singles (Cash Box)	31
1971	"Marianne"	US Top Singles (Record World)	33

== Certification ==
Region	Certification	Certified units/sales
United States (RIAA)	Gold	500,000^{^}
^{^} Shipments figures based on certification alone.

== Memphis Horns Tour ==
1971 Memphis Horns Tour
- Tour by Stephen Stills
- Start date: July 3, 1971
- End date: August 21, 1971
- Legs: 1
- No. of shows: 52

Stephen Stills concert chronology
- 1971 Memphis Horns Tour; Manassas World Tour 1972

The Stephen Stills 1971 North American Tour was a concert tour by American musician Stephen Stills, informally known as the Memphis Horns or Drunken Horns tour. It was in support of Stephen Stills 2, and the first solo tour of his career. Members included the Memphis Horns along with CSNY bass player Calvin Samuel and CSNY drummer Dallas Taylor. All concerts were in 1971 and in the United States. The Madison Square Garden show was professionally recorded and filmed for a future release, as seen and said on an episode of The Old Grey Whistle Test where Stills plays a live version of "Go Back Home". Two songs recorded here were also used on his Carry On box set - "Find the Cost of Freedom", and "Do for the Others" featuring Steven Fromholz. It was during this tour he played to 20,000 fans at the Los Angeles Sports Arena, as mentioned in the Manassas song "Don't Look At My Shadow", released in 1972. A live album recorded during the last two nights of the tour was released in 2023 as Live At Berkeley 1971.

Date	City	Country	Venue	Attendance	Notes
27 June 1971	Mcrea	United States	Celebration of Life Festival	150,000	Headlined, not part of the main tour, played without the Memphis Horns
Memphis Horns Tour
2 July 1971	~~Portland~~	United States	~~Memorial Coliseum~~		Postponed
3 July 1971	Seattle	United States	Seattle Center Coliseum		
5 July 1971	Portland	United States	Memorial Coliseum		
6 July 1971	Morrison	United States	Red Rocks Amphitheatre		
8 July 1971	Houston	United States	Sam Houston Coliseum		
9 July 1971	San Antonio	United States	Municipal Auditorium		
11 July 1971	Dallas	United States	Dallas Memorial Auditorium		
12 July 1971	Kansas City	United States	Municipal Auditorium		
14 July 1971	Omaha	United States	Civic Auditorium		
16 July 1971	Chicago	United States	International Amphitheatre		
17 July 1971	St. Louis	United States	Kiel Auditorium		
20 July 1971	Cleveland	United States	Public Auditorium		
21 July 1971	Detroit	United States	Olympia Stadium	6,000	
23 July 1971	Cincinnati	United States	Cincinnati Gardens		
24 July 1971	Pittsburgh	United States	Civic Arena	10,517	
27 July 1971	Boston	United States	Boston Garden	15,000	
28 July 1971	Philadelphia	United States	The Spectrum		
30 July 1971	New York City	United States	Madison Square Garden	21,000/21,000	Graham Nash guests
1 August 1971	Columbia	United States	Merriweather Post Pavilion	14,000	
3 August 1971	Louisville	United States	Fairgrounds Stadium		
5 August 1971	Oklahoma City	United States	Fairgrounds Arena	6,000	
7 August 1971	~~Minneapolis~~	United States	~~Minneapolis Auditorium~~		Cancelled due to motorcycle accident
9 August 1971	~~Denver~~	United States	~~Denver Coliseum~~		Postponed
10 August 1971	Salt Lake City	United States	Salt Palace		
11 August 1971	Denver	United States	Denver Coliseum		
12 August 1971	Oakland	United States	Oakland-Alameda County Coliseum		
14 August 1971	Phoenix	United States	Arizona Veterans Memorial Coliseum		
15 August 1971	San Diego	United States	San Diego Sports Arena		
18 August 1971	Inglewood	United States	The Forum	Sold Out	David Crosby guests
20 August 1971	Berkeley	United States	Berkeley Community Theatre		David Crosby guests
21 August 1971	Berkeley	United States	Berkeley Community Theatre		David Crosby guests

Personnel

- Stephen Stills – vocal, guitar, keyboards
- Steven Fromholz – guitar, vocals
- Paul Harris – keyboards
- Calvin "Fuzzy" Samuels – bass guitar
- Dallas Taylor – drums
- Joe Lala – percussion
- The Memphis Horns – horn section (Wayne Jackson, Roger Hopps, Jack Hale, Andrew Love, Sidney George, Floyd Newman)

Tour Setlist

This is the setlist from the show at the Los Angeles Forum, August 18, 1971.

All songs written by Stephen Stills, except where noted.

1. "Rock and Roll Woman"
2. "Questions"
3. "Helplessly Hoping"
4. "Fishes and Scorpions"
5. "Go Back Home"
6. "Love the One You're With"
7. "Black Queen"
8. "Change Partners"
9. "Know You Got to Run" (Stills, John Hopkins)
10. "Word Game"
11. "Do for the Others"
12. "I'd Have to Be Crazy" (Steven Fromholz)
13. "Texas Train Ride" (Steven Fromholz)
14. "Jesus Gave Love Away For Free"
15. "You Don't Have to Cry"
16. "49 Bye-Byes/For What It's Worth"
17. "Ecology Song"
18. "Open Secret"
19. "Lean On Me Baby" (Wayne Jackson)
20. "Bluebird Revisited"
21. "Cherokee"
22. "How Long"
23. "Find the Cost of Freedom"
