= Dallas Taylor (drummer) =

American rock drummer (1948–2015)

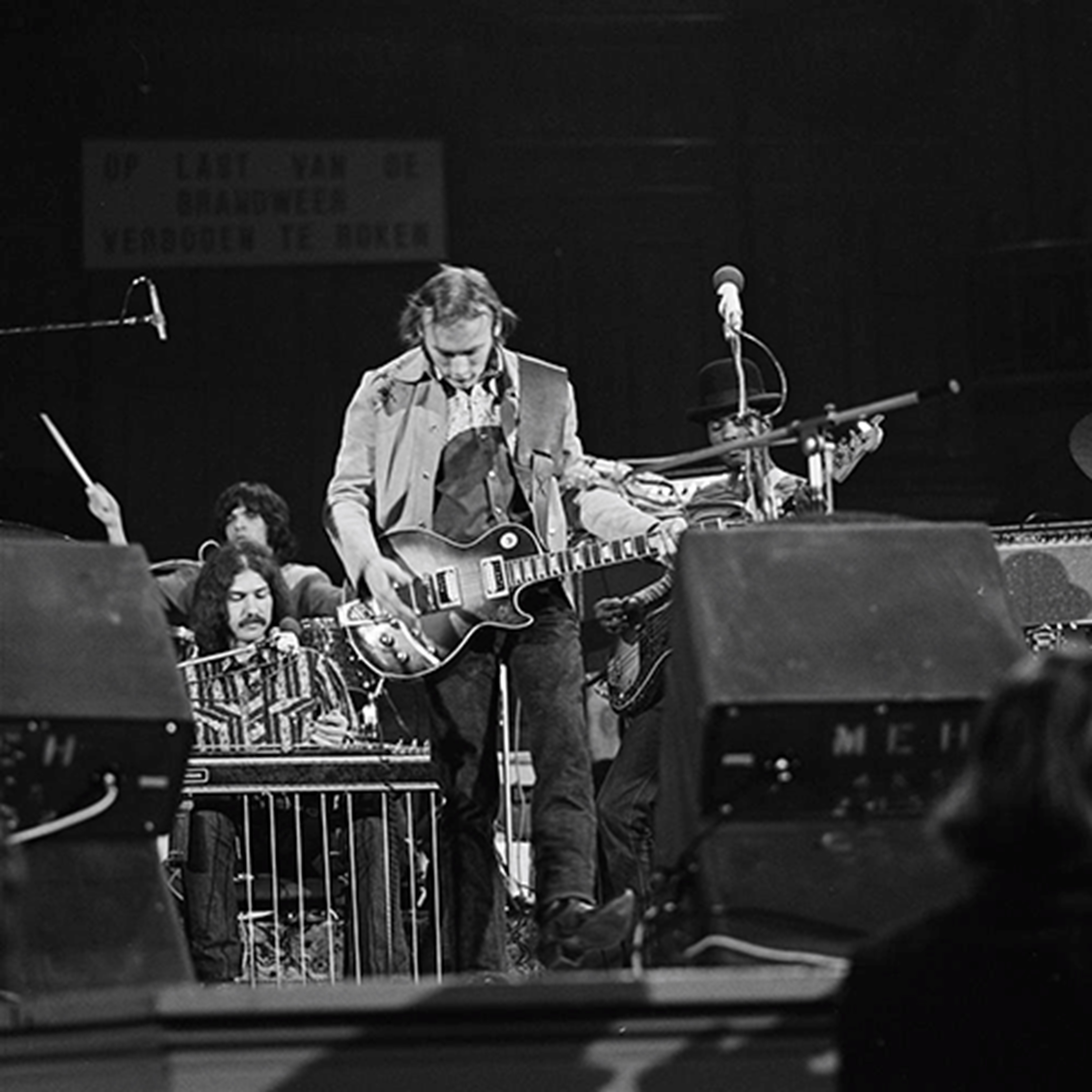
- Taylor (background) playing drums in the band Manassas, with Al Perkins, Stephen Stills, and Fuzzy Samuel

Background information
- Born: Dallas Woodrow Taylor Jr. April 7, 1948; Denver, Colorado, U.S.
- Origin: San Antonio, Texas, U.S.
- Died: January 18, 2015 (aged 66) Los Angeles, California, U.S.
- Genres: Rock and roll; country rock
- Occupation: Drummer
- Years active: 1960s–2015

Dallas Woodrow Taylor Jr. (April 7, 1948 – January 18, 2015) was an American session drummer who played drums on several rock albums in the 1960s and 1970s.

== Life and career ==
Taylor was born in Denver but grew up in Phoenix and San Antonio, Texas, where he played with Shades McRay and the Invictas. His seminal musical influence was jazz drummer Gene Krupa. Taylor dropped out of high school and moved to California where he achieved some success with the psychedelic rock band Clear Light in the late 1960s, but is best remembered as the drummer on Crosby, Stills and Nash's debut album, and their follow-up with Neil Young, Déjà Vu (1970), and was given a front-sleeve credit along with Motown bassist Greg Reeves.

As well as appearing on Stephen Stills's eponymous first solo album in 1970, his 1971 follow up Stephen Stills 2, and the supporting tour with the Memphis Horns, Taylor was the drummer for Stills's group Manassas in 1972 and 1973. He also appeared on Stills's 1975 solo album Stills. In 1974 he played with Van Morrison at the 1974 Montreux Jazz Festival in a quartet along with keyboardist Pete Wingfield and bassist Jerome Rimson, a performance issued on the 2006 DVD, Live at Montreux 1980/1974. He briefly appeared again in the mid 1970s, drumming for Paul Butterfield's touring band.

He also appeared on Graham Nash's 1971 debut Songs For Beginners, and played percussion on the Byrds' 1973 reunion album Byrds, further connecting him to CSNY.

After overcoming drug addiction, Taylor became a drug counselor in California. He said, “I was one of the lucky ones. I managed to destroy my music, but none of my suicide attempts worked.” In 1994, he spoke to Kurt Cobain when Cobain briefly checked himself into the Exodus Recovery Center where Taylor was working. Taylor published a memoir, Prisoner of Woodstock, in 1994.

After he was diagnosed with liver disease in 1989, musicians held a 1990 benefit concert to pay for a transplant, including David Crosby, Stephen Stills, Graham Nash and Neil Young, as well as Don Henley and Eddie Van Halen. His wife, Patti McGovern-Taylor, also donated a kidney for him in 2007. Taylor died on January 18, 2015, of complications from viral pneumonia and kidney disease, aged 66.

== Discography ==
- Clear Light – Clear Light (1967)
- Crosby, Stills & Nash – Crosby, Stills & Nash (1969)
- John B. Sebastian – John Sebastian (1970)
- Deja Vu – Crosby, Stills, Nash & Young (1970)
- Primordial Lovers – Essra Mohawk (1970)
- Stephen Stills – Stephen Stills (1970)
- Songs For Beginners – Graham Nash (1971)
- Stephen Stills 2 – Stephen Stills (1971)
- The Four of Us – John Sebastian (1971)
- Ohio Knox – Ohio Knox (1971)
- Manassas – Manassas (1972)
- Windmills – Rick Roberts (1972)
- Down The Road – Manassas (1973)
- Byrds – The Byrds (1974)
- Monkey Grip – Bill Wyman (1974)
- Stills – Stephen Stills (1975)
- Stone Alone – Bill Wyman (1976)
- Nine on a Ten Scale – Sammy Hagar (1976)
- Drinkin' TNT 'n' Smokin' Dynamite – Buddy Guy and Junior Wells (1982)
