= Bill Halverson (producer) =

American record producer and engineer (born 1942)

- Born: 1942 (age 83–84)
- Occupations: Producer, Engineer

Bill Halverson (born 1942) is an American record producer and engineer who worked on several critically acclaimed rock records of the 1960s and 1970s. He is most well known for working with Crosby, Stills, Nash & Young and their respective solo albums. His other engineering credits include Jimi Hendrix, Joe Cocker, Chuck Berry, Eric Clapton, and Emmylou Harris.

== Career ==
Halverson, a bass trombone player in the Dominguez Hills Junior College all-star jazz band, met engineer Wally Heider during a 1960 recording session at United Recording, and the two formed a friendship. Over the next four years, Halverson toured with music acts like Tex Beneke. After Halverson left Beneke's band in 1964, Heider hired him as assistant engineer at the newly opened Studio 3 in Hollywood. Later, Halverson assisted Heider in recording the 1967 Monterey Pop Festival, and eventually managed Studio 3 while Heider built Wally Heider Studios in San Francisco.

In early 1969, Halverson engineered Crosby, Stills, & Nash's self-titled debut studio album. Halverson became a freelance engineer in 1970, and relocated to Nashville in 1985. Halverson's engineering credits include Cream and Eric Clapton, CSNY members Stephen Stills and Graham Nash, Jimi Hendrix, Joe Cocker, Chuck Berry, and Emmylou Harris.

== Discography ==
=== Albums engineered ===
- 1967: The Beach Boys - Wild Honey
- 1968: Cream - Wheels Of Fire
- 1968: Pacific Gas and Electric - Get It On
- 1969: Zephyr - Zephyr
- 1969: Cream - Goodbye
- 1969: Crosby, Stills, & Nash - Crosby Stills, & Nash
- 1970: Stephen Stills - Stephen Stills
- 1970: Delaney & Bonnie - On Tour With Eric Clapton
- 1970: Cream - Live Cream
- 1970: Crosby, Stills, Nash & Young - Deja Vu
- 1970: Eric Clapton - Eric Clapton
- 1971: Stephen Stills - Stephen Stills 2
- 1971: Graham Nash - Songs For Beginners
- 1971: Bill Withers - Just As I Am
- 1971: Judee Sill - Judee SIll
- 1971: Crosby, Stills, Nash & Young - 4 Way Street
- 1972: Cream - Live Cream Vol. 2
- 1972: America - Homecoming
- 1972: Crosby & Nash - Graham Nash/ David Crosby
- 1973: Manassas - Down The Road
- 1974: Crosby, Stills, Nash & Young - So Far
- 1974: REO Speedwagon - Lost In A Dream
- 1975: Stephen Stills - Stills
- 1975: Stephen Stills - Stephen Stills Live
- 1975: Beach Boys - Spirit Of America
- 1975: Bobby Whitlock - One Of A Kind
- 1977: Kraftwerk - Trans-Europe Express
- 1977: Jack Bruce - How's Tricks
- 1977: Trans-Europe Express
- 1979: Ten Years Later: Ride On
- 1990: Jo-El Sonnier - Have a Little Faith
- 1990: Texas Tornados - Texas Tornados
- 1994 Flaco Jiménez - Flaco Jiménez
- 1996: Acumen - Out of Balance
- 1999: Crosby, Stills, Nash & Young - Looking Forward
