= The Albert Brothers =

American record production duo

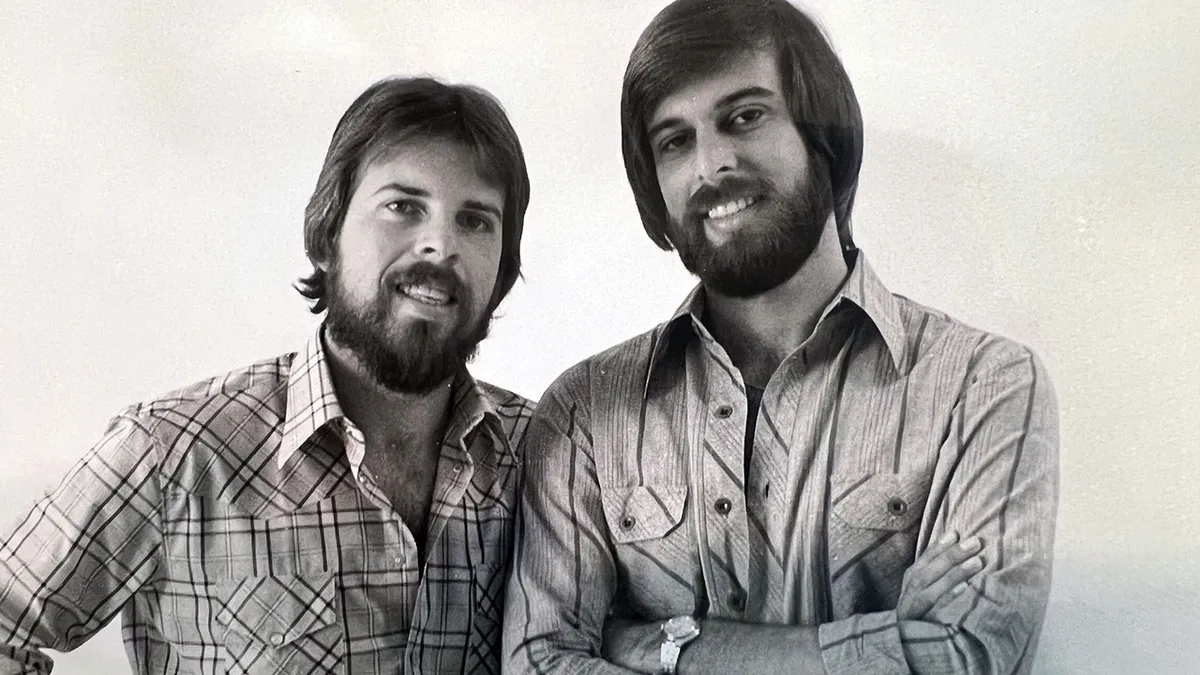
Ron (L) and Howard (R) Albert in the 1970's.

Ron and Howard Albert, known as the Albert Brothers, are an American record production duo best known for their work in audio engineering and as record producers, working first at Criteria Studios, and later Audio Vision Studios, both in Miami, Florida. Their immense and respected body of work spanning nearly seven decades includes influential albums such as Layla and Other Assorted Love Songs by Derek and the Dominos, Eat a Peach and Idlewild South by The Allman Brothers Band, Young, Gifted and Black by Aretha Franklin, The History of Eric Clapton by Eric Clapton, Manassas, and numerous works with Crosby Stills and Nash such as CSN, Stephen Stills 2. Ron's first RIAA certified gold record was Brook Benton's Rainy Night In Georgia in 1969 and Howard's first RIAA certified gold record was Jackie Moore's "Precious, Precious", in 1970. Howard Albert has said "I think we have 40 gold records to our name and about 30 or so platinum." Their work has sold hundreds of millions of records worldwide and they were inducted into the Florida Music Hall of Fame in 2013 for their lasting impact and influence on the music industry and popular culture.

== History ==
In 1967, with his brother Howard having been drafted to serve in the United States Army to fight in the Vietnam War, 14-year-old Ron Albert pursued a job at the only major recording studio in Miami at that time, Criteria Studios, where he was hired as a typist for the studio's tape library. A short time after Albert was hired, the studio's owner and chief engineer, Mack Emerman, became sick, and Ron Albert filled in as an engineer, eventually becoming the studio's primary engineer upon Emerman's retirement. In 1969, Ron's brother Howard was discharged from the Army and, upon returning to Miami, began working alongside his brother at Criteria Studios as an engineer in 1970.

The Albert Brothers became known as "Fat Albert Productions." Along with Atlantic Records president, Ahmet Ertegun, Atlantic producers Tom Dowd and Arif Mardin, Atlantic co-owner Jerry Wexler, and MCI recording equipment president, Jeep Harned, the brothers helped Criteria become a heavily sought-after international recording studio, particularly during the 1970's. Eventually, the brothers became Criteria Studios business partners and were named as Co-Vice Presidents. In 1983, the brothers had planned on retiring, so they sold their shares in the company.

Then in 1987, the Albert Brothers abandoned their retirement plans and partnered with the former co-owner of TK Records, Steve Alaimo, to form two new companies: Vision Records and Audio Vision Studios. Originally intended to house long-time collaborating artists from the Criteria and TK Records days, Audio Vision Studios became a popular hub for Miami's up and coming Hip Hop, Rap, Latin Pop, and Freestyle scenes with Vision Records serving as the label for these artists.

In 2022, the Albert Brothers and Alaimo sold Audio Vision Studios after captaining the studio to over 20 gold records and 41 platinum records. They subsequently licensed out their library of Vision Record masters. With hip-hop being the current most popular type of music in Miami, new technology such as digital Pro Tools is used for a majority of the music production at Audio Vision Studios today.

Now retired, Howard lives in upstate Florida while Ron resides in South Florida.

== Music ==
Throughout their distinguished career, the Albert Brothers have engineered or produced music by numerous revered and classic artists. Noted Rock & Roll, R & B, and Latin Pop artists whose music they have worked on include Crosby, Stills, and Nash, Eric Clapton, Derek and the Dominos, The Allman Brothers Band, Aretha Franklin, James Brown, Brook Benton, Dr. John, Jimi Hendrix, Jackie Moore, Betty Wright, John Mellencamp, Joe Walsh, The Bee Gees, B.B. King, The Beatles, Firefall, Jimmy Page, Frank Zappa, The Rolling Stones, The Eagles, ABBA, Wilson Pickett, Joe Walsh, Buffalo Springfield, Manassas, Tom Petty and the Heartbreakers, Petula Clark, Harry Belafonte, Bob Marley, and Daddy Yankee.

One of the greatest musical achievements of the Albert Brothers' career was recording Derek and the Dominoes band's RIAA certified gold album Layla and Other Assorted Love Songs featuring the iconic title track, Layla. According to some musical historians, Layla is considered one of the most celebrated Rock & Roll masterpieces of all time. The Albert Brothers also recorded Eric Clapton's RIAA certified gold album, The History of Eric Clapton.

Specifically with Aretha Franklin, the Albert Brothers are credited with working on five studio albums with the "Queen of Soul" including the RIAA certified gold album Young, Gifted and Black, as well as Spirit in the Dark, This Girl's In Love With You, Aretha's Greatest Hits, and Let Me In Your Life. Notable hits the duo worked on with Aretha include RIAA certified gold singles: Rock Steady, Day Dreaming, Don't Play That Song, and Spanish Harlem. The Albert Brothers also recorded Aretha's version of Let It Be at Criteria Studios, which was a hit single subsequently released and popularized by The Beatles.

With The Allman Brothers Band, the Albert Brothers produced the RIAA certified platinum record album Eat a Peach which included notable hit singles: One Way Out and (Sweet) Melissa. Then on the album Idlewild South, the Albert Brothers recorded several hit singles including Midnight Rider and Revival.

With Stephen Stills and Crosby, Stills, and Nash, the Albert Brothers produced the RIAA certified 4x platinum album CSN featuring the hit single Just A Song Before I Go, RIAA certified gold album Manassas featuring the hit single Johnny's Garden, as well as the RIAA certified gold album Stephen Stills 2 featuring the hit single Change Partners.

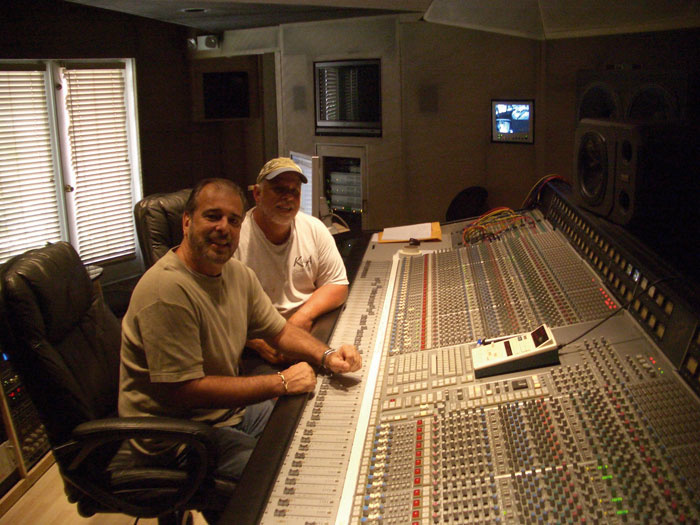
The Albert Brothers in the 2010s at Audio Vision Studios.

While at Audion Vision Studios, the Albert Brothers also worked with many major Hip Hop and Rap artists, including Jay-Z, Lil Wayne, Usher, Jason Derulo, Trina, Ludacris, Jamie Foxx, Will.I.Am, Kanye West, Doja Cat, Future, Trick Daddy, Rick Ross, Flo Rida, Migos, Cardi B, French Montana, Da Baby, DJ Khaled, Megan Thee Stallion, Travis Scott, Trey Songz, Young Thug, Justin Timberlake, Soulja Boy, Big Tymers, Inner Circle, Ace Hood, Ghostface Killah, Missy Elliott, Gucci Mane, Bone Thugs and Harmony, Skrillex, and Lil Jon & The East Side Boyz.

== Drum Sound Development ==
A key achievement the Albert Brothers are known for is their creation of the "Fat Albert" drum sound or the "Miami Sound". They achieved this audio signature by adding a microphone to each part of a drum kit. A separate microphone would be added to each tom, snare, cymbal, bass drum, and so forth. This resulted in a new and unique drum sound as no one before them had tried to multi-mic a drum kit. According to Ron Albert, "as we got a few clients, we started getting recognition for it. The Rolling Stoneses, Eric Claptons, and the Stephen Stillses of the world were coming for our drum sound.... It became the "Miami Sound" because we were in Miami making it". Ron explained further that "As technology improved, we'd work on our skills. We'd come in late – everybody else would go home at six o'clock. We came up with our multi-mic technique for recording drums: we'd go overhead, have one mic on the kick and mics on every cymbal".

The drum sound was a result of the Albert Brothers camaraderie, explains Howard "we were sort of cheating the world because there were two of us." Explaining further, Howard says "we worked pretty much hand in hand, there was no set approach. When we were both at the console there were four hands on the board, and we worked so well together that, if something had to be done, Ron knew what had to be done before I could say 'Hey, do this,' and it was the same the other way around." This teamwork applied to their overall skill in obtaining a unique sound beyond just drums, Howard explains "we had one standing in the control room while the other was moving mics. We could hear the change from location to location. We could get guitar sounds that no one else was getting then because we had two sets of ears." As Ron explains "part of getting a good guitar sound was knowing the instrument. People will still behave like they're on stage, and put a microphone straight on a guitar – but if you move the mic six inches to the left, or right, or down, suddenly the sound is so much different."

Reflecting on their careers, Howard summarizes "we were in the right place at the right time. We had some talent and knew what we were doing, and that came out in the records. But we had an extremely high caliber of people that we worked with, and that certainly helped make something that lasts."
