= Change Partners (Stephen Stills song) =

Single by Stephen Stills

from the album Stephen Stills 2
- B-side: "Relaxing Town"
- Released: 1971
- Genre: Folk Rock
- Length: 3:13
- Label: Atlantic
- Songwriter: Stephen Stills
- Producers: Stephen Stills; Bill Halverson

Stephen Stills singles chronology
"Sit Yourself Down" (1971)	"Change Partners" (1971)	"Marianne" (1971)

"Change Partners" is a song written by Stephen Stills that was released on his 1971 album Stephen Stills 2. It was also released as the debut single from the album, just missing the Top 40, and peaking at number 43 on the Billboard Charts, during the week of July 24, 1971 and spending 9 weeks on the chart.

== Music and Lyrics ==
Stills said "it was about growing up in the south, attending the debutante balls, but Graham likes to refer to it as the Crosby, Stills & Nash theme song, which I suppose it is". Jerry Garcia performs the pedal steel guitar played throughout the song. The song was recorded at Wally Heider Recording, Studio III in June 1970, with overdubs recorded at Criteria Recording Studios.

== Reception ==
Paste Magazine called it a "catchy pop hit". Cash Box described the song as being "a production showcase, rather than a top forty-rhythm outing" and more of "an FM preview teaser than a teen sales effort."

== Chart history ==
Chart (1971)	Peak position
Canada 100 (RPM)	42
Netherlands (Single Top 100)	9
Netherlands (Dutch Top 40)	24
US Hot 100 (Billboard)	43
US Singles (Cash Box)	38
US Singles (Record World)	40
