= Stephen Stills (album) =

Studio album by Stephen Stills
- Released: November 16, 1970
- Recorded: January, June–July 1970
- Studios: Island, London; The Record Plant and Wally Heider, Los Angeles
- Genres: Folk rock, hard rock
- Length: 38:56
- Label: Atlantic
- Producers: Stephen Stills, Bill Halverson

Stephen Stills chronology
Super Session (1968)	Stephen Stills (1970)	Stephen Stills 2 (1971)

Singles from Stephen Stills
- 1. "Love the One You're With" / "To a Flame" Released: November 1970; 2. "Sit Yourself Down"/"We Are Not Helpless" Released: January 1971

Stephen Stills is the debut solo album by American musician Stephen Stills released on Atlantic Records in 1970. It is one of four high-profile albums (all charting within the top fifteen) released by each member of Crosby, Stills, Nash & Young in the wake of their 1970 chart-topping album Déjà Vu, along with After the Gold Rush (Neil Young, September 1970), If I Could Only Remember My Name (David Crosby, February 1971) and Songs for Beginners (Graham Nash, May 1971). It was primarily recorded between CSNY tours in London and Los Angeles. It was released in the United States on November 16, 1970, and in the United Kingdom on November 27, 1970.

The album features many themes common to 1960s' countercultural beliefs, with many songs directly inspired by Stills' on-going and previous relationships with girlfriends and members of CSNY. The album was an immediate commercial success, in both the UK and the US, going top ten and being certified Gold by the Recording Industry Association of America.

== Background ==
The album was mainly recorded at Island Studios in London between the two CSNY tours of 1969 and 1970. Stills had bought a mansion in Surrey, England, for £100,000 called Brookfields, which previously belonged to Ringo Starr, and Peter Sellers. This, on the advice of Ahmet Ertegun, head of Atlantic Records, allowed him to get away from Los Angeles and the deteriorating relationships within CSNY. The songs recorded at Island Studios, include "Old Times, Good Times", "To a Flame" and "Go Back Home". After the 1970 CSNY Tour, Stills recorded a few more songs in LA, and most of the backing vocals. Graham Nash recalled in his book Wild Tales: "Stephen called and said, 'You remember that song of mine, "Love the One You’re With," that I cut in London? Well, I've brought the track back and we're in Wally Heider's with it. I need voices for the choruses. Any chance you and David would come down?'" In addition to Crosby & Nash, the album features an array of well-known guest musicians, including John Sebastian, Cass Elliot and Rita Coolidge who contributed vocals. Ringo Starr drums on two tracks under the pseudonym "Richie", which he also used for his contribution to the London Sessions album by American bluesman Howlin' Wolf, recorded in England the same year. Stills' album is also the only album to which both Eric Clapton and Jimi Hendrix supplied guitar work. According to Stills, he "bumped into Eric one evening, and he came by and the night degenerated into an endless jam of The Champs' "Tequila". Then we did the album track ("Go Back Home") in the studio. His solo was one take and he got a fabulous sound". Also, around this time Clapton recorded the solo for "Fishes and Scorpions" which appeared on Stills' follow-up, Stephen Stills 2. Hendrix added guitar to "Old Times, Good Times" at Island Studios on 15 March 1970. Stills recalled in 1991:

Hendrix and I cut a bunch of stuff together, this is one of the few things that surfaced. He was a very dear friend of mine, we were lonely in London together and hung out a lot. I left England suddenly, and years later I learned from Mitch Mitchell that Jimi had been looking for me everywhere – wanted me to join the Experience as the bass player, which would have been my greatest dream in life! It had something to do with a manager deciding it was a wrong career move and said, 'we don't know where he is.' I learned to play lead guitar from Jimi he showed me the scales and said things like, 'You begin by thinking about the chord position and base your improvisations on that.' Or he'd make some little remark like, 'F sharp is really cool,' and we'd develop a jam around that. We'd make up songs, play the blues. He'd improvise until the inspiration began to ebb, then he'd look at me and say, 'You drive.' You had to hear that cat play acoustic guitar! We once jammed for about five days, one long marathon session in my beach house in Malibu. The sheriff's deputy overheard our guitar playing. When he found out it was us he asked permission to park his police car directly outside the house so he could listen in while he fielded radio calls. Told us not to worry about a thing, he'd be looking out for us.

== Writing and recording ==
The song "We Are Not Helpless" was wrongly assumed by many critics to be a response to Neil Young's song "Helpless" from the Déjà Vu album. "Love the One You're With," Stills' biggest solo hit single, peaked at No. 14 on the Billboard Hot 100 on December 19, 1970, and another single pulled from the album, "Sit Yourself Down," went to No. 37 on March 27, 1971. "Sit Yourself Down" and "Cherokee" are thought to be written about Rita Coolidge, with whom Stills was romantically involved during 1970. "Do For the Others" was written for David Crosby about the death of his girlfriend Christine Hinton.

== Title and packaging ==
The front cover photo was taken by photographer Henry Diltz during a snowy September morning outside Stills' cabin in Colorado. The pink giraffe on the cover is thought to be a secret message to one of his girlfriends, specifically Rita Coolidge who had just left him for Graham Nash, which was one of the contributing factors for the demise of CSNY. In the liner notes on the back cover Stills included a poem called “A Child Grew Up On Strings.” by Charles John Quarto Stills dedicated the album to Jimi Hendrix, who had died two months before the album arrived in stores, as to "James Marshall Hendrix".

== Release ==
The album peaked at No. 3 on the Billboard Top Pop Albums chart in the week of January 2, 1971, during a 39-week run. It was reissued by WEA after being digitally remastered using the HDCD process on December 5, 1995. "We Are Not Helpless" and "Love the One You're With" were first performed in concert on May 12, 1970, during Crosby, Stills, Nash & Young's Déjà Vu tour. In 2009 Crosby, Stills, & Nash released Demos featuring an early demo of "Love the One You're With". It was certified Gold in the USA (RIAA) just eight days after release on November 24, 1970. By 1974, according to Rolling Stone magazine, the album had sold an estimated 800,000 copies in the US alone. Originally this was the highest selling album out of the four high-profile albums released by each member of Crosby, Stills, Nash & Young in the wake of their 1970 chart-topping album Déjà Vu, until it was overtaken by Neil Young's After the Gold Rush. Stills commented it would have been No 1 (most likely on the Record World Charts where it peaked at No 2) if it hadn't been for George Harrison releasing All Things Must Pass at the same time.

== Reception ==
Professional ratings
Review scores
Source	Rating
AllMusic	4.5/5 stars
Christgau's Record Guide	C+
The Encyclopedia of Popular Music	5/5 stars

Reviews of the album were decidedly mixed, ranging from lukewarm to positive. Ed Ward in a contemporary review in Rolling Stone felt that the album had an "elusive" quality, and though he didn't dislike the album, and admired parts, he felt it lacked "meat". However, he felt that "Love the One You're With" would make a "killer single". In another contemporary review, Robert Christgau awarded the album a C+, saying he "effortlessly swings," picking out "Go Back Home" for praise, and is too "damn skillful to put down". Yet he felt there was something "undefined about the record."

However, three contemporary reviews Record World, Cashbox, and Billboard were full of praise for the album. Record World called Stills "one of the steadiest performers on the rock circuit" and said the "result of the album was stupendous". Cashbox said Stills' "keyboard, guitars and vocals were brilliant" and the songs were "among the best he's ever written". Billboard said Stills was "a complex talent bursting with soul and depth" and "via brilliant arrangements takes rock to new and musical heights." Richard Williams for Melody Maker 1970, said "'Love the One You're With' and 'Sit Yourself Down' are both comfortable and smooth-harmonised songs, which could have come from Déjà vu. 'Church (Part Of Someone)' is a stretched gospel song, maybe the best he's ever written with thick choral responses (I'd dig to hear Lorraine Ellisson singing it)'.

Mick Jagger was quoted in the NME, saying that he's 'been listening to... and really likes Stills' new album... finding it really funky'.

In a retrospective summary AllMusic called it "a jaw-dropping experience" just short of Crosby, Stills & Nash and Déjà Vu.

Rankings

In 1974, it was ranked number 70 by the NME writers in their best albums of all time. The album was included in the book 1001 Albums You Must Hear Before You Die. It was voted number 129 in Colin Larkin's All Time Top 1000 Albums in 2000.

== Track listing ==
All tracks are written by Stephen Stills.

Side one
No.	Title	Length
1.	"Love the One You're With"	3:04
2.	"Do for the Others"	2:52
3.	"Church (Part of Someone)"	4:05
4.	"Old Times Good Times"	3:39
5.	"Go Back Home"	5:54

Side two
No.	Title	Length
1.	"Sit Yourself Down"	3:05
2.	"To a Flame"	3:08
3.	"Black Queen"	5:26
4.	"Cherokee"	3:23
5.	"We Are Not Helpless"	4:20
Total length:		38:56

== Personnel ==
- Stephen Stills – vocals, guitars, bass, piano, organ, steelpan, percussion; horn and string arrangements (3, 4, 7, 9)
- Jimi Hendrix – electric guitar (4)
- Eric Clapton – electric guitar (5)
- Booker T. Jones – organ (9); backing vocal (10)
- Calvin "Fuzzy" Samuel – bass (1, 3–6)
- Conrad Isidore – drums (3, 4)
- John Barbata – drums (5, 6)
- Ringo Starr – drums (7, 10)
- Dallas Taylor – drums (9)
- Jeff Whittaker – congas (1, 4)
- Sidney George – flute, alto saxophone (9)
- Rita Coolidge, David Crosby, Priscilla Jones, John Sebastian – backing vocals (1, 5, 6, 10)
- Cass Elliot, Claudia Lennear – backing vocals (5, 6, 10)
- Graham Nash – backing vocals (1, 6, 10)
- Judith Powell, Larry Steele, Liza Strike, Tony Wilson – backing vocals (3)
- Sherlie Matthews – backing vocals (10)
- Arif Mardin – string arrangements (3, 7)

Additional personnel

- Bill Halverson – producer
- Andy Johns – engineer
- Gary Burden – art direction, back cover photography
- Henry Diltz – front cover photography
- Charles John Quarto – sleeve poem
- Joe Gastwirt – digital remastering

== Charts ==
Albums

Chart performance for Stephen Stills
Chart (1970–1971)	Peak position
US Billboard Top LPs	3
UK Album Charts	8
Canadian RPM 100 Albums	7
Australian Go-Set Top 20 Albums	8
Swedish Kvällstoppen Chart	3
Norwegian VG-lista Albums	12
Dutch MegaCharts Albums	5
US Cash Box Top 100 Albums	5
US Record World Album Chart	2

Year-end charts

Chart (1971)	Position
US Billboard Year-End	26
US Cashbox Year-End	52
Dutch MegaCharts Albums	44

Singles

Chart performance for singles from Stephen Stills
Year	Single	Chart	Position
1970	"Love the One You're With"	US Billboard Hot 100	14
1970	"Love the One You're With"	Netherlands (Single Top 100)	9
1970	"Love the One You're With"	Canada Top Singles (RPM)	6
1970	"Love the One You're With"	UK Singles (Official Charts Company)	37
1970	"Love the One You're With"	US Easy Listening (Billboard)	32
1970	"Love the One You're With"	Australia (Go-Set National Top 40)	29
1970	"Love the One You're With"	US Top Singles (Cash Box)	16
1970	"Love the One You're With"	US Top Singles (Record World)	10
1971	"Sit Yourself Down"	US Billboard Hot 100	37
1971	"Sit Yourself Down"	Canada Top Singles (RPM)	24
1971	"Sit Yourself Down"	US Top Singles (Cash Box)	31
1971	"Sit Yourself Down"	US Top Singles (Record World)	35

== Certification ==
Region	Certification	Certified units/sales
United States (RIAA)	Gold	500,000^{^}
^{^} Shipments figures based on certification alone.
