= Manassas (band) =

American rock band (1971–1973)

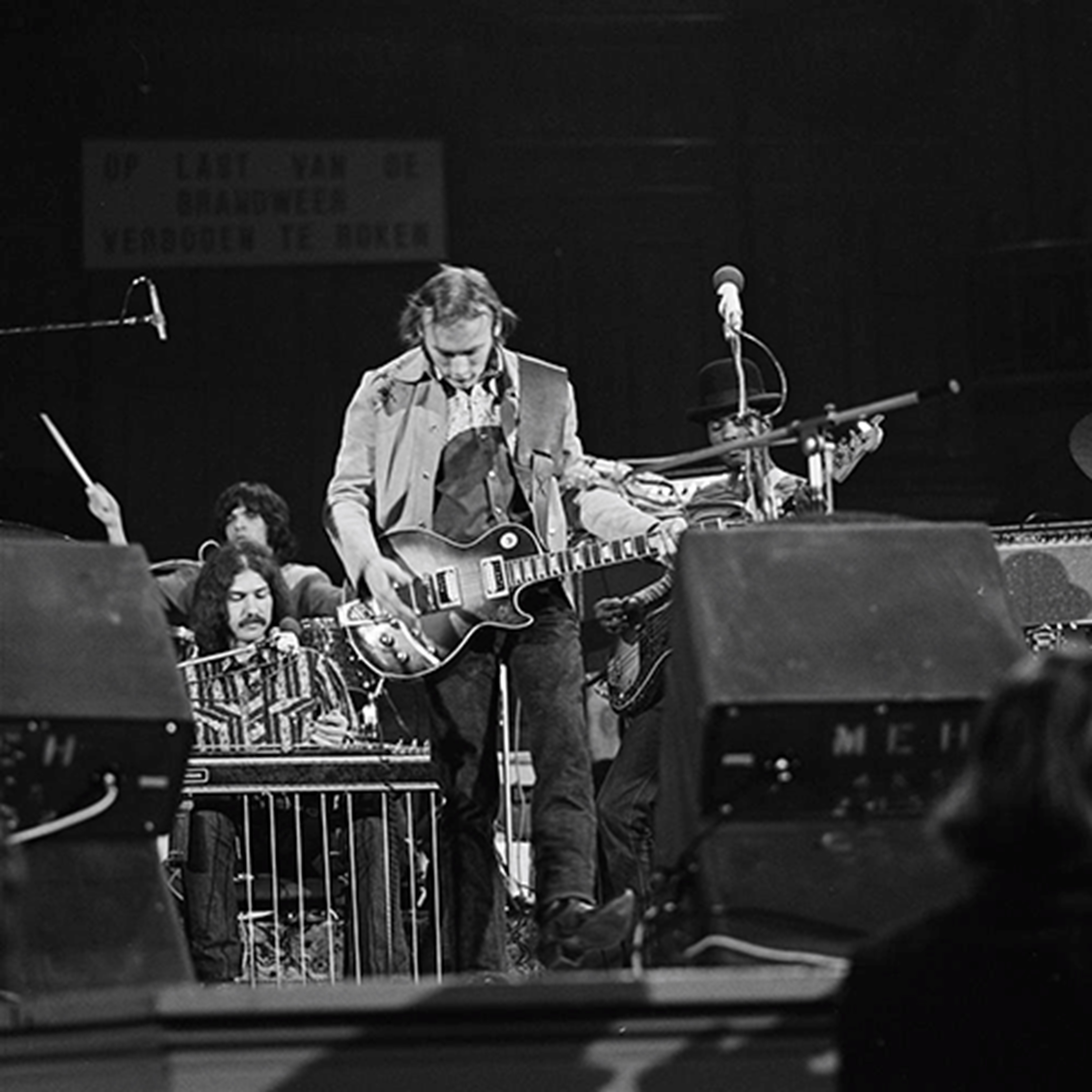
- Manassas (TopPop, 1972)

Background information
- Origin: Miami, Florida, U.S.
- Genres: Blues rock, country rock, Southern rock, bluegrass, folk
- Years active: 1971–1973
- Labels: Atlantic, Rhino
- Spinoffs: Souther–Hillman–Furay Band
- Spinoff of: Crosby, Stills, Nash & Young; Flying Burrito Brothers
- Past members: Stephen Stills; Chris Hillman; Al Perkins; Calvin "Fuzzy" Samuel; Paul Harris; Dallas Taylor; Joe Lala

Manassas was an American rock supergroup formed by Stephen Stills in 1971. Used primarily for Stills' music, the band released two studio albums before disbanding in October 1973. They released a 1972 self titled debut and a second album titled Down the Road in 1973.

== Formation and first album ==
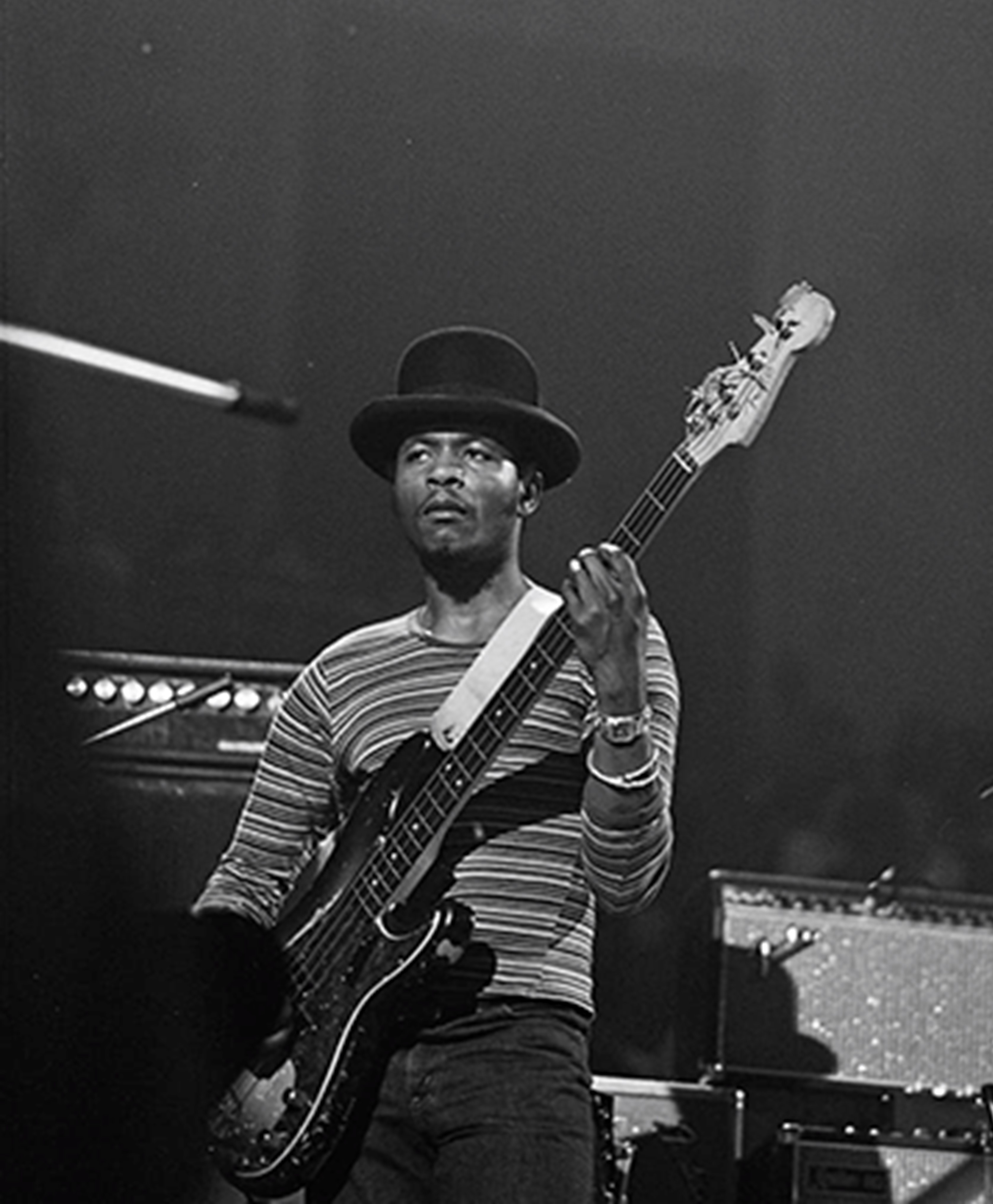
Calvin "Fuzzy" Samuel with Manassas (1972)

Manassas was formed in the fall of 1971, following Stills' concert tour to support his album Stephen Stills 2 (1971). While Stephen Stills 2 was Stills' second solo album, it was his first completed following the acrimonious 1970 breakup of Crosby, Stills, Nash & Young (CSNY), and was not critically well received. After a chance meeting with Flying Burrito Brothers singer/multi-instrumentalist Chris Hillman in Cleveland, where Stills' tour schedule crossed paths with that of the Burritos – a band that, by late 1971, had undergone multiple personnel changes and was in financial trouble – Stills saw an opportunity to change his artistic direction. He subsequently contacted Hillman, asking him, along with Burritos' steel guitarist Al Perkins and fiddler Byron Berline, to join him in Miami at Criteria Studios to jam. Stills also invited several members of his touring band (drummer Dallas Taylor, bassist Calvin "Fuzzy" Samuel, keyboardist Paul Harris and vocalist/percussionist Joe Lala) to play at the session.

The musicians quickly gelled in the studio, and within several weeks had recorded enough material at Criteria to fill a double-LP album release. The band was capable of a wide musical range, with a repertoire including blues, folk, country, Latin, and rock songs. The Rolling Stones' bassist Bill Wyman, a friend of both Hillman and Stills who visited Criteria during the sessions, was an early fan of the band, at one point expressing an interest in joining. Wyman contributed to the sessions by helping Stills re-write an unrecorded song from 1968, "Bumblebee," as the blues/funk tune "The Love Gangster," with Wyman also playing bass on the track. The band named itself Manassas after Stills, who had an interest in American Civil War history, orchestrated a photo shoot for them in Manassas, Virginia, the site of the First and Second Battles of Bull Run (1861 and 1862, respectively).

The band's first album, Manassas, a double-LP sporting a cover photo from the shoot in Virginia, was released in April 1972. The album was well received, quickly peaking at No. 4 in the United States and achieving RIAA gold certification. For most of 1972, Manassas embarked on an international tour in support of the album, playing in Europe, Australia, and arenas in the United States. They would open their concerts with the first side of the album in full, and finish with "The Treasure", then an acoustic "Find the Cost of Freedom". During this tour they appeared on the TV shows: ABC-TV's In Concert in the United States, BBC's In Concert in the United Kingdom, and Beat-Club in West Germany.

== Second album, hiatus, reformation and breakup ==
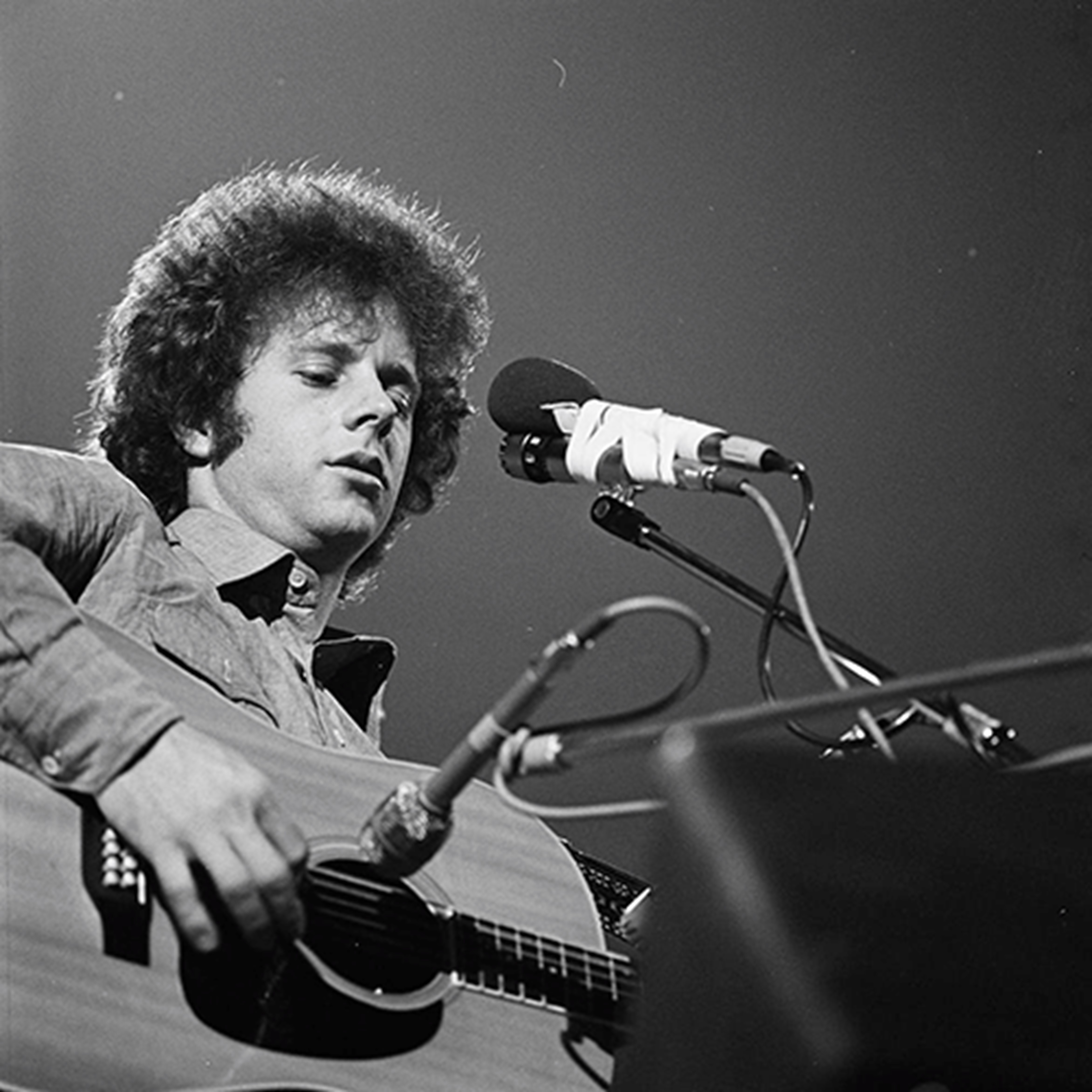
Chris Hillman (with Manassas, TopPop, 1972)

Upon returning to the U.S. from the European leg of Manassas' 1972 tour, Chris Hillman took several weeks away from the band to record a reunion album with his pre-Burritos band the Byrds, an effort that also included Stills' ex-CSNY bandmate David Crosby. Manassas then regrouped and quickly completed their second album, Down the Road. Initial sessions for the album were convened at Criteria Studios, but the band moved the sessions in midstream to Caribou Ranch in Colorado and the Record Plant in Los Angeles after Criteria staff engineers Ron and Howard Albert expressed concern that the sessions were not producing quality results. Down the Road was completed in January 1973. The album was released in the spring of that year to middling reviews and sales, ultimately peaking at No. 26 in the United States and falling short of RIAA gold status; it was the first album that Stills appeared on since 1968 that did not attain the latter certification.

After completing Down the Road, Manassas became dormant for several months. During the break, Stephen Stills married Véronique Sanson, whom he had met in Paris during Manassas' 1972 European tour. As Hillman and Crosby's Byrds reunion album was readied for release in March 1973, the band considered launching a Byrds tour in support. When this did not materialize, two events occurred instead that effectively doomed Manassas. First, Hillman accepted his management's proposal to join a project involving ex-Buffalo Springfield and Poco singer/guitarist Richie Furay and Eagles songwriter/collaborator JD Souther, after satisfying Manassas' scheduled touring commitments. Shortly thereafter, Crosby and ex-CSNY mate Graham Nash joined Neil Young and The Stray Gators on tour in support of Young's Harvest (1972). When this tour ended in mid-1973, Crosby, Nash and Young – encouraged by their management, and hopeful to realize the financial benefits of a possible CSNY reunion – regrouped in Maui to discuss potential work on a new album. The three contacted Stills, who, putting aside the differences that led to CSNY's initial demise, cut short his honeymoon break with Sanson to join the new project. CSNY worked for several weeks in both Maui and Los Angeles on the project, Human Highway, but these sessions were ultimately aborted due to various disagreements within the band.

Stills was greeted by several sources of turmoil upon returning from the Human Highway sessions to regroup Manassas, as, in addition to Hillman's future commitment to work with Furay and Souther, Dallas Taylor had become severely addicted to heroin, and Calvin Samuels had left the band for personal reasons. Stills dealt with these issues by securing the services of Jefferson Airplane drummer John Barbata (who had previously replaced Taylor in CSNY during their 1970 tour and Kenny Buttrey during Young's 1973 tour) as a backup for Taylor, and bassist Kenny Passarelli of Joe Walsh's band Barnstorm to replace Samuels. Samuels would return to the band for the last leg of its 1973 tour. Following the tour's completion in October, Manassas's dissolution was publicly announced.

One of Manassas' last shows, at San Francisco's Winterland Ballroom in early October 1973, was made notable by the band's being joined onstage by first David Crosby and Graham Nash, and, later in the show, by Neil Young. When later asked about this occurrence, Chris Hillman would comment "I could smell a CSNY reunion." CSNY would, in fact, regroup for a world tour in early 1974. Following this tour, Stephen Stills would start a new band in 1974 with Kenny Passarelli and Joe Lala, but this was short-lived; Passarelli would soon depart to join the Elton John Band, and Lala would subsequently leave as well. Chris Hillman's Souther-Hillman-Furay Band, which would also include Manassas members Al Perkins and Paul Harris (and eventually Joe Lala, who also played on the 1974 CSNY reunion tour), released its first album in early 1974.

== Legacy ==
Criteria Studios engineer Howard Albert has said "Manassas was one of the greatest and the most underrated bands of the seventies. That double album, along with Eric Clapton's Layla – which me and [Ron Albert] both worked on – stand as the most important and best albums we've ever been a part of." Of the band's prowess on stage, Stephen Stills has said "Manassas was such a terrific band. It really had some structure and reminded me of [Stills' previous band] the Buffalo Springfield at its best. Manassas could play anything."

== Personnel ==
=== Original band members ===
- Stephen Stills, vocals, guitars, keyboards, bass
- Chris Hillman, vocals, guitars, mandolin, bass
- Al Perkins, steel guitar, guitar
- Calvin "Fuzzy" Samuels, bass, backing vocals
- Paul Harris, keyboards
- Dallas Taylor, drums
- Joe Lala, percussion, backing vocals

=== Touring members (1973 only) ===
- Kenny Passarelli, bass
- John Barbata, drums (for one gig only)

=== Session contributors ===
Per:

- Bill Wyman, bass (on Manassas)
- Byron Berline, fiddle (on Manassas)
- Joe Walsh, slide guitar (on Down the Road)
- Bobby Whitlock, keyboards & backing vocals (on Down the Road)
- P. P. Arnold, backing vocals (on Down the Road)
- Sydney George, harmonica (on Manassas) and flute (on Down the Road)
- Jerry Aiello, keyboards (on Manassas and Down the Road)
- Charlie Grimes, guitar (on Down the Road)

== Tours ==
- Manassas World Tour 1972
- Manassas North American Tour 1973

== Discography ==
=== Studio albums ===
Title	Album details	Peak chart positions												Sales (as of 1974)	Certifications
Title	Album details	US	Cash Box	_{Record World}	GER	NED	AUS	IT	SPA	SW	NOR	UK	CAN	Sales (as of 1974)	Certifications
Manassas	Released: April 12, 1972; Label: Atlantic Records	4	6	4	32	1	17	23	—	8	6	30	9	US: 800,000; FR: 100,000	RIAA: Gold
Down the Road	Released: April 23, 1973; Label: Atlantic Records	26	25	18	—	—	—	—	19	18	—	33	31	US: 300,000	

=== Compilation album ===
Title	Album details	Peak chart positions								Notes
Title	Album details	US	GER	NED	AUS	IT	NOR	UK	CAN	Notes
Pieces	Released: September 9, 2009; Label: Rhino Records	—	—	—	—	—	—	—	—	Previously unreleased material from both Manassas albums

=== Singles ===
Year	Title	Peak chart positions								Album	Label
Year	Title	US	_{Cash} _{Box}	_{Record} _{World}	US AC	AUS	UK	NED	CAN	Album	Label
1972	"It Doesn't Matter" b/w "Rock & Roll Crazies Medley" or "Fallen Eagles"	61	49	46	—	—	—	—	48	Manassas	Atlantic
1972	"Rock & Roll Crazies Medley" b/w "Colorado"	92	111	86	—	—	—	—	—	Manassas	Atlantic
1973	"Isn't It About Time" b/w "So Many Times"	56	62	62	—	—	—	—	77	Down The Road	Atlantic
1973	"Down The Road" b/w "Guaguancó De Veró"	—	—	129	—	—	—	—	—	Down The Road	Atlantic
