= Paul Harris (musician) =

American musician (1944–2023)

- Born: Paul Harris; December 12, 1944; Forest Hills, Queens, New York, U.S.
- Died: October 24, 2023 (aged 78) Ft. Lauderdale, Florida
- Genres: Rock; pop; folk; blues; Country rock
- Occupations: Musician; songwriter
- Instruments: Keyboards; flute; harmonica; guitar
- Years active: 1966–2010
- Formerly of: King Harvest; Manassas; Souther-Hillman-Furay Band; Utopia

Paul Harris (December 12, 1944 – October 24, 2023) was an American keyboard player, multi-instrumentalist and arranger.

Harris appears on several albums of the 1960s, 1970s and 1980s by leading artists such as Stephen Stills, B. B. King, Judy Collins, Grace Slick, Al Kooper, ABBA, Eric Andersen, Rick Derringer, Nick Drake, John Martyn, John Sebastian, John Mellencamp, Joe Walsh, Seals & Crofts, Bob Seger and Dan Fogelberg. He provided the orchestral arrangements for The Doors' 1969 album The Soft Parade. In the 1970s, he was a member of Stephen Stills' band Manassas and later the Souther–Hillman–Furay Band.

Paul Harris died on October 24, 2023, at the age of 78.
