= Calvin "Fuzzy" Samuel =

Antiguan-born musician

Calvin Samuel
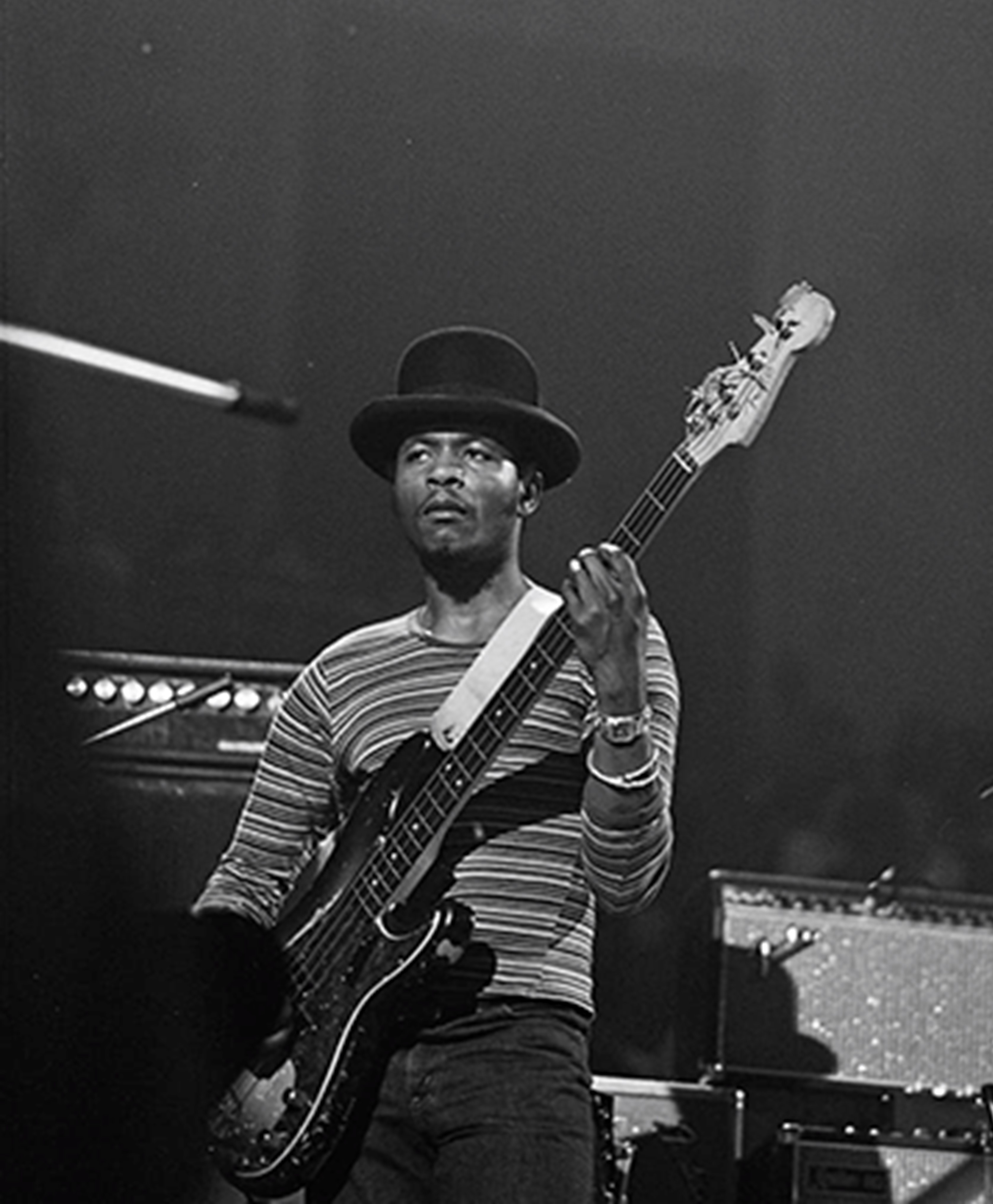
- Samuel playing with Manassas, 1972

Background information
- Born: Calvin Samuel; September 24, 1947 (age 78); St John's, Antigua
- Genres: Folk rock; rock; blues; R&B; soul
- Occupation: Bassist
- Years active: 1964 - present
- Website: calvinfuzzsamuel.com

Calvin Samuel, known as Calvin "Fuzzy" Samuel, is an Antiguan-born musician best known for his bass playing in the 1970s with Stephen Stills, Manassas, Crosby, Stills, Nash and Young, and others. He has often been credited as "Samuels", with an "s" added to his surname.

== Biography ==
Born in Antigua, in the West Indies, in 1947, Samuel relocated to London, U.K. as a child. Self-taught on bass, through the 1960s he toured and recorded with a series of groups which included other West Indian musicians. In 1965 he played in Blue-Ace-Unit with Junior Marvin. In 1966 he joined Joe E. Young & The Toniks (with drummer Conrad Isidore and vocalist Colin Young), but left before their 1968 album Soul Buster! produced by Tommy Scott (producer of Them).

In 1968, Samuel, Isidore and guitarist/singer Wendell Richardson formed the psychedelic rock/soul trio The Sundae Times, and recorded an album of original songs, Us Coloured Kids, produced by their friend Eddy Grant of The Equals. One single "Aba-Aba” was a hit in Israel. Some sources claim that Samuel plays, uncredited, on recordings by The Equals.

Subsequently Marvin joined reggae group The Wailers, Young joined pop group The Foundations, and Richardson became a founding member of the Afro-rock group Osibisa.

In late 1969 or early 1970, Samuel met American singer-songwriter Stephen Stills in London. At Island Studios in January 1970 they began recording for Stills' first solo album, which includes the hit single "Love the One You're With", and contributions by Jimi Hendrix and Samuel's friend Isidore.

Relocating to the US, Samuel became the bassist for Crosby, Stills, Nash and Young and immediately took part in the studio recording of their protest song "Ohio", recorded in May 1970. After touring with CSNY, he became a founding member of Stills' super-group, Manassas, a band which brought together rock, folk, blues, country and Latin rhythms. He appears on CSNY's live album 4 Way Street (1971) and other solo recordings by Stills, Nash, and Crosby.

From the 1970s, through to the 1990s, Samuel worked with musicians in the UK and US including Rita Coolidge, Dr. John, Marianne Faithfull, America, Alvin Lee, Steve Winwood, Mick Taylor, Kevin Ayers, and Taj Mahal. His long friendship with Taj resulted in his bass playing on the Grammy-nominated album Mule Bone (1991).

In the early 1990s, Samuel was a member of Bobby Keys' band, Tumbling Dice, along with other Rolling Stones associates Mick Taylor, Nicky Hopkins, and Ivan Neville.

Samuel has recorded under his own name from the 1990s onwards, singing and playing bass, bouzouki, and guitar. He has released albums including This Train Still Runs, Love Don't Taste Like Chicken (1999), Organic Blues (2000) and Island Breeze (2012).

== Personal life ==
In the early 1970s, Samuel was in a relationship with vocalist P.P. Arnold. Their son Kodzo Samuel is a musical director for Jessie J and Jess Glynne. He is credited as a songwriter on Arnold's 2019 album, The New Adventures of...P.P. Arnold.

Samuel also has three children Zion, Ella, and Bussa with his wife, Andrani.
