= CSNY 1974 =

Live album by Crosby, Stills, Nash & Young
- Released: July 8, 2014
- Recorded: August 14–15, 19–21, 27–29, 1974 September 14, 1974 December 14, 1974
- Venue: Various
- Genres: Rock; folk rock
- Length: 196:15 (full version); 78:16 (single disc sampler)
- Label: Rhino
- Producers: Graham Nash; Joel Bernstein

Crosby, Stills, Nash & Young chronology
CSN 2012 (2012)	CSNY 1974 (2014)	Live at Fillmore East, 1969 (2024)

Professional ratings
Aggregate scores
Source	Rating
Metacritic	87/100
Review scores
Source	Rating
AllMusic	4/5 stars
Blurt	5/5 stars
Drowned in Sound	8/10
Rolling Stone	4.5/5 stars

CSNY 1974 is a live album by Crosby, Stills, Nash & Young, and their seventh in the CSNY quartet configuration. Issued on Rhino Records in 2014, it consists of concert material recorded in 1974 on the band's tour during the summer of that year. It was issued in several formats: a standard compact disc box set consisting of three audio discs and a standard DVD; as one pure audio Blu-ray disc and a Blu-ray/DVD; and a more expensively packaged limited deluxe edition consisting of the material on six vinyl records along with the Blu-ray discs and a coffee table book. Three single disc samplers were also issued: one of the acoustic material exclusively available at Starbucks in the United States and Canada; a second at normal retail outlets; and a third included as a covermount disc to the 250th anniversary issue of the UK music magazine Mojo issued as "an exclusive audio-visual sampler of the new CSNY 1974 box set." Each of the non-sampler sets also contained a 188-page booklet, and all formats were released the same day, with the Mojo sampler arriving with the September 2014 publication of that edition. The three-disc and DVD package peaked at No. 17 on the Billboard 200, while the Starbucks sampler peaked at No. 37 and the selections sampler at No. 81.

== Background ==
After the split of CSNY in the summer of 1970, through 1971 David Crosby, Graham Nash, and Neil Young released solo albums, while Stephen Stills issued two. All were gold records, as were the three issued in early 1972 by the four members: Harvest; Graham Nash David Crosby; and Manassas; proving the group to be appealing commercially apart as well as together. Indicative of this commercial clout, only the separated Beatles as a group also achieved gold records with regularity during the same time period, reinforcing the notion of CSNY as the American Beatles. The foursome showed little interest in regrouping given their individual success, but with the Beatles defunct and Bob Dylan not touring, public enthusiasm remained unabated for CSNY as the new counterculture leaders to record and/or do concerts together, acknowledged by manager Elliot Roberts with his 'pissing in the wind' quote.

Young toured solo in late 1970 and early 1971, Stills undertook his first solo headlining tour with a new band in the summer of 1971, and in the fall of 1971–as documented on the acoustic live album Another Stoney Evening–Crosby & Nash toured for the first time as a duo. In 1972, Stills assembled his band Manassas to tour in support of their album. There had been sporadic reunions, with Young showing up to Crosby and Nash shows, Young recording a one-off single "War Song" with Nash, and CSN in three different pairs providing backing vocals on Young's Harvest album.

In 1973, their individual fortunes began to falter. Stills toured again with Manassas, but their second album did not do as well in the marketplace. Young undertook two tours colored by the death of Crazy Horse guitarist Danny Whitten; the album from the first tour (with Crosby and Nash on a couple of tracks) Time Fades Away falling well short of the previous year's Harvest sales-wise; his dark album Tonight's the Night had been delayed. Crosby's reunion with the Byrds and Nash's second solo album also did not do particularly well commercially. An attempt to make the second CSNY studio album in the summer of 1973 after a reunion in Hawaii fell apart.

Crosby and Nash put together their first electric band tour in late 1973, and Stills continued to tour with Manassas late into 1973, but the seed had been planted. In January and February 1974, impresario Bill Graham successfully directed the return of Bob Dylan to the concert stage with a winter tour of basketball and hockey arenas. Manager Roberts proposed to CSNY something more ambitious: a summer tour of baseball and football stadiums. Crosby, Stills, Nash, and Young agreed, Graham signed on as tour director, and the tour was set to begin in July. Rehearsals took place at Young's ranch in La Honda in May and June.

== Tour ==
Besides the four principals on guitars and keyboards, supporting musicians had previously worked with different members. Tim Drummond had been the bassist for Young's Stray Gators band and had recently played on Wild Tales by Nash and On the Beach by Young. Drummer Russ Kunkel appeared on the debut album by Crosby & Nash and played with Stills in March of 1974, recordings later released on Stephen Stills Live, and percussionist Joe Lala was a member of Stills's band Manassas.

The tour commenced on July 9 at the Seattle Center Coliseum. Attendees were treated to a concert of exceptional length: the band was still playing past 2:00am. Following performances included 30 dates in 23 locations, ending the North American tour proper at the Roosevelt Raceway in Westbury, New York on September 8. A 32nd and final show took place on September 14 at Wembley Stadium, with opening acts including The Band and Joni Mitchell. The Beach Boys, Santana, Joe Walsh, and Jesse Colin Young also appeared as support acts during the tour.

Cass Elliot died in London during the tour on July 29. Nash relayed the news to Kunkel, who was married to her sister Leah. Kunkel said, "She had a big role in their lives. She introduced Graham to Stephen. It was a very difficult day for us when she died. Thank God we were in the middle of doing something we couldn’t stop. The show that night is probably what got us all through it."

Although large multiple-bill festivals such as Miami Pop, Woodstock, and Watkins Glen had taken place, and CSNY, the Rolling Stones, and others had played infrequent stadium shows, no band except for the Beatles had ever attempted a tour of this magnitude. Whereas the Beatles had done a series of stadium dates over two weeks in 1966, the scope of this tour and its logistics were unprecedented; the tour visited indoor sports arenas, race tracks, and smaller college stadia, including Chicago Stadium, Nassau Coliseum, Boston Garden, the Capital Centre, Jeppesen Stadium at the University of Houston, and the St. Paul Civic Center.

== Production and box set content ==
Nash and Joel Bernstein, who had assembled the three individual box sets Voyage, Reflections, and Carry On for Crosby, Nash, and Stills respectively, collaborated again to produce this set. Nash stated that he became the group's archivist both because of his interest in preserving their history and because "I just think I'm the only one with the patience for it." Nash had also produced the 1991 box set for CSN, and Bernstein was the photographer for the 1974 tour. Nash and Bernstein selected the best take for each song from the dozen or so performances available. Nash claimed there were absolutely no overdubs: "If something was out of tune, I would either tune or I'd find it from another show – I'd find something at roughly the same tempo and I'd put it on." The commitment to not overdubbing any tracks led to his decision to not include one of Stills' best known songs, "Carry On", as a good take could not be assembled even by splicing songs together.

Recording locations during the tour as per the dates below were the Nassau Coliseum in Uniondale, New York; the Capital Centre in Landover, Maryland; Chicago Stadium in Chicago; and Wembley Stadium in London, England. Additional recording after the tour took place at a benefit for the United Farm Workers on December 14 at the San Francisco Civic Auditorium. The concerts in Landover and London were filmed and provide the video footage for the DVD.

While the set list consisted of material taken from both group and solo projects, many songs performed on the tour and included in the box set had not been issued before the tour. Some of these tracks may have been intended for the aborted Human Highway CSNY project of the previous summer. (Note: There have been many attempts at reconstructing that album but, as no one from the band has ever confirmed a song list, these are all informed speculation. An example listing of potential songs for this album can be found in an article by Cameron Crowe from Rolling Stone #198 in October of 1975.) "Carry Me" and "Time After Time" by Crosby would show up respectively on the Crosby & Nash albums Wind on the Water and Whistling Down the Wire. "Myth of Sisyphus" and "My Angel" by Stills would appear on his next solo album. "Fieldworker" by Nash would also be included on Wind on the Water. "Mellow My Mind" by Young would be released on Tonight's the Night, and "Long May You Run" would be the title track for the album Young would record with Stills. "On the Beach" and "Revolution Blues" would be released during the tour via Young's On the Beach. CSN's cover of "Blackbird" had been recorded in the studio in early 1969, but would not be issued until the 1991 box set. Five songs by Young – "Traces", "Love Art Blues", "Hawaiian Sunrise", "Pushed It Over the End" and "Goodbye Dick" – had appeared on bootlegs and imports and all but the last one were eventually released on Neil Young Archives Volume II: 1972–1976.

The box set presents an idealized concert from the template of the shows themselves: discs one and three are full-band electric sets flanking a middle second set of acoustic songs in solo, duo, trio, and quartet configurations. The 188-page booklet contains photographs, an essay, quotes, and song information compiled by Bernstein, including which instruments were used on each song. Crosby had wanted to title the acoustic set "What Could Possibly Go Wrong?", but that was nixed by the others. The cover features Bernstein’s photo of the band performing on stage at the Oakland-Alameda County Coliseum.

== Legacy ==
Crosby dubbed this "the Doom Tour," in reference to both the difficulties in playing such large venues and the collateral excesses. To have something in the stores coinciding with the tour, Atlantic Records compiled So Far from two studio albums and both sides of the stand-alone "Ohio" single. Nash found this absurd; nevertheless the album topped the Billboard 200, and its cover drawing by Joni Mitchell would appear on everything from dinner plates to pillowcases as part of the group's travel accessories. Cocaine was also another of the tour's accessories, and tales of the group's behavior have been well chronicled. The tour gross was approximately $11 million (57.6 million in 2020 dollars); however, with a tour staff of 86 and the various extravagances, Crosby maintains that the four principals took home a surprisingly small percentage of the proceeds.

The first stadium tour, CSNY in 1974 set the precedent for every similar outing to follow. Bill Graham would work in the same capacity for the Rolling Stones on their American tours of 1975, 1978, and 1981, adding more stadium dates with each subsequent excursion. As lucrative stadium tours with their large attendances became more feasible during the 1970s, so documents of the tour such as Frampton Comes Alive! and Kiss Alive II became equally more lucrative. The promotion business of rock and popular music has not looked back since.

In the autumn after the tour, another attempt to record a new CSNY studio album in Sausalito came to naught. In a December 1995 interview, Young blamed the failure to produce an album partly on the lack of quality new material by the other three members: "If they'd had new songs with the authority that their old songs had, we could've knocked off four and five of mine so that just the best two surfaced. That would have truly been CSN&Y. But it wasn't to be, so the record never came out." There would be yet another aborted attempt during the sessions for Long May You Run, but it would also end in acrimony. The next time they completed a group album, it would be the trio and not the quartet for CSN in 1977.

== Track listing ==
Disc one
No.	Title	Writer(s)	Studio source	Length
1.	"Love the One You're With"	Stephen Stills	Stephen Stills	6:05
2.	"Wooden Ships"	David Crosby, Paul Kantner, Stephen Stills	Crosby Stills & Nash	6:36
3.	"Immigration Man"	Graham Nash	Graham Nash David Crosby	3:47
4.	"Helpless"	Neil Young	Déjà Vu	4:45
5.	"Carry Me"	David Crosby	Wind on the Water in 1975	4:41
6.	"Johnny's Garden"	Stephen Stills	Manassas	5:20
7.	"Traces"	Neil Young	previously unreleased	3:17
8.	"Grave Concern"	Graham Nash	Wild Tales	3:11
9.	"On the Beach"	Neil Young	On the Beach	7:40
10.	"Black Queen"	Stephen Stills	Stephen Stills	8:25
11.	"Almost Cut My Hair"	David Crosby	Déjà Vu	7:07

Disc two
No.	Title	Writer(s)	Studio source	Length
1.	"Change Partners"	Stephen Stills	Stephen Stills 2	3:51
2.	"The Lee Shore"	David Crosby	4 Way Street live album; CSN (box set) in 1991	4:48
3.	"Only Love Can Break Your Heart"	Neil Young	After the Gold Rush	3:28
4.	"Our House"	Graham Nash	Déjà Vu	3:38
5.	"Fieldworker"	Graham Nash	Wind on the Water in 1975	3:07
6.	"Guinevere"	David Crosby	Crosby Stills & Nash	6:14
7.	"Time After Time"	David Crosby	Whistling Down the Wire in 1976	3:48
8.	"Prison Song"	Graham Nash	Wild Tales	4:02
9.	"Long May You Run"	Neil Young	Long May You Run in 1976	4:13
10.	"Goodbye Dick"	Neil Young	previously unreleased	1:40
11.	"Mellow My Mind"	Neil Young	Tonight's the Night in 1975	2:33
12.	"Old Man"	Neil Young	Harvest	4:23
13.	"Word Game"	Stephen Stills	Stephen Stills 2	6:16
14.	"Myth of Sisyphus"	Stephen Stills, Kenny Passarelli	Stills in 1975	4:44
15.	"Blackbird"	John Lennon, Paul McCartney	Allies live album in 1983; CSN (box set) in 1991	2:48
16.	"Love Art Blues"	Neil Young	previously unreleased	2:57
17.	"Hawaiian Sunrise"	Neil Young	previously unreleased	2:56
18.	"Teach Your Children"	Graham Nash	Déjà Vu	3:16
19.	"Suite: Judy Blue Eyes"	Stephen Stills	Crosby Stills & Nash	9:25

Disc three
No.	Title	Writer(s)	Studio source	Length
1.	"Déjà Vu"	David Crosby	Déjà Vu	8:29
2.	"My Angel"	Stephen Stills	Stills in 1975	4:35
3.	"Pre-Road Downs"	Graham Nash	Crosby Stills & Nash	3:30
4.	"Don't Be Denied"	Neil Young	Time Fades Away live album	6:40
5.	"Revolution Blues"	Neil Young	On the Beach	4:21
6.	"Military Madness"	Graham Nash	Songs for Beginners	5:04
7.	"Long Time Gone"	David Crosby	Crosby Stills & Nash	6:05
8.	"Pushed It Over the End"	Neil Young	previously unreleased	7:52
9.	"Chicago"	Graham Nash	Songs for Beginners	4:43
10.	"Ohio"	Neil Young	1970 single	6:00

DVD
No.	Title	Writer(s)	Length
1.	"Only Love Can Break Your Heart"	Neil Young
2.	"Almost Cut My Hair"	David Crosby
3.	"Grave Concern"	Graham Nash
4.	"Old Man"	Neil Young
5.	"Johnny's Garden"	Stephen Stills
6.	"Our House"	Graham Nash
7.	"Déjà Vu"	David Crosby
8.	"Pushed It Over the End"	Neil Young

Audience noise was trimmed from tracks to ensure that they all fit on a single compact disc.

Single disc sampler
No.	Title	Writer(s)	Length
1.	"Love the One You're With"	Stephen Stills	6:02
2.	"Wooden Ships"	David Crosby, Paul Kantner, Stephen Stills	6:20
3.	"Immigration Man"	Graham Nash	3:45
4.	"Helpless"	Neil Young	4:33
5.	"Johnny's Garden"	Stephen Stills	5:09
6.	"The Lee Shore"	David Crosby	4:47
7.	"Change Partners"	Stephen Stills	3:24
8.	"Only Love Can Break Your Heart"	Neil Young	3:28
9.	"Our House"	Graham Nash	3:20
10.	"Guinevere"	David Crosby	5:51
11.	"Old Man"	Neil Young	3:57
12.	"Teach Your Children"	Graham Nash	3:09
13.	"Suite: Judy Blue Eyes"	Stephen Stills	8:33
14.	"Long Time Gone"	David Crosby	5:44
15.	"Chicago"	Graham Nash	4:46
16.	"Ohio"	Neil Young	5:37

Starbucks sampler
No.	Title	Writer(s)	Length
1.	"Only Love Can Break Your Heart"	Neil Young	3:28
2.	"Change Partners"	Stephen Stills	3:51
3.	"The Lee Shore"	David Crosby	4:48
4.	"Johnny's Garden"	Stephen Stills	5:20
5.	"Guinevere"	David Crosby	6:14
6.	"Our House"	Graham Nash	3:38
7.	"Prison Song"	Graham Nash	4:02
8.	"Old Man"	Neil Young	4:23
9.	"Blackbird"	John Lennon, Paul McCartney	2:48
10.	"Hawaiian Sunrise"	Neil Young	2:56
11.	"Teach Your Children"	Graham Nash	3:16
12.	"Suite: Judy Blue Eyes"	Stephen Stills	9:25

Mojo disc sampler
No.	Title	Writer(s)	Length
1.	"Almost Cut My Hair"	David Crosby	7:07
2.	"Change Partners"	Stephen Stills	3:51
3.	"Pre-Road Downs"	Graham Nash	3:30
4.	"Only Love Can Break Your Heart"	Neil Young	3:28
5.	"Carry Me"	David Crosby	4:41
6.	"Our House" (video track)	Graham Nash

== Recording dates and locations ==
8/14 Nassau Coliseum Uniondale NY

- "Goodbye Dick"
- "Mellow My Mind"

8/15 Nassau Coliseum Uniondale NY

- "Suite Judy Blue Eyes"
- "Long Time Gone"

8/19 Capital Centre Landover MD

- "Change Partners"
- "Pre-Road Downs"
- "Wooden Ships"

8/20 Capital Centre Landover MD

- "Only Love Can Break Your Heart"
- "Fieldworker"
- "Long May You Run"

8/21 Capital Centre Landover MD

- "Love the One You're With"
- "Immigration Man"
- "Traces"
- "Grave Concern"
- "Almost Cut My Hair"
- "Prison Song"
- "Teach Your Children"
- "Deja Vu"
- "Military Madness"

8/27 Chicago Stadium

- "My Angel"
- "Don't Be Denied"
- "Revolution Blues"
- "Ohio"

8/28 Chicago Stadium

- "Helpless"
- "Johnny's Garden"
- "On the Beach"

8/29 Chicago Stadium

- "Carry Me"
- "Black Queen"
- "The Lee Shore"
- "Time After Time"
- "Old Man"
- "Love Art Blues"
- "Hawaiian Sunrise"
- "Chicago"

9/14 Wembley Stadium

- "Our House"
- "Pushed It Over the End"

12/14 SF Civic Auditorium

- "Guinnevere"

== Personnel ==
- David Crosby — vocals, guitars, tambourine
- Stephen Stills — vocals, guitars, keyboards, acoustic bass guitar
- Graham Nash — vocals, keyboards, guitars, harmonica
- Neil Young — vocals, guitars, keyboards, harmonica, banjo guitar
- Tim Drummond — electric bass guitar
- Russ Kunkel — drums
- Joe Lala — percussion

=== Production personnel ===
- Graham Nash and Joel Bernstein along with Crosby, Stills, Nash & Young — producers
- Elliot Mazer, Stephen Barncard — recording engineers
- Stanley Johnston – analog-to-digital transfer and digital audio processing
- Stanley Johnston, Graham Nash, Joel Bernstein – mixing
- Bernie Grundman, Stanley Johnston – mastering
- Brian Porizek – art direction and design

=== Tour personnel ===
- Bill Graham — tour director
- Elliot Roberts, Leslie Morris, Michael John Bowen – artist management
- Chris O'Dell — tour manager
- Tim Mulligan – house sound engineer
- Barry Imhoff – head of production
- Frank Barsalona — booking agent
- Joel Bernstein – tour photographer
- Patrick Stansfield – stage manager
- Steven Cohen – lighting director
- Steve Gagne – chief audio engineer
- Jay Jones, Fred Meyers, Mark Morris, Steve Neal, Craig Reynolds – audio technicians
- Guillermo Giachetti, Glenn Goodwin, John Talbot – equipment managers
- Ben Lesko – guitar technician

== Charts ==
=== Weekly charts ===
Chart (2014)	Peak position
Austrian Albums (Ö3 Austria)	73
Belgian Albums (Ultratop Flanders)	28
Belgian Albums (Ultratop Wallonia)	56
Danish Albums (Hitlisten)	34
Dutch Albums (Album Top 100)	8
French Albums (SNEP)	44
German Albums (Offizielle Top 100)	11
Italian Albums (FIMI)	51
Norwegian Albums (VG-lista)	32
New Zealand Albums (RMNZ)	13
Spanish Albums (Promusicae)	76
Swiss Albums (Schweizer Hitparade)	41
UK Albums (Official Charts)	37
US Billboard 200	17
US Americana/Folk Albums (Billboard)	1
US Top Rock Albums (Billboard)	4

=== Year-end charts ===
Chart (2014)	Position
Belgian Albums (Ultratop Flanders)	178

== Tour dates ==
Date	City	Country	Venue	Attendance	Opening Act
Tour
July 9, 1974	Seattle	United States	Seattle Center Coliseum		Jesse Colin Young
July 10, 1974	Vancouver	Canada	Pacific National Exhibition Coliseum		The Band
July 13, 1974	Oakland, California	United States	Oakland Alameda County Coliseum	90,000	The Band Joe Walsh Jesse Colin Young
July 14, 1974	Oakland, California	United States	Oakland Alameda County Coliseum	90,000	The Band Joe Walsh Jesse Colin Young
July 16, 1974	Tempe, Arizona	United States	Tempe Stadium		Jesse Colin Young
July 19, 1974	Kansas City, Missouri	United States	Royals Stadium		The Beach Boys Jesse Colin Young
July 21, 1974	Milwaukee	United States	County Stadium	52,000	The Beach Boys Jesse Colin Young
July 22, 1974	St. Paul, Minnesota	United States	Civic Center Arena		The Band
July 25, 1974	Denver	United States	Mile High Stadium	60,000	The Beach Boys The Band Jesse Colin Young
July 28, 1974	Houston	United States	Jeppesen Stadium	40,000	The Beach Boys The Band
July 31, 1974	Irving, Texas	United States	Texas Stadium	60,000	The Beach Boys The Band Jesse Colin Young
August 5, 1974	Boston	United States	Boston Garden		The Band
August 6, 1974	Boston	United States	Boston Garden		The Band
August 8, 1974	Jersey City, New Jersey	United States	Roosevelt Stadium		The Band
August 9, 1974	Atlantic City, New Jersey	United States	Atlantic City Race Course	70,000	Santana The Band
August 10, 1974	Philadelphia, Pennsylvania	United States	Veterans Stadium		The Band
August 11, 1974	Buffalo, New York	United States	Rich Stadium		Santana Jesse Colin Young
August 14, 1974	Uniondale, New York	United States	Nassau Coliseum		Jesse Colin Young
August 15, 1974	Uniondale, New York	United States	Nassau Coliseum		Jesse Colin Young
August 17, 1974	Norfolk, Virginia	United States	Foreman Field Stadium	32,000	The Band Jesse Colin Young Elvin Bishop Band
August 19, 1974	Landover, Maryland	United States	Capital Centre		The Band Jesse Colin Young
August 20, 1974	Landover, Maryland	United States	Capital Centre		The Band
August 21, 1974	Landover, Maryland	United States	Capital Centre		The Band
August 23, 1974	Tampa, Florida	United States	Tampa Stadium	42,000	The Band Jesse Colin Young
August 25, 1974	Memphis, Tennessee	United States	Memorial Stadium		Jesse Colin Young Elvin Bishop Band
August 27, 1974	Chicago	United States	Chicago Stadium		The Band
August 28, 1974	Chicago	United States	Chicago Stadium		The Band
August 29, 1974	Chicago	United States	Chicago Stadium		The Band
August 31, 1974	Cleveland	United States	Municipal Stadium	82,000	Santana The Band Jesse Colin Young
September 2, 1974	Toronto	Canada	Varsity Stadium		The Band Jesse Colin Young
September 8, 1974	Westbury, New York	United States	Roosevelt Raceway	77,000	Joni Mitchell/LA Express The Beach Boys Jesse Colin Young
September 14, 1974	London	England	Wembley Stadium		Joni Mitchell/LA Express The Band Jesse Colin Young
