= The Best of Crosby & Nash: The ABC Years =

Greatest hits album by Crosby & Nash
- Released: 2002
- Genre: Rock
- Label: MCA
- Producer: David Crosby, Graham Nash, Stephen Barncard

Crosby & Nash chronology
Another Stoney Evening (1998)	The Best of Crosby & Nash: The ABC Years (2002)	Crosby & Nash (2004)

The Best of Crosby & Nash: The ABC Years is a compilation album from the duo of David Crosby and Graham Nash which was remastered and released in 2002. The album features music that appeared on Wind on the Water, Whistling Down the Wire and Crosby-Nash Live.

== Track listing ==
1. "Carry Me" (David Crosby)
2. "Mama Lion" (Graham Nash)
3. "Bittersweet" (Crosby)
4. "Take the Money and Run" (Nash, Rafferty)
5. "Naked in the Rain" (Crosby, Nash)
6. "Love Work Out" (Nash)
7. "Homeward Through the Haze" (Crosby)
8. "To the Last Whale... (A. Critical Mass/B. Wind on the Water)" (Crosby, Nash)
9. "Spotlight" (Danny Kortchmar, Nash)
10. "Broken Bird" (Crosby, Nash)
11. "Time After Time" (Crosby)
12. "Mutiny" (Nash)
13. "Taken at All" (Crosby, Nash)
14. "Foolish Man" (Crosby)
15. "Out of the Darkness" (Crosby, Craig Doerge, Nash)
16. "Immigration Man" (Live) (Nash)
17. "Lee Shore" (Live) (Crosby)
18. "I Used to Be a King" (Live) (Nash)
19. "Déjà Vu" (Live) (Crosby)
