= Crosby & Nash =

Musical duo (1970–2015)

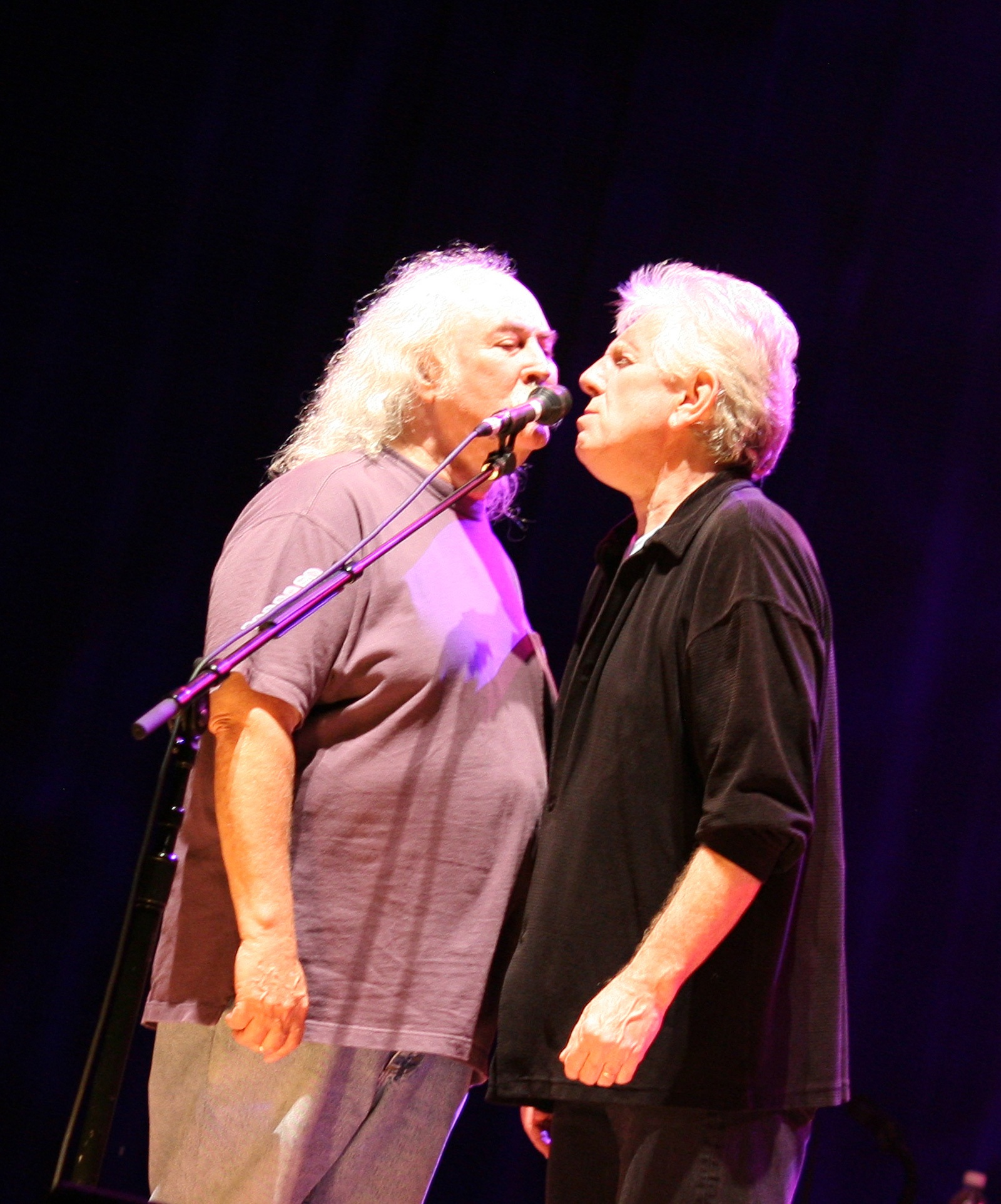
- Crosby and Nash singing while touring in 2006 with CSNY

Background information
- Origin: Los Angeles, California
- Genres: Rock, folk rock
- Years active: 1970–2015
- Labels: Atlantic, ABC, Arista, Sanctuary
- Spinoff of: Crosby, Stills, Nash & Young
- Past members: David Crosby; Graham Nash
- Website: crosbynash.com

Crosby & Nash were a musical duo that maintained a separate career in addition to the solo endeavors of David Crosby and Graham Nash, and separate from the larger aggregate of Crosby, Stills, Nash & Young. Crosby and Nash performed and recorded regularly during the 1970s, issuing five albums including three of original studio material. After the more or less permanent reformation of Crosby, Stills & Nash in 1976, the duo continued to play sporadic concerts from the 1980s through the second decade of the 21st century, issuing another studio album in 2004 and going on an extended concert tour in 2011.

== History ==
After the success of Déjà Vu and the subsequent break-up of the quartet in the summer of 1970, all four members of CSNY released solo albums. Crosby's If I Could Only Remember My Name and Nash's Songs for Beginners both appeared in 1971 and were both certified gold records by the RIAA. Building upon the momentum of a BBC-produced September 11, 1970, acoustic special shot in Manchester, the two good friends toured acoustically in the autumn of 1971 to favorable reviews; one night from this tour would be released 27 years later as Another Stoney Evening.

In 1972 the two decided to record an album, resulting in Graham Nash David Crosby, which reached No. 4 on the Billboard 200, demonstrating that the two were still a viable draw without the more successful Stills and Young. Further work together later in 1972 was precluded by Crosby's participation in the Byrds' reunion album recording sessions. In 1973, the pair began to tour regularly, also joining Neil Young for the tour that would result in his Time Fades Away album. Crosby continued to collaborate with electronic music pioneer and Grateful Dead associate Ned Lagin on Seastones (1975) and other unreleased ventures, while Nash recorded a second solo album, Wild Tales (1974). During this time, singularly and together they contributed backing vocals to various albums by associates in the California rock scene, including Stephen Stills (1970), Young's Harvest (1972), Jackson Browne's Late for the Sky (1974), and Joni Mitchell's Court and Spark (1974).

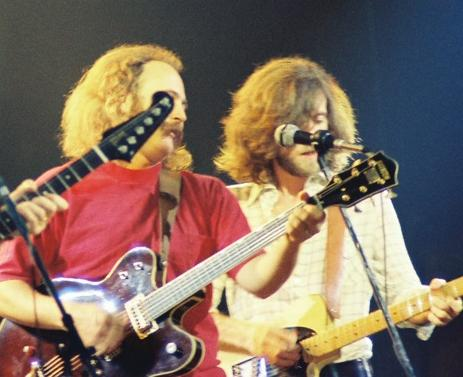
Crosby and Nash in concert in 1974

In 1974 both joined the Crosby, Stills, Nash & Young reunion tour and an attempt at the recording of a new album in Hawaii, sessions for which had continued in fits and starts after commencing in 1973. After failing to complete an album, Crosby and Nash signed a contract with ABC Records. Due to contractual obligations to their old label, the cassette and 8-track tape versions of their ABC LPs were issued by Atlantic. Recording activity yielded Wind on the Water (1975; No. 6) and Whistling Down the Wire (1976; No. 26), both of which received RIAA gold certifications.

Stephen Stills and Neil Young invited the duo to a recording session for their Long May You Run project in the spring of 1976, leading to a brief CSNY reunion. However, Crosby and Nash were forced to leave the recording sessions because they had time constraints for completing Whistling Down the Wire, prompting Stills and Young to wipe their vocals and release the album under the imprimatur of the Stills-Young Band. Crosby & Nash vowed not to work with either Stills or Young again, that oath lasting not even a year as they reconvened with Stills for the second Crosby Stills & Nash album in 1977. Young kept alternate copies of the tracks and released a version of "Long May You Run" with Crosby and Nash's vocals on his 1977 album Decade.

ABC released four albums by Crosby & Nash prior to its being bought by the MCA conglomerate in 1979. In addition to the two aforementioned studio albums, the concert document Crosby-Nash Live appeared in 1977, and a compilation (The Best of Crosby & Nash) in 1978. All four albums featured their backing band the Mighty Jitters, consisting of Craig Doerge (keyboards), Tim Drummond (bass; beginning in 1975), Danny Kortchmar (lead guitar and occasional bass), Russ Kunkel (drums), and multi-instrumentalist David Lindley (slide guitar, pedal steel guitar, viola, violin). During the recording of Wind on the Water, session bassist Leland Sklar alternated with Drummond, and the line-up of Doerge, Kortchmar, Kunkel, and Sklar recorded throughout the epoch as the Section after providing the backup for much of the first Crosby & Nash album on Atlantic. Depending upon availability of the various members, the twosome would either tour as an electric-based aggregation (exclusively with the Mighty Jitters after 1973) or in a semi-acoustic format with Doerge and Lindley. The pair's initial fall 1973 electric tour backing band omitted Kortchmar and included Jefferson Starship drummer John Barbata in lieu of Kunkel; after falling ill with influenza, Lindley was replaced for the remaining dates by future Eagles guitarist Don Felder.

When CSN reunited on a more-or-less permanent basis in 1977, Doerge followed the group to Miami for the CSN sessions and ensuing tours through 1978, also co-writing the song "Shadow Captain" with Crosby. Doerge would continue to collaborate regularly with Crosby & Nash in various permutations until the early 1990s, co-producing Nash's Innocent Eyes (1986) and Crosby's Oh Yes I Can (1989).

Following aborted CSN sessions in 1978, Crosby & Nash attempted to record a new album for Capitol Records a year later, but the project was dampened by Crosby's increased dependence upon freebase cocaine. Material from the sessions eventually appeared on Nash's Earth & Sky without any songs from Crosby. Crosby's problems during the 1980s with drugs, and his prison time, largely precluded any activity solely with Nash, although the pair appeared on the CSN and CSNY albums of that decade and resumed touring intermittently as a duo after Crosby's release. The 1990 CSN album Live It Up started as a Crosby & Nash record, but like its predecessor Daylight Again which was initially sessions for a Stills & Nash effort, Atlantic Records was reluctant to release a project that did not include the full trio.

In 2004 Crosby & Nash released their first original studio record since 1976 with the double-album Crosby & Nash on Sanctuary Records, with backing mostly by touring members of Crosby's band CPR. A single CD version was released in 2006 when CSNY began their Freedom of Speech '06 Tour. On the Graham Nash box set Reflections, released in February 2009, a recording of the track "In Your Name" from October 21, 2007, by the same band used for the Crosby & Nash album, including Crosby on backing vocals.

Nash stated in March 2016 that he would likely never work with Crosby again due to strained relations between the two; Crosby died in January 2023.

== Other work ==
In addition to their album work, Crosby & Nash were the harmony vocalists of choice for a number of prominent singer-songwriters and album-oriented rock performers in the 1970s. Their most recognizable session work includes "Love the One You're With" and "Sit Yourself Down" on Stephen Stills' 1970 Stephen Stills, "Are You Ready for the Country?" on Neil Young's 1972 Harvest album, and the hit singles "Free Man in Paris" by Joni Mitchell in 1974, "Mexico" by James Taylor in 1975, and "The Pretender" by Jackson Browne in 1976. They also appeared on albums by Dave Mason, JD Souther, Elton John, Art Garfunkel, Gary Wright, Carole King, John Mayer, and David Gilmour, as recently as on Gilmour's Rattle That Lock (2015).

== Discography ==
See also discographies for Crosby, Stills, Nash & Young, and individually for David Crosby and Graham Nash.

=== Studio albums ===
Title	Album details	Peak chart positions									Certifications
Title	Album details	US	AUS	GER	ITA	NED	NOR	SWE	UK	CAN	Certifications
Graham Nash David Crosby	Released: April 5, 1972; Label: Atlantic Records	4	18	—	—	4	11	14	13	6	US: Gold
Wind on the Water	Released: September 15, 1975; Label: ABC Records	6	—	—	—	—	—	—	—	28	US: Gold
Whistling Down the Wire	Released: June 25, 1976; Label: ABC Records	26	—	—	17	12	—	—	—	17	US: Gold
Crosby & Nash	Released: August 10, 2004; Label: Sanctuary Records	142	—	98	30	35	—	—	78	—	
"—" denotes items that did not chart or were not released in that territory.

=== Other releases ===
Title	Album details	Peak chart positions	Information
Title	Album details	US	Information
Crosby–Nash Live	Released: October 31, 1977; Label: ABC Records	52	Live
The Best of Crosby & Nash	Released: October 1978; Label: ABC Records	150	Compilation
Another Stoney Evening	Released: January 13, 1998; Label: Grateful Dead Records	—	Live
The Best of Crosby & Nash: The ABC Years	Released: October 15, 2002; Label: MCA Records	—	Compilation
Crosby & Nash: Highlights	Released: July 18, 2006; Label: Sanctuary Records	—	Sampler
Crosby–Nash: In Concert	Released: October 11, 2011; Label: Blue Castle Records	—	Live DVD
"—" denotes items that did not chart or were not released in that territory.

=== Singles ===
Year	Single	US BB	CA	Album
1972	"Immigration Man"	36	23	Graham Nash David Crosby
1972	"Southbound Train"	99	–	Graham Nash David Crosby
1975	"Love Work Out"	–	–	Wind on the Water
1975	"Carry Me"	52	65	Wind on the Water
1975	"Take the Money and Run"	103*	–	Wind on the Water
1975	"To the Last Whale"	–	–	Wind on the Water
1976	"Out of the Darkness"	89	–	Whistling Down the Wire
1976	"Spotlight"	109	–	Whistling Down the Wire
2004	"Lay Me Down"	–	–	Crosby & Nash
"—" denotes a recording that did not chart. US charts are Billboard unless otherwise noted. * Cashbox Singles Chart. "Lay Me Down" reached number 8 on the Triple A Songs chart.
