= The Best of Crosby & Nash =

Compilation album by Crosby & Nash
- Released: 1978
- Recorded: 1971–76
- Genre: Classic rock
- Label: ABC Records; Atlantic
- Producer: Stephen Barncard; Bill Halverson; David Crosby; Graham Nash

Crosby & Nash chronology
Crosby-Nash Live (1977)	The Best of Crosby & Nash (1978)	Another Stoney Evening (1998)

Professional ratings
Review scores
Source	Rating
Music Week	2/4 stars

The Best of Crosby & Nash is a compilation album by Crosby & Nash released in 1978. It features tracks from the artists' solo albums as well as by the duo, although does not contain their biggest hit as a pair, "Immigration Man". Their final album on ABC Records, it is out of print, superseded in 2002 by a survey of their work for ABC released on compact disc.

== Track listing ==
Side one
No.	Title	Writer(s)	Length
1.	"Love Work Out"	Graham Nash	4:45
2.	"The Wall Song"	David Crosby	4:37
3.	"Wild Tales"	Graham Nash	2:18
4.	"Carry Me"	David Crosby	3:35
5.	"Out of the Darkness"	David Crosby, Graham Nash, Craig Doerge	4:24

Side two
No.	Title	Writer(s)	Length
1.	"Southbound Train"	Graham Nash	3:54
2.	"Laughing "	David Crosby	5:20
3.	"Chicago"	Graham Nash	2:55
4.	"Bittersweet"	David Crosby	2:39
5.	"To the Last Whale... (A. Critical Mass/B. Wind on the Water)"	David Crosby, Graham Nash	5:35

== Personnel ==
- David Crosby – vocals all tracks except "Wild Tales" and "Chicago"; electric guitar on "Love Work Out," "The Wall Song," and "Carry Me"; guitars on "Southbound Train" and "Laughing" piano on "Bittersweet"
- Graham Nash – vocals; piano on "Love Work Out," "The Wall Song," "Chicago," and "To the Last Whale..."; guitar on "Wild Tales," "Southbound Train," "Laughing," and "Chicago"; Hammond organ on "The Wall Song" and "Chicago"; harmonica on "Southbound Train"; tambourine on "Chicago"

=== Additional personnel ===
- Craig Doerge — electric piano on "Bittersweet" and "To the Last Whale..."; Hammond organ on "Love Work Out"; piano on "Carry Me"; keyboards on "Out of the Darkness"
- Carole King — Hammond organ on "Bittersweet"
- Jerry Garcia – pedal steel guitar on "Southbound Train" and "Laughing"; electric guitar on "The Wall Song"
- Danny Kortchmar — electric guitar on "Love Work Out," "Out of the Darkness," and "Bittersweet"
- David Lindley — slide guitar on "Love Work Out," "Wild Tales," and "Out of the Darkness"
- James Taylor — guitar on "Carry Me" and "To the Last Whale..."; backing vocals on "To the Last Whale..."
- Tim Drummond — bass on "Love Work Out," "Wild Tales," and "Out of the Darkness"
- Leland Sklar — bass on "Carry Me," "Bittersweet," and "To the Last Whale..."
- Chris Ethridge – bass on "Southbound Train" and "Chicago"
- Phil Lesh – bass on "The Wall Song" and "Laughing"
- Russ Kunkel — drums on "Love Work Out," "Carry Me," "Out of the Darkness," "Bittersweet," and "To the Last Whale..."
- John Barbata – drums on "Wild Tales," "Southbound Train," and "Chicago"; tambourine on "Chicago"
- Bill Kreutzmann – drums on "The Wall Song" and "Laughing"
- Jackson Browne — backing vocals on "Love Work Out"
- Joni Mitchell — backing vocals on "Laughing"
- Venetta Fields, Sherlie Matthews, Clydie King, Dorothy Morrison, Rita Coolidge – backing vocals on "Chicago"
- Jimmie Haskell — string arrangements on "To the Last Whale..."
- Lee Holdridge — string arrangements on "Out of the Darkness"
- Sid Sharp — orchestra leader on "Wind on the Water" and "Out of the Darkness"

== Charts ==
Chart (1978)	Peak position
US Billboard Top LPs	150
US Cash Box Top 100 Albums	145
