= Crosby–Nash Live =

Live album by Crosby & Nash
- Released: October 31, 1977
- Recorded: September 7, 1975 – September 11, 1976
- Genre: Rock
- Length: 41:50 (LP); 51:36 (CD)
- Labels: ABC Records; MCA Records (1979)
- Producers: David Crosby, Graham Nash, Don Gooch, Stephen Barncard

Crosby & Nash chronology
Whistling Down the Wire (1976)	Crosby–Nash Live (1977)	The Best of Crosby & Nash (1978)

Professional ratings
Review scores
Source	Rating
Allmusic	3/5 stars

Crosby–Nash Live is a 1977 live album released by Crosby & Nash. It was remastered and re-released in 2000 with one previously unreleased recording ("Bittersweet"), and one previously unreleased recording and song ("King of the Mountain").

== Track listing ==
Side one
No.	Title	Writer(s)	Length
1.	"Immigration Man"	Graham Nash	3:40
2.	"The Lee Shore"	David Crosby	5:17
3.	"I Used to Be a King"	Nash	4:46
4.	"King of the Mountain (bonus track)"	Crosby	6:34
5.	"Page 43"	Crosby	3:44
6.	"Fieldworker"	Nash	3:26

Side two
No.	Title	Writer(s)	Length
1.	"Simple Man"	Nash	2:58
2.	"Foolish Man"	Crosby	4:41
3.	"Bittersweet (bonus track)"	Crosby	3:15
4.	"Mama Lion"	Nash	3:28
5.	"Déjà Vu"	Crosby	9:49

== Personnel ==
- David Crosby – vocals, rhythm guitars
- Graham Nash – vocals, pianos, rhythm guitars
- David Lindley – slide guitar, violin
- Danny Kortchmar – lead guitars
- Tim Drummond – bass
- Craig Doerge – pianos, synthesizers, melodica
- Russ Kunkel – drums

== Production ==
- Produced by David Crosby, Graham Nash, Don Gooch and Stephen Barncard
- Live sound engineer – Bryan Jonathan
- Remote engineers – Ray Thompson and Don Gooch
- Remote facilities – Wally Heider Recording in LA, Record Plant White Truck in NY
- Assistant engineer NY – David Hewitt
- Remix engineers – Stephen Barncard and Don Gooch
- Reissue produced by Stephen Barncard and Mike Ragogna
- Tracks 4 and 9 remixed by Stephen Barncard (November 3 and 4, 1999)
  - Assisted by Sander De Jong
- Art direction and design – Gary Burden
- Back photography – Henry Diltz
- Cover and band photography – Joel Bernstein
- Inside photography – Marianna Diamos

== Recording dates ==
- Tracks 1 and 3 – Garden State Arts Center Center]], Homdel, NJ (August 28, 1976)
- Track 2 – Syria Mosque, Pittsburgh, PA (August 24, 1976) and the Shaefer Music Festival, New York City, NY (September 11, 1976)
- Track 4 – Schaefer Music Festival, New York City, NY (September 10, 1976)
- Tracks 5 and 6 – Blossom Music Festival, Akron, OH (August 26, 1976)
- Tracks 7 and 10 – Zellerbach Auditorium, Berkeley, CA (November 21, 1975)
- Track 8 – Anaheim Convention Center, Anaheim, CA (May 23, 1976)
- Track 9 – Beacon Theatre, New York City, NY (September 7, 1975)
- Track 11 – Schaefer Music Festival, New York City, NY (September 8 and 11, 1976)

== Charts ==
Chart (1977)	Peak position
US Billboard Top LPs	52
US Cash Box Top 100 Albums	74
US Record World Album Chart	82

== Releases ==
- CD Live Universal Special Products / MCA 2000
- Digi Live Universal Special Products / MCA 2006
- CD Live Atlantic
- LP Live Universal Special Products
