= The Mutiny Hotel =

Hotel in Coconut Grove, Florida

- Sailboat Bay Hotel
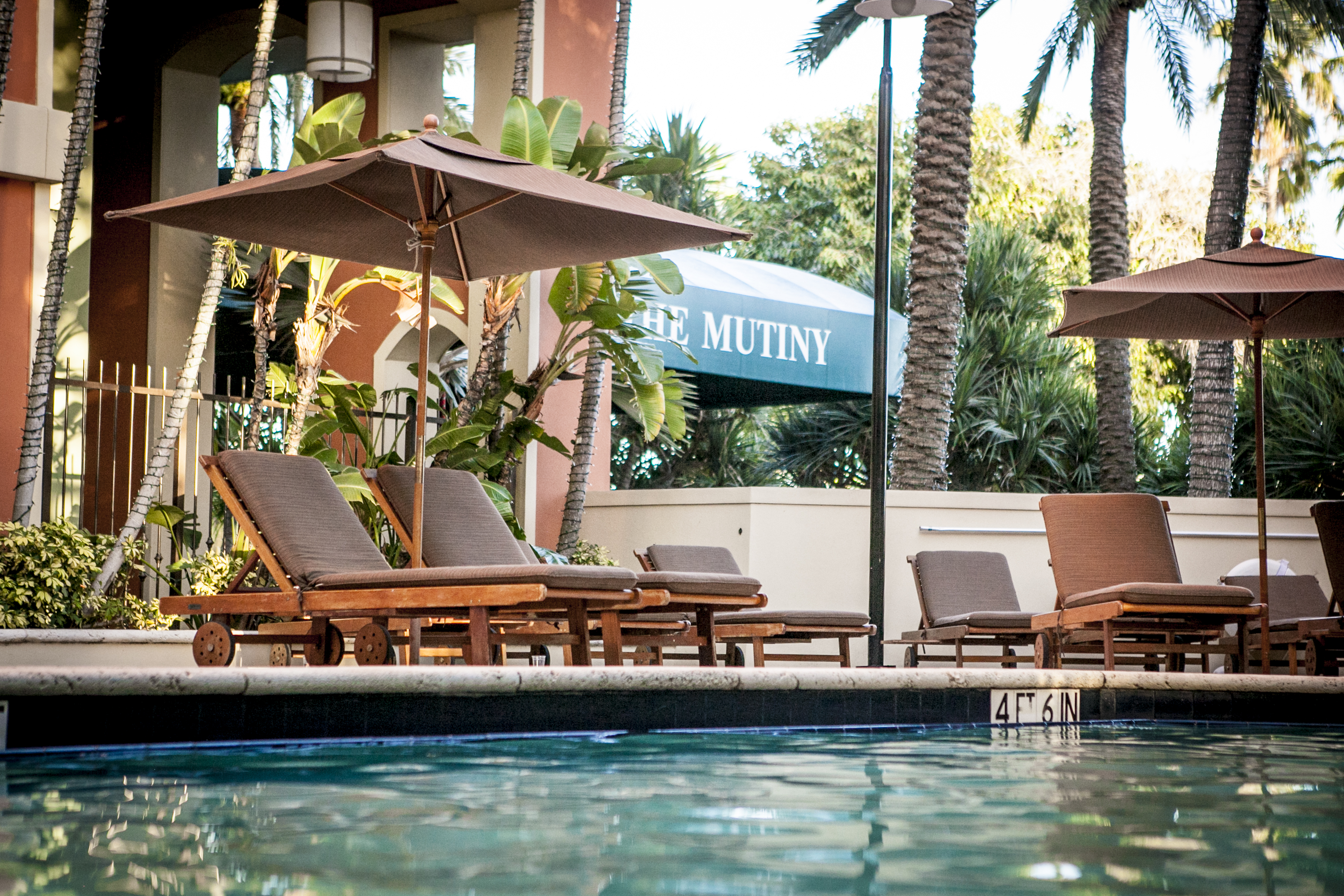
- The Mutiny Hotel pool area

- Location within Miami Location within Florida Location within the United States
- Alternative names: The Mutiny Hotel on the Bay in Coconut Grove
- Hotel chain: Provident Resorts

General information
- Status: Luxury Hotel Resort
- Type: High-Rise
- Architectural style: Postmodern
- Location: Miami-Dade County, Florida, 2951 South Bayshore Drive, Coconut Grove, United States of America
- Coordinates: 25.7273°N 80.2400°W
- Elevation: 2 metres (6.6 ft)
- Completed: June 1968
- Opened: 1969
- Renovated: 1998
- Closed: 1985
- Cost: $3,800,000

Height
- Height: 41.93 m (137 ft 7 in)

Technical details
- Material: Concrete
- Floor count: Twelve

Design and construction
- Architects: Thurston Hatcher; Sackman 2 Architects

Other information
- Number of rooms: 90
- Number of suites: 90
- Number of restaurants: 1
- Number of bars: 1

Website
- The Mutiny Hotel

The Mutiny Hotel or The Mutiny Hotel on the Bay in Coconut Grove is a luxury hotel and resort located at Biscayne Bay on the Eastern Seaboard southwest of the Downtown Miami Historic District and Miami Beach Architectural District.

== History ==
Sailboat Bay was built by Burton Goldberg in the Coconut Grove Historic District in 1968 as a 105-suite apartment building costing $3.5 million. In constructing the complex, described as Coconut Grove's first high-rise, 100 coral boulders were shipped from west Dade County. The apartments were converted to hotel units in 1976. The Mutiny name was first associated with a private club on the property opened in 1971. During the 1970s and 1980s the clientele included athletes, Hollywood celebrities, and musicians, including Led Zeppelin, Fleetwood Mac, and Crosby & Nash, whose song "Mutiny" on their Whistling Down the Wire album is a tribute to this hotel; it drew comparisons to Studio 54. Hotel rooms were themed, including the Bordello Room, Gypsy Caravan, and Hot Fudge.

In 1983, a consortium of investors was loaned $13.5 million by the Sunrise Savings and Loan to buy the hotel, in part based on an appraisal that the hotel was worth $5 million more than it actually was. The borrowers defaulted, Sunrise sank into receivership over a series of bad loans in 1985, and efforts began to sell the property. However, that ownership coincided with a dramatic decline in quality. The Mutiny went from being the premier business hotel in the area to a "drug den" over the course of the 1980s, gaining a reputation as a preferred hotel of "cocaine cowboys". Ricardo "Monkey" Morales used it as an office, and one drug dealer, Carlos Fernando Quesada, had a private table. In one famous 1980 incident, two men who were likely freebasers burned a bundle of cash and scrambled 10 floors down the balcony in an attempt to evade police. The Mutiny was depicted in the movie Scarface as the Babylon Club; Goldberg refused to allow filming on the property, so it was recreated in West Palm Beach. In 1987, police stormed a party held at the Mutiny with 100 attendees.

The Stadler Development Companies of Coral Gables and two Boston developers purchased the hotel from the Federal Savings and Loan Insurance Corporation in 1989 with the intention of converting it to an all-suite property. Later that year, the group assigned its rights to Miami developer Manny Medina. Medina closed the hotel in preparation for major renovations, but neighborhood activists opposed a plan to reconstruct the parking garage. In 1991, a decline in the economy led Citibank to foreclose on Medina's mansion, and the project was put on hold. Abandoned for years and with its furnishings having been auctioned off in 1990, the building was subject to break-ins and the subject of neighbor complaints.

In 1996, Flagler Development bought the structure, which at that point was merely a structural shell due to asbestos abatement work, with the intention of converting it into 178 condominiums that their owners could also rent out. The $28 million renovation concluded in late 1998, and the hotel reopened in April 1999, with Coastal Hotel Group and Provident Resorts operating it. Another renovation was conducted in 2010.

In 2017, journalist Roben Farzad wrote a book, Hotel Scarface: Where Cocaine Cowboys Partied and Plotted to Control Miami, on the hotel's heyday, recalling the years when it was a "criminal free-trade zone" and the leading seller of Dom Pérignon in the world.

== Bibliography ==
Bramson, Seth H. (2005). Miami Beach ~ Images of America. Charleston, South Carolina: Arcadia Publishing. ISBN 978-0738541747. OCLC 62219998.
Bramson, Seth H. (2007). Miami: The Magic City ~ Images of America. Charleston, South Carolina: Arcadia Publishing. ISBN 978-0738543680. OCLC 85822162.
Parks, Arva Moore; Bennett, Bo (2010). Coconut Grove ~ Images of America. Mount Pleasant, South Carolina: Arcadia Publishing. ISBN 978-1439626382. OCLC 639158591.
Kushlan, James A.; Hines, Kirsten N. (2014). Key Biscayne ~ Images of America. Charleston, South Carolina: Arcadia Publishing. ISBN 978-1467113229. OCLC 898889960.
