= An Díolaim =

Compilation album by Clannad
- Released: 1998
- Genre: Irish traditional music, folk, folk rock
- Label: Gael Linn

Clannad chronology
Landmarks (1998)	An Díolaim (1998)	A Magical Gathering: The Clannad Anthology (2003)

Professional ratings
Review scores
Source	Rating
Allmusic	3/5 stars

An Díolaim (Irish pronunciation: [ənˠ ˈdʲiːlˠəmˠ]; meaning 'The Collection') is an anthology album by the Irish group Clannad. It consists of 14 of their Irish traditional music recordings (originally released on the 1975 Clannad 2 and 1976 Dúlamán albums) and was released by Gael Linn Records.

== Track listing ==
1. "Dúlamán"^{*}
2. "Eleanor Plunkett"
3. "Two Sisters"^{*}
4. "Fairly Shot of Her"
5. "Siúil a Rúin"^{*}
6. "Dhéanainn Súgradh"
7. "The Galtee Hunt"^{*}
8. "By Chance It Was"
9. "Rince Philib a' Cheoil"
10. "Gaoth Barra na dTonn"
11. "Cumha Eoghain Rua Uí Néill"^{*}
12. "An Gabhar Bán (The White Goat)"
13. "Chuaigh Mé na Rosann"
14. "Coinleach Ghlas an Fhómhair"

[^{*} Tracks originally included on Dúlamán; all others are from Clannad 2.]

== Charts ==
- UK: 35
