= Graham Nash David Crosby =

Studio album by Crosby & Nash
- Released: April 5, 1972
- Recorded: 1972
- Studios: Wally Heider Studio III, Los Angeles, CA
- Genre: Rock
- Length: 35:26
- Label: Atlantic
- Producers: David Crosby, Graham Nash, Bill Halverson

Crosby & Nash chronology
Graham Nash David Crosby (1972)	Wind on the Water (1975)

Professional ratings
Review scores
Source	Rating
AllMusic	4/5 stars
Christgau's Record Guide	C−

Graham Nash David Crosby is the first album by Crosby & Nash, the partnership of David Crosby and Graham Nash, released on Atlantic Records in 1972, catalog SD 7220. It peaked at No. 4 on the Billboard 200 albums chart, and a single taken from the album, "Immigration Man", peaked at No. 36 on the Billboard Hot 100 on June 17 and 24, 1972. It was certified gold by the RIAA, and it was dedicated to Joni Mitchell, as "to Miss Mitchell".

== History ==
After the split of Crosby, Stills, Nash & Young in the summer of 1970, all four members would release solo albums over the next 12 months. Neil Young and Stephen Stills would both pursue independent band projects through the early years of the decade, Young working with Crazy Horse and the Stray Gators, with Stills assembling Manassas. Both If I Could Only Remember My Name and Songs for Beginners respectively by Crosby and Nash fared well in the marketplace, and in the autumn of 1971 the duo embarked on a series of concerts together, unable or unwilling to include Stills and Young. However, Stills joined them for the September 30 performance at Carnegie Hall in New York. "Blacknotes" was recorded live, just before Stills took the stage for the second set. Two other live recordings from this concert were released in 2006 on Crosby's Voyage Box Set: "The Lee Shore" and "Traction in the Rain." All four members reunited at the Boston Music Hall on October 3 and back at Carnegie Hall the next night. The success of the tour led Crosby and Nash to take the new songs auditioned on the road into the recording studio.

== Content ==
Sessions for this album featured backing from notable guests Dave Mason and members of The Grateful Dead — Jerry Garcia, Phil Lesh and Bill Kreutzmann. Most of the musical support came from The Section, a quartet of in-demand session musicians on the West Coast in the 1970s. Consisting of Craig Doerge, Danny Kortchmar, Leland Sklar, and Russell Kunkel, they would appear on dozens of albums, notably those by James Taylor, Carole King, and Jackson Browne. They would also continue to work with Crosby & Nash for the remainder of the decade, both in the studio and on tour.

The songs continued the qualities that marked the pair's work with the larger aggregate, with Nash writing tighter pop songs including the album's hit, and Crosby exploring mood pieces and introspection, all amidst the duo's usual vocal harmonies. The commercial success of this album equaled that of the pair's two solo albums of the previous year, although it would not be until after the second break-up of CSNY following their 1974 summer tour that Crosby and Nash would sign an album contract as a unit with ABC Records. Following the release of this album, the duo toured in 1973 with a backing band including, at different times, David Lindley and future Eagles guitarist Don Felder.

The album was remastered for compact disc in 1998 as part of the Atlantic Original Sound series: 50 titles reissued in Europe to celebrate Atlantic Records' fiftieth anniversary. It is currently out of print, and American reissues still around use first generation digital remastering from the 1980s.

== Track listing ==
=== Side one ===
No.	Title	Writer(s)	Length
1.	"Southbound Train"	Graham Nash	3:54
2.	"Whole Cloth"	David Crosby	4:35
3.	"Blacknotes"	Nash	0:58
4.	"Stranger's Room"	Nash	2:28
5.	"Where Will I Be?"	Crosby	3:23
6.	"Page 43"	Crosby	2:56

=== Side two ===
No.	Title	Writer(s)	Length
1.	"Frozen Smiles"	Nash	2:17
2.	"Games"	Crosby	4:02
3.	"Girl to Be on My Mind"	Nash	3:27
4.	"The Wall Song"	Crosby	4:37
5.	"Immigration Man"	Nash	3:02

== Personnel ==
- David Crosby – vocals all tracks except "Blacknotes"; electric guitar on "Whole Cloth", "Page 43", "Frozen Smiles", "Girl to Be on My Mind", "The Wall Song" and "Immigration Man"; guitars on "Southbound Train", "Where Will I Be?" and "Games"
- Graham Nash – vocals; acoustic piano on "Whole Cloth", "Blacknotes", "Stranger's Room", "Frozen Smiles", "The Wall Song" and "Immigration Man"; Hammond organ on "Girl to Be on My Mind" and "The Wall Song"; harmonica on "Southbound Train", "Stranger's Room" and "Frozen Smiles"; guitar on "Southbound Train"

=== Additional personnel ===
- Danny Kortchmar – electric guitar on "Whole Cloth", "Stranger's Room", "Page 43", "Frozen Smiles", "Games" and "Girl to Be on My Mind"
- Jerry Garcia – pedal steel guitar on "Southbound Train"; electric guitar on "The Wall Song"
- Dave Mason – electric guitar on "Immigration Man"
- Craig Doerge – electric piano on "Whole Cloth", "Where Will I Be?" and "Frozen Smiles"; acoustic piano on "Page 43", "Games" and "Girl to Be on My Mind"; Hammond organ on "Stranger's Room"
- Leland Sklar – bass on "Whole Cloth", "Stranger's Room", "Where Will I Be?", "Page 43", "Frozen Smiles", "Games" and "Girl to Be on My Mind"
- Chris Ethridge – bass on "Southbound Train"
- Phil Lesh – bass on "The Wall Song"
- Greg Reeves – bass on "Immigration Man"
- Russ Kunkel – drums on "Whole Cloth", "Stranger's Room", "Page 43", "Frozen Smiles", "Games" and "Girl to Be on My Mind"
- John Barbata – drums on "Southbound Train" and "Immigration Man"
- Bill Kreutzmann – drums on "The Wall Song"
- David Duke, Arthur Maebe, George Price – French horns on "Stranger's Room"
- Dana Africa – flute on "Where Will I Be?"

=== Production ===
- Crosby & Nash, Bill Halverson – producers
- Bill Halverson, Doc Storch – engineers
- Jean Ristori – digital mastering
- Robert Hammer – photography
- David Geffen, Elliot Roberts – direction

== Charts ==
Chart performance for Graham Nash David Crosby
Chart (1972)	Peak position
US Billboard Top LPs	4
UK Album Charts	13
Canadian RPM 100 Albums	6
Dutch MegaCharts Albums	4
Australian Go-Set Top 20 Albums	18
Norwegian VG-lista Albums	11
Swedish Kvällstoppen Chart	11
US Cash Box Top 100 Albums	4
US Record World Album Chart	2

Singles

Sales chart performance for singles from Graham Nash David Crosby
Year	Single	Chart	Position
1972	"Immigration Man"	US Billboard Hot 100	36
1972	"Immigration Man"	Canada RPM Singles	23
1972	"Immigration Man"	US Top Singles (Cash Box)	31
1972	"Immigration Man"	US Top Singles (Record World)	25
1972	"Southbound Train"	US Billboard Hot 100	99
1972	"Southbound Train"	US Top Singles (Cash Box)	101
1972	"Southbound Train"	US Top Singles (Record World)	75

== Certification ==
Region	Certification	Certified units/sales
United States (RIAA)	Gold	500,000^{^}
^{^} Shipments figures based on certification alone.

== Tour ==
Crosby & Nash tour dates surrounding this album.

Date	City	Country	Venue	Notes
11 September 1970	Manchester	United Kingdom	BBC Studios	
Date	City	Country	Venue	
30 January 1971	Detroit	United States	University Of Detroit	
10 September 1971	Vancouver	Canada	Queen Elizabeth Theatre	
11 September 1971	Seattle	United States	Paramount Theater	
14 September 1971	Kansas City	United States	Music Hall	
15 September 1971	St. Louis	United States		
17 September 1971	Milwaukee	United States		
18 September 1971	Chicago	United States	Arie Crown Theatre	
19 September 1971	Minneapolis	United States		
21 September 1971	Cincinnati	United States	Taft Theatre	
22 September 1971	Columbus	United States		
24 September 1971	Detroit	United States		
25 September 1971	Cleveland	United States		
27 September 1971	Montreal	Canada		
28 September 1971	Toronto	Canada		
30 September 1971	New York City	United States	Carnegie Hall	Stephen Stills guests
1 October 1971	Hartford	United States	Bushnell Auditorium	
3 October 1971	Boston	United States	Boston Music Hall	Stephen Stills and Neil Young guest
4 October 1971	New York City	United States	Carnegie Hall	
5 October 1971	Philadelphia	United States	Academy Of Music	
7 October 1971	Dallas	United States		
10 October 1971	Los Angeles	United States	Dorothy Chandler Pavilion	source for Another Stoney Evening
11 October 1971	Los Angeles	United States	Royce Hall	
14 October 1971	Berkerley	United States	Berkeley Community Theatre	
15 October 1971	Berkerley	United States	Berkeley Community Theatre	
17 October 1971	Cupertino	United States	Flint Centre	
2 December 1971	Manchester	United Kingdom	Manchester Odeon	
4 December 1971	London	United Kingdom	Royal Festival Hall	
Date	City	Country	Venue	
11 March 1972	Berkeley	United States	Berkeley Community Theatre	
26 March 1972	San Francisco	United States	Winterland Ballroom	Neil Young guests
Date	City	Country	Venue	
11 March 1973	Bakersfield	United States	Memorial Stadium	
29 August 1973	Illinois	United States	Southern Illinois University	
1 September 1973	New York	United States	Saratoga Performing Arts Centre	
5 September 1973	New York	United States	Barton Hall	
28 October 1973	Boston	United States	Boston Music Hall	
7 November 1973	New Jersey	United States	Capitol Theatre	
10 November 1973	South Bend	United States	Athletics And Convocation Centre	
15 November 1973	Durham	United States	Cameron Indoor Stadium	
26 November 1973	Atlanta	United States	Municipal Auditorium	
28 November 1973	Auburn	United States	Memorial Coliseum	
Date	City	Country	Venue	
14 December 1974	San Francisco	United States		
