= Something to Believe In (Clannad song) =

- Moya on the cover of the single.

Single by Clannad & Bruce Hornsby

from the album Sirius
- Released: September 1987
- Genre: Traditional Irish: folk; Celtic; rock; Pop; new-age
- Length: 4:47 [Album version] 4:05 [Radio edit]
- Label: BMG
- Songwriter: Ciarán Brennan
- Producers: Greg Ladanyi & Russ Kunkel

Clannad & Bruce Hornsby singles chronology
"Robin (The Hooded Man)" (1986)	"Something to Believe In" (1987)	"White Fool" (1988)

Audio sample
- file; help

"Something to Believe In" is a song by Irish group Clannad and American musician Bruce Hornsby. It was the first single released by Clannad from their 1987 album Sirius.

A music video was created for the song, which was produced by Ben Gossett through Midnight Films and directed by Meiert Avis. The video was aired on The Chart Show in October of that year. The song received some airplay on KKSF, a San Francisco radio station classified by Billboard as playing adult alternative music.

== Critical reception ==
Music Week wrote that the song's "smooth, evocative sound is effectively complimented here by Bruce Hornsby's dynamic piano playing for a striking preview of their forthcoming LP, Sirius." Music & Media characterised it a "quiet, ethereal song" and highlighted Hornsby's "lingering piano" work on the track. Sound on Sound highlighted the song as an "excellent track" in a 1993 write-up of the band.

== Track listing ==
7" (PB 41543)

1. "Something to Believe In"
2. "Second Nature"

12" (PT 41544)

1. "Something to Believe In"
2. "Second Nature"
3. "In a Lifetime"

== Personnel ==
- Clannad – vocals and instrumentation
- Bruce Hornsby – harmony vocals, piano
- Jai Winding – keyboards
- Peter-John Vettese – keyboard solo
- Phillip Donnelly – electric guitar
- Russ Kunkel – drums
