= A Magical Gathering: The Clannad Anthology =

Greatest hits album by Clannad
- Released: 16 April 2002
- Genre: Irish traditional, folk, folk rock, Celtic, new age, pop
- Label: Rhino, BMG

Clannad chronology
An Díolaim (1998)	A Magical Gathering: The Clannad Anthology (2002)	The Best of Clannad: In a Lifetime (2003)

Professional ratings
Review scores
Source	Rating
Allmusic	3/5 stars
The State	3.5/5 stars
Fort Worth Star-Telegram	4/5 stars

A Magical Gathering: The Clannad Anthology is a greatest-hits anthology album by Clannad, released by Rhino Records and BMG in 2002. With performances in English and Irish Gaelic, the two-disc collection has 34 tracks released between 1973 and 1998, spanning the career of the group.

== Track listing ==
=== CD 1 ===
1. "Níl Sé'n Lá" – 5:02
2. "Thíos Cois na Trá Domh" – 3:07
3. "Teidhir Abhaile Riú" – 2:48
4. "Fairly Shot of Her" – 2:20
5. "Dúlamán" – 4:26
6. "The Galtee Hunt" – 3:10
7. "Siúil a Rúin" – 5:48
8. "Bruach na Carraige Báine" – 2:37
9. "An tÚll" – 3:06
10. "Coinleach Ghlas an Fhómhair" – 5:58
11. "Thíos Fán Chósta" – 3:16
12. "Theme from Harry's Game" – 3:40
13. "Newgrange" – 4:05

=== CD 2 ===
1. "Robin (The Hooded Man)" (theme from Robin of Sherwood) – 2:49
2. "Now Is Here" – 3:07
3. "Ancient Forest" – 2:59
4. "Caisleán Óir" – 2:09
5. "In a Lifetime" (feat. Bono) – 3:06
6. "Almost Seems (Too Late to Turn)" – 4:51
7. "Buachaill Ón Éirne" – 3:10
8. "Second Nature" – 3:21
9. "Something to Believe In" (feat. Bruce Hornsby) – 4:48
10. "Sirius" – 3:34
11. "Rí na Cruinne" – 3:58
12. "The Poison Glen" – 3:56
13. "I Will Find You" – 5:06
14. "Banba Óir" – 3:27
15. "Seanchas" – 4:56
16. "Croí Cróga" – 5:01
17. "An Gleann" – 4:51
18. "A Mhuirnín Ó" – 4:59
19. "I Will Find You" – 1:48
