= King Bees =

American rhythm and blues group

- Origin: New York City
- Genres: Rhythm and blues
- Years active: 1964–1966
- Label: RCA
- Spinoffs: Flying Machine, Jo Mama
- Past members: Danny Kootch; Joel O'Brien; Dickie Frank; John McDuffy

The King Bees were an American New York-based rhythm and blues musical group of the 1960s.

The King Bees were formed around 1964, and consisted of Danny Kortchmar (credited as Danny Kootch) (guitar), Joel O'Brien (drums), Dickie Frank (bass) and John McDuffy (vocals and organ). They released three singles on RCA Records.

After the group disbanded, Kortchmar and O'Brien met again in the Flying Machine, fronted by then-unknown James Taylor, and were later to reunite in Jo Mama.

== Discography ==
- 1965: "That Ain't Love" / "What She Does To Me"
- 1966: "Rhythm And Blues" / "On Your Way Down To Drain"
- 1966: "Lost In The Shuffle" / "Hardly - Part III"
