= Wind on the Water =

Studio album by Crosby & Nash
- Released: September 15, 1975
- Recorded: Rudy Records, San Francisco, California; Sound Labs and Village Recorders, Los Angeles, California
- Genre: Rock
- Length: 40:57
- Labels: ABC Records (1975); MCA Records (2000)
- Producers: David Crosby, Graham Nash, Stephen Barncard

Crosby & Nash chronology
Graham Nash/David Crosby (1972)	Wind on the Water (1975)	Whistling Down the Wire (1976)

Singles from Wind on the Water
- 1. "Love Work Out" Released: 1975; 2. "Carry Me" Released: 1975; 3. "Take the Money and Run" Released: 1975; 4. "To the Last Whale" Released: 1975

Professional ratings
Review scores
Source	Rating
Allmusic	4/5 stars

Wind on the Water is the second album by Crosby & Nash, released on ABC Records in 1975. Cassette and 8-track tape versions of the album were distributed by Atlantic Records, to which Crosby, Stills, Nash & Young were signed. It peaked at No. 6 on the Billboard 200 album chart and was certified gold by the RIAA. Three singles were released from the album, "Carry Me", "Take the Money and Run", and "Love Work Out", of which only the first charted, peaking at No. 52 on the Billboard Hot 100 singles chart.

== Background ==
After the summer 1974 tour by Crosby, Stills, Nash & Young, the quartet made a second attempt at a new CSNY studio album. Like the attempt from 1973, this proved fruitless, although the track "Through My Sails" showed up on the 1975 Zuma album by Neil Young. The quartet pursued their own directions, Young forming a new version of Crazy Horse to record Zuma, and Stephen Stills resuming his solo career with a new album in early 1975. David Crosby and Graham Nash opted to reactivate the partnership that had yielded tours in 1971 and 1973 and an album in 1972. This time they made it a going concern, signing a three-album deal with ABC Records, of which this album was the first of their contract.

== Content ==
As on their debut album, most of the instrumental backing was provided by the group of session musicians known as The Section. This quartet consisting of keyboardist Craig Doerge, guitarist Danny Kortchmar, bassist Leland Sklar, and drummer Russell Kunkel, along with multi-instrumentalist David Lindley and bassist Tim Drummond, would be dubbed by Crosby as 'The Mighty Jitters' and provide support for the duo both on stage and in the studio for the remainder of the decade. Sessions for the album took place at Rudy Recorders in San Francisco, and the Sound Lab and Village Recorders in Los Angeles.

Entering their mid-thirties, Crosby and Nash explored darker, trenchant themes in their lyrics for this album, "Carry Me" referencing the death of Crosby's mother, with "Wind on the Water" an elegiac plea concerning the slaughter of whales. As usual, songs topics included personal issues and friends: "Mama Lion" purportedly about Joni Mitchell; "Cowboy of Dreams" about Young; and "Take the Money and Run" concerning the financial aftermath to the mammoth CSNY 1974 tour. Two songs feature the first issued writing collaborations of Nash and Crosby. The one on side two that closes the album, "To the Last Whale...", links two separate compositions: an a cappella sketch by Crosby "Critical Mass", into the title track by Nash.

Wind on the Water was reissued for compact disc on January 11, 2000, on MCA Records. On April 24, 2001, the album was repackaged as Bittersweet on the European budget label Hallmark Records from a second-generation master tape and issued in Europe only. In 2002, the album was released in the Netherlands for European distribution under the title The Magic Collection: Crosby and Nash, on the low-budget label ABC Records, in the series "The Magic Collection" (a division of Telesonic Holland). In 2008, the album was reissued in the UK, for the local and European distribution, on Landmark label (a division of Entertain Me Europe Ltd.), this time under the title Take the Money and Run. There was a vinyl-only reissue of the original album on Invisible Hands Music in August 2016.

In 2008, the album was reissued with a live concert from an FM broadcast recorded at the San Francisco Civic Auditorium, 14 December 1974 at a concert to benefit the United Farmworkers' Union and Project Jonah.

== Track listing ==
Side one
No.	Title	Writer(s)	Length
1.	"Carry Me"	David Crosby	3:35
2.	"Mama Lion"	Graham Nash	3:17
3.	"Bittersweet"	Crosby	2:39
4.	"Take the Money and Run"	Nash	3:23
5.	"Naked in the Rain"	Crosby; Nash	2:27
6.	"Love Work Out"	Nash	4:45

Side two
No.	Title	Writer(s)	Length
1.	"Low Down Payment"	Crosby	4:54
2.	"Cowboy of Dreams"	Nash	3:30
3.	"Homeward Through the Haze"	Crosby	4:06
4.	"Fieldworker"	Nash	2:47
5.	"To the Last Whale..." a. "Critical Mass" (Crosby) b. "Wind on the Water" (Nash)	Crosby; Nash	5:33

=== 2008 bonus disc ===
No.	Title	Writer(s)	Length
1.	"Deja Vu"	Crosby	5:25
2.	"Lady of the Island"	Nash	3:55
3.	"Prison Song"	Nash	3:41
4.	"Carry Me"	Crosby	4:30
5.	"Calley's Song"	Nash	2:37
6.	"Another Sleep Song"	Nash	3:43
7.	"King of the Mountain"	Crosby	3:58
8.	"Time After Time"	Crosby	3:41
9.	"Guinevere"	Crosby	6:12
10.	"Fieldworker"	Nash	4:29
11.	"The Last Whale"	Nash, Crosby	4:02
12.	"Wooden Ships"	Crosby, Stephen Stills, Paul Kantner	5:33
13.	"What Are Their Names?"	Crosby	0:58
14.	"Chicago"	Nash	5:04
15.	"Long Time Gone"	Crosby	6:30

== Personnel ==
- David Crosby — vocals; electric guitar on "Carry Me", "Mama Lion", "Love Work Out", "Low Down Payment", "Homeward Through the Haze" and "Fieldworker"; twelve-string guitar on "Carry Me"; guitar on "Naked in the Rain"; acoustic piano on "Bittersweet"
- Graham Nash — vocals; electric guitar on "Mama Lion", "Low Down Payment" and "Cowboy of Dreams"; acoustic piano on "Love Work Out", "Fieldworker" and "To the Last Whale..."; Hammond organ on "Homeward Through the Haze"; congas on "Naked in the Rain"

Additional personnel

- Craig Doerge — electric piano on "Bittersweet", "Naked in the Rain", "Low Down Payment", "Homeward Through the Haze" and "To the Last Whale..."; acoustic piano on "Carry Me", "Mama Lion", "Low Down Payment" and "Cowboy of Dreams"; Hammond organ on "Love Work Out"
- Carole King — Hammond organ on "Bittersweet"; backing vocals, acoustic piano on "Homeward Through the Haze"
- Stan Szelest — electric piano on "Fieldworker"
- David Lindley — slide guitar on "Mama Lion", "Take the Money and Run", "Naked in the Rain", "Love Work Out", "Low Down Payment" and "Fieldworker"; fiddle on "Take the Money and Run" and "Cowboy of Dreams"
- Danny Kortchmar — electric guitar on "Mama Lion", "Bittersweet", "Take the Money and Run", "Naked in the Rain", "Love Work Out" and "Low Down Payment"
- Joel Bernstein — guitar on "Mama Lion" and "Naked in the Rain"; backing vocals on "Cowboy of Dreams"
- James Taylor — guitar on "Carry Me" and "To the Last Whale..."; backing vocals on "To the Last Whale..."
- Ben Keith — slide guitar on "Fieldworker"
- Tim Drummond — bass on "Mama Lion," "Take the Money and Run", "Naked in the Rain", "Love Work Out", "Cowboy of Dreams" and "Fieldworker"
- Leland Sklar — bass on "Carry Me", "Bittersweet", "Low Down Payment", "Homeward Through the Haze" and "To the Last Whale..."
- Russ Kunkel — drums on all tracks except "Fieldworker"; percussion on "Fieldworker"
- Levon Helm — drums on "Fieldworker"
- Jackson Browne — backing vocals on "Love Work Out"
- Jimmie Haskell — string arrangements on "Wind on the Water"
- Sid Sharp — orchestra leader on "Wind on the Water"

Production personnel

- Crosby & Nash — producers
- Stephen Barncard, Don Gooch — engineers
- Stanley Johnston — assistant engineer
- Gary Burden — art direction
- Joel Bernstein — photography
- Stephen Barncard, Mike Ragonga — reissue producers
- Erick Labson — remastering engineer

== Charts ==
Chart (1975)	Peak position
US Billboard Top LPs	6
Canadian RPM 100 Albums	28
US Cash Box Top 100 Albums	10
US Record World Album Chart	9

Singles

Sales chart performance for singles from Wind On The Water
Year	Single	Chart	Position
1975	"Carry Me"	US Billboard Hot 100	52
1975	"Carry Me"	Canada RPM Singles	65
1975	"Carry Me"	US Top Singles (Cash Box)	44
1975	"Carry Me"	US Top Singles (Record World)	90
1975	"Take The Money And Run"	US Top Singles (Cash Box)	103

== Certification ==
Region	Certification	Certified units/sales
United States (RIAA)	Gold	500,000^{^}
^{^} Shipments figures based on certification alone.

== Tour ==
1975 Acoustic Tour
Date	City	Country	Venue
14 August 1975	Los Angeles, CA	United States	Universal Amphitheatre
15 August 1975	Los Angeles, CA	United States	Universal Amphitheatre
16 August 1975	Los Angeles, CA	United States	Universal Amphitheatre
17 August 1975	Los Angeles, CA	United States	Universal Amphitheatre
26 August 1975	Philadelphia, PA	United States	Tower Theater
27 August 1975	Philadelphia, PA	United States	Tower Theater
29 August 1975	Lenox, MA	United States	Tanglewood Music Center
30 August 1975	Columbia, MD	United States	Merriweather Post Pavilion
1 September 1975	Troy, MI	United States	Pine Knob
2 September 1975	Akron, OH	United States	Blossom Center
3 September 1975	Chicago, IL	United States	Chicago Auditorium Theater
5 September 1975	Holmdel, NJ	United States	Garden State Music Center
7 September 1975	New York City	United States	Beacon Theatre
8 September 1975	New York City	United States	Beacon Theatre
13 October 1975	Berkeley, CA	United States	Greek Theater
14 October 1975	Santa Barbara, CA	United States	County Bowl
1975 Electric Tour
10 October 1975	Williamsburg, VA	United States	College of William & Mary
11 October 1975	Washington	United States	Georgetown University
12 October 1975	Washington	United States	Georgetown University
15 October 1975	Macomb, IL	United States	Western Illinois University
17 October 1975	Champaign, IL	United States	University of Illinois
18 October 1975	Oxford, OH	United States	Ohio University
21 October 1975	Boston, MA	United States	Boston Music Hall
22 October 1975	Springfield, MA	United States	Civic Center
24 October 1975	Lafayette, IN	United States	Purdue University
25 October 1975	Carbondale, IL	United States	Southern Illinois University
28 October 1975	Dallas, TX	United States	Moody College
29 October 1975	Houston, TX	United States	
31 October 1975	Miami, FL	United States	Jai Alai Fronton
1 November 1975	St. Petersburg, FL	United States	
2 November 1975	Gainesville, FL	United States	University of Florida
5 November 1975	Atlanta, GA	United States	
7 November 1975	Erie, PA	United States	
8 November 1975	South Bend, IN	United States	Notre Dame University
9 November 1975	Ypsilanti, MI	United States	Eastern Michigan University
11 November 1975	Pittsburgh, PA	United States	Carnegie-Mellon University
13 November 1975	Bowling Green, OH	United States	Bowling Green State University
14 November 1975	Mt. Pleasant, MI	United States	Central Michigan University
15 November 1975	Kalamazoo, MI	United States	Wings Stadium
21 November 1975	Berkeley, CA	United States	Zellerbach Auditorium
22 November 1975	Berkeley, CA	United States	Zellerbach Auditorium
23 November 1975	Berkeley, CA	United States	Zellerbach Auditorium
24 November 1975	Berkeley, CA	United States	Zellerbach Auditorium
26 November 1975	Anaheim, CA	United States	Anaheim Convention Center
1 December 1975	Tokyo	Japan	Nippon Budokan

13 December 1975 Hawaii, Oahu Waikiki Shell
