= Earth & Sky (album) =

Studio album by Graham Nash
- Released: 15 February 1980
- Studios: Britannia Studios (Los Angeles, California); Sound Labs (Hollywood, California); Devonshire Studios (Burbank, California): Rudy Records and Wally Heider Studios (San Francisco, California)
- Genres: Rock; pop
- Length: 35:24
- Label: Capitol
- Producers: Graham Nash, Stanley Johnston

Graham Nash chronology
Wild Tales (1974)	Earth & Sky (1980)	Innocent Eyes (1986)

Professional ratings
Review scores
Source	Rating
AllMusic	4/5 stars
The Rolling Stone Album Guide	2/5 stars

Earth & Sky is the third solo studio album by British singer-songwriter Graham Nash. It was released in February 1980 on Capitol Records.

== Track listing ==
All songs written by Graham Nash, except where noted.

Side one
No.	Title	Length
1.	"Earth & Sky"	3:35
2.	"Love Has Come"	3:27
3.	"Out on the Island"	4:20
4.	"Skychild"	3:55
5.	"Helicopter Song"	2:47

Side two
No.	Title	Writer(s)	Length
1.	"Barrel of Pain"		5:16
2.	"TV Guide"	Nash, Joe Vitale	1:54
3.	"It's All Right"		3:14
4.	"Magical Child"		3:42
5.	"In the 80's"		3:04

== Personnel ==
- Graham Nash – lead vocals; acoustic guitar (2, 3); rhythm guitar (4, 6); electric guitar (9); electric piano (1); organ (5); harmonica (9); string arrangements (9); string writing (9)

=== Additional personnel ===
- David Lindley – acoustic guitar (10); rhythm guitar (1); lead guitar (4, 6); Hawaiian guitar (3)
- Stephen Stills – rhythm guitar (5)
- Joe Walsh – rhythm guitar (1); lead guitar (1, 5)
- David Crosby – acoustic guitar (3); backing vocals (2, 5)
- Joel Bernstein – acoustic guitar (2, 8), backing vocals (3)
- Steve Lukather – lead guitar (2)
- Danny Kortchmar – acoustic guitar (8, 10); rhythm guitar (2, 5); guitar solo (6)
- John Brennan – rhythm guitar (2)
- Craig Doerge – piano (1, 5, 8–10), electric piano (2, 3, 7, 8), organ (6, 8, 10), string arrangements (5), string writing (9)
- Joe Vitale – piano (7); organ (4); synthesizers (7); drums (1, 5, 6, 10); flute (1); timpani (5); string arrangements (7)
- Tim Drummond – bass guitar (1–4, 6–8, 10), six-string bass guitar (1, 10)
- George Perry – bass guitar (5)
- Russ Kunkel – drums (2–4, 6–8); percussion (1–3)
- Joe Lala – percussion (5)
- Jackson Nash – harmonica (9)
- Cece Bullard – backing vocals (1)
- Jackson Browne – backing vocals (2)
- Armando Hurley – backing vocals (2)
- Nicolette Larson – backing vocals (2)
- Gloria Coleman – backing vocals (3, 4, 6, 8, 10)
- Brenda Eager – backing vocals (3, 4, 6, 8, 10)
- Cleo Kennedy – backing vocals (3, 4, 6, 8, 10)
- Leah Kunkel – backing vocals (5)
- Tim Barr – strings (5, 7)
- Debra Pearson – strings (5)
- Daniel Smith – strings (5, 7)
- Kevan Torfeh – strings (5, 7, 9)
- Deborah Yamak – strings (5, 7)
- Rhonni Hallman – strings (7)
- Jean Hugo – strings (7)
- Peter Kent – strings (7)
- Sid Page – strings (7, 9)
- Debra Price – strings (7)
- Julie Rosenfeld – strings (7)
- Carol Shive – strings (7)
- Vicki Sylvester – strings (7)
- Margaret Wooten – strings (7)
- Ruth Kahn – strings (9)
- Wayne Goodwin – string arrangements (5, 9), orchestration (7), conductor (5, 7), string writing (9), string director (9)
- Glen Rosecrans – music preparation (5, 7, 9)

=== Production personnel ===
- Graham Nash – producer
- Stanley Johnston – producer, engineer
- Howard Albert – engineer
- Ron Albert – engineer
- Steve Gursky – engineer
- Jerry Hudgins – engineer
- Wally Traugott – mastering
- Joel Bernstein – art direction, photography
- Gary Burden – art direction
- Color Service, Inc. – artwork

== Charts ==
Chart (1980)	Peak position
US Billboard Top LPs	117
Canadian RPM 100 Albums	
US Cash Box Top 100 Albums	106
US Record World Album Chart	104
