= Another Stoney Evening =

Live album by Crosby & Nash
- Released: January 13, 1998
- Recorded: October 10, 1971
- Genre: Rock
- Length: 73:28
- Label: Grateful Dead/Arista
- Producer: Stephen Barncard

Crosby & Nash chronology
The Best of Crosby & Nash (1978)	Another Stoney Evening (1998)	The Best of Crosby & Nash: The ABC Years (2002)

Professional ratings
Review scores
Source	Rating
Allmusic	3/5 stars

Another Stoney Evening is the sixth album by the duo of David Crosby and Graham Nash, issued in 1998 on Grateful Dead Records, catalog GDCD 4057. It had been recorded at the Dorothy Chandler Pavilion in Los Angeles, California more than 26 years prior to its release.

== Background ==
After the tour of Crosby, Stills, Nash & Young that ended in July 1970, the quartet broke up amidst some tension. All four members then pursued solo careers, each releasing an album within the next year. Nash and Crosby had developed a symbiotic musical relationship and so decided to undertake a tour as a duo during the autumn of 1971. They opted to go out without any backing band, playing theaters in what would later be termed an "unplugged" format. They were so pleased with the results that they recorded their first duo album in the spring of 1972.

The repertoire for this Crosby and Nash tour consisted of mostly previously released songs, some of which had appeared on Crosby and Nash's respective 1971 solo albums If I Could Only Remember My Name and Songs for Beginners. Four new songs would end up on the 1972 debut Crosby and Nash album: "Southbound Train"; "Where Will I Be?"; "Strangers Room"; and "Immigration Man." The title for the album comes from a bootleg of the period entitled A Very Stoney Evening, from a show on the tour mistakenly attributed to the evening of this recording.

== Track listing ==
No.	Title	Writer(s)	Length
1.	"anticipatory crowd"		0:47
2.	"Déjà Vu"	David Crosby	5:46
3.	"Wooden Ships"	Crosby, Paul Kantner, Stephen Stills	5:56
4.	"Man in the Mirror"	Graham Nash	2:39
5.	"Orleans"	traditional	2:23
6.	"I Used to Be A King"	Nash	4:55
7.	"Traction in the Rain"	Crosby	4:51
8.	"The Lee Shore"	Crosby	4:49
9.	"Southbound Train"	Nash	5:00
10.	"Laughing"	Crosby	4:59
11.	"Triad"	Crosby	6:19
12.	"Where Will I Be?"	Crosby	5:15
13.	"Strangers Room"	Nash	3:49
14.	"Immigration Man"	Nash	4:10
15.	"Guinnevere"	Crosby	6:26
16.	"Teach Your Children"	Nash	4:22
17.	"exit sounds"		1:12

== Personnel ==
- David Crosby — vocal, guitar
- Graham Nash — vocal, guitar, piano

=== Additional personnel ===
- Stephen Barncard — producer
- Bill Halverson — recording engineer
- Steve Silberman — liner notes
