= The Section (band) =

American instrumental rock music group

The Section was a United States instrumental rock/jazz fusion band formed in the early 1970s by guitarist Danny Kortchmar, keyboardist Craig Doerge, bassist Leland Sklar, and drummer Russ Kunkel. Other musicians associated with the group include multi-instrumentalist David Lindley and guitarist Waddy Wachtel. They are best known for both studio and stage work in support of some of the best selling singer-songwriters and solo singers of that decade. Their frequent appearances on the records of artists signed to Asylum Records made them the label's de facto house band. Their close association with the singer-songwriter and soft rock genres of the 1970s also led to their alternate moniker of "The Mellow Mafia".

They appeared together and individually on such albums as Carole King's Tapestry, James Taylor's Sweet Baby James, and many more by Linda Ronstadt, Crosby & Nash, Jackson Browne, Warren Zevon, and other artists. They also performed as the back-up band on many of their tours. Other musicians who did not belong to the discrete 1972–1977 band but frequently performed in other permutations of the ensemble (such as Browne's Running on Empty-era touring band) were Mighty Jitters bassist Tim Drummond and David Lindley. Fork It Over (1977), the group's final album, featured guest appearances from Taylor and David Crosby alongside other session luminaries of the era, including percussionist Joe Lala, saxophonist David Sanborn, trumpeter Chuck Findley and multi-instrumentalist Jim Horn.

One or more of them can be heard on the most popular tracks from the 1970s: King's "It's Too Late" and "Sweet Seasons"; Taylor's "You've Got a Friend" and his remake of "How Sweet It Is (to Be Loved by You)"; Browne's "Doctor, My Eyes" and "Rock Me on the Water"; Ronstadt's "Poor Poor Pitiful Me"; Joni Mitchell's "Carey"; Crosby, Stills & Nash's "Shadow Captain" and "Just a Song Before I Go"; and entire albums by Taylor (JT, Mud Slide Slim and the Blue Horizon), King (Rhymes & Reasons, Thoroughbred), Ronstadt (Don't Cry Now, Mad Love), Crosby & Nash (Graham Nash David Crosby, Wind on the Water) and Browne (Running on Empty, Hold Out).

By the 1980s, the group stopped working together collectively, although as individuals they continued to play prominent roles in the studio and on tour with many of the most popular acts of the decade, including Phil Collins, who collaborated with Sklar frequently starting with 1985's No Jacket Required album and subsequent tour, Crosby, Stills, Nash & Young, whose albums Daylight Again and American Dream feature keyboard work and songwriting by Doerge, Stevie Nicks, whose debut solo album Bella Donna features guitar work from Wachtel, who continues to work with her as her musical director, Bob Seger, who frequently collaborated with Kunkel beginning with 1982's The Distance album following the departure of David Teegarden, and Don Henley, who used Kortchmar's writing skills and musicianship on numerous instruments on his I Can't Stand Still and Building the Perfect Beast albums.

Beside their supporting work for other musicians, The Section released three albums of their own, consisting of mostly instrumental music that was an amalgam of rock, pop, jazz, and jazz fusion.

The Section was inducted into the TEC Awards Hall of Fame in 2018.

In 2018, three members of The Section formed a group called The Immediate Family, consisting of Danny Kortchmar on guitar and vocals, Leland Sklar on bass, and Russ Kunkel on drums and backing vocals. They were joined by Waddy Wachtel and Steve Postell on guitars and vocals. The group has toured Japan and released a number of recordings. Their first U.S. single, "Cruel Twist", was released in 2020. Their first full length U.S. release, the self-titled album The Immediate Family, debuted on August 27, 2021.

== Discography ==
- The Section (1972, Warner Bros) also features a young Michael Brecker and a cover of Otis Redding's "(Sittin' On) The Dock of the Bay".
- Forward Motion (1973, Warner Bros).
- Fork It Over (1977, Capitol), with guests James Taylor and David Crosby.
