= Whistling Down the Wire =

Studio album by Crosby & Nash
- Released: June 25, 1976
- Genre: Rock
- Length: 36:36
- Labels: ABC Records (1976); MCA Records (2000)
- Producers: David Crosby, Graham Nash, Stephen Barncard

Crosby & Nash chronology
Wind on the Water (1975)	Whistling Down the Wire (1976)	Crosby-Nash Live (1977)

Professional ratings
Review scores
Source	Rating
Allmusic	2/5 stars

Whistling Down the Wire is the third album by Crosby & Nash, released on ABC Records in 1976, the second of the duo's three-album deal with ABC Records. Cassette and 8-track tape versions of the album were distributed by Atlantic Records, to which Crosby, Stills, Nash & Young were signed. It peaked at No. 26 on the Billboard 200 album chart and was certified gold by the RIAA. Two singles were released from the album, "Out of the Darkness" and "Spotlight", of which only the first charted on the Billboard Hot 100, peaking at #89.

== Background ==
In the summer and fall of 1975, after the success of Wind on the Water, David Crosby and Graham Nash took the band that played on the album out on tour. In the course of recording sessions for this album, both were invited to add vocals to a project by Stephen Stills and Neil Young that would become that pair's only duo album to date, Long May You Run credited to the Stills-Young Band. What could have been a potential CSNY reunion got torpedoed after Nash and Crosby left Miami to finish the sessions for what would become Whistling Down the Wire, and Young and Stills reacted by removing the duo's vocals and other contributions from the master tapes. Crosby and Nash vowed never to work with either again. They toured again to support this album in 1976, but by the end of the year reunited with Stills for the second CSN trio album, released in 1977. That album successfully reactivated the trio on a more or less permanent basis, and there was not a new Crosby & Nash studio album for another 28 years.

== Content ==
As on their previous two albums, the instrumental backing was provided by the group of session musicians known as the Section, here consisting of keyboardist Craig Doerge, guitarist Danny Kortchmar, and drummer Russell Kunkel, along with multi-instrumentalist David Lindley and bassist Tim Drummond and known as the Mighty Jitters when on tour with the duo. Many tracks for this album, including "Time After Time", "J.B.'s Blues", and "Marguerita" were left over from the sessions for Wind on the Water. The song "Mutiny" is a reference to The Mutiny Hotel in Miami, a noted hotspot in the 1970s.

Both this album and its predecessor exemplify the sub-genre of soft rock prevalent in much of mid-1970s popular music. With two gold albums in a row, the duo's success on records had outstripped that of their former partner Stills, whose only gold album certification among his most recent five albums had been the one in tandem with Young. Yet, when the opportunity arose, the pair agreed to join up with Stills and continue as Crosby, Stills & Nash.

Sessions took place at Rudy Recorders in San Francisco, and the Sound Lab in Los Angeles. Whistling Down the Wire was reissued for compact disc on January 11, 2000, on MCA Records. It was made available again as part of MCA's new manufacture on-demand process.

== Track listing ==
=== Side one ===
No.	Title	Writer(s)	Length
1.	"Spotlight"	Graham Nash, Danny Kortchmar	2:51
2.	"Broken Bird"	David Crosby, Nash	2:44
3.	"Time After Time"	Crosby	2:32
4.	"Dancer" (instrumental)	Crosby	4:50
5.	"Mutiny"	Nash	4:45

=== Side two ===
No.	Title	Writer(s)	Length
1.	"J.B.'s Blues"	Nash	2:41
2.	"Marguerita"	Nash	4:13
3.	"Taken at All"	Crosby, Nash	3:07
4.	"Foolish Man"	Crosby	4:29
5.	"Out of the Darkness"	Crosby, Nash, Craig Doerge	4:24

== Personnel ==
- David Crosby – vocals, acoustic guitar
- Graham Nash – vocals, acoustic guitar, electric guitar, harmonica

Additional personnel

- Craig Doerge – acoustic piano, electric piano, organ, glass harmonica
- David Lindley – electric guitar, slide guitar, pedal steel guitar, viola, violin
- Danny Kortchmar – electric guitar, Dobro
- Laura Allan – zither
- Tim Drummond – bass
- Russ Kunkel – drums, percussion
- Lee Holdridge – string arrangements (4, 10)
- Sid Sharp – orchestra leader (4, 10)

Production personnel

- Crosby & Nash – producers
- Stephen Barncard and Don Gooch – engineers
- Lanky Linstrot – mastering at ABC Recording Studios (Los Angeles, California)
- Gary Burden and Jenice Heo – art direction
- Joel Bernstein – photography
- Stephen Barncard and Mike Ragonga – reissue producers
- Erick Labson – remastering engineer

== Chart ==
Chart (1976)	Peak position
US Billboard Top LPs	26
Canadian RPM 100 Albums	17
Dutch MegaCharts Albums	12
Italian Album Charts	17
US Cash Box Top 100 Albums	23
US Record World Album Chart	23

Sales chart performance for singles from Whistling Down The Wire
Year	Single	Chart	Position
1976	"Out of the Darkness"	US Billboard Hot 100	89
1976	"Out of the Darkness"	US Top Singles (Cash Box)	77
1976	"Out of the Darkness"	US Top Singles (Record World)	117
1976	"Spotlight"	US Billboard Hot 100	109
1976	"Spotlight"	US Top Singles (Record World)	127

== Certification ==
Region	Certification	Certified units/sales
United States (RIAA)	Gold	500,000^{^}
^{^} Shipments figures based on certification alone.

== Tour ==
Date	City	Country	Venue
23 May 1976	Anaheim	United States	Anaheim Convention Center
6 August 1976	Concord	United States	Concord Pavilion
12 August 1976	Los Angeles	United States	Greek Theater
18 August 1976	Illinois	United States	Southern Illinois University
20 August 1976	Troy	United States	Pine Knob
21 August 1976	Troy	United States	Pine Knob
22 August 1976	Akron	United States	Blossom Music Center
24 August 1976	Pittsburgh	United States	Syria Mosque
25 August 1976	Philadelphia	United States	Temple Music
27 August 1976	Holmdel	United States	Garden State Art Center
28 August 1976	Holmdel	United States	Garden State Art Center
3 September 1976	Lenox	United States	Tanglewood Music Center
4 September 1976	Rochester	United States	Community War Memorial
8 September 1976	New York City	United States	Central Park
9 September 1976	New York City	United States	Central Park
10 September 1976	New York City	United States	Central Park
11 September 1976	New York City	United States	Central Park
16 September 1976	Edinburgh	United Kingdom	Edinburgh Playhouse
17 September 1976	Manchester	United Kingdom	Free Trade Hall
22 September 1976	Amsterdam	Netherlands	Jaap Edenhal
23 September 1976	Eppelheim	Germany	Rhein-Neckar-Hall
28 September 1976	London	United Kingdom	Hammersmith Odeon
22 October 1976	Springfield	United States	
26 November 1976	Anaheim	United States	Anaheim Convention Center
1 December 1976	Tokyo	Japan	Budokan
1 December 1976	Tokyo	Japan	Budokan
12 December 1976	Osaka	Japan	Festival Hall
