= Russ Kunkel =

American drummer (born 1948)

- Born: Russell Kunkel; September 27, 1948 (age 78); Pittsburgh, Pennsylvania, U.S.
- Genres: Rock, pop, country, electronic
- Occupations: Musician, session musician, record producer
- Instruments: Drums, percussion
- Years active: 1960s–present
- Formerly of: The Section

Russell Kunkel (born September 27, 1948) is an American drummer who has worked as a session musician with many popular artists, including Jackson Browne, Jimmy Buffett, Harry Chapin, Rita Coolidge, Neil Diamond, Bob Dylan, Cass Elliot, Dan Fogelberg, Glenn Frey, Art Garfunkel, Carole King, Leah Kunkel, Lyle Lovett, Reba McEntire, Joni Mitchell, Stevie Nicks, Nitty Gritty Dirt Band, Linda Ronstadt, Bob Seger, Carly Simon, Stephen Stills, James Taylor, Joe Walsh, Steve Winwood, Bill Withers, Neil Young, and Warren Zevon. He was the studio and touring drummer for Crosby & Nash in the 1970s and played on all four of their studio albums.

== Early life and education ==
Kunkel was born in Pittsburgh and moved to Long Beach, California when he was 9. There, he was part of an orchestra at the local elementary school. Prior to moving, he was influenced by his brother and the song "Wipe Out" to play drums. He played for approximately six different bands, including the Barons, and appeared at many sock hops and high school dances, playing surf music and Beatles songs. In his last two years of high school he was a jazz drummer and later worked for John Stewart and the Kingston Trio.

Kunkel is a 1966 graduate of Long Beach Polytechnic High School in Long Beach.

== Career ==
In 1966, Kunkel moved to Los Angeles. He joined the band Things to Come and during the summer of 1968, they performed, for 19 weeks as the opening band, at the Whisky a Go Go, a club on the Sunset Strip in Hollywood, while under the alcohol drinking age in California.

Kunkel worked for Bob Dylan and together they released a soundtrack to the movie Pat Garrett & Billy the Kid. In 1970 Kunkel helped Bob Dylan and drummer Billy Mundi release an album titled New Morning.

Kunkel was a part of B.B. King's group, playing with pianist Carole King, and meeting Bill Szymczyk, Leon Russell, and Joe Walsh. He recorded "Hummingbird" for King's album Indianola Mississippi Seeds.

Kunkel's first single was a demo with Joel Sill for Trousdale Music, which included musicians Joe Osborn and Larry Knechtel. In early 1970s, while rehearsing for the upcoming tour, he met Chris Darrow, a former player of John Stewart's, who was a friend of Peter Asher.

In 1970, Kunkel through his connection with producer Peter Asher, rehearsed "Fire and Rain" and suggested he use brushes instead of sticks to provide the backing beat to the song. Back in the studio, he asked whether he should use the brushes, to record and Asher said, "do it like we rehearsed". He then helped James Taylor to record the rest of the Sweet Baby James album. Kunkel played on Tony Kosinec's "Bad Girl Songs," which was produced by Peter Asher. In 1971 Kunkel worked with Gerry Goffin, Gary Hart, and Carole King on the Tapestry album, which became a classic. From 1971 to 1972 Kunkel worked with Joni Mitchell on her albums Blue and For the Roses. Along with his bandmates in the Section, he appeared on the first album by Crosby & Nash, and would continue working with the duo through the decade. From 1972 to 1973, he played in the attic of James Taylor's house at Martha's Vineyard where he recorded parts of the One Man Dog album. In 1972 Kunkel helped Willis Alan Ramsey to release the album, Willis Alan Ramsey, which was issued under Shelter Records label.

In 1972, Kunkel with James Taylor and bassist Leland Sklar, guitarist Danny Kortchmar from The Flying Machine, and keyboardist Craig Doerge formed a band called The Section. The group existed between 1972 and 1977, during which time they had recorded three albums. A few years later however, the band got smaller because Sklar preferred to work in the studio, and Doerge had joined another band.

In 1975, Kunkel played on the Carly Simon song "Waterfall" and played a part in James Taylor's album Gorilla in a song "How Sweet It Is (To Be Loved By You)". In 1977 during the recording of Jackson Browne's Running on Empty album, Kunkel played on Pearl and North Drum sets, and went on a tour to promote the album. During the same year, Kunkel played hi-hat on the Crosby, Stills & Nash album CSN. A year later, he worked with Warren Zevon on Excitable Boy as part of the Section.

In 1980, during his tour with Jackson Browne to promote his album Hold Out, he played a tom, a floor tom, a bass drum, a snare drum, and two cymbals. During those years, he also was a drummer for the Lawyers In Love album where he played in a song "Say It Isn't True". On the 1980s album Mad Love by Linda Ronstadt, Kunkel (along with Waddy Wachtel and Danny Kortchmar) performed in the songs "How Do I Make You" and "Mad Love". In 1981, Kunkel joined Stevie Nicks of Fleetwood Mac to create the Bella Donna album, playing on seven out of ten tracks. The same year, Kunkel worked for Bee Gees and performed on three of their songs: "Wildflower", "Cryin' Every Day", and "Be Who You Are", for the album Living Eyes. In 1982, Kunkel, along with Kenny Passarelli, worked with Dan Fogelberg on a song "Tell Me to My Face". In 1983 he helped Jackson Browne and Danny Kortchmar to write a song called "Tender Is the Night" and during that time met with Alan White of Yes. In 1990s he was invited by Joe Walsh to perform the song "I Keep Forgettin'", where he overdubbed with Linn drums.

In 1980, Kunkel played in Linda Ronstadt's band for a concert that was shown on HBO, along with the guitarists Kenny Edwards and Danny Kortchmar, bassist Bob Glaub, keyboardist Bill Payne, pedal steel guitarist Dan Dugmore, and backing vocalist Wendy Waldman. Thirty-nine years later, an album of the concert, Live in Hollywood, was produced by Peter Asher and released in CD and vinyl formats by Rhino Entertainment.

Kunkel had a cameo as doomed drummer Eric "Stumpy Joe" Childs in the 1984 film This Is Spinal Tap. Before the cameo appearance, he practiced it with Judith Owen and her husband Harry Shearer in Hollywood Hills.

In 1991, after his appearance in the 1984 rockumentary, Kunkel joined Spinal Tap for that year's NAMM concert. The same year, he appeared in Bob Seger's The Fire Inside where he played with former E Streeter Roy Bittan.

In 2004, Kunkel reunited with Crosby & Nash for their eponymous album, acting as both drummer and co-producer. In 2010 Kunkel joined the Troubadour Reunion Tour supporting James Taylor and Carole King.

In 2014, Judith Owen, along with her husband and musician Harry Shearer had issued an Ebb & Flow album where Kunkel, Sklar, and Wachtel performed on songs such as Mungo Jerry's "In the Summertime", James Taylor's "Hey Mister", "I've Never Been To Texas", and "I Would Give Anything". Owen invited him to rehearse for the 2016 album of hers called Somebody's Child.

In 2018, Kunkel played on "Small Change", a song written by Harry Shearer. The song featured the Hungarian Studio Orchestra, Judith Owen and Danny Kortchmar and was issued in an album called Smalls Change by Twanky Records/BMG on April 13. He started his own company called Chateau Beach Entertainment in 2019 on which he recorded an album called Rivage.

Kunkel, Kortchmar, Sklar and Wachtel, along with guitarist Steve Postell, reunited to form a new band, The Immediate Family, which released its debut album Honey Don't Leave L.A. in May 2018 from Japanese Vivid Sound label. A live CD Live In Japan 2018 followed in December of that year. The band's U.S. debut single, "Cruel Twist," was released in June 2020. in the first scene.

In 2023, Russ Kunkel was recorded playing the Bongo drums on Playing for Change performance for Doctor My Eyes behind Jackson Browne.

== Equipment ==
Kunkel is a self taught drummer and has a studio at his home, where he plays all kinds of instruments including keyboard, guitar, snare drums, bass drums, various tom drums, and Zildjian and Paiste cymbals. He endorses DW drums, Evans drumheads, and Pro-Mark sticks. He has previously used Gretsch, Sonor, Yamaha, Pearl and Premier drums, as well as Remo drumheads, prior to switching to Evans in 1983. Other than drumming, he is credited with playing tambourine, shaker, cabasa, congas, timbales, castanets, wood block, hi-hats, cardboard box, cowbell, marimba, bongos, bells, timpani, cajon and percussion.

== Personal life ==
In 1968, Kunkel married Leah Kunkel, née Leah Cohen, who was the younger sister of Cass Elliot of The Mamas & The Papas. Their son Nathaniel, now a Grammy and Emmy-winning recording engineer and producer, was born in 1970. When Cass Elliot died in 1974, Russ and Leah Kunkel took in her daughter and raised her. In 1990, Kunkel married singer Nicolette Larson, and that same year their daughter was born. Kunkel and Larson were married until her death in 1997. In 2014 he married Shauna Drayson Hayward.

== Partial discography ==
=== Musician ===
- Herb Alpert – Just You and Me (1976)
- Barbi Benton – Something New (1975)
- Stephen Bishop:
  - Careless (1976)
  - Bish (1978)
  - Red Cab to Manhattan (1980)
- Ronee Blakley – Ronee Blakley (1972)
- Karla Bonoff:
  - Karla Bonoff (1977)
  - Restless Nights (1979)
  - Wild Heart of the Young (1982)
- Terence Boylan:
  - Terence Boylan (1977)
  - Suzy (1980)
- Bread – Retrospective (1996)
- Brewer & Shipley – Brewer & Shipley (1974)
- Sarah Brightman – As I Came of Age (1998)
- Jackson Browne:
  - Jackson Browne (1972)
  - For Everyman (1973)
  - The Pretender (1976)
  - Running on Empty (album) (1977)
  - Lives in the Balance (1986)
  - World in Motion (1989)
- Jimmy Buffett:
  - Volcano (1979)
  - One Particular Harbour (1983)
  - Hot Water (1988)
  - Boats, Beaches, Bars & Ballads (1992)
- J. J. Cale – Shades (1981)
- Eric Carmen – Change of Heart (1978)
- Cecilio & Kapono – Cecilio and Kapono (1988)
- Harry Chapin:
  - Heads & Tales (1972)
  - Sniper and Other Love Songs (1972)
- Beth Nielsen Chapman:
  - Beth Nielsen Chapman (1990)
  - You Hold the Key (1993)
- Tracy Chapman:
  - Crossroads (1989)
  - Collection (2001)
- The Church (band):
  - Starfish (drums (uncredited) on Under the Milky Way) (1988)
- Clannad:
  - Sirius (1987)
  - Past Present (1989)
  - A Magical Gathering: The Clannad Anthology (2002)
- Rita Coolidge:
  - Fall into Spring (1974)
  - Heartbreak Radio (1981)
- Dana Cooper – Dana Cooper (1973)
- Beverley Craven – Love Scenes (1993)
- David Crosby:
  - Oh Yes I Can (1989)
  - Thousand Roads (1993)
- Crosby & Nash:
  - Graham Nash David Crosby (1972)
  - Wind on the Water (1975)
  - Whistling Down the Wire (1976)
  - Crosby-Nash Live (1977)
  - Crosby & Nash (2004)
- Crosby, Stills & Nash:
  - Daylight Again (1982)
- Crosby, Stills, Nash & Young:
  - CSNY 1974 (2014)
- Rodney Crowell – Diamonds & Dirt (1989)
- Aselin Debison – Sweet Is the Melody (2002)
- Jackie DeShannon – To Be Free (1970)
- Neil Diamond:
  - Beautiful Noise (1976)
  - Christmas Album (1992)
  - Up on the Roof: Songs from the Brill Building (1993)
  - In My Lifetime (1996)
  - Classics: The Early Years/Jazz Singer/Beautiful Noise (1997)
  - Three Chord Opera (2001)
- Denny Doherty – Watcha' Gonna Do? (1971)
- Bob Dylan:
  - Dylan (1973)
  - Pat Garrett & Billy the Kid (1973)
  - Masterpieces (1978)
- Yvonne Elliman – Night Flight (1978)
- England Dan & John Ford Coley – Fables (1971)
- The Everly Brothers – Stories We Could Tell (1972)
- Don Felder – Airborne (1983)
- Dan Fogelberg:
  - Souvenirs (1974)
  - Captured Angel (1975)
  - Nether Lands (1977)
  - Phoenix (1979)
  - The Innocent Age (1981)
  - Windows and Walls (1984)
  - High Country Snows (1985)
  - Exiles (1987)
  - The Wild Places (1990)
  - River of Souls (1993)
- Glenn Frey – Soul Searchin' (1988)
- Richie Furay – I Still Have Dreams (1979)
- Art Garfunkel:
  - Breakaway (1975)
  - Scissors Cut (1981)
  - Songs from a Parent to a Child (1997)
- David Gates:
  - First (1973)
  - Goodbye Girl (1978)
  - Falling in Love Again (1980)
- Debbie Gibson – Think With Your Heart (1995)
- Louise Goffin – Kid Blue (1979)
- Andrew Gold:
  - What's Wrong With This Picture (1976)
  - All This and Heaven Too (1978)
- Jimmy Griffin – Breakin' Up Is Easy (1973)
- Nanci Griffith – Lone Star State of Mind (1987)
- Arlo Guthrie:
  - Amigo (1976)
  - Power of Love (1982)
- Emmylou Harris:
  - The Ballad of Sally Rose (1985)
  - Portraits (1996)
- Don Henley – I Can't Stand Still (1982)
- Bill Hughes – Dream Master (1979)
- Brian Hyland – Brian Hyland (1970)
- Elton John and Tim Rice – Aida (1999)
- Tom Jones – Lead and How to Swing It (1994)
- Casey Kelly – Casey Kelly (1972)
- B.B. King:
  - Best of B.B. King (1973)
  - King of the Blues (1992)
  - Greatest Hits (1998)
  - Anthology (2000)
  - 80 (2005)
  - Ultimate Collection (2005)
- Carole King:
  - Music (1971)
  - Tapestry (1971)
  - Thoroughbred (1976)
  - Speeding Time (1983)
  - Love Makes the World (2001)
- Tony Kosinec – Bad Girl Songs (1970)
- Leah Kunkel – Leah Kunkel (1979)
- Lyle Lovett:
  - Joshua Judges Ruth (1992)
  - I Love Everybody (1994)
  - The Road to Ensenada (1996)
  - Step Inside This House (1998)
  - My Baby Don't Tolerate (2003)
  - Smile (2003)
  - It's Not Big It's Large (2007)
- Dave Mason and Cass Elliot - Dave Mason & Cass Elliot (1971)
- Kate Markowitz – Map of the World (2003)
- Richard Marx – Paid Vacation (1994)
- Reba McEntire:
  - Last One to Know (1987)
  - Reba (1988)
  - Sweet Sixteen (1989)
- Kate & Anna McGarrigle – Kate & Anna McGarrigle (1975)
- Pat McGee - Pat McGee (2015)
- Roger McGuinn:
  - Peace on You (1974)
  - Born to Rock and Roll (1992)
  - Roger McGuinn/Peace on You (2004)
- Bette Midler – Broken Blossom (1977)
- Joni Mitchell:
  - Blue (1971)
  - For the Roses (1972)
- Maria Muldaur – Sweet Harmony/Open Your Eyes (2003)
- Anne Murray – Anne Murray (1996)
- Graham Nash:
  - Earth & Sky (1980)
  - Songs for Survivors (2002)
- Aaron Neville:
  - Warm Your Heart (1991)
  - Ultimate Collection (2001)
- Stevie Nicks:
  - Bella Donna (album) (1981)
  - The Wild Heart (1983)
  - Rock a Little (1985)
- The Nitty Gritty Dirt Band:
  - Uncle Charlie & His Dog Teddy (1970)
  - Stars & Stripes Forever (1974)
  - Dirt, Silver and Gold (1976)
- Dolly Parton – Heartbreak Express (1982)
- Shawn Phillips:
  - Bright White (1973)
  - Spaced (1977)
- Bonnie Raitt – Nine Lives (1986)
- Willis Alan Ramsey – Willis Alan Ramsey (1972)
- Helen Reddy – Helen Reddy (1971)
- Linda Ronstadt:
  - Don't Cry Now (1973)
  - Heart Like a Wheel (1974)
  - Prisoner in Disguise (1975)
  - Hasten Down the Wind (1976)
  - Living in the U.S.A. (1978)
  - Mad Love (1980)
  - Get Closer (1982)
  - Cry Like a Rainstorm, Howl Like the Wind (1989)
  - Winter Light (1994)
  - Feels Like Home (1995)
  - We Ran (1998)
  - Mi Jardin Azul: Las Canciones Favoritas (2004)
- Diana Ross – Force Behind the Power (1991)
- Jennifer Rush – Heart Over Mind (1987)
- Shawna Russell - Goddess (2007)
- Carole Bayer Sager:
  - Carole Bayer Sager (1977)
  - Too (1978)
- Sanne Salomonsen:
  - Where Blue Begins (1991)
  - Sannes Bästa, Vol. 2 (2000)
- Leo Sayer – Leo Sayer (1978)
- Seals and Crofts:
  - Summer Breeze (1972)
  - Year of Sunday (1972)
- Neil Sedaka:
  - Sedaka's Back (1975)
  - Steppin' Out (1976)
  - In the Pocket (1980)
- Bob Seger & the Silver Bullet Band:
  - The Distance (1982)
  - Like a Rock (1986)
  - The Fire Inside (1991)
  - It's a Mystery (1995)
  - Greatest Hits 2 (2003)
- Feargal Sharkey – Wish (1988)
- Carly Simon:
  - Hotcakes (1974)
  - Playing Possum (1975)
  - Spoiled Girl (1985)
  - Coming Around Again (1987)
  - This Is My Life (1992)
  - Anthology (2002)
  - Reflections: Carly Simon's Greatest Hits (2004)
- JD Souther – Black Rose (1976)
- Jimmie Spheeris – Original Tap Dancing Kid (1973)
- Rick Springfield – Mission Magic (1974)
- Stealin Horses – Stealin Horses (1985)
- Al Stewart:
  - 24 Carrots (1980)
  - Just Yesterday (2005)
- John Stewart:
  - Willard (1970)
  - The Lonesome Picker Rides Again (1971)
  - Sunstorm (1971)
  - Wingless Angels (1975)
  - Bombs Away Dream Babies (1979)
  - Dream Babies Go Hollywood (1980)
- Stephen Stills:
  - Live (1975)
  - Stills (1975)
  - Turnin' Back the Pages (2003)
  - Man Alive (2005)
- Barbra Streisand – Emotion (1984)
- Talbot Bros.– Talbot Bros. (1974)
- Mariya Takeuchi – UNIVERSITY STREET (1979)
- James Taylor:
  - Sweet Baby James (1970)
  - Mud Slide Slim and the Blue Horizon (1971)
  - One Man Dog (1972)
  - Gorilla (1975)
  - Greatest Hits (1976)
  - In the Pocket (1976)
  - JT (1977)
  - Flag (1979)
- Kate Taylor – Sister Kate (1971)
- Livingston Taylor – Man's Best Friend (1980)
- Uncle Kracker:
  - No Stranger to Shame (2002)
  - Seventy Two and Sunny (2004)
- Anna Vissi – Everything I Am (2001)
- Joe Walsh:
  - So What (1975)
  - There Goes the Neighborhood (1981)
- Wendy Waldman – Love Has Got Me (1973)
- Jamie Walters:
  - Jamie Walters (1994)
  - Ride (1997)
- Jennifer Warnes – Jennifer Warnes (1977)
- Was (Not Was) – What Up, Dog? (1988)
- Jimmy Webb – Suspending Disbelief (1993)
- Paul Williams:
  - Life Goes On (1972)
  - Just an Old Fashioned Love Song (1971)
- Carnie and Wendy Wilson – Hey Santa! (1993)
- Wilson Phillips – California (2004)
- Steve Winwood – Refugees of the Heart (1990)
- Bill Withers:
  - Menagerie (1977)
  - 'Bout Love (1979)
- Neil Young – Comes a Time (1978)
- Neil Young & Crazy Horse – Zuma (1975)
- Warren Zevon:
  - Excitable Boy (1978)
  - The Envoy (1982)
  - I'll Sleep When I'm Dead (An Anthology) (1996)
  - Genius: The Best of Warren Zevon (2002)

=== Soundtracks ===
- Arachnophobia (1990)
- Catwalk (1994)
- Certain Fury (1985)
- Clockstoppers (2002)
- Coast to Coast (1977)
- Dr. T & the Women (2000)
- Moment by Moment (1978)
- Roadhouse (1989)
- Straight Talk (1992)
- Warriors (1979)
- RV (2006)

=== Producer ===
- Jimmy Buffett:
  - Fruitcakes (1994)
  - Barometer Soup (1995)
  - Banana Wind (1996)
  - Christmas Island (1996)
  - Beach House on the Moon (1999)
  - Meet Me In Margaritaville: The Ultimate Collection (2003)
- Clannad:
  - Rogha: The Best of Clannad (1997)
  - Ultimate Collection (1997)
  - Greatest Hits (2000)
  - Best of Clannad: In a Lifetime (2004)
- The Derek Trucks Band —Joyful Noise (2002)
- Dan Fogelberg - Love Songs (1995)
- Aaron Neville - 20th Century Masters - The Millennium Collection: The (2002)
- Carly Simon:
  - Clouds In My Coffee (1995)
  - The Very Best of Carly Simon: Nobody Does It Better (1998)
  - "Coming Around Again" (1987)
  - "Spoiled Girl" (1985)
- Jane Wiedlin:
  - Jane Wiedlin (1985)
  - Very Best of Jane Wiedlin (1993)

=== Other ===
- Nicolette Larson - Very Best of Nicolette Larson (1999) (Liner notes)
