= Innocent Eyes (Graham Nash album) =

1986 studio album by Graham Nash

Studio album by Graham Nash
- Released: 27 March 1986
- Studios: Rudy Records (Los Angeles, California); Devonshire Studios (Burbank, California); Smoketree Ranch (Chatsworth, California); Long View Farm Studios (North Brookfield, Massachusetts); Sea-West Studios (Honolulu, Oahu, Hawaii).
- Genres: Rock, reggae
- Length: 34:10
- Label: Atlantic
- Producers: Craig Doerge, Stanley Johnston, and Graham Nash

Graham Nash chronology
Earth & Sky (1980)	Innocent Eyes (1986)	Songs for Survivors (2002)

Professional ratings
Review scores
Source	Rating
AllMusic	2.5/5 stars

Innocent Eyes is the fourth solo studio album by British singer-songwriter Graham Nash, released in 1986. The influence of reggae shows in the hit song "Chippin' Away".

The album reached No. 136 on the Billboard charts while title's track single was #84 on Billboard's Hot 100.

== Track listing ==
Side one
No.	Title	Writer(s)	Length
1.	"See You in Prague"	Davitt Sigerson, Richie Zito	3:44
2.	"Keep Away from Me"	Graham Nash	3:34
3.	"Innocent Eyes"	Paul Bliss	3:10
4.	"Chippin' Away"	Tom Fedora	3:55
5.	"Over the Wall"	Nash	3:27

Side two
No.	Title	Writer(s)	Length
6.	"Don't Listen to the Rumours"	John Palermo	3:05
7.	"Sad Eyes"	Nash	3:22
8.	"Newday"	Craig Doerge, Nash	3:19
9.	"Glass and Steel"	Nash	3:17
10.	"I Got a Rock"	Nash	3:17

== Charts ==
Chart (1986)	Peak position
Australia (Kent Music Report)	91
United States (Billboard 200)	136
United States (Cash Box Album)	123

== Personnel ==
- Graham Nash – vocals, rhythm guitar (2), keyboards (5, 7, 10), guitars (9)
- Craig Doerge – keyboards
- Bill Boydston – keyboards (1, 4, 6), LinnDrum programming (1, 2, 4–8, 10)
- Paul Bliss – keyboards (3), bass (3), drum programming (3)
- Alan Pasqua – keyboards (10)
- Michael Landau – guitars (1, 3, 5–10)
- David Lindley – lead guitar (2)
- Jeff Southworth – guitars (4, 6)
- Waddy Wachtel – guitars (5)
- George "Chocolate" Perry – bass guitar (2, 4, 7, 8)
- Tim Drummond – bass guitar (2, 7)
- Leland Sklar – bass guitar (9)
- Mark Williams – drum overdubs (1, 2, 5, 6, 10), drums (3)
- Ian Wallace – drum overdubs (4, 8)
- David Plantshon – drums (9)
- Michael Fisher – percussion (1, 4, 6, 7, 9, 10)
- Joe Lala – percussion (7)
- Kenny Loggins – additional vocals (3)
- Kate Yester – additional vocals (6)
- James Taylor – additional vocals (7)
- Stanley Johnston – engineer
- Jay Parti – engineer
- Greg Ladanyi – mixing at The Complex (Los Angeles, California)
- Doug Sax and Mike Reese – LP mastering at The Mastering Lab (Hollywood, California)
- Barry Diament – CD mastering at Atlantic Studios (New York City, New York)
- Reed Fenton – photography
- Dawn Patrol and Jimmy Wachtel – art direction, design
