= Oh Yes I Can =

Studio album by David Crosby
- Released: January 23, 1989
- Recorded: June–October 1988
- Studios: Devonshire (North Hollywood); A&M (Hollywood); Criteria (Miami); Cherokee (Los Angeles)
- Genre: Rock
- Length: 42:35
- Label: A&M
- Producers: David Crosby; Craig Doerge; Stanley Johnson

David Crosby chronology
If I Could Only Remember My Name (1971)	Oh Yes I Can (1989)	Thousand Roads (1993)

Professional ratings
Review scores
Source	Rating
AllMusic	3.5/5 stars
Rolling Stone	2/5 stars

Oh Yes I Can is the second solo studio album by David Crosby. It was released on January 23, 1989, 18 years on from his previous solo release, If I Could Only Remember My Name.

Four songs ("Drive My Car", "Distances", "Melody" and "Flying Man") had been slated to appear on Crosby's unfinished 1979-1981 Capitol Records solo album and were subsequently rejected for inclusion in Crosby, Stills & Nash projects. The group had attempted to record "Drive My Car" and "Distances" during aborted 1978 sessions for a follow-up to CSN (1977). One of the recordings from this time, "Drive My Car," was included in the trio's 1991 box set, CSN.

== Background ==
The album features a stellar lineup comparable to that of his debut album, including James Taylor (vocals), Jackson Browne (vocals), Bonnie Raitt (guitar), Larry Carlton (guitar), David Lindley (guitar), and Michael Hedges (guitar). Despite the significant changes in pop and rock styles over the 18 years separating the two albums, they demonstrate that a genuine mastery of sound had remained unchanged.

Although Crosby was known for rebellious rock songs such as "Almost Cut My Hair" and "Long Time Gone", his true growth as a songwriter and arranger is evident in complex melodies such as "Flying Man", which features wordless, jazz-influenced scat singing, and the intricate "Distances". The latter immediately recalls the minor-key chord changes of the informal jam song "Kids and Dogs", which Crosby had previously worked on with Jerry Garcia.

The introspective "Tracks in the Dust" and the title track "Oh Yes I Can" also demonstrate the cathartic, healing quality that runs throughout Crosby's work. Evidence of this can be found in the broad range of songs spanning from "Guinnevere" and "Traction in the Rain" to "Thousand Roads". The intense struggle between "good and evil" in the bluesy "Drop Down Mama" and "Monkey and the Underdog" is clearly significant, but placed alongside the more emotional songs, it can feel somewhat restrained.

== Track listing ==
All songs written by David Crosby, except where noted.

No.	Title	Writer(s)	Length
1.	"Drive My Car"		3:34
2.	"Melody"	Crosby, Craig Doerge	4:07
3.	"Monkey and the Underdog"	Crosby, Doerge	4:15
4.	"In the Wide Ruin"	Doerge, Henske	4:47
5.	"Tracks in the Dust"		4:48
6.	"Drop Down Mama"		3:07
7.	"Lady of the Harbor"	Crosby, Doerge	3:19
8.	"Distances"		3:36
9.	"Flying Man"	Crosby, Doerge	3:25
10.	"Oh Yes I Can"		5:08
11.	"America (My Country 'Tis of Thee)"	Traditional, arranged by Michael Hedges	1:58

== Personnel ==
Musicians

- David Crosby – vocals, guitars (5, 6), acoustic guitar (8)
- Craig Doerge – synthesizers (1), Yamaha TX816 Rhodes (2), acoustic piano (3, 4, 6, 10), Rhodes electric piano (4), keyboards (7, 9)
- Kim Bullard – synthesizers (2, 4, 10)
- Mike Finnigan – additional organ (3), organ (6)
- Kenny Kirkland – electric piano (8)
- Graham Nash – electric piano (8)
- Danny Kortchmar – guitars (1, 3), electric guitar (8)
- David Lindley – slide guitar (1)
- Steve Lukather – guitars (2, 4)
- Michael Hedges – guitars (5, 11), guitar arrangements (11)
- Dan Dugmore – slide guitar (6)
- Michael Landau – guitars (7)
- Larry Carlton – guitars (9)
- Leland Sklar – bass guitar (1, 2, 4, 7, 9–11)
- George "Chocolate" Perry – bass guitar (3, 8)
- Tim Drummond – bass guitar (6)
- Joe Vitale – drums (1, 3, 8), organ (3), synthesizers (10)
- Russ Kunkel – drums (2, 4, 7, 9, 10), percussion (7)
- Jim Keltner – drums (6)
- Joe Lala – percussion (2, 8, 9)
- Kim Hutchcroft – saxophones (3)
- Larry Williams – saxophones (3)
- Gary Grant – trumpet (3)
- Jerry Hey – trumpet (3), horn arrangements (3)

Vocalists

- Jackson Browne – additional vocals (4)
- Michael Hedges – additional vocals (5)
- Graham Nash – additional vocals (5, 11)
- Bonnie Raitt – additional backing vocals (7)
- James Taylor – additional vocals (10)
- JD Souther – additional vocals (11)

== Production ==
- David Crosby – producer
- Craig Doerge – producer (1–7, 9–11)
- Stanley Johnston – producer (1–7, 9–11)
- Howard Alpert – producer (8)
- Ron Alpert – producer (8)
- Caroline Balog – art production, design
- Gary Burden – art direction, design
- Henry Diltz – back cover photography
- Jay Parti – front cover photography
- Aaron Rapoport – inner sleeve photography

Technical credits

- Bob Ludwig – mastering at Masterdisk (New York City, New York)
- Mike Reese – mastering at A&M Mastering Studios (Hollywood, California)
- Niko Bolas – mixing (1)
- Stanley Johnston – recording (1–7, 9–11), mixing (2–11)
- Steve Gursky – recording (8)
- Stephen Barncard – additional recording
- Gerry Lentz – additional recording
- Jay Parti – additional recording
- Tom Banghart – additional recording assistant
- Gary Boatner – additional recording assistant
- Michael Bosley – additional recording assistant
- Troy Cruze – additional recording assistant
- Larry Goodwin – additional recording assistant
- Scott Gordon – additional recording assistant
- Mark McKenna – additional recording assistant
- Russell Schmidt – additional recording assistant
- Allan Tucker – additional recording assistant
- Bob Vogt – additional recording assistant
- Paul Winger – additional recording assistant
- Bill Dooley – digital editing
- Dave Collins – digital editing

== Charts ==
Album - Billboard (United States)

Year	Chart	Position
1989	The Billboard 200	104

Singles - Billboard (United States)

Year	Single	Chart	Position
1989	"Drive My Car"	Mainstream Rock Tracks	3
