= Wild Tales (album) =

Studio album by Graham Nash
- Released: 2 January 1974
- Recorded: Rudy Records, San Francisco, California
- Genres: Folk rock, country rock, rock
- Length: 31:16
- Label: Atlantic
- Producer: Graham Nash

Graham Nash chronology
Songs for Beginners (1971)	Wild Tales (1974)	Earth & Sky (1980)

Professional ratings
Review scores
Source	Rating
AllMusic	2.5/5 stars
Christgau's Record Guide	C−
Galeria Musical	4/5 stars
Rolling Stone	(not rated)

Wild Tales is the second solo studio album by British singer-songwriter Graham Nash, released on Atlantic Records in 1974. In the United States, it peaked at number 34 on Billboard's albums chart. Nash blamed its failure to chart higher there on a lack of support and promotion from Atlantic Records. Following the protracted break-up of Crosby, Stills, Nash & Young in late 1974 and early 1975, Nash left the label and signed a contract with ABC Records as a duo with his CSNY partner David Crosby.

Contrary to later reports, the darker tone of Wild Tales was not inspired by the murder of Nash's then-girlfriend, Amy Gossage, by her brother – an event that occurred in February 1975. Rather, Nash was in a sombre mood in the wake of the failures of his earlier relationships with Joni Mitchell and Rita Coolidge, and the unwillingness at the time of the other members of Crosby, Stills, Nash & Young to reunite for a new album.

== Track listing ==
All tracks are written by Graham Nash.

Side one
No.	Title	Length
1.	"Wild Tales"	2:18
2.	"Hey You (Looking At The Moon)"	2:14
3.	"Prison Song"	3:10
4.	"You'll Never Be The Same"	2:48
5.	"And So It Goes"	4:48

Side two
No.	Title	Length
6.	"Grave Concern"	2:45
7.	"Oh! Camil (The Winter Soldier)"	2:51
8.	"I Miss You"	3:04
9.	"On The Line"	2:35
10.	"Another Sleep Song"	4:43

== Personnel ==
- Graham Nash – vocals; acoustic guitar on "You'll Never Be the Same" and "Oh! Camil (The Winter Soldier)"; electric guitar on "Wild Tales", "Hey You (Looking at the Moon)", "And So it Goes" and "Grave Concern"; piano on "I Miss You" and "On the Line"; electric piano on "Prison Song" and "Another Sleep Song"; harmonica on "Hey You (Looking at the Moon)", "Prison Song", "Oh! Camil (The Winder Soldier)" and "On the Line"

Additional Personnel

- David Lindley – slide guitar on "Wild Tales" and "Grave Concern"; mandolin on "Prison Song"
- Dave Mason – twelve-string guitar on "Oh! Camil (The Winter Soldier)"
- Joel Bernstein – acoustic guitar on "Hey You (Looking at the Moon)" and "Another Sleep Song"
- Stephen Stills (credited as "Harry Halex") – acoustic guitar on "On the Line"; electric piano on "And So it Goes"
- Ben Keith – pedal steel guitar on "Hey You (Looking at the Moon)", "You'll Never Be the Same", "And So it Goes" and "On the Line"; dobro on "Another Sleep Song"
- Neil Young (credited as "Joe Yankee") – piano on "And So it Goes"
- Tim Drummond – bass guitar
- John Barbata – drums all tracks except "Oh! Camil (The Winter Soldier)" and "I Miss You"
- David Crosby – backing vocals on "Prison Song", "And So it Goes" and "On the Line"
- Joni Mitchell – backing vocals on "Another Sleep Song"
- Stanley Johnston – voice montage on "Grave Concern"

== Charts ==
Chart (1974)	Peak position
US Billboard Top LPs & Tape	34
Canadian RPM 100 Albums	62
US Cash Box Top 100 Albums	22
US Record World Album Chart	24
