= Craig Doerge =

American musician

- Born: December 4, 1944 (age 81); Cleveland, Ohio, U.S.
- Genre: Rock
- Occupations: Musician; songwriter
- Instrument: Keyboards
- Formerly of: Judy Henske; Crosby, Stills and Nash; James Taylor; Jackson Browne

Craig Doerge (/ˈdɜːrɡi/; born December 4, 1944) is an American keyboard player, session musician, songwriter, and record producer, best known for his keyboard work with Crosby, Stills & Nash, James Taylor, and Jackson Browne.

== Biography ==
He was born in Cleveland, Ohio, United States. Doerge (rhymes with Fergie) had an R&B band through college at Hartford, Connecticut, and then moved to Laurel Canyon, Los Angeles in the late-1960s to work as a studio player and songwriter with A&M Records, and with Jim Keltner, Larry Carlton, and others playing on early Kenny Rogers First Edition tracks, The Challengers, and cartoon shows, ("Groovy Goolies" and "Fat Albert"). After appearing on the Frank Zappa production, The GTOs' album Permanent Damage, he teamed up with Judy Henske, Jerry Yester and Jon Sieter, in the band Rosebud, marrying Henske in 1973.

From the early 1970s he appeared on many sessions. Initially these included albums by Lee Hazlewood and Linda Ronstadt, and he also recorded a solo album for Columbia Records in 1973. Aside from a principal role as keyboardist in the recordings of Crosby, Stills and Nash, James Taylor, and Jackson Browne, he has played on albums by Gene Clark, Carly Simon, The Temptations, Shawn Phillips, Donovan, Mimi Farina and Tom Jans, Willie Nelson, Barbra Streisand, Johnny Hallyday, to name a few.

He was a founding member of The Section, a session supergroup, with Danny Kortchmar, Leland Sklar and Russ Kunkel, which recorded three mostly instrumental LPs in the early to mid-1970s. This band continued through the 1980s in recordings and as a touring back-up band for Crosby, Stills and Nash, James Taylor and Jackson Browne.

Doerge has also collaborated as a songwriter with Jackson Browne, David Crosby, Graham Nash, Paul Williams and others, and has worked on movie soundtracks. He won a Grammy Award for his participation as co-writer with Paul Williams and their song, "Life Goes On", sung in Lena Horne's Tony Award winning Broadway show, Lena. He was nominated for another Grammy in the blues category for the song, "World in Motion", co-written with Jackson Browne, and performed by Pops Staples. In recent years he has written the music for, and produced, two albums for his wife and lyricist, Judy Henske.

"Yellow Beach Umbrella," the lead track on Doerge's 1973 eponymous debut album, co-written with Henske, was recorded in 1976 by Three Dog Night on their American Pastime LP, by Andy Williams on his Andy LP, and by Bette Midler on her 1977 Broken Blossom LP, as well as by Libby Titus and Perry Como.

== Partial discography ==
=== As an artist ===
- Rosebud, Reprise Records RS-6426
- Craig Doerge, Columbia A1-32179
- The Section, Warner Brothers BS-2662
- Forward Motion, The Section, Warner Bros. BS-2714
- Fork It Over, The Section, Capitol ST-11656

=== As a sideman ===
==== With James Taylor ====
- One Man Dog, Warner Brothers BS-2660
- Greatest Hits, Warner Bros BSK-3113
- In the Pocket, Warner Bros BS-2912

==== With Jackson Browne ====
- Jackson Browne, Asylum SD-5051
- For Everyman, Asylum SD-5067-A
- The Pretender, Asylum 7E-1079-A
- Running on Empty, Asylum 6E-113-A-SP
- Hold Out, Asylum 5E-511-A
- Lawyers in Love, Asylum EA-60268-A
- Lives in the Balance, Asylum EA-60457
- World in Motion, Asylum

==== With Crosby & Nash ====
- Graham Nash David Crosby (The "Black album"), Atlantic SD-7220
- Wind on the Water, ABC Records ABCD-902
- Whistling Down the Wire, ABC Records ABCD-956
- Crosby & Nash Live, ABC Records ABCD-1042
- The Best of Crosby & Nash, ABC Records AA-1102

==== With Crosby, Stills & Nash ====
- CSN, Atlantic SD-19104
- Daylight Again, Atlantic SD-19360
- Allies, Atlantic 88075-1
- Live It Up, Atlantic Records 82107-1
- After the Storm, Atlantic Records 82654-2

==== With Crosby, Stills, Nash & Young ====
- American Dream, Atlantic 81888-2

==== With other artists (partial list) ====
- Phoebe Snow, Rock Away, Atlantic WTG-19197
- Phantom of Paradise soundtrack, A&M SP-3653
- No Nukes, The Muse concerts-New York, Asylum ML-801-B
- Linda Ronstadt, Don't Cry Now, Asylum SD-5064
- Frank Zappa and The GTOs, Permanent Damage, Straight Records S-1059]
- Patti Dahlstrom, The Way I Am, 20th Century T-421
- Craig Fuller & Eric Kaz, Columbia AL-35324

==== As record producer ====
- Rich Kids, soundtrack and eight songs with Allan F. Nicholls for the Robert Altman movie production
- Graham Nash, Innocent Eyes, co-produced with Graham Nash and Stanley Johnston, Atlantic 816331
- CSN, Daylight Again, co-production on two cuts: "Delta", and "Might as Well Have A Good Time"
- "Step by Step", co-producer with JD Souther. JD Souther & Karla Bonoff from the movie, About Last Night
- David Crosby, Oh Yes I Can, co producer with Stanley Johnston and David Crosby
- Judy Henske, producer, Loose in the World, Fair Star 8323
- Judy Henske, producer, She Sang California, Fair Star 8393
- Judy Henske, production (10 songs) co-produced box set with Cheryl Pawelski, Big Judy: How Far This Music Goes 1962-2004, Rhino Handmade 7726
