= Immigration Man =

Single by Crosby & Nash

from the album Graham Nash David Crosby
- B-side: "Whole Cloth"
- Released: March 1972
- Genre: Rock
- Length: 3:02
- Label: Atlantic Records
- Songwriter(s): Graham Nash
- Producer(s): David Crosby, Graham Nash, Bill Halverson

Crosby & Nash singles chronology
"Immigration Man"	"Southbound Train"

"Immigration Man" is a song written by Graham Nash and recorded by David Crosby and Graham Nash, released as a single in March 1972. It was the lead single for the duo's debut album, Graham Nash David Crosby. It peaked at No. 36 on the Billboard Hot 100, and is their only Top 40 hit as a duo.

== Background ==
Nash wrote "Immigration Man" about an unfortunate moment he had with a U.S. Customs official when he tried to enter the country. The customs official held him up interminably, and soon people started coming up to Nash for his autograph. When that happened, Nash was allowed to go through, but he remained angry with the treatment he received.

"I'm not against local colour," Nash explained in discussing the song, "but why should you fight me just because you speak differently than I do?" Nash also explained why he chose a picture of the earth from space for the cover of the sheet music for "Immigration Man." "When you look at a photograph of the earth you don't see any borders. That realisation is where our hope as a planet lies." Nash himself became a naturalized U.S. citizen in 1978.

Record World said that "there's a message in this lyric, but the overall sound will be more important" and that the "harmonies stand out."

== Music and lyrics ==
The music of "Immigration Man" is mid-tempo West Coast rock in the Crosby, Stills and Nash or Buffalo Springfield tradition. The guitar solo is by Dave Mason.

The first verse of "Immigration Man" refers to Nash going through customs and getting stopped by the "immigration man", who tells Nash that he's not sure if he can let him in. The second verse tells how Nash was given trouble over various documents, and the third finds him filling out a form that Nash humorously describes to be as big as a blanket. Crosby joins Nash on the next line, offering a warning to would-be global travelers: "So go where you will / As long as you think you can / You better watch out, watch out for the man / Anywhere you're going." The choruses, with harmonies from Crosby and Nash, are pleas for the immigration official to let Nash into the country, with a slight rewording at the end in which the immigration man is referred to as an "irritation man."

== Personnel ==
- David Crosby — vocals, electric guitar
- Graham Nash — vocals, piano
- Dave Mason — electric guitar
- Greg Reeves — bass
- Johnny Barbata — drums

=== Production personnel ===
- Crosby & Nash, Bill Halverson — producers
- Bill Halverson, Doc Storch — engineers
- David Geffen, Elliot Roberts — direction
