= Carry On (Stephen Stills album) =

Box set by Stephen Stills
- Released: February 12, 2013
- Genre: Rock
- Labels: Atlantic Records, Rhino Records, Warner Music Group
- Producers: Joel Bernstein and Graham Nash with Stephen Stills

Stephen Stills chronology
Live At Shepherd's Bush (2009)	Carry On (2013)	Can't Get Enough (2013)

Professional ratings
Review scores
Source	Rating
AllMusic	4.5/5 stars

Carry On is a 4-CD career retrospective box set by Stephen Stills (not to be confused with the CSN compilation released in 1991). It features highlights from his career as a solo artist and with groups including The Au Go Go Singers, Buffalo Springfield, Manassas, and various permutations of CSN&Y. The tracks are arranged in general chronological order of release. The album also includes previously unreleased material.

The album was compiled by Graham Nash, who also compiled box sets for himself and for David Crosby.

== Track listing ==
All songs written by Stephen Stills except where noted.

Disc one

1. "Travelin'" (mono) — Stephen Stills
  - Recorded at a Voice of America radio relay station, San Jose, Costa Rica, 1962. Previously unreleased.
2. "High Flyin' Bird" (Billy Edd Wheeler) — The Au Go Go Singers
  - From the album They Call Us The Au Go Go Singers, 1964
3. "Sit Down, I Think I Love You" (mono) — Buffalo Springfield
  - From the album Buffalo Springfield, 1966
4. "Go and Say Goodbye" (mono) — Buffalo Springfield
  - From the album Buffalo Springfield, 1966
5. "For What It's Worth" (mono) — Buffalo Springfield
  - From the album Buffalo Springfield (second version), 1967
6. "Everydays" — Buffalo Springfield
  - Originally released on the album Buffalo Springfield Again, 1967; 2012 remix, previously unreleased
7. "Pretty Girl Why" — Buffalo Springfield
  - Originally released on the album Last Time Around, 1968; alternate mix first appeared on the 2001 Buffalo Springfield box set
  - Note the CD booklet erroneously says originally released on Buffalo Springfield Again
8. "Bluebird" — Buffalo Springfield
  - From the album Buffalo Springfield Again, 1967
9. "Rock & Roll Woman" — Buffalo Springfield
  - From the album Buffalo Springfield Again, 1967
10. "Special Care" — Buffalo Springfield
  - From the album Last Time Around, 1968
11. "Questions" — Buffalo Springfield
  - From the album Last Time Around, 1968
12. "Uno Mundo" — Buffalo Springfield
  - From the 45 rpm single, 1968, previously unavailable on CD
13. "Four Days Gone" — Buffalo Springfield
  - Originally released on the album Last Time Around, 1968; demo version first appeared on the 2001 Buffalo Springfield box set
14. "Who Ran Away?" — Stephen Stills
  - Recorded July 10, 1968; 2012 remix, previously unreleased song
15. "49 Reasons" — Stephen Stills
  - Recorded July 10, 1968; previously unreleased demo version of song later appearing as 49 Bye-Byes on Crosby, Stills & Nash
16. "Helplessly Hoping" — Crosby, Stills & Nash
  - From the album Crosby, Stills & Nash, 1969
17. "You Don't Have to Cry" — Crosby, Stills & Nash
  - From the album Crosby, Stills & Nash, 1969
18. "Suite: Judy Blue Eyes" — Crosby, Stills & Nash
  - From the album Crosby, Stills & Nash, 1969
19. "4+20" — Stephen Stills
  - Originally released on the album Déjà Vu, 1970; recorded July 19, 1969, 2012 remix, previously unreleased
20. "So Begins the Task" — Stephen Stills
  - Originally released on the album Manassas, 1972; recorded July 1969, previously unreleased demo version
21. "The Lee Shore" (David Crosby) — Stephen Stills
  - Originally released on the album 4 Way Street, 1971; recorded July 15, 1969, previously unreleased demo version
22. "Carry On/Questions" — Crosby, Stills, Nash & Young
  - Originally released on the album Déjà Vu, 1970; December 1969 alternate mix previously unreleased
23. "Woodstock" (Joni Mitchell) — Crosby, Stills, Nash & Young
  - Originally released on the album Déjà Vu, 1970; alternate mix first appeared on the 1991 CSN box set

Disc two

1. "Love the One You're With" — Stephen Stills
  - Originally released on the album Stephen Stills, 1970; 45 rpm single mix, previously unavailable on CD
2. "Old Times Good Times" — Stephen Stills
  - From the album Stephen Stills, 1970
3. "Black Queen" — Stephen Stills
  - From the album Stephen Stills, 1970
4. "No-Name Jam" (Stills/Hendrix) — Stephen Stills feat. Jimi Hendrix
  - Recorded March 1970, previously unreleased jam
5. "Go Back Home " — Stephen Stills feat. Eric Clapton
  - From the album Stephen Stills, 1970
6. "Marianne" — Stephen Stills
  - From the album Stephen Stills 2, 1971
7. "My Love Is a Gentle Thing" — Stephen Stills
  - Recorded 1970/75, from the Manassas compilation album Pieces, 2009
8. "Fishes and Scorpions" — Stephen Stills (With Eric Clapton)
  - From the album Stephen Stills 2, 1971
9. "The Treasure" — Stephen Stills
  - Recorded March 1970; originally released on the album Manassas, 1972; previously unreleased studio version
10. "To a Flame" — Stephen Stills
  - Originally released on the album Stephen Stills, 1970; 2012 mix previously unreleased
11. "Cherokee" — Stephen Stills feat. The Memphis Horns
  - From the album Stephen Stills, 1970
12. "Song of Love" — Stephen Stills
  - From the album Manassas, 1972
13. "Rock & Roll Crazies/Cuban Bluegrass" (Stills/Taylor)/(Stills/Lala) — Stephen Stills
  - From the album Manassas, 1972
14. "Jet Set (Sigh)" — Stephen Stills
  - From the album Manassas, 1972
15. "It Doesn't Matter" (Stills/Hillman) — Stephen Stills
  - From the album Manassas, 1972
16. "Colorado" — Stephen Stills
  - From the album Manassas, 1972
17. "Johnny's Garden" — Stephen Stills
  - From the album Manassas, 1972
18. "Change Partners" — Stephen Stills
  - Originally released on the album Stephen Stills 2, 1971; 2012 mix previously unreleased
19. "Do for the Others" — Stephen Stills feat. Steven Fromholz
  - Originally released on the album Stephen Stills, 1970; previously unreleased 1971 live version (Madison Square Garden, New York, July 30, 1971)
20. "Find the Cost of Freedom" — Crosby, Stills, Nash & Young
  - Originally released as the B-side of the 45 rpm single Ohio, 1971; previously unreleased 1971 live version (Music Hall, Boston, Oct. 3, 1971)
21. "Little Miss Bright Eyes" — Stephen Stills
  - Recorded August 1973, previously unreleased
22. "Isn't It About Time" — Stephen Stills
  - From the Manassas album Down the Road, 1973

Disc three

1. "Turn Back the Pages" (Stills/Dacus) — Stephen Stills
  - From the album Stills, 1975
2. "First Things First"(Stills/Schermetzler/Smith) — Stephen Stills
  - Originally released on the album Stills, 1975; previously unreleased version with extended intro
3. "My Angel" (Stills/Taylor) — Stephen Stills
  - Originally released on the album Stills, 1975; previously unreleased 1973 mix
4. "Love Story" — Stephen Stills
  - From the album Stills, 1975
5. "As I Come of Age " — Stephen Stills
  - Originally released on the album Stills, 1975; previously unreleased 1973 mix
6. "Know You Got to Run" (Stills/Hopkins) — Stephen Stills
  - Song originally appeared on the album Stephen Stills 2, 1971. Recorded at the Paramount Theater, Seattle, December 8, 1975; previously unreleased live version
7. "Black Coral" — Crosby, Stills, Nash & Young
  - Song originally appeared on the 1976 Stills-Young Band album Long May You Run; previously unreleased version
8. "I Give You Give Blind" — Crosby, Stills & Nash
  - Originally released on the 1977 Crosby, Stills & Nash album CSN; 1976 mix appeared on the album Replay
9. "Crossroads/You Can't Catch Me" (Johnson/Berry) — Stephen Stills
  - Medley originally appeared on the 1975 album Stephen Stills Live. Recorded at a CSN show at the Civic Center, Lakeland, FL, November 19, 1977, previously unreleased live version
10. "See the Changes" — Crosby, Stills & Nash
  - Originally released on the album CSN, 1977; 2012 remix, previously unreleased
11. "Thoroughfare Gap" — Stephen Stills
  - From the album Thoroughfare Gap, 1978
12. "Lowdown" — Stephen Stills
  - From the album Thoroughfare Gap, 1978
13. "Cuba al Fin [edit]" — Stephen Stills
  - From the album Havana Jam, 1979
14. "Dear Mr. Fantasy" (Winwood/Capaldi/Wood) — Stephen Stills feat. Graham Nash
  - Full-length version of the song originally appeared on the 1991 CSN box set
15. "Spanish Suite" — Stephen Stills feat. Herbie Hancock
  - 1979 recording from the album Man Alive!, 2005
16. "Feel Your Love" — Crosby, Stills & Nash
  - From the expanded CD version of Daylight Again, 1982/2006
17. "Raise a Voice" (Nash/Stills) — Crosby, Stills & Nash
  - From the album Allies, 1983
18. "Daylight Again/Find the Cost of Freedom" — Crosby, Stills & Nash
  - From the album Daylight Again, 1982

Disc four

1. "Southern Cross" (Stills/Curtis/Curtis) — Crosby, Stills & Nash
  - From the album Daylight Again, 1982
2. "Dark Star" — Crosby, Stills & Nash
  - From the album Allies, 1983
3. "Turn Your Back on Love" (Stills/Nash/Stergis) — Crosby, Stills & Nash
  - From the album Allies, 1983
4. "War Games" — Crosby, Stills & Nash
  - From the album Allies, 1983
5. "50/50" (Stills/Lala) — Stephen Stills
  - From the album Right by You, 1984
6. "Welfare Blues" — Stephen Stills
  - Recorded live Cookham, Berkshire, UK, February 5, 1984; previously unreleased song
7. "Church (Part of Someone)" — Stephen Stills
  - Originally released on the album Stephen Stills, 1970; previously unreleased studio version
8. "I Don't Get It" — Stephen Stills
  - 1991 recording from the album Man Alive!, 2005
9. "Isn't It So " — Stephen Stills
  - From the album Stills Alone, 1991
10. "Haven't We Lost Enough?" (Stills/Cronin) — Crosby, Stills & Nash
  - From the album Live It Up, 1990
11. "The Ballad of Hollis Brown" (Dylan) — Stephen Stills
  - From the album Stills Alone, 1991
12. "Treetop Flyer " — Stephen Stills
  - From the album Stills Alone, 1991
13. "Heart's Gate" — Stephen Stills
  - From the album Man Alive!, 2005
14. "Girl from the North Country" (Dylan)— Crosby, Stills & Nash
  - Recorded live at the Beacon Theater, New York City, October 2012; previously unreleased live version
15. "Feed the People" — Stephen Stills
  - 1989 recording from the album Man Alive!, 2005
16. "Panama" — Crosby, Stills & Nash
  - From the album After the Storm, 1994
17. "No Tears Left" — Crosby, Stills & Nash
  - Recorded live at the Fillmore Auditorium, San Francisco, September 14, 1997; previously unreleased live version
18. "Ole Man Trouble" (Redding) — Crosby, Stills, Nash & Young
  - Recorded live at Madison Square Garden, New York City, February 22, 2002; previously unreleased live version
19. "Ain't It Always" — Stephen Stills
  - 1976 recording from the album Man Alive!, 2005

== Charts ==
Chart (2013)	Peak position
Dutch Albums (Album Top 100)	83
Dutch Alternative Albums (MegaCharts)	20
US Top Current Albums (Billboard)	179
US Americana/Folk Albums (Billboard)	8
