= Just Roll Tape =

Just Roll Tape: April 26th, 1968

Studio album by Stephen Stills
- Released: July 10, 2007
- Recorded: 1968
- Studio: A&R, New York City
- Genre: Rock
- Length: 40:16
- Label: Eyewall/Rhino
- Producer: Stephen Stills

Stephen Stills chronology
| Man Alive! (2005) | Just Roll Tape: April 26th, 1968 (2007) | Pieces (2009) |

Professional ratings
Review scores
| Source | Rating |
|---|---|
| AllMusic | 3.5/5 stars |
| Music Box | 3/5 stars |
| Rolling Stone | 3.5/5 stars |

Just Roll Tape: April 26, 1968 is a Stephen Stills demo album released in 2007. In the sleeve notes to the CD, Stephen Stills recalls that he was present at a Judy Collins session in New York in 1968, and when she finished with studio time remaining, Stills paid the engineer privately to let him record song demos. But Stills left the tapes in the studio and eventually considered them lost.

When the studio was about to close in 1978, musician Joe Colasurdo, who was rehearsing there, was told by the owner that he could take away any tapes he wanted to before they cleared the place out. After seeing Stills' names on several of the boxes, Colasurdo kept them safe until he could find a reel-to-reel machine to play them on. Colasurdo began attempting to get the masters safely back into Stills's hands, an undertaking that took 25 years. In 2003, he was connected to Graham Nash after happening to meet a close friend of his named Dan Curland, who owns the Mystic Disc Record Store. Nash received the tapes and passed them on to Stills, encouraging him to release them.

Stills is the only musician on the album. He sings all the songs and plays acoustic guitar and resonator guitar. "Treetop Flyer" is not from the 1968 sessions.

Note that Stills was performing at the Arizona State Fairgrounds in Phoenix, Arizona as a member of Buffalo Springfield on the date referenced in the title. The album's title erroneously dates the session to April 26, 1968, but the biographers David Roberts and David Gedge write that most of the songs were recorded months later, on August 28. Stills recorded the songs quickly in New York City at A&R Recording's 7th Avenue location, after his girlfriend Judy Collins recorded her cover of "Who Knows Where the Time Goes?" in the same studio. Stills recorded "Treetop Flyer" at a separate session.

== Track listing ==
All tracks are written by Stephen Stills, except where noted.

Side one
| No. | Title | Length |
|---|---|---|
| 1. | "All I Know Is What You Tell Me" | 1:41 |
| 2. | "So Begins the Task" (Later recorded for Manassas) | 2:26 |
| 3. | "Change Partners" (Later recorded for Stephen Stills 2) | 3:14 |
| 4. | "Know You've Got to Run" (Later recorded (and rearranged) for Stephen Stills 2 as "Know You Got to Run") | 3:12 |
| 5. | "The Doctor Will See You Now" | 2:38 |
| 6. | "Black Queen" (Later recorded for Stephen Stills) | 3:06 |
| 7. | "Bumblebee (Do You Need a Place to Hide?)" (Later recorded for Manassas as "The Love Gangster") | 1:54 |
| 8. | "Judy" (Later recorded for Everybody Knows) | 2:02 |

Side two
| No. | Title | Writer(s) | Length |
|---|---|---|---|
| 1. | "Dreaming of Snakes" | | 1:54 |
| 2. | "Suite: Judy Blue Eyes" (Later recorded for Crosby, Stills & Nash) | | 6:33 |
| 3. | "Helplessly Hoping" (Later recorded for Crosby, Stills & Nash) | | 2:11 |
| 4. | "Wooden Ships" (Later recorded for Crosby, Stills & Nash) | Stills, David Crosby, Paul Kantner | 2:26 |
| 5. | "Treetop Flyer" (Later recorded for Stills Alone) | | 7:04 |
| Total length: | | | 40:16 |

== Personnel ==
- Stephen Stills - vocals, guitar, Dobro, producer
- John Haeny - recording engineer
- Joe Vitale, Jr. - digital engineer & mixing
- Joe Vitale - mixing on track 13
- John Hanlon - mixing and digital engineer track 13
- Steven Rhodes - assistant engineer
- John Nowland - digital transfers
- James Austin & Robin Hurley - A&R Supervision
- Marc Salata - production manager
- Graham Nash - photos
- Joe Halbardier & Steve Woolard - project assistance
- Elliot Roberts - direction
