= Kristen Stills =

American film producer (born 1966)

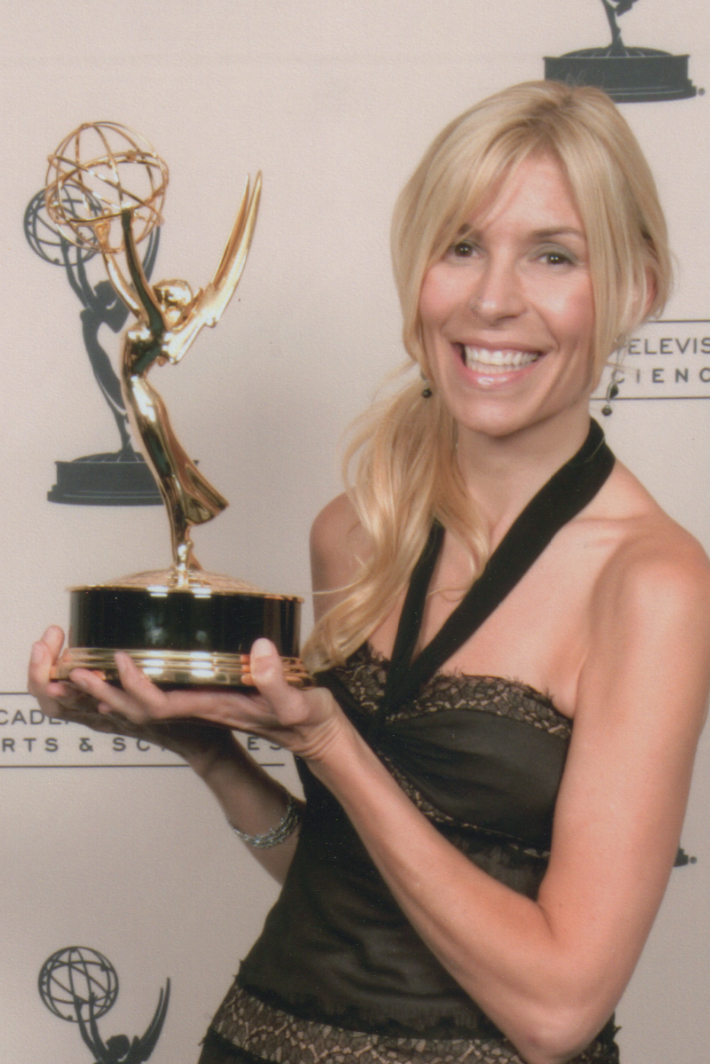
- Stills at 2008 Emmy Awards
- Born: Kristen Hathaway; October 12, 1966 (age 59); United States
- Occupations: Producer, activist
- Spouse: Stephen Stills (m. 1996)
- Children: 2

Kristen Stills (née Hathaway; born October 12, 1966) is an American producer and autism awareness activist. She is wife of American musician and multi-instrumentalist Stephen Stills of Buffalo Springfield and Crosby, Stills, Nash & Young. An autism awareness activist, Stills has hosted and promoted several events supporting organizations such as Autism Speaks. In 2008, she won an Emmy Award for Outstanding Nonfiction Special for her program Autism: The Musical.

== Career ==
Stills starred with her son Henry Stills in an independent documentary film directed by Tricia Regan titled Autism: The Musical which was released in April 2007. She received an "Outstanding Nonfiction Special" Emmy Award for her role as Executive Producer on Autism: The Musical.

Since 2012, Kristen and Stephen have hosted Light Up the Blues, an event that benefits autism science and advocacy organization Autism Speaks. The annual event has included musical performances by Crosby, Stills & Nash, Neil Young, John Mayer, The White Buffalo, Brandi Carlile, Ryan Adams, Steve Earle, Rickie Lee Jones, Lucinda Williams, Don Felder, and Chris Stills who perform alongside Spectrum Artists such as Nick Guzman, Matt Savage, and Rio "Soulshocka" Wyles. The scheduling coincides with Light It Up Blue, World Autism Awareness Day and Autism Awareness Month in April.

In 2013, Stills was executive producer for the concert film Light Up the Blues the goal of which was to raise awareness for the annual event.

== Personal life ==
In 1996, she married musician and multi-instrumentalist Stephen Stills of Buffalo Springfield and Crosby, Stills, Nash & Young. They have two sons, Henry and Oliver. Henry was diagnosed with Asperger's syndrome.
