= Live at Shepherd's Bush (Stephen Stills album) =

Live album by Stephen Stills
- Released: November 2, 2009
- Genre: Rock
- Length: 79:53
- Labels: Rhino, Eyewall, Atco
- Producer: Stephen Stills

Stephen Stills chronology
Pieces (2009)	Live at Shepherd's Bush (2009)	Carry On (2013)

Live at Shepherd's Bush is a 2009 live album released by Stephen Stills and recorded at Shepherds Bush Empire in London, UK in October 2008. The album featured an acoustic set and an electric set. A DVD with the same track listing was also released.

== Reception ==
In a positive review AllMusic said "the whole thing has a warm, engaging vibe; it's a pleasing bit of nostalgia".

== Track listing ==
All tracks are written by Stephen Stills, except where indicated.

Acoustic Set
No.	Title	Writer(s)	Length
1.	"Treetop Flyer"		6:35
2.	"4+20"		3:43
3.	"Johnny's Garden"		3:15
4.	"Change Partners"		2:37
5.	"Girl from the North Country"	Bob Dylan	4:06
6.	"Blind Fiddler"		5:23
7.	"Suite: Judy Blue Eyes"		9:23

Electric Set
No.	Title	Writer(s)	Length
1.	"Isn't It About Time"		5:12
2.	"Rock & Roll Woman"		6:46
3.	"Wrong Thing to Do"	Tom Petty	6:16
4.	"Wounded World / Rocky Mountain Way"	Graham Nash, Stills / Rocke Grace, Kenny Passarelli, Joe Vitale, Joe Walsh	7:30
5.	"Bluebird"		6:28
6.	"For What It's Worth"		7:18
7.	"Love the One You're With"		5:21
Total length:			79:53

== Personnel ==
- Stephen Stills - guitar, vocals
- Kenny Passarelli - bass, vocals
- Joe Vitale - drums, vocals
- Todd Caldwell - keyboards, vocals
- Joe Vitale Jr - editing, mixing
