= 4 + 20 =

Song by Crosby, Stills, Nash & Young

from the album Déjà Vu
- Released: March 11, 1970
- Genre: Folk
- Length: 2:06
- Label: Atlantic
- Songwriter: Stephen Stills
- Producers: Crosby, Stills, Nash & Young

"4 + 20" is a song by Crosby, Stills, Nash & Young, written by Stephen Stills, originally released on the band's 1970 album Déjà Vu. It was performed by Stephen Stills on solo acoustic guitar.

The song describes the inner torments and reflections of a man on his past, present and future. In the CSN boxed set, Stills stated: "It's about an 84-year-old poverty stricken man who started and finished with nothing." However, the lyrics state that the narrator was born 24 years ago, making him about a year younger than Stills was when the song was recorded.

Stills recorded the song in one take and planned to use it on his upcoming debut solo album, but when his bandmates heard it, they implored him to use it on the Déjà Vu album. He planned to have bandmates David Crosby and Graham Nash sing harmony parts, but they refused. "They told me they wouldn't touch it," said Stills. "So it always stood alone." On the highly-collaborative Déjà Vu album, "4 + 20" stands out as the only song which was both written and performed solo by one member of the band, justified by Crosby who recalled "We just said, 'It's too damn good, we're not touching it.'"

One of the first times, if not the first time, the song was played live was August 17, 1969 at Woodstock by Crosby, Stills, Nash & Young. Young was not part of the song's performance as he skipped the acoustic part of the set. Two days later Stills performed the song solo for the Woodstock edition of The Dick Cavett Show.

== Personnel ==
- Stephen Stills – lead vocals, acoustic guitar
