= Illegal Stills =

Studio album by Stephen Stills
- Released: May 7, 1976
- Recorded: 1974, 1975, January - February 1976
- Studios: Criteria Studios (Miami); Caribou Ranch (Colorado); Cherokee Studios (Los Angeles).
- Genre: Rock
- Length: 35:25
- Label: Columbia
- Producers: Stephen Stills; Don Gehman

Stephen Stills chronology
Stephen Stills Live (1975)	Illegal Stills (1976)	Long May You Run (1976)

Singles from Illegal Stills
- 1. ""Buyin' Time" / "Soldier"" Released: April 1976; 2. ""The Loner" / "Stateline Blues"" Released: 16 September 1976

Professional ratings
Review scores
Source	Rating
AllMusic	2/5 stars
The Encyclopedia of Popular Music	2/5 stars
The Rolling Stone Album Guide	1/5 stars

Illegal Stills is an album released by American musician Stephen Stills on 7 May 1976. This was Stills second album on Columbia Records and his fourth solo album overall. After it was released he would start an album and tour with Neil Young. It was released on CD in 1991 (Columbia CK-34148). The album charted at number 31 in the US on release, but wasn't a critical success.

== Recording ==
The majority of this album was recorded in Criteria Studios over January and February 1976, with the majority of his road band from his 1975 tours. Stills experimented with adding Crosby & Nash-like harmonies by using Howard Kaylan and Mark Volman (otherwise known as Flo & Eddie). In the other studio were the Bee Gees working on their Children of the World album, to which Stills added percussion to the hit song "You Should Be Dancing." During this time Barry Gibb and Stills wrote an unreleased song together.

== Songs ==
The liner notes describe the songs as follows:

Side 1

"Buyin' Time" - "Written midst the 1975's Presidential placations over our economic woes. Recorded at Criteria Studios with vocals done at Caribou Ranch. Piano overdub by Stephen at Criteria."

"Midnight In Paris" - "Recorded at Criteria with Vocals at Caribou Ranch. French vocal - no expense spared and with Great Mental Torment (not the name of a group-rather a state of mind) by Stephen. Written by Veronique Sanson Stills for Donnie's song."

"Different Tongues" - "Basis recorded at Criteria with vocals at Caribou. Written in London, October 1974, after the CSNY tour, by Donnie and Stephen in their hotel room. The key change was suggested later in Miami by George Terry, Eric's guitar player. Acoustic piano by Stephen and string synthesizer arrangement by Stephen with the great Joe Vitale - we were already mixing by then. Special thanks to Jim Friedman for pulling us all together."

"Soldier" - "Another hotel song, expressing feelings had and people known for a long time. Piano, lead guitar, and synthesizer by Stephen."

"The Loner" - "Always wanted to do it. Had a song riff like 'Crossroads' but thought 'why try to write another when there is already a great song around.' Spent a lot of time with different lead guitar ideas."

Side 2

"Stateline Blues" - "A Tahoe tune. Always seem to end up with an acoustic tune on the album. Played it live on Dobro for a few months, but it sounded richer on Maybelle, the oldest D-45, with just a Dobro solo. Stephen overdubbed bass part later, as did Joe Vitale on brush drums."

"Closer to You" - "Donnie's outstanding twelve-string throughout the track sets up a simply great song."

"No Me Niegas" - "Lala had to play right on this one. We tried to get a classic latin feel and of course the holes in the percussion are as solid as the beats. Piano and synthesizer by Stephen."

"Ring of Love" - "Donnie pulled this one out of his past. Flo and Eddie worked on him the better part of an evening 'till he forgot he wasn't supposed to be having a good time singing. 'Smiracles will happen!"

"Circlin'" - "Cut three different times, this one sounds the best. Recorded at Cherokee in LA, after we had just finished all basics and vocals for the album. Just one of those nights when everyone was there. Joe Vitale played drums. Lead guitar and piano overdub is Stephen."

== Artwork and packaging ==
The album is noted for its creative artwork, placing Stills's head on the label of a moonshine jar, a pun on the album's title. A lyric sheet was also included with a description of each track.

== Release ==
The album charted at No. 31 on the Billboard 200, the week of 4 July 1976, during a 15-week run. It also peaked at No. 31 in Canada, and No. 54 in the UK. "Buyin' Time" was released as a single but didn't chart. Stills supported the album with a tour in November 1976.

== Reception ==
In a contemporary review Billboard said, "Typical laid-back Stills with usual better than average songs and instrumental work from Donnie Dacus, George Perry, Joe Vitale, Tubby Ziegler and several others. Flo and Eddie join in on vocals. For Stills fans, this LP is exactly what they expect. The only criticism might be that the artist doesn't seem to get above a fixed energy level until near the end of side two, when he swings into a Latin-flavored cut and several easy rockers. Stills is strong on the more uptempo cuts and should do more."

Critical reception was mixed. Rolling Stone did not bother to review the album; however Steve Clarke for the NME in a review praised the production work and said, "There is such a thing as the Stephen Stills sound and like Phil Spector and Brian Wilson's sound it's a big aural landscape." Clarke concluded his piece with, "Illegal Stills is a well paced album with a flowing sense of continuity totally absent from Stills and bears the marks of simply first grade rock talent." Many critics said there was not enough guitar playing from Stills, and there was too much influence from Donnie Dacus, so much so that people thought it could have been credited to both Stills and Dacus. Record Mirror, in 1976, received the album positively saying it "sounds fresh yet comfortably familiar" and complemented Stills on the production, calling it some of the "cleanest producing in sometime". They chose "Soldier' as a highlight saying it had that instant classic sound on first listen.

In 1978, Stills commented that "Nothing I tried seemed to work out right. It was just a bad time for me. I couldn't pin anything down".

== Track listing ==
All tracks are written by Stephen Stills, except where noted.

Side one
No.	Title	Writer(s)	Length
1.	"Buyin' Time"		3:36
2.	"Midnight in Paris"	Donnie Dacus, Véronique Sanson	4:00
3.	"Different Tongues"	Stills, Donnie Dacus	3:09
4.	"Soldier"	Donnie Dacus, Stills	2:59
5.	"The Loner"	Neil Young	4:16

Side two
No.	Title	Writer(s)	Length
1.	"Stateline Blues"		1:59
2.	"Closer to You"	Dacus, Warner Schwebke, Stills	3:36
3.	"No Me Niegas"		3:33
4.	"Ring of Love"	Dacus, Stills	4:02
5.	"Circlin'"	Kenny Passarelli, Stills	4:20
Total length:			35:25

== Personnel ==
As listed on album sleeve.

- Stephen Stills – vocals, keyboards, guitars, bass
- Jerry Aiello – keyboards
- Donnie Dacus – guitars, vocals
- George Terry – guitars
- George "Chocolate" Perry – bass
- Joe Vitale – drums
- Ron "Tubby" Zeigler – drums
- Joe Lala – percussion
- Howard Kaylan – vocals
- Mark Volman – vocals

== Production ==
- Stephen Stills – producer
- Don Gehman – producer, recording, mixing
- Howard Albert – recording
- Ron Albert – recording
- Alex Sadkin – mixing, mastering
- John Berg – cover concept, design
- Gerard Huerta – artwork, design
- Don Hunstein – cover photography
- Tom Zimmhoff – photo of Stephen Stills
- Michael John Bowen – management

== Charts ==
Chart performance for Illegal Stills
Chart (1976)	Peak position
Australia (Kent Music Report)	79
US Billboard Top LPs & Tape	31
UK Album Charts	54
Canadian RPM 100 Albums	31
Dutch MegaCharts Albums	17
US Cash Box Top 100 Albums	49
US Record World Album Chart	43

== Tour ==
Stephen Stills 1976 Tour
- Tour by Stephen Stills
- Start date: 4 October 1976
- End date: 20 November 1976
- Legs: 1

Stephen Stills concert chronology
- The Stills-Young Band Tour; Stephen Stills 1976 Tour; 1979 California Blues Band Tour

The Stephen Stills 1976 Tour was a concert tour by American musician Stephen Stills, it was his first tour after Neil Young pulled out of The Stills-Young Band tour. This was a smaller tour in which Stills generally played acoustic for the first half, then only played as a three piece, with drums and bass for the electric/piano set. Some dates Stills played acoustic for the whole show including The Palladium date. A European tour in June 1976 was cancelled at short notice due to Stills reuniting with Neil Young. Stills was due to play Ninian Stadium, Cardiff, Wales to 40,000 fans on 5 June but pulled out at the last minute. Bob Marley replaced him.

Date	City	Country	Venue	Attendance	Gross	Notes
Odd gigs/festivals
26 January 1976	Houston	United States	Astrodome			Night of the Hurricane Benefit Concert
~~5 June 1976~~	~~Cardiff~~	~~United Kingdom~~	~~Ninean Stadium~~			
6 June 1976	Offenberg	Germany	Sunrise Festival			Headlined
14 August 1976	Milwaukee	United States	Summerfest			
22 August 1976	San Diego	United States	San Diego Sports Arena	5,900		
24 August 1976	Los Angeles	United States	LA Forum	14,500	$110,000	
Illegal Stills Tour
17 October 1976	Los Angeles	United States	Bill Graham Civic Auditorium	3,425		
21 October 1976	Lebanon	United States	Astor Theatre			
22 October 1976	Upper Darby	United States	Tower Theatre	6,292	$16,904	
24 October 1976	Pittsburgh	United States	Syria Mosque			
25 October 1976	New York	United States	The Palladium			
26 October 1976	Pittsburgh	United States	Syria Mosque			
27 October 1976	Morgantown	United States	WVU Coliseum			
31 October 1976	Michigan	United States	MSU Auditorium			
4 November 1976	New York	United States	Palace Theatre			
5 November 1976	Orlando	United States	University of Florida Gym			
6 November 1976	Alabama	United States	Pete Mathews Coliseum			
7 November 1976	New Orleans	United States	McAlister Auditorium			
9 November 1976	Hattiesburg	United States	USM Coliseum			
13 November 1976	Newport	United States	Odu Fieldhouse			
14 November 1976	Chapel Hill	United States	Greensboro Triad Arena			
17 November 1976	New York	United States	Rose Hill Gymnasium			
18 November 1976	Washington	United States	DAR Constitution Hall			
19 November 1976	New Jersey	United States	Dillon Gymnasium			
20 November 1976	Boston	United States	Orpheum Theatre			

Tour personnel

- Stephen Stills - Guitar, Piano, Vocals
- George "Chocolate" Perry - Bass
- Joe Vitale - Drums
