= Man Alive! (Stephen Stills album) =

Studio album by Stephen Stills
- Released: August 9, 2005
- Recorded: 1970–2005
- Genre: Rock
- Length: 57:51
- Label: Titan/Pyramid Records
- Producers: Stephen Stills, Joe Vitale

Stephen Stills chronology
Turnin' Back the Pages (2003)	Man Alive! (2005)	Just Roll Tape (2007)

Singles from Stephen Stills
- 1. ""Wounded World"/"Acadienne"" Released: 2005

Professional ratings
Review scores
Source	Rating
Rolling Stone	3/5 stars
Allmusic	(not rated)
Encyclopedia of Popular Music	4/5 stars

Man Alive! is the eighth studio album by Stephen Stills, released in 2005. It is a mixture of old and new recordings.

== Overview ==
According to the notes of Stephen Stills's 2013 box set Carry On, some of these old and new recordings were dated as follows:

- "Ain't It Always" from December 1976,
- "Spanish Suite" from April 1979 during the sessions of his unfinished 1979 album,
- "Feed the People" from 1989 but with everything but the backing vocals replaced later, and
- "I Don't Get It" in 1991.
- Zimmer's biography of Crosby, Stills & Nash places "Acadienne" with songs for CSNY's 1999 album Looking Forward, and based on the personnel it is from April 1998.

Dates of the others are unknown.

- "Drivin' Thunder" appeared the CSNY album American Dream in 1988, but Stills wrote new lyrics for the version on this album.
- Stills introduced "Heart's Gate" as a new song in concert in 2003.

Graham Nash sings on "Acadienne", "Feed the People", and "Wounded World", which he co-wrote. Neil Young plays on the traditional "Different Man" and "Round the Bend", while Herbie Hancock plays on "Spanish Suite". Stills drew the back and front cover.

== Track listing ==
All tracks are written by Stephen Stills, except where noted.

No.	Title	Writer(s)	Length
1.	"Ain't It Always"		3:25
2.	"Feed the People"		4:24
3.	"Hearts Gate"		2:59
4.	"Round the Bend"		5:12
5.	"I Don't Get It"		3:35
6.	"Around Us"	Joe Vitale, Stills	3:47
7.	"Ole Man Trouble"	Booker T. Jones	4:56
8.	"Different Man"	Traditional	2:10
9.	"Piece of Me"		4:09
10.	"Wounded World"	Stills, Graham Nash	3:12
11.	"Drivin' Thunder"	Stills, Neil Young	4:30
12.	"Acadienne"		4:02
13.	"Spanish Suite"		11:20
Total length:			57:51

== Personnel ==
- Stephen Stills – lead vocals, acoustic piano (1), lead guitar (1), guitars (2–13), bass (2, 4–6, 13), percussion (2, 5, 11, 13), backing vocals (2, 4, 5, 11), organ (4), keyboards (5, 7, 10)
- Mike Finnigan – organ (1, 2, 6, 7, 10, 11), backing vocals (1, 2, 12, 13), accordion (12)
- Herbie Hancock – acoustic piano (13)
- George Terry – rhythm guitar (1)
- Neil Young – guitars (4, 8), harmony vocals (8)
- George "Chocolate" Perry – bass (1), backing vocals (1)
- Gerald Johnson – bass (7, 10–13)
- Joe Vitale – drums (1, 2, 5–7, 10–12), percussion (1, 4, 12), backing vocals (1), organ (5), keyboards (6), synthesizers (11)
- Russ Kunkel – drums (4), percussion (4)
- Billy Meeker – drums (13)
- Joe Vitale Jr. – percussion (2, 6)
- Joe Lala – percussion (12, 13)
- Willie Bobo – percussion (13)
- Pete Escovedo – percussion (13)
- Jimmy Zavelo – harmonica (9, 10)
- Steve Madaio – trumpet (13)
- Dorian Holley – backing vocals (2, 5–7, 10)
- Brooks Hunnicutt – backing vocals (2, 13)
- Mortonette Jenkins – backing vocals (2, 5–7, 10)
- Marlena Jeter – backing vocals (2, 5–7, 10)
- Graham Nash – backing vocals (2, 10, 12)
- Jennifer Stills – backing vocals (5)

== Production ==
- Russ Kunkel – executive producer, digital editing (3, 4)
- Stephen Stills – executive producer, producer, engineer (5), art direction, cover concept, front and back cover drawings
- Joe Vitale – executive producer, producer (1, 2, 4–8, 10–13), engineer (1–12), digital editing (13)
- Michael Braunstein – engineer (1, 13)
- Joe Vitale Jr. – digital editing (1, 2, 4, 6, 8, 10, 13)
- Andy Brohard – digital editing (3)
- John Porter – digital editing (6)
- John Hiler – mixing
- Bernie Grundman – mastering at Bernie Grundman Mastering (Hollywood, California)
- Gary Burden – design
- Jenice Heo – design
- Henry Diltz – photography
- Jake Schoellkopf – inside folder photography
