= Stephen Stills =

American musician (born 1945)

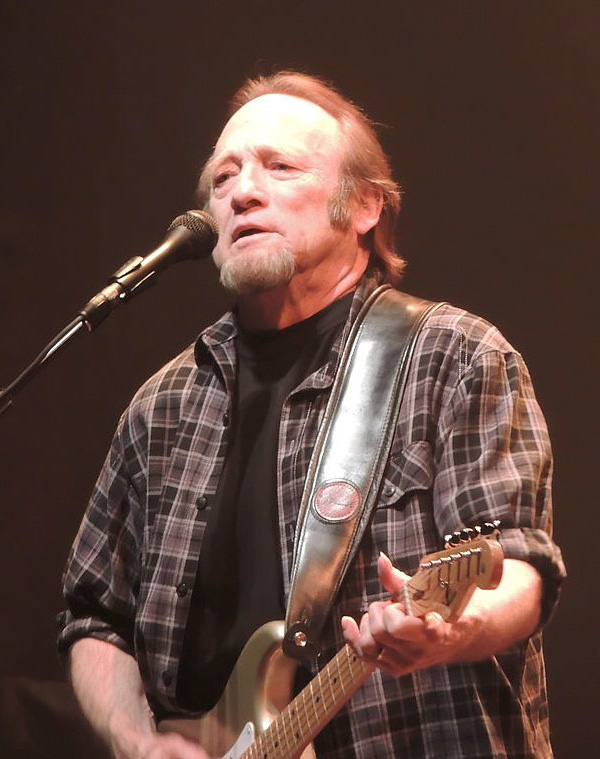
- Stills at the Beacon Theatre, 2012
- Born: Stephen Arthur Stills; January 3, 1945 (age 81); Dallas, Texas, U.S.
- Occupations: Musician; singer; songwriter; record producer
- Years active: 1963–present
- Spouses: Véronique Sanson (m. 1973; div. 1979) Pamela Ann Jordan (m. 1987; div. 1995) Kristen Hathaway (m. 1996)
- Children: 7, including Jen and Chris
- Musical career
- Genres: Rock; folk; country; psychedelia
- Instruments: Vocals; guitar; bass guitar; keyboards
- Labels: Atlantic; Columbia; Reprise; Vision; Raven; Titan/Pyramid; Talking Elephant
- Member of: The Rides
- Formerly of: The Au Go Go Singers; Buffalo Springfield; Crosby, Stills, Nash & Young; The Stills–Young Band; Manassas
- Website: stephenstills.com

Stephen Arthur Stills (born January 3, 1945) is an American musician, singer, and songwriter known for his work with Buffalo Springfield; Crosby, Stills & Nash; and Manassas. As both a solo act and member of three successful bands, Stills has combined record sales of over 35 million albums. He was ranked number 28 in Rolling Stone's 2003 list of "The 100 Greatest Guitarists of All Time" and number 47 in the 2011 list. Stills became the first person to be inducted twice on the same night into the Rock and Roll Hall of Fame.

Early in his professional career with Buffalo Springfield, he composed "For What It's Worth", which became one of the most recognizable songs of the 1960s. Other notable songs he contributed to the band were "Sit Down, I Think I Love You", "Bluebird", and "Rock & Roll Woman".

After Buffalo Springfield disbanded, Stills began working with David Crosby and Graham Nash as the trio called Crosby, Stills & Nash (CSN). In addition to writing many of the band's songs, Stills played bass, guitar, and keyboards on their debut album. The album sold over four million copies and at that point had outsold anything from the three members' prior bands: the Byrds, Buffalo Springfield, and the Hollies. The album won the trio a Grammy Award for Best New Artist.

Stills' first solo album, Stephen Stills, earned a gold record and is the only album to feature both Jimi Hendrix and Eric Clapton. Its hit single "Love the One You're With" became his biggest solo hit, peaking at number 14 on the Billboard Hot 100. Stills followed this with a string of solo albums, as well as starting a band with Chris Hillman called Manassas in 1972. In summer 1974, Young reunited with CSN after a four-year hiatus for a concert tour that was recorded and released in 2014 as CSNY 1974. It was one of the first stadium tours and the largest tour the band has done to date. CSN reunited in 1977 for its album CSN, which became the trio's best-selling record. CSN and CSNY continued to have platinum albums through the 1980s.

== Early years ==
Stills was born in Dallas, Texas, to Talitha Quintilla Collard (1919–1996) and William Arthur Stills (1915–1986). Stills moved frequently as a child and developed an interest in blues and folk music. He was also influenced by Latin music after spending his youth in Gainesville and Tampa, Florida, as well as Covington, Louisiana, Costa Rica, the Panama Canal Zone, and El Salvador. Stills attended H.B. Plant High School in Tampa, Florida, Admiral Farragut Academy in St. Petersburg, Florida and Saint Leo College Preparatory School in Saint Leo, Florida, before graduating from Lincoln High School in Costa Rica. He has two sisters, Talitha and Hannah.

When he was nine years old, he was diagnosed with partial hearing loss in one ear. The hearing loss increased as he got older.

Stills dropped out of Louisiana State University in the early 1960s. He played in a series of bands, including the Continentals, which then featured future Eagles guitarist Don Felder. Stills also sang as a solo artist at Gerde's Folk City, a well-known coffeehouse in Greenwich Village. Stills eventually joined a nine-member vocal harmony ensemble, the house act at the Cafe au Go Go in New York City, called the Au Go Go Singers, which included his future Buffalo Springfield bandmate Richie Furay. This ensemble did some touring in the Catskills and in the South, released one album in 1964, and then broke up in 1965.

Stills later formed a folk-rock band called the Company with four other former members of the Au Go Go Singers. The Company embarked on a six-week tour of Canada, where Stills met guitarist Neil Young. On the VH1 CSNY Legends special, Stills said that Young was doing what he always wanted to do: "play folk music in a rock band". The Company broke up in New York within four months; Stills did session work and went to various auditions. In 1966 he convinced a reluctant Furay, then living in Massachusetts, to move with him to California. Stills nominally auditioned for the group that would become The Monkees; the producers of the show decided he was not photogenic enough for the part nor were they interested in his songwriting, but did accept Stills's recommendation for someone who looked vaguely like him but more attractive: Peter Tork.

== Life and career ==
=== Buffalo Springfield and Super Session (1966–1968) ===
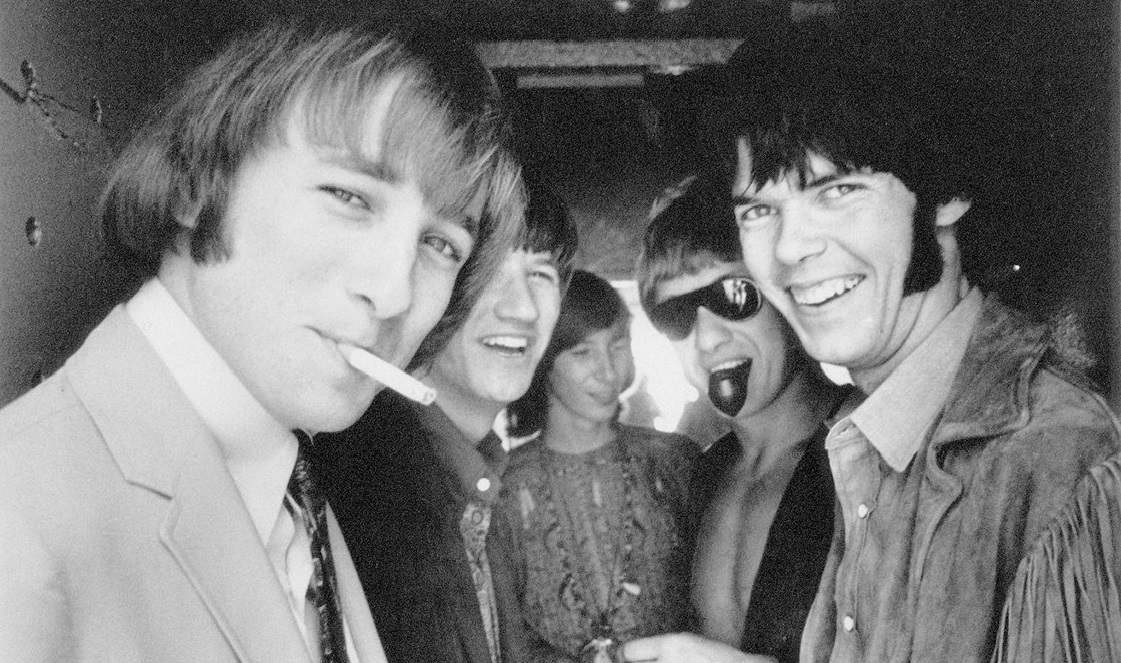
Buffalo Springfield in 1966

Stills, Furay, and Young reunited in Los Angeles and formed the core of Buffalo Springfield. Legend has it that Stills and Furay recognized Young's converted hearse and flagged him down, a meeting described in a recent solo track "Round the Bend". Buffalo Springfield performed a mixture of folk, country, psychedelia, and rock. Its sound was lent a hard edge by the twin lead guitars of Stills and Young, and that combination helped make Buffalo Springfield a critical success. The band's first record Buffalo Springfield (1966) sold well after Stills's topical song "For What It's Worth" became a top ten hit, reaching No. 7 on the US charts.

Distrust of their management along with the arrest and deportation of bassist Bruce Palmer worsened the already strained relations among the group members and led to Buffalo Springfield's demise. A second album, Buffalo Springfield Again, was released in late 1967 and featured Stills songs "Bluebird" and "Rock And Roll Woman". In May 1968, the band split up for good, but contractual obligations required the recording and release of a final studio album, Last Time Around. The album was primarily composed of tracks recorded earlier that year. A Stills song from their debut album, "Sit Down, I Think I Love You", was a minor hit for The Mojo Men in 1967.

After the disintegration of Buffalo Springfield, Stills played on half of the Super Session album with Al Kooper in 1968, including a cover of Donovan's "Season of the Witch" that received heavy radio play on progressive FM radio formats. Mike Bloomfield was slated to play on the other half of the album but failed to turn up for the second day of recording. The album sold well and charted at No. 12 on the US charts while being certified Gold in December 1970.

=== Joni Mitchell (1968–1972) ===
As a session musician, Stills featured on various albums recorded by fellow artist Joni Mitchell. He was invited by David Crosby to play on Mitchell's 1968 debut album Song to a Seagull, on the track "Night in the City". Throughout the years from 1968 to 1972, Stills played on a variety of Mitchell's studio albums such as Song to a Seagull, Clouds, Ladies of the Canyon, Blue, and For the Roses. Mitchell used his bass playing for songs like "Carey".

Stills was an influence on Mitchell's dulcimer sound, since she first discovered the instrument at Big Sur in 1969. Mitchell had observed Stills' aggressive, rhythmic style and transformed it into a unique rawness. She embraced her new sound, which can be heard on the 1970 album Blue. In 1972, Stills was credited as the rock 'n' roll band in "Blonde in the Bleachers". His multi-instrumentalist musicianship can be heard in these guest appearances on her albums. Stills' rendition with CS&N of Mitchell's "Woodstock" transformed her folk-based song into an electric rock 'n' roll showpiece.

=== Crosby, Stills, Nash & Young (1969–1970) ===
In late 1968, Stills joined forces with David Crosby (late of The Byrds) and Graham Nash (late of The Hollies) to form Crosby, Stills & Nash. Several of Stills's songs on the group's debut album, including "Suite: Judy Blue Eyes" and "You Don't Have to Cry", were inspired by his on-again off-again relationship with singer Judy Collins. The album reached No. 6 on the US charts and was certified quadruple platinum.

Stills dominated the recording of the album. Crosby and Nash played guitar on their own songs respectively, while drummer Dallas Taylor played on four tracks and drummer Jim Gordon on a fifth. Stills played all the bass, organ, and lead guitar parts, as well as acoustic guitar on his own songs.

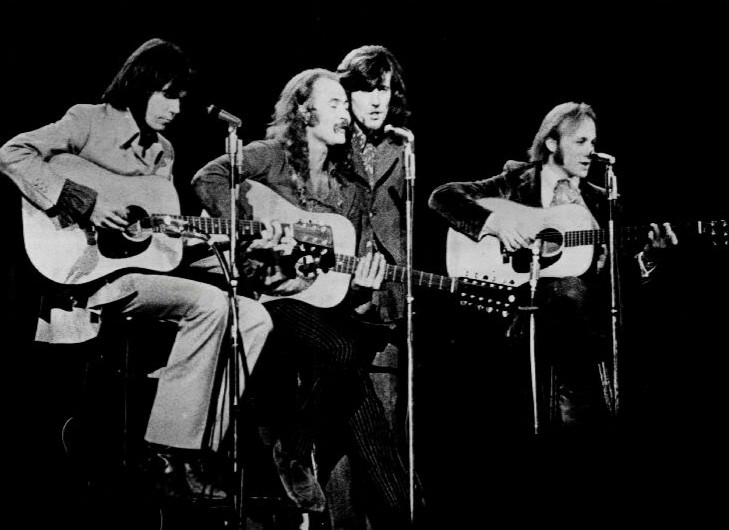
Crosby Stills Nash and Young 1970

Wanting to tour and needing additional musicians to fill out their sound, the band invited former Buffalo Springfield member Neil Young to join them for their first tour and second album to make the group the quartet Crosby, Stills, Nash & Young (initialized as CSN&Y). The first tour started in August 1969 and finished in January 1970, followed by the recording their debut album as a quartet, Déjà Vu (1970). The foursome quarrelled frequently throughout the recording sessions, in particular Stills and Young, who both fought for control. Stills composed the songs "Carry On" and "4 + 20" and co-wrote "Everybody I Love You" with Young. He also brought his version of Joni Mitchell's song "Woodstock" for the band to cover. The album reached No. 1 on the US charts and was certified 7 times platinum there, selling over 8 million copies.

In May 1970, CSN&Y recorded Young's "Ohio" following the Kent State massacre on May 4. The single's B-side was Stills's "Find the Cost of Freedom". The single was rush-released by Atlantic Records at the same time as the group's "Teach Your Children" was climbing the charts. After an extended second tour finishing in July 1970, the band split up acrimoniously. Stills moved to England and started recording his debut solo album.

In April 1971, CSN&Y released 4 Way Street, a double live album recorded in 1970. The album reached No. 1 in 1971 on the US charts and was certified quadruple platinum in the US.

Having played at the Monterey Pop Festival with Buffalo Springfield and both Woodstock and Altamont with CSN&Y, Stills (along with Crosby) performed at three of the most iconic U.S. rock festivals of the 1960s. During CSN&Y's set at Altamont Free Concert, Stills was reported to have been repeatedly stabbed in the leg by a "stoned-out" Hells Angel, with a sharpened bicycle spoke. At the band's request, their performance was not included in the subsequent film Gimme Shelter.

=== Peak solo years (1970–71) ===
In the wake of CSNY's success, all four members recorded high-profile solo albums. In 1970, Stills released his eponymous solo debut album featuring guests Eric Clapton, Jimi Hendrix, Cass Elliot, Booker T Jones and Ringo Starr (credited only as "Richie") as well as Crosby, Nash, Rita Coolidge and CSN&Y drummers Dallas Taylor and Johnny Barbata. It provided Stills with the US No. 14 hit single "Love the One You're With", and another US top 40 hit "Sit Yourself Down", peaking at No. 37. The album peaked at No. 3 on the US charts, a solo career peak. At the time of release, Stills's album was the highest selling solo album out of the four. It was recorded in the UK, where Stills bought a mansion in Surrey, England, previously owned by Starr. To promote the album, Stills appeared on the BBC television show Disco 2 in January 1971.

The 1970 album cover was shot by photographer Henry Diltz in Colorado, in the early hours of the morning after the death of Jimi Hendrix. Hendrix's untimely death affected Stills immensely. Ever since being first introduced to Hendrix at the Monterey Pop Festival in 1967, Stills was inspired by the guitarist and had befriended him. In 1969, Stills was invited to temporarily join the Jimi Hendrix Experience on tour as their bass player, but was held up by previous commitments with CSN&Y. In early 1971, on the French music show Pop 2, Stills talked about the influence that Hendrix had on him as a person and a musician:

Jimi [Hendrix] probably had more effect on my music than anybody else. He defined the modernization of the old country blues, as played by Blind Willie Johnson, Robert Johnson, and Blind Lemon Jefferson and all those little dudes, y’know. Since I met Lightnin' Hopkins in 1961, he was the first musician that got me off that hard, he tore my brains out, y’know. I really enjoyed the honour of being able to have him come to my record; to my studio, to my family, to my rhythm section, to my track, y’know. And when Jimi plays guitar, I get really knocked out, it's truly the best—and it broke my heart when he died. And he brought me to a place where I really decided that rock 'n' roll, as we know it right now, has got to change and I want to try help it change.

— Stephen Stills, Pop 2 (1971)

Stills followed this first album with his second solo album, Stephen Stills 2, six months later. Recorded in Miami, the album included the singles "Change Partners" and "Marianne", which reached Nos. 43 and 42 in the US. The album itself reached No. 8 on the chart and was certified US Gold a month after release. Even though "Change Partners" was written before CSN formed, Nash saw it as a metaphor for the many relationships in CSN&Y. Stills initially recorded 23 songs and hoped to release them as a double album; this was ultimately rejected by Atlantic.

Stills embarked on his first solo US tour with an eight-piece band including the Memphis Horns, in which he sold out Madison Square Garden, The Philadelphia Spectrum, LA Forum and the Boston Garden, arguably at his solo commercial peak. Stills's performance at Madison Square Garden occurred one day prior to George Harrison's Concert For Bangladesh. Stills donated his stage, sound, lighting system and production manager, but was later upset when Harrison "neglected to invite him to perform, mention his name, or say thank you". Stills then spent the show drunk in Ringo Starr's dressing room, "barking at everyone". Stills's Madison Square Garden show was professionally recorded and remains unreleased, except for a clip of "Go Back Home" that was broadcast in early 1972 on The Old Grey Whistle Test. Two additional acoustic tracks were released on Stills's 2013 box set Carry On.

In 1971, Billboard magazine ranked him at No. 34 top singles artist, No. 44 top album artist, No. 14 top singles male vocalist, No. 12 top new singles vocalist, No. 17 top album male vocalists, No. 14 top new album artist, number 73 top producers, and ranked his debut album number 70 in the year end album charts. Additionally, Cashbox ranked Stephen Stills 2 as the No. 51 album of 1971, and his debut as No. 52.

=== Manassas (1971–1973) ===
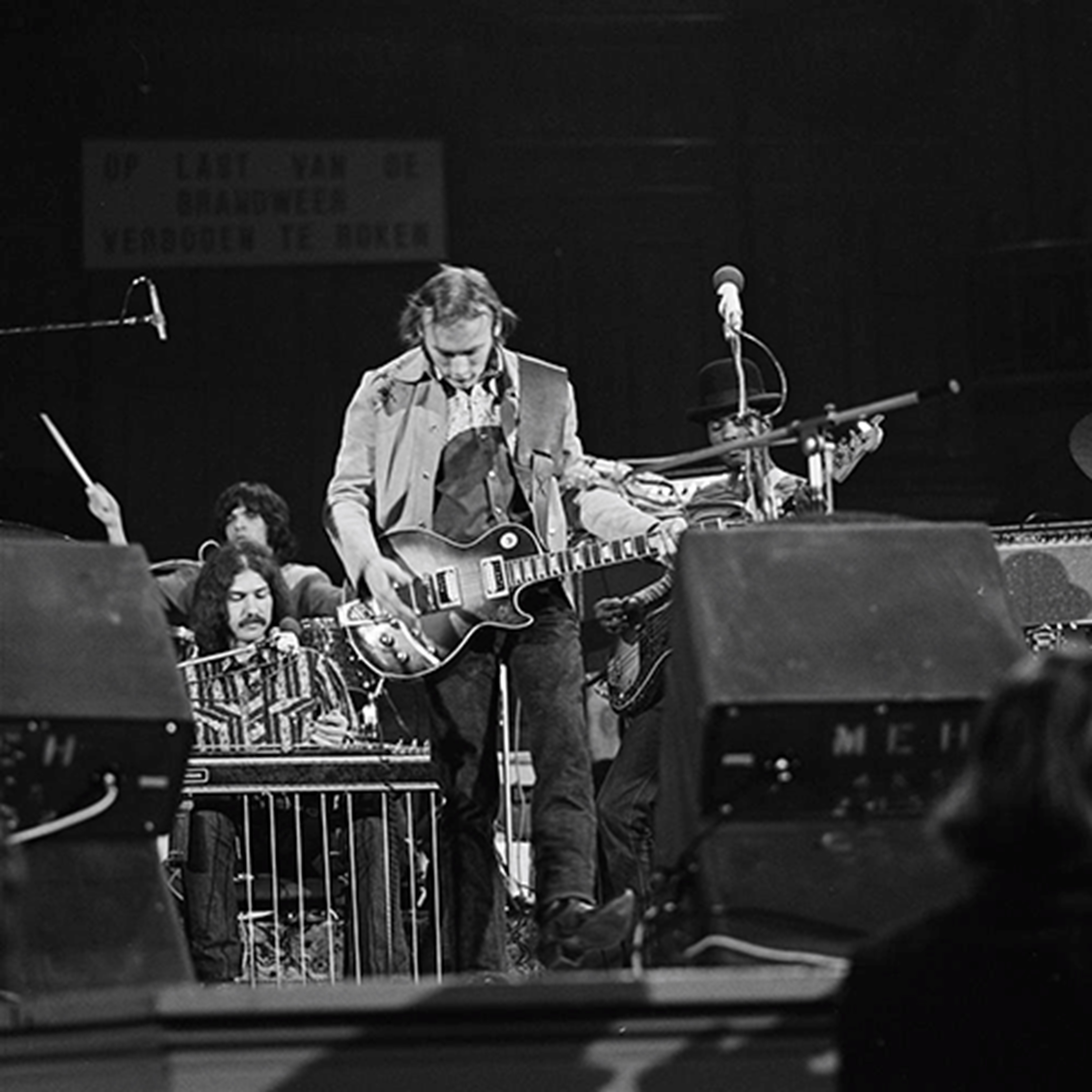
Manassas (TopPop 1972)

In late 1971, Stills teamed up with ex-Byrd Chris Hillman to form the band Manassas. Their self-titled double album was a mixture of rock, country, blues, bluegrass and Latin music divided into different sections and peaked at number 4 in the US. It was certified US Gold a month after release but did not yield any more top 40 hits, only "It Doesn't Matter" reached 61 on the US charts. Stills spent the majority of 1972 playing live with Manassas on a world tour, which included headlining festivals in Australia, playing more arenas in the US including the Nassau Coliseum, and the Boston Garden. His concert at The Rainbow Theatre in London was recorded for a BBC TV special titled Stephen Stills Manassas: In Concert. He moved to Boulder, Colorado after this world tour finished and in March 1973 married French singer-songwriter Véronique Sanson in London, after having met while at a Manassas gig in France, 1972. In early 1972, Stills appeared in a UK documentary about himself called Sounding Out. Cashbox magazine ranked Stills as the number 52 top male vocalist of 1972. Billboard ranked Manassas as the number 53 album of 1972, and Stills as the number 75 album artist.

All of Stills' albums after Buffalo Springfield had gone either gold or platinum; the Manassas follow-up album the next year Down the Road was his first LP that did not, but still managed to reach 26 in the US charts. It was recorded less than a year after the debut double album, and encountered some issues with recording and not having enough Stills songs on the album. Also Atlantic were pushing for a far more commercially viable CSNY reunion. Which in June and July 1973, between the two 1973 Manassas tours at the start and end of the year, happened in Maui. As CSNY attempted to record an album tentatively called Human Highway. This album was never finished due to infighting. But after one final 1973 Manassas tour, during which CSN and CSNY reunited during the acoustic sections both at Winterland Arena concerts, a reunion was in the cards, and Manassas was over. Stills then sold his Surrey home and relocated to Colorado. The last date of the first 1973 Manassas tour was recorded for ABC In Concert. Cashbox magazine ranked Manassas as the number 58 group of 1973. Billboard ranked Down The Road as the number 36 of new album artists.

In 1973, Stills left the services of David Geffen and set up his own publishing company with Ken Weiss, called Gold Hill Publishing, named after his home in Boulder, Colorado.

=== Solo and CSNY tours (1974) ===
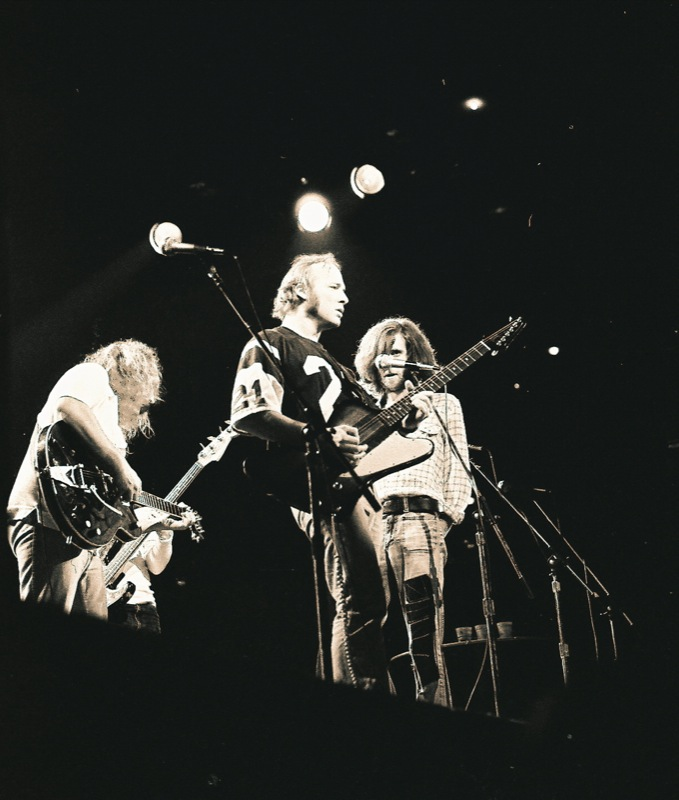
Crosby, Stills, Nash & Young, August 1974

Stills spent early 1974 on a sold out East coast tour where he played well respected theatres, including Carnegie Hall. The 1975 live album Stephen Stills Live was made up of recordings from this tour. It was also during this tour that Stills announced the 1974 CSNY reunion concert tour. The CSNY reunion tour sold-out shows through July and August in both the US and the UK, with an average concert attendance of 80,000. Due to poor management, the tour made little money for the group, but album sales saw a boost: the CSNY compilation album So Far reached number 1 in the US and sold 6 million copies. After another aborted attempt at recording a CSNY album after the tour, Stills signed with Columbia Records in late 1974. In 1973–1974, Stills was recording another solo album called As I Come of Age, which was put aside for the CSNY reunion tour. Many songs were used for the 1975 Stills album. In 1974, Stills played bass on, and helped mix his wife's record Le Maudit. He also played bass for her at two concerts in Paris in October 1974.

=== Signing to Columbia Records and The Stills Young Band (1975–1976) ===
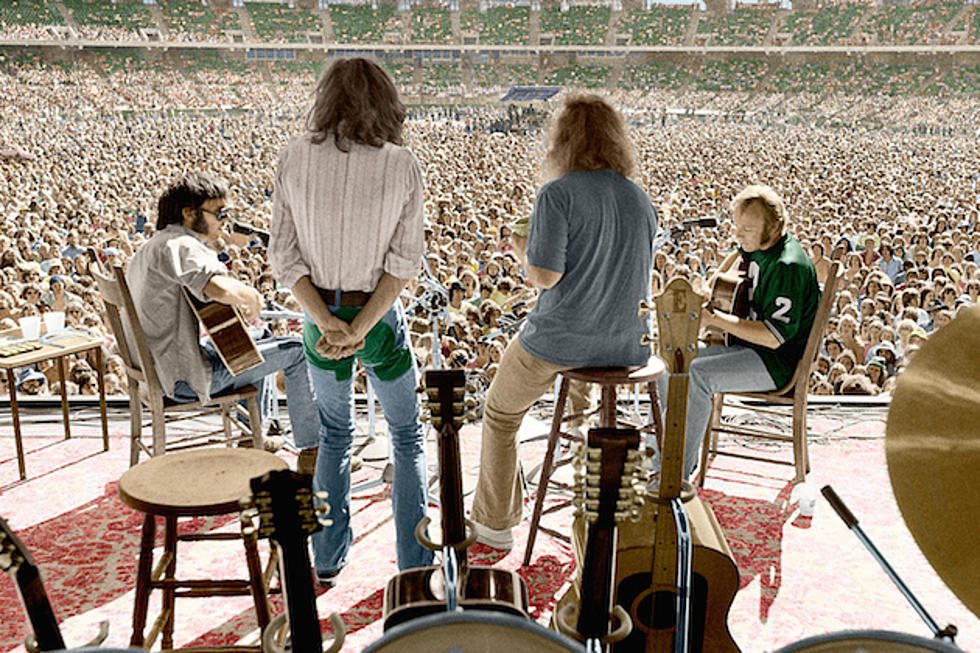
Stills (far right) performing in 1974 with Crosby, Stills, Nash and Young.

Stills signed to Columbia Records for three albums: Stills in 1975, Illegal Stills in 1976; and Thoroughfare Gap in 1978. Stills released in June 1975, was the highest-charting release of the three at number 22 on the US charts, and also the most critically successful of the three. Stills then spent the rest of year touring the US, doing a summer and winter tour playing to 10,000 seat arenas, including the LA Forum, and Red Rocks Amphitheatre. Stills played an acoustic set at the Bob Dylan-organised Night of the Hurricane Benefit at the Houston Astrodome in January 1976. He next released Illegal Stills in May 1976, which reached number 31 on the US charts, but was not critically well received, nor produced any charting singles. Around this time Stills played percussion on the Bee Gees' song "You Should Be Dancing" and wrote an unreleased song with Barry Gibb. In retrospect Stills has commented on his mid-70s solo period saying he "short-circuited for a while, things were moving too fast. I got a little crazed. Too much drinking, too many drugs. What can I say." Cashbox magazine ranked Stills as the number 29 top male vocalist of 1975.

In 1976 after the release of Illegal Stills, Stills attempted a reunion with Neil Young. At one point, Long May You Run was slated to be a CSNY record, but when Crosby and Nash left to fulfill recording and touring obligations, they returned to find the other pair had wiped their vocals from the recordings, as Stills and Young decided to go on without them as the Stills–Young Band. However, Young would leave midway through the resulting tour due to an apparent throat infection. Stills was contractually bound to finish the tour, which he did for three dates before it was cancelled with Chris Hillman helping him, but upon returning home, his wife announced she wanted a divorce and wished to move back to France, although they temporarily reunited.

Stills went out on tour in November 1976 as a three-piece: Stills on guitar, vocals, and piano; George Perry on bass; and Joe Vitale on drums. He reunited with Crosby and Nash shortly afterwards, thanks to the efforts of Nash's future wife Susan, who got Nash to forgive Stills for wiping the Crosby and Nash vocals from Long May You Run. Not before Atlantic Records released a compilation album from Stills first two solo albums, and the two Manassas albums in December 1976 called Still Stills: The Best Of Stephen Stills. Cashbox magazine ranked Stills at number 27 for the top male vocalist of 1976, and Stills and Young as the number 6 duo, number 3 new duo, and number 20 best new artist of 1976. Stills, as Gold Hill Publishing, was having hits publishing for the band Firefall and Joey Stec during this time, so much so that Billboard ranked him as the number 97 publisher of 1976.

=== CSN reunion and solo years (1977–1979) ===
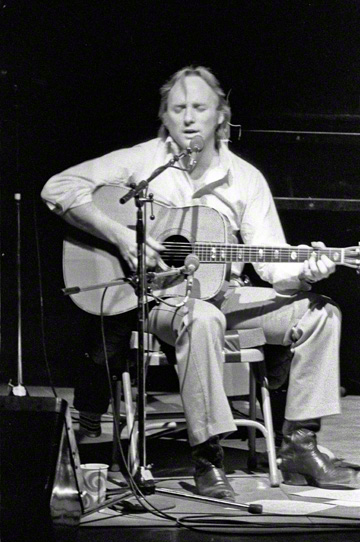
Stephen Stills 1978 by Mitchell Weinstock

Stills's performances with Crosby and Nash in late 1976 and early 1977 led to the permanent reunion of Crosby, Stills, and Nash. They released the CSN album in 1977 and unsuccessfully attempted another album in 1978. The band toured major arenas including Madison Square Garden and the LA Forum in 1977 and 1978, and during the 1977 tour they visited President Jimmy Carter in the White House. Stills released his final album on Columbia Records entitled Thoroughfare Gap in October 1978. It was comparatively unsuccessful and reached number 84 on the US charts. In 1977 and 1978, Stills played only one solo engagement, at the Bread and Roses Festival in 1978.

After a four-day residency at the Roxy in January 1979 with original CSN bandmate Dallas Taylor on drums, Stills spent most of 1979 on tour in the US playing with his California Blues Band. One of these dates in early 1979 included a trip to Cuba to participate in the Havana Jam festival that took place between March 2 and 4, alongside Weather Report, the Trio of Doom, Fania All-Stars, Billy Swan, Bonnie Bramlett, Mike Finnigan, Kris Kristofferson, Rita Coolidge and Billy Joel, as well as an array of Cuban artists such as Irakere, with whom he toured the US after the Havana concerts. His performance is captured on Ernesto Juan Castellanos's documentary Havana Jam '79.

In 1979, Stills recorded one of the first entirely digital albums; however, it remains unreleased, as the record company did not feel it was commercial enough. The songs recorded for this album include "Spanish Suite" and "Cuba al Fin" and the 1982 CSN hit "Southern Cross". The album was produced by Barry Beckett and was slated for release in 1979 or 1980.

CSN played only two dates in 1979, both at Madison Square Garden for Musicians United for Safe Energy. Their performance was released on The Muse Concerts for a Non-Nuclear Future.

In 1979, Stills's wife filed for divorce, which was finalized on July 12, 1980.

=== 1980s ===
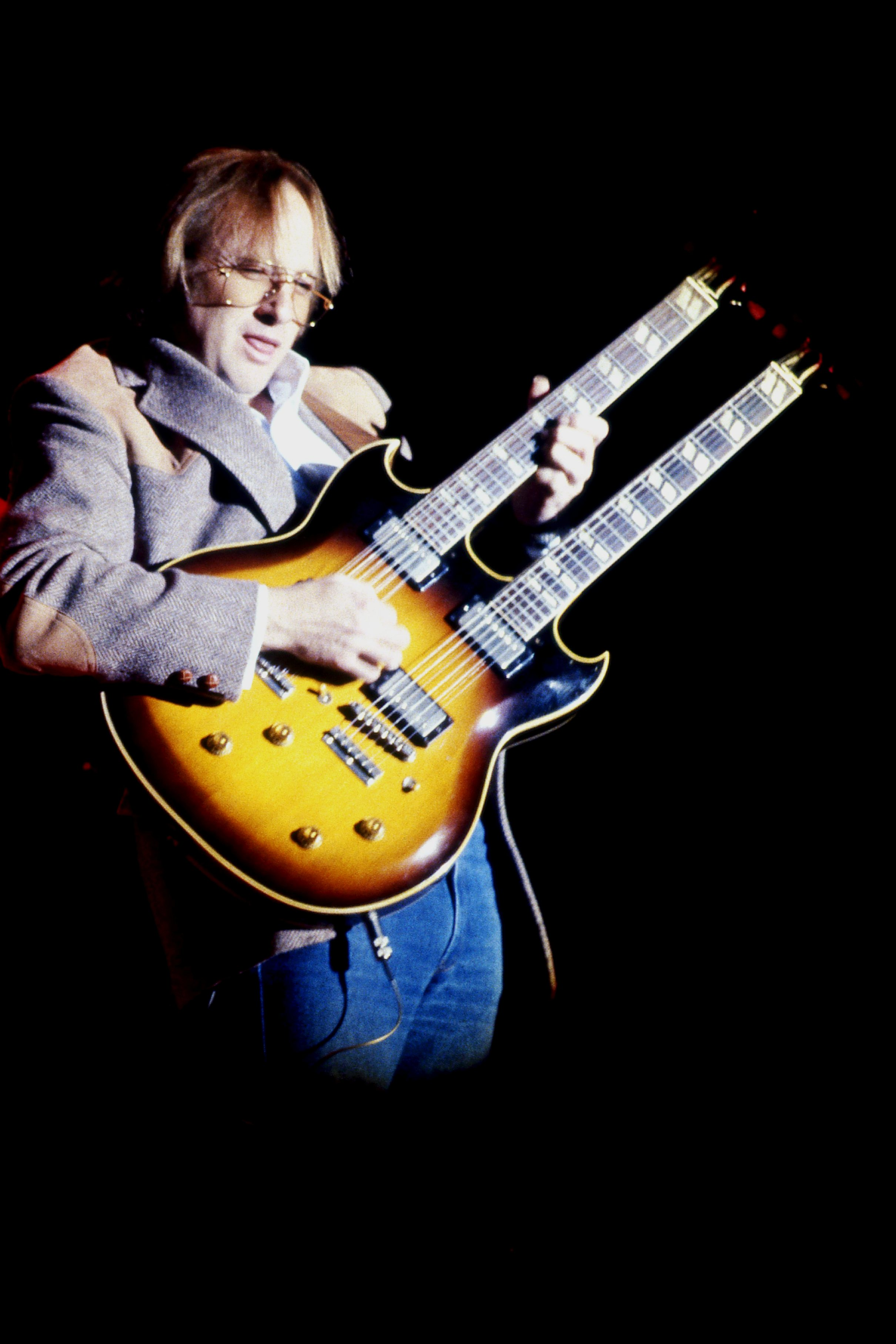
Stills performance in Essen, West Germany, on June 17, 1983

After playing some European dates in 1980, and with Graham Nash joining him for the German dates supporting Angelo Branduardi, Stills and Nash decided to record a duo album together. The record company refused to release this album without David Crosby, so they added him and CSN's Daylight Again was released in 1982, reaching number 8 in the US and was certified Platinum. The album featured the top twenty hit "Southern Cross". In 1983, the CSN live album Allies, was released featuring Stills's number 45 hit song "War Games". CSN toured yearly from 1982 to 1989, except during 1986, due to David Crosby's prison sentence.

In 1984, Stills released his first solo album in six years, Right by You on Atlantic Records. This would be the final Stills album to make the Billboard 200 album chart and featured Jimmy Page on guitar. It was his last solo release on a major label.

In 1985, CSN and CSNY played Live Aid.

In 1988, CSNY reunited for the album American Dream, which reached number 12 on the US charts and was certified platinum in the US. However no tour was taken in support of the album.

=== 1990s ===
In 1990, CSN released the album Live It Up, their first not to be certified in the US since their debut.

Stills toured with CSN, in 1990, 1994, 1996, 1997 and 1999.

Having spent most of 1990 playing acoustic with CSN and solo he released the solo album Stills Alone in 1991, with the aim of releasing a solo electric album in 1992. However this solo electric album was never released.

In 1994, CSN released the album After the Storm.

From 1993 to 1995, Stills part owned a restaurant in New Orleans, called Toucan Du. He married his third wife, Kristen Hathaway, on May 27, 1996.

In 1997, Stills became the first person to be inducted into the Rock and Roll Hall of Fame twice on the same night for his work with CSN and Buffalo Springfield. Fender Guitars Custom Shop crafted a guitar and presented it to Stills to commemorate the occasion, a Telecaster 1953 reissue guitar serial R2674 bearing an inscription on the neck plate; "Stephen Stills R & R Hall of Fame May 6, 1997 "

In 1999, CSNY reunited to release the album Looking Forward; it reached number 26 on the US charts. Stills co-wrote (with Joe Vitale) "Faith in Me," which was recorded in Ga Ga's Room in Los Angeles, and which he also sang. He also wrote and sang "Seen Enough," recorded at Conway Recording Studios in Hollywood, and "No Tears Left," which was recorded with many other album tracks at Neil Young's facility, Redwood Digital, in Woodside, California. Looking Forward was the eighth and final studio album by Crosby, Stills & Nash, and their third and final with Neil Young.

=== 2000s ===
This CSNY reunion resulted in CSNY reunion tours 2000 CSNY2K, 2002 and 2006 reunion tours, their first since 1974. The CSNY2K tour of the United States and Canada with the reformed super quartet earned $42.1 million, making it the eighth largest grossing tour of 2000. The 2006 CSNY tour was the Freedom of Speech tour, which was released on the album Deja Vu Live. Stills also toured with CSN in 2003, 2005, 2007, 2008 and 2009. The 2005 tour supported their Gold certified album Greatest Hits, their 2009 tour supported the CSN demos album Demos.

2005 saw Stills release Man Alive!, his first solo offering in 14 years. Man Alive! was released on the small English independent folk rock label Talking Elephant, and was not widely reviewed. The record did not chart on either side of the Atlantic, and was received lukewarmly by the few critics who did review it. It featured songs dating from the 1970s to the present, including "Spanish Suite", originally recorded in the late 70s with Herbie Hancock.

Throughout 2006 and 2007, Stills toured regularly as a solo artist with "the Quartet", which consisted of drummer Joe Vitale, either Mike Finnigan or session player Todd Caldwell on keyboards, and either Kevin McCormick or Kenny Passarelli on bass. On May 28, 2007, Stills sang the national anthem for Game 1 of the 2007 Stanley Cup Finals between the Anaheim Ducks and Ottawa Senators in Anaheim, California. On December 17, 2007, Graham Nash revealed on Larry King Live that Stills had been diagnosed with early stage prostate cancer and that his operation would take place on January 3, 2008, which is Stills's birthday. Stills said later in January 2008 that he had come through the operation with "flying colors."

In 2007 he released Just Roll Tape, a recently found tape of Stills singing demos of his unreleased songs in 1968 after the breakup of the Buffalo Springfield, during the last hour of a Judy Collins session.

Stills toured Europe as a solo artist for the first time during October 2008, resulted in the release of the 2009 live album and video Live at Shepherds Bush, recorded in London, England.

Also in 2009, he released his second archival release Pieces by Manassas, a selection of alternate takes and unreleased songs of Stills band recorded between 1971 and 1973. This was supposed to be the start in a series of archival releases, however none have appeared since.

=== Later years ===
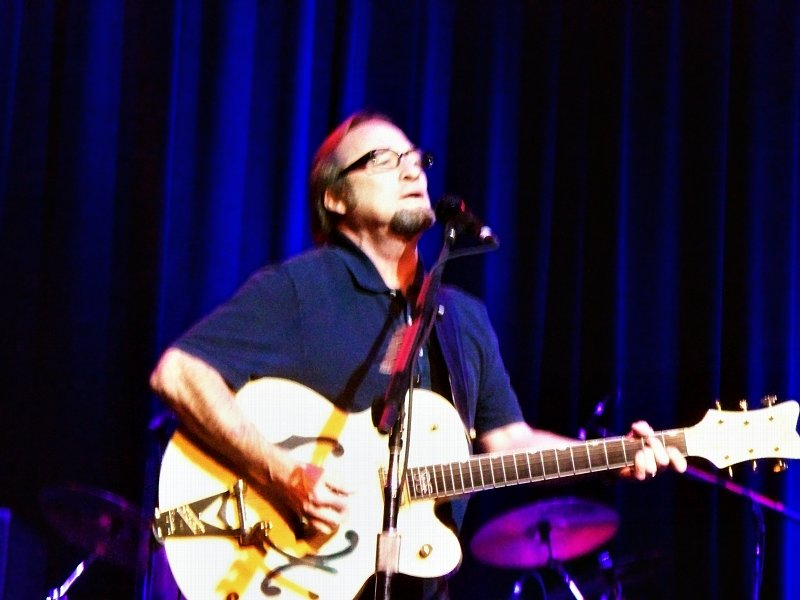
Stills in Boston 2011

Stills toured with CSN in 2010, 2012, 2014, 2015. The 2012 tour resulted in the release CSN 2012.

In 2011, Stills contributed a song, "Low Barefoot Tolerance," to the soundtrack of a documentary produced by J. Ralph, Wretches & Jabberers.

Also in 2010, Stills reunited with Neil Young and Richie Furay to reform Buffalo Springfield with Young for the Bridge School Benefit 2010. The band also played Bonnaroo in 2011. This was supposed to be followed by a full tour in 2012 but this never materialized.

On August 27, 2013, Stills released the album, Can't Get Enough with Kenny Wayne Shepherd and Barry Goldberg as the blues band the Rides. The band toured to support this release in 2013. They released a follow-up album called Pierced Arrow in 2016, this was followed by another tour to support this release in 2016 and 2017.

On August 12, 2014, Watsky released the album All You Can Do, featuring a song with Stills, "Cannonball".

In 2016, CSN split up after over 30 years together, and in December 2016 Stills independently released a song called "Look Each Other in the Eye" on SoundCloud.

On September 22, 2017, Stills and Judy Collins released an album Everybody Knows, which entered the Billboard 200 chart at number 195 and peaked at 45. It was their first joint album and was followed by a 2017-2018 tour supporting the album.

In April 2021, Stills gave an interview indicating that he was retired. Since the pandemic, Stills returned to guest with Brandi Carlile at a tribute concert honoring Joni Mitchell, his first public performance since a benefit in December 2018. In February 2023, Stills announced his co-headlining appearance with Neil Young at a Light Up the Blues event, due to take place in April.

On January 30, 2025, Stills appeared at the FireAid benefit concert in Los Angeles where he and guitarist Mike Campbell joined Dawes on stage for a performance of "For What It's Worth". Stills and Dawes were then joined by Graham Nash and they performed "Teach Your Children". It marked the first time since 2016 that Stills and Nash have performed together.

== Personal life ==
=== Relationship with Judy Collins ===
Stills was involved with musician Judy Collins from 1968 to 1969. Their brief relationship inspired some of Stills's songs. Stills was a guitarist and session musician for Collins. He appeared on her 1968 album Who Knows Where the Time Goes and was credited as "Steven Stills". It was during these sessions that Stills recorded his demo album, Just Roll Tape on April 28, 1968 (finally released in 2007). The songs "Change Partners", "So Begins the Task", "Judy", "Helplessly Hoping" and "Suite: Judy Blue Eyes" were originally recorded as demos, with only a stripped-back acoustic guitar.

In 1969, Stills released the song "Suite: Judy Blue Eyes". When Stills first played the song alone for Collins, she recalls, "Afterwards, we both cried – and then I said: 'Oh, Stephen, it's such a beautiful song. But it's not winning me back.'" In the early 1970s, Stills recorded "So Begins the Task" about accepting rejection from Collins. About their relationship, Collins has said, "My center was in New York and his in L.A. He hated New York and he hated therapy. And I was in both."

=== Other relationships ===
Stills dated actress and singer-songwriter Nancy Priddy, who was the inspiration for the Buffalo Springfield song "Pretty Girl Why". Stills also had a short-term relationship with Rita Coolidge, as had Graham Nash, which apparently led to the initial breakup of CSNY, in 1970.

In June 1970, Stills had a daughter, Jen Stills, with an ex-girlfriend in Arizona. Jen's mother, whose identity is not publicly known, was allegedly "only 15 years old" when she gave birth, and filed a paternity suit against Stills the following year.

Stills' son Justin Stills was born in January 1971 to Harriet Tunis. Tunis filed a paternity suit against Stills, which was not settled until December 1973, when Justin was nearly three years old. Justin was critically injured while snowboarding on Mt. Charleston, just outside Las Vegas, in 1997. An episode of Discovery Health's documentary series Trauma: Life in the ER featured his treatment and recovery.

During a Manassas tour in France, Stills met his first wife, French singer-songwriter Véronique Sanson. They were married on March 14, 1973. Their son Chris Stills was born in 1974. They divorced in 1979.

On December 5, 1987, he married model Pamela Ann Jordan in Washington D.C., with whom he had a daughter, born in 1988.

His third wife is Kristen Hathaway, whom he married on May 27, 1996 and has two sons, Henry (b. 1996) and Oliver (b. 2004). Henry has been diagnosed with Asperger syndrome and is profiled in the 2007 documentary Autism: The Musical.

=== Health ===
In 1976, Stills told Rolling Stone, "My hearing has gotten to be a terrible problem. If I keep playing and touring the way I have been, I'll go deaf."

Stills has struggled with both drug addiction and alcoholism. Stills has been completely sober since 2022.

=== Politics ===
Stills has long been involved in liberal causes and politics. In 2000, he served as a member of the Democratic Party credentials committee from Florida during the Democratic National Convention, and was a delegate in previous years. Stills performed with Billy Porter during the 2020 Democratic National Convention.

In December 2018, Stills received an Honorary Doctorate in Music from the University of Florida, Gainesville, where he was a speaker at the commencement ceremony.

== Style, musicianship, and sound ==
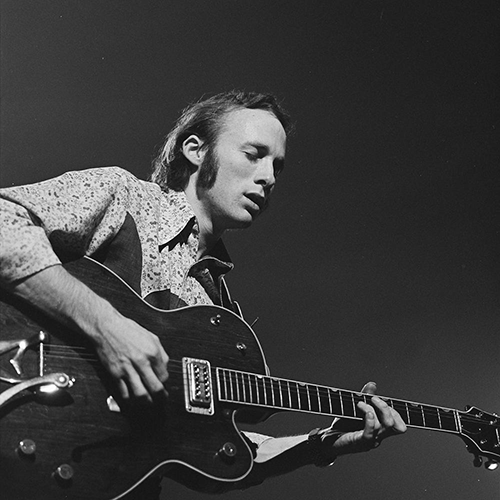
Stephen Stills, 1972

Stills is a guitarist whose music draws from myriad genres that include rock and roll, blues, gospel, country and folk music. In addition, Latin music has played a key role in both his approach to percussion and guitar and he is also a multi-instrumentalist, capable of playing keyboards, bass, percussion, congas, clavinet, electric piano, piano, organ, banjo and drums.

Stills experimented with the guitar itself, including soaking strings in barbecue sauce or flipping pickups to mimic Hendrix playing a right-handed guitar left-handed. He is also known for using alternate guitar tunings, particularly when performing acoustically. Often a long acoustic solo section of the show would showcase agile fingerstyle playing in standard and altered tunings. His primary alternate tuning is usually D A D F♯ A D, or "Palmer modal tuning which is 'E E E E B E' ", which can be heard in "Suite: Judy Blue Eyes," "Carry On," and "4 + 20."

For the CSN debut album in 1969, Graham Nash commented that "Stephen had a vision, and David and I let him run with it." Stills played every instrumental part on Crosby, Stills and Nash with the exception of some guitar by Crosby and Nash, and drums by Dallas Taylor.

== Discography ==
See also discographies for The Au Go Go Singers, Buffalo Springfield, Crosby Stills Nash & Young.

=== Albums ===
| Title | Album details | Peak chart positions | | | | | | | | | | | Certifications |
| Title | Album details | US | AUS | CAN | FR | GE | NDL | NOR | NZ | SPA | SW | UK | Certifications |
as Bloomfield/Kooper/Stills (1968)
| Super Session | Released: July 22, 1968; Label: Columbia Records | 12 | — | 15 | — | — | 18 | — | — | 25 | — | — | RIAA: Gold |
Solo (1970–1971)
| Stephen Stills | Released: November 16, 1970; Label: Atlantic Records | 3 | 8 | 7 | — | — | 5 | 12 | — | — | 3 | 8 | RIAA: Gold |
| Stephen Stills 2 | Released: June 30, 1971; Label: Atlantic Records | 8 | 19 | 11 | — | — | 2 | 7 | — | — | 5 | 22 | RIAA: Gold |
with Manassas (1972–1973)
| Manassas | Released: April 12, 1972; Label: Atlantic Records | 4 | 17 | 9 | — | 34 | 1 | 6 | — | — | 8 | 30 | RIAA: Gold |
| Down the Road | Released: April 23, 1973; Label: Atlantic Records | 26 | — | 31 | — | — | — | — | — | 19 | 18 | 33 | |
Solo (1975–1976)
| Stills | Released: June 23, 1975; Label: Columbia/CBS Records | 19 | 73 | 25 | 15 | — | — | 19 | — | — | — | 33 | |
| Stephen Stills Live (live) | Released: December 4, 1975; Label: Atlantic Records | 42 | — | 96 | — | — | — | — | — | — | — | — | |
| Illegal Stills | Released: May 1976; Label: Columbia/CBS Records | 31 | 79 | 31 | — | — | 17 | — | — | — | — | 54 | |
as Stills-Young Band (1976)
| Long May You Run | Released: September 10, 1976; Label: Reprise Records | 26 | 16 | 26 | — | — | 3 | 19 | 17 | — | — | 12 | RIAA: Gold; BPI: Silver |
Solo (1976–2007)
| Still Stills: The Best of Stephen Stills (compilation) | Released: December 2, 1976; Label: Atlantic Records | 127 | — | — | — | — | — | — | — | — | — | — | |
| Thoroughfare Gap | Released: October 31, 1978; Label: Columbia/CBS Records | 83 | — | 82 | — | — | — | — | — | — | — | — | |
| Right by You | Released: July 30, 1984; Label: Atlantic Records | 75 | — | — | — | — | — | — | — | — | — | — | |
| Stills Alone | Released: September 11, 1991; Label: Vision/Gold Hill Records | — | — | — | — | — | — | — | — | — | — | — | |
| Turnin' Back the Pages (compilation) | Released: November 4, 2003; Label: Raven Records | — | — | — | — | — | — | — | — | — | — | — | |
| Man Alive! | Released: August 9, 2005; Label: Titan/Pyramid Records | — | — | — | — | — | — | — | — | — | — | — | |
| Just Roll Tape (demo album) | Released: July 10, 2007; Label: Rhino/Eyewall | — | — | — | — | — | — | — | — | — | — | — | |
as Manassas (2009)
| Pieces (compilation) | Released: September 9, 2009; Label: Rhino Records | — | — | — | — | — | — | — | — | — | — | — | |
Solo (2009–2013)
| Live at Shepherd's Bush (live) | Released: November 2, 2009; Label: Eyewall Records | — | — | — | — | — | — | — | — | — | — | — | |
| Carry On (compilation) | Released: February 12, 2013; Label: Warner Records | — | — | — | — | — | 83 | — | — | — | — | — | |
as a member of The Rides (2013–2016)
| Can't Get Enough | Released: August 27, 2013; Label: 429 Records | 39 | — | — | — | 15 | 69 | 17 | — | — | 43 | 87 | |
| Pierced Arrow | Released: May 6, 2016; Label: Provogue Records | 152 | — | — | 161 | 35 | 91 | — | — | — | — | — | |
with Judy Collins (2017) as Stills & Collins
| Everybody Knows | Released: September 22, 2017; Label: Cleopatra Records | 195 | — | — | — | — | 178 | — | — | — | — | — | |
Solo (2017–present)
| Live at Berkeley 1971 (live) | Released: April 28, 2023; Label: Omnivore Recordings | — | — | — | — | — | — | — | — | — | — | — | |
"—" denotes releases that did not chart

=== Singles ===
| Year | Title | Peak chart positions | | | | | | | | | Album | Label |
| Year | Title | US | US AC | US Main | NDL | FIN | AUS | UK | CAN AC | CAN | Album | Label |
|---|---|---|---|---|---|---|---|---|---|---|---|---|
| 1968 | "Season of the Witch"/"Albert's Shuffle" | — | — | — | — | — | — | — | — | — | Super Session | Columbia |
| 1970 | "Love the One You're With"/"To a Flame" | 14 | 32 | — | 9 | 28 | 29 | 37 | 17 | 6 | Stephen Stills | Atlantic |
| 1971 | "Sit Yourself Down"/"We Are Not Helpless" | 37 | — | — | — | — | — | — | — | 24 | Stephen Stills | Atlantic |
| 1971 | "Change Partners"/"Relaxing Town" | 43 | — | — | 22 | — | — | — | — | 42 | Stephen Stills 2 | Atlantic |
| 1971 | "Marianne"/"Nothin' to Do but Today" | 42 | — | — | 28 | — | — | — | — | 17 | Stephen Stills 2 | Atlantic |
| 1972 | "It Doesn't Matter"/"Rock & Roll Crazies Medley" | 61 | — | — | — | — | — | — | — | 48 | Manassas | Atlantic |
| 1972 | "Rock & Roll Crazies Medley"/"Colorado" | 92 | — | — | — | — | — | — | — | — | Manassas | Atlantic |
| 1973 | "Isn't It About Time"/"So Many Times" | 56 | — | — | — | — | — | — | 52 | 77 | Down the Road | Atlantic |
| 1973 | "Down the Road" /"Guaguancó de Veró" | — | — | — | — | — | — | — | — | — | Down the Road | Atlantic |
| 1975 | "Turn Back the Pages"/"Shuffle Just as Bad" | 84 | — | — | — | — | — | — | — | — | Stills | Columbia |
| 1976 | "Buyin' Time"/"Soldier" | — | — | — | — | — | — | — | — | — | Illegal Stills | Columbia |
| 1976 | "The Loner"/"Stateline Blues" | — | — | — | — | — | — | — | — | — | Illegal Stills | Columbia |
| 1976 | "Long May You Run"/"12/8 Blues (All the Same)" | — | — | — | 18 | — | — | — | — | — | Long May You Run | Reprise |
| 1976 | "Midnight on the Bay"/"Black Coral" | 105 | — | — | — | — | — | — | — | — | Long May You Run | Reprise |
| 1978 | "Can't Get No Booty"/"Lowdown" | — | — | — | — | — | — | — | — | — | Thoroughfare Gap | Columbia |
| 1978 | "Thoroughfare Gap"/"Lowdown" | — | — | — | — | — | — | — | — | — | Thoroughfare Gap | Columbia |
| 1984 | "Stranger"/"No Hiding Place" | 61 | — | 12 | — | — | — | — | — | — | Right by You | Atlantic |
| 1984 | "Can't Let Go"/"Grey to Green" | 67 | 17 | — | — | — | — | — | — | — | Right by You | Atlantic |
| 1984 | "Only Love Can Break Your Heart"/"Love Again" | — | — | — | — | — | — | — | — | — | Right by You | Atlantic |
| 2005 | "Wounded World"/"Acadienne" | — | — | — | — | — | — | — | — | — | Man Alive! | Titan/Pyramid Records |
| 2016 | "Look Each Other in the Eye" | — | — | — | — | — | — | — | — | — | N/A | Independently released on SoundCloud |
"—" denotes releases that did not chart, "X" denotes no chart published "Stranger" also reached number 12 on the Billboard Mainstream Rock Tracks chart.

=== Other appearances ===
| Year | Song | Title |
|---|---|---|
| 2011 | "Low Barefoot Tolerance" | Wretches & Jabberers |

=== Guest appearances ===
| Year | Artist | Album/Single | Note |
|---|---|---|---|
| 1968 | Joni Mitchell | Song to a Seagull | Bass |
| 1968 | Mama Cass | Dream a Little Dream | Guitar |
| 1968 | Judy Collins | Who Knows Where the Time Goes | Electric guitar, acoustic guitar, bass |
| 1968 | Joan Baez | Any Day Now: Songs of Bob Dylan | Guitar |
| 1968 | The Monkees | Head | Guitar |
| 1968 | Richie Havens | Richard P. Havens, 1983 | Guitar |
| 1969 | Joni Mitchell | Clouds | Guitar, bass |
| 1969 | Jefferson Airplane | Volunteers | Hammond organ |
| 1970 | John Sebastian | John B. Sebastian | Lead guitar, guitar |
| 1970 | Eric Clapton | Eric Clapton | Guitar |
| 1970 | Timothy Leary | You Can Be Anyone This Time Around | Guitar |
| 1970 | Joni Mitchell | Ladies of The Canyon | Vocals |
| 1970 | Doris Troy | Doris Troy | Guitar |
| 1970 | Neil Young | After the Gold Rush | Vocals |
| 1971 | Rita Coolidge | Rita Coolidge | Guitar, acoustic guitar |
| 1971 | Jimi Hendrix | The Cry of Love | Piano |
| 1971 | Bill Withers | Just as I Am | Guitar |
| 1971 | Joni Mitchell | Blue | Guitar, bass |
| 1972 | Neil Young | Harvest | Backing vocals |
| 1972 | Humble Pie | Smokin' | Organ, backing vocals |
| 1972 | Mickey Hart | Rolling Thunder | Bass, mixing |
| 1972 | Joni Mitchell | For the Roses | Rock 'n' roll band |
| 1972 | Neil Young | Journey Through the Past | |
| 1973 | Graham Nash | Wild Tales | Played guitar and electric piano under the moniker "Harry Halex" |
| 1974 | Veronique Sanson | Le Maudit | Bass, mixing |
| 1974 | Elvin Bishop | Juke Joint Jump | Guitar |
| 1975 | The Rolling Stones | Metamorphosis | Said to have played guitar on "I'm Going Down" |
| 1975 | Neil Young | Zuma | Bass, backing vocals |
| 1976 | Bee Gees | Children of the World | Percussion on 'You Should Be Dancing' |
| 1977 | Bee Gees | Saturday Night Fever | Percussion on 'You Should Be Dancing' |
| 1977 | Dave Mason | Let It Flow | Harmony vocals |
| 1978 | Dave Mason | Mariposa de Oro | Backing vocals |
| 1979 | Hoyt Axton | A Rusty Halo | Guitar |
| 1979 | Various artists | Havana Jam | Live album contributes song – "Cuba Al Fin" |
| 1980 | Graham Nash | Earth & Sky | Rhythm guitar |
| 1981 | Joe Vitale | Plantation Harbor | Vocals |
| 1981 | Michael Schenker Group | MSG | Backing vocals |
| 1981 | Ringo Starr | Stop and Smell the Roses | Lead guitar, vocals, producer |
| 1982 | Firefall | Break of Dawn | Electric guitar, piano, Vocals |
| 1982 | Bernard Swell | Priez Pour Moi | Guitar |
| 1985 | Yuko Ishikawa (石川優子) | Ren-Ai-Kodoku-Nin (恋愛孤独人) | Guitar |
| 1986 | Steve Alaimo | Steve Alaimo | Guitar |
| 1997 | Jimi Hendrix | First Rays of the New Rising Sun | Piano |
| 1998 | Public Enemy | He Got Game | Vocals, guitar |
| 1999 | The Jimmy Rodgers All Stars | Blues Blues Blues | Vocals, guitar |
| 2006 | Richie Furay | Heartbeat of Love | Harmony vocals |
| 2010 | Al Jardine | A Postcard from California | Backing vocals |
| 2012 | Neil Young and Crazy Horse | Americana | Guitar, vocals |
| 2013 | Jimi Hendrix | People, Hell and Angels | Bass guitar |
| 2014 | Watsky | All You Can Do | Vocals on "Cannonball" |
| 2018 | Jimi Hendrix | Both Sides of the Sky | Songwriter of "20$ Fine", organ, vocals |

=== Filmography and TV appearances ===
| Year | Film/TV | Notes |
|---|---|---|
| 1969 | The Dick Cavett Show | Played 4+20 |
| 1969 | Supershow | Played Black Queen |
| 1971 | Pop 2 | French TV show |
| 1971 | Beat-Workshop | German TV show |
| 1972 | Sounding Out | British documentary |
| 1972 | The Old Grey Whistle Test | Live footage of Go Back Home from Madison Square Garden 1971 |
| 1972 | Beat Club | With Manassas |
| 1972 | TopPop | With Manassas, Dutch TV show |
| 1972 | BBC In Concert | With Manassas |
| 1972 | | With Manassas, Australia TV show for Mulwala Festival |
| 1973 | ABC In Concert | With Manassas |
| 1973 | Journey Through the Past | Directed by Neil Young |
| 1980 | Going Platinum | American TV show, Interviewed by Jim Ladd |
| 1983 | Na Sowas! | |
| 1983 | Salute! | With Larry Gatlin and The Gatlin Brothers |
| 1984 | American Bandstand | |

== Tours ==
- Memphis Horns Tour 1971
- Manassas World Tour 1972
- Manassas North American Tour 1973
- 1974 Theater Tour
- 1975 Tour
- The Stills–Young Band Tour
- 1976 Tour
- 1979 California Blues Band Tour
