= The Au Go Go Singers =

American folk group

- Origin: Greenwich Village, New York City
- Genres: Folk
- Years active: 1964–1965
- Labels: Roulette
- Past members: Stephen Stills; Richie Furay; Roy Michaels; Mike Scott; Fred Geiger; Jean Gurney; Kathy King; Bob Harmelink; Nels Gustafson

The Au Go Go Singers were a nine-member folk group formed in New York City in 1964, and best remembered for featuring Stephen Stills and Richie Furay two years before they formed Buffalo Springfield.

== Career ==
Stills and Furay met while performing in folk clubs in Greenwich Village, alongside Furay's former college classmates Bob Harmelink and Nels Gustafson. They were seen by songwriter Ed E. Miller, the credited co-writer of the Serendipity Singers' hit "Don't Let the Rain Come Down". In early 1964, Miller was preparing a revue, America Sings, which chronicled the history of folk music in America, and suggested that the four, together with an existing group, the Bay Singers – Roy Michaels, Mike Scott, Fred Geiger and Jean Gurney – and Kathy King (Kathrin King Segal), provide the music in the show. Although the show only ran for two weeks, Miller secured a contract with Roulette Records for the nine-strong group to record an album, which they did with producers Hugo Peretti and Luigi Creatore. After seeing the show, club owner Howard Solomon signed the group for a residency at his Cafe au Go Go nightclub on Bleecker Street.

By the time the LP was released in late 1964, the ensemble had become known as the Au Go Go Singers. As well as appearing at the club, they made TV appearances, and performed at other venues. Their album, They Call Us Au Go-Go Singers, featured Stills' lead vocals on Billy Edd Wheeler's song "High Flying Bird", and Furay singing Tom Paxton's "Where I'm Bound". The album overall is described at Allmusic as "predictably bland, professional and well executed group hootenanny folk music". The album also included songs by Jesse Fuller, John Stewart, and Lee Hays. A single, "San Francisco Bay Blues"/ "Pink Polemoniums", was released from the album.

Following a dispute with Solomon, the group's management was taken over by Jim Friedman and they continued to perform, but found that their contract with Morris Levy at Roulette meant that some venues were unwilling to book them, and they also found that, after the British Invasion, their style of music was rapidly becoming unfashionable. A second album never appeared; some members received draft notices; and Kathy King, who suffered from stage fright, decided to leave. In 1965, the group disbanded. Stills then joined the four members of the Bay Singers – Michaels, Scott, Geiger, and Gurney – and, renamed The Company, toured in Ontario. During the tour, Stills met Neil Young, when the Company were on the same bill as Young's band, the Squires. The following year, Stills, Young and Furay formed Buffalo Springfield in Los Angeles.

Of the other members of the Au Go Go Singers, Roy Michaels later formed Cat Mother & the All Night Newsboys, whose first album was produced by Jimi Hendrix. Kathy King worked as a backup singer with Bobby Vinton before working in the Broadway show Oh! Calcutta! and other theatre and cabaret shows under the name Kathrin King Segal.

The album They Call Us Au Go-Go Singers was issued on CD by Rhino Records in 1999.

== Discography ==
=== They Call Us Au Go-Go Singers ===
They Call Us The Au Go-Go Singers

Studio album by The Au Go-Go Singers
- Released: November 1964
- Genre: Folk
- Length: 28:08
- Label: Roulette Records

They Call Us Au Go-Go Singers is the only studio album by the group. The album was released in November 1964 on Roulette records, and was released in the UK on Columbia records. The album features some of the earliest recordings of future Buffalo Springfield members, Stephen Stills and Richie Furay, two years before they formed Buffalo Springfield.

The album overall is described at Allmusic as "predictably bland, professional and well executed group hootenanny folk music".

==== Track listing ====
Side one
No.	Title	Writer(s)	Length
1.	"San Francisco Bay Blues"	Jesse Fuller	2:07
2.	"What If"	Ed Miller, "Fischoff", "Fox"	3:11
3.	"Gotta Travel On"	Paul Clayton, Larry Ehrlich, David Lazar, "Fox"	2:30
4.	"Pink Polemoniums"	Al Hoffman, Richard Manning	2:04
5.	"You Are There"	Colicchio/Foster/Braselle	2:06
6.	"Oh Joe Hannah"	John Stewart	2:02

Side two
No.	Title	Writer(s)	Length
1.	"Miss Nellie"	Ed E. Miller, Bert Carroll	1:59
2.	"High Flying Bird"	Billy Wheeler	2:33
3.	"What Have They Done to the Rain"	Malvina Reynolds	2:33
4.	"Lonesome Traveller"	Lee Hays	2:21
5.	"Where I'm Bound"	Tom Paxton	2:50
6.	"This Train"	Arr. by Bert Carroll	2:06
Total length:			28:08

==== Personnel ====
- Stephen Stills - Guitar, Vocals, Lead Vocals on "High Flying Bird"
- Richie Furay - Guitar, Vocals, Lead Vocals on "Where I'm Bound"
- Kathy King - Vocals
- Jean Gurney - Vocals
- Fred Geiger - Guitar, Vocals
- Bob Harmelink - Vocals
- Roy Michaels - Guitar, Vocals
- Mike Scott - Double bass, Vocals
- Nels Gustafson - Guitar, Vocals
