= Right by You =

Studio album by Stephen Stills
- Released: July 30, 1984
- Studios: Sol Studios (Berkshire, England, UK); DB Sounds and Criteria Studios (Miami, Florida); Westlake Audio (Los Angeles, California).
- Genre: Rock
- Length: 37:46
- Label: Atlantic
- Producers: Stephen Stills, The Albert Brothers

Stephen Stills chronology
| Thoroughfare Gap (1978) | Right by You (1984) | Stills Alone (1991) |

Singles from Stephen Stills
- 1. ""Stranger" / "No Hiding Place"" Released: 1984; 2. ""Can't Let Go"/"Grey to Green"" Released: 1984; 3. ""Only Love Can Break Your Heart"/"Love Again"" Released: 1984

Professional ratings
Review scores
| Source | Rating |
|---|---|
| AllMusic | 2/5 stars |

Right by You is the sixth album by American singer-songwriter Stephen Stills, released in 1984. This is his last solo recording released on a major label, and was a critical and commercial failure peaking at number 75 on the US charts. It was also his only solo album of the 1980s.

== Background and recording ==
In 1984, Stills re-signed with Atlantic Records to make a solo album, in which Stills embraced the 80s production sounds. Jimmy Page guested on a few tracks. It was recorded at DB Sounds, Miami, Criteria Studios, Miami, Westlake Audio, Los Angeles and Sol Studios, Berkshire, which was Jimmy Page's home studio. A music video was made for the song "Stranger." It involved Stills driving around in a speedboat, which was also pictured on the back cover of the album with Stills and Tony Garcia, the speedboat racing world champion.

== Release ==
The album charted at number 75 on the Billboard charts, and three singles were released: "Stranger", "Can't Let Go", and his cover of Neil Young's "Only Love Can Break Your Heart," of which only the first two charted at numbers 61 and 67 respectively.

== Track listing ==
All tracks are written by Stephen Stills except where noted.

Side one
| No. | Title | Writer(s) | Length |
|---|---|---|---|
| 1. | "50/50" | Joe Lala, Stills | 4:22 |
| 2. | "Stranger" | Stills, Christopher Stills | 2:57 |
| 3. | "Flaming Heart" | Ray Arnott | 3:19 |
| 4. | "Love Again" | | 3:47 |
| 5. | "No Problem" | | 4:13 |

Side two
| No. | Title | Writer(s) | Length |
|---|---|---|---|
| 6. | "Can't Let Go" | Joe Esposito, Ali Willis | 4:09 |
| 7. | "Grey to Green" | Stills, James Newton Howard | 3:11 |
| 8. | "Only Love Can Break Your Heart" | Neil Young, additional lyrics Stephen Stills | 3:08 |
| 9. | "No Hiding Place" | Louise Cirtain, Gladys Stacey, A. P. Carter, additional lyrics Stephen Stills | 3:58 |
| 10. | "Right by You" | | 5:04 |
| Total length: | | | 37:46 |

== Charts ==
Album

Chart performance for Right By You
| Chart (1984) | Peak position |
|---|---|
| US Billboard Top LPs & Tape | 75 |
| US Cash Box Top 100 Albums | 92 |

Singles

Sales chart performance for singles from Right By You
| Year | Single | Chart | Position |
|---|---|---|---|
| 1984 | "Stranger" | US Billboard Hot 100 | 61 |
| 1984 | "Stranger" | US Billboard Mainstream Rock | 12 |
| 1984 | "Stranger" | US Top Singles (Cash Box) | 63 |
| 1984 | "Can't Let Go" | US Billboard Hot 100 | 67 |
| 1984 | "Can't Let Go" | US Adult Contemporary (Billboard) | 17 |
| 1984 | "Can't Let Go" | US Top Singles (Cash Box) | 77 |

== Personnel ==
- Stephen Stills – vocals, drums (1, 2, 4, 5), percussion (1, 2, 4, 5), keyboards (2, 4, 5, 7), guitars (2, 3, 4, 6, 7, 9, 10), bass (3, 4, 5, 8), bass solo (5), backing vocals (6), arrangements
- Lawrence Dermer – keyboards (1, 2, 4–8) bass (6), arrangements
- Mike Finnigan – keyboards (1, 2, 5–7, 8), backing vocals (1, 2, 4–9) organ (10), arrangements
- Kim Bullard – keyboards (2, 7)
- Jimmy Page – guitars (1, 3, 10)
- Bernie Leadon – guitars (3, 9), vocals (9)
- Herb Pedersen – banjo (9), backing vocals (9)
- Chris Hillman – mandolin (9), backing vocals (9)
- George "Chocolate" Perry – bass (1, 2, 5, 7, 10), guitars (4)
- Jerry Scheff – bass (9)
- Joe Galdo – drums (1–8, 10), percussion (1, 2, 4, 5), arrangements
- Joe Lala – percussion (1, 2, 5), drums (2, 5), cardboard box (9)
- John Kricker – trombone (1)
- Tony Concepcion – trumpet (1)
- Al De Gooyer – trumpet (1)
- Graham Nash – backing vocals (1, 2, 7, 8, 9)
- Johnne Sambataro – backing vocals (1, 2, 4, 6)

== Production ==
- Richard Wendell – executive producer
- Stephen Stills – producer
- Howard Albert – producer, recording, mixing
- Ron Albert – producer, recording, mixing
- Steve Alaimo – associate producer, producer (6)
- Ric Butz – engineer
- Mark Draeb – engineer
- Stuart Epps – engineer
- Bruce Hensal – engineer
- Mike Fuller – mastering at Criteria Studios
- Doug Morris – production advisor
- Larry "Rocky" Williams – art direction, cover design, painting, back cover photography
- Alton Kelly – cover design, painting

The album was dedicated to Felix Pappalardi, Marvin Gaye, Dennis Wilson and J. C. Agajanian.
