= Pieces (Manassas album) =

Compilation album by Stephen Stills, Manassas
- Released: September 9, 2009
- Recorded: 1971–1973, 1975
- Studios: Criteria Studios, Miami, Caribou Ranch, Colorado, The Record Plant, Los Angeles, Stills English Home in Surrey
- Length: 43:00
- Label: Rhino
- Producers: The Albert Brothers, Stephen Stills

Stephen Stills chronology
Just Roll Tape (2007)	Pieces (2009)	Live at Shepherd's Bush (2009)

Manassas chronology
Down the Road (1973)	Pieces (2009)

Professional ratings
Review scores
Source	Rating
Allmusic	4/5 stars
Goldmine	3/5 stars

Pieces is a compilation of alternate takes and outtakes from Stephen Stills’s band Manassas's two albums, 1972’s Manassas and 1973’s Down the Road. Released in 2009.

== Background ==
"This is the first in a series of retrospective recordings that Stills plans to issue, among them a box set, a live set, and (in association with Experience Hendrix) an album of studio session demos he recorded with Jimi Hendrix, his then guitar teacher (Hendrix appeared on Stills' debut solo effort), as well as a live compilation." The songs were recorded from late 1971-1973, during rehearsals at Stills' English mansion, Criteria Studios, and in Colorado, with the exception of 'My Love Is a Gentle Thing' which was recorded in 1975.

== Songs ==
"Witching Hour" - Left off the debut, but later rerecorded for Chris Hillman's first solo album.

"Sugar Babe" - A rehearsal of the song that would become a staple of the band's live shows.

"Lies" - The original version of the song recorded in Criteria Studios, Miami, with Joe Walsh guesting on guitar.

"My Love Is a Gentle Thing" - Stills' love song to his beloved Hawaiian Islands; alone and overdubbed in the middle of 1975 at Criteria.

"Like a Fox" - Uncompleted song, Bonnie Raitt turned up to sing the chorus.

"Word Game" - Electric version recorded during a Manassas rehearsal.

"Tan Sola y Triste" - A lyric-less jam for the second album, that turned into "Pensamiento".

"Fit to Be Tied" - Later reworked and rerecorded as "Shuffle Just as Bad" for the 1975 Stills album.

"Love and Satisfy" - Originally recorded for Down the Road, but left off at the last minute. Later remade for The Souther-Hillman-Furay Band.

"High and Dry" - A slow blues jam - based on a riff from Ray Charles' version of Doc Pomus' "Lonely Avenue" - was often jammed and recorded as a warm up. The live audience sound heard here was added as a studio experiment.

"Panhandle Rag" - Stills and the Burrito Boys, jamming during the first week in Miami. Joe Lala is playing the tempo on a box, Bryon Berline is playing fiddle, and Chris Hillman is playing mandolin.

"Uncle Pen" - Byron Berline sings this Bill Monroe tune, with Stills flat-picking guitar and Chris Hillman playing Mandolin.

"Do You Remember the Americans" - Earlier version than released, with Al Perkins bluegrass banjo to the fore.

"Dim Lights, Thick Smoke, (And Loud, Loud Music)" - Another one the Burritos had been playing live.

"I Am My Brother" - Stills playing alone.

== Track listing ==
All tracks are written by Stephen Stills, except where noted.

No.	Title	Writer(s)	Length
1.	"Witching Hour"		5:12
2.	"Sugar Babe"		4:19
3.	"Lies"	Chris Hillman	3:07
4.	"My Love Is a Gentle Thing"		1:23
5.	"Like a Fox"		2:58
6.	"Word Game"		1:35
7.	"Tan Sola y Triste"	Stills, Nelson Escoto	1:23
8.	"Fit to Be Tied"		3:49
9.	"Love and Satisfy"	Chris Hillman	1:57
10.	"High and Dry"		5:52
11.	"Panhandle Rag"	Leon McAuliffe	1:58
12.	"Uncle Pen"	Bill Monroe	1:53
13.	"Do You Remember the Americans"		1:49
14.	"Dim Lights, Thick Smoke (And Loud, Loud Music)"	Joe Maphis, Max Fidler, Rose Lee Maphis	2:16
15.	"I Am My Brother"		1:34
Total length:			43:00
