= Thoroughfare Gap =

Studio album by Stephen Stills
- Released: October 31, 1978
- Recorded: June 1978
- Studios: Criteria (Miami, Florida); Record Plant (Los Angeles, California); Record Plant (Sausalito, California)
- Genres: Rock, disco
- Length: 35:32
- Label: Columbia
- Producers: Stephen Stills, The Albert Brothers

Stephen Stills chronology
Still Stills: The Best of Stephen Stills (1976)	Thoroughfare Gap (1978)	Right by You (1984)

Singles from Thoroughfare Gap
- 1. "Can't Get No Booty / Lowdown" Released: September 9, 1978; 2. "Thoroughfare Gap / Lowdown" Released: December 30, 1978

Thoroughfare Gap is the fifth studio album by American singer-songwriter Stephen Stills, released in 1978. It was a critical and commercial disappointment that only charted at number 84 in the US. This album is now available as a three-album set on two CDs with Stills & Illegal Stills, having never been released on its own on CD.

== Content ==
In a radio interview at the time, Stills said he worked extremely hard on the album, and there were 12-inch mixes of "Can't Get No Booty" ready to be released. He recorded some disco tracks after playing percussion on the Bee Gees' "You Should Be Dancing", and subsequently hired their arranger Mike Lewis and used the group members' younger brother Andy Gibb on backing vocals.

Stephen Stills described the record as "disco and swamp rock". Stills said the song "Thoroughfare Gap" was him drawing upon his history, and

the title of the album was named after an escape route used during the Civil War. Mosby's guerrillas used to run through Thoroughfare Gap when they felt harassed. They'd just disappear into the Blue Ridge Mountains. For me, the record represents a little gap between one part of my career and the other, a cut in the pass.

George Terry is quoted as saying he thinks it's about Neil Young's Lionel Trains.

Stills said about the perceived negative reception of going disco that "there are elements of disco I like - the percussion and the guitar. I have played on so many Bee Gees songs: I don't know which ones I played on and which ones I didn't. 'Cause Barry (Gibb) is an old friend of mine and I just sat in and played a chickum-chit, chickum-chit, a little wacka-wacka guitar, then said, 'Use 'em or don't use 'em, I had a great time. You don't even have to use my name.'"

He continued on Thoroughfare Gap: "Maybe some of the tunes weren't as good as others I've written but I am just messing around trying to find something new. I can't do the same thing for eight years. That's called artistic suicide."

Stills said he recorded "Not Fade Away" after seeing The Buddy Holly Story and went into the studio the next night to record it - "Kind of a combination of the Stones version and the original version".

The song "Thoroughfare Gap", dates back to 1972, with Chris Hillman remembering Manassas attempting to record it, but not being able to get the right take.

== Reception ==
Professional ratings
Review scores
Source	Rating
AllMusic	1.5/5 stars

Critical reception was mixed, but generally negative. In a contemporary review, People wrote that "Stills succeeds handsomely in soldering his Southern Cal rock (scorching guitar, lavish harmonies, introspective lyrics) to an ultraswayed disco feel (thudding drums, Caribbean cowbells, congas, high-volume strings and horns). Against great odds, it adds up to a fresh sound, thanks to stalwart studio work by drummer Joe Vitale, percussionist Joe Lala, bassist George "Chocolate" Perry and Eric Clapton's guitarist George Terry. Their efforts are particularly noteworthy on You Can't Dance Alone, What's the Game and Can't Get No Booty. Especially reassuring is the title track, an acoustic ballad with a haunting fiddle solo by Al Gould. It harks back to Stills' finest work over the years, songs like Helplessly Hoping, 4 and 20 and As I Come of Age." Trouser Press, in a largely negative review, called the songwriting "monotonous" and said he was enthusiastically "trying to renovate his sound for today's scene". They did have praise for "Thoroughfare Gap", but still noted that it was six years old, saying it was the only song that had "the folksy funk style that once made him worthwhile". Record World said Stills was experimenting, and "You Can't Dance Alone" was geared for the Top 40.

In support of this album Stills formed the California Blues Band and toured throughout most of 1979.

== Track listing ==
All tracks are written by Stephen Stills except where indicated.

Side one
No.	Title	Writer(s)	Length
1.	"You Can't Dance Alone"		4:14
2.	"Thoroughfare Gap"		3:31
3.	"We Will Go On"		2:41
4.	"Beaucoup Yumbo"	Stills, Joe Vitale	3:33
5.	"What's the Game"		3:32

Side two
No.	Title	Writer(s)	Length
6.	"Midnight Rider"	Gregg Allman	3:39
7.	"Woman Lleva"		3:13
8.	"Lowdown"		3:46
9.	"Not Fade Away"	Buddy Holly, Norman Petty	3:26
10.	"Can't Get No Booty"	Danny Kortchmar, Stills	3:44
Total length:			35:32

== Personnel ==
- Stephen Stills – vocals, guitars (1, 3–10), percussion (1), horn and string arrangements (1, 4–8), acoustic guitar (2), bass (2, 10), synthesizers (3), Moog synthesizer (7), organ (9), acoustic piano (10)
- Mike Finnigan – acoustic piano (1, 3, 6, 8), organ (7), backing vocals (8)
- Paul Harris – acoustic piano (2)
- Kenny Kirkland – acoustic piano (5)
- Albhy Galuten – acoustic piano (7)
- Joey Murcia – guitars (1)
- George Terry – guitars (3, 5, 7)
- Gerry Tolman – guitars (6)
- Danny Kortchmar – guitars (10), percussion (10), backing vocals (10)
- George Perry – bass (1, 3–6, 8, 9), backing vocals (8, 9)
- Gerald Johnson – bass (7)
- Joe Vitale –drums (1, 3–6, 8, 9, 10), backing vocals (9)
- Paul Lee – drums (2)
- Richard O'Connell – drums (7)
- Joe Lala – percussion (1, 3, 6, 10)
- Al Gould – fiddle (2)
- Whit Sidener – flutes (3)
- Mike Lewis – horn and string arrangements (1, 4–8), flute arrangements (3)
- Andy Gibb – backing vocals (1, 5)
- Dave Mason – backing vocals (1, 5, 6)
- John Sambataro – backing vocals (1, 3, 5)
- Brooks Hunnicutt – backing vocals (8)
- Kitty Pritikin (a.k.a. Kitty Woodson Terry) – backing vocals (name misprint) (8)
- Verna Richardson – backing vocals (8)
- Lisa Roberts – backing vocals (8)

== Production ==
- Stephen Stills – producer, album design
- Howard Albert – producer, engineer
- Ron Albert – producer, engineer
- Michael Braunstein – engineer, recording (4, 6–9)
- Steve Gursky – engineer
- Mike Fuller – mastering at Criteria Studios
- John Berg – album design
- Jim McCrary – photography

Special thanks to Guillerma Giachetti, Gerry Tolman, Armando Hurley, Harper Dance, Home At Last

== Charts ==
Chart performance for Thoroughfare Gap
Chart (1978)	Peak position
US Billboard Top LPs & Tape	83
Canadian RPM 100 Albums	82
US Cash Box Top 100 Albums	135
US Record World Album Chart	140

== Tour ==
California Blues Band 1979 Tour
- Tour by Stephen Stills
- Start date: January 25, 1979
- End date: December, 1979
- Legs: 3

Stephen Stills concert chronology
- 1976 Tour; California Blues Band 1979 Tour; 1980 Tour

Stephen Stills California Blues Band Tour 1979 was a concert tour by American musician Stephen Stills. It was in support of his 1978 album Thoroughfare Gap. During the tour he also recorded another album that was rejected by his record label, many songs from this projected album were played on this tour. On this tour Stills was backed by his group the California Blues Band. The 1979 run at The Roxy, Los Angeles, was professionally recorded.

Date	City	Country	Venue	Attendance	Gross	Notes
4 September 1978	Los Angeles	United States	Greek Theatre			Bread and Roses Festival
1979 California Blues Band Tour
Date	City	Country	Venue	Attendance	Gross	Notes
25 January 1979	Los Angeles	United States	The Roxy		Sold Out	
26 January 1979	Los Angeles	United States	The Roxy		Sold Out	
27 January 1979	Los Angeles	United States	The Roxy		Sold Out	
28 January 1979	Los Angeles	United States	The Roxy		Sold Out	
Leg 1
3 March 1979	Havana	Cuba	Havana Jam			
7 March 1979	Cincinnati	United States	Cincinnati Music Hall			2 Shows
9 March 1979	Chicago	United States	Auditorium Theatre			
10 March 1979	Ohio	United States	Kent State University			
11 March 1979	Louisville	United States	Louisville Gardens			
13 March 1979	Indianapolis	United States	Indiana Convention Centre			
14 March 1979	Michigan	United States	Centre Stage	1,628	$22,228	
16 March 1979	Chicago	United States	Auditorium Theatre			
17 March 1979	Upper Darby Township, Pennsylvania	United States	Tower Theatre			
18 March 1979	New York City	United States	The Palladium	3,300	$27,000	
19 March 1979	Ohio	United States	Columbus Veterans Memorial Auditorium			
22 March 1979	Boston	United States	Boston College			
23 March 1979	Passaic	United States	Capitol Theatre	3.456	$28,172	
24 March 1979	Pittsburgh	United States	Stanley Theatre	7,442	$71,545	2 Shows
26 March 1979	Maryland	United States	DAR Constitution Center			
27 March 1979	Middletown	United States	Wesleyen University	3,010	$22,116	
29 March 1979	Reading	United States	Bollman Center			
30 March 1979	Atlanta	United States	Fox Theatre			
1 April 1979	Blacksburg	United States	Cassell Coliseum			
3 April 1979	Atlanta	United States	Fox Theatre			
4 April 1979	Nashville	United States	The Grand Ole Opry House			
7 April 1979	Kansas City	United States	Memorial Hall	2,880	$23,040	
8 April 1979	St. Louis	United States	Kiel Opera House	2,607	$21,997	
Leg 2
4 June 1979	Irvine	United States	Crawford Hall			
6 June 1979	San Diego	United States	San Diego Sports Arena			
8 June 1979	Santa Barbara	United States	Santa Barbara Bowl	4,888	$32,633	
9 June 1979	San Francisco	United States	Fox Warfield Theatre	2,248	$44,960	
10 June 1979	Los Angeles	United States	Greek Theatre			
11 June 1979	Los Angeles	United States	Greek Theatre			
12 June 1979	Los Angeles	United States	Greek Theatre			
15 June 1979	Ohio	United States	Blossom Music Center			
16 June 1979	Ohio	United States	Hara Arena			
17 June 1979	Ohio	United States	Pine Knob Music Theatre			
19 June 1979	Edwardsville	United States	Mississippi River Festival			
20 June 1979	East Troy	United States	Alpine Valley Music Theatre			
23 June 1979	Holmdel	United States	Garden State Arts Centre			
24 June 1979	New York	United States	Belmont Park	15,000		
26 June 1979	Broome	United States	Broome County Arena			
27 June 1979	Buffalo	United States	Kleinhans Music Hall			
28 June 1979	New York	United States	Saratoga Performing Arts Centre			
30 June 1979	New York	United States	Norfolk Scope			
1 July 1979	Columbia	United States	Merriweather Post Pavilion			
2 July 1979	New York	United States	Wollman Skating Ring			
7 July 1979	New Jersey	United States	Garden States Arts Centre			
Leg 3
7 September 1979	New York	United States	Woodstock '79			
8 September 1979	New York	United States	Parr Meadows Racetrack			
16 November 1979	San Diego	United States	Casino Theatre			
17 November 1979	Sacramento	United States	Freeborn Hall			
18 November 1979	Stanford Uni	United States	Memorial Hall			
9 December 1979	Northridge	United States	Cal State University			
15 December 1979	Costa Mesa	United States	LeBard Stadium			
16 December 1979	Santa Barbara	United States	Allen Hancock College Sports Pavilion			
31 December 1979	Riverside	United States	Ben H. Lewis Hall			
1980 Tour
5 April 1980	Laguna Beach	United States	Irvine Bowl			
1 June 1980	Concord	United States	Concord Pavilion			
2 June 1980	Los Angeles	United States	Greek Theatre			
3 June 1980	Los Angeles	United States	Greek Theatre			
1980 European Tour
4 July 1980						
14 July 1980	Milano	Italy	Stadio San Siro			Supported Angelo Branduardi
15 July 1980	Turin	Italy	Stadio Comunale			Supported Angelo Branduardi
17 July 1980	Nyon	Switzerland	Parc Du Lac			Nyon Folk Festival
18 July 1980	Turin	Italy	Turin Municipal Stadium			Supported Angelo Branduardi
21 July 1980	Rimini	Italy				Supported Angelo Branduardi
22 July 1980	Nyon	Switzerland	La Prairie De Colovray			Supported Angelo Branduardi
23 July 1980		Italy	Bolzano Stadium			Supported Angelo Branduardi
24 July 1980	Munich	Germany	Olympiahalle			Supported Angelo Branduardi
26 July 1980	St. Goarshausen	Germany	Freilichtbuhne Loreley			Supported Angelo Branduardi
27 July 1980		Germany	Stadium Wurzburg			Supported Angelo Branduardi
29 July 1980	Naples	Italy	Stadio San Paolo			Supported Angelo Branduardi
4 August 1980						
1980 United States
16 August 1980	Illinois	United States	Ravinia Fest De Kalb			
19 August 1980		United States	Meadow Brook Music Festival			
23 August 1980	Indianapolis	United States	Hilton U. Brown Theatre			
27 August 1980	Passaic	United States	Paramount Theatre			
29 August 1980	New York	United States	Central Park			

Stephen Stills and the California Blues Band

- Stephen Stills – guitar, percussion, vocals
- Dallas Taylor – drums (Roxy Theater 1979 only)
- Mike Finnigan – keyboards, Vocals
- Joe Lala – percussion, vocals
- Billy Meeker – drums
- Michael Sturgis – guitar
- Trey Thompson – bass
- Bonnie Bramlett – vocals
- Graham Nash – appeared during some dates of the European 1980 tour

Typical setlist

All songs written by Stephen Stills, except where noted.

1. "Precious Love"
2. "For What It's Worth"
3. "You Can't Dance Alone"
4. "Cuba Al Fin"
5. "Go Back Home"
6. "How Wrong Can You Be" (Mike Finnigan)
7. "Love The One You're With"
8. "Make Love To You"
9. "Cherokee"
10. "Rock And Roll Crazies/Cuban Bluegrass" (Stills, Dallas Taylor / Stills, Joe Lala)
11. "Jet Set (Sigh)"
12. "Thoroughfare Gap"
13. Come On In My Kitchen (Robert Johnson)
