= Chris Stills =

American musician and actor

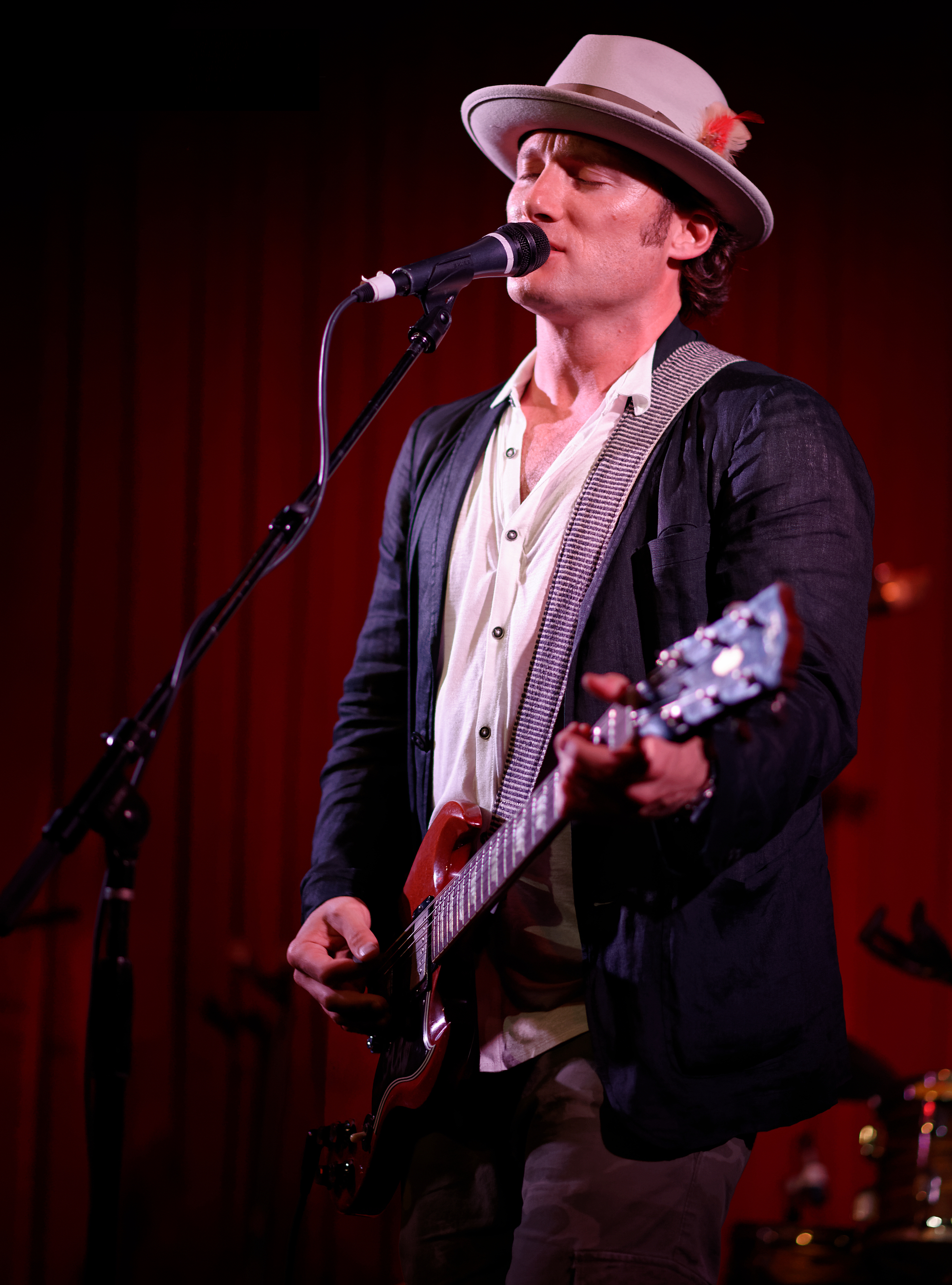
- Stills performing on April 2, 2016
- Born: April 19, 1974 (age 51); Boulder, Colorado, U.S.
- Occupations: Musician, actor
- Spouse: Heidi Lenhart (m. 2006; div. 2011)
- Children: 2
- Parents: Stephen Stills (father); Véronique Sanson (mother)

Chris Stills (born April 19, 1974) is a musician and actor. He is the son of American rock musician Stephen Stills and French singer-songwriter Véronique Sanson. He has collaborated with both of his parents.

== Early life ==
When Stills was a child, his mother taught him how to play the piano; he also played drums. When he was 12, a guitar tech for Crosby, Stills, & Nash gave him a spare guitar, which became his main instrument. His parents divorced in 1978, and at 13 he went to live with his mother in Paris. He attended the American School of Paris while there, and at 16 wrote his first song, "If I Were a Mountain".

== Career ==
After graduating from high school in 1993, Stills moved to Los Angeles, and worked as a roadie for his father. He lived in New York for a few years, forming a band at one point with Adam Cohen. Stills later signed with Atlantic Records (the same label as his father's band), and released his solo debut album, 100 Year Thing, in January 1998.

Stills' second solo album, Chris Stills, was released outside of North America in October 2005 after he was signed by V2 Records. The record was released in Canada and the United States in May 2006. Recorded at the Studio du Palais, the live EP When the Pain Dies Down: Live in Paris was released later.

He supported Richard Ashcroft on a European tour. Beginning in August 2007, Stills toured with Mandy Moore in a small venue tour, opening for her in 15+ shows across the United States and Canada.

In 2009, Stills played the role of Julius Caesar in the musical Cléopâtre, la dernière reine d'Égypte. It was the 2nd top grossing show in France in 2009. After the play wrapped, Stills got the role of Alexander Child in the French film by director Jerome LeGris called Requiem for a Killer in 2010. During the making of movie, Stills was working on a record entirely in French with producer Pierre Jaconelli for Alain Artaud. They had almost finished the making of the record when Artaud, then-president of Polydor/Universal, was fired. Stills then stopped the entire project, terminated his contract with Universal, and returned to his home in Los Angeles.

In February 2012, Stills reconnected with Ryan Adams and opened for him on a 3-week European tour.

In November 2012, Stills produced an EP with producer Dan Burns. The 6-song EP entitled Chris Stills - Let it Rain came out in 2013 digitally online and in limited 10' vinyl.

Stills had a regular guest role on two seasons of Shameless.

He released an album called Don't Be Afraid in 2018.
