= Stills Alone =

Studio album by Stephen Stills
- Released: September 11, 1991
- Recorded: Audio Vision Studios, (Miami, Florida). Except "The Right Girl" (Recorded) and "Amazonia" (Recorded & Mixed) at The Record Plant (Sausalito, California).
- Genre: Rock
- Length: 35:16
- Label: Vision Records, Gold Hill Records
- Producer: Stephen Stills, The Albert Brothers, Steve Alaimo, Gerry Tolman

Stephen Stills chronology
Right by You (1984)	Stills Alone (1991)	Turnin' Back the Pages (2003)

Professional ratings
Review scores
Source	Rating
AllMusic	3/5 stars

Stills Alone is the seventh studio album released in 1991 by American musician Stephen Stills. The album features Stills on acoustic and electric guitar, with minimal or no backing on the majority of the tracks. "Amazonia" features some percussion backing. The cover photograph was by Henry Diltz.

Singer/songwriter Ray Lamontagne has noted in interviews that track ten on this album, "Treetop Flyer", is the song that convinced him to pursue a career in music.

== Track listing ==
All tracks are written by Stephen Stills, except where noted.

Track listing
No.	Title	Writer(s)	Length
1.	"Isn't It So"		3:07
2.	"Everybody's Talkin'"	Fred Neil	3:20
3.	"Just Isn't Like You"		2:24
4.	"In My Life"	John Lennon, Paul McCartney	2:29
5.	"Ballad of Hollis Brown"	Bob Dylan	4:07
6.	"Singin' Call"		2:40
7.	"The Right Girl"		3:16
8.	"Blind Fiddler Medley"		5:32
9.	"Amazonia"		3:24
10.	"Treetop Flyer"		4:54
Total length:			35:16

== Personnel ==
- Stephen Stills – vocals, acoustic guitars, electric guitars, percussion (9)

== Production ==
- Stephen Stills – producer, recording (7, 9), mixing (9)
- Steve Alamio – producer
- Howard Albert – producer, recording (1–6, 8, 10), mixing (1–8, 10)
- Ron Albert – producer, recording (1–6, 8, 10), mixing (1–8, 10)
- Gerry Tolman – producer, recording (7, 9), mixing (9), management
- Frank Cesarano – recording (1–6, 8, 10), mixing (1–8, 10)
- Craig Brock – additional engineer
- Jim Champagne – additional engineer
- Gordon Hookailo – additional engineer
- Mike Kloster – additional engineer
- Andris Kikuts – album layout
- Henry Diltz – photography
