= List of the Hollies members =

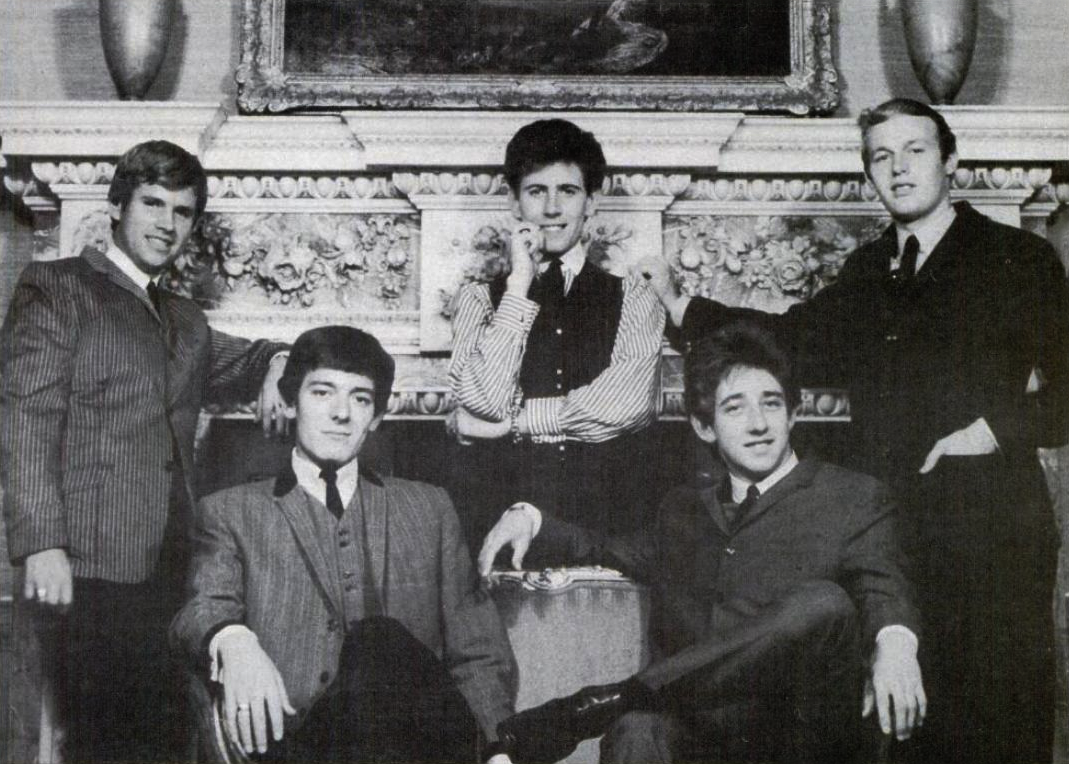
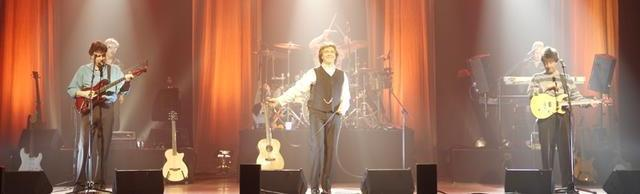
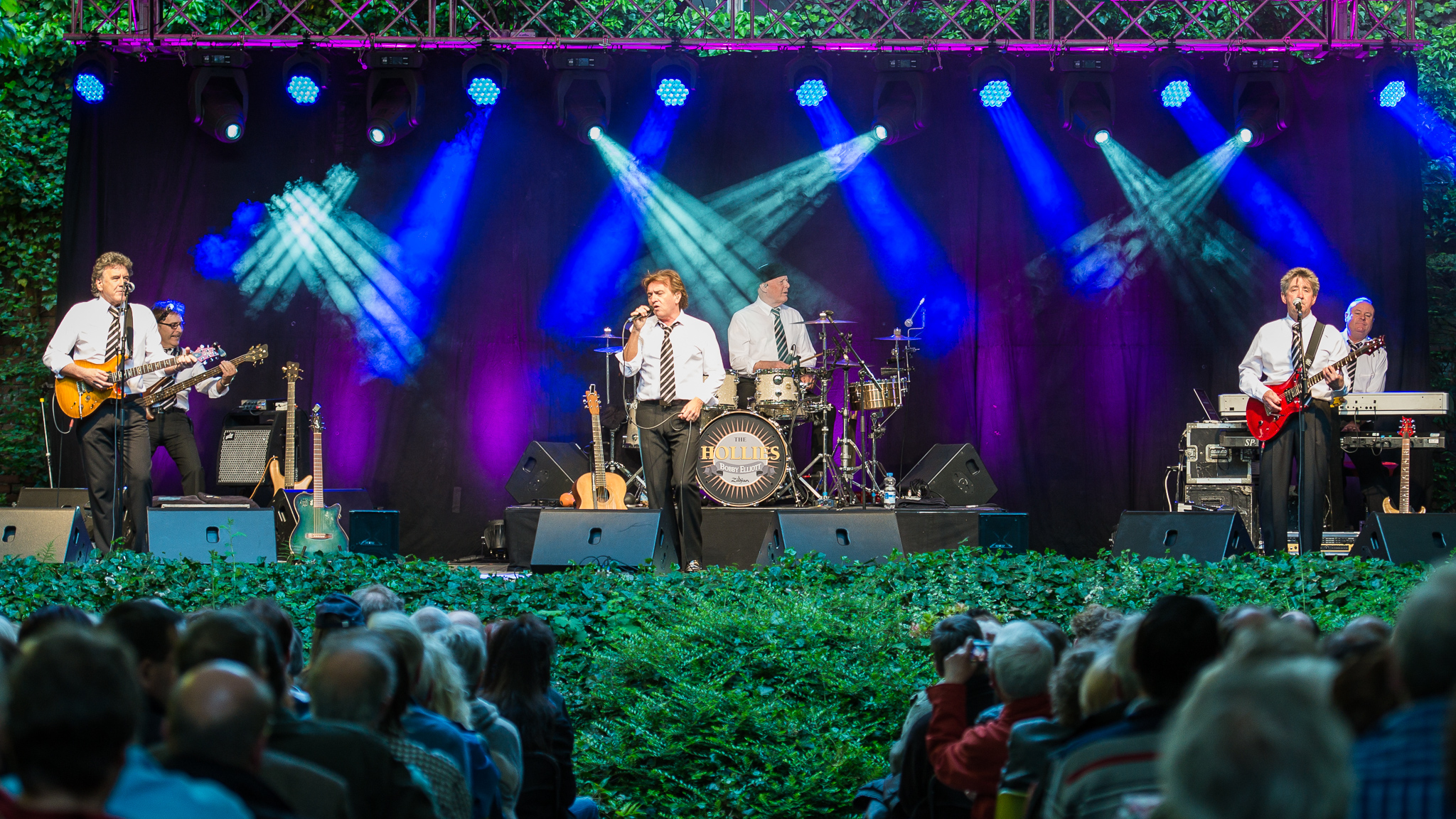
The Hollies in 1964 (top), 2006 (middle) and 2017 (bottom).

The Hollies were an English pop/rock band from Manchester. Formed in December 1962, the group originally included vocalist Allan Clarke, lead guitarist Vic Steele, rhythm guitarist and vocalist Graham Nash, bassist Eric Haydock and drummer Don Rathbone. The band went through numerous lineup changes, and at the time of their disbandment in 2026, included lead guitarist and vocalist Tony Hicks, drummer Bobby Elliott (both since 1963), bassist and vocalist Ray Stiles (from 1986 to 1990, and since 1991), keyboardist Ian Parker (since 1991), lead vocalist and guitarist Peter Howarth, and guitarist and vocalist Steve Lauri (both since 2004).

== History ==
=== 1962–1981 ===
The Hollies were formed in autumn 1962 by childhood friends Allan Clarke (lead vocals, harmonica) and Graham Nash (rhythm guitar, vocals), who enlisted lead guitarist Vic Steele, bassist Eric Haydock and drummer Don Rathbone for the original lineup. In February 1963, Steele decided he did not want to be a professional musician and left the band, who replaced him with Tony Hicks from Ricky Shaw and the Dolphins. After the group released their first two singles – "(Ain't That) Just Like Me" and "Searchin'" – Rathbone was replaced in August by another Dolphins member, Bobby Elliott. The lineup of Clarke, Nash, Hicks, Haydock and Elliott remained stable for almost three years, releasing Stay with The Hollies and In The Hollies Style in 1964, Hollies in 1965 and Would You Believe? in 1966.

In early 1966, Haydock refused to attend recording sessions due to a dispute with the band's management over earnings. He was replaced in July by Bernie Calvert, another former bandmate of Hicks and Elliott, who had earlier filled in for Haydock on a European tour and the recording of "Bus Stop". After a string of successful releases, Nash left The Hollies on 7 December 1968 to relocate to Los Angeles, California, and form Crosby, Stills & Nash with former Byrds member David Crosby and former Buffalo Springfield member Stephen Stills. Terry Sylvester left the Swinging Blue Jeans to take Nash's place the following month. Clarke remained until November 1971, when he was replaced by Swedish singer Mikael Rickfors after leaving to pursue a solo career. Clarke returned in June 1973 as lead vocalist.

Beginning in 1974, The Hollies toured with a sixth member on keyboards. First in the role was prolific session contributor Pete Wingfield, who remained a member of the touring lineup for three years. He also contributed to the albums Hollies, Write On, A Crazy Steal and Five Three One - Double Seven O Four. Later touring keyboardists included Paul Bliss, and Hans-Peter Arnesen, who recorded parts for A Crazy Steal and more.

=== 1981–2000 ===
In May 1981, both Calvert and Sylvester left the Hollies after the group began working with new producer Bruce Welch, rhythm guitarist of the Shadows. Speaking about the event, Calvert noted he was omitted from a recording session by Welch, after which he decided to leave following a phone call from Sylvester, who informed him of his intention to quit. Sylvester has recalled that he made his decision after an argument within the band, caused by a vote to stop working with long-time manager Robin Britten, with which he disagreed. Sylvester left first, with Calvert following a few days later. Clarke, Hicks and Elliott continued recording with a number of session musicians, including keyboardist Brian Chatton on their next single "Take My Love and Run", and bassist Alan Jones on its B-side "Driver".

The remaining Hollies reunited with original members Graham Nash and Eric Haydock in September 1981 for an appearance on Top of the Pops promoting "Holliedaze". The following month, it was confirmed that Nash would remain with the group for a new studio album. Recording for What Goes Around... began in March the next year, wrapping up by February 1983. The four-piece lineup toured in promotion of the album, with guitarist Alan Coates, bassist Steve Stroud, and keyboardists Bliss and Arnesen joining them for the performances. After the conclusion of the tour, Nash left, Coates and Stroud were made permanent members, and Denis Haines joined on keyboards. The new lineup released their first single, "Too Many Hearts Get Broken", on Columbia Records in May 1985.

Ray Stiles replaced Stroud in the spring of 1986, debuting with the band in June. The following year saw the release of "This Is It" and "Reunion of the Hearts", and in 1988 the band registered on the German charts with "Stand by Me" and "Shine Silently". Stroud returned alongside new keyboardist Dave Carey in 1990 for a cover of Prince's "Purple Rain", although by the next year the pair had been replaced by Stiles and Ian Parker, respectively. The lineup remained constant throughout the 1990s, releasing "The Woman I Love" and "Nothing Else But Love" in 1993, recording a new version of "He Ain't Heavy, He's My Brother" with the cast of Coronation Street in 1995, and contributing a recording of "Peggy Sue Got Married" to Not Fade Away (Remembering Buddy Holly) in 1996.

=== 2000–2026 ===
Allan Clarke left The Hollies in March 2000, after retiring from touring at the end of the previous year, leaving Hicks and Elliott the only 'classic lineup' members remaining. He was replaced by Carl Wayne, former frontman of the Move. Wayne's only recording with the band was "How Do I Survive", which was released on the 2003 compilation album Greatest Hits, before he died on 31 August 2004 of oesophageal cancer. According to the band's official website, "It was Carl's wish for The Hollies Autumn Tour to go ahead"; accordingly, Peter Howarth took his place. Coates chose to leave The Hollies shortly after Wayne's death, with Steve Lauri brought in as his replacement. This lineup of the band released two new studio albums: Staying Power in 2006 and Then, Now, Always in 2009. This was also the final lineup of the Hollies before Hicks and Elliott announced their retirement from touring in 2026.

== Members ==
| Image | Name | Years active | Instruments | Release contributions |
|---|---|---|---|---|
| | Allan Clarke | 1962–1971; 1973–2000 | lead and backing vocals; harmonica; guitar | all releases up to Distant Light (1971); all releases from Hollies (1974) to The Air That I Breath: The Very Best of the Hollies (1993) |
| | Graham Nash | 1962–1968; 1981–1983 | rhythm guitar; backing and lead vocals | all releases up to "Listen to Me" (1968); What Goes Around... (1983) |
| | Eric Haydock | 1962–1966 (died 2019) | bass | all releases up to "I Can't Let Go" (1966); Would You Believe? (1966) |
| | Don Rathbone | 1962–1963 (died 2024) | drums | all releases up to "Searchin'" (1963) |
| | Vic Steele | 1962–1963 | lead guitar | none |
| | Tony Hicks | 1963–2026 | lead guitar; banjo; mandolin; sitar; backing and occasional lead vocals | all Hollies releases |
| | Bobby Elliott | 1963–2026 | drums; percussion | all releases from Stay with the Hollies (1964) onwards |
| | Bernie Calvert | 1966–1981 | bass; keyboards | "Bus Stop" (1966); all releases from For Certain Because... (1966) to Buddy Holly (1980) |
| | Terry Sylvester | 1969–1981 | rhythm guitar; backing and lead vocals | all releases from "Sorry Suzanne" (1969) to Buddy Holly (1980) |
| | Mikael Rickfors | 1971–1973 | lead and backing vocals; guitar; harmonica | all releases from "The Baby" (1972) to Out on the Road (1973) |
| | Alan Coates | 1983–2004 (touring 1981–83) | rhythm guitar; backing vocals | all releases from "Too Many Hearts Get Broken" (1985) to Greatest Hits (2003) |
| | Steve Stroud | 1983–1986; 1990–1991 (touring 1981–83) | bass | all releases from What Goes Around... (1983) to "Too Many Hearts Get Broken" (1985); "Purple Rain" (1990) |
| | Denis Haines | 1983–1990 | keyboards | all releases from "Too Many Hearts Get Broken" (1985) to "Baby Come Back" (1989) |
| | Ray Stiles | 1986–1990; 1991–2026 | bass; backing vocals | all releases from "This Is It" (1987) to "Baby Come Back" (1989); all releases from The Air That I Breath: The Very Best of the Hollies (1993) onwards |
| | Dave Carey | 1990–1991 | keyboards | "Purple Rain" (1990) |
| | Ian Parker | 1991–2026 | keyboards; backing vocals | all releases from The Air That I Breath: The Very Best of the Hollies (1993) onwards |
| | Carl Wayne | 2000–2004 (until his death) | lead and backing vocals | Greatest Hits (2003) |
| | Peter Howarth | 2004–2026 | lead and backing vocals; acoustic guitar | all releases from Staying Power (2006) onwards |
| | Steve Lauri | 2004–2026 | rhythm guitar; backing and occasional lead vocals | all releases from Staying Power (2006) onwards |

=== Touring ===
| Image | Name | Years active | Instruments | Notes |
|---|---|---|---|---|
| | Klaus Voormann | 1966 | bass | Voormann filled in for Haydock for a few shows during early 1966. |
| | Tony Mansfield | 1967 | drums | Mansfield, Newman, and Wright each filled in for Elliott while he was hospitalized during early-to-mid 1967. |
| | Tony Newman | 1967 | drums | Mansfield, Newman, and Wright each filled in for Elliott while he was hospitalized during early-to-mid 1967. |
| | Dougie Wright | 1967 | drums | Mansfield, Newman, and Wright each filled in for Elliott while he was hospitalized during early-to-mid 1967. |
| | Pete Wingfield | 1974–1977 | keyboards; synthesizers | Wingfield began touring with The Hollies after the release of their 1974 self-titled album, remaining until 1977. |
| | Paul Bliss | 1979; 1982–1983 | keyboards; synthesizers | Bliss performed keyboards on a number of Hollies tours, as well as contributing to several studio albums. |
| | Hans-Peter Arnesen | 1979; 1982–1983 | keyboards; synthesizers | Arnesen recorded for several albums and performed on multiple tours alongside Wingfield and Bliss. |
| | Jamie Moses | 1983; 1986 | rhythm guitar; backing vocals | Moses temporarily replaced Coates during shows in New Zealand in 1983, and later in Europe in 1986. |
| | John Miles | 1999 (died 2021) | lead and backing vocals | Miles replaced Clarke, who was unavailable due to a family illness, for a run of three shows in March 1999. |
| | Ian Harrison | 2003; 2004 | lead and backing vocals | Harrison replaced Wayne for one show on 24 January 2003, and again for another on 21 August 2004. |

== Lineups ==
| Period | Members | Releases |
|---|---|---|
| December 1962 – February 1963 | Allan Clarke – vocals, harmonica, guitar; Vic Steele – lead guitar; Graham Nash – rhythm guitar, vocals; Eric Haydock – bass; Don Rathbone – drums | none |
| February – August 1963 | Allan Clarke – vocals, harmonica, guitar; Tony Hicks – lead guitar, vocals; Graham Nash – rhythm guitar, vocals; Eric Haydock – bass; Don Rathbone – drums | "(Ain't That) Just Like Me" (1963); "Searchin'" (1963) |
| August 1963 – May 1966 | Allan Clarke – vocals, harmonica, guitar; Tony Hicks – lead guitar, vocals; Graham Nash – rhythm guitar, vocals; Eric Haydock – bass; Bobby Elliott – drums, percussion | Stay with The Hollies (1964); "Just One Look" (1964); "Here I Go Again" (1964); The Hollies (1964); "We're Through" (1964); In The Hollies Style (1964); "Yes I Will" (1965); "I'm Alive" (1965); "Look Through Any Window" (1965); Hollies (1965); I'm Alive (1965); "If I Needed Someone" (1965); "I Can't Let Go" (1966); Would You Believe? (1966) |
| May 1966 – December 1968 | Allan Clarke – vocals, harmonica, guitar; Tony Hicks – lead guitar, vocals; Graham Nash – rhythm guitar, vocals; Bernie Calvert – bass, keyboards; Bobby Elliott – drums, percussion | "Bus Stop" (1966); For Certain Because... (1966); "On a Carousel" (1967); "Carrie Anne" (1967); Evolution (1967); "King Midas in Reverse" (1967); Butterfly (1967); Hollies' Greatest (1968) - one new track: "Jennifer Eccles"; "Listen to Me" (1968) |
| December 1968 – November 1971 | Allan Clarke – vocals, harmonica, guitar; Tony Hicks – lead guitar, vocals; Terry Sylvester – rhythm guitar, vocals; Bernie Calvert – bass, keyboards; Bobby Elliott – drums, percussion | "Sorry Suzanne" (1969); Hollies Sing Dylan (1969); "He Ain't Heavy, He's My Brother" (1969); Hollies Sing Hollies (1969); "I Can't Tell the Bottom from the Top" (1970); "Gasoline Alley Bred" (1970); Confessions of the Mind (1970); "Hey Willy" (1971); Distant Light (1971) |
| November 1971 – June 1973 | Mikael Rickfors – vocals, harmonica, guitar; Tony Hicks – lead guitar, vocals; Terry Sylvester – rhythm guitar, vocals; Bernie Calvert – bass, keyboards; Bobby Elliott – drums, percussion | "The Baby" (1972); Romany (1972); Out on the Road (1973) |
| June 1973 – May 1981 | Allan Clarke – vocals, harmonica, guitar; Tony Hicks – lead guitar, vocals; Terry Sylvester – rhythm guitar, vocals; Bernie Calvert – bass, keyboards; Bobby Elliott – drums, percussion | Hollies (1974); "Son of a Rotten Gambler" (1974); Another Night (1975); Write On (1976); "Boulder to Birmingham" (1976); Hollies Live Hits (1976); Russian Roulette (1976); "Hello to Romance" (1977); A Crazy Steal (1978); 5317704 (1979); "Soldier's Song" (1980); Buddy Holly (1980) |
| May 1981 – October 1983 | Allan Clarke – vocals, harmonica, guitar; Tony Hicks – lead guitar, vocals; Graham Nash – rhythm guitar, vocals; Bobby Elliott – drums, percussion; with several session musicians | What Goes Around... (1983) |
| October 1983 – May 1986 | Allan Clarke – vocals, harmonica, guitar; Tony Hicks – lead guitar, vocals; Alan Coates – rhythm guitar, vocals; Steve Stroud – bass; Bobby Elliott – drums, percussion; Denis Haines – keyboards | "Too Many Hearts Get Broken" (1985) |
| May 1986 – February 1990 | Allan Clarke – vocals, harmonica, guitar; Tony Hicks – lead guitar, vocals; Alan Coates – rhythm guitar, vocals; Ray Stiles – bass, vocals; Bobby Elliott – drums, percussion; Denis Haines – keyboards | "This Is It" (1987); "Reunion of the Heart" (1987); "Stand by Me" (1988); "Shine Silently" (1988); "Find Me a Family" (1989); "Baby Come Back" (1989) |
| February 1990 – September 1991 | Allan Clarke – vocals, harmonica, guitar; Tony Hicks – lead guitar, vocals; Alan Coates – rhythm guitar, vocals; Steve Stroud – bass; Bobby Elliott – drums, percussion; Dave Carey – keyboards | "Purple Rain" (1990) |
| September 1991 – March 2000 | Allan Clarke – vocals, harmonica, guitar; Tony Hicks – lead guitar, vocals; Alan Coates – rhythm guitar, vocals; Ray Stiles – bass, vocals; Bobby Elliott – drums, percussion; Ian Parker – keyboards | The Air That I Breath: The Very Best of the Hollies (1993) - one new track: "The Woman I Love" |
| March 2000 – August 2004 | Carl Wayne – vocals; Tony Hicks – lead guitar, vocals; Alan Coates – rhythm guitar, vocals; Ray Stiles – bass, vocals; Bobby Elliott – drums, percussion; Ian Parker – keyboards | Greatest Hits (2003) - one new track: "How Do I Survive" |
| September 2004 – August 2026 | Peter Howarth – vocals, acoustic guitar; Tony Hicks – lead guitar, vocals; Steve Lauri – rhythm guitar, vocals; Ray Stiles – bass, vocals; Bobby Elliott – drums, percussion; Ian Parker – keyboards | Staying Power (2006); Then, Now, Always (2009); Hollies Live Hits! We Got the Tunes! (2013); 50 at Fifty (2014) - one new track: "Skylarks" |
