= The Hollies discography =

Cataloguing of published recordings by The Hollies

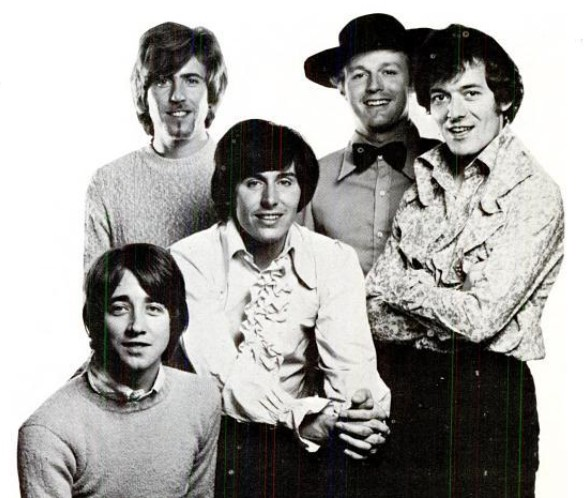
- The Hollies in 1968
- Studio albums: 23
- Extended plays: 7
- Live albums: 3
- Compilation albums: 16
- Singles: 94

The discography of English rock and pop band the Hollies consists of 23 studio albums, three live albums, 16 compilation albums, seven extended plays, and 67 singles.

Since the Hollies released their debut single on 17 May 1963, the group has had 30 charting singles on the UK Singles Chart, 21 on the Billboard Hot 100, 21 on RPM magazine's singles chart, 25 on Germany's singles chart, and 11 on the VG-lista singles chart. Many of the Hollies' singles contain three-part vocal harmony, although a few—such as "Long Cool Woman in a Black Dress"—do not contain any vocal harmonies.

A total of 15 albums by the Hollies have charted on the UK Albums Chart, 13 have charted on the Billboard 200, five have charted on the VG-lista albums chart, four have charted in the Netherlands, and six have charted on RPM magazine's Top Albums chart.

== Studio albums ==
Title	Album details	Peak chart positions					
Title	Album details	UK	AUS	CAN	NZ	NOR	US
Stay with The Hollies (UK)	Released: January 1964; Label: Parlophone (PMC 1220 / PCS 3054); Format: LP	2	—	—	—	—	—
Here I Go Again (US)	Released: June 1964; Label: Imperial (LP-9265 / LP-12265); Format: LP	—	—	—	—	—	—
In The Hollies Style (UK)	Released: November 1964; Label: Parlophone (PMC 1235); Format: LP	—	—	—	—	—	—
Hollies (UK)	Released: September 1965; Label: Parlophone (PMC 1261); Format: LP	8	—	—	—	—	—
Hear! Here! (US)	Released: November 1965; Label: Imperial (LP-9299 / LP-12269); Format: LP	—	—	—	—	—	145
Beat Group! (US)	Released: May 1966; Label: Imperial (LP-9312 / LP-12312); Format: LP	—	—	—	—	—	—
Would You Believe? (UK)	Released: June 1966; Label: Parlophone (PMC/PCS 7008); Format: LP	16	—	—	—	—	—
Bus Stop (US)	Released: October 1966; Label: Imperial (LP-9330 / LP-123300); Format: LP	—	—	—	—	—	75
For Certain Because... (UK)	Released: December 1966; Label: Parlophone (PMC/PCS 7011); Format: LP	23	—	—	—	4	—
Stop! Stop! Stop! (US)	Released: January 1967; Label: Imperial (LP-9339 / LP-12339); Format: LP	—	—	—	—	—	91
Evolution (UK)	Released: June 1967; Label: Parlophone (PMC/PCS 7022); Format: LP	13	—	—	—	3	—
Evolution (US)	Released: July 1967; Label: Epic (LN 24315 / BN 26315); Format: LP	—	—	—	—	—	43
Butterfly (UK)	Released: November 1967; Label: Parlophone (PMC/PCS 7039); Format: LP	—	—	—	—	—	—
Dear Eloise / King Midas in Reverse (US)	Released: December 1967; Label: Epic (LN 24344 / BN 26344); Format: LP	—	—	—	—	—	—
Hollies Sing Dylan (UK)	Released: May 1969; Label: Parlophone (PMC/PCS 7078); Format: LP	3	—	—	—	—	—
Words and Music by Bob Dylan (US)	Released: July 1969; Label: Epic (BN 26447); Format: LP	—	—	—	—	—	—
Hollies Sing Hollies (UK)	Released: November 1969; Label: Parlophone (PCS 7092); Format: LP	—	20	—	—	—	—
He Ain't Heavy, He's My Brother (US)	Released: December 1969; Label: Epic (BN 26538); Format: LP	—	—	38	—	—	32
Confessions of the Mind (UK)	Released: November 1970; Label: Parlophone (PCS 7116); Format: LP	30	8	—	—	—	—
Moving Finger (US)	Released: January 1971; Label: Epic (E 30255); Format: LP	—	—	—	—	—	183
Distant Light	Released: October 1971 (UK) / April 1972 (US); Label (UK): Parlophone (PAS 10005); Label (US): Epic (KE 30958); Format: LP	—	28	17	—	28	21
Romany	Released: November 1972 (UK) / January 1973 (US); Label (UK): Polydor (2383 144); Label (US): Epic (E 31992); Format: LP	—	57	29	—	—	84
Out on the Road	Released: June 1973; Label: Hansa (87119IT); Format: LP	—	—	—	—	—	—
Hollies	Released: March 1974 (UK) / April 1974 (US); Label (UK): Polydor (2383 262); Label (US): Epic (KE 32574); Format: LP	38	53	15	—	—	28
Another Night	Released: February 1975 (UK) / March 1975 (US); Label (UK): Polydor (2442 128); Label (US): Epic (PE 33387); Format: LP	—	71	—	21	—	123
Write On (UK)	Released: January 1976; Label: Polydor (2442 141); Format: LP	—	63	—	9	—	—
Russian Roulette (UK)	Released: December 1976; Label: Polydor (2383 421); Format: LP	—	—	—	—	—	—
Clarke, Hicks, Sylvester, Calvert, Elliott (US)	Released: May 1977; Label: Epic (PE 34714); Format: LP	—	—	—	—	—	—
A Crazy Steal	Released: March 1978 (UK) / July 1978 (US); Label (UK): Polydor (2383 474); Label (US): Epic (JE 35334); Format: LP	—	—	—	—	—	—
Five Three One - Double Seven O Four	Released: March 1979; Label: Polydor (2442 160); Format: LP	—	—	—	—	—	—
Buddy Holly	Released: October 1980; Label: Polydor (POLTV 12); Format: LP	—	—	—	—	—	—
What Goes Around...	Released: July 1983; Label (UK): WEA (25 0139 1); Label (US): Atlantic (80076-1); Format: LP	—	—	—	—	—	90
Staying Power	Released: 20 February 2006; Label: EMI (0946 355983 2 2); Format: CD	—	—	—	—	—	—
Then, Now, Always	Released: 4 March 2009; Label: EMI (50999 9 17502 2 8); Format: CD	—	—	—	—	—	—
"—" denotes releases that did not chart.

== Live albums ==
Title	Album details	Peak chart positions
Title	Album details	UK
Hollies Live Hits	Released: 1976; Label: Polydor (2383 428); Format: LP	4
Radio Fun (reissued as Live at the BBC in 2018)	Released: 2012; Label: EMI (440 7702); Format: CD	—
Hollies Live Hits! We Got the Tunes!	Released: 2013; Label: Hollies Production (30563); Format: CD	—
"—" denotes releases that did not chart.

== Compilation albums ==
Title	Album details	Peak chart positions			Certification
Title	Album details	UK	AUS	US	Certification
The Hollies' Greatest Hits (US)	Released: May 1967; Label: Imperial (LP-9350 / LP-12350); Format: LP	—	—	11	
Hollies' Greatest (UK)	Released: August 1968; Label: Parlophone (PMC/PCS 7057); Format: LP	1	—	—	
Hollies' Greatest/Vol. 2 (UK)	Released: November 1972; Label: Parlophone (PCS 7148); Format: LP	—	32	—	
The Hollies' Greatest Hits (US)	Released: April 1973; Label: Epic (KE 32061); Format: LP	—	—	157	US: Gold
20 Golden Greats	Released: July 1978; Label: EMI (EMTV 11); Format: LP	2	—	—	
The Best of The Hollies (Australia)	Released: October 1980; Label: Polydor; Format: LP	—	42	—	
Nothing But the Very Best (Australia)	Released: October 1982; Label: Hammard; Format: LP	—	45	—	
All the Hits & More	Released: September 1988; Label: EMI (EM 1301); Format: LP/CD	51	—	—	
Rarities	Released: November 1988; Label: EMI (EMS 1311); Format: LP/CD	—	—	—	
The Air That I Breathe: The Very Best of The Hollies (UK)	Released: March 1993; Label: EMI (EMTV/CDEMTV 74); Format: LP/CD	15	—	—	
30th Anniversary Collection 1963–1993 (US)	Released: 1993; Label: EMI (E2 99917); Format: CD	—	—	—	
The Hollies at Abbey Road 1963–1966	Released: October 1997; Label: EMI (CDABBEY 103); Format: CD	—	—	—	
The Hollies at Abbey Road 1966–1970	Released: February 1998; Label: EMI (CD 493 4502); Format: CD	—	—	—	
The Hollies at Abbey Road 1973–1989	Released: August 1998; Label: EMI (CD 496 4342); Format: CD	—	—	—	
Greatest Hits	Released: 24 March 2003; Label: EMI (7243 582012 2 2); Format: CD	21	—	—	
The Long Road Home 1963–2003	Released: 20 October 2003; Label: EMI (02743 584856); Format: CD box set	—	—	—	
Midas Touch: The Very Best of The Hollies	Released: 22 February 2010; Label: EMI (6082272); Format: CD	23	—	—	UK: Silver
Clarke, Hicks & Nash Years: The Complete Hollies April 1963 – October 1968	Released: 9 May 2011; Label: EMI (5099909624221); Format: CD box set	—	—	—	
50 at Fifty	Released: 19 September 2014; Label (UK): Parlophone (825646223541); Label (US): Parlophone (RP2-223541); Format: CD	—	—	—	
Changin' Times: The Complete Hollies January 1969 – March 1973	Released: 10 July 2015; Label: EMI (5099909624221); Format: CD box set	—	—	—	
Head Out of Dreams: The Complete Hollies August 1973 – May 1988	Released: 17 March 2017; Label: EMI (5099909624221); Format: CD box set	—	—	—	
"—" denotes releases that did not chart.

== EPs ==
Title	Album details	UK
The Hollies	Released: June 1964; Label: Parlophone (GEP 8909); Format: EP	8
Just One Look	Released: July 1964; Label: Parlophone (GEP 8911); Format: EP	8
Here I Go Again	Released: October 1964; Label: Parlophone (GEP 8915); Format: EP	—
We're Through	Released: December 1964; Label: Parlophone (GEP 8927); Format: EP	—
In The Hollies Style	Released: April 1965; Label: Parlophone (GEP 8934); Format: EP	—
I'm Alive	Released: September 1965; Label: Parlophone (GEP 8942); Format: EP	5
I Can't Let Go	Released: June 1966; Label: Parlophone (GEP 8951); Format: EP	9
"—" denotes releases that did not chart.

== Singles ==
Title	Year	Peak chart positions										Album
Title	Year	UK	AUS	CAN	GER	IRE	NL	NZ	SA	SWE	US	Album
"(Ain't That) Just Like Me" B side: "Hey What's Wrong With Me"	1963	25	—	—	—	—	—	—	—	—	—	non-album single
"Searchin'" B side: "Whole World Over"	1963	12	—	—	—	—	—	—	—	—	—	non-album single
"Stay" B side: "Now's The Time"	1963	8	—	—	—	—	—	—	—	20	—	Stay with the Hollies
"Just One Look" B side: "Keep Off That Friend Of Mine"	1964	2	29	—	—	6	—	4	—	8	98	Here I Go Again
"Here I Go Again" B side: "Baby That's All"	1964	4	24	—	—	—	—	5	—	17	107	Here I Go Again
"Lucille" (Note: "Lucille" was only released as a single in Australia and South Africa.) B side: "Little Lover"	1964	—	67	—	—	—	—	—	—	—	—	Stay with the Hollies
"We're Through" B side: "Come On Back"	1964	7	88	—	—	—	—	—	—	—	—	non-album single
"Yes I Will" B side: "Nobody"	1965	9	—	—	—	—	—	—	—	11	—	non-album single
"I'm Alive" B side: "You Know He Did"	1965	1	16	11	16	1	10	3	3	4	103	Hear! Here!
"Look Through Any Window" B side: "So Lonely"	1965	4	14	3	—	3	15	—	3	—	32	Hear! Here!
"If I Needed Someone" B side: "I've Got A Way Of My Own"	1965	20	—	—	—	—	—	—	—	—	—	non-album single
"I Can't Let Go" B side: "Running Through The Night"	1966	2	63	44	30	3	20	9	14	10	42	Would You Believe?
"Very Last Day" (Note: "Very Last Day" was only released as a single in Continental Europe and Scandinavia.) B side: "Too Many People"	1966	—	—	—	—	—	—	—	—	3	—	Hollies
"Bus Stop" B side: "Don't Run And Hide"	1966	5	2	1	9	4	4	3	11	1	5	Bus Stop
"After the Fox" (with Peter Sellers) B side: "The Fox Trot" (Burt Bacharach & His Orchestra)	1966	—	—	—	—	—	—	—	—	—	—	non-album singles
"Stop Stop Stop" B side: "It's You"	1966	2	11	1	4	5	5	1	—	4	7	For Certain Because
"What's Wrong with the Way I Live" (Note: "What's Wrong with the Way I Live" was only released as a single in Scandinavia and Germany.) B side: "Don't Even Think About Changing" (Scandinavia) or "High Classed" (Germany)	1966	—	—	—	—	—	—	—	—	14	—	For Certain Because
"On a Carousel" B side: "All The World Is Love"	1967	4	10	7	8	5	16	3	12	2	11	non-album single
"Pay You Back with Interest" (Note: "Pay You Back with Interest" was only released as a single in North America and New Zealand.) B side: "Whatcha Gonna Do 'Bout It"	1967	—	—	18	—	—	—	18	—	—	28	For Certain Because
"Carrie Anne" B side: "Signs That Will Never Change"	1967	3	7	9	8	4	4	3	2	2	9	Evolution (US)
"Peculiar Situation" (Note: "Peculiar Situation" was only released as a single in Germany.) B side: "Pay You Back With Interest"	1967	—	—	—	—	—	—	—	—	—	—	For Certain Because
"Kill Me Quick" (Note: "Kill Me Quick" was only released as a single in Italy.) B side: "We're Alive"	1967	—	—	—	—	—	—	—	—	—	—	non-album single
"Non Prego Per Me" (Note: "Non Prego Per Me" was only released as a single in Italy.) B side: "Devi Avere Fiducia In Me"	1967	—	—	—	—	—	—	—	—	—	—	non-album single
"That's My Desire" (Note: "That's My Desire" was only released as a single in South Africa.) B side: "Mickey's Monkey"	1967	—	—	—	—	—	—	—	1	—	—	Hollies
"King Midas in Reverse" B side: "Everything Is Sunshine"	1967	18	15	31	31	—	16	14	—	17	51	Dear Eloise / King Midas in Reverse
"Just One Look" (re-release) (Note: "Just One Look" was only re-released in North America.) B side: "Running Through The Night"	1967	—	—	30	—	—	—	—	—	—	44	Here I Go Again
"Dear Eloise" (Note: "Dear Eloise" was only released as a single in North America, Australasia, Continental Europe, Scandinavia, Japan and South Africa.) B side: "When Your Lights Turned On"	1967	—	35	36	8	—	6	4	—	7	50	Butterfly
"Jennifer Eccles" B side: "Open Up Your Eyes"	1968	7	18	19	8	7	17	8	7	6	40	non-album single
"Step Inside" (Note: "Step Inside" was only released as a single in New Zealand.) B side: "Postcard"	1968	—	—	—	—	—	—	—	—	—	—	Butterfly
"Do the Best You Can" (Note: "Do the Best You Can" was only released as a single in North America, Australasia, Germany and Sweden.) B side: "Elevated Observations" (America, Australia) or "Like Everytime Before" (Europe)	1968	—	51	—	—	—	—	—	—	—	93	non-album single
"Listen to Me" B side: "Do The Best You Can"	1968	11	33	—	13	5	5	7	11	—	129	non-album single
"Sorry Suzanne" B side: "Not That Way At All"	1969	3	8	41	7	4	4	4	1	15	56	non-album single
"Blowin' in the Wind" (Note: "Blowin' in the Wind" was only released as a single in the Netherlands and New Zealand.) B side: "Wheels On Fire"	1969	—	—	—	—	—	8	—	—	—	—	Hollies Sing Dylan
"I'll Be Your Baby Tonight" (Note: "I'll Be Your Baby Tonight" was only released as a single in Germany.) B side: "I Shall Be Released"	1969	—	—	—	—	—	—	—	—	—	—	Hollies Sing Dylan
"He Ain't Heavy, He's My Brother" B side: "'Cos You Like To Love Me"	1969	3	8	11	9	3	15	7	1	—	7	He Ain't Heavy, He's My Brother
"Goodbye Tomorrow" (Note: "Goodbye Tomorrow" was only released as a single in the Netherlands.) B side: "I'll Be Your Baby Tonight"	1970	—	—	—	—	—	—	—	—	—	—	Hollies Sing Hollies
"Why Didn't You Believe?" (Note: "Why Didn't You Believe?" was only released as a single in New Zealand.) B side: "Don't Give Up Easily"	1970	—	—	—	—	—	—	—	—	—	—	Hollies Sing Hollies
"I Can't Tell the Bottom from the Top" B side: "Mad Professor Blyth"	1970	7	—	48	25	8	9	12	11	—	82	non-album single
"Gasoline Alley Bred" B side: "Dandelion Wine"	1970	14	17	—	—	12	—	—	—	—	—	Moving Finger
"Frightened Lady" (Note: "Frightened Lady" was only released as a single in Germany.) B side: "Too Young To Be Married"	1971	—	—	—	—	—	—	—	—	—	—	Confessions of the Mind
"Survival of the Fittest" (Note: "Survival of the Fittest" was only released as a single in North America.) B side: "Man Without A Heart"	1971	—	—	—	—	—	—	—	—	—	—	Confessions of the Mind
"Too Young to Be Married" (Note: "Too Young to Be Married" was only released as a single in Australasia and the Netherlands.) B side: "Man Without A Heart" (Australia) or "I Wanna Shout" (the Netherlands)	1971	—	1	—	—	—	—	1	—	—	—	Confessions of the Mind
"Hey Willy" B side: "Row The Boat Together"	1971	22	—	—	19	16	16	16	—	—	110	non-album single
"The Baby" B side: "Oh Granny"	1972	26	73	—	23	—	8	—	—	—	—	non-album single
"Long Cool Woman in a Black Dress" B side: "Cable Car"	1972	32	2	1	15	—	21	2	1	—	2	Distant Light
"Man Without a Heart" (Note: "Man Without a Heart" was only released as a single in the Netherlands.) B side: "Survival Of The Fittest"	1972	—	—	—	32	—	29	—	—	—	—	Confessions of the Mind
"Long Dark Road" (Note: "Long Dark Road" was only released as a single in North America, Continental Europe and South Africa.) B side: "Indian Girl" (America) or "Promised Land" (Europe) or "Hold On" (South Africa)	1972	—	—	24	—	—	—	—	—	—	26	Distant Light
"Magic Woman Touch" B side: "Indian Girl"	1972	—	33	55	—	—	9	5	—	—	60	Romany
"Don't Leave the Child Alone" (Note: "Don't Leave the Child Alone" was only released as a single in Germany and Spain.) B side: "Blue In The Morning"	1973	—	—	—	—	—	—	—	—	—	—	Out on the Road
"Jesus Was a Cross Maker" B side: "I Had A Dream"	1973	—	—	—	—	—	—	—	—	—	—	Romany
"Slow Down Go Down" (Note: "Slow Down Go Down" was only released as a single in Australasia.) B side: "The Last Wind"	1973	—	73	—	—	—	—	—	—	—	—	Out on the Road
"Slow Down" (Note: "Slow Down" was only released as a single in North America. It is a different song to "Slow Down Go Down".) B side: "Won't We Feel Good"	1973	—	—	—	—	—	—	—	—	—	—	Romany
"The Day that Curly Billy Shot Down Crazy Sam McGee" B side: "Born A Man"	1973	24	40	—	45	—	2	—	—	—	—	Hollies
"The Air That I Breathe" B side: "No More Riders"	1974	2	2	5	4	6	1	1	1	—	6	Hollies
"Son of a Rotten Gambler" B side: "Layin' To The Music"	1974	—	69	—	30	—	16	10	—	—	—	non-album single
"Don't Let Me Down" (Note: "Don't Let Me Down" was only released as a single in North America.) B side: "Lay Into The Music"	1974	—	—	—	—	—	—	—	—	—	—	Hollies
"I'm Down" B side: "Hello Lady Goodbye"	1974	—	26	—	23	—	18	26	—	—	104	Another Night
"Out on the Road" (Note: "Out on the Road" was only released as a single in Germany.) B side: "A Better Place"	1974	—	—	—	—	—	—	—	—	—	—	Hollies
"4th of July, Asbury Park (Sandy)" B side: "Second Hand Hang-Ups"	1975	—	—	93	22	—	9	12	—	—	85	Another Night
"Falling Calling" (Note: "Falling Calling" was only released as a single in the Netherlands and Belgium.) B side: "Time Machine Jive"	1975	—	—	—	—	—	—	—	—	—	—	Hollies
"Lonely Hobo Lullaby" (Note: "Lonely Hobo Lullaby" was only released as a single in New Zealand.) B side: "Second Hand Hang-Ups"	1975	—	—	—	—	—	—	22	—	—	—	Another Night
"Another Night" (Note: "Another Night" was only released as a single in North America and South America.) B side: "Time Machine Jive" (North America) or "Look Out Johnny (There's A Monkey On Your Back)" (South America)	1975	—	—	—	—	—	—	—	—	—	71	Another Night
"Write On" (Note: "Write On" was only released as a single in North America, Continental Europe and South Africa.) B side: "Crocodile Woman (She Bites)" (North America) or "Stranger" (Europe and South Africa)	1975	—	—	—	31	—	—	—	20	—	—	Write On
"Boulder to Birmingham" B side: "Crocodile Woman (She Bites)"	1976	—	—	—	—	—	—	10	—	—	—	A Crazy Steal
"Star" B side: "Love Is The Thing"	1976	—	90	—	—	—	—	7	—	—	—	Write On
"Daddy Don't Mind" B side: "C'mon"	1976	—	—	—	—	—	17	—	—	—	—	Russian Roulette
"Wiggle That Wotsit" B side: "Corrine"	1976	—	—	—	—	—	20	11	—	19	—	Russian Roulette
"Russian Roulette" (Note: "Russian Roulette" was only released as a single in New Zealand.) B side: "Thanks For The Memories"	1977	—	—	—	—	—	—	—	—	—	—	Russian Roulette
"Hello to Romance" B side: "48 Hour Parole"	1977	—	—	—	—	—	—	—	—	—	—	A Crazy Steal
"Draggin' My Heels" (Note: "Draggin' My Heels" was only released as a single in North America.) B side: "I Won't Move Over"	1977	—	—	—	—	—	—	—	—	—	—	Russian Roulette
"Amnesty" B side: "Crossfire"	1977	—	—	—	—	—	—	—	—	—	—	A Crazy Steal
"Burn Out" (Note: "Burn Out" was only released as a single in Germany.) B side: "Writing On The Wall"	1977	—	—	—	—	—	—	—	—	—	—	A Crazy Steal
"Writing on the Wall" (Note: "Writing on the Wall" was only released as a single in North America and New Zealand.) B side: "Burn Out"	1978	—	—	—	—	—	—	—	—	—	—	A Crazy Steal
"Something to Live For" B side: "Song Of The Sun"	1979	—	—	—	—	—	—	—	—	—	—	Five Three One - Double Seven O Four
"Harlequin" (Note: "Harlequin" was only released as a single in Germany.) B side: "What Am I Gonna Do"	1979	—	—	—	—	—	—	—	—	—	—	Five Three One - Double Seven O Four
"Soldier's Song" B side: "Draggin' My Heels"	1980	58	—	—	—	—	—	—	—	—	—	non-album single
"Heartbeat" B side: "Take Your Time"	1980	—	—	—	—	—	—	—	—	—	—	Buddy Holly
"Holliedaze" B side: "Holliepops"	1981	28	—	—	—	—	—	37	—	—	—	non-album single
"Take My Love and Run" B side: "Driver"	1981	—	—	—	—	—	—	—	—	—	—	What Goes Around...
"Stop in the Name of Love" B side: "Musical Pictures" or "Let Her Go Down" (New Zealand)	1983	110	78	31	61	—	—	—	—	—	29	What Goes Around...
"If the Lights Go Out" (Note: "If the Lights Go Out" was only released as a single in Continental Europe.) B side: "Someone Else's Eyes"	1983	—	—	—	—	—	—	—	—	—	—	What Goes Around...
"Casualty" (Note: "Casualty" was only released as a single in North America.) B side: "Someone Else's Eyes"	1983	—	—	—	—	—	—	—	—	—	—	What Goes Around...
"I Got What I Want" (Note: "I Got What I Want" was only released as a single in Continental Europe.) B side: "Just One Look" (1983 version)	1984	—	—	—	—	—	—	—	—	—	—	What Goes Around...
"Too Many Hearts Get Broken" B side: "You're All Woman" and "Laughter Turns To Tears"	1985	140	—	—	—	—	—	—	—	—	—	non-album single
"This Is It" B side: "You Gave Me Strength" and "You're All Woman"	1987	118	—	—	—	—	—	—	—	—	—	non-album single
"Reunion of the Heart" B side: "Too Many Hearts Get Broken"	1987	124	—	—	—	—	—	—	—	—	—	non-album single
"Stand by Me" (Note: "Stand by Me" was only released as a single in Germany.) B side: "For What It's Worth, I'm Sorry"	1988	—	—	—	58	—	—	—	—	—	—	non-album single
"Shine Silently" (Note: "Shine Silently" was only released as a single in Continental Europe.) B side: "Your Eyes"	1988	—	—	—	—	—	—	—	—	—	—	non-album single
"He Ain't Heavy, He's My Brother" (re-release) B side: "'Cos You Like To Love Me" or "Carrie"	1988	1	—	—	—	2	—	—	—	—	—	He Ain't Heavy, He's My Brother
"The Air That I Breathe" (re-release) B side: "We're Through" and "He Ain't Heavy, He's My Brother"	1988	60	—	—	—	30	—	—	—	—	—	Hollies
"Find Me a Family" B side: "No Rules"	1989	79	—	—	—	—	—	—	—	—	—	non-album single
"Baby Come Back" (Note: "Baby Come Back" was only released as a single in Germany.) B side: "Hillsborough"	1989	—	—	—	—	—	—	—	—	—	—	non-album single
"Purple Rain" (Note: Only several hundred copies of "Purple Rain" were pressed and were only sold at concerts.) B side: "Naomi" and "Two Shadows"	1990	—	—	—	—	—	—	—	—	—	—	non-album single
"The Woman I Love" B side: "Purple Rain (live version)"	1993	42	—	—	—	—	—	—	—	—	—	non-album single
"Hope" B side: "Shine On Me"	2005	—	—	—	—	—	—	—	—	—	—	Staying Power
"So Damn Beautiful" B side: "Too Much Too Soon"	2006	—	—	—	—	—	—	—	—	—	—	Staying Power
"—" denotes releases that did not chart or were not released in that territory.

== Notes ==
A.Originally peaked at no.3 on first release in 1969 but subsequently reached no.1 when reissued in 1988.
