= Russian Roulette (Hollies album) =

Studio album by The Hollies
- Released: December 1976
- Recorded: 14 July – 2 September 1976
- Studio: Basing Street Studios, London
- Genre: Rock, pop
- Length: 35:52
- Label: Polydor
- Producer: The Hollies

The Hollies chronology
Hollies Live Hits (1976)	Russian Roulette (1976)	A Crazy Steal (1978)

Russian Roulette is a 1976 self-produced album by English rock/pop group, the Hollies, and their 17th UK studio album. This is the band's third release in 1976 (the others being Write On and Hollies Live Hits). It was composed entirely by the group's songwriting team. The album was not issued in the US (although five of the album's ten tracks appeared on Epic Records' release, "Clarke, Hicks, Sylvester, Calvert, Elliott", issued in the North American market in 1977).

The album is a combination of pop music, guitar rock and disco (plus the Latin-styled "Draggin' My Heels"). Although the songs were not a great success in the UK, the opening disco-funk track "Wiggle That Wotsit" became a Top 20 hit in New Zealand (No. 11). It also appeared in the Dutch charts (No. 23) and reached the Swedish Top 20 (No. 19). Another track "Daddy Don't Mind" reached No. 21 on the Dutch Top 40 and No. 36 in Germany (session musician Wally Smith from Ted Heath And His Music played a trumpet solo for its bridge section).

Recording sessions were held at the Basing Street Studios, located in London's Notting Hill district. Session musicians on the album included keyboard player Peter Arnesen (from The Rubettes), percussionist Chris Karan (The Dudley Moore Trio) and a brass section made up of Jimmy Jewell, Henry Lowther and John Mumford.

Famous British art group Hipgnosis designed the album cover for Russian Roulette.

== Track listing ==
All songs composed by Allan Clarke, Tony Hicks and Terry Sylvester .

=== Side 1 ===
1. "Wiggle That Wotsit"
2. "48 Hour Parole"
3. "Thanks For the Memories"
4. "My Love"
5. "Lady of the Night"

=== Side 2 ===
1. "Russian Roulette"
2. "Draggin' My Heels"
3. "Louise"
4. "Be With You"
5. "Daddy Don't Mind"

== Personnel ==
The Hollies

- Allan Clarke — vocals, harmonica
- Tony Hicks — lead guitar, banjo, vocals
- Terry Sylvester — rhythm guitar, vocals
- Bobby Elliott — drums
- Bernie Calvert — bass guitar

Additional musicians and production

- Peter Arnesen – keyboards
- Chris Karan – percussion on "48 Hour Parole" and "Draggin' My Heels"
- Jimmy Jewell – alto and tenor saxophone on "Wiggle That Wotsit", "Lady Of The Night" and "Louise"
- Henry Lowther – trumpet on "Wiggle That Wotsit" and "48 Hour Parole"
- John Mumford – trombone on "Wiggle That Wotsit"
- Wally Smith – trombone on "Daddy Don't Mind"
- Phill Brown, Rhett Davies – engineers
