= The Hollies' Greatest Hits (1973 album) =

Greatest hits album by The Hollies
- Released: April 1973
- Recorded: 1964–1971
- Genre: Pop rock, beat, psychedelic pop, rock and roll, folk rock
- Label: Epic KE-32061
- Producer: Ron Richards

The Hollies chronology
Romany (1972)	The Hollies' Greatest Hits (1973)	Out on the Road (1973)

Professional ratings
Review scores
Source	Rating
Christgau's Record Guide	A−

The Hollies' Greatest Hits is a compilation of singles by the Hollies, released on Epic Records in April 1973. It includes hit singles by the group on both the Epic and Imperial labels over a time span of 1965 to 1971. It spent seven weeks on the Billboard 200 charts, peaking at number 156.

== Content ==
The group's work was initially released on Imperial Records in the United States, then a subsidiary of Liberty Records, until the latter merged with United Artists Records and the Imperial imprint was discontinued. In 1967, the Hollies signed with Epic in the U.S., and this compilation appeared six years after the group's previous, featuring hits for Epic as well as several from the Imperial period.

Since the group did not figure prominently on the American singles chart until late 1965, this compilation misses songs that had been big hits for the Hollies in the United Kingdom such as "Stay," "Here I Go Again," and "I'm Alive." The album consists of every Top 40 hit enjoyed by the band in the United States with the exception of the number 40 hit "Jennifer Eccles" from 1968 and their cover of "Stop! In the Name of Love" from 1983. Nine of the tracks feature founding member Graham Nash during his tenure in the band through 1968. "He Ain't Heavy, He's My Brother," "Long Cool Woman in a Black Dress," and "Long Dark Road" were all released on Epic after his departure.

The front cover consists of a collage referring to all twelve tracks. Greatest Hits was reissued on compact disc by Legacy Records on March 26, 2002. The remastered version added a bonus track, "The Air That I Breathe" from 1974, which was the Hollies' last top ten song in the U.S.

== Track listing ==
Chart positions taken from the Billboard Hot 100.

=== Side one ===
No.	Title	Writer(s)	Chart peak	Length
1.	"Bus Stop" (1966)	Graham Gouldman	No. 5	2:53
2.	"Carrie Anne" (1967)	Allan Clarke, Tony Hicks, Graham Nash	No. 9	2:53
3.	"Stop Stop Stop" (1966)	Allan Clarke, Tony Hicks, Graham Nash	No. 7	2:50
4.	"Look Through Any Window" (1965)	Graham Gouldman, Charles Silverman	No. 32	2:16
5.	"Dear Eloise" (1967)	Allan Clarke, Tony Hicks, Graham Nash	No. 50	3:03
6.	"Long Cool Woman in a Black Dress" (1971)	Allan Clarke, Roger Cook, Roger Greenaway	No. 2	3:16

=== Side two ===
No.	Title	Writer(s)	Chart peak	Length
1.	"He Ain't Heavy, He's My Brother" (1969)	Bobby Scott, Bob Russell	No. 7	4:19
2.	"Just One Look" (1967 reissue)	Doris Payne, Gregory Carroll	No. 44	2:28
3.	"King Midas in Reverse" (1967)	Graham Nash	No. 51	3:05
4.	"Pay You Back with Interest" (1967)	Allan Clarke, Tony Hicks, Graham Nash	No. 28	2:40
5.	"Long Dark Road" (1971)	Tony Hicks, Kenny Lynch	No. 26	4:19
6.	"On a Carousel" (1967)	Allan Clarke, Tony Hicks, Graham Nash	No. 11	3:13

=== 2002 bonus track ===
No.	Title	Writer(s)	Chart peak	Length
13.	"The Air That I Breathe" (1974)	Albert Hammond, Mike Hazlewood	No. 6	3:58

== Personnel ==
- Allan Clarke — vocals, harmonica, guitar
- Tony Hicks — lead guitar, banjo, vocals
- Bobby Elliott — drums
- Bernie Calvert — bass all tracks except "Look Through Any Window" and "Just One Look"
- Graham Nash — vocals, rhythm guitar on "Bus Stop," "Carrie Anne," "Stop Stop Stop," "Look Through Any Window," "Dear Eloise," "Just One Look," "King Midas in Reverse," "Pay You Back with Interest," and "On a Carousel"
- Terry Sylvester — rhythm guitar, vocals on "Long Cool Woman in a Black Dress," "He Ain't Heavy, He's My Brother," "Long Dark Road," and "The Air That I Breathe"
- Eric Haydock — bass on "Look Through Any Window" and "Just One Look"

== Production personnel ==
- Ron Richards — producer
- Bob Irwin — compact disc producer
- Vic Anesini — remastering engineer

== Certifications ==
Region	Certification	Certified units/sales
United States (RIAA)	Gold	500,000^{^}
^{^} Shipments figures based on certification alone.
