= The Hollies: 20 Golden Greats =

Greatest hits album by The Hollies
- Released: 1978
- Studio: EMI Abbey Road
- Label: EMI
- Producer: Ron Richards

The Hollies: 20 Golden Greats is a compilation album by The Hollies, CDP 7 46238 2, produced in 1978 by EMI by Ron Richards. The album cover's subtitle is "20 great sounds that grew out of the North." The album peaked at No. 2 in the UK albums chart.

== Track listing ==
1. "The Air That I Breathe"
2. "Carrie Anne"
3. "Bus Stop"
4. "Listen To Me"
5. "Look Through Any Window"
6. "I Can't Let Go"
7. "Long Cool Woman In A Black Dress"
8. "Here I Go Again"
9. "I Can't Tell The Bottom From The Top"
10. "I'm Alive"
11. "Yes I Will"
12. "Stay"
13. "Sorry Suzanne"
14. "Gasoline Alley Bred"
15. "We're Through"
16. "Jennifer Eccles"
17. "Stop Stop Stop"
18. "On a Carousel"
19. "Just One Look"
20. "He Ain't Heavy, He's My Brother"
