= What Goes Around =

"What Goes Around" may refer to:

- "What Goes Around", a song by Big Sean from his 2011 album Finally Famous
- "What Goes Around", a song by Nas from his 2001 album Stillmatic
- "What Goes Around", a song by Ringo Starr from his 1992 album Time Takes Time
- What Goes Around (Dave Holland album), 2002
- What Goes Around (Statik Selektah album), 2014
- What Goes Around..., a 1983 album by The Hollies
- What Goes Around - Greatest & Latest, a 1995 album by Suzi Quatro
- What Goes Around Comes Around, a 1975 album by Waylon Jennings
- What Goes Around Comes around, a 1989 song by Joe Raposo from the Shining Time Station episode Just Wild About Harry's Workshop
- "What Goes Around... Comes Around", a 2006 song by Justin Timberlake
