= Confessions of the Mind =

1970 album by The Hollies

Studio album by The Hollies
- Released: November 1970
- Recorded: November 1969 – 4 May 1970
- Studio: Abbey Road Studios, maybe London
- Genre: Rock, pop
- Length: 39:13
- Label: UK: Parlophone PCS 7116; US: Epic E 30255 (Moving Finger)
- Producer: Ron Richards

The Hollies chronology
Hollies Sing Hollies (1969)	Confessions of the Mind (1970)	Distant Light (1971)

Professional ratings
Review scores
Source	Rating
Allmusic -	3/5 stars
Christgau's Record Guide	C+
Sounds	2/5 stars

Confessions of the Mind is the tenth studio album by the English rock and pop band the Hollies, released in November 1970. It was released in the United States as Moving Finger, with a different track sequence and the tracks "Separated" and "I Wanna Shout" replaced with the Clarke/Sylvester penned "Marigold: Gloria Swansong" saved from the previous album (Hollies Sing Hollies) and "Gasoline Alley Bred". In Germany, it was released by Hansa as Move On with an alternate track sequence with "Gasoline Alley Bred" added. The UK version peaked at number 30 in the charts and the US version at number 183.

== Overview and recording ==
Nearly all of the songs were written either by guitarist Tony Hicks or by the songwriting team of Allan Clarke and Terry Sylvester. Tony Hicks revealed in an interview that the band at this time was influenced by the style of rivals such as Jethro Tull and Crosby, Stills, Nash & Young. "Our songwriting has also undergone change," Tony said to Disc and Music Echo. "I used to write about love mainly, but now I choose more general subjects. I’m writing about worldly affairs and more important issues. They mean so much more." Originally, the album was to open with a poetry reading by drummer Bobby Elliott in the style of The Moody Blues' albums. The track "Bobby's Prologue" was even recorded, but the idea was eventually abandoned. The Hollies began a work on the album in early November 1969, with recording sessions lasting until May 1970. The basis of the opening track "Survival of the Fittest", co-written by Graham Nash, was recorded in August 1969, still with Nash in the studio, but his vocals were later replaced with Terry Sylvester's. The Hollies worked on Hicks's "Too Young To Be Married" during the sessions of the previous album Hollies Sing Hollies, but did not complete it then. "Isn't It Nice?" and bluesy "Perfect Lady Housewife", both written by Clarke and Terry Sylvester, were older tunes from the abandoned stage musical Oh Flux!. During the recording process, several other songs were made and released as singles ("I Can't Tell the Bottom from the Top", B-sides "Mad Professor Blyth" and "Dandelion Wine"), some songs remained in the archives and were released years later on various compilations ("Sign of the Times", "Eleanor's Castle") and some remain unreleased to this day ("Bobby's Prologue", "Snow on Heather Moon", re-recording of Clarke-Nash's "Wings"). Keyboardist Reg Dwight (soon to be known as Elton John) participated in the recording of the album, playing on the songs "Perfect Lady Housewife" and the single "I Can't Tell the Bottom from the Top".

== Release and reception ==
The LP was packaged in a plain black and white cover with the album title and The Hollies name (and lyrics on the back). Confessions of the Mind had mostly positive reviews, Reveille (newspaper) called the LP "an outstanding album on which all of the songs are good", and reaching the UK Top 30. However, the original release of the album had an insert with a color photograph of the band. With the Top 10 hit "I Can't Tell the Bottom from the Top" as the lead single from these sessions, none of the songs on the album were selected for another 45 release in the UK or the US, although "Too Young To Be Married" was issued as a single in many countries and became a No. 1 single in Australia (at 3:13, with the guitar bridge omitted), New Zealand and Malaysia (the single would have been certified gold). A live version of the song appeared on the concert album "Hollies Live Hits" released in March 1977. Another album track "Man Without A Heart" was released as a single in the Netherlands and went to No. 25.

== Track listing ==
Side one
No.	Title	Writer(s)	Length
1.	"Survival of the Fittest"	Graham Nash, Allan Clarke, Tony Hicks	3:07
2.	"Man Without a Heart"	Clarke, Terry Sylvester	2:27
3.	"Little Girl"	Tony Hicks	3:01
4.	"Isn't It Nice?"	Clarke, Sylvester	3:48
5.	"Perfect Lady Housewife"	Clarke, Sylvester	4:39
6.	"Confessions of a Mind"	Hicks	5:47

Side two
No.	Title	Writer(s)	Length
7.	"Lady Please"	Hicks	2:41
8.	"Frightened Lady"	Hicks	3:16
9.	"Too Young to Be Married"	Hicks	4:02
10.	"Separated"	Clarke	3:31
11.	"I Wanna Shout"	Clarke, Sylvester	2:54
Total length:			39:13

Bonus Tracks on 2006 re-release
No.	Title	Writer(s)	Length
12.	"I Can't Tell the Bottom from the Top"	Guy Fletcher, Doug Flett	4:17
13.	"Mad Professor Blyth"	Clarke	2:15
14.	"Gasoline Alley Bred"	Roger Cook, Roger Greenaway, Tony Macaulay	3:54
15.	"Dandelion Wine"	Hicks	2:45
16.	"Hey Willy"	Cook, Clarke, Greenaway	3:32
17.	"Row the Boat Together"	Clarke	2:19
Total length:			19:02

== Moving Finger ==
Moving Finger

Studio album by The Hollies
- Released: 21 December 1970
- Recorded: 11 September 1969 – 29 July 1970
- Studio: Abbey Road Studios, London
- Genre: Rock, pop
- Length: 41:46
- Label: Epic Records E 30255
- Producer: Ron Richards, The Hollies

The Hollies U.S. chronology
He Ain't Heavy, He's My Brother (1969)	Moving Finger (1970)	Distant Light (1972)

Moving Finger is the tenth US album by the Hollies, released on Epic Records in stereo (E 30255) on 21 December 1970. It omitted two songs from the UK Confessions of the Mind track listing, "Separated" and "I Wanna Shout", and were both replaced by "Marigold: Gloria Swansong" (reserved from Hollies Sing Hollies) and "Gasoline Alley Bred".

Side one
No.	Title	Writer(s)	Length
1.	"Survival of the Fittest"	Allan Clarke, Tony Hicks, Graham Nash	3:03
2.	"Confessions of a Mind"	Hicks	5:42
3.	"Lady Please"	Hicks	2:37
4.	"Little Girl"	Hicks	2:56
5.	"Too Young to Be Married"	Hicks	3:58
6.	"Man Without a Heart"	Clarke, Sylvester	2:23

Side two
No.	Title	Writer(s)	Length
7.	"Isn't it Nice"	Clarke, Sylvester	3:45
8.	"Frightened Lady"	Hicks	3:11
9.	"Marigold: Gloria Swansong"	Clarke, Sylvester	5:25
10.	"Perfect Lady Housewife"	Clarke, Sylvester	4:35
11.	"Gasoline Alley Bred"	Cook, Greenaway, Macaulay	3:54

== Personnel ==
Tracks 2, 6, 8, and 9 include accompaniment arranged and conducted by Johnny Scott.

The Hollies

- Allan Clarke – vocals, guitar, harmonica
- Tony Hicks – guitar, vocals
- Terry Sylvester – guitar, vocals
- Bernie Calvert – bass, keyboards
- Bobby Elliott – drums
- Graham Nash – rhythm guitar (on "Survival of the Fittest")
