= Hollies' Greatest =

Greatest hits album by the Hollies
- Released: 1 August 1968
- Recorded: 1963–1968
- Length: 37:33
- Label: Parlophone
- Producer: Ron Richards

The Hollies chronology
Butterfly (1967)	Hollies' Greatest (1968)	Hollies Sing Dylan (1969)

Hollies' Greatest is the only number one album in the UK by British band the Hollies. It was released shortly before Graham Nash's departure from the Hollies and was intended to include all of their British hit singles with Nash, as well as filling in for the lack of an original LP by the group in 1968. Only 3 of the 14 songs on the album – "Stay", "I Can't Let Go" and "Stop! Stop! Stop!" had previously been released on UK albums.

It spent seven weeks at the top of the chart in 1968. In total, it spent 27 weeks in the British LP chart, and is the most successful album by the Hollies.

The version of "Yes I Will" that appears on the stereo version of this album is not the 1965 hit single version, but an earlier and previously unreleased recording from 1964 – the result of an administrative error at EMI which was not noticed until after the album had been released. It features a completely different guitar break by Tony Hicks, and a different introduction.

== Track listing ==
All songs by Clarke-Hicks-Nash, unless otherwise noted.

Side one

1. "I Can't Let Go" § (Chip Taylor, Al Gorgoni)
2. "Bus Stop" (Graham Gouldman)
3. "We're Through" § (Ransford AKA Clarke-Hicks-Nash)
4. "Carrie Anne"
5. "Here I Go Again" § (Mort Shuman, Clive Westlake)
6. "King Midas in Reverse"
7. "Yes I Will" § (Gerry Goffin, Russ Titelman)

Side two

1. "I'm Alive" § (Clint Ballard Jr.)
2. "Just One Look" § (Gregory Carroll, Doris Payne)
3. "On a Carousel"
4. "Stay" § (Maurice Williams)
5. "Look Through Any Window" § (Gouldman, Charles Silverman)
6. "Stop Stop Stop"
7. "Jennifer Eccles" (Clarke-Nash)

== Personnel ==
- Allan Clarke – vocals, harmonica, guitar
- Tony Hicks – lead guitar, vocals
- Graham Nash – rhythm guitar, vocals
- Bobby Elliott – drums
- Eric Haydock – bass guitar on §
- Bernie Calvert – bass guitar

== Charts ==
Chart performance for Hollies' Greatest
Chart (1968–1969)	Peak position
German Albums (Offizielle Top 100)	20
Norwegian Albums (VG-lista)	18
UK Albums (OCC)	1
