= Five Three One - Double Seven O Four =

Studio album by the Hollies
- Released: March 1979
- Recorded: 16 August 1978 – 18 January 1979
- Studio: Abbey Road Studios, London
- Genre: Rock, pop
- Length: 44:14
- Label: Polydor
- Producer: Ron Richards

The Hollies chronology
A Crazy Steal (1978)	Five Three One - Double Seven O Four (1979)	Buddy Holly (1980)

Five Three One - Double Seven O Four is the 19th UK studio album by the English rock/pop group the Hollies. When rendered as digits, the album title is the band's name upside down in digital number view (it would appear like this: hOLLIES or 5317704). The idea is credited to guitarist Terry Sylvester.

== Overview and recording ==
Singer Allan Clarke left The Hollies after the release of their previous album A Crazy Steal in 1978. During his absence, the band worked with Gary Brooker of Procol Harum. They recorded his (and Keith Reid) song "Harlequin" with B. J. Wilson on drums, due to the illness of the Hollies’ drummer Bobby Elliott. The group even considered offering Gary Brooker the lead singer position, but Allan Clarke eventually returned to the group and the remainder of the album was recorded. Brooker later recorded the opening track "Say It Ain't So, Jo", having heard it on the sessions for this album (it was also covered by Roger Daltrey).

The Hollies worked with their longtime producer Ron Richards, who was seriously ill at the time and left the music business after completing the album. Drummer Bobby Elliott later stated: "The massive consoles at Abbey Road were now computerised, and engineer Mike Jarratt had a 16- and a 24-track machine linked together. Very impressive, but advancing technology, ironically, meant that it was now taking much longer to mix a Hollies track". The band recorded several new songs by various authors (Murray Head, Tony Hymas, Pete Brown, David Pomeranz) and only one, "Satelite Three", written by singer Allan Clarke (and his songwriting partner Gary Benson). The album contained mostly ballads, occasionally country music ("Stormy Waters") or mid-tempo funk ("Boys in the Band"). The song "It's Everyone Of Us" was later featured in the stage musical, Time and Cliff Richard recorded his version in 1985. In 2003, the Hollies included the song in their concert setlist. Two more tunes were omitted from the final album: "Sanctuary" (released in 1988) and "Lovin' You Ain't Easy" (released in 1998). Allan Clarke sang lead on all tracks except "Boys in the Band" and "Harlequin", which were both sung by Terry Sylvester.

== Release and reception ==
The Space-themed sleeve design was fashioned by Jack Wood (who made artwork for Status Quo, Thin Lizzy or The Sensational Alex Harvey Band). LP was issued by Polydor in the UK in March 1979, but the album was overshadowed by the success of the compilation, The Hollies: 20 Golden Greats, which reached No. 2 in the UK Albums Chart shortly before. 5317704 was also released in Australia, Canada, Netherlands, New Zealand, Ireland, France, Scandinavia, and Germany. Although the Hollies went on tour to promote both albums, 5317704 failed to chart. The extracted single "Something to Live For" (originally recorded by Jack Bruce on his LP How's Tricks) also failed. The music magazine Melody Maker named the record "terminally depressing".

== Track listing ==
=== Side 1 ===
1. "Say It Ain't So, Jo" (Murray Head)
2. "Maybe It's Dawn" (Tony Hymas, Pete Brown)
3. "Song of the Sun" (Tony Hymas, Pete Brown)
4. "Harlequin" (Gary Brooker, Keith Reid) Lead vocal: Terry Sylvester; Drums: B.J. Wilson
5. "When I'm Yours" (Murray Head)

=== Side 2 ===
1. "Something to Live For" (Tony Hymas, Pete Brown)
2. "Stormy Waters" (David M. White) Harmonica: Allan Clarke
3. "Boys in the Band" (Pete Brown) Lead vocal: Terry Sylvester
4. "Satellite Three" (Allan Clarke, Gary Benson)
5. "It's in Everyone of Us" (David Pomeranz)

== Personnel ==
- Allan Clarke – lead vocals, guitar, harmonica
- Terry Sylvester – guitar, vocals
- Tony Hicks – guitar, banjo, mandolin, bass, keyboards, vocals
- Bernie Calvert – bass, keyboards
- Bobby Elliott – drums
- Pete Wingfield – keyboards
- Hans Peter Arnesen – keyboards
- Gary Brooker – keyboards (vocals on "Harlequin", starting at 3:15)
- Tony Hymas – keyboards, string and horn arrangements
- B.J. Wilson – drums
