= Romany (album) =

Studio album by The Hollies
- Released: November 1972
- Recorded: 13 April–30 August 1972
- Studios: EMI Studios, Abbey Road, London
- Genres: Rock, pop
- Length: 45:29
- Labels: UK: Polydor LP 2383144; US: Epic KE 31992
- Producer: The Hollies

The Hollies chronology
| Distant Light (1971) | Romany (1972) | The Hollies' Greatest Hits (1973) |

Professional ratings
Review scores
| Source | Rating |
|---|---|
| Allmusic | 3/5 stars |
| Christgau's Record Guide | C− |

Romany is the twelfth studio album by the English rock and pop band the Hollies. Released in November 1972, it is the band's first studio album to not feature lead singer Allan Clarke, who had left the band to embark on a solo career. He was replaced by Swedish singer Mikael Rickfors. In the opinion of contemporary and retrospective critics, this album moved the band further away from the original vocal harmony style of Allan Clarke, Tony Hicks and Graham Nash.

The album only features two songwriting contributions from band members: one song was co-written by Hicks, who had been a co-writer of a significant proportion of the band's material since their second album; and another was written by Rickfors. Previous albums, with the exception of Hollies Sing Dylan and the band's debut album, had much more original material.

The US Epic Records version of the album, which reached number 84 on the Billboard 200, omitted the track "Lizzy and the Rainman", and has a slightly altered side-one track order. The album failed to chart in the UK. The cover of Romany renders, as a winter scene, the summer location depicted on the sleeve of the group's previous album Distant Light.

As the album was nearing release the members of the group were getting nervous and made at least three changes in the album, announced a single before retracting it, which delayed the album for three months. Due to the success of the previous album and its smash hit single, the LP initially sold well in the US. It has been claimed that, upon its release, Romany sold six times more copies in the first week in the US than any previous Hollies album had sold in a year, and that it also received more US FM airplay than the band had ever received in their previous nine years.

== Track listing ==
=== UK version ===
Side one

1. "Won't We Feel Good That Morning" (Day, Leslie)
2. "Touch" (Mikael Rickfors)
3. "Words Don't Come Easy" (Colin Jennings)
4. "Magic Woman Touch" (Colin Jennings, Garth Watt-Roy)
5. "Lizzy and the Rainman" (Larry Henley, Kenny O'Dell)
6. "Down River" (David Ackles)

Side two

1. "Slow Down" (Day, Leslie)
2. "Delaware Taggett and the Outlaw Boys" (Colin Jennings)
3. "Jesus Was a Cross Maker" (Judee Sill)
4. "Romany" (Colin Jennings)
5. "Blue in the Morning" (Kenny Lynch, Tony Hicks)
6. "Courage of Your Convictions" (Alan Rush, Randy Cullers)

=== US version ===
Side one

1. "Magic Woman Touch" (Colin Jennings, Garth Watt-Roy)
2. "Touch" (Mikael Rickfors)
3. "Words Don't Come Easy" (Colin Jennings)
4. "Won't We Feel Good" (M. Leslie, B. Day)
5. "Down River" (David Ackles)

Side two

1. "Slow Down" (M. Leslie, B. Day)
2. "Delaware Taggett and the Outlaw Boys" (Colin Jennings)
3. "Jesus Was a Cross Maker" (Judee Sill)
4. "Romany" (Colin Jennings)
5. "Blue in the Morning" (Kenny Lynch, Tony Hicks)
6. "Courage of Your Convictions" (Alan Rush, Randy Cullers)

== Remastered CD ==
The album was released on CD by EMI in 2007, featuring the (remastered) 12 tracks from the original UK release plus the following bonus tracks:

1. "The Baby" – 2003 Digital Remaster (Chip Taylor)
2. "Magic Woman Touch" – Acoustic Version 2007 Digital Remaster (Colin Jennings, Watt-Roy)
3. "Indian Girl" – 2007 Digital Remaster (Terry Sylvester)
4. "If It Wasn't For The Reason That I Love You" (Cooke, Greenaway)
5. "Papa Rain" (Colin Jennings)
6. "Witchy Woman" (Don Henley, Bernie Leadon)
7. "Oh Granny" – Terry Sylvester Version 2007 Digital Remaster (Terry Sylvester)
8. "I Had A Dream" (Terry Sylvester)

== Personnel ==
- Mikael Rickfors - lead vocals
- Tony Hicks - guitar, backing vocals, lead vocals on "Blue In The Morning"
- Terry Sylvester - guitar, bass, backing vocals, lead vocals on "Lizzy and the Rainman" and "Jesus Was a Cross Maker"
- Bernie Calvert - bass, piano
- Bobby Elliott - drums

Technical

- Alan Parsons, Peter Bown – recording engineer
- Colin Elgie, Hipgnosis – cover art
