= What Goes Around... (Hollies album) =

Studio album by The Hollies
- Released: July 1983
- Recorded: 10 September 1981 – 2 February 1983
- Studios: Rudy Records (Los Angeles), Audio International, White House Studios, Riverside Studios
- Genre: Pop
- Length: 32:36
- Label: WEA
- Producers: The Hollies, Graham Nash, Paul Bliss, Stanley Johnston

The Hollies chronology
Buddy Holly (1980)	What Goes Around... (1983)	Staying Power (2006)

What Goes Around... is the 21st studio album by English rock/pop group, the Hollies. It includes their version of The Supremes' "Stop! In the Name of Love", which became their last US hit single. The Hollies reunited with Graham Nash (member of the Crosby, Stills, Nash & Young at the time) for this album and for the following US tour. The LP was the band's first and last album with Nash since Butterfly (1967) and also their last one with lead singer Allan Clarke. Among the guest musicians is Brian Chatton who was formerly keyboardist for The Warriors with Jon Anderson, and Flaming Youth with Phil Collins.

== Overview and recording ==
In 1981, the current line-up of The Hollies broke up after the departure of long-time guitarist Terry Sylvester and bassist Bernie Calvert. Remaining members singer Allan Clarke, guitarist Tony Hicks and drummer Bobby Elliott invited founding Hollies' members Eric Haydock (bass) and Graham Nash to perform on the British TV show Top Of The Pops, where they played the current medley-hit "Holliedaze". Graham Nash then joined the band in September 1981 for a studio recording session of the song "Something Ain't Right" and contributed some harmonies. The collaboration suited the band so well that they decided to record a full album with Nash. Backing tracks were recorded in the UK in March and May 1982 (the bass parts were recorded by Alan Tarney, Andy Brown and Steve Stroud), vocals with Graham Nash were added in Los Angeles in February 1983. Half of the album was written by keyboardist and songwriter Paul Bliss (later a sidesman with The Moody Blues), and "If the Lights Go Out" was written by Mike Batt. The album also features a re-recording of the Hollies' sixties hit "Just One Look".

== Reception ==
A remake of the Supremes' chart-topping hit "Stop! In the Name of Love" was chosen as the debut single. The single went up to No. 29 on Billboard charts, No. 31 in Canada's RPM charts and Top 100 spots in Australia (#78) and Germany (#61). The Hollies also made a promotional video with anti-war message achieving MTV airplay. Album reached No. 90 in the US. The band went on an American tour, during which Graham Nash joined them again. A recording of the show from Kings Island Amusement Park in Cincinnati was released as "Archive Alive" CD in 1997 (later appearing as "Reunion", with the addition of two extra live tracks from What Goes Around... LP).

Professional ratings
Review scores
Source	Rating
AllMusic	2.5/5 stars

== Track listing ==
Side one
No.	Title	Writer(s)	Length
1.	"Casualty"	Paul Bliss	2:55
2.	"Take My Love and Run"	Barry Black, Brian Chatton	2:50
3.	"Say You'll Be Mine"	Paul Bliss	3:44
4.	"Something Ain't Right"	Alan Tarney, Tom Snow, Trevor Spencer	3:32
5.	"If the Lights Go Out"	Mike Batt	3:30

Side two
No.	Title	Writer(s)	Length
6.	"Stop! In the Name of Love"	Brian Holland, Lamont Dozier, Eddie Holland	3:06
7.	"I Got What I Want"	Paul Bliss, Stephen Kipner	2:33
8.	"Just One Look"	Gregory Carroll, Doris Payne	3:01
9.	"Someone Else's Eyes"	Paul Bliss	3:59
10.	"Having a Good Time"	Paul Bliss, Stephen Kipner	2:59

== Personnel ==
The Hollies

- Allan Clarke – lead vocals
- Tony Hicks – lead guitar, vocals
- Graham Nash – vocals
- Bobby Elliott – drums

with:

- Alan Tarney – rhythm guitar (track 4), bass, keyboards
- Brian Chatton – keyboards
- Paul Bliss – keyboards
- Mike Batt – keyboards (track 05)
- Andy Brown – bass
- Steve Stroud – bass
- Frank Christopher – rhythm guitar (track 10)
- Joe Lala – percussion
