= Hollies Live Hits =

Live album by The Hollies
- Released: 1976 (Germany); March 1977 (UK)
- Recorded: 24 January 1976–28 January 1976
- Venue: Christchurch Town Hall, New Zealand
- Genre: Rock, pop
- Length: 59:00
- Label: Polydor Records
- Producer: The Hollies

The Hollies chronology
Write On (1976)	Hollies Live Hits (1976)	Russian Roulette (1976)

German alternative cover
- Hollies Live (1976)

Hollies Live Hits (stylized as Hollies. Live Hits.) is the first live album by the Hollies, released in 1976. It reached number four on the UK Album Chart.

== Overview and recording ==
The Hollies had already planned to release a live album with Graham Nash in 1968, but the idea was not realised at the time. The recording of the show for the Hollies Live Hits album was made during a number of shows in New Zealand in January 1976. In addition to many of the band's hits from the 1960s ("Just One Look", "I Can't Let Go", "Bus Stop", "Carrie Anne" and "He Ain't Heavy, He's My Brother"), the LP also included songs from more recent Hollies albums such as Hollies (1974), Another Night (1975) and Write On (1976). Two recorded songs from the show were not used for the LP ("Boulder to Birmingham" and "Amazing Grace").

== Reception ==
The album was advertised on British television and the original UK album cover art referred directly to the advertisement. In other countries, however, the album had a completely different cover, featuring a photo of the Hollies on stage. The album reached the top five in the UK Album chart, stayed there for 12 weeks and the Hollies were awarded a silver disc for this album.

== Track listing ==
Side one
No.	Title	Writer(s)	Length
1.	"I Can't Let Go"	Chip Taylor, Al Gorgoni	3:08
2.	"Just One Look"	Gregory Carroll, Doris Payne	2:51
3.	"I Can't Tell the Bottom from the Top"	Guy Fletcher, Doug Flett	3:31
4.	"Bus Stop"	Graham Gouldman	3:27
5.	"Another Night"	Allan Clarke, Tony Hicks, Terry Sylvester	3:40
6.	"4th of July, Asbury Park (Sandy)"	Bruce Springsteen	4:17
7.	"Star"	Clarke, Hicks, Sylvester	3:59
8.	"My Island"	Clarke, Hicks, Sylvester	4:27

Side two
No.	Title	Writer(s)	Length
1.	"I'm Down"	Clarke, Hicks, Sylvester	4:16
2.	"Stop Stop Stop"	Clarke, Hicks, Graham Nash	3:09
3.	"Long Cool Woman in a Black Dress"	Clarke, Roger Cook, Roger Greenaway	4:04
4.	"Carrie Anne"	Clarke, Hicks, Nash	3:05
5.	"The Air That I Breathe"	Albert Hammond, Mike Hazlewood	4:46
6.	"Too Young to Be Married"	Tony Hicks	5:20
7.	"He Ain't Heavy, He's My Brother"	Bobby Scott, Bob Russell	4:56

== Personnel ==
The Hollies

- Allan Clarke – lead vocals, guitar on Long Cool Woman ("This one features Allan on lead guitar!" heard on LP)
- Tony Hicks – lead guitar
- Terry Sylvester – rhythm guitar
- Bernie Calvert – bass
- Bobby Elliott – drums

Additional personnel

- Pete Wingfield – piano, ARP synthesizer, VOX String machine
