= Distant Light (Hollies album) =

Studio album by The Hollies
- Released: 8 October 1971 (UK); April 1972 (US)
- Recorded: 14 April–30 July 1971
- Studio: AIR Studios, London
- Length: 44:14
- Label: UK: Parlophone PAS 10005; US: Epic KE 30958
- Producer: Ron Richards, The Hollies

The Hollies chronology
Confessions of the Mind (1970)	Distant Light (1971)	Romany (1972)

Singles from Distant Light
- 1. "Long Cool Woman in a Black Dress" Released: April 1972; 2. "Long Dark Road" Released: October 1972

Professional ratings
Review scores
Source	Rating
AllMusic	3/5 stars
Christgau's Record Guide	C+

Distant Light is a 1971 album by the Hollies. It is their 11th UK album, their last to be released before the brief departure of lead vocalist and founding member Allan Clarke (who was absent on the following album and returned for their 1974 self-titled album), and reputedly is the first album to have come out of AIR Studios. The album produced two hit singles: "Long Cool Woman in a Black Dress" (co-written by Allan Clarke), which peaked at number two in the US and number 32 in the UK; and "Long Dark Road" (co-written by Tony Hicks), which reached number 26 in the US. The US version of the album peaked at number 21 on the album chart. The summer scene portrayed on the cover would be rendered as a winter scene on the sleeve of the next Hollies album, Romany.

== Overview and recording ==
The album was the band's biggest experiment to date. The use of saxophones, female choruses, and more complex compositions in the style of the Moody Blues ("You Know The Score"), was very unusual for the Hollies. The lyrics were more serious – containing, for example, anti-war messages ("You Know The Score" or "Promised Land") or dramatic stories ("What A Life I've Led", "Hold On"). Only a few songs were in the traditional Hollies style and sound ("Long Dark Road", "A Little Thing Like Love", "To Do with Love").

The recording featured guest appearances by pianist Gary Brooker (Procol Harum), guitarist Mick Abrahams (Jethro Tull) and saxophonist Jim Jewell. Vocals were sung by Madeline Bell, Doris Troy and Liza Strike. The LP was released on 8 October 1971 in a gatefold sleeve with a painted woodland and summer scene by Colin Elgie of Hipgnosis. The idea was conceived by Storm Thorgerson, famous for his work with Pink Floyd. There were many hidden messages and a good deal of symbolism and, years later, the artist admitted that there were so many that he couldn't remember some of them. The inside cover art consisted of pictures of the band members taken at a house party at Tony Hicks's apartment.

== Release and reception ==
The band performed the first three songs from the album ("What a Life I've Led" and "Look What We've Got" and "Long Cool Woman in a Black Dress") live on the television show Meet the Hollies on 25 July 1971. Later, they performed "Long Cool Woman in a Black Dress" and "A Little Thing Like Love" again on another TV show, It's Lulu. The album was highly praised by critics – Record Mirror wrote that "You could use the word sensational about The Hollies' new album" – and it became the group's biggest success in America (including their records with Graham Nash). However, in their native UK, the LP was only a modest success for the band.

The album's biggest hit was the song "Long Cool Woman in a Black Dress", composed by Allan Clarke and Roger Cook (whose co-writer Roger Greenaway was also credited by verbal agreement between the two songwriters). The single reached No. 2 in the US, No. 1 in Canada and No. 32 in the UK; it was the Hollies' biggest American hit. The song "Long Dark Road" was also released as a single in the US and Canada, reaching No. 26 and No. 24 respectively.

== Track listing ==
All tracks composed by Tony Hicks and Kenny Lynch, except where indicated.

Side one

1. "What a Life I've Led" – 3:58
2. "Look What We've Got" – 4:07
3. "Hold On" (Allan Clarke) – 4:07
4. "Pull Down the Blind" (Terry Sylvester) – 3:30
5. "To Do with Love" – 3:29
6. "Promised Land" – 4:20

Side two

1. "Long Cool Woman in a Black Dress" (Allan Clarke, Roger Cook, Roger Greenaway) – 3:19
2. "You Know the Score" (Allan Clarke, Terry Sylvester) – 5:37
3. "Cable Car" (Terry Sylvester) – 4:25
4. "A Little Thing Like Love" (Allan Clarke, Tony Macaulay) – 3:19
5. "Long Dark Road" – 4:16

== Personnel ==
The Hollies

- Allan Clarke – lead vocals and backing vocals, lead guitar on "Long Cool Woman"
- Tony Hicks – lead guitars and bass
- Terry Sylvester – rhythm guitars
- Bernie Calvert – bass
- Bobby Elliott – drums

with:

- John Scott – arrangements, conductor
- Gary Brooker – organ and piano on "Long Dark Road"
- Mick Abrahams – pedal steel guitar on "What A Life I've Led"
- Jim Jewell – saxophone
- Madeline Bell, Doris Troy and Liza Strike – backing vocals on "What A Life I've Led"

== Chart positions ==
Album

Year	Chart	Position
1972	Billboard Pop Albums	21
