= Hollies Sing Hollies =

1969 studio album by The Hollies

Studio album by The Hollies
- Released: November 1969
- Recorded: 23 June–10 October 1969
- Studio: EMI Studios, London
- Genre: Rock, pop
- Length: 38:19
- Label: UK: Parlophone PCS 7092
- Producer: Ron Richards

The Hollies chronology
Hollies Sing Dylan (1969)	Hollies Sing Hollies (1969)	Confessions of the Mind (1970)

Professional ratings
Review scores
Source	Rating
Allmusic -	3/5 stars
Allmusic -	3/5 stars

Hollies Sing Hollies is the ninth studio album released in the UK by the Hollies. It was released in November 1969 by Parlophone. It was their second album that year, coming six months after an entire album of Bob Dylan covers. It was their first album of original songs since the departure of Graham Nash. It was also the second album by the Hollies to include Terry Sylvester and the first to include his songs, as well as an instrumental by bassist Bernie Calvert. The US version, titled "He Ain't Heavy, He's My Brother" (with a different cover photo), included the hit single of the same name, while omitting the tracks "Soldier's Dilemma" and "Marigold/Gloria Swansong". The UK album did not chart, but its US version peaked at number 32.

== Track listing ==
All lead vocals by Allan Clarke except “Look At Life,” sung by Tony Hicks, and the instrumental “Reflections of a Long Time Past”

Side one
No.	Title	Writer(s)	Length
1.	"Why Didn't You Believe?"	Terry Sylvester, Allan Clarke	3:33
2.	"Don't Give Up Easily"	Tony Hicks	2:18
3.	"Look at Life"	Sylvester, Clarke	2:31
4.	"Please Sign Your Letters"	Sylvester, Clarke, Hicks	3:45
5.	"My Life Is Over with You"	Clarke, Hicks	3:20
6.	"Please Let Me Please"	Hicks, Clarke	3:13

Side two
No.	Title	Writer(s)	Length
7.	"Do You Believe in Love?"	Sylvester, Clarke, Hicks	3:44
8.	"Soldier's Dilemma"	Clarke	2:57
9.	"Marigold/Gloria Swansong"	Sylvester, Clarke	5:28
10.	"You Love 'Cos You Like It"	Sylvester, Clarke	2:52
11.	"Reflections of a Time Long Past"	Bernard Calvert	2:29
12.	"Goodbye Tomorrow"	Clarke	3:50

1996 remaster bonus tracks
No.	Title	Writer(s)	Length
13.	"Wings"	Allan Clarke, Graham Nash	3:02
14.	"Sorry Suzanne"	Geoff Stephens, Tony Macaulay	3:00
15.	"Not That Way at All"	Clarke	2:49
16.	"He Ain't Heavy, He's My Brother"	Bobby Scott, Bob Russell	4:18
17.	"'Cos You Like to Love Me"	Hicks	2:58
18.	"Louisiana Man"	Doug Kershaw	2:38
19.	"She Looked My Way"	Les Reed, Jackie Rae	2:40
20.	"Eleanor's Castle"	Clarke	2:39

== He Ain't Heavy, He's My Brother (US version) ==
He Ain't Heavy, He's My Brother

Studio album by The Hollies
- Released: December 1969
- Recorded: 23 June–10 October 1969
- Studio: EMI, London
- Genre: Rock, pop
- Length: 36:01
- Label: Epic BN 26538
- Producer: Ron Richards

The Hollies US chronology
Words And Music By Bob Dylan (1969)	He Ain't Heavy, He's My Brother (1969)	Moving Finger (1970)

Professional ratings
Review scores
Source	Rating
Christgau's Record Guide	B

The US version of Hollies Sing Hollies was renamed He Ain't Heavy, He's My Brother with a different full cover art, and was released in December 1969 by Epic Records. It included the hit single "He Ain't Heavy, He's My Brother" and omitted two tracks from the UK version, "Soldier's Dilemma" and "Marigold/Gloria Swansong" (the second was saved for their next US album, Moving Finger).

Side one

1. "Why Didn't You Believe?"
2. "Don't Give Up Easily"
3. "Look at Life"
4. "Please Sign Your Letters"
5. "My Life Is Over with You"
6. "Please Let Me Please"

Side two

1. "Do You Believe in Love?"
2. "He Ain't Heavy, He's My Brother"
3. "You Love 'Cos You Like It"
4. "Reflections of a Time Long Past"
5. "Goodbye Tomorrow"

== Personnel ==
The Hollies

- Allan Clarke - vocals, harmonica
- Tony Hicks - lead guitar, vocals
- Terry Sylvester - guitar, vocals
- Bernie Calvert - bass, keyboards
- Bobby Elliott - drums
