= Staying Power (The Hollies album) =

Studio album by the Hollies
- Released: 20 February 2006
- Length: 47:31
- Label: EMI
- Producers: Ray Stiles; Ian Parker

The Hollies chronology
The Ultra Selection (2005)	Staying Power (2006)	French Singles A's & B's 1966-1983 (2006)

Singles from Staying Power
- 1. "Hope" Released: 2005; 2. "So Damn Beautiful" Released: 2 February 2006

Staying Power is the twenty-second studio album by the English rock band the Hollies, released on 20 February 2006 on EMI.

== Background ==
Staying Power primarily contains writing by Rob Davis of the band Mud and Spanish singer-songwriter Enrique Iglesias.

== Release and reception ==
Professional ratings
Review scores
Source	Rating
AllMusic	4/5 stars
The Encyclopedia of Popular Music	3/5 stars

Bruce Eder wrote in an AllMusic editorial review that "The familiar Hollies sound has evolved into something a bit less distinctive -- the harmonies here aren't nearly as special, and don't feel in any way unique -- but all immensely accessible.", he commented that "For their first studio album in 23 years, the band reached back to their lean power pop sound of the early/mid-'70s, embodied by such hits as "Long Dark Road" and "Long Cool Woman (In a Black Dress)."" he does note that the new lead vocalist Peter Howarth can sound like the original lead vocalist Alan Clarke, but only when "focused properly and with the right quality lyrics", he highlights the song writing to be "also very strong throughout most of the album", although he did think the Hollies should have released Staying Power during the group's 1983 reunion, a time when the group had all the press attention. In a review for The Monday Gazette, writer Steve Ballard states: "Having seen a few members come and go[, ]it is very creditable for them to have the energy to produce such a great album.", highlighting four tracks on the album; "So Damn Beautiful", "Prove Me Wrong", "Suspended Animation", and "Emotions", the final of the four he named being his favorite. Lancashire Telegraph called it a "highly polished piece of AOR from Bobby Elliott, Tony Hicks and co." noting that "the songs are lacking in inspiration, compared with the Hollies classics.", concluding by stating that "The group still pride themselves on their vocal harmonies, but the youthful energy of the '60s and '70s just isn't there anymore." Sunderland Echo's Alistair Robinson called it fitting as one of the only bands of the 1960's still around by that time, calling it a "valiant attempt to grab the limelight again: slickly professional, perfectly pleasant middle-of-the-road pop that will go down well on the theatre tours[], but is hardly going to set the world alight".

== Track listing ==
No.	Title	Length
1.	"Hope"	3:12
2.	"So Damn Beautiful"	4:04
3.	"Prove Me Wrong"	4:08
4.	"Break Me"	3:22
5.	"Shine on Me"	4:32
6.	"Suspended Animation"	4:16
7.	"Touch Me"	3:28
8.	"Emotions"	4:06
9.	"Weakness"	3:27
10.	"Live It Up"	4:26
11.	"Yesterday's Gone"	4:42
12.	"Let Love Pass"	3:48
