= Write On (album) =

Studio album by The Hollies
- Released: January 1976
- Recorded: 9 June–18 September 1975
- Studio: EMI Studios, London
- Genre: Rock, pop
- Length: 34:32
- Label: Polydor
- Producer: The Hollies

The Hollies chronology
Another Night (1975)	Write On (1976)	Hollies Live Hits (1976)

Professional ratings
Review scores
Source	Rating
Allmusic	link

Write On is the first of two 1976 studio albums by the English rock/pop band, the Hollies, and their 16th UK studio album. Like the previous one, this album has mostly songs written by the group's songwriting team. The final track of the album is the only one not composed by them. This album was not issued in the US (although four of the album's ten tracks appeared on Epic Records' release, Clarke, Hicks, Sylvester, Calvert, Elliott, issued in the North American market in 1977).

== Overview and recording ==
The album is a combination of pop, guitar rock, country, reggae and funk music. The Hollies' producer, Ron Richards, fell ill before the main work began, so the recording engineer Peter Bown was placed in charge of production. Session musicians on the album included the keyboard players Rod Argent (from the Zombies and Argent), Hans-Peter Arnesen (from The Rubettes) and Pete Wingfield. Recording sessions were held at the Abbey Road Studios and Emison Studios in Queensway. The drummer, Bobby Elliott, later said that all of the instrumental backing tracks were recorded in one piece by the band (plus piano) with a guide vocal by Clarke, the only overdubs being lead and backing vocals and instrumental solos.

The LP was packaged in a simple, plain angular white sleeve with gold lettering and a gold image of the band members on the back.

A few songs that were recorded and intended for the album were not used. "Born to Run" by Bruce Springsteen was also recorded, but the Hollies were not satisfied with their version and it was abandoned. (The singer, Allan Clarke, released his solo version in 1975.) Another song, "Samuel", written by Clarke, was recorded and was not released until "The Hollies at Abbey Road (1973 to 1989) CD compilation in 1998.

== Reception ==
The LP missed the official Record Retailer album chart in the United Kingdom, but entered the Top 10 in the New Zealand chart (No. 9). National Rockstar called the album "one of the most skillfully released pop albums since Honky Château", and Girl About Town magazine in January 1976 wrote, "This album proves how creative and diversified one band and its music can be." On the other hand, according to Record Mirror "the Hollies have lost their touch with this one“. The BBC radio disc jockey Noel Edmonds made the LP his "album of the week" on his morning breakfast show. None of its ten tracks were issued as singles in the UK, although the opening track "Star" became a Top 10 hit in New Zealand (No. 7). The title track, "Write On", reached No. 31 on the German charts and also entered the Top 20 in South Africa. Live versions of "Star" and "My Island" appeared on the concert album Hollies Live Hits, released in March 1977.

Record World called the title track "a hard hitting harmony laced ballad".

== Track listing ==
All songs composed by Allan Clarke, Tony Hicks and Terry Sylvester except where noted.

=== Side 1 ===
1. "Star" – 3:39
2. "Write On" – 4:50
3. "Sweet Country Calling" – 3:06
4. "Love Is The Thing" – 3:45
5. "I Won't Move Over" – 3:31

=== Side 2 ===
1. "Narida" – 3:57
2. "Stranger" – 3:29
3. "Crocodile Woman (She Bites)" – 3:35
4. "My Island" 4:22
5. "There's Always Goodbye" (Randy Richards) – 4:15

French 1999 MAM Production HDCD digipack edition's bonus tracks:

1. "Boulder to Birmingham" (Emmylou Harris, Bill Danoff)
2. "Samuel" (Allan Clarke, unedited version)
3. "Star" (live)
4. "My Island" (live)
5. "Born To Run" (Bruce Springsteen) – Allan Clarke solo track

== Personnel ==
The Hollies

- Allan Clarke – lead vocals
- Tony Hicks – lead guitar
- Terry Sylvester – rhythm guitar
- Bernie Calvert – bass guitar
- Bobby Elliott – drums

with:

- Pete Wingfield – piano, organ, ARP synthesizer
- Hans-Peter Arnesen – piano, clavinet
- Rod Argent – piano and synthesizer on "Star"
- Tony Hymas – string arrangements
