= Steve Lauri =

British guitarist (born 1954)

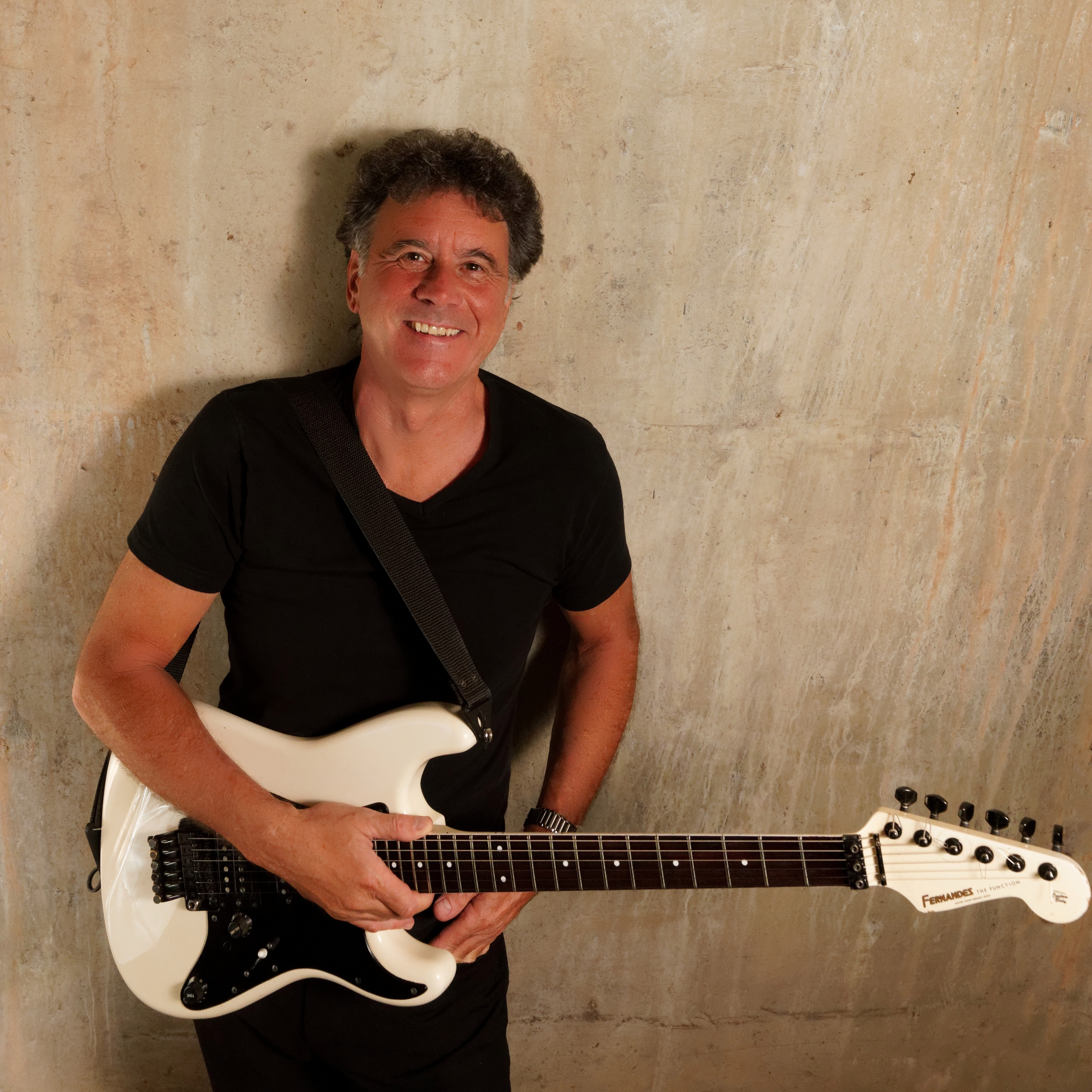
- Lauri in 2016

Background information
- Born: 26 April 1954 (age 72); London, England
- Occupations: Musician; songwriter
- Instruments: Guitar; vocals
- Years active: 1977–present
- Member of: The Hollies
- Formerly of: Cliff Richard Band

Steve Lauri (born 26 April 1954) is a British guitarist and a member of the rock/pop band The Hollies.

== Early life and education ==
Lauri was born in London. He began performing professionally in the mid-1970s.

== Career ==
Lauri started his working life as an apprentice in the avionics industry with GEC Avionics in Rochester, Kent, but quit to pursue his professional music career. Lauri worked briefly on U.S. Army and Air Force bases in Germany, and then moved on to the London pub circuit. In 1977 he joined pop disco group 5000 Volts, and the group toured the UK, Europe, Scandinavia and South Africa and had two top ten hits while Lauri was with them. They also supported the Stylistics on their British tour, including their performance at the Royal Albert Hall.

In 1979, Lauri joined the Bonnie Tyler Band as a singing guitarist, touring Europe and America to promote "It's a Heartache", Tyler's second hit single.

In 1980, Lauri joined Sprinkler, the resident band at The Green Man pub in south east London, where he performed until the mid-1980s, when the band was called upon as session/backing players to the hit group Bucks Fizz. Lauri took part in many UK and European tours with them and was injured in the Bucks Fizz coach crash.

Lauri joined the newly formed Cliff Richard Band in 1987. He toured with Richard for three years, including visits to New Zealand, Australia and Europe, and recorded with the band on the album Thief in the Night. Lauri took part in the concert called The Event at the now demolished Wembley Stadium.

In the early 1990s, Lauri toured with Elaine Paige, again as guitarist/vocalist. He later worked with the glam rock Glitter Band, both touring and in the recording studio.

From 1996 to 1999, Lauri worked in various theatres, playing guitar for comedian Billy Pearce, singer David Essex, and as part of comedy duo Hale and Pace's backing band. Also in the 1990s, he played at many recording sessions at Pelican Studios, which was part-owned by Ray Stiles, bass guitarist with The Hollies.

Lauri joined The Hollies in 2004 as a guitarist and backing vocalist, and is a contributor to the harmonies for which The Hollies are known. He recorded with The Hollies on their studio albums, Staying Power and Then, Now and Always, as well as their double CD titled, Hollies Live Hits, We Got the Tunes.

Lauri has been part of the Hollies tour since 2004. On tour, he is the featured singer on several of their hits, including "King Midas in Reverse" and "Here I Go Again". He performed with the band during their 50th anniversary tour in 2012, as well as on the following album, Fifty at 50.

Lauri performs as a solo artist when not on tour with the band. He has written and recorded many original songs, and released his first solo CD in 2012, titled At Last. He toured the US in support of this CD and subsequently recorded a second album, Curfew.
