= Jimmy Jewell (saxophonist) =

English saxophonist

- Born: 1945 (age 79–80); United Kingdom
- Genres: Jazz; Soul
- Occupation: Musician
- Instrument: Saxophone
- Years active: 1962–present
- Website: jimmyjewell.com

Jimmy Jewell (born 1945) is a British session saxophonist, with notable contributions to much of Gallagher & Lyle's work, along with performances on hits including Joan Armatrading's UK top 10 hit "Love and Affection".

== Early career ==
Jimmy Jewell began his career in 1962, participating in several jazz and rhythm and blues bands including Eddie Marten and the Sabres. He went professional in 1963 with the band Kris Ryan and the Questions after the band's drummer Geoff Wills recommended his inclusion. With Jewell's participation, Questions shifted genre from rock to something more soul-oriented. Owing to artistic differences with Ryan, Jewell left the band after final gigs in Germany during 1965.

In 1966, Jewell moved to London, played for a while in the Freddie Mack Sound and subsequently toured Germany with Chris Andrews and the Paramounts. He joined the Magics, a Berlin band, and toured in Germany. In 1967, back in London, he played gigs with Lord "Caesar" Sutch & the Roman Empire, and the joined soul band Stewart James Inspiration, with whom he toured until their dissolution 1968.

After joining the Keef Hartley Band, Jewell played Woodstock and a couple of albums were released with his saxophone sound: The Battle of North West Six (1969) and The Time Is Near (August 1970).

== 1970s ==
Jewell was a prolific session musician and band member during the 1970s.

He recorded with the Hollies on their Distant Light album in 1971.

Recording during 1973 and 1974, Jewell appeared on Ronnie Lane's Anymore for Anymore. He recorded with the Hollies on their self-titled album. In 1975, Jewell recorded for Maggie Bell's album Suicide Sal and for Andy Fairweather Low's album La Booga Rooga. Jewell toured with Gallagher and Lyle during the mid 1970s, and appeared on their February 1976 album Breakaway and their 1977 album Love on the Airwaves.

Jewell recorded with Fairport Convention, and appears on their May 1976 release Gottle O'Geer. And also in 1976 he gave a notable performance on the album Joan Armatrading on the popular track "Love and Affection", which as a single reached a top-10 position in the UK Singles Chart.

In 1977, Jewell recorded with Chris de Burgh on At the End of a Perfect Day, playing both saxophone and brass. He performed on the Roger Daltrey album One of the Boys, with John Lodge on the album Natural Avenue, and with the Hollies for their album A Crazy Steal, released in 1978. He recorded with Rogue on their 1979 album Would You Let Your Daughter.

Jewell went on to release two albums: I'm Amazed (1977) and From the First Time I Met You (1978).

== 1980s and beyond ==
Work was occasional including small jazz bands and collaboration with Lonnie Brooks on the 1981 album Turn On The Night. Jewell's performances appear on several retrospectives and compilations including Woodstock – Back to the Garden: 50th Anniversary Experience.
