= A Crazy Steal =

Studio album by the Hollies
- Released: March 1, 1978
- Recorded: 1 March – 26 August 1977; 8–9 January 1976 for "Boulder To Birmingham"
- Studio: Bashing Street, London
- Genre: Rock, pop
- Length: 41:56
- Label: Polydor(UK); Epic (US)
- Producer: The Hollies, Alan Parsons

The Hollies chronology
Hollies Live Hits (1976)	A Crazy Steal (1978)	Five Three One - Double Seven O Four (1979)

A Crazy Steal is a studio album by the English rock and pop group the Hollies. It includes their version of Emmylou Harris' "Boulder to Birmingham", which had been released two years prior, reaching number 10 in the charts in New Zealand. Three other songs from this album ("Hello To Romance", "Amnesty", and "Writing On The Wall") were released in 1977, and 1978 as singles, yet failed to chart anywhere.

== Overview and recording ==
The album was released after a very successful LP Hollies Live Hits. A working title of the LP was Amnesty, but it was eventually changed to A Crazy Steal (a lyric within the song Hello to Romance). The cover photo was made in the Stadthalle in Bremerhaven and it was the drummer's idea. The cover art was made by Gered “Jo” Mankowitz, co-founder of creative design group Mainartery. The album was recorded between tours to Germany in the summer of 1977. Session musicians in the studio included keyboardists Hans-Peter Arnesen (from the Rubettes) and Pete Wingfield, the saxophones were played by jazzman Tony Coe and session saxophonist Jimmy Jewell. In the song Caracas, Sol Amarfio of the band Osibisa plays the conga (the band wrote the song under the influence of their upcoming tour to Venezuela). Non-album track from these sessions named Crossfire was used as a B-side of Amnesty single.

Bass player Bernie Calvert recalls: “That was a difficult period for the band. Allan (Clarke) was going through another unsettled period within himself. We had a great deal of problems. We were touring in Germany and the album was finished and the record company was pushing to get the product on the market, so therefore the cover was rushed... Consequently the whole thing was very much a rushed package.”

Singer Allan Clarke left the band shortly after the release, but came back a few months later. Although he had reservations about the politics within the band, in conversation with Mike Ragogna he considered the album to be the band's best of the era. "I thought the album A Crazy Steal was beautiful. We thought that we had a chance of getting hits with the newer songs we were making because they were different and more in the American way, but it wasn't meant to be. The songs are still there though, and they still sound great."

== Reception ==
The album received mixed reviews. Billboard highlighted the song "Boulder to Birmingham" (produced by Alan Parsons) and stated that "the lads are still very much in tune with contemporary harmony". The Corpus Christi Times determined that the "harmonies are as rich and lush as ever, as are the compositions written by the Clarke/Hicks/Sylvester team". In contrast, Record Mirror wrote that the album is "an awfully long drag to listen to".

== Track listing ==
All songs written by Allan Clarke, Tony Hicks and Terry Sylvester except where noted.

Side one

1. "Writing on the Wall"
2. "What Am I Gonna Do"
3. "Let It Pour"
4. "Burn Out"
5. "Hello to Romance"

Side two

1. "Amnesty" (D. Doumas)
2. "Caracas"
3. "Boulder to Birmingham" (Bill Danoff, Emmylou Harris)
4. "Clown Service"
5. "Feet on the Ground"

== Personnel ==
The Hollies

- Allan Clarke – lead vocals
- Tony Hicks – lead guitar
- Terry Sylvester – rhythm guitar
- Bernie Calvert – bass
- Bobby Elliott – drums

with:

- Pete Wingfield – piano, Roland synthesizer, organ
- Hans Peter Arnesen – piano, clavinet
- Jimmy Jewell – alto and soprano saxophone
- Tony Coe – soprano saxophone on "Hello To Romance"
- Sol Amarfio – congas on "Writing on the Wall" and "Caracas"
- Rhett Davies – engineer, remixing
