= Another Night (Hollies album) =

Studio album by The Hollies
- Released: February 1975
- Recorded: 19 March – 4 October 1974
- Studio: EMI Studios, London
- Genre: Rock, pop
- Length: 40:21
- Label: Polydor (UK); Epic (US)
- Producer: Ron Richards

The Hollies chronology
Hollies (1974)	Another Night (1975)	Write On (1976)

Singles from Another Night
- 1. "I'm Down" Released: November 1974; 2. "Sandy (4th of July, Asbury Park)" Released: May 1975; 3. "Another Night" Released: May 1975 (USA and Canada release only)

Another Night is the 15th UK studio album by English rock/pop band, the Hollies. It is the band's second album with returning vocalist Allan Clarke who rejoined in 1974 for the album Hollies, after leaving for a solo career in 1972. The album is made up of original material, with the exception of "4th of July, Asbury Park (Sandy)" by the (at the time) relatively unknown Bruce Springsteen.

== Overview and recording ==
The first song the band members composed for the LP was title track "Another Night", inspired by the style of Steely Dan, but the first songs recorded were "Give Me Time" in March 1974 and the ballad "Lonely Hobo Lullaby" in April of the same year. The LP was produced by Ron Richards. Session musicians on the album included Tony Hymas on piano and recording engineer Alan Parsons on Moog synthesizer (borrowed from Paul McCartney). During bassist Bernie Calvert's illness, guitarist Tony Hicks recorded some of the bass parts ("Lucy", "Look Out Johnny (There's a Monkey On Your Back)").

== Release ==
The gatefold artwork was created by Joe Petagno (who made artwork for Led Zeppelin, Roy Harper and Nazareth). It was reminiscent of one of the previous albums Out on the Road. The release of the album was preceded by the single "I'm Down" (the song inspired by the producer Richards' life story). The powerful ballad, chosen as "45 of the month" by the BBC's John Peel, surprisingly flopped in the UK but became a hit in Australia and the Netherlands. In New Zealand it reached No. 4. In the United States, three songs from the album became minor hits on the Billboard charts. ("I'm Down", "4th of July, Asbury Park (Sandy)" and "Another Night").

== Reception ==
The album received some positive reviews in music magazines as Phonograph Records (who called the album one of their strongest to date) and Record Mirror ("It displays not only their performing skills but their writing ones also."). Yet the album was not a success in the UK, although it did enter the charts in the US, Australia and New Zealand. The Hollies toured Australia and the US in support of the album. American R&B and soul singer Percy Sledge covered the song "Lonely Hobo Lullaby" on his album Shining Through The Rain in 2004.

"That is my favourite Hollies album," Terry Sylvester said later. "If Sandy has been a hit record, The Hollies would have been as big as the Bee Gees were in the same period. We were disappointed: we thought we’d done really well with Another Night." In fact, "Sandy" flopped in the UK but became a Top 10 hit in the Netherlands (No. 8) and New Zealand (No. 12). It also did well in Germany (No. 22).

Professional ratings
Review scores
Source	Rating
Allmusic	link

== Track listing ==
All songs composed by Allan Clarke, Tony Hicks and Terry Sylvester except where noted.

=== Side 1 ===
1. "Another Night" – 3:57
2. "4th of July, Asbury Park (Sandy)"* (Bruce Springsteen) – 4:11
3. "Lonely Hobo Lullaby" (Sylvester, Clarke) – 4:18
4. "Second Hand Hang-Ups"* – 4:32
5. "Time Machine Jive" – 3:19

=== Side 2 ===
1. "I'm Down" – 4:14
2. "Look Out Johnny (There's a Monkey On Your Back)" – 3:35
3. "Give Me Time"* (Sylvester, Clarke) – 3:11
4. "You Gave Me Life (With That Look in Your Eyes)" (Sylvester, Clarke) – 3:52
5. "Lucy"* – 5:12

=== CD Bonus tracks ===
1. "Son of a Rotten Gambler" (Chip Taylor) – 4:09
2. "Layin' to the Music" (Sylvester, Clarke) – 2:32
3. "Come Down to the Shore" (Colin Horton Jennings) – 3:51
4. "Hello Lady Goodbye" – 3:56 (B-Side to "I'm Down")
5. "Another Night" (Live) – 3:40
6. "4th of July, Asbury Park (Sandy)" (Live) (Bruce Springsteen) – 4:11
7. "I'm Down" (Live) – 4:04

== Personnel ==
The Hollies

- Allan Clarke – lead vocals
- Tony Hicks – lead guitar, bass
- Terry Sylvester – rhythm guitar
- Bernie Calvert – bass
- Bobby Elliott – drums

with:

- Alan Parsons – synthesizer
- Tony Hymas – piano, string arrangements ("I'm Down")
- Chris Gunning – string arrangements*
