= I'm Alive (EP) =

EP by The Hollies
- Released: September 1965
- Genre: Rock
- Length: 9:23
- Language: English
- Label: Parlophone
- Producer: Ron Richards

The Hollies chronology
Hollies (1965)	I'm Alive (1965)	Would You Believe? (1966)

I'm Alive is the sixth British EP released by The Hollies. It was put out by Parlophone in mono with the catalogue number GEP 8942 and released in the UK in late September 1965. The EP entered the British charts on 25 September 1965 and spent 15 weeks there, peaking at #5 on the Record Retailer chart, their highest charting EP.

The EP's A-side consisted of both sides of the band's successful single "I'm Alive", released in May 1965. The B-side contained the album track "Mickey's Monkey" from Hollies and "Honey and Wine", exclusive to this EP.

"Honey and Wine" was recollected on the See for Miles Records compilation Not the Hits Again! in 1986. "You Know He Did" was recollected on the See for Miles Records compilation The EP Collection in 1987.

== Track listing ==
Side one
No.	Title	Writer(s)	Lead vocals	Length
1.	"I'm Alive"	Clint Ballard, Jr.	Clarke	2:23
2.	"You Know He Did"	Allan Clarke, Tony Hicks, Graham Nash	Clarke	2:01

Side two
No.	Title	Writer(s)	Lead vocals	Length
3.	"Honey and Wine"	Gerry Goffin, Carole King	Clarke	2:29
4.	"Mickey's Monkey"	Holland–Dozier–Holland	Clarke	2:30
