= Terry Sylvester =

English musician (born 1947)

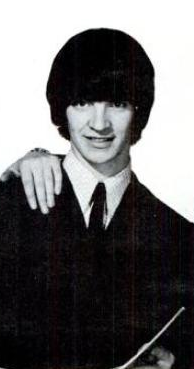
- Sylvester with The Escorts in 1965

Background information
- Born: Terence Sylvester; 8 January 1947 (age 79); Allerton, Liverpool, England
- Genres: Soft rock, pop
- Instruments: Guitar, vocals
- Years active: 1960s–present
- Website: www.terrysylvester.com

Terence Sylvester (born 8 January 1947) is an English musician and songwriter. He is a former member of the Escorts, the Swinging Blue Jeans (1966–1969), and the Hollies. In the latter role, he took on the high parts formerly sung by Graham Nash, who had left the band in December 1968.

== Life and career ==
=== Early career/The Escorts ===
Sylvester grew up in Allerton, Liverpool, and attended school with future Badfinger guitarist, Joey Molland. At the age of 14, Sylvester was employed for a time as a panel beater by George Harrison's brother. The group he co-founded, the Escorts, appeared with the Beatles in the early 1960s. The Escorts recorded their cover of "Dizzy Miss Lizzy" on Fontana Records in 1964. A compilation album of the Escorts, From the Blue Angel, was issued on LP and then, in 1995, on CD.

=== The Swinging Blue Jeans ===
In 1966, Sylvester began a three-year stint with the Swinging Blue Jeans, replacing guitarist/vocalist Ralph Ellis.

=== The Hollies ===
Sylvester's debut with the Hollies in January 1969 saw him sing on the UK chart hit singles "Sorry Suzanne" and "He Ain't Heavy, He's My Brother", plus on the albums Hollies Sing Dylan and Hollies Sing Hollies (both 1969), which debuted Sylvester's songwriting. His first song for the group was "Gloria Swansong", and he continued to write by himself ("Pull Down the Blind", "Cable Car" 1971), with Allan Clarke ("Why Didn't You Believe", "Man Without a Heart", "Perfect Lady Housewife") and as part of Clarke-Hicks-Sylvester.

This trio composed most of the Hollies songs on several albums: Confessions of the Mind (1970), Hollies (1974), Another Night (1975), Write On and Russian Roulette (both 1976 – although neither of the latter two were issued in the US in their original form) plus A Crazy Steal (1978).

Some of Sylvester's work appeared on B-sides on singles including "Indian Girl" (1972), "No More Riders" (1974), in addition to singing lead vocals on the Tony Hicks and Kenny Lynch co-written song, "Oh Granny" (1972).

In addition to high harmony vocals, Sylvester also sang a brief lead vocal section on the 1970 UK hit, "Gasoline Alley Bred" (sung mostly by Allan Clarke). He then took on a greater share of responsibilities during the 1972–73 period, when Swedish vocalist, Mikael Rickfors, temporarily replaced Clarke. Sylvester sang "Long Cool Woman in a Black Dress" on the Hollies' 1973 US tour and on American television appearances. He later sang a number of lead vocals during this period on Romany (1972). This album included a cover of Judee Sill's "Jesus Was a Crossmaker". On Out on the Road (1973), Sylvester took lead vocals on several songs including "Slow Down, Go Down", "Pick Up the Pieces", and "Mr. Heartbreaker" (which was co-written with Dean Ford of Marmalade).

After a period of discontent, partly over musical policy, Sylvester split with the Hollies in May 1981, in an incident that precipitated the resignation of bassist Bernie Calvert.

=== Solo work ===
In 1974, Sylvester released his eponymous solo album, re-releasing it as I Believe with a slightly revised track listing in 1976. Jimmy Griffin guested harmony vocals on the song "Travelin' Boy", while Sylvester cut solo versions of his Hollies songs "Cable Car", "Indian Girl", "Pick Up the Pieces Again" and later, a solo version of his 1973 Hollies song "I Had a Dream", which was added to the CD version of the album. The 1974 single on Polydor ("For the Peace of All Mankind", an Albert Hammond cover) and a couple of singles in 1976 ("I Believe", a Stevie Wonder cover, and "End of the Line") all taken from his solo album failed to chart. In 1978, Sylvester issued the non-album singles "Too Bad Lucy Jane" and "Silver and Gold" in the UK, but these also failed to chart. He also earlier had contributed vocals to the Alan Parsons Project's first album, Tales of Mystery and Imagination (1975), singing lead on "To One in Paradise", and providing background vocals on "The Cask of Amontillado", behind John Miles.

In 1994, a further solo album appeared, I Believe in Love, comprising live versions of both his Hollies and solo recorded songs, plus covers such as "It Never Rains in Southern California", from a concert recorded on 20 March 1994 in Germany.

=== Griffin & Sylvester ===
In 1982, Sylvester, in collaboration with Jimmy Griffin in Memphis, Tennessee, recorded and released Griffin & Sylvester on Polydor. From this album, "Please Come into My Life", was released as a single. In the mid-1990s, Sylvester teamed up with Griffin again as the duo 'Griffin & Sylvester', touring the UK and Canada as a part of the 'Soft Rock Cafe'. The friendship and partnership continued, on and off, up to Griffin's death in January 2005. Their 1982 album was re-issued on compact disc with three bonus songs in 1999.

=== Later releases, Rock and Roll Hall of Fame ===
A double album of Sylvester's recordings with the Hollies (mostly Sylvester lead vocal tracks), the Alan Parsons Project, solo, and Griffin & Sylvester entitled The Complete Works: 1969–1982, was issued in France on Magic Records in 2001.

In 2010, as a member of the Hollies, Sylvester was inducted into the Rock and Roll Hall of Fame along with Graham Nash, Allan Clarke, Tony Hicks, Bobby Elliott, Bernie Calvert and Eric Haydock.

== Discography ==
=== With the Swinging Blue Jeans ===
==== Albums ====
Title	Year
Don't Make Me Over	1966

==== Singles ====
Single	Year
"Don't Make Me Over" b/w "What Can I Do Today"	1966
"Sandy" b/w "I'm Gonna Have You"	1966
"Rumours, Gossip, Words Untrue" b/w "Now the Summer's Gone"	1966
"Tremblin'" b/w "Something's Coming Along"	1967
"Don't Go Out into the Rain (You're Gonna Melt)" b/w "One Woman Man"	1967
"What Have They Done to Hazel" (as Ray Ennis and the Blue Jeans) b/w "Now That You've Got Me (You Don't Seem to Want Me)"	1968
"Hey Mrs. Housewife" (as the Bluejeans) b/w "Sandfly"	1969

=== With the Hollies ===
==== Albums ====
Title	Album details
Hollies Sing Dylan	Released: May 1969; Origin: UK; Label: Parlophone (PMC/PCS 7078); Format: mono/stereo LP; US/Canadian Release: Words and Music by Bob Dylan
Hollies Sing Hollies	Released: November 1969; Origin: UK; Label: Parlophone (PCS 7092); Format: stereo LP; US/Canadian Release: He Ain't Heavy, He's My Brother
Confessions of the Mind	Released: November 1970; Origin: UK; Label: Parlophone (PCS 7116); Format: stereo LP; US/Canadian Release: Moving Finger
Distant Light	Released: 8 October 1971; Origin: UK; Label: Parlophone (PAS 10005); Format: stereo LP
Romany	Released: 1 November 1972; Origin: UK; Label: Polydor (2383 144); Format: stereo LP
Out on the Road	Released: June 1973; Origin: Germany; Label: Hansa (87119IT); Format: stereo LP
Hollies	Released: March 1974; Origin: UK; Label: Polydor (2383 262); Format: stereo LP
Another Night	Released: February 1975; Origin: UK; Label: Polydor (2442 128); Format: stereo LP
Write On	Released: January 1976; Origin: UK; Label: Polydor (2442 141); Format: stereo LP; US Release: Clarke, Hicks, Sylvester, Calvert & Elliot
Russian Roulette	Released: December 1976; Origin: UK; Label: Polydor (2383 421); Format: stereo LP
Hollies Live Hits	Released: March 1977; Origin: UK; Label: Polydor (2383 428); Format: stereo LP
A Crazy Steal	Released: 1 March 1978; Origin: UK; Label: Polydor (2383 474); Format: stereo LP
Five Three One - Double Seven O Four	Released: March 1979; Origin: UK; Label: Polydor (2442 160); Format: stereo LP
Buddy Holly	Released: October 1980; Origin: UK; Label: Polydor; Format: stereo LP

==== Singles ====
Title	Year
"Sorry Suzanne"	1969
"Blowin' in the Wind" (Note: "Blowin' in the Wind" was only released as a single in the Netherlands and New Zealand.)	1969
"I'll Be Your Baby Tonight" (Note: "I'll Be Your Baby Tonight" was only released as a single in Germany.)	1969
"He Ain't Heavy, He's My Brother"	1969
"Goodbye Tomorrow" (Note: "Goodbye Tomorrow" was only released as a single in the Netherlands.)	1970
"Why Didn't You Believe?" (Note: "Why Didn't You Believe?" was only released as a single in New Zealand.)	1970
"I Can't Tell the Bottom from the Top"	1970
"Gasoline Alley Bred"	1970
"Frightened Lady" (Note: "Frightened Lady" was only released as a single in Germany.)	1971
"Survival of the Fittest" (Note: "Survival of the Fittest" was only released as a single in North America.)	1971
"Too Young to Be Married" (Note: "Too Young to Be Married" was only released as a single in Australasia and the Netherlands.)	1971
"Hey Willy"	1971
"The Baby"	1972
"Long Cool Woman in a Black Dress"	1972
"Man Without a Heart" (Note: "Man Without a Heart" was only released as a single in the Netherlands.)	1972
"Long Dark Road" (Note: "Long Dark Road" was only released as a single in North America, Continental Europe and South Africa.)	1972
"Magic Woman Touch"	1972
"Don't Leave the Child Alone" (Note: "Don't Leave the Child Alone" was only released as a single in Germany and Spain.)	1973
"Jesus Was a Crossmaker"	1973
"Slow Down Go Down" (Note: "Slow Down Go Down" was only released as a single in Australasia.)	1973
"Slow Down" (Note: "Slow Down" was only released as a single in North America. It is a different song to "Slow Down Go Down".)	1973
"The Day that Curly Billy Shot Down Crazy Sam McGee"	1973
"The Air That I Breathe"	1974
"Son of a Rotten Gambler"	1974
"Don't Let Me Down" (Note: "Don't Let Me Down" was only released as a single in North America.)	1974
"I'm Down"	1974
"Out on the Road" (Note: "Out on the Road" was only released as a single in Germany.)	1974
"4th of July, Asbury Park (Sandy)"	1975
"Falling Calling" (Note: "Falling Calling" was only released as a single in the Netherlands and Belgium.)	1975
"Lonely Hobo Lullaby" (Note: "Lonely Hobo Lullaby" was only released as a single in New Zealand.)	1975
"Another Night" (Note: "Another Night" was only released as a single in North America and South America.)	1975
"Write On" (Note: "Write On" was only released as a single in North America, Continental Europe and South Africa.)	1975
"Boulder to Birmingham"	1976
"Star"	1976
"Daddy Don't Mind"	1976
"Wiggle That Wotsit"	1976
"Russian Roulette" (Note: "Russian Roulette" was only released as a single in New Zealand.)	1977
"Hello to Romance"	1977
"Draggin' My Heels" (Note: "Draggin' My Heels" was only released as a single in North America.)	1977
"Amnesty"	1977
"Burn Out" (Note: "Burn Out" was only released as a single in Germany.)	1977
"Writing on the Wall" (Note: "Writing on the Wall" was only released as a single in North America and New Zealand.)	1978
"Something to Live For"	1979
"Harlequin" (Note: "Harlequin" was only released as a single in Germany.)	1979
"Soldier's Song"	1980
"Heartbeat"	1980
"Holliedaze"	1981

=== With Jimmy Griffin (as Griffin & Sylvester) ===
==== Albums ====
- 1982: Griffin & Sylvester

==== Singles ====
- 1982: "Please Come into My Life"
- 1982: "Rozanne"

=== Solo ===
==== Albums ====
- 1974: Terry Sylvester
- 1976: I Believe
- 1994: I Believe in Love

==== Singles ====
- 1974: "For the Peace of All Mankind"
- 1974: "Mary Anne"
- 1975: "End of the Line" - AUS #82
- 1976: "I Believe (When I Fall in Love It Will Be Forever)"
- 1978: "Silver and Gold"
- 1978: "Too Bad Lucy Jane"
