= Hollies Sing Dylan =

Studio album by The Hollies
- Released: May 1969
- Recorded: 4–6 November 1968
- Studios: Abbey Road Studios, London
- Genres: Rock, Pop, Gospel
- Length: 36:07
- Label: UK: Parlophone
- Producer: Ron Richards

The Hollies chronology
Hollies' Greatest (1968)	Hollies Sing Dylan (1969)	Hollies Sing Hollies (1969)

The Hollies US chronology
Dear Eloise / King Midas in Reverse (1967)	Words and Music by Bob Dylan (1969)	He Ain't Heavy, He's My Brother (1969)

Professional ratings
Review scores
Source	Rating
AllMusic	3.5/5 stars
Rolling Stone	(favourable)
Sounds	3/5 stars
The Village Voice	B−

Hollies Sing Dylan is a 1969 cover album featuring songs written by Bob Dylan and performed by the Hollies. It is their eighth UK album. It was also released in the US as Words and Music by Bob Dylan with a different cover but using the same band image and track order. First released on compact disc in West Germany in the late 1980s, it was not released in that format in the rest of Europe until 1993. For this issue, two bonus tracks, the single version of "Blowin' in the Wind" and a live version of "The Times They Are a-Changin'". A later remastered issue in 1999 added a third bonus track, a live version of "Blowin' in the Wind".

== Background ==
The album was recorded and released following Graham Nash's departure from the band to join David Crosby and Stephen Stills in December 1968 after early sessions for a follow-up to the psychedelic concept album, Butterfly, broke down. Nash became frustrated when the other band members showed opposition to lyrics in his latest songs. By that time, Nash was the only member of the band using LSD and marijuana and a rift was forming between him and his beer drinking bandmates:

I'd written what I thought were some interesting songs at that time — 'Marrakesh Express', 'Right Between the Eyes', 'Lady of the Island' — and the Hollies weren't interested in them. And when I said in the first 'Sleep Song' for instance, 'I'll take off my clothes and I'll lay by your side', they said, 'Hey, you can't bloody sing that. We're not going to sing that filthy stuff.' Saying those things to a stoned musician is ridiculous.

Nash quickly became disillusioned with the direction that the band was moving artistically and especially derided their decision to record an entire album of covers:

This happened at the same time they wanted to make an album with Dylan tunes. I thought even that was a sacrilege, because we were doing them like [Graham starts singing "Blowing in the Wind" in swing fashion, snapping his fingers]: 'How many roads, yeah, would a . . .' — a Las Vegas type thing, and it was driving me nuts. I couldn't handle it.

Nash has claimed in interviews that he sang on the version of "Blowing in the Wind", and indeed, a TV appearance of the band playing the song with Nash from late 1968 exists (one of the last TV shows he did with the band). However, his name does not appear on the album credits.

There have been claims that the album was hated by fans and critics alike. However it peaked at No. 3 in the UK, their third highest showing for any LP and second-highest charting for one with newly recorded material. Nevertheless, the group's next album was titled Hollies Sing Hollies in an apparent move to placate critics. In an interview for Billboard magazine in 1974, Clarke reflected on the album:

At the time I was pleased with the album but on reflection, I don't think it was a good move for the Hollies. People knocked it, saying, 'How could they ever relate to Dylan?' We thought we'd do it for Hollies fans, but I was really just reading Dylan's words, not singing them. I could have been a lot better.

This is the first album with new member Terry Sylvester, who replaced Nash.

== Track listing ==
All songs written and composed by Bob Dylan, except "This Wheel's on Fire" composed by Dylan and Rick Danko.

=== Side one ===
1. "When the Ship Comes In" – 2:40
2. "I'll Be Your Baby Tonight" – 3:24
3. "I Want You" – 2:09
4. "This Wheel's on Fire" – 2:52
5. "I Shall Be Released" – 3:20
6. "Blowin' in the Wind" – 4:06

=== Side two ===
1. "Quit Your Low Down Ways" – 2:40
2. "Just Like a Woman" – 3:57
3. "The Times They Are a-Changin'" – 3:15
4. "All I Really Want to Do" – 2:19
5. "My Back Pages" – 2:55
6. "Mighty Quinn" – 2:24

== Personnel ==
As listed in liner notes.

The Hollies

- Bernard Calvert – bass guitar, piano, organ, keyboards
- Allan Clarke – vocals, harmonica
- Bobby Elliott – drums, percussion
- Tony Hicks – vocals, lead guitar, banjo
- Terry Sylvester – vocals, rhythm guitar
- Graham Nash – vocals, acoustic guitar on “Blowin’ In The Wind” (uncredited)

String arrangements and composing on "Blowin' in the Wind" by Mike Vickers. All other strings arranged and conducted by Lew Warburton.

== See also ==
- List of songs written by Bob Dylan
- List of artists who have covered Bob Dylan songs
