= Hollies (1974 album) =

Studio album by The Hollies
- Released: March 1974
- Recorded: 7 August–17 December 1973
- Studios: EMI Studios, London
- Genres: Rock, pop
- Length: 41:42
- Labels: Polydor (UK); Epic (US)
- Producers: The Hollies, Ron Richards

The Hollies chronology
| Out on the Road (1973) | Hollies (1974) | Another Night (1975) |

Professional ratings
Review scores
| Source | Rating |
|---|---|
| Allmusic | 2/5 stars |
| Christgau's Record Guide | B− |

Hollies is the 14th UK studio album by the English pop rock group the Hollies, released in 1974, marking the return of Allan Clarke after he had left for a solo career. It features the band's cover of Albert Hammond's ballad "The Air That I Breathe," a major worldwide hit that year. The album has the same title as the band's third album from 1965.

== Overview and recording ==
The Hollies used some songs recorded for their previous LP Out on the Road as the basis for the album. Out On The Road was released only in Germany and Spain, after which it was cancelled and some songs were re-recorded with Allan Clarke. They also added a comeback single written by Clarke, a worldwide hit "The Day that Curly Billy Shot Down Crazy Sam McGee" (Top 30 hit in the UK and No. 1 hit in the Netherlands). Clarke himself wrote several new songs for the record, including the country-pop hybrid "Rubber Lucy" and the ballad "Don't Let Me Down" (not to be confused with the Beatles song). "Love Makes the World Go Round" and "Falling Calling", both written by Clarke and Terry Sylvester, were older tunes from the abandoned stage musical Oh Flux!. Song "Tip of the Iceberg", written by Kenny Lynch and Tony Hicks was omitted from the album and was not released until The Hollies at Abbey Road (1973 to 1989) CD compilation in 1998, another unreleased tune from the album sessions, "Burn Fire Burn" by Bobby Elliott, was released as an album bonus track in 2008.

Ron Richards served as producer, while the recording engineer was Alan Parsons. British art group Hipgnosis designed the album cover. Session musicians on the album included Duffy Power (harmonica on "Down on the Road") and Jim Jewell (tenor saxophone on "It's A Shame, It's A Game" and "Transatlantic Westbound Jet").

When the Hollies were working on the opening track "Falling Calling", Paul McCartney visited them at the Abbey Road studios and subsequently asked the band's drummer Bobby Elliott if he wanted to join his band Wings. Elliott declined, however, and continued with the Hollies. The most famous track from the album is the love song "The Air That I Breathe" (previously recorded by the composer, Albert Hammond and also by Phil Everly on his 1973 solo album, Star Spangled Springer). The orchestral arrangement of the song (and several others on the album) was the work of composer Christopher Gunning. The single became Top 10 hit in many countries, such as the UK, USA, Canada, Australia, Germany and the Netherlands. The non-album track from these sessions named "No More Riders", written by Terry Sylvester and Cat Stevens' elder brother David Gordon, was issued as the B-side of the single.

Hollies got some positive reviews (for example in NME) and put the band back on the charts for the first time in four years. With the help of the worldwide success of the single "The Air That I Breathe", the album charted in the UK, Canada, the United States and Australia.

Record World said of "Don't Let Me Down" that "[the Hollies'] patented harmonies build into a colossal culmination by song's upper end."

== Track listing ==
Side one
| No. | Title | Writer(s) | Length |
|---|---|---|---|
| 1. | "Falling Calling" | Allan Clarke, Terry Sylvester | 3:11 |
| 2. | "It's a Shame, it's a Game" | C. Horton Jennings, Tony Hicks | 3:41 |
| 3. | "Don't Let Me Down" | Allan Clarke | 4:20 |
| 4. | "Out on the Road" | Kenny Lynch, Tony Hicks | 2:54 |
| 5. | "The Air That I Breathe" | Albert Hammond, Mike Hazlewood | 4:11 |

Side two
| No. | Title | Writer(s) | Length |
|---|---|---|---|
| 6. | "Rubber Lucy" | Allan Clarke | 4:06 |
| 7. | "Transatlantic Westbound Jet" | Bobby Elliott, Terry Sylvester | 3:12 |
| 8. | "Pick up the Pieces Again" | Terry Sylvester | 3:58 |
| 9. | "Down on the Run" | C. Horton Jennings, Tony Hicks | 3:49 |
| 10. | "Love Makes the World Go Around" | Allan Clarke, Terry Sylvester | 3:43 |
| 11. | "The Day That Curly Billy Shot Down Crazy Sam McGee" | Allan Clarke | 4:25 |

== Personnel ==
=== The Hollies ===
- Allan Clarke – lead vocals
- Tony Hicks – lead guitar, backing vocals
- Terry Sylvester – rhythm guitar, backing vocals
- Bobby Elliott – drums and percussion
- Bernie Calvert – bass guitar, keyboards

=== Additional personnel ===
- Duffy Power – harmonica on "Down On The Run"
- Jim Jewell – tenor saxophone on "It's A Shame, It's A Game", soprano saxophone on "Transatlantic Westbound Jet"
- Chris Gunning – orchestral arrangements on "Don't Let Me Down", "Love Makes The World Go Round" and "The Air That I Breathe"
