= Listen to Me (Hollies song) =

Single by the Hollies
- B-side: "Do the Best You Can"
- Released: 27 September 1968
- Recorded: 28 August 1968
- Studio: EMI, London
- Genre: Pop
- Length: 2:37
- Label: Parlophone
- Songwriter: Tony Hazzard
- Producer: Ron Richards

The Hollies singles chronology
"Jennifer Eccles" (1968)	"Listen to Me" (1968)	"Sorry Suzanne" (1969)

"Listen to Me" is a song by Tony Hazzard. It was released as a single in 1968 by the Hollies; this, the last Hollies single during Graham Nash's original tenure in the group, reached number 11 on the UK Singles Chart in October 1968 and received praise from critics.

== Background and recording ==
"Listen to Me" has been characterised as gentler than previous Hollies releases; the Evening Standard described the song as "a change of style a la Rubber Soul Beatles". Tony Hazzard wrote the song after conceiving the lyric "your ears are deaf, your mouth is dumb, your eyes are blind". The songwriter was present at its recording session at EMI Studios; there, he pitched a further composition to the Hollies which Graham Nash liked, but the rest of the band chose not to record after Nash's departure. Consequently, "Listen to Me" was Hazzard's only composition to be recorded by the Hollies.

The recording session for "Listen to Me" was Nash's last with the Hollies until he rejoined the band in 1982; he later commented that "in my head, I had already left the Hollies". The band promoted the single with an appearance on the 26 September edition of Top of the Pops. According to drummer Bobby Elliott, they were invited to appear on the programme again as the song climbed up the chart but had to decline as Nash was in the USA and could not return in time.

Tony Hazzard recorded a studio version of the song for his 1969 album Tony Hazzard Sings Tony Hazzard. Hazzard's 2022 album Demonstration features a remixed version of his original demo of the song with a newly recorded guitar part by the Hollies' Tony Hicks.

== Reception ==
"Listen to Me" received a warm critical reception. John Wells of NME considered the song "a much more mature and sophisticated sound" for the band, adding "this won't please their "Midas" fans as out goes that mind-shattering sound to be replaced by a gentle, more melodic treatment." Penny Valentine of Disc and Music Echo praised the Hollies' "instant commerciality", deeming the song "very competent, very good and a very big hit", while Peter Jones of Record Mirror described it as "fast-tempoed and unusually phrased and clearly a tremendous hit." Chris Welch of Melody Maker considered "Listen to Me" an example of "mysterious currents of influence [coursing] their way through the group scene" that shares "similar sounds and rhythms" to "The Weight", then recently released as a single by both the Band and Spooky Tooth, and "Sour Milk Sea", a contemporaneous single recorded by Jackie Lomax. He summarised the sound as "the sort of nostalgic rock affecting many old-established groups... ...a heavy beat tinged with melancholy, which will appeal greatly to melancholy rockers around the 26 age group." Billboard described the single as a "strong outing" and an "infectious rhythm entry."

== Charts ==
Chart (1969)	Peak position
West Germany (GfK)	13
New Zealand (Listener)	7
UK Singles (OCC)	11
