= Sorry Suzanne =

Single by the Hollies
- B-side: "Not That Way at All"
- Released: 28 February 1969
- Recorded: 27–28 January 1969
- Studio: EMI, London
- Genre: Pop rock
- Length: 2:59
- Label: Parlophone (UK); Epic (US)
- Songwriters: Geoff Stephens, Tony Macaulay
- Producer: Ron Richards

The Hollies singles chronology
"Listen to Me" (1968)	"Sorry Suzanne" (1969)	"He Ain't Heavy, He's My Brother" (1969)

"Sorry Suzanne" is a 1969 single by the Hollies, co-written by Geoff Stephens and Tony Macaulay. It was the group's first song to feature Terry Sylvester in the place of Graham Nash. "Sorry Suzanne" was released with the B-side "Not That Way at All" on the Parlophone label (catalogue number R5765). The song reached number 3 on the UK Singles Chart in March 1969, number one in Switzerland on 22 April 1969, and number 56 on the Billboard Hot 100 in the US on May 31, 1969.

== Chart history ==
=== Weekly charts ===
Chart (1969)	Peak position
Australia (Go-Set)	6
Austria (Ö3 Austria Top 40)	12
Belgium (Ultratop 50 Flanders)	3
Belgium (Ultratop 50 Wallonia)	11
Canada Top Singles (RPM)	41
Finland (Soumen Virallinen)	11
Ireland (IRMA)	4
Netherlands (Single Top 100)	4
New Zealand (Listener)	4
Norway (VG-lista)	4
South Africa (Springbok)	1
Switzerland (Schweizer Hitparade)	1
UK Singles (Official Charts)	3
US Billboard Hot 100	56
US Cash Box Top 100	58
West Germany (GfK)	7

=== Year-end charts ===
Chart (1969)	Rank
South Africa	13
Switzerland	5
UK	57
