= Boulder to Birmingham =

1975 song by Emmylou Harris and Bill Danoff

Single by Emmylou Harris

from the album Pieces of the Sky
- B-side: "Queen Of The Silver Dollar"
- Released: February 7, 1975
- Genre: Country
- Length: 3:33
- Label: Reprise
- Songwriters: Emmylou Harris; Bill Danoff

"Boulder to Birmingham" is a song written by Emmylou Harris and Bill Danoff that first appeared on Harris's 1975 album Pieces of the Sky.

== Critical reception ==
In 2024, Rolling Stone ranked the song at #153 on its 200 Greatest Country Songs of All Time ranking. In June 2026, CBS News included the song in its list of the 250 essential American songs of the past 250 years.

== Cover versions ==
- A version was recorded in 1975 by Scott Walker and the Walker Brothers on their No Regrets album.
- Bill Danoff recorded the song with his group, the Starland Vocal Band, on their 1976 self-titled debut album.
- Dolly Parton included a cover of the song on her 1976 All I Can Do album.
- Joan Baez cut a live version of the song and it originally appeared on her 1976 live album From Every Stage; the track later appeared in the compilation Joan Baez: The Complete A&M Recordings (released September 23, 2003).
- A version of the song was a hit in New Zealand for The Hollies, reaching number ten there, and later appeared on its 1978 album A Crazy Steal.
- The song also appeared in a 1984 episode of The Dukes of Hazzard titled "Play It Again, Luke" in which it was sung by actor Tom Wopat as Luke and guest star Roberta Leighton as country singer and a former flame of Luke's named Candy Dix.
- Jim Horn recorded a version of the song on his 2012 album Children of the Universe featuring Renee Armand on vocals.
- For its 2012 album Scars & Stories, American rock band The Fray recorded a version of the song, and Harris appears on the track as a featured artist.
- The debut release from Fleeing Ghost Records, To Emmylou (2015) features a cover by the band Tall Tales and the Silver Lining.
- Aoife O'Donovan included a live version of the song on her 2016 album Man in a Neon Coat (Live from Cambridge).
- The Wailin' Jennys covered the song on its 2017 album Fifteen.
- In 2019 the song appeared in the film Wild Rose sung by Jessie Buckley.
