= Look Through Any Window =

- Swedish picture sleeve

Single by the Hollies
- B-side: "So Lonely"
- Released: 27 August 1965
- Recorded: 30 June 1965
- Studio: EMI, London
- Genre: Jangle pop; pop rock; folk rock
- Length: 2:14
- Label: Parlophone (UK); Imperial (US)
- Songwriters: Graham Gouldman, Charles Silverman
- Producer: Ron Richards

The Hollies singles chronology
"I'm Alive" (1965)	"Look Through Any Window" (1965)	"If I Needed Someone" (1965)

"Look Through Any Window" is a song by the British beat group the Hollies. It was their follow-up single to their first UK chart-topper, "I'm Alive", and reached No. 4 in the UK Singles Chart at the beginning of October 1965.

"Look Through Any Window" was The Hollies' first American Billboard Top 40 hit, peaking at No. 32 on 22 January 1966 ("Just One Look" in 1964 had been the band's first American chart entry). It made No. 3 in Canada in the RPM Magazine chart, as well as in South Africa. It was written by Graham Gouldman and Charles Silverman. The Hollies also recorded a version in French (titled "Regardez par des fenêtres") that was not officially released at the time but was included on the 1988 compilation Rarities.

Cash Box described it as a "medium-paced laconic teen-slanted ditty with a contagious repeating rhythmic riff."

First released as a single in the UK, it was included in the US version of the band's 1965 album Hollies titled Hear! Here! by their US label, Imperial Records.

The B-side, "So Lonely", later included on Hollies and Hear! Here!, was also recorded by the Everly Brothers and released in July 1966 on their Two Yanks in England album.

== Cover versions ==
- The American group Gary Lewis & the Playboys recorded the song for their 1966 album Hits Again!.
- The Yugoslav rock band Elipse recorded a Serbo-Croatian version entitled "Pogledaj kroz prozor" in 1966.
- The Brazilian band Renato e Seus Blue Caps recorded a version entitled “Pra Você Não Sou Ninguém”, in 1966, for their album Um Embalo Com Renato e Seus Blue Caps, singing in Portuguese.
- In 1966, the Tony Dallara band I campioni released an Italian version of the song as "Tu non ridi più".
