= Bernie Calvert =

English musician (born 1942)

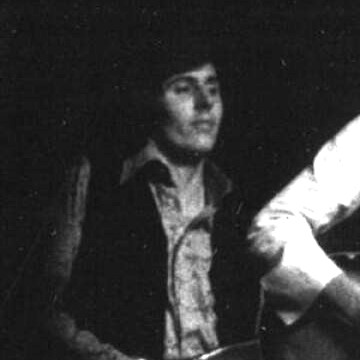
- Bernie Calvert (1970)

Background information
- Born: Bernard Bamford Calvert; 16 September 1942 (age 84); Brierfield, England
- Genres: Rock, pop
- Occupation: Musician
- Instruments: Bass, keyboards
- Years active: 1960s–1981
- Formerly of: Rickie Shaw and The Dolphins; The Hollies; Bread and Beer Band

Bernard Bamford Calvert (born 16 September 1942) is an English former musician who played bass guitar with The Hollies from 1966 until 1981.

== Career ==
He worked with several rock and roll groups during the early 1960s, most notably Rickie Shaw and the Dolphins, where he worked with future Hollies members, Tony Hicks and Bobby Elliott. Originally a pianist, Calvert, on Hicks's suggestion, switched to bass. Calvert was nicknamed "Bamf", which derived from his middle name, Bamford.

After the break-up of the Dolphins, Calvert played in a number of semi-professional outfits. However, unable to advance his musical career, Calvert took a factory job until he was asked to substitute for Hollies' then bassist, Eric Haydock, in a tour of Scandinavia. After the tour, Calvert and the Hollies played on the Everly Brothers album "Two Yanks in England", and then on the Hollies' single, "Bus Stop", before returning to his factory job. Shortly after that, he was invited to join the Hollies permanently in 1966. In 1981, Calvert left the band after they started working with The Shadows rhythm guitarist Bruce Welch as their producer. Calvert had been omitted from a session from Welch, and decided to leave the band all together after a phone call with Terry Sylvester, who himself also spoke about leaving. Sylvester left and Calvert followed a few days later. Calvert never returned to music.

Calvert was friends with Mama Cass Elliot from The Mamas & the Papas. She flew Calvert and the rest of the band to Los Angeles for his birthday. In early 1969, Calvert was in a "session supergroup" called The Bread and Beer Band, that featured Elton John, Caleb Quaye, Roger Pope, and Lennox & Rolfo. They recorded a single and album in February 1969. The single was released and the album was set to release in June of that year, but was shelved.

On 24 September 2009, the Hollies were nominated for induction to the Rock and Roll Hall of Fame, and were inducted on 15 March 2010. They were represented at the RRHOF ceremony by Allan Clarke, Graham Nash, Sylvester, Haydock and Calvert. Elliott and Hicks were unable to attend because they had a prior booking with the Hollies.

== See also ==
- List of bass guitarists
