= Clarke, Hicks & Nash Years: The Complete Hollies April 1963 – October 1968 =

2011 CD box set by The Hollies

Box set by The Hollies
- Released: 9 May 2011
- Recorded: 4 April 1963 to 28 August 1968
- Genres: Pop, beat
- Length: 6:40:32
- Label: EMI
- Producer: Ron Richards
- Compiler: Tim Chacksfield

Professional ratings
Review scores
Source	Rating
Record Collector	4/5 stars

Clarke, Hicks & Nash Years: The Complete Hollies April 1963 – October 1968 is a 6-CD box set released in the United Kingdom by EMI Records in 2011. As the title suggests, it encompasses, in chronological order by recording date, almost every song The Hollies have released to date that was recorded between April 1963 and October 1968, when Graham Nash left the band. Included were 14 previously unreleased tracks such as French-language versions of hit songs, alternate stereo mixes and a live set from the Lewisham Odeon recorded 24 May 1968. Besides various mono and stereo mixes of tracks, previously released material excluded from the set were the alternate version of "Stay" from the 1988 UK The Hollies: Compacts for Pleasure CD and the longer Take 9 of "Poison Ivy" from their first Australian LP.

The set was marketed as a moderately priced set, meaning that most of the tracks on this compilation were culled from earlier releases, resulting in a mix of mono and stereo tracks and the use of several different masterings dating back to 1997 when all of the Hollies early albums were issued as mono/stereo two-fers for EMI's 60th anniversary. The albums Stay with The Hollies, For Certain Because and Butterfly are presented in stereo here while In The Hollies Style, Hollies, Would You Believe? and Evolution are in mono. Several tracks including the previously unreleased material were digitally remastered by Peter Mew at Abbey Road Studios. Sequels to the set followed including Changin' Times: The Complete Hollies January 1969 - March 1973, released in 2015, and Head Out Of Dreams: The Complete Hollies August 1973 - May 1988 in 2017.

== Track listing ==
All songs written by Allan Clarke, Tony Hicks & Graham Nash unless noted.
Tracks marked '†', indicate a stereo mix; all other tracks being in mono.

- "*" Previously unreleased version
- +1997 digital remaster
- ++2011 digital remaster
- +++1998 digital remaster
- ++++1999 digital remaster

=== Disc one ===
1. "Whole World Over" (Allan Clarke, Graham Nash) – 2:01+
2. "(Ain't That) Just Like Me" (Earl Carroll, Billy Guy) – 2:09+
3. "Hey What's Wrong With Me" (Nash) – 1:52+
  - Tracks 1–3 Recorded at EMI Studios, London, England, 4 April 1963
4. "Now's the Time" (Clarke, Nash) – 2:03+
5. "Little Lover" (Nash, Clarke) – 2:03^{†}
6. "Zip-a-Dee-Doo-Dah" (Wray Gilbert, Allie Wrubel) – 2:38++
  - Tracks 4–6 Recorded at EMI Studios, London, 15 May 1963
7. "I Understand" (Kim Gannon, Mabel Wayne) – 2:43++^{†}
  - Track 7 Recorded at EMI Studios, London, 15 July 1963
8. "Searchin'" (Jerry Leiber, Mike Stoller) – 2:26+^{†}
  - Track 8 Recorded at EMI Studios, London, 25 July 1963
9. "Stay" (Maurice Williams) – 2:16+
10. "Poison Ivy" (Leiber, Stoller) – 1:59+
  - Tracks 9–10 Recorded at EMI Studios, London, 11 October 1963
11. "Memphis" (Chuck Berry) – 2:36^{†}
12. "Talkin' 'bout You" (Berry) – 2:11^{†}
13. "It's Only Make Believe" (Conway Twitty, Jack Nance) – 3:18^{†}
14. "Lucille" (Albert Collins, Little Richard) – 2:29^{†}
15. "Baby Don't Cry" (Tony Hiller, Perry Ford) – 2:09^{†}
16. "Do You Love Me" (Berry Gordy Jr.) – 2:13^{†}
  - Tracks 11–16 Recorded at EMI Studios, London, 29 October 1963
17. "Mr. Moonlight" (Roy Lee Johnson) – 2:05^{†}
18. "You Better Move On" (Arthur Alexander) – 2:48^{†}
19. "Whatcha Gonna Do 'bout It?" (Carroll, Doris Payne) – 2:21^{†}
20. "What Kind of Girl are You" (Ray Charles) – 3:04^{†}
21. "Rockin' Robin" (Jimmie Thomas) – 2:17^{†}
  - Tracks 17–21 Recorded at EMI Studios, London, 11 December 1963
22. "Keep Off That Friend of Mine" (Bobby Elliott, Tony Hicks) – 2:05+
  - Track 22 Recorded at EMI Studios, London, 11 December 1963
23. "Just One Look" (Carroll, Payne) – 2:31+^{†}
24. "Candy Man" (Fred Neil, Beverly Ross) – 2:36^{†}
  - Tracks 23–24 Recorded at EMI Studios, London, 27 January 1964
25. "When I'm Not There" (Hicks) – 1:49++
26. "What Kind of Love" – 1:46++
  - Tracks 25–26 Recorded at EMI Studios, London, 2 March 1964
27. "Here I Go Again" (Mort Shuman, Clive Westlake) – 2:19^{†}
28. "Baby That's All" – 2:17+
  - Tracks 27–28 Recorded at EMI Studios, London, 13 April 1964

=== Disc two ===
1. "Time for Love" – 2:31+
2. "Don't You Know" – 1:57++
  - Tracks 1–2 Recorded at EMI Studios, London, 13 April 1964
3. "You'll Be Mine" – 2:02
4. "It's in Her Kiss" (Rudy Clark) – 2:15+
5. "Come on Home" – 1:53+
6. "Too Much Monkey Business" (Berry) – 2:28+
7. "I Thought of You Last Night" (Ralph Freed) – 2:18+
  - Tracks 3–7 Recorded at EMI Studios, London, 27 April 1964
8. "Come on Back" – 2:12+
9. "Set Me Free" – 2:28+
10. "Please Don't Feel Too Bad" – 2:27+
  - Tracks 8–10 Recorded at EMI Studios, London, 30 June 1964
11. "What Kind of Boy" (Big Dee Irwin) – 2:38+
12. "We're Through" (Alternate Arrangement) – 2:19+
  - Tracks 11–12 Recorded at EMI Studios, London, 16 August 1964
13. "We're Through" – 2:15+^{†}
14. "To You My Love" – 2:08+
15. "Nitty Gritty/Something's Got a Hold on Me" (Lincoln Chase/Etta James, Leroy Kirkland, Pearl Woods) – 4:13+
  - Tracks 13–15 Recorded at EMI Studios, London, 25 August 1964
16. "Put Yourself in My Place" – 2:40+
17. "She Said Yeah" (Sonny Christy, Roddy Jackson) – 1:43
  - Tracks 16–17 Recorded at EMI Studios, London, 10 November 1964
18. "Yes I Will" (Alternate Arrangement) (Gerry Goffin, Russ Titelman) – 3:31^{†}
19. "When I Come Home to You" – 2:26+
20. "Nobody" – 2:40+
21. "You Know He Did" – 2:03+
  - Tracks 18–21 Recorded at EMI Studios, London, 15 December 1964
22. "Yes I Will" (Goffin. Titelman) – 2:57^{†}
  - Track 22 Recorded at EMI Studios, London, 3 January 1965
23. "Mickey's Monkey" (Holland-Dozier-Holland) – 2:30+
24. "That's My Desire" (Carroll Loveday, Helmy Kresa) – 2:27+
25. "Very Last Day" (Noel Stookey, Peter Yarrow) – 2:58+^{†}
  - Tracks 23–25 Recorded at EMI Studios, London, 1 March 1965
26. "Honey and Wine" (2003 Digital Remaster) (Goffin, Carole King) – 2:29
  - Track 26 Recorded at EMI Studios, London, 7 April 1965

=== Disc three ===
1. "Listen Here to Me (Demo)" – 2:04
2. "So Lonely (Demo)" – 2:45
3. "Bring Back Your Love to Me (Demo)" – 1:43
  - Tracks 1–3 Recorded at Bell Studios, New York City, 27 April 1965
4. "I'm Alive" (2003 Digital Remaster) (Clint Ballard Jr.) – 2:27^{†}
  - Track 4 Recorded at EMI Studios, London, 5 May 1965
5. "Look Through Any Window" (Graham Gouldman, Charles Silverman) – 2:18^{†}
6. "Lawdy Miss Clawdy" (Lloyd Price) – 1:50+
7. "You Must Believe Me" (Curtis Mayfield) – 2:08+
8. "Little Bitty Pretty One" (Bobby Day) – 2:15++*
  - Tracks 5–8 Recorded at EMI Studios, London, 30 June 1965
9. "Down the Line" (Roy Orbison) – 2:03+
10. "Fortune Teller" (Naomi Neville) – 2:27+
11. "Too Many People" – 2:38+
12. "So Lonely" – 2:36+
13. "I've Been Wrong" – 1:56+
  - Tracks 9–13 Recorded at EMI Studios, London, 13 July 1965
14. "Stewball" (Bob Yellin, Ralph Rinzler, John Herald) – 3:10+++
15. "She Gives Me Everything I Want" – 2:20++^{†}
  - Tracks 14–15 Recorded at EMI Studios, London, 14 September 1965
16. "I Can't Get Nowhere With You" – 1:50++^{†}
  - Track 16 Recorded at Roulette Studios, New York, 22 September 1965
17. "I've Got a Way of My Own" (2003 Digital Remaster) – 2:19^{†}
18. "You in My Arms" – 2:01++^{†}
  - Tracks 17–18 Recorded at EMI Studios, London, 13 October 1965
19. "Don't Even Think About Changing" – 2:13++++^{†}
20. "If I Needed Someone" (George Harrison) – 2:19^{†}
21. "Running Through the Night" – 1:50+^{†}
  - Tracks 19–21 Recorded at EMI Studios, London, 17 November 1965
22. "Don't You Even Care (What's Gonna Happen to Me)" (Ballard Jr.) – 2:31
  - Track 22 Recorded at EMI Studios, London, 13 January 1966
23. "I Can't Let Go" (Chip Taylor, Al Gorgoni) – 2:27++
  - Track 23 Recorded at EMI Studios, London, 13 & 18 January 1966
24. "Oriental Sadness" – 2:42+++
  - Track 24 Recorded at EMI Studios, London, 28 February 1966
25. "Stewball (French Lyric Version)" (Yellin, Rinzler, Herald) – 3:05+^{†}*
26. "Look Through Any Window (French Lyric Version)" (Gouldman, Silverman) – 2:18
  - Tracks 25–26 Recorded at EMI Studios, London, 20 December 1965 & 4 January 1966
27. "You Know He Did (French Lyric Version)" – 2:04*
28. "We're Through (French Lyric Version)" – 2:16+++*
  - Tracks 27–28 Recorded at EMI Studios, London, 22 February 1966

=== Disc four ===
1. "I Take What I Want" (David Porter, Mabon "Teenie" Hodges, Isaac Hayes) – 2:15+++
2. "Hard Hard Year" – 2:20+++
  - Tracks 1–2 Recorded at EMI Studios, London, 28 February 1966
3. "A Taste of Honey" (1966 Version) (Richard Marlow, Bobby Scott) – 2:11^{†}
4. "That's How Strong My Love Is" (Roosevelt Jamison) – 2:50+++
5. "Take Your Time" (Buddy Holly, Norman Petty) – 2:18
6. "Fifi the Flea" – 2:12
  - Tracks 3–6 Recorded at EMI Studios, London, 1 March 1966
7. "Sweet Little Sixteen" (Berry) – 2:21
8. "I Am a Rock" (Paul Simon) – 2:48
  - Tracks 7–8 Recorded at EMI Studios, London, 25 March 1966
9. "After the Fox (With Peter Sellers" (Burt Bacharach, Hal David) – 2:19^{†}
  - Track 9 Recorded at EMI Studios, London, 10 May 1966
10. "Don't Run and Hide" – 2:35^{†}
  - Track 10 Recorded at EMI Studios, London, 17 May 1966
11. "Bus Stop" (2003 Digital Remaster) (Gouldman) – 2:54^{†}
  - Track 11 Recorded at EMI Studios, London, 18 May 1966
12. "Peculiar Situation" – 2:51++++^{†}
13. "Suspicious Look in Your Eyes" – 3:37++++^{†}
  - Tracks 12–13 Recorded at EMI Studios, London, 16 August 1966
14. "Stop Stop Stop" – 2:58^{†}
  - Track 14 Recorded at EMI Studios, London, 20 June & 17 August 1966
15. "Tell Me to My Face" – 3:09++++^{†}
  - Track 15 Recorded at EMI Studios, London, 16 & 22 August 1966
16. "Pay You Back With Interest" – 2:46++++^{†}
  - Track 16 Recorded at EMI Studios, London, 22 August 1966
17. "Clown" – 2:16++++^{†}
18. "It's You" – 2:17++++^{†}
19. "Crusader" – 3:48++++^{†}
  - Tracks 17–19 Recorded at EMI Studios, London, 23–24 August 1966
20. "What's Wrong With the Way I Live" – 2:02++++^{†}
  - Track 20 Recorded at EMI Studios, London, 31 August 1966
21. "What Went Wrong" – 2:12++++^{†}
22. "High Classed" – 2:21++++^{†}
  - Tracks 21–22 Recorded at EMI Studios, London, 17 October 1966
23. "All the World is Love" – 2:15++^{†}
24. "When Your Light's Turned On" – 2:37++++
25. "Have You Ever Loved Somebody" – 3:04++++
  - Tracks 23–25 Recorded at EMI Studios, London, 11 January 1967
26. "Non Prego Per Me" (Italian A-side) (Lucio Battisti/Giulio Rapetti) – 2:45^{†}*
27. "Devi Avere Fiducia in Me" (Italian B-side) (Renato Martini/Francesco Specchia) – 2:11^{†}*
  - Tracks 26–27 Recorded at EMI Studios, London, 13 January 1967

=== Disc five ===
1. "Lullaby to Tim" – 3:04++++
  - Track 1 Recorded at EMI Studios, London, 13 January 1967
2. "On a Carousel" – 3:12^{†}
  - Track 2 Recorded at EMI Studios, London, 11 & 13 January 1967
3. "We're Alive" (2003 Digital Remaster) – 2:38
4. "Kill Me Quick" (2003 Digital Remaster) – 2:16^{†}
  - Tracks 3–4 Recorded at EMI Studios, London, 22 February 1967
5. "Leave Me" – 2:20++++
  - Track 5 Recorded at EMI Studios, London, 3 March 1967
6. "The Games We Play" – 2:46++++
7. "Schoolgirl" (Gouldman) – 3:06
  - Tracks 6–7 Recorded at EMI Studios, London, 22 February & 3 March 1967. Track 7 Completed November 1997
8. "Rain on the Window" – 3:16++++
9. "Then the Heartaches Begin" – 2:48++++
10. "Ye Olde Toffee Shoppe" – 2:22++++
11. "You Need Love" – 2:32++++
12. "Stop Right There" – 2:28++++
  - Tracks 8–12 Recorded at EMI Studios, London, 3 & 17 March 1967
13. "Water on the Brain" – 2:27++++
14. "Heading for a Fall" – 2:23++++
  - Tracks 13–14 Recorded at EMI Studios, London, 8 & 17 March 1967
15. "Carrie Anne" (2003 Digital Remaster) – 2:54^{†}
  - Track 15 Recorded at EMI Studios, London, 1 May 1967
16. "Signs That Will Never Change" (2003 Digital Remaster) – 2:38
  - Track 16 Recorded at EMI Studios, London, 2 May 1967
17. "King Midas in Reverse" (2003 Digital Remaster) – 3:03^{†}
  - Track 17 Recorded at EMI Studios, London, 3 & 4 August 1967
18. "Try It" (Clarke, Nash) – 3:11++++^{†}
  - Track 18 Recorded at EMI Studios, London, 5 September 1967
19. "Everything is Sunshine" (2003 Digital Remaster) – 1:58^{†}
  - Track 19 Recorded at EMI Studios, London, 3 August & 5 September 1967
20. "Wishyouawish" (Clarke, Nash) – 2:17++++^{†}
21. "Postcard" (Nash) – 2:20++++^{†}
  - Tracks 20–21 Recorded at EMI Studios, London, 5 September 1967
22. "Step Inside" – 2:59++++^{†}
  - Track 22 Recorded at EMI Studios, London, 1 August & 5 September 1967
23. "Pegasus" (Hicks) – 2:41++++^{†}
  - Track 23 Recorded at EMI Studios, London, 12 September 1967
24. "Dear Eloise" – 3:10++++^{†}
  - Track 24 Recorded at EMI Studios, London, 26 September 1967

=== Disc six ===
1. "Elevated Observations?" – 2:38++++^{†}
  - Track 1 Recorded at EMI Studios, London, 26 September 1967
2. "Would You Believe" (Clarke) – 4:25++++^{†}
  - Track 2 Recorded at EMI Studios, London, 5 & 12 September 5 October 1967
3. "Away Away Away" (Nash) – 2:26++++^{†}
  - Track 3 Recorded at EMI Studios, London, 5 September & 5 October 1967
4. "Charlie and Fred" (Clarke, Nash) – 3:01++++^{†}
  - Track 4 Recorded at EMI Studios, London, 1 August & 5 October 1967
5. "Butterfly" (Nash) – 2:52++++^{†}
  - Track 5 Recorded at EMI Studios, London, 5 October 1967
6. "Maker" (Nash) – 3:14++++^{†}
  - Track 6 Recorded at EMI Studios, London, 3 August & 6 October 1967
7. "Open Up Your Eyes" – 2:51++^{†}
8. "Wings" (2003 Digital Remaster) (Clarke, Nash) – 3:05^{†}
  - Tracks 7–8 Recorded at EMI Studios, London, 9 & 11 January 1968
9. "Jennifer Eccles" (Clarke, Nash) – 3:01^{†}
  - Track 9 Recorded at Chappells, London, 3 February 1968 and EMI Studios, London, 22 February 1968
10. "Tomorrow When It Comes" (Clarke, Nash) – 2:43++^{†}
11. "Relax" (2003 Digital Remaster) (Nash) – 1:40^{†}
  - Tracks 10–11 Recorded at EMI Studios, London, 26 & 27 March 1968
12. "Do the Best You Can" – 2:49++^{†}
13. "Like Every Time Before" (2003 Digital Remaster) – 2:10^{†}
  - Tracks 12–13 Recorded at Chappells, London, 14 & 15 May 1968
14. "Man With No Expression" (Nash, Terry Reid) – 3:25^{†}
15. "Blowin' in the Wind (Nash Version)" (2003 Digital Remaster) (Bob Dylan) – 4:09^{†}
  - Tracks 14–15 Recorded at EMI Studios, London, 14 & 15 August 1968
16. "A Taste of Honey (1968 Version)" (2003 Digital Remaster) (Marlow, Scott) – 2:35^{†}
  - Track 16 Recorded at EMI Studios, London, 12–16 August 1968
17. "Listen to Me" (Tony Hazzard) – 2:37+++^{†}
  - Track 17 Recorded at EMI Studios, London, 28 August 1968
18. "Stop Stop Stop" – 2:51^{†}*
19. "Look Through Any Window" (Gouldman, Silverman) – 2:31^{†}*
20. "The Times They Are a-Changin'" (Dylan) – 3:20^{†}
21. "On a Carousel" – 3:17^{†}*
22. "King Midas in Reverse" – 3:17^{†}*
23. "Butterfly" (Nash) – 3:29^{†}*
24. "Jennifer Eccles" (Clarke, Nash) – 2:43^{†}*
25. "Carrie Anne" – 2:58^{†}*
  - Tracks 18–25 Recorded Live at Lewisham Odeon Theatre, London, 24 May 1968

== Personnel ==
- Allan Clarke – vocals, harmonica, guitar
- Tony Hicks – lead guitar, vocals
- Graham Nash – rhythm guitar, vocals
- Bobby Elliott – drums, percussion except as noted
- Don Rathbone – drums, percussion on Disc one, tracks 1–8
- Eric Haydock – bass guitar from start through Disc four, track 8
- Jack Bruce – bass guitar on Disc four, track 9
- John Paul Jones – bass guitar on Disc four, track 10
- Bernie Calvert – bass guitar from Disc four, track 11 through end
