= The Hollies' Greatest Hits (1967 album) =

Greatest hits album by the Hollies
- Released: May 1967
- Recorded: 1963–1967
- Genre: Pop
- Label: Imperial (US); Capitol (Canada)
- Producer: Ron Richards

The Hollies US/Canadian chronology
Stop! Stop! Stop! (1966)	The Hollies' Greatest Hits (1967)	Evolution (1967)

The Hollies' Greatest Hits was the first greatest hits collection by English pop group the Hollies. The album was released by Imperial Records in the US in May 1967 and by Capitol Records in Canada, under the title The Hits of the Hollies and with two different tracks, in July 1967. It was the Hollies' highest charting album in the US, peaking at number eleven during a chart stay of forty weeks. When Imperial was dissolved into United Artists Records in 1971, this album went out of print, prompting Epic (the group's then-current label) to issue its own "Greatest Hits" album two years later.

The album was available in both mono and stereo formats. A little over half of the songs on the stereo version were electronically altered (e), meaning that the mono tapes were used. The Canadian version of the album deleted the songs "Memphis" and "Tell Me to My Face", substituting early Hollies hits "Stay" and "(Ain't That) Just Like Me".

Neither Capitol Records, which assumed control of the United Artists catalog in 1979, nor Parlophone Records, the current holder of the group's catalog, have issued this album on CD, as the 1973 US/Canadian greatest hits album on Epic, also titled The Hollies' Greatest Hits, contains six of these hits ("Bus Stop", "Pay You Back With Interest", "Look Through Any Window", "Stop Stop Stop", "Just One Look" and "On a Carousel"). A version for sale in New Zealand was similar to the US version but added "Dear Eloise" and "King Midas in Reverse" to give a total of 14 tracks compared to the US/Canadian 12 tracks.

== Track listing ==
All tracks composed by Graham Nash, Allan Clarke and Tony Hicks, except where indicated.

=== Side 1 ===
1. "Bus Stop" § e (Graham Gouldman) – 2:51 (from Bus Stop)
2. "Pay You Back with Interest" § stereo – 2:39 (from Stop! Stop! Stop!)
3. "Here I Go Again" e (Clive Westlake, Mort Shuman) – 2:17 (from Here I Go Again)
4. "Tell Me to My Face" § stereo – 3:02 (from Stop! Stop! Stop!)
5. "I'm Alive" e (Clint Ballard Jr.) – 2:22 (from Hear! Here!)
6. "Look Through Any Window" (Gouldman, Charles Silverman) – 2:16 (from Hear! Here!)

=== Side 2 ===
1. "Stop Stop Stop" § stereo – 2:52 (from Stop! Stop! Stop!)
2. "Whatcha Gonna Do 'Bout It" stereo (Doris Payne, Gregory Carroll) – 2:17 (from Bus Stop)
3. "Just One Look" e (Payne, Carroll) – 2:30 (from Here I Go Again)
4. "Memphis" e (Chuck Berry) – 2:30 (from Here I Go Again)
5. "I Can't Let Go" stereo (Chip Taylor-Al Gorgoni) – 2:25 (from Beat Group!)
6. "On a Carousel" § e – 3:08 (from Imperial single 66231)

== Canadian Track Listing ==
All tracks composed by Graham Nash, Allan Clarke and Tony Hicks, except where indicated. Also indicates the original Canadian LP's

=== Side 1 ===
1. "Stop Stop Stop" § – 2:52 (from Stop! Stop! Stop!)
2. "Look Through Any Window" (Graham Gouldman, Charles Silverman) – 2:16 (from I Can't Let Go / Look Through Any Window)
3. "I Can't Let Go" (Chip Taylor-Al Gorgoni) – 2:25 (from I Can't Let Go / Look Through Any Window)
4. "Stay" (Maurice Williams) - 2:13 (from Stay with The Hollies)
5. "Pay You Back with Interest" § – 2:39 (from Stop! Stop! Stop!)
6. "Here I Go Again" (Clive Westlake, Mort Shuman) – 2:17 (from Stay with The Hollies)

=== Side 2 ===
1. "Bus Stop" § (Graham Gouldman) – 2:51 (from Bus Stop)
2. "I'm Alive" (Clint Ballard Jr.) – 2:22 (from In The Hollies Style)
3. "(Ain't That) Just Like Me" (Earl Carroll, Billy Guy) - 2:09 (from Stay with The Hollies)
4. "On a Carousel" § – 3:08 (from Capitol of Canada single 72450)
5. "Whatcha Gonna Do 'Bout It" (Doris Payne, Gregory Carroll) – 2:17 (non-single LP debut)
6. "Just One Look" (Payne, Carroll) – 2:30 (from Stay with The Hollies)

== Personnel ==
- Allan Clarke - vocals, harmonica, guitar
- Tony Hicks - lead guitar, vocals
- Graham Nash - rhythm guitar, vocals
- Eric Haydock - bass guitar
- Bernie Calvert - bass guitar on §
- Bobby Elliott - drums
- Don Rathbone - drums on "(Ain't That) Just Like Me"
