= Would You Believe? (Hollies album) =

1966 studio album by the Hollies

Studio album by the Hollies
- Released: 1 July 1966
- Recorded: 14 September 1965 – 25 March 1966
- Studio: EMI, London
- Genre: Rock; pop
- Length: 29:26
- Label: Parlophone PMC 7008 (Mono)
- Producer: Ron Richards

The Hollies chronology
Hollies (1965)	Would You Believe? (1966)	For Certain Because (1966)

Would You Believe? is the fourth UK album by the Hollies, released in 1966.

== Overview ==
The album includes covers of Simon and Garfunkel's "I Am a Rock", Chuck Berry's "Sweet Little Sixteen", and Evie Sands' "I Can't Let Go", which became a major hit for the Hollies.

This was the Hollies' last album with original bass player Eric Haydock, who took a leave of absence from the group after the American tour that followed the last recording session for the album, missing the recording session for the follow-up single "Bus Stop".

Both the stereo and mono mixes of Would You Believe? were digitally remastered at EMI Studios (now Abbey Road Studios) by Peter Mew in March 1998. In the UK, the remastered album was released with both mixes on one disc.

== Recording ==
Would You Believe? was recorded at EMI Studios in London, UK and was produced by Ron Richards. Recording for the album commenced on 14 September 1965 when the band recorded the traditional folk-song "Stewball". Recording continued on 13 October, when "I've Got a Way of My Own" was put to tape.

The group then did not enter the studio for exactly three months, returning 13 January 1966 to record "Don't You Even Care" and the eventual single "I Can't Let Go" (the latter was later completed on 18 January). Three more songs, "Oriental Sadness", "I Take What I Want", and "Hard Hard Year" were recorded on 28 February. The following day, three more songs were put to tape: "That's How Strong My Love Is", "Take Your Time", and "Fifi the Flea". The final songs recorded before the album's release in June were "Sweet Little Sixteen" and "I Am a Rock" on 25 March.

== Track listing ==
All songs attributed to "Ransford" are by Allan Clarke, Tony Hicks and Graham Nash

Side one
No.	Title	Writer(s)	Lead vocals	Length
1.	"I Take What I Want"	David Porter, Mabon "Teenie" Hodges, Isaac Hayes	Clarke	2:15
2.	"Hard Hard Year"	Ransford	Clarke	2:13
3.	"That's How Strong My Love Is"	Roosevelt Jamison	Clarke	2:42
4.	"Sweet Little Sixteen"	Chuck Berry	Clarke	2:21
5.	"Oriental Sadness"	Ransford	Clarke and Nash	2:37
6.	"I Am a Rock"	Paul Simon	Clarke	2:48

Side two
No.	Title	Writer(s)	Lead vocals	Length
7.	"Take Your Time"	Buddy Holly, Norman Petty	Clarke, Nash	2:18
8.	"Don't You Even Care"	Clint Ballard, Jr.	Clarke	2:27
9.	"Fifi the Flea"	Ransford	Nash	2:05
10.	"Stewball"	Bob Yellin, Ralph Rinzler, John Herald	Clarke, Nash, and Hicks	3:05
11.	"I've Got a Way of My Own"	Ransford	Clarke and Nash	2:12
12.	"I Can't Let Go"	Chip Taylor, Al Gorgoni	Clarke and Nash	2:26

== US album (Beat Group!) ==
Beat Group!

Studio album by the Hollies
- Released: May 1966 (US); 6 June 1966 (Canada)
- Recorded: 17 November 1965 – 1 March 1966 (except 11 December 1963 for "Mr. Moonlight")
- Genre: Rock; pop
- Length: 25:31
- Label: Imperial LP-9312/12312 (US); Capitol (D)T-6152 (Canada)
- Producer: Ron Richards

The Hollies US chronology
Hear! Here! (1965)	Beat Group! (1966)	Bus Stop (1966)

The Hollies Canadian chronology
In The Hollies Style (1965)	I Can't Let Go / Look Through Any Window (1966)	Bus Stop (1966)

The Hollies' third US album was released under the title Beat Group! (Imperial LP-9312 (Mono)/LP-12312 (Stereo)) one month before Would You Believe? was released in the UK. In Canada, Capitol retitled the album I Can't Let Go/Look Through Any Window after the two hit singles, and released it on 6 June 1966.

To fill in the US album, the new recordings "Running Through the Night" (the UK B-side of "I Can't Let Go") and "A Taste of Honey" plus the 1963 track "Mr. Moonlight" were included, while the cover songs "Stewball", "Sweet Little Sixteen" and "I Am a Rock" plus the original "I've Got a Way of My Own" were omitted. The Canadian version was similar, except that the single "Look Through Any Window" (which had appeared on the US album Hear! Here!) and "Stewball" were also included and "Mr. Moonlight" (which had been included on the Canadian Stay with The Hollies) and "Don't You Even Care" were omitted.

Several tracks from Would You Believe? that weren't used for this album were carried over to the next US/Canadian album Bus Stop, released in mid-1966, which compiled those, the title track and other stray songs from previous UK albums and singles, again dating as far back as 1963. The version of "A Taste of Honey" on this album was recorded for Would You Believe? but omitted from the album and thus wasn't released in the UK at the time. It differs from the version released on the box set The Long Road Home, which was recorded in 1968.

=== US track listing ===
Side 1

1. "I Can't Let Go"
2. "That's How Strong My Love Is"
3. "Running Through the Night" (L. Ransford)
4. "Oriental Sadness (She'll Never Trust in Anybody No More)"
5. "A Taste of Honey" (Bobby Scott, Ric Marlow)
6. "Mr. Moonlight" (Roy Lee Johnson)

Side 2

1. "Don't You Even Care"
2. "Hard, Hard Year"
3. "Take Your Time"
4. "Fifi the Flea"
5. "I Take What I Want"

=== Canadian track listing ===
Side 1

1. "That's How Strong My Love Is"
2. "Stewball"
3. "Take Your Time"
4. "Running Through the Night" (L. Ransford)
5. "Fifi the Flea"
6. "Look Through Any Window" (Graham Gouldman, Charles Silverman)

Side 2

1. "A Taste of Honey" (Bobby Scott, Ric Marlow)
2. "Hard, Hard Year"
3. "I Take What I Want"
4. "Oriental Sadness (She'll Never Trust in Anybody No More)"
5. "I Can't Let Go"

== Personnel ==
- Allan Clarke – vocals, harmonica
- Bobby Elliott – drums
- Eric Haydock – bass guitar
- Tony Hicks – lead guitar, vocals
- Graham Nash – rhythm guitar, vocals
