= Hollies (1965 album) =

1965 studio album by the Hollies

Studio album by the Hollies
- Released: September 1965
- Recorded: 10 November 1964 – 13 July 1965
- Studio: EMI, London
- Genre: Rock; Pop; Beat; Gospel
- Length: 28:36
- Label: Parlophone EMI PMC 1261 (Mono)
- Producer: Ron Richards

The Hollies chronology
In the Hollies Style (1964)	Hollies (1965)	Would You Believe? (1966)

Professional ratings
Review scores
Source	Rating
AllMusic	4/5 stars
The Encyclopedia of Popular Music	4/5 stars
Record Mirror	4/5 stars
Uncut	2/5 stars

Hollies is the Hollies' third studio album for Parlophone. It is also referred to as Hollies '65 to differentiate it from the similarly titled 1974 album. It went to No. 8 in the UK album charts. Originally available in mono only, it was reissued in stereo under the title Reflection in 1969. In 1997, British EMI put both mono and stereo versions of this album onto a single CD.

Of the twelve tracks on this album, only "So Lonely" was issued on 45 in Great Britain; even then, it was the B-side to the 1965 hit "Look Through Any Window", a song recorded concurrent with the rest of this album. On the original album, only five of the twelve songs are band originals, attributed at the time to the pseudonym "L. Ransford" but actually written by Allan Clarke, Tony Hicks and Graham Nash. The rest were covers.

In Scandinavia the Gospel song, "Very Last Day" and "Too Many People" were issued on 45, with the former becoming a major hit in Sweden. "Very Last Day" was a Christian/Gospel song first released by Peter, Paul, and Mary, dealing with the Christian concept of judgement day and the equality all mankind will feel when facing it, and the topic aligned well with the cultural climate at the time. Due to the success of "Very Last Day" in Sweden, they made numerous performances (including Top of the Pops) that aired around the same time, to promote it, and it has been categorized as one of their greatest hits.

The song "Put Yourself in My Place" (written by Clarke, Hicks and Nash) was also recorded by Episode Six and became their 1966 debut single.

== Track listing ==
Side one
No.	Title	Writer(s)	Lead vocals	Length
1.	"Very Last Day"	Noel Stookey, Peter Yarrow	Clarke	2:58
2.	"You Must Believe Me"	Curtis Mayfield	Clarke	2:08
3.	"Put Yourself in My Place"	L. Ransford	Clarke and Nash	2:40
4.	"Down the Line"	Roy Orbison	Clarke	2:03
5.	"That's My Desire"	Carroll Loveday, Helmy Kresa	Clarke, Hicks, Nash Bridge: Clarke	2:27
6.	"Too Many People"	L. Ransford	Clarke	2:38

Side two
No.	Title	Writer(s)	Lead vocals	Length
7.	"Lawdy Miss Clawdy"	Lloyd Price	Clarke	1:50
8.	"When I Come Home to You"	L. Ransford	Clarke	2:26
9.	"Fortune Teller"	Naomi Neville	Clarke and Nash	2:27
10.	"So Lonely"	L. Ransford	Clarke and Nash	2:36
11.	"I've Been Wrong"	L. Ransford	Clarke and Nash	1:56
12.	"Mickey's Monkey"	Holland-Dozier-Holland	Clarke	2:30

- Note: All songs attributed to the pseudonym "L. Ransford" were written by Allan Clarke, Tony Hicks and Graham Nash.

== Hear! Here! (US version) ==
Hear! Here!

Studio album by the Hollies
- Released: November 1965
- Recorded: 10 November 1964 – 13 July 1965
- Genre: Rock; pop; beat; Rock
- Length: 28:26
- Label: Imperial
- Producer: Ron Richards

the Hollies US chronology
Here I Go Again (1964)	Hear! Here! (1965)	Beat Group! (1966)

Professional ratings
Review scores
Source	Rating
AllMusic	3/5 stars

More than a year after the release of the Hollies' US debut album, Here I Go Again, the success of "Look Through Any Window" (The Hollies' first Top 40 hit in the US) inspired Imperial Records, the Hollies' US label, to finally release another Hollies LP.

In November 1965, Imperial released Hollies, with a slightly different track listing, as Hear! Here! in the US. Imperial removed "Fortune Teller" and "Mickey's Monkey" from Hollies and added the singles "I'm Alive" and "Look Through Any Window". The track listing was then re-arranged so that the singles started each of the sides.

Although the album is clearly a US repackaging of the Hollies album, the cover uses the photo from the UK In The Hollies Style LP, which was never released in the USA.

"Mickey's Monkey" later appeared in 1966 on the forthcoming "Bus Stop" album, but "Fortune Teller" was never issued in the US until the 1990s. In 2010, the mono version of this LP was reissued on 180-gram vinyl in the US by Sundazed Music.

=== Track listing ===
All tracks are written by L. Ransford, except were noted.

Side one
No.	Title	Length
1.	"I'm Alive" (Clint Ballard Jr.)	2:22
2.	"Very Last Day" (Paul Stookey, Peter Yarrow)	2:50
3.	"You Must Believe Me" (Curtis Mayfield)	2:05
4.	"Put Yourself in My Place"	2:35
5.	"Down the Line" (Roy Orbison)	2:00
6.	"That's My Desire" (Carroll Lovesday, Helma Kresa)	2:30

Side two
No.	Title	Length
7.	"Look Through Any Window" (Charles Silverman, Graham Gouldman)	2:16
8.	"Lawdy Miss Clawdy" (Lloyd Price)	1:50
9.	"When I Come Home to You"	2:24
10.	"So Lonely"	2:36
11.	"I've Been Wrong"	1:54
12.	"Too Many People"	2:40

== Love N' Flowers (Canadian version) ==
Love N' Flowers

Studio album by the Hollies
- Released: November 1967
- Studio: Abbey Road Studios, London
- Genre: Beat, Rock
- Label: Capitol (D)T-6245
- Producer: Ron Richards

the Hollies Canadian chronology
Evolution (1967)	Love N' Flowers (1967)	Dear Eloise / King Midas in Reverse (1968)

In 1967, the Hollies transferred the US and Canadian rights to all new material to Epic Records. Unlike Imperial Records in the US, Capitol Canada had opted not to issue a version of Hollies when it was released in 1965, choosing instead to release an edited version of the almost year-old album In The Hollies Style. However, even though all of the Hollies' master rights were owned by Capitol Records' parent company, EMI, Capitol Canada decided to counterprogram against The Hollies' first Epic release, Evolution. In November 1967, one month after the release of Evolution, Capitol Canada repackaged Hollies with a "flower child" cover (a later picture of The Hollies standing amidst tree branches under a title bar with flowered wallpaper, as shown) and issued it under the name Love N' Flowers. Capitol Canada had previously released two tracks from Hollies ("Very Last Day" and "Too Many People") on the Canadian version of Bus Stop, and a third track ("Mickey's Monkey") had been included on In The Hollies Style, leaving nine tracks from the album unissued in Canada. Capitol Canada added one of the tracks that it did not use from the UK version of In The Hollies Style ("I Thought of You Last Night") to make up the ten songs included on Love N' Flowers.

This was the last new release in the Hollies catalogue from Capitol Canada.

=== Track listing ===
Side 1

1. "You Must Believe Me"
2. "Put Yourself in My Place"
3. "Down the Line"
4. "That's My Desire"
5. "Lawdy Miss Clawdy"

Side 2

1. "When I Come Home to You"
2. "Fortune Teller"
3. "So Lonely"
4. "I've Been Wrong"
5. "I Thought of You Last Night" (Ralph Freed) – 2:18

== Personnel ==
The Hollies

- Allan Clarke – vocals, harmonica
- Bobby Elliott – drums
- Eric Haydock – bass guitar
- Tony Hicks – lead guitar, vocals
- Graham Nash – rhythm guitar, vocals

Additional personnel

- Ron Richards – production
- Alan Hawkshaw – piano on "Put Yourself in My Place"
