= Bus Stop (album) =

Studio album by the Hollies
- Released: October 1966
- Recorded: 1963–1966
- Genre: Rock, pop
- Length: 29:12
- Label: Imperial LP-9330
- Producer: Ron Richards

The Hollies U.S. chronology
Beat Group! (1966)	Bus Stop (1966)	Stop! Stop! Stop! (1966)

The Hollies Canadian chronology
I Can't Let Go / Look Through Any Window (1966)	Bus Stop (1966)	Stop! Stop! Stop! (1966)

Professional ratings
Review scores
Source	Rating
Allmusic	3/5 stars

Bus Stop is the fourth U.S. album by the British pop band the Hollies, released on Imperial Records in mono (LP-9330) and rechanneled stereo (LP-12330) in October 1966. It features songs ranging from both sides of the band's then-current hit single to material recorded in the Hollies' early days on the UK's Parlophone Records in 1963, 1964 and 1965. The song "Oriental Sadness" had previously been issued in the U.S. on the Hollies' album Beat Group! earlier in 1966.

Bus Stop was also the fourth Canadian album by The Hollies, released on Capitol Records in mono and stereo ((S)T-6195) on November 7, 1966. Unlike its American counterpart, it did not include any material from before the 1965 recording sessions for the Hollies album. Instead, the album combined the current single with generally unissued tracks from the UK albums Hollies and Would You Believe?. Three songs ("Oriental Sadness", "That's How Strong My Love Is" and "I Take What I Want") had previously been issued in Canada on the Hollies' album I Can't Let Go / Look Through Any Window earlier in 1966.

This was the Hollies' last album to feature original bassist Eric Haydock, who left the group early in 1966 following disputes with the group's managers, missing the recording session for "Bus Stop"; he was eventually replaced by Bernie Calvert.

== Background ==
All of the material except the current single ("Bus Stop"/"Don't Run and Hide") featured Eric Haydock on bass. The A-side of the single, also the album's title track, featured "fill-in" bassist Bernie Calvert, who later replaced Haydock in the Hollies. One song ("Little Lover"), recorded in 1963, featured original Hollies drummer Don Rathbone instead of Bobby Elliott, and two other songs "Candy Man" and "Baby That's All" came from the UK version of the group's first album, Stay with The Hollies.

This was the last Hollies album in the U.S. or Canada on which songs composed by Allan Clarke, Tony Hicks and Graham Nash would be credited to "L. Ransford". In addition, one 1964 song included on the U.S. album is credited to another Clarke-Hicks-Nash pseudonym, "Chester Mann" (an inversion of Manchester, where the band was from).

== Track listing ==
Side one
No.	Title	Writer(s)	Lead vocals	Length
1.	"Bus Stop"	Graham Gouldman	Clarke	2:53
2.	"Candy Man"	Neil-Ross	Clarke	2:28
3.	"Baby That's All"	Chester Mann	Clarke, Nash and Hicks	2:18
4.	"I Am a Rock"	Paul Simon	Clarke	2:53
5.	"Sweet Little Sixteen"	Chuck Berry	Clarke	2:23
6.	"We're Through"	L. Ransford	Clarke	2:15

Side two
No.	Title	Writer(s)	Lead vocals	Length
7.	"Don't Run and Hide"	L. Ransford	Clarke	2:35
8.	"Oriental Sadness"	L. Ransford	Clarke and Nash	2:38
9.	"Mickey's Monkey"	Holland-Dozier-Holland	Clarke	2:30
10.	"Little Lover"	Clarke-Nash	Clarke	2:00
11.	"You Know He Did"	L. Ransford	Clarke	2:02
12.	"What'cha Gonna Do About It?"	Carroll-Payne	Clarke	2:17

=== Canadian track listing ===
Side one
No.	Title	Writer(s)	Lead vocals	Length
1.	"Bus Stop"	Graham Gouldman	Clarke	2:51
2.	"I Take What I Want"	Porter-Hodges-Hayes	Clarke	2:15
3.	"That's How Strong My Love Is"	Roosevelt Jamison	Clarke	2:42
4.	"Sweet Little Sixteen"	Chuck Berry	Clarke	2:21
5.	"Oriental Sadness"	L. Ransford	Clarke and Nash	2:37
6.	"I Am a Rock"	Paul Simon	Clarke	2:48

Side two
No.	Title	Writer(s)	Lead vocals	Length
7.	"Don't Run and Hide"	L. Ransford	Clarke	2:33
8.	"I've Got a Way of My Own"	L. Ransford	Clarke and Nash	2:12
9.	"Don't You Even Care (What's Gonna Happen to Me)"	Clint Ballard, Jr.	Clarke	2:27
10.	"Very Last Day"	Paul Stookey-Peter Yarrow	Clarke	2:58
11.	"Too Many People"	L. Ransford	Clarke	2:38

== Personnel ==
The Hollies

- Allan Clarke − vocals, harmonica
- Tony Hicks – lead guitar, vocals
- Graham Nash – rhythm guitar, vocals
- Bobby Elliott – drums except on "Little Lover"
- Don Rathbone – drums on "Little Lover"
- Eric Haydock – bass guitar except on "Don't Run and Hide" and "Bus Stop"
- Bernie Calvert – bass guitar on "Bus Stop"

Additional personnel

- Ron Richards – production
- John Paul Jones – bass guitar on "Don't Run and Hide"
