= For Certain Because =

1966 studio album by The Hollies

Studio album by the Hollies
- Released: 9 December 1966
- Recorded: 17 November 1965 – 17 October 1966
- Studio: EMI, London
- Genre: Rock; pop; folk rock
- Length: 32:24
- Label: Parlophone
- Producer: Ron Richards

The Hollies chronology
Would You Believe? (1966)	For Certain Because (1966)	Evolution (1967)

Professional ratings
Review scores
Source	Rating
AllMusic	3.5/5 stars
The Encyclopedia of Popular Music	4/5 stars

For Certain Because is the fifth UK album by the Hollies and their second released in 1966. It was the first Hollies album in which all the songs were written by members Allan Clarke, Graham Nash, and Tony Hicks, and the first on which they did not use the songwriting pseudonym "L. Ransford" (or just "Ransford"). It was also the first Hollies album recorded with new bassist Bernie Calvert replacing Eric Haydock. In Bobby Elliott's book It Ain't Heavy, It's My Story, he explains how he came up with the title For Certain Because by taking the three words from the children's song "Teddy Bears' Picnic".

Most current CD releases of this album use the original UK album title and artwork, but a recent US CD reissue series instead uses the US title and artwork, described below.

== Composition ==
Writing for AllMusic, critic Richie Unterberger sees For Certain Because as echoing the rapidly increasing sophistication in pop music throughout 1966, pointing out the album's "fuller, more adventurous arrangements and more personal, folk-rock-influenced compositions." According to author Brian Southall, the album is considered by some to be the Hollies' answer to the Beatles' Rubber Soul, released in December 1965. In a contemporary review, Keith Altham of New Musical Express noted the album's overall style as regularly crossing between varying genres, such as Dixieland, Latin-American music, orchestral music, and folk.

== US/Canadian version (Stop! Stop! Stop!) ==
Stop! Stop! Stop!

Studio album by the Hollies
- Released: January 1967
- Genre: Rock; pop; folk rock
- Length: 32:31
- Label: Imperial (US); Capitol (Canada)
- Producer: Ron Richards

The Hollies chronology
Bus Stop (1966)	Stop! Stop! Stop! (1967)	The Hollies' Greatest Hits (1967)

The Hollies Canadian chronology
Bus Stop (1966)	Stop! Stop! Stop! (1966)	The Hits of The Hollies (1967)

For Certain Because was retitled Stop! Stop! Stop! for the US and Canadian markets and issued with a different, full-color cover image of the group in the US. This was also the fifth Hollies album released in the US and Canada. It was the first Hollies album on which the track listing for the UK version remained unchanged for the US and the Canadian versions; that would not happen again until the 1970s. In addition, other markets also used the title Stop! Stop! Stop! when issuing or reissuing this album—including the UK, which retitled this album as Stop! Stop! Stop! for a 1971 budget-line reissue. In 1983, Liberty Records in the US reissued this album as Pay You Back With Interest without the tracks "Stop! Stop! Stop!" and "High Classed".

Stop! Stop! Stop! was the Hollies' last new album for Imperial Records in the US and for Capitol Records in Canada and would be followed by a greatest hits album on those labels. The Hollies' next album of originals, Evolution, would be released in the US and Canada on Epic Records while remaining on Parlophone/EMI in the UK and would revert to having a different track lineup between the US/Canadian and UK versions.

== Track listing ==
All tracks written by Allan Clarke, Tony Hicks, and Graham Nash. All lead vocals by Allan Clarke, except where indicated.

Side one
No.	Title	Lead vocals	Length
1.	"What’s Wrong with the Way I Live"		2:02
2.	"Pay You Back with Interest"	Clarke and Nash	2:46
3.	"Tell Me to My Face"	Nash	3:09
4.	"Clown"	Nash	2:16
5.	"Suspicious Look in Your Eyes"		3:37
6.	"It's You"		2:17

Side two
No.	Title	Lead vocals	Length
7.	"High Classed"		2:21
8.	"Peculiar Situation"		2:51
9.	"What Went Wrong"		2:12
10.	"Crusader"	Clarke and Nash	3:48
11.	"Don't Even Think About Changing"		2:13
12.	"Stop! Stop! Stop!"		2:58

== Personnel ==
- Allan Clarke – vocals, harmonica
- Tony Hicks – lead guitar, banjo, vocals
- Graham Nash – rhythm guitar, vocals
- Bobby Elliott – drums
- Bernie Calvert – bass guitar except on "Don't Even Think About Changing", piano
- Eric Haydock – bass guitar on "Don't Even Think About Changing"
- Mike Vickers – orchestral arrangements on "High Classed", "What Went Wrong" and "Crusader"
