= Evolution (Hollies album) =

1967 studio album by The Hollies

Studio album by the Hollies
- Released: 1 June 1967
- Recorded: 11 January – 17 March 1967
- Studio: EMI, London
- Genre: Pop; psychedelia
- Length: 32:17
- Label: Parlophone; Epic
- Producer: Ron Richards

The Hollies chronology
For Certain Because (1966)	Evolution (1967)	Butterfly (1967)

Professional ratings
Review scores
Source	Rating
AllMusic	4/5 stars
The Encyclopedia of Popular Music	4/5 stars
Sounds	4/5 stars
Uncut	6/10
The Village Voice	A−

Evolution is the sixth studio album by the English rock and pop band the Hollies, released on 1 June 1967. It peaked at number 13 on the UK Albums Chart.

In 1978, Parlophone reissued the stereo version of Evolution, along with Butterfly and Confessions of the Mind.

== Background ==
Like its predecessor, For Certain Because, this album comprises only songs written by group members Allan Clarke, Graham Nash, and Tony Hicks. None of the songs on the album were selected for single or EP release in the UK, although "Carrie Anne" from the American release was issued as a single in the US. Drummer Bobby Elliott only played on three songs on the album due to appendicitis and, as a result, he was substituted for by Dougie Wright, Clem Cattini and Mitch Mitchell of the Jimi Hendrix Experience.

The song "Have You Ever Loved Somebody?" was released earlier (in September 1966) both by the Searchers and Paul and Barry Ryan as single a-sides. It was first released by the Everly Brothers on their Two Yanks in England album.

== Recording ==
Evolution and its respective singles were recorded at EMI's Abbey Road Studios in just six days spread over three months in early 1967, at the same time the Beatles were recording Sgt. Pepper's Lonely Hearts Club Band. The first session occurred on 11 January where "When Your Lights Turned On", "Have You Ever Loved Somebody" and the B-side "All the World is Love" were completed. Work began on, but was not completed for, the eventual single "On a Carousel". That song was completed during the next session on 13 January along with the album track, "Lullaby to Tim". Two songs sung in Italian, "Non Prego Per Me" and "Devi Avere Fiducia in Me" (the former composed by Lucio Battisti and Mogol), were also recorded on that day specifically for release as a single in Italy. The next session on 22 February was dedicated to two more songs meant specifically for release in Italy, "We're Alive" and "Kill Me Quick". "The Games We Play" as well as the Graham Gouldman-penned "Schoolgirl" were also begun during this session. The bulk of album work took place on 3, 8, and 17 March. "Schoolgirl" was attempted again on the 8th but was ultimately left unfinished for reasons unknown. It was completed years later, in November 1997, by Tony Hicks (who also recorded additional guitar) and his son Paul at Abbey Road studios and released on the "Abbey Road 66-70" CD. The final songs recorded before the album's release in June were "Carrie Anne" on 1 May and its B-side, "Signs That Will Never Change", on the following day.

== Album cover ==
The album cover artwork was created by the Fool, with the psychedelic cover photo by Karl Ferris, who is credited with creating the first truly psychedelic photograph for an album cover.

Ferris commented on the making of the album cover during a special signing of cover prints in 1997:

... they wanted to break from their 'Pop Beat' sound into something more psychedelic. So I listened to the music that they were recording at Abbey Road Studios, and got an image of them pushing through a membrane into 'the Psychedelic world', and so in summer of 1966 I took a studio shot of them pushing out their hands and the lead singer pointing through clear plastic. Over this I superimposed a shot of William Morris Art Nouveau wallpaper with an illustration and 'Love' lettering drawn by my girl friend Anke. This combination created the image of the Hollies 'pushing through to a new wave of music style and consciousness'. I worked with the Fool (led by Simon Posthuma) on this, and they did the lettering, the back cover design and the group's costumes.

== Track listing ==
All tracks written by Allan Clarke, Tony Hicks, and Graham Nash.

Side one
No.	Title	Lead vocals	Length
1.	"Then the Heartaches Begin"	Clarke	2:48
2.	"Stop Right There"	Nash	2:28
3.	"Water on the Brain"	Clarke	2:27
4.	"Lullaby to Tim"	Nash	3:04
5.	"Have You Ever Loved Somebody?"	Clarke	3:04
6.	"You Need Love"	Clarke and Nash	2:32

Side two
No.	Title	Lead vocals	Length
7.	"Rain on the Window"	Clarke	3:16
8.	"Heading for a Fall"	Clarke	2:23
9.	"Ye Olde Toffee Shoppe"	Nash and Clarke	2:22
10.	"When Your Light's Turned On"	Nash and Clarke	2:37
11.	"Leave Me"	Clarke and Nash	2:30
12.	"The Games We Play"	Clarke and Nash	2:46

== US version ==
Evolution

Studio album by the Hollies
- Released: June 1967
- Recorded: 11 January – 17 March 1967 (except 1 May 1967 for "Carrie Anne")
- Studio: EMI, London
- Genre: Pop
- Length: 26:48
- Label: Epic
- Producer: Ron Richards

The Hollies US chronology
The Hollies' Greatest Hits (1967)	Evolution (1967)	Dear Eloise / King Midas in Reverse (1967)

The Hollies Canadian chronology
The Hits of The Hollies (1967)	Evolution (1967)	Love N' Flowers (1967)

Evolution was also the name of the Hollies' debut album for their new US label, Epic Records. But, like many American issues of British albums, this album was remixed using heavy echo and reverb. In addition, three songs were left off the album (with only "Carrie Anne" added).

The cover shown is the US/Canadian cover, which used the same Karl Ferris photograph but differed from the UK cover by dispensing with The Fool's overall cover design. Instead, the US/Canadian cover put the Hollies' name on the cover in different lettering, placed the album title on the cover, and then overlaid a paisley-patterned image.

The 1998 US CD reissue of Evolution by Sundazed presents the original US Epic Evolution LP using the original EMI stereo masters. In addition, two of the songs that appeared on the UK Evolution, "Water on the Brain" and "When Your Lights Turn On" appear here as well as "Jennifer Eccles," "Signs That Will Never Change", and "Open Up Your Eyes."

=== Track listing ===
All tracks are written by Allan Clarke, Tony Hicks, and Graham Nash.

Side one
No.	Title	Length
1.	"Carrie Anne"	2:54
2.	"Stop Right There"	2:23
3.	"Rain on the Window"	3:10
4.	"Then the Heartaches Begin"	2:41
5.	"Ye Olde Toffee Shop"	2:16

Side two
No.	Title	Length
6.	"You Need Love"	2:27
7.	"Heading For a Fall"	2:15
8.	"Games We Play"	2:45
9.	"Lullaby to Tim"	2:57
10.	"Have You Ever Loved Somebody?"	2:57

== Personnel ==
The Hollies

- Allan Clarke – vocals, harmonica
- Tony Hicks – lead guitar, vocals
- Graham Nash – rhythm guitar, vocals
- Bobby Elliott – drums on "When Your Light's Turned On", "Have You Ever Loved Somebody?" and "Lullaby to Tim"
- Bernie Calvert – bass guitar, harpsichord on "Ye Olde Toffee Shoppe"

Additional personnel

- Ron Richards – production
- Dougie Wright, Mitch Mitchell, Clem Cattini – drums except where noted
- Elton John – piano on "Water on the Brain" and Hammond organ on "You Need Love"

== Charts ==
Chart performance for Evolution
Chart (1967)	Peak position
Norwegian Albums (VG-lista)	3
UK Albums (OCC)	13
US Billboard 200	43
