= Vic Steele =

British guitarist (born 1945)

- Birth name: Victor Winston Farrell
- Born: 8 May 1945 (age 79); Manchester, England
- Genres: Rock, pop
- Occupation: Musician
- Instrument: Guitar
- Years active: 1961–1963

Victor Winston Farrell (born 8 May 1945), best known as Vic Steele, is a British former guitarist. He was the original lead guitarist of the Hollies.

== Career ==
Farrell was born on 8 May 1945 in Manchester, England. He played the guitar from early adolescence onward, and was inspired by American rock and roll. In 1961 he became the lead guitarist of Manchester-based group the Emperors of Rhythm, which featured Eric Stewart, later of the Mindbenders and 10cc fame, on rhythm guitar. Farrell was also close friends with Mindbenders frontman Wayne Fontana.

After the Emperors of Rhythm disbanded in the summer of 1962, Farrell decided to team up with singer Allan Clarke, singer/guitarist Graham Nash, bassist Eric Haydock and drummer Don Rathbone. The group went under several names, first calling themselves "The Hollies" for a December 1962 gig at the Oasis Club in Manchester. In 2009, Nash wrote, "We called ourselves The Hollies, after Buddy and Christmas."

In January 1963 the Hollies performed at the Cavern Club in Liverpool, where they were seen by Parlophone assistant producer Ron Richards, who had been involved in producing the first Beatles session. Richards offered the Hollies an audition with Parlophone, but Steele did not want to be a "professional" musician and left the band in April 1963. Tony Hicks was brought in to replace him.
