= I Can't Tell the Bottom from the Top =

1970 single by the Hollies

- Cover of the single released in the Netherlands

Single by The Hollies
- B-side: "Mad Professor Blyth"
- Released: 10 April 1970
- Recorded: 9–13 March 1970
- Studio: EMI Studios, London
- Genre: Pop rock
- Length: 3:50
- Label: Parlophone; Epic
- Songwriters: Guy Fletcher; Doug Flett
- Producer: Ron Richards

The Hollies singles chronology
"He Ain't Heavy, He's My Brother" (1969)	"I Can't Tell the Bottom from the Top" (1970)	"Gasoline Alley Bred" (1970)

"I Can't Tell the Bottom from the Top" is a song by rock group the Hollies, released in April 1970 as a single. It peaked at number 7 on the UK Singles Chart.

== Recording and reception ==
"I Can't Tell the Bottom from the Top" was recorded at Abbey Road Studios, from 9 to 13 March 1970. Elton John, who was working as a session musician at that time, played piano on the song.

Reviewing for Melody Maker, Chris Welch wrote that "the Hollies drone on with implacable solemnity and it's nice to hear their individual vocal harmonies again and Bobby Elliot's drumming. In Cash Box, it was described as a "slowly building ballad with more of the drama of “Reflections of My Life” than the Hollies' “He Ain't Heavy,” this new side from the team features the same kind of emotional impact that guarantees satisfaction for old and new-found Hollies followers". Record World called it " a low-key starter which builds and builds."

== Charts ==
Chart (1970)	Peak position
Belgium (Ultratop 50 Flanders)	16
Belgium (Ultratop 50 Wallonia)	44
Canada Top Singles (RPM)	48
Germany (GfK)	25
Ireland (IRMA)	8
Netherlands (Dutch Top 40)	10
Netherlands (Single Top 100)	9
New Zealand (Listener)	12
South Africa (Springbok Radio)	14
UK Singles (Official Charts)	7
US Billboard Hot 100	82
US Cash Box Top 100	64
