= Stop Stop Stop =

1966 song by the Hollies

- Swedish picture sleeve

Single by the Hollies

from the album For Certain Because
- B-side: "It's You"
- Released: 7 October 1966
- Recorded: 20 June & 17 August 1966
- Studio: EMI, London
- Genre: Pop rock, folk rock, psychedelic pop
- Length: 2:47
- Label: Parlophone (UK) Imperial Records (US)
- Songwriters: Allan Clarke, Tony Hicks, Graham Nash
- Producer: Ron Richards

The Hollies singles chronology
"After the Fox" (1966)	"Stop Stop Stop" (1966)	"On a Carousel" (1967)

"Stop Stop Stop" is a song by British pop group the Hollies that was written by group members Allan Clarke, Tony Hicks, and Graham Nash. The song was the band's first to credit Clarke, Nash and Hicks as songwriters, as all their previous original songs had been published under the collective pseudonym "L. Ransford" (or simply "Ransford"). It later appeared on the album For Certain Because in the United Kingdom.

The song was released as a single by the Parlophone label in October 1966 and was released around the same time in the United States by Imperial Records. It was the last single that The Hollies released that year, and became a worldwide hit reaching the top 10 of the singles charts in eight countries, including No. 1 in Canada. There is also an Italian version, made by Rita Pavone. The song was covered by Minneapolis Celtic-punk group Boiled in Lead on their 1989 album From the Ladle to the Grave, also interpolating a traditional Egyptian melody into the song.

== Background and recording ==
"Stop Stop Stop" is notable for being one of the few recordings by the group that feature Tony Hicks playing the banjo, and was the only song with that instrument to be performed live by the group. The banjo was played through tape delay so that it sounds like a balalaika, while the tempo was similarly influenced by Middle Eastern and Greek music, which, combined with Bobby Elliott's vehement cymbal crashes, results in what critic Richie Unterberger describes as one of the most offbeat rock songs of 1966. The song – like most others by the group – features three-part vocal harmony between Allan Clarke, Hicks, and Graham Nash. It was recorded at Abbey Road Studios in London, England, and was produced by Ron Richards.

Nash has said in various interviews that this song was inspired by the time American record executive and impresario Morris Levy took him and the rest of the band to a strip club. They had never previously been to one, for there was none in their home city of Manchester.

"Stop Stop Stop" is similar to the song "Come On Back", also written by Clarke–Hicks–Nash, which was released as the B-side of "We're Through" in September 1964.

== Reception ==
The reception given to the song in North America was so strong that the group's record labels in the United States (Imperial) and Canada (Capitol) put out the studio album originally released in the United Kingdom as For Certain Because, retitled as Stop! Stop! Stop!.

Cash Box said that it is a "wild tongue-in-cheeker [that] is the tale of a belly dancer couched in a middle eastern mode, with loads of appeal".

=== Charts ===
Chart (1966)	Peak position
Australia (Go-Set)	11
Canadian Top Singles	1
Finland (Soumen Virallinen)	9
Netherlands (Single Top 100)	5
New Zealand (Listener)	1
Norway (VG-lista)	4
Sweden (Kvällstoppen)	4
UK Singles (Official Charts)	2
US Billboard Hot 100	7
West Germany (GfK)	4
