= He Ain't Heavy, He's My Brother =

1969 single by Kelly Gordon

Single by Kelly Gordon

from the album Defunked
- B-side: "That's Life"
- Released: March 15, 1969
- Length: 4:49
- Label: Capitol
- Songwriters: Bob Russell; Bobby Scott
- Producer: Kelly Gordon

Kelly Gordon singles chronology
"You're A Star Now" (1964)	"He Ain't Heavy, He's My Brother" (1969)	"Some Old Funky Blues Thing" (1969)

"He Ain't Heavy, He's My Brother" is a ballad written by Bobby Scott and Bob Russell. Originally recorded by Kelly Gordon in 1969, the song became a worldwide hit for the Hollies later that year and also a hit for Neil Diamond in 1970. It has been recorded by many artists in subsequent years. The Hollies' version was re-released in 1988 and again was a major hit in the UK, going on to reach number one.

Scott and Russell were introduced to each other by Johnny Mercer, at a California nightclub. Although Russell was dying of lymphoma and the pair met only three times, they managed to collaborate on the song.

== Title ==
In his 1884 book The Parables of Jesus, James Wells, Moderator of the United Free Church of Scotland, tells the story of a little girl carrying a big baby boy. Seeing her struggling, someone asked if she wasn't tired. With surprise she replied: "No, he's not heavy; he's my brother."

In a 1918 publication by Ralph Waldo Trine titled The Higher Powers of Mind and Spirit, Trine relates the following anecdote: "Do you know that incident in connection with the little Scottish girl? She was trudging along, carrying as best she could a boy younger, but it seemed almost as big as she herself, when one remarked to her how heavy he must be for her to carry, when instantly came the reply: 'He's na heavy. He's mi brither.'"

The first editor of Kiwanis magazine, Roe Fulkerson, published a column in September 1924 carrying the title "He Ain't Heavy, He's My Brother", the first use of the phrase exactly as it is rendered in the song title.

In the 1940s, the words, adapted as "He ain't heavy, Father, he's my brother", were taken as a slogan for Boys Town children's home by founder Father Edward Flanagan. According to the Boys Town website, the phrase as used by Boys Town was said to Fr. Flanagan in 1918 by one of the residents while carrying another up a set of stairs. The boy being carried is said to have had polio and worn leg braces.

== The Hollies version ==
"He Ain't Heavy, He's My Brother"

Single by the Hollies

from the album He Ain't Heavy, He's My Brother (US)
- B-side: "'Cos You Like to Love Me"
- Released: September 26, 1969
- Recorded: June 25, 1969
- Studio: EMI, London
- Genre: Baroque pop; soft rock; gospel
- Length: 4:20
- Label: Parlophone; Epic
- Songwriters: Bob Russell; Bobby Scott
- Producer: Ron Richards

The Hollies singles chronology
"Sorry Suzanne" (1969)	"He Ain't Heavy, He's My Brother" (1969)	"I Can't Tell the Bottom from the Top" (1970)

The Hollies recorded the song in May 1969 at the EMI Studios (now Abbey Road Studios), with Allan Clarke on lead vocals. According to Tony Hicks, he was given a demo recorded by Bobby Scott and Bob Russell when he was looking for songs to record, but found it too slow. The band sped up the song, and added an orchestra when they recorded the song. Elton John, who was working as a session musician at the time, played piano on the song, as well their next single, "I Can't Tell the Bottom from the Top". Elton John was paid £12 for his work on the song.

The song was released on 26 September 1969 and reached No. 3 in the UK, and No. 7 in the US. The song was re-released in June 1988 in the UK following its use in a television advertisement for Miller Lite beer. It reached the No. 1 spot in the UK chart for two weeks in September 1988.

Record World said, "This beautiful ballad features [the Hollies'] usual fine vocals."

Weekly charts

Chart (1969–1970)	Peak position
Australia (KMR)	8
Austria (Ö3 Austria Top 40)	16
Canadian Top Singles	11
Canadian Adult Singles	35
Finland (Suomen Virallinen)	16
Ireland (Irish Singles Chart)	3
Netherlands (Single Top 100)	15
New Zealand (Listener)	7
Norway (VG-lista)	7
South Africa (Springbok)	1
Switzerland (Schweizer Hitparade)	5
UK Singles (Official Charts)	3
US Billboard Hot 100	7
US Cash Box Top 100	8
West Germany (GfK)	9

Chart (1988)	Peak position
Europe (Eurochart Hot 100)	6
Ireland (Irish Singles Chart)	2
UK Singles (Official Charts)	1

Year-end charts

Chart (1970)	Rank
Australia	54
Canada	68
South Africa	16
US Billboard Hot 100	46
US Cash Box	58

Chart (1988)	Rank
Europe (Eurochart Hot 100)	95
UK Singles (OCC)	8

Certifications

Region	Certification	Certified units/sales
New Zealand (RMNZ)	Platinum	30,000^{‡}
United Kingdom (BPI)	Gold	400,000^{‡}
^{‡} Sales+streaming figures based on certification alone.

== Neil Diamond version ==
"He Ain't Heavy, He's My Brother"

Single by Neil Diamond

from the album Tap Root Manuscript
- B-side: "Free Life"
- Released: November 5, 1970
- Recorded: 1970
- Genre: Rock
- Length: 4:09
- Label: Uni
- Songwriters: Bob Russell, Bobby Scott
- Producers: Neil Diamond, Tom Catalano

Neil Diamond singles chronology
"Cracklin' Rosie" (1970)	"He Ain't Heavy, He's My Brother" (1970)	"Do It" (1970)

The Neil Diamond version entered at No. 68 on the Hot 100 on November 7, 1970 (UNI Records, 55264, length 4:09). The flip side was "Free Life". The song appears on Diamond's album Tap Root Manuscript, which was released in November 1970. The song was played by KGB-AM radio, San Diego, California, in late 1970, prior to the then-new Walk for Mankind, in dedication to those who would be walking for donations that day.

Track listings

7" single

1. He Ain't Heavy - He's My Brother - 3:59
2. Free Life - 3:11

Charts

Chart (1970–1971)	Peak position
Canada RPM Top 100	4
Canada RPM AC	9
US Billboard Hot 100	20
US Adult Contemporary (Billboard)	4
Australian Singles Chart	94
New Zealand (Listener)	18

== Bill Medley version ==
"He Ain't Heavy, He's My Brother"

Single by Bill Medley

from the album Rambo III: Original Motion Picture Soundtrack
- Released: August 1, 1988
- Recorded: 1988
- Genre: Soul, adult contemporary
- Length: 4:30
- Label: Scotti Bros
- Songwriters: Bob Russell, Bobby Scott
- Producer: Giorgio Moroder

Bill Medley singles chronology
"(I've Had) The Time of My Life" (1987)	"He Ain't Heavy, He's My Brother" (1988)	"I'm Gonna Be Strong" (1989)

Bill Medley recorded a version for the soundtrack of the film Rambo III. It was released as a single in the UK and peaked at No. 25, being on the chart the same time as the Hollies' version in 1988. It reached No. 49 on Billboard's AC chart.

Track listings

7" single

1. He Ain't Heavy, He's My Brother - 4:30
2. Giorgio Moroder – The Bridge (Instrumental) - 4:00

Charts

Chart (1988)	Peak position
US Adult Contemporary (Billboard)	49
UK Singles Chart	25
Dutch Top 40	23
Belgian Singles Chart	20

== Gotthard version ==
"He Ain't Heavy, He's My Brother"
- Cover art for the single with alternate title.

Single by Gotthard

from the album G. (Asian Releases only)
- Released: September 20, 1996
- Recorded: 1996
- Genre: Pop
- Length: 4:37
- Label: BMG
- Songwriters: Bob Russell, Bobby Scott
- Producer: Chris von Rohr

Gotthard singles chronology
"One Life One Soul" (1996)	"He Ain't Heavy, He's My Brother" (1996)	"Let It Rain" (1996)

In 1996, Gotthard released their version of the song, which was poppier compared to their other songs, and the structure was retained as a ballad like the original. In Switzerland, the cover was just as successful as the original. The Asian version of the album G contains the cover. It also appears on the compilation albums One Life One Soul – Best of Ballads and The Greatest Rock Ballads.

Track listings

CD-maxi

1. "He Ain't Heavy, He's My Brother" - 4:37
2. "All I Care For" - 3:08
3. "One Life, One Soul" - 3:58

Charts

Chart (1996)	Peak position
Swiss Singles Chart	10

== The Justice Collective version ==
"He Ain't Heavy, He's My Brother"

Single by the Justice Collective
- Released: December 17, 2012
- Recorded: October–November 2012
- Studio: Sleeper Studios, Metropolis Studios, Abbey Road Studios (London); Parr Street Studios, Liverpool Institute for Performing Arts (Liverpool)
- Genre: Rock, pop rock
- Length: 4:33
- Label: Metropolis
- Songwriters: Bob Russell; Bobby Scott
- Producers: Guy Chambers; Richard Flack

The Justice Collective singles chronology
"The Fields of Anfield Road (as the Liverpool Collective)" (2009)	"He Ain't Heavy, He's My Brother" (2012)	"All Together Now (as the Peace Collective)" (2014)

Music video
- "He Ain't Heavy, He's My Brother" on YouTube

In 2012, a version of the song was recorded, and was released on December 17, 2012, by musicians and celebrities going under the name the Justice Collective, for various charities associated with the Hillsborough disaster. The song went on to take the coveted Christmas number one position for 2012 on the UK Singles Chart.

Background

After the News International phone hacking scandal, members of the Farm along with Pete Wylie, and Mick Jones of the Clash performed at an anti-The Sun concert at the Liverpool Olympia in September 2011. Following this they formed the Justice Tonight Band and toured the United Kingdom and Europe for the next year in order to raise awareness of the Hillsborough Justice Campaign.

Initially, the idea was to re-release the 2009 single "The Fields of Anfield Road" by the Liverpool Collective featuring the Kop Choir; however, this idea was rejected by Peter Hooton as only a relatively small number of people would buy it. Inspired by Everton's Hillsborough tribute on September 17, 2012, the song was played at Goodison Park prior to their match against Newcastle United. It was then decided that a re-recording of "He Ain't Heavy, He's My Brother" by various artists including the Justice Tonight Band would be released as the charity single.

Keith Mullen of the Farm recruited Guy Chambers to produce the single and with Chambers offering free use of his Sleeper Studios to record the song. On October 25, 2012, Steve Rotheram, Guy Chambers and Kenny Dalglish announced plans for the single to be recorded by various artists such as Robbie Williams, Rebecca Ferguson, Paloma Faith, Beverley Knight, Melanie C, Holly Johnson, Mick Jones, Glen Campbell, Peter Hooton, Chris Sharrock, Glenn Tilbrook, Ren Harvieu, Dave McCabe, Paul Heaton, Hollie Cook, Jon McClure, John Power, Gerry Marsden, and two original members of the Hollies, Bobby Elliott and Tony Hicks.

Vocalists

- Andy Brown (Lawson)
- Gerry Marsden (Gerry and the Pacemakers)
- Paul Heaton (The Beautiful South)
- Glenn Tilbrook (Squeeze)
- John Power (Cast, The La's)
- Robbie Williams (Take That)
- Melanie C (Spice Girls)
- Rebecca Ferguson
- Holly Johnson (Frankie Goes to Hollywood)
- Beverley Knight
- Paloma Faith
- Eliza Doolittle
- Dave McCabe (The Zutons)
- Peter Hooton (The Farm)
- Ren Harvieu
- Jon McClure (Reverend and the Makers)
- Paul McCartney (The Beatles)
- Shane MacGowan (The Pogues)
- Hollie Cook (The Slits)
- Bobby Elliott (The Hollies)
- Tony Hicks (The Hollies)
- LIPA Gospel Choir
- Clay Crosse
- Alan Hansen
- Peter Reid
- John Bishop
- Kenny Dalglish
- Neil Fitzmaurice

Musicians

- Chris Sharrock (Beady Eye, The La's) – drums
- David Catlin-Birch (The Bootleg Beatles, World Party) – bass
- Paul McCartney – lead guitar
- Mick Jones (The Clash) – electric guitar
- Andrew "Davo" Davitt – acoustic guitar
- Guy Chambers – piano
- Will Pound – harmonica
- Liverpool Philharmonic Orchestra – strings
- Richard Blake – trumpet/flugelhorn
- Matthew Lewis – trombone/euphonium
- Meredith Moore – French horn
- Will Roberts – tuba

Production

- Guy Chambers – producer
- Richard Flack – producer, engineer
- Oliver Som – engineer
- Liam Nolan – engineer
- Chris Taylor – engineer
- Jon Withnall – engineer
- Tony Draper – engineer
- Alec Brits – engineer

Weekly charts

Chart (2012)	Peak position
Ireland (IRMA)	4
Netherlands (Single Top 100)	36
Norway (VG-lista)	17
Scottish Singles Sales (Official Charts)	2
Spain (Airplay Chart)	33
UK Singles (Official Charts)	1
UK Indie (Official Charts)	1

Year-end charts

Chart (2012)	Rank
UK Singles (OCC)	49
