= The Hollies =

English rock and pop band (1962–2026)

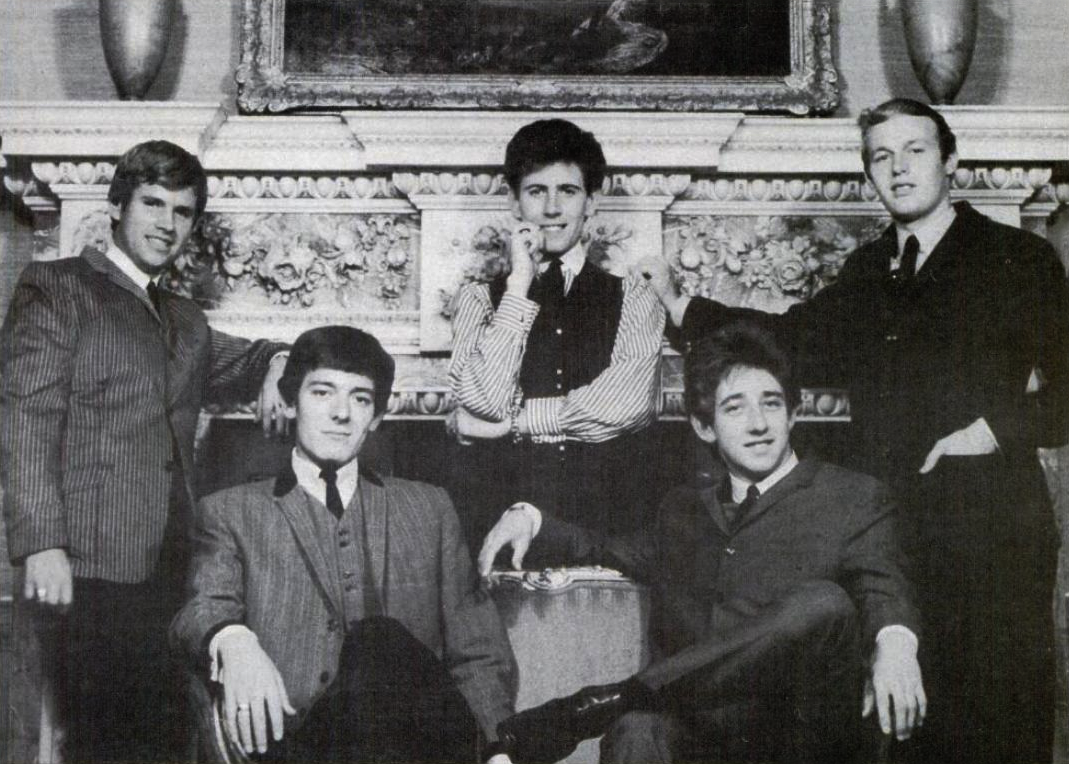
- The Hollies in 1964; from left: Eric Haydock, Allan Clarke, Graham Nash, Tony Hicks, Bobby Elliott.

Background information
- Origin: Manchester, Lancashire, England
- Genres: Rock; pop; gospel; beat
- Years active: 1962–2026
- Labels: Parlophone; Imperial; Epic; Polydor; Hansa; WEA; RCA; EMI; Capitol
- Spinoffs: Crosby, Stills, Nash & Young
- Past members: Allan Clarke; Graham Nash; Eric Haydock; Don Rathbone; Vic Steele; Tony Hicks; Bobby Elliott; Bernie Calvert; Terry Sylvester; Mikael Rickfors; Alan Coates; Steve Stroud; Denis Haines; Ray Stiles; Dave Carey; Ian Parker; Carl Wayne; Peter Howarth; Steve Lauri
- Website: hollies.co.uk

The Hollies were an English pop band formed in Salford in 1962 by singer Allan Clarke and rhythm guitarist/singer Graham Nash. One of the most successful British bands of the mid-1960s to early 1970s, their first stable line-up consisted of Clarke, Nash, lead guitarist Tony Hicks, bassist Eric Haydock, and drummer Don Rathbone. Rathbone was replaced by Bobby Elliott in late 1963, while Haydock was replaced by Bernie Calvert in mid-1966. During the Hollies' early years, most of their original songs were written by the trio of Clarke/Hicks/Nash, until Nash left the group in late 1968 to co-form Crosby, Stills & Nash, and was replaced by Terry Sylvester. Apart from a short time during late 1971 to early 1973 (during which Clarke was replaced by Mikael Rickfors), the Clarke/Hicks/Elliott/Calvert/Sylvester line-up remained in place until Calvert and Sylvester both departed in 1981. Over the next 23 years, the band underwent several more personnel changes, including a brief return of Nash during the 1980s and the final departure of Clarke in 2000, before stabilising in 2004 with their last line-up of Hicks, Elliott, singer Peter Howarth, rhythm guitarist Steve Lauri, bassist Ray Stiles, and keyboardist Ian Parker.

The Hollies enjoyed considerable popularity in the UK and Europe during the mid-1960s with a string of hits that included "Searchin'", "Stay" (both 1963), "Just One Look", "Here I Go Again", "We're Through" (all 1964), "Yes I Will", their first UK number one "I'm Alive", "Look Through Any Window", "If I Needed Someone" (all 1965) and "I Can't Let Go" (1966), although they did not achieve US chart success until "Bus Stop" was released in 1966. The group went on to have periodic success on both sides of the Atlantic Ocean over the next decade, with further UK and/or US hits including "Stop Stop Stop" (1966), "On a Carousel", "Pay You Back with Interest", "Carrie Anne", "King Midas in Reverse" (all 1967), "Dear Eloise", "Jennifer Eccles", "Listen to Me" (all 1968), "Sorry Suzanne", "He Ain't Heavy, He's My Brother" (both 1969), "I Can't Tell the Bottom from the Top", "Gasoline Alley Bred" (both 1970), "Hey Willy" (1971), "Long Cool Woman in a Black Dress", "Long Dark Road" (both 1972), "The Day That Curly Billy Shot Down Crazy Sam McGee" (1973), and "The Air That I Breathe" (1974). "He Ain't Heavy" reached number one on the UK Singles Chart following a 1988 re-release. Overall, the Hollies had over 30 charting singles on the UK Singles Chart, and 22 on the US Billboard Hot 100.

The Hollies retired from touring following Hicks and Elliott's retirement from touring in 2026. They were one of the few UK groups of the early 1960s, along with the Rolling Stones, who had never disbanded. In recognition of their achievements, the Hollies were inducted into the Rock and Roll Hall of Fame in 2010.

== Origin ==
The Hollies originated as a duo formed by Allan Clarke and Graham Nash, who were best friends from primary school and began performing together during the skiffle craze of the late 1950s. Eventually, Clarke and Nash became a vocal-and-guitar duo modelled on American duo the Everly Brothers, working as "Ricky and Dane Young"; under this name they teamed up with a local band, the Fourtones, consisting of Pete Bocking on guitar, John "Butch" Mepham on bass, Keith Bates on drums, and Derek Quinn on guitar. When Quinn quit to join Freddie and the Dreamers in 1962, Clarke and Nash also quit and joined another Manchester band, the Deltas, consisting of Vic Steele on lead guitar, Eric Haydock on bass guitar, and Don Rathbone on drums, which had just lost two members, including Eric Stewart, who left to join a "professional" band, the Mindbenders and guitarist and vocalist Rhys Watson. During these periods, the group were managed and promoted by Michael Cohen, a music enthusiast and clothing retailer from Oldham.

The Deltas first called themselves the Hollies for a December 1962 gig at the Oasis Club in Manchester. Eric Haydock was suggested to have named the group in relation to a Christmas holly garland, though in a 2009 interview, Graham Nash said that the group decided just prior to a performance to call themselves the Hollies because of their admiration for Buddy Holly. In 2009, Nash wrote, "We called ourselves the Hollies, after Buddy and Christmas."

== 1963–1969 ==
In January 1963, the Hollies performed at the Cavern Club in Liverpool, where they were seen by Parlophone assistant producer Ron Richards, who had been involved in producing the first Beatles session. Richards offered them an audition with Parlophone, but Steele did not want to be a "professional" musician and left the band in April 1963. For the audition, they brought in Tony Hicks to replace the departing Steele. Hicks played in a Nelson band called the Dolphins, which also featured Bobby Elliott on drums and Bernie Calvert on bass. Not only were the Hollies signed by Richards, who continued to produce the band until 1976 and once more in 1979, but also a song from the audition, a cover of the Coasters' 1961 single "(Ain't That) Just Like Me", was released as their debut single in May 1963 and hit number 25 on the UK Singles Chart.

Their second single, another Coasters cover, this time 1957's "Searchin'", hit number 12. At this point, after recording only eight songs for Parlophone, Rathbone also decided to leave the band, and Hicks was able to arrange for his Dolphins bandmate Bobby Elliott to replace him as the Hollies' new drummer in August 1963. They then scored their first British top-10 hit in early 1964 with a cover of Maurice Williams and the Zodiacs' "Stay", which reached number eight in the UK. It was lifted from the band's Parlophone debut album, Stay with the Hollies, released in January 1964, which went to number two on the UK album chart.

The Hollies became known for making cover versions, and they followed up with "Just One Look" (February 1964, UK number two), a song that had already had top-10 success in the US for soul star Doris Troy. The hits continued with "Here I Go Again" (May 1964, UK number four). At this point, some interest in the group arose in North America, and versions of Stay with the Hollies, with these two singles added, were issued in both Canada (by Capitol Records) and the US (by Imperial Records), with the title changed to Here I Go Again. Like their Parlophone labelmates the Beatles, the Hollies' albums released in North America were different from their UK counterparts.

By this time, the Hollies were writing and performing a substantial amount of original material, written by the group's songwriting team of Clarke, Nash, and Hicks, and producer Richards finally permitted the group to release its first self-penned hit, "We're Through" (September 1964, UKnumber seven) (credited to a pseudonym, "L. Ransford", the name of Graham Nash's grandfather, as were all their early compositions). This was followed by two more cover versions, "Yes I Will" (January 1965, UK number 9) and finally the Clint Ballard Jr.-penned "I'm Alive" (May 1965, the band's first UK number one, US number 103, Canada number 11). Their second album, In the Hollies Style (1964), did not feature in the Record Retailer top-10 album chart, although it did reach the top 10 of the New Musical Express chart. None of the tracks from the album was released in the US, although a version of it was released in Canada, with the addition of the British singles.

Finally, the Hollies broke through in North America with an original song that they requested from Manchester's Graham Gouldman. "Look Through Any Window" (September 1965, UK number four) broke the Hollies into the US top 40 (number 32, January 1966) and into the Canadian top 10 (number three in January 1966), both for the first time. Their follow-up single, an original recording of George Harrison's new song "If I Needed Someone" (December 1965), was undercut when the Beatles decided to release their own version on the UK album Rubber Soul; it only reached number 20 in the UK and was not released in North America. Their third album, simply called Hollies, hit number eight in the UK in 1965, but under the name Hear! Here!, it failed to chart in the US despite its inclusion of "Look Through Any Window" and "I'm Alive".

Of the 12 tracks on this album, only "So Lonely" was issued on a 45 in Great Britain; even then, it was the B-side to the 1965 hit "Look Through Any Window", a song recorded concurrent with the rest of this album. On the original album, only five of the 12 songs are band originals, attributed at the time to the pseudonym "L. Ransford" but actually written by Allan Clarke, Tony Hicks, and Graham Nash. The rest were covers.

In Scandinavia, the gospel song "Very Last Day" and "Too Many People" were issued as 45s, with the former becoming a major hit in Sweden. "Very Last Day" was a Christian/gospel song first released by Peter, Paul, and Mary, dealing with the Christian concept of judgement day and the equality all mankind will feel when facing it, and the topic aligned well with the cultural climate at the time. Due to the success of "Very Last Day" in Sweden, they made numerous performances (including Top of the Pops) that aired around the same time, to promote it, and it has been categorized as one of their greatest hits.

The song "Put Yourself in My Place" (written by Clarke, Hicks, and Nash) was also recorded by Episode Six and became their 1966 debut single.

The Hollies then returned to the UK top 10 with "I Can't Let Go" (February 1966, UK number two, US number 42). Their fourth album, Would You Believe?, which included the hit, made it to number 16 in 1966. Released in the US as Beat Group!, it also failed to crack the US top 100.

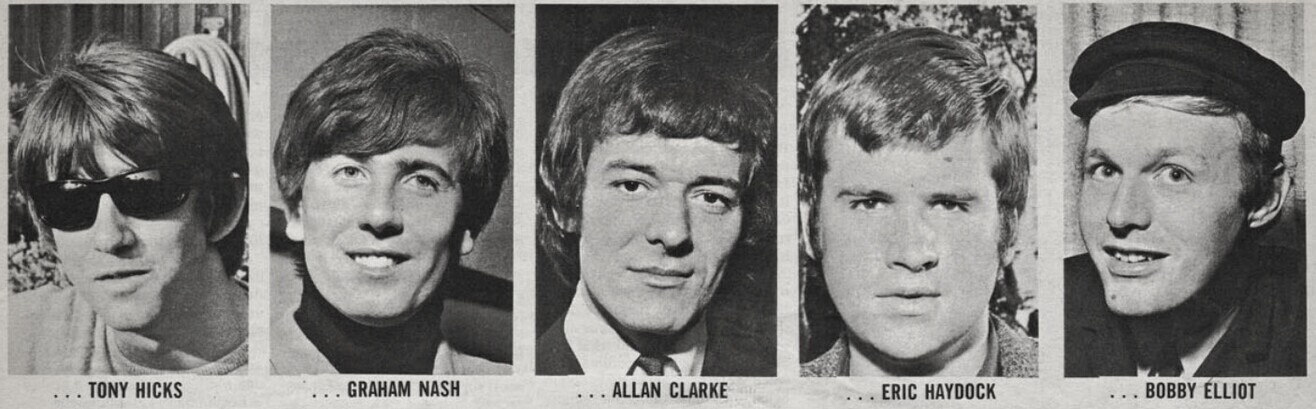
The Hollies featured in the 28 May 1966 issue of KRLA Beat.

At this point, a dispute between the Hollies and their management broke out over what bass guitarist Eric Haydock contended were excessive fees being charged to the group by management. As a result, Haydock decided to take a leave of absence from the group. While he was gone, the group brought in the Beatles' good friend Klaus Voormann to play on a few gigs and recorded two singles with fill-ins on bass: the Burt Bacharach-Hal David song "After the Fox" (September 1966), which featured Peter Sellers on vocals, Jack Bruce on electric bass, and Burt Bacharach himself on keyboards, and was the theme song from the Sellers film of the same name (which failed to chart), and "Bus Stop" (UK and US number five, June 1966), another Gouldman song, which featured Bernie Calvert, a former bandmate of Hicks and Elliott's in the Dolphins, on bass. Calvert also played a tour of Yugoslavia with the band in May 1966.

"Bus Stop" gave the Hollies their first US top-10 single. As a result, a US/Canadian Bus Stop album, made of the single mixed with unreleased songs from earlier in the band's career, climbed to number 75—the group's first album to enter the US top 100. Although Haydock ultimately proved to be correct about the fee dispute, he was sacked in early July 1966 in favour of Calvert after "Bus Stop" became a huge hit.

At the time of Haydock's departure, Clarke, Nash, and Hicks participated (along with session guitarist Jimmy Page, bass guitarist John Paul Jones, and pianist Elton John) in the recording of the Everly Brothers' 1966 album Two Yanks in England, which consisted largely of covers of "L. Ransford" compositions. After the Everly Brothers album, the Hollies stopped publishing original songs under a pseudonym, and from this point until Nash's last single with the Hollies in 1968, all of their single A-sides were original compositions, except the final Nash-era single "Listen To Me" (1968), which was written by Tony Hazzard.

In October 1966, the group's fifth album, For Certain Because (UK number 23), became their first album consisting entirely of original compositions by Clarke, Nash, and Hicks. Released in the US as Stop! Stop! Stop!, it reached number 91 there and spawned a US-release-only single, "Pay You Back with Interest", which was a modest hit, peaking at number 28. Another track, "Tell Me to My Face", was a moderate hit by Mercury artist Keith and was also covered a decade later by Dan Fogelberg and Tim Weisberg on their Twin Sons of Different Mothers album.

Meanwhile, the Hollies continued to release a steady stream of international hit singles: "Stop Stop Stop" (October 1966, UK number two, US number seven) from For Certain Because, known for its distinctive banjo arrangement; "On a Carousel" (February 1967; UK number four, US number 11, Australia number 14); "Carrie Anne" (May 1967, UK number three, US number 9, Australia number seven).).

In mid-February 1967, Bobby Elliott collapsed on stage due to an inflamed appendix. The Hollies were forced to continue their touring commitments without him, using Tony Mansfield, Dougie Wright, and Tony Newman as stand-ins for further live dates, and Wright, Mitch Mitchell, and Clem Cattini when they began recording for their next album, Evolution, which was released on 1 June 1967, the same day as the Beatles' Sgt. Pepper's Lonely Hearts Club Band. It was also their first album for their new US label Epic, and reached number 13 in the UK and number 43 in the US. The US version included the single "Carrie Anne". In addition, the Searchers and Paul and Barry Ryan each had a minor UK chart hit covering the Evolution song "Have You Ever Loved Somebody" in 1967.

Also in 1967, the Hollies participated in the Festival di San Remo with the song "Non prego per me", written by Italian songwriter Lucio Battisti and Italian lyricist Mogol.

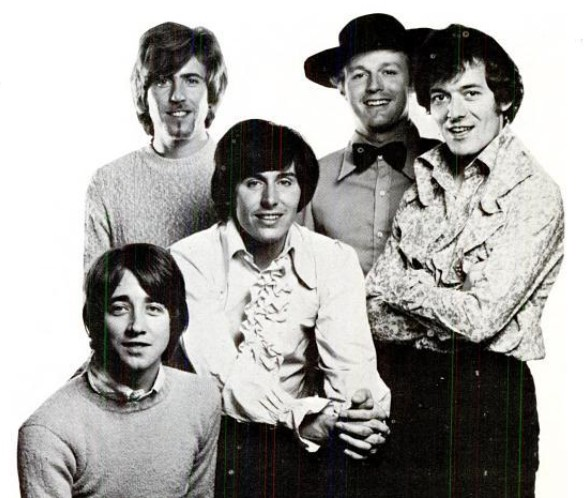
The Hollies in 1968; clockwise from top left: Graham Nash, Bobby Elliott, Allan Clarke, Bernie Calvert, Tony Hicks.

Nash's attempt to expand the band's range with a more ambitious composition, "King Midas in Reverse" (September 1967), only reached number 18 in the UK charts. The Hollies then released the ambitious, psychedelic album Butterfly (November 1967), retitled for the US market as King Midas in Reverse/Dear Eloise, but it failed to chart. In response, Clarke and Nash wrote a more conventional pop song, "Jennifer Eccles" (named after a combination of Clarke's wife, Jennifer Bowstead, and Nash's wife, Rose Eccles) (March 1968, UK number seven, US number 40, Australia number 13), which was a hit. The Hollies donated a Clarke-Nash song, "Wings", to No One's Gonna Change Our World, a charity album in aid of the World Wildlife Fund, in 1969.

In addition to his Hollies work, Graham Nash co-wrote John Walker's first solo hit "Annabella" in 1967, and the following year sang on the Scaffold's UK chart-topper "Lily the Pink" (which referenced "Jennifer Eccles"). The failure of "King Midas in Reverse" had increased tension within the band, with Clarke and Hicks wanting to record more "pop" material than Nash did. Matters reached a head when the band rejected Nash's "Marrakesh Express" and then decided to record an album made up entirely of Bob Dylan covers. Nash did take part in one Dylan cover, "Blowin' in the Wind", but made no secret of his disdain for the idea, feeling that the Hollies had proved themselves as songwriters and should be concentrating on recording original material. Nash repeatedly clashed with producer Ron Richards, who favoured the covers album.

In August 1968, the Hollies recorded "Listen to Me" (written by Tony Hazzard) (September 1968, UK No. 11), which featured Nicky Hopkins on piano. That proved to be Nash's last recording session with the Hollies; he officially left the group to move to Los Angeles, where he tentatively planned to become primarily a songwriter, after a performance in a charity concert at the London Palladium on 8 December 1968. Nash told Disc magazine, "I can't take touring any more. I just want to sit at home and write songs. I don't really care what the rest of the group think." After relocating to Los Angeles, he joined with former Buffalo Springfield guitarist Stephen Stills and ex-Byrds singer and guitarist David Crosby to form one of the first supergroups, Crosby, Stills & Nash, which released "Marrakesh Express" as its debut single.

The B-side of "Listen to Me" was "Do the Best You Can", the last original recording of a Clarke-Hicks-Nash song to appear on a Hollies record (although "Survival of the Fittest", written by Clarke-Hicks-Nash, was re-cut with Terry Sylvester and issued as a US single in 1970).

Graham Nash was replaced in the Hollies in January 1969 by Terry Sylvester, formerly of the Escorts and the Swinging Blue Jeans. Sylvester also substituted for Nash as part of the group's songwriting team, with Clarke and Hicks. As planned before Nash's departure, the group's next album was Hollies Sing Dylan, which reached No. 3 on the UK chart, while the US version, Words and Music by Bob Dylan, was ignored.

Nash's departure saw the Hollies again turn to outside writers for their single A-sides, but the group's British chart fortunes rallied during 1969 and 1970, and they scored four consecutive UK Top 20 hits (including two consecutive Top 5 placings) in this period, beginning with the Geoff Stephens/Tony Macaulay song "Sorry Suzanne" (February 1969), which reached No. 3 in the UK The follow-up was the emotional ballad "He Ain't Heavy, He's My Brother," which drew from the Parable of the Good Samaritan and was written by Bobby Scott and Bob Russell. It also featured the piano playing of Elton John; reaching No. 3 in the UK in October 1969, and No. 7 in the US in March 1970. The next album, Hollies Sing Hollies, did not chart in the UK, but did well in the US—where it reached No. 32 after being retitled He Ain't Heavy, He's My Brother and including that song—and in Canada.

== 1970s ==
The Hollies in 1970; from left: Terry Sylvester, Bernie Calvert, Bobby Elliott, Allan Clarke, Tony Hicks.

The Hollies' next single, "I Can't Tell the Bottom from the Top", again featured the young Elton John on piano and reached UK No. 7 in May 1970, charting in twelve countries. The UK hits continued with "Gasoline Alley Bred" (written by Cook/Greenaway/Macaulay) (Oct. 1970, UK No. 14, Australia No. 20), while the Tony Hicks song "Too Young to Be Married" – merely an album track in the UK and the US – became a No. 1 single in Australia, New Zealand and Malaysia, also reaching No. 9 in Singapore. Allan Clarke's hard-edged rocker "Hey Willy" made No. 22 in the UK in 1971 and charted in eight other countries.

Like Graham Nash before him, frontman Allan Clarke by 1971 was growing frustrated, and he too began clashing with producer Ron Richards over material; after seeing Nash's success since departing, he was eager to leave the group and cut a solo album. After the 1971 album Distant Light, which concluded the band's EMI/Parlophone contract in the UK (and reached No. 21 on the American Billboard chart), Clarke departed from the Hollies in December.

The Hollies signed with Polydor for the UK/Europe in 1972, although their US contract with Epic still had three more albums to run. Swedish singer Mikael Rickfors, formerly of the group Bamboo (who had supported the Hollies in Sweden in 1967), was quickly recruited by the rest of the band and sang lead on the group's first Polydor single "The Baby" (UK No. 26, March 1972). When Mikael first auditioned for them, he tried to sing in Allan Clarke's higher vocal range, and the results were terrible. The rest of the group decided it might be better to record songs with him starting from scratch. Terry Sylvester and Tony Hicks blended with Rickfors' baritone voice instead of him trying to imitate Clarke's tenor voice.

Meanwhile, in a counter-programming move, Parlophone lifted a Clarke-composed track from the previously unsuccessful album Distant Light that also featured Clarke on lead vocals and lead guitar, the Creedence Clearwater Revival-inspired "Long Cool Woman in a Black Dress". Parlophone released this as a rival single to "The Baby" in February 1972, although it was only moderately successful in the UK (No. 32). In the US, Epic, which owned the rights to Distant Light but had not released it, finally released the album in April 1972 and the single in May 1972. Surprisingly, the song became a smash hit outside of Europe, peaking at No. 2 in the US (the Hollies' highest-charting single in the US) and Australia.

"Long Dark Road" is another track from Distant Light, with lead vocals by Clarke. It was released as a US single in fall 1972, reaching No. 26.

Meanwhile, the Rickfors-led Hollies released their first album Romany (which reached No. 84 in the US) in October 1972. A second Rickfors-sung single, "Magic Woman Touch" (1972), failed to chart in the UK, becoming the band's first official single to miss the UK charts since 1963, although it did chart in seven other countries, reaching the Top Ten in the Netherlands, New Zealand and Hong Kong.

A second Rickfors/Hollies album, Out on the Road (1973), was recorded and issued in Germany. Clarke rejoined the band in the summer of 1973, and Rickfors left.

After Clarke's return, the Hollies returned to the UK Top 30 with a song penned by Clarke: "The Day That Curly Billy Shot Down Crazy Sam McGee" (UK No. 24, 1973). In 1974 they scored what was to be their last major new US and UK hit single with the Albert Hammond/Mike Hazlewood-composed love song "The Air That I Breathe" (previously recorded by Hammond and by Phil Everly on his 1973 solo album, Star Spangled Springer), which reached No. 2 in the UK and Australia and made the Top 10 in the US. The single "Another Night", produced by Alan Parsons, which was released after the aforementioned single, appeared on Billboard's Rock Singles Best Sellers chart at no. 32 on 28 July 1975 and peaked at no. 71 on the publication's Hot 100.

After the US failure of the Hollies' single "4th of July, Asbury Park", written by Bruce Springsteen, Epic gave up on the Hollies in the US, combining their two 1976 albums into their last US release of the decade, Clarke, Hicks, Sylvester, Calvert, Elliott.

The Hollies continued to have singles chart hits during the rest of the seventies, although mostly in Europe as well as in New Zealand where they performed and recorded in 1975/76. In 1976, for example, the group released three singles in three different styles, none of which charted in the UK or the US. "Star" charted only in New Zealand and Australia, "Daddy Don't Mind" charted only in the Netherlands and Germany, and "Wiggle That Wotsit" charted only in the Netherlands, Sweden, and New Zealand.

== 1980s ==
In 1980, the Hollies returned to the UK charts with the single "Soldier's Song", written and produced by Mike Batt, which was a minor hit in 1980 reaching No. 58 in the UK. They also released an album of Buddy Holly covers named Buddy Holly.

In May 1981, Calvert and Sylvester left the group. Alan Coates joined the band on rhythm guitar and high harmony vocals shortly afterwards.

The Hollies went back into the studio on 6 June 1981 with singer/writer/guitarist John Miles and session bassist Alan Jones to record "Carrie" and "Driver". But neither one of these songs was released at this time ("Carrie" appeared as the B-side of the re-released "He Ain't Heavy" in 1988).

In August 1981, the remaining Hollies released "Holliedaze" on EMI, a medley edited together by Tony Hicks from their hit records, which returned them to the UK Top 30. At the request of the BBC, Nash and Haydock briefly rejoined in September 1981 to promote the record on Top of the Pops. The Hollies issued their last Polydor single "Take My Love and Run" (written by keyboard player Brian Chatton, who also appeared with the Hollies while they promoted the single on TV) in November 1981, but this failed to chart.

Graham Nash joined them for the recording of an Alan Tarney song, "Somethin' Ain't Right", on 10 September 1982, which led to a proper reunion album, What Goes Around..., issued on WEA Records. Nash continued appearing with the Hollies through early 1984, culminating in the Hollies' last hit in the US Top 40 with a remake of the Supremes' "Stop in the Name of Love", which reached No. 29 in 1983. "Stop in the Name of Love" was taken from What Goes Around..., which was released in July 1983 and charted in the US on the Billboard top 200 albums at No. 90. A live album featuring the Clarke-Hicks-Elliott-Nash re-grouping, Reunion, was recorded at Kings Island Amusement Park in Ohio, during a US tour that followed that same year, finally being issued first in 1997 as Archive Alive, then retitled Reunion (with two extra tracks) in 2004.

The Hollies continued to tour and perform through the 1980s.

After its use in a TV beer commercial (for Miller Lite lager) in 1988, "He Ain't Heavy" was reissued in the UK and reached No. 1. By this time, bassist Ray Stiles, formerly a member of 1970s glam rock group Mud, had joined the permanent line-up.

A compilation album, All the Hits & More: The Definitive Collection, was released in 1988 and charted in the UK.

== 1990s–2026 ==
In 1993, the Hollies had their 30th anniversary as a band. A compilation album, The Air That I Breathe: The Very Best of the Hollies, charted at No. 15 in the UK. This album included a new single, "The Woman I Love", which charted at No. 42 in the UK. Graham Nash again reunited with the Hollies to record a new version of "Peggy Sue Got Married" that featured prerecorded lead vocals by Buddy Holly, taken from an 'alternate' version of the song given to Nash by Holly's widow, María Elena Holly. This "Buddy Holly & the Hollies" recording opened the Not Fade Away tribute album to Holly by various artists. The Hollies also continued to tour and make TV appearances.

The Hollies were awarded an Ivor Novello Award in 1995 for Outstanding Contribution to British Music.

Allan Clarke retired in February 2000. He was replaced by Carl Wayne, former lead singer of the Move. A New Zealand Hollies Greatest Hits compilation made No. 1 in that country in 2001, dislodging the Beatles' 1 collection from the top spot. While re-establishing the band as a touring attraction over 2000 to mid-2004, Carl Wayne only recorded one song with them, "How Do I Survive?" the last (and only new) track on the 2003 Greatest Hits (which reached No. 21 on the UK Albums Chart). After Wayne's death from cancer in August 2004, he was replaced by Peter Howarth. Shortly afterward, Alan Coates left the band and was replaced by Steve Lauri.

The Hollies charted at No. 21 in the UK in 2003 with the compilation album Greatest Hits from EMI in CD format. (EMI has released most of the Hollies' EMI music on CD over the past 25 years.)

The Hollies were inducted into the 'Vocal Group Hall of Fame' in the US in 2006. Also in 2006, the Hollies' first new studio album since 1983, Staying Power, was released by EMI featuring Peter Howarth on lead vocals.

The group released a studio album, Then, Now, Always, in late March 2009, again featuring Peter Howarth on lead vocals. The album was later given an official release by EMI in 2010 with the addition of an extra original song, "She'd Kill for Me".

In recognition of their achievements, the Hollies were inducted to the Rock and Roll Hall of Fame in 2010. In the same year, a compilation album, Midas Touch: The Very Best of the Hollies, charted in the UK at No. 23.

In 2012, the Hollies released Hollies Live Hits! We Got the Tunes!, a live double CD featuring the Hollies' live performances recorded during the band's 2012 UK tour.

In 2013, the Hollies' 50th year was packed with a worldwide 50th Anniversary Concert Tour performing over 60 concerts.

In 2014, EMI released a 3CD compilation; 50 at Fifty which concluded with one new song; "Skylarks" written by Bobby Elliott, Peter Howarth and Steve Vickers.

Original bassist Eric Haydock died on 5 January 2019 at the age of 75.

During 2021, two new books were published, each detailing the career of the band. The first was Bobby Elliott's autobiography It Ain't Heavy, It's My Story, which told the story through his own perspective. The second was by UK author Malcolm C. Searles, entitled Riding the Carousel, which covered the entire career of the group across its 600 pages.

Original drummer Don Rathbone died in September 2024 at the age of 87.

On 20 August 2026, a statement was released by the band, announcing the band's retirement from touring, stating that Hicks had stepped down from touring due to health reasons, and out of respect, Elliott had also decided to retire from touring.

== In the United States ==
The Hollies were one of the last of the major British Invasion groups to have significant chart success in the United States. Their first single was not issued in the US and, although they had a minor US hit in 1964 with "Just One Look", it was not until "Look Through Any Window" that the band reached the US Top 40. Many of their early singles that had been major hits in the UK, including "Here I Go Again", "I'm Alive", "Yes I Will" and "We're Through", failed to even reach the Top 100 in the US.

From 1966 until after they signed to Epic in 1967, the band had their most concentrated success in the US, including four Top 15 songs ("Bus Stop", "Stop Stop Stop", "On a Carousel", and "Carrie Anne"). After this streak ended, they had a few more huge hits: "He Ain't Heavy, He's My Brother" (No. 7, 1969), "Long Cool Woman in a Black Dress" (No. 2, 1972), and "The Air That I Breathe" (No. 6, 1974). Additional US chart hits were the non-UK singles "Pay You Back with Interest" (No. 28, 1966), "Dear Eloise" (No. 50 in 1967), "Long Dark Road" (No. 26, 1972), and the "reunion" single "Stop! In the Name of Love" (No. 29, 1983).

== Rock and Roll Hall of Fame ==
In 2010, the Hollies were inducted into the Rock and Roll Hall of Fame. The band members inducted were Allan Clarke, Graham Nash, Tony Hicks, Eric Haydock, Bobby Elliott, Bernie Calvert, and Terry Sylvester.

== Band members ==
Final lineup

- Tony Hicks – lead guitar, backing vocals (1963–2026)
- Bobby Elliott – drums, percussion (1963–2026)
- Ray Stiles – bass, backing vocals (1986–1990, 1991–2026)
- Ian Parker – keyboards, backing vocals (1991–2026)
- Peter Howarth – lead vocals, acoustic guitar (2004–2026)
- Steve Lauri – rhythm guitar, backing vocals (2004–2026)

== Discography ==
=== Studio albums ===
- Stay with the Hollies (1964)
- Here I Go Again (US 1964)
- In the Hollies Style (1964)
- Hollies (1965)
- Hear! Here! (US 1965)
- Beat Group! (US 1966)
- Would You Believe? (1966)
- Bus Stop (US 1966)
- For Certain Because... (1966)
- Stop! Stop! Stop! (US 1967)
- Evolution (1967)
- Evolution (US version 1967)
- Butterfly (1967)
- Dear Eloise/King Midas in Reverse (US 1967)
- Hollies Sing Dylan (1969)
- Words and Music by Bob Dylan (US 1969)
- Hollies Sing Hollies (1969)
- He Ain't Heavy, He's My Brother (US 1969)
- Confessions of the Mind (1970)
- Moving Finger (US 1971)
- Distant Light (1971)
- Romany (1972)
- Out on the Road (1973)
- Hollies (1974)
- Another Night (1975)
- Write On (1976)
- Russian Roulette (1976)
- Clarke, Hicks, Sylvester, Calvert, Elliott (US 1977)
- A Crazy Steal (1978)
- Five Three One - Double Seven O Four (1979)
- Buddy Holly (1980)
- What Goes Around... (1983)
- Staying Power (2006)
- Then, Now, Always (2009)

=== Live albums ===
- Hollies Live Hits (1976)
- Radio Fun (2012, recorded 1964–1971, reissued as Live at the BBC in 2018)
- Hollies Live Hits! We Got the Tunes! (2013)

=== Compilation albums ===
- The Hollies' Greatest Hits (US 1967)
- Hollies' Greatest (1968)
- Hollies' Greatest/Vol. 2 (1972)
- The Hollies' Greatest Hits (US 1973)
- 20 Golden Greats (1978)
- All the Hits & More (1988)
- Rarities (1988)
- The Air That I Breathe: The Very Best of The Hollies (1993)
- 30th Anniversary Collection 1963–1993 (US 1993)
- The Hollies at Abbey Road 1963–1966 (1997)
- The Hollies at Abbey Road 1966–1970 (1998)
- The Hollies at Abbey Road 1973–1989 (1998)
- Greatest Hits (2003)
- The Long Road Home 1963–2003 (2003, box set)
- Midas Touch: The Very Best of The Hollies (2010)
- Clarke, Hicks & Nash Years: The Complete Hollies April 1963–October 1968 (2011, box set)
- 50 at Fifty (2014)
- Changin' Times: The Complete Hollies January 1969–March 1973 (2015, box set)
- Head Out of Dreams: The Complete Hollies August 1973–May 1988 (2017, box set)
