= Eric Haydock =

British musician (1943–2019)

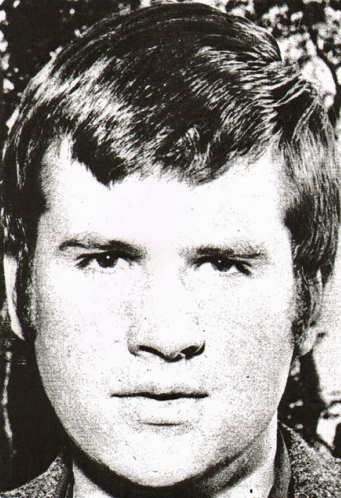
- Haydock in 1966

Background information
- Born: Eric John Haddock; 3 February 1943; Stockport, Cheshire, England
- Died: 5 January 2019 (aged 75) England
- Genres: Rock; pop
- Occupation: Musician
- Instrument: Bass guitar
- Years active: 1962–2019

Eric John Haydock (3 February 1943 – 5 January 2019) was a British musician, best known as the original bassist of the Hollies from December 1962 until July 1966.

== Biography ==
=== Early life ===
Haydock was born in Stockport and educated in the area. In 1960 he joined the Deltas, a Manchester comedy band which also included Vic Steele and Don Rathbone. After meeting Allan Clarke and Graham Nash, Haydock persuaded them to join the group, which was renamed the Hollies in December 1962.

=== The Hollies ===
In April 1963 the Hollies secured a record deal with EMI and relocated to London. Haydock's bass playing was described as a "crucial ingredient" in the group's early sound, as exemplified on hits such as "Just One Look", "Look Through Any Window", and "I'm Alive". He was one of the first pop musicians to play a six-string Fender Bass VI, which he imported from the United States.

Haydock was infamous for being a practical joker, including one instance when he allegedly cut the power cords to the amplifiers being used by the Dave Clark Five on a concert bill shared with the Hollies. While his bandmates often enjoyed his antics when committed on others, when Haydock played tricks on the other Hollies, it was less appreciated, and led to some strained relations between the bassist and the other members from time to time.

Although considered a good bass guitarist, he was replaced in 1966 by Bernie Calvert, after disputes related to the conduct of the band's managers. He wanted to raise £2,000 for a house, but when he failed to raise the money, he told manager Michael Cohen that he would not return to the band until he had sorted out his finances. A month later, he learned that he had been replaced. Bobby Elliott and others recalled that Haydock began missing live shows and recording sessions without warning, and had become unreliable (temporary session replacements on bass during this time included Klaus Voormann, Jack Bruce, and John Paul Jones). Years later, Graham Nash claimed that Haydock, although newly married, was also carrying on an affair with another woman, and did not want to tour with the Hollies any longer because he wanted to stay close to her. Haydock vehemently denied this when the story emerged in the press, and he also insisted that he only missed some concert and recording dates because he was ill, and that he provided his doctor's notes to the band to prove it.

Haydock's last album with the band was Bus Stop, which had been released after his departure, but included recordings in which he contributed to, although it was Calvert who played bass on the titular song that would later go on to become a hit; however, Haydock appeared with the group on Top of the Pops in June 1966, performing the song "Bus Stop".

When Pete Quaife left The Kinks in early 1966, Haydock was offered the chance to replace him, but turned it down as he believed he still had a place in The Hollies. However, he claimed, the very next day he was officially fired, but by that point the offer from the Kinks was no longer available.

In 1997, Haydock was sued by the Hollies for promoting his new band as "Eric Haydock's Hollies". The lawsuit resulted in Haydock being banned from using the name.

On 15 March 2010, Haydock along with Calvert and the other fellow Hollies members Allan Clarke, Graham Nash, Tony Hicks, Bobby Elliott, and Terry Sylvester were inducted into the Rock and Roll Hall of Fame.

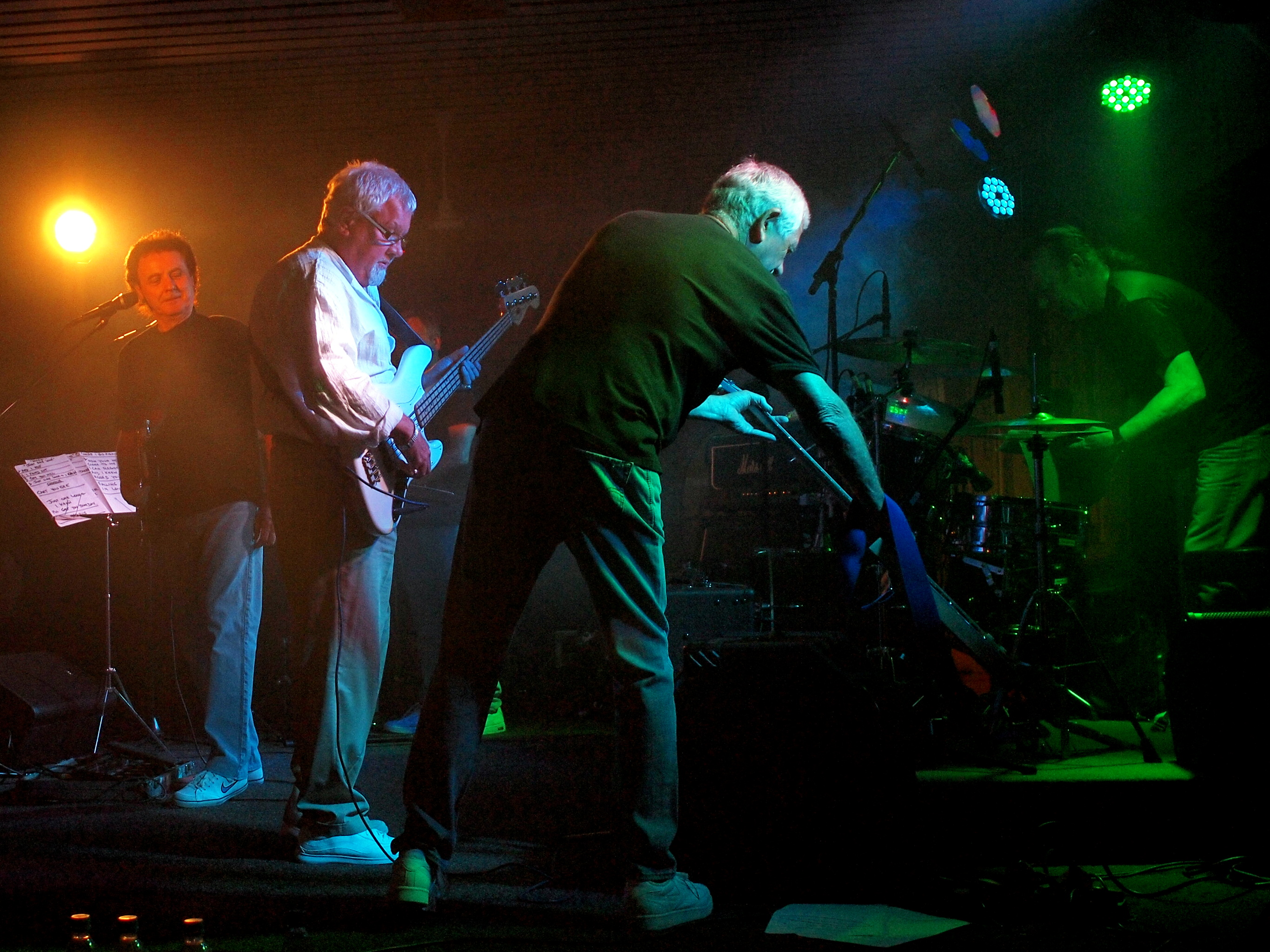
Haydock (2nd from left) guest performs at a Swinging Blue Jeans concert, Parikkala, Finland, 2013

Haydock guest appeared at a Swinging Blue Jeans concert in Parikkala, Finland on 13 July 2013.

== Personal life and death ==
Haydock was married to Pamela Dore in 1965, but their marriage ended in divorce. They had three children. He died at his home on 5 January 2019, at the age of 75. He had been ill for some time.
