= Allan Clarke (singer) =

British rock singer and songwriter (born 1942)

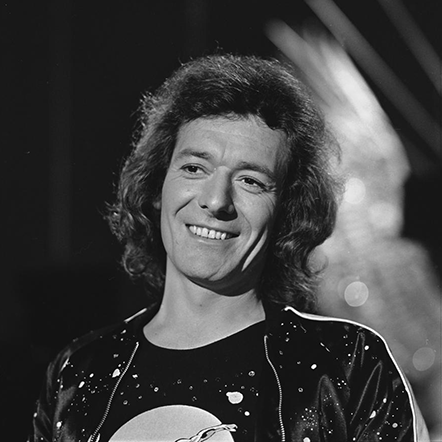
- Clarke on TopPop in 1974

Background information
- Born: Harold Allan Clarke; 5 April 1942 (age 84); Salford, Lancashire, England
- Genres: Rock; soft rock
- Occupations: Singer; musician
- Instruments: Vocals; harmonica; guitar
- Years active: 1958–2000, 2011, 2019–present
- Formerly of: The Hollies
- Website: allan-clarke.co.uk

Harold Allan Clarke (born 5 April 1942) is an English singer and musician who was one of the founding members and the original lead singer of The Hollies. He achieved international hit singles with the group and is credited as co-writer on several of their best-known songs, including "On a Carousel", "Carrie Anne", "Jennifer Eccles" and "Long Cool Woman in a Black Dress". He retired from performing in 2000, but returned to the music industry in 2019. Clarke was inducted into the Rock and Roll Hall of Fame in 2010 as a member of the Hollies.

== Career ==
Harold Allan Clarke and his childhood friend Graham Nash began singing together in Manchester while still at school. They formed The Hollies in December 1962 with Vic Steele (lead guitar) and Eric Haydock (bass guitar). In April 1963, they added Tony Hicks (replacing Steele on lead guitar) and Bobby Elliott (replacing Don Rathbone on drums). In 1966, Bernie Calvert replaced Haydock as bass guitarist. Clarke was The Hollies' original lead singer, but also played occasional guitar and harmonica. In the UK they enjoyed 30 chart singles, plus two further chart entries with re-releases, 17 of which made the Top 10, with two – "I'm Alive" (1965) and "He Ain't Heavy, He's My Brother" (1988 re-issue) – reaching No. 1.

In the US charts they achieved 23 chart singles, six of which reached the Top 10. Many of the group's songs were co-written by Clarke, usually with Nash and Hicks, until Nash's departure at the end of 1968. They initially used the pseudonym "L. Ransford" for their songwriting credits, then 'Clarke-Nash-Hicks' from mid-1966 onwards. In 1966, Clarke, along with several Hollies bandmates, assisted in the Everly Brothers' recording of their album Two Yanks in England, which featured Everly cover versions of mostly Hollies songs co-written by Clarke.

Clarke-Nash-Hicks composed The Hollies' albums For Certain Because (1966), Evolution (1967) and Butterfly (1967). Their UK hit singles compilation The Hollies' Greatest Hits topped the UK Albums Chart in August 1968.

After 1967, Clarke began writing solo songs under the team banner, notably: "Lullaby To Tim" (dedicated to his son, though sung by Nash), "Heading for a Fall", "Water on the Brain", and "Would You Believe?". Besides the full composing team, Clarke also wrote songs with Nash, such as "Try It", "Wishyouawish" (1967), "Tomorrow When it Comes", "Jennifer Eccles" and "Wings" (1968). Clarke assumed more of a profile as the front man of The Hollies following Nash's departure from the group in December 1968. Clarke was the sole lead singer on Hollies Sing Dylan (a UK No. 3 album in early 1969).

Clarke has sole credit for songs including "My Life Is Over With You", "Goodbye Tomorrow", "Not That Way at All", "Marigold" (1969), "Mad Professor Blyth", "Separated" (1970), "Row the Boat Together" and "Hold On" (1971).

Also, Clarke helped Nash's replacement, Terry Sylvester, develop as a songwriter, teaming with him to write a number of songs including "Gloria Swansong", "Look at Life" (1969), "I Wanna Shout", "Man Without a Heart" and "Perfect Lady Housewife" (1970).

=== Departure from and return to The Hollies ===
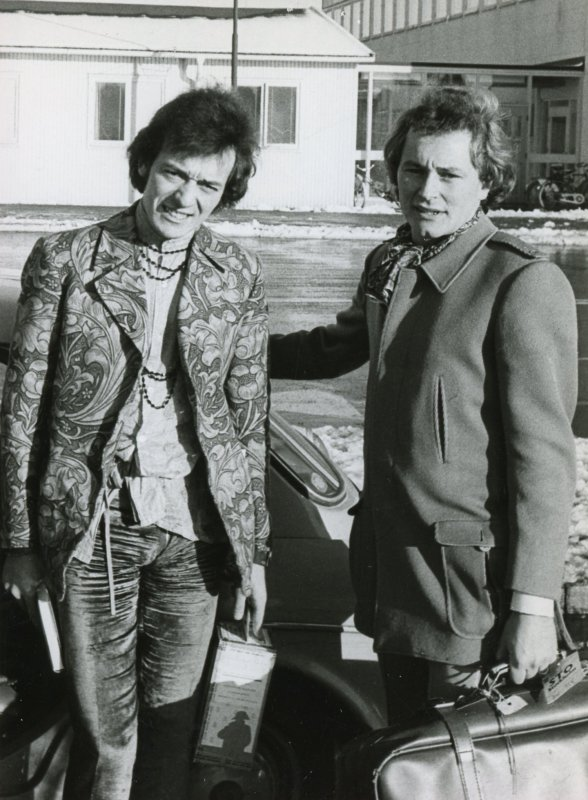
Clarke and Lenne Broberg, 1967

Keen to launch a solo career due to Nash's success in Crosby, Stills & Nash, Clarke left the group in 1971. He was replaced by the Swedish singer Mikael Rickfors, who was formerly with Bamboo. Clarke went on to release two solo albums: My Real Name Is 'Arold (Epic, 1972) and Headroom (EMI, 1973).

After Clarke left The Hollies, "Long Cool Woman in a Black Dress", a song from their 1971 album Distant Light which he had co-written with songwriter Roger Cook and on which Clarke sang lead and played lead guitar, became an international hit single, reaching No. 2 in the US (their most successful single ever there) and No. 32 in the UK Singles Chart. The Hollies toured with Nash's replacement, Sylvester, who assumed the lead vocal on performance of the single instead of Clarke. Rickfors left the group and Clarke rejoined them in July 1973. Their first single with him back in the fold was another of his songs, "The Day that Curly Billy Shot Down Crazy Sam McGee", a UK top 40 hit that autumn.

Clarke continued to record and release solo albums while remaining with The Hollies, although his solo career did not achieve much album or single chart success. He released his self-titled third album in 1974. His next album was I've Got Time (1976). He also performed lead vocals on "Breakdown" by The Alan Parsons Project, from their 1977 album I Robot. He left The Hollies briefly for the second time in March 1978 and made I Wasn't Born Yesterday (1978), an album of original material mostly written with singer-songwriter Gary Benson. It yielded a US chart hit single in "(I Will Be Your) Shadow in the Street". He returned to the group in August. Subsequent solo albums included Legendary Heroes (1980), another largely original set, with its UK title and track running order changed to The Only One. He followed with a Best of... compilation (Aura, 1981). His final solo album of the last century was Reasons to Believe (1990), issued in Germany on Polydor Records, which remains unreleased in the US and UK.

Between 1974 and 1978, Clarke wrote most of the original songs The Hollies recorded on a series of studio albums with Tony Hicks and Terry Sylvester.

In 1982, Clarke issued a rare non-album single, "Someone Else Will", on Forever Records; however, the song failed to chart. Clarke recorded cover versions of Bruce Springsteen's "Born to Run", "Blinded by the Light" and "If I Were the Priest". In this period, Clarke also used material by Lindsey Buckingham, Janis Ian, Gavin Sutherland, and Randy Newman.

1993 saw Clarke's final chart success with The Hollies, with the Nik Kershaw-penned single "The Woman I Love", which charted in the UK at No. 42.

In 1996, Clarke, with The Hollies and Graham Nash, contributed harmony and support vocals to a new version of "Peggy Sue Got Married", featuring lead vocals by Buddy Holly, which was credited as 'Buddy Holly and The Hollies'. It appeared on the Not Fade Away tribute album.

== Temporary retirement and later re-emergence ==
Due in part to ongoing problems with his vocal cords, Clarke retired from the music industry in 1999 to care for his wife, who had received a second diagnosis of cancer. Clarke was replaced in the band by Carl Wayne, former lead singer of the Move. Wayne died in 2004. The Hollies continue touring and recording today with Peter Howarth as their vocalist.

On 15 March 2010, Clarke, with fellow Hollies members Graham Nash, Tony Hicks, Eric Haydock, Bobby Elliott, Terry Sylvester and Bernie Calvert, was inducted into the Rock and Roll Hall of Fame. In 2011, Clarke made a surprise appearance at a Crosby & Nash concert at the Royal Albert Hall where the two former Hollies performed "Bus Stop".

Having appeared on harmonica for Carla Olson's band The Textones in 2018, Clarke made a return to his solo career in 2019 with a new album, Resurgence, on BMG. He announced in January 2023 that he was working on his ninth solo album, titled, I'll Never Forget. It was released on 7 April 2023. Graham Nash sings harmony on 7 of the 11 songs.

== Personal life ==
Clarke married Jennifer Bowstead on 24 March 1964 in Coventry. They have three children: Tim (born 1966), Toby (b. 1969) and Piper (b. 1972).

The Hollies' song title "Jennifer Eccles" was a combination of the names of Clarke's wife and Graham Nash's then-wife, Rose Eccles.

== Discography ==
=== Studio albums ===
- My Real Name Is 'Arold (1972)
- Headroom (1973)
- Allan Clarke (1974)
- I've Got Time (1976)
- I Wasn't Born Yesterday (1978)
- The Only One (a.k.a. Legendary Heroes) (1980)
- Reasons to Believe (1990)
- Resurgence (2019)
- I'll Never Forget (2023)

=== Album appearances ===
- 1964: The Rolling Stones - the Rolling Stones - backup vocals on "Little by Little" with Graham Nash
- 1977: I Robot - the Alan Parsons Project - lead vocals on "Breakdown"
- 1999: Portraits of Bob Dylan - Steve Howe - lead vocals on "Don't Think Twice, It's All Right"
