= Bus Stop (song) =

1966 single by The Hollies

- West German picture sleeve

Single by the Hollies

from the album Bus Stop
- B-side: "Don't Run and Hide"
- Released: 17 June 1966
- Recorded: 18 May 1966
- Studio: EMI, London
- Genre: Rock; pop rock; folk rock; raga rock
- Length: 2:53
- Label: Parlophone
- Songwriter: Graham Gouldman
- Producer: Ron Richards

The Hollies singles chronology
| "I Can't Let Go" (1966) | "Bus Stop" (1966) | "After the Fox" (1966) |

"Bus Stop" is a song recorded and released as a single by the British rock band the Hollies in 1966. It reached No. 5 in the UK Singles Chart. It was the Hollies' first US top ten hit, reaching No. 5 on the Billboard charts in September 1966. In Canada the song reached No. 1 and was their second top ten hit there.

== Background ==
"Bus Stop" was written by Graham Gouldman, who also penned major hits for the Yardbirds ("For Your Love") and Herman's Hermits ("No Milk Today"), as well as the Hollies' first venture into the US top 40 with "Look Through Any Window". With the release of "Bus Stop" as a single in June 1966, the Hollies joined the trend known as raga rock, a subgenre first popularised by the Beatles, the Byrds and the Kinks. Musicologist William Echard highlights the guitar solo and its sitar-like sound as an indicator of the Indian musical element evident in the song. Billboard said of the single that there was a "good group vocal on this teen-aimed, easy-rocker with more commercial potential than their [earlier single] "I Can't Let Go." Cash Box described the song as a "rollicking, hard-driving bluesy weeper with a plaintive, melodic undercurrent."

In a 1976 interview Gouldman said the idea for "Bus Stop" had come while he was riding home from work on a bus. The opening lines were written by his father, playwright Hyme Gouldman. Graham Gouldman continued with the rest of the song in his bedroom, apart from the middle-eight, which he finished while riding to work – a men's outfitters – on the bus the next day.

Thirty years later he elaborated on the song's beginnings: "'Bus Stop', I had the title and I came home one day and he (Hyme) said 'I've started something on that Bus Stop idea you had, and I'm going to play it for you. He'd written Bus stop, wet day, she's there, I say please share my umbrella and it's like when you get a really great part of a lyric or, I also had this nice riff as well, and when you have such a great start to a song it's kind of like the rest is easy. It's like finding your way onto a road and when you get onto the right route, you just follow it." "My late father was a writer. He was great to have around. I would write something and always show him the lyric and he would fix it for me. You know, he'd say 'There's a better word than this' – he was kind of like a walking thesaurus as well and quite often, sometimes, he came up with titles for songs as well. 'No Milk Today' is one of his titles, and also the 10cc song 'Art for Art's Sake'."

== Chart history ==
=== Weekly charts ===
| Chart (1966) | Peak position |
|---|---|
| Australia (Kent Music Report) | 2 |
| Canada (RPM) | 1 |
| Finland (Suomen Virallinen) | 18 |
| Ireland (IRMA) | 4 |
| Netherlands (Single Top 100) | 4 |
| New Zealand (Listener) | 3 |
| Norway (VG-lista) | 3 |
| South Africa | 11 |
| Sweden | 1 |
| UK Singles (UK Singles Chart) | 5 |
| US Billboard Hot 100 | 5 |
| US Cash Box Top 100 | 5 |
| West Germany (GfK) | 9 |

=== Year-end charts ===
| Chart (1966) | Rank |
|---|---|
| US Billboard Hot 100 | 45 |
| US Cash Box | 34 |
