= Tony Hicks =

English guitarist and singer (born 1945)

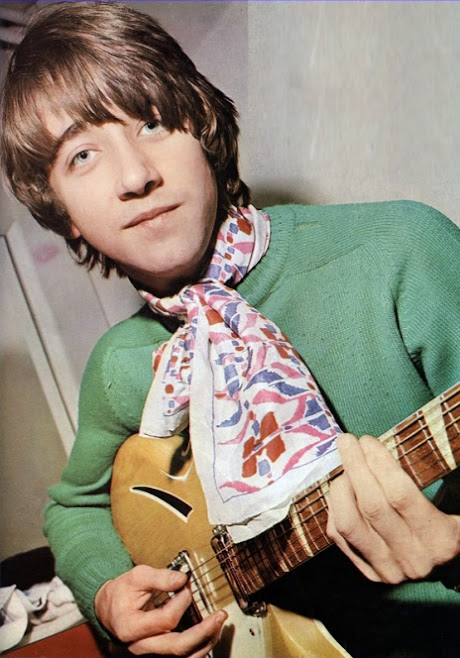
- Hicks in 1968

Background information
- Born: Anthony Christopher Hicks; 16 December 1945 (age 80)
- Origin: Nelson, Lancashire, England
- Genres: Rock; pop
- Occupation: Musician
- Instruments: Guitar; banjo; electric sitar; mandolin; vocals
- Years active: 1957–present
- Formerly of: The Hollies
- Website: www.hollies.co.uk

Anthony Christopher Hicks (born 16 December 1945) is an English guitarist and singer who has been a member of the British rock/pop band the Hollies since 1963, and as such was inducted into the Rock and Roll Hall of Fame in 2010. His main roles within the band are lead guitarist and backing singer.

== Career ==
=== Early years ===
Hicks first had a taste of fame at age 12 as a member of Les Skifflettes when they were featured on the Carroll Levis talent show in 1957. By the early 1960s, he was a respected member of the Manchester music scene and had become the lead guitarist with Ricky Shaw and the Dolphins, while working as an apprentice electrician. When then local rivals the Hollies needed a replacement for their guitarist Vic Steele in February 1963, Hicks was immediately approached to join the band and although initially reluctant, he was finally persuaded to join after listening to The Hollies through the air vent of the Twisted Wheel club in Manchester. Hicks shrewdly negotiated an £18 per week wage to join, despite the other members being paid just £9 per week. They had by this time secured a test recording session with EMI's Parlophone label with staff producer Ron Richards, whom the band later credited with creating and choosing their greatest hits. Hicks duly attended the session as their new guitarist in April 1963 and the audition resulted in a recording contract with Parlophone.

=== With the Hollies ===
The Hollies soon became one of the most successful bands in Britain; they had a distinctive, breezy pop style built around the three-part harmony of Hicks (lower harmony) and bandmates Allan Clarke (lead vocals) and Graham Nash (high harmony). Hicks contributed his first solo composition for the group ("When I'm Not There") to an EP release in 1964 and co-wrote a B-side ("Keep Off That Friend of Mine") with drummer Bobby Elliott that year. Hicks then joined Clarke and Nash as the group's in-house songwriting team, who from 1964 to mid-1966 wrote as "Chester Mann" and "L. Ransford" before adopting the Clarke-Hicks-Nash banner. By the mid-1960s the threesome had become responsible for writing most of their songs, including singles hits such as "Stop! Stop! Stop!", "On a Carousel", "Carrie Anne" and "King Midas in Reverse". Hicks rarely sang lead vocals on Hollies songs, but was featured on "Look Through Any Window" (1965), and sang verse leads on "Too Much Monkey Business" (1964), "Carrie Anne" (a song he began for the band in Stavanger, Norway in 1967) and "Open Up Your Eyes" (1968). Hicks took solo lead vocals on his song "Pegasus" (1967), the Clarke-Sylvester-penned "Look at Life" (1969), his "Born A Man" (1973), "Hillsborough" (1989) and Bobby Elliott's "Then, Now, Always (Dolphin Days)" (2009).

In 1966, with contributions from fellow Hollies Clarke and Nash, Hicks contributed guitar work alongside Yardbirds guitarist and session musician Jimmy Page to The Everly Brothers' album Two Yanks in England (which included cover versions of a number of Hollies songs co-written by Hicks).

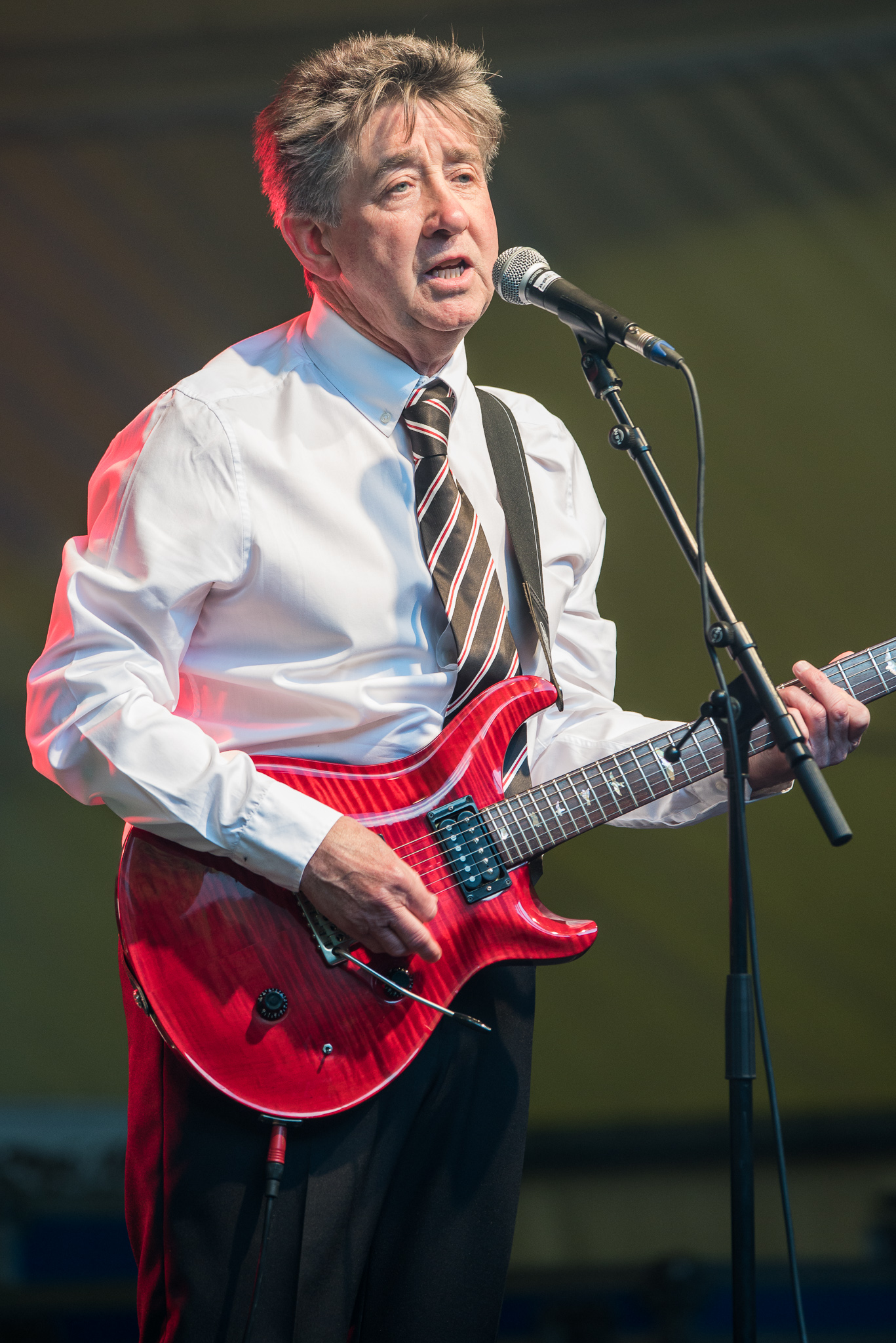
Hicks performing with The Hollies in 2017.

In the 1960s, with Nash performing few guitar duties except for the occasional rhythm part and acoustic work, Hicks became an integral part of the Hollies sound. Apart from contributing distinctive lead-guitar parts, he could be relied on to add unusual instrumentation to their sessions—such as the banjo which was a key component of their hit "Stop! Stop! Stop!", Greek-type ("Tell Me to My Face"), electric sitar ("The Baby"), and fuzz guitar ("Have You Ever Loved Somebody"). When no original material was available, Hicks discovered demos of Hollies hits "Just One Look" (UK No. 2 in 1964), "I Can't Let Go" (UK No. 2 in 1966) and "He Ain't Heavy, He's My Brother" (UK No. 3 in 1969) (which became one of their biggest hits).

Hicks suggested the band do an album of Bob Dylan songs in late 1968; Nash disagreed, one of the reasons for his exit from the band (although he had already sung with David Crosby and Stephen Stills in the US). The Hollies replaced Nash with Terry Sylvester and Hollies Sing Dylan (1969) was No. 3 in the UK Albums Chart, although it failed to chart in the US. This was one of the first "tribute albums" devoted to a single artist by a vocal group.

After Nash's December 1968 departure from the group Hicks began to write more solo songs, which were used as either B-sides or album tracks (such as "Cos You Like To Love Me" and "Don't Give Up Easily" in 1969 and "Dandelion Wine" in 1970). He wrote much of The Hollies' 1970 album Confessions of the Mind, including "Too Young To Be Married" (a No. 1 single in Australia and New Zealand).

Hicks also co-wrote songs with UK singer Kenny Lynch for The Hollies, such as "What A Life I've Led", "Look What We've Got", "Promised Land", the US hit single "Long Dark Road" (all 1971) and "Blue in the Morning" (1972) and "Faded Images", recorded by Cilla Black on her 1971 album Images. He co-wrote Hollies songs between 1974 and 1978 with Allan Clarke and Terry Sylvester. In 1974, Hicks produced the eponymous group album Taggett on EMI Records in the UK.

In 1990, Hicks co-wrote "Naomi" for The Hollies with his son Paul. In 1993 he added new guitar parts and harmony vocals (with Clarke and Nash) to an "alternate" version of "Peggy Sue Got Married" by Buddy Holly (credited to "Buddy Holly and The Hollies"), which led off the Not Fade Away tribute album to Holly by various artists.

The Hollies continued to have hits beyond the 1970s, including a UK chart hit with the medley "Holliedaze" in 1981, a US Top 30 hit cover of "Stop! In the Name of Love" in 1983, a UK No. 1 single in 1988 (a re-issue of "He Ain't Heavy, He's My Brother"), and in 1993 "The Woman I Love". The group continued to perform and record until 2026; however, with the retirement of Allan Clarke in 1999, only Hicks and drummer Bobby Elliott remained from the band's 1960s heyday.

On August 20, 2026, Hicks and Elliott announced their retirement from touring due to Hicks's declining health.

== Awards and honours ==
In 2010, The Hollies (who had already won an Ivor Novello Award in 1995 for outstanding contribution to British popular music and were inducted into the Vocal Group Hall of Fame in 2006) were inducted into the Rock and Roll Hall of Fame. Hicks and Elliott were absent from the induction ceremony because of UK touring commitments with the current Hollies band.

== Personal life ==
Hicks dated model Jane Lumb in the mid-1960s. Hicks has been married to Jane Dalton since 1974.
