= Bobby Elliott =

English rock drummer (born 1941)

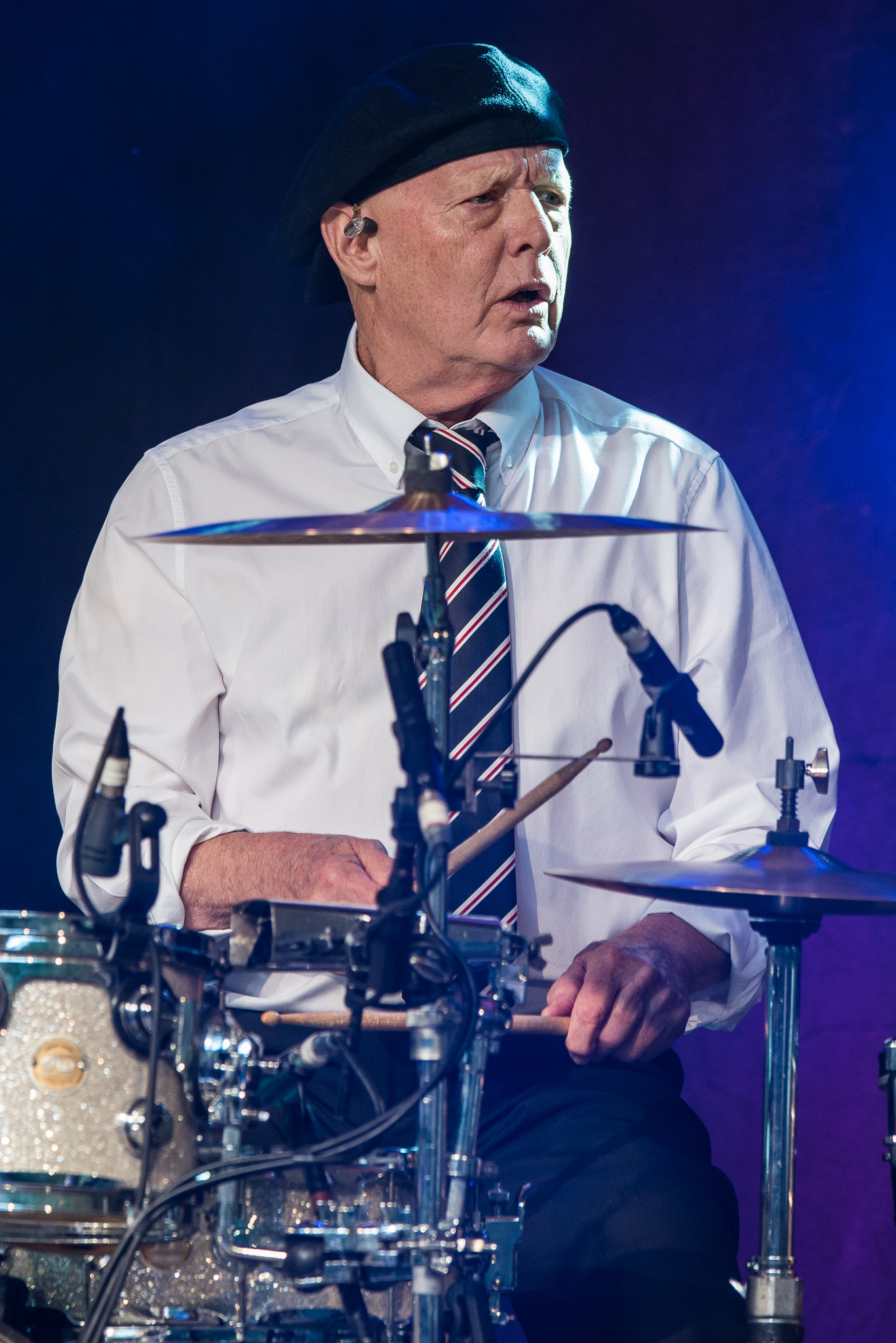
- Elliott performing with The Hollies in 2017

Background information
- Born: Robert Hartley Elliott; 8 December 1941 (age 84); Burnley, Lancashire, England
- Genre: Rock
- Instrument: Drums
- Years active: 1959–present
- Formerly of: The Hollies, Shane Fenton and the Fentones

Robert Hartley Elliott (born 8 December 1941) is an English rock drummer, best known for playing with the Hollies. He has been described as "one of the very finest drummers in all of pop/rock".

== Early life ==
Elliott discovered jazz music when he was around 10 or 11 and wanted to become a drummer. He attended Nelson Grammar School. Elliott taught himself how to play the drums, by using home-made brushes and sticks, on tins and other household items, and copying the playing of Chico Hamilton of the Gerry Mulligan Quartet and Gene Krupa of the Benny Goodman Orchestra. At first, he was a jazz drummer, but changed to rock and roll.

== Career ==
=== Shane Fenton and the Fentones ===
Elliott was an original member of Johnny Theakston and the Tremeloes, who formed in 1959, and were fronted by the vocalist Johnny Theakston. In late 1960 they sent a demo tape to BBC Radio's Saturday Club, calling themselves Shane Fenton and the Fentones, but Theakston died before they received a reply. Having been offered an audition, the band's roadie Bernard Jewry (later known as Alvin Stardust), stepped in as vocalist, adopting the stage name “Shane Fenton” at Theakston's mother's request. In 1961, Tommy Sanderson became their manager, and negotiated a record deal with EMI who released "I'm a Moody Guy", which reached 22 on the UK singles chart. The next three singles failed to chart, and the band broke up in April 1963.

=== The Hollies ===
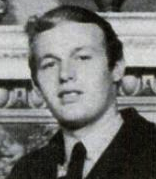
Elliott with The Hollies in 1965.

Elliott played in Ricky Shaw and the Dolphins, a band led by guitarist Tony Hicks who left to join the Hollies. Shortly after, Don Rathbone left the Hollies and Elliott replaced him.

The Hollies would quickly garner a cult following after their songs Here I Go Again, Look Through Any Window, and Just One Look charted in the British charts. Future hits would include: "Bus Stop", "On a Carousel", "Carrie Anne", "He Ain't Heavy, He's My Brother" and "The Air That I Breathe", among others. The Hollies announced their retirement from touring in 2026.

In September 1973, they were working on the opening track for their Hollies album, when Paul McCartney offered him the position of drummer in his band Wings, but Elliott declined due to commitments with the Hollies, saying his "heart was with the Hollies". The Hollies were inducted into the Rock and Roll Hall of Fame in 2010. Elliott and Hicks did not attend the ceremony as they were booked to play a gig with the band in London at the London Palladium.

== Personal life ==
Prominent drummers who were influenced by Elliott include Gilson Lavis, Ric Lee, Cozy Powell and Ian Paice.

Elliott’s hair began thinning at a young age (around the time the Hollies took off). So on stage, he would wear a variety of hats to cover up his balding. This decision would eventually inspire more artists (balding or not) to wear hats on stage, helping to bring wearing hats into rock and roll.

By the 1970s, Elliott had gone completely bald and eventually, Elliott, a blond, started wearing a long brunette wig on stage. This wig can be seen on the cover of their 1974 Hollies album.

Elliott, who onetime lived in the village of Roughlee near Pendle, returned to that village to unveil the statue of Alice Nutter, one of the 'Pendle witches' in 2012.
