= Ron Richards (producer) =

British record producer

Ron Richards (born Ronald Richard Pratley; 22 January 1929 – 30 April 2009) was a British record producer, manager and promoter, best known for discovering the Hollies.

== Early life ==
Richards was born in London to Mary Lipscombe and an unknown Irish jockey, and was adopted at an early age. He became a proficient pianist as a child and, after being conscripted, played the piano and saxophone for the Central Band of the Royal Air Force.

== Career ==
Richards started working as a song plugger in London's Tin Pan Alley in 1952, and discovered songwriter Jerry Lordan. He later worked at EMI's Parlophone imprint as an assistant to producer George Martin, who recognised his potential as a producer. Richards discovered the Hollies, and signed them to a recording contract with Parlophone in 1963. He produced most of the Hollies' music between 1963 and 1979, during which time they had seventeen Top 10 hit singles in the UK, as well as worldwide success.

At first, Martin was not greatly involved with Parlophone's new signing, the Beatles, and Richards was assigned to produce their first session in June 1962, which included drummer Pete Best. It was Richards who originally considered Best unsuitable for recording work, although he was not very impressed by Best's replacement, Ringo Starr. Richards hired session drummer Andy White, and Richards and Martin produced the Beatles' first single "Love Me Do".

Richards had suggested the Beatles' first record should be "How Do You Do It?" penned by Mitch Murray and, after Martin took control of the Beatles' sessions, Richards worked with Gerry and the Pacemakers, who were the first act to go to No. 1 with each of their first three singles, "How Do You Do It?", "I Like It" and, using Martin's string arrangement, "You'll Never Walk Alone".

In August 1965, Richards joined Martin in leaving EMI to start Associated Independent Recording. Working for Liberty Records, Richards was also the musical director for P.J. Proby, and together they worked on the Proby albums.

Richards is mentioned in the Beatles' bootleg recordings during the session for "Think for Yourself". After George Martin makes a few mistakes, George Harrison joked about getting Richards to produce Rubber Soul instead. The exact words were, "I wonder if Ron Richards is free tomorrow?" followed by laughs.

One of the songs on Rubber Soul is George Harrison's "If I Needed Someone". On the same day that the Rubber Soul LP came out in Britain (3 December 1965), a cover of that song was released by the Hollies - produced by Ron Richards.

== Personal life ==
Ron Richards who was married in 1954 to Ellen Fraser, had two sons and a daughter. He died in Watford, Hertfordshire, on 30 April 2009, and his funeral was held on 15 May in Hemel Hempstead.
