= Hollis =

Hollis may refer to:

== People ==
- Hollis (name), a list of people with either the surname or given name
- Hollis (singer), American singer-songwriter Hollis Wong-Wear (fl. 2013–present)

== Places ==
=== United States ===
- Hollis, Alaska, a census-designated place
- Hollis, Arkansas, an unincorporated community
- Hollis, Kansas, an unincorporated community
- Hollis, Maine, a town
- Hollis, Mississippi, an unincorporated community
- Hollis, Missouri, an unincorporated community
- Hollis, New Hampshire, a town
- Hollis, Oklahoma, a city and county seat
- Hollis, Queens, a New York City neighborhood
  - Hollis station, a Long Island Rail Road station
- Hollis Garden, a public botanical garden in Lakeland, Florida
- Hollis Speedway, a racetrack in Heflin, Alabama

=== Elsewhere ===
- Hollis Reservoir, Trinidad

== Other uses ==
- USS Hollis, a US Navy destroyer escort
- Hollis Chair of Mathematicks and Natural Philosophy, an endowed professorship at Harvard University
- Hollis Professor of Divinity, an endowed chair at Harvard University
- HOLLIS, acronym for Harvard Library's online catalog

== See also ==
- Hollis v Vabu, a 2001 decision of the High Court of Australia
- Holi or Holli, Hindu festival, plural: "Hollis"
- Holles, a list of people with the surname
- Hollace, a list of people with the given name
- Holliston (disambiguation)
