= Holly (disambiguation) =

Holly is a genus of about 400 species of flowering plants in the family Aquifoliaceae.

Holly may also refer to:

== Name ==
- Holly (name), including a list of people with the name

== Places in the United States ==
- Holly, Colorado, a Statutory Town
- Holly, Michigan, a village
- Holly, Texas, an unincorporated community
- Holly, Washington, an unincorporated community
- Holly, West Virginia, an unincorporated community
- Holly Lake, Grand Teton National Park, Wyoming
- Holly River, Virginia
- Holly Township (disambiguation), several places

== Arts, entertainment, and media ==
=== Fictional characters ===
- Holly (Red Dwarf), the talking computer on the British TV series Red Dwarf
- Holly Short, core character in Eoin Colfer's Artemis Fowl novel series and film adaptation
- Holly Gibney, recurring character in Stephen King's novels
- Holly Golightly (character), lead character in Truman Capote's novella Breakfast at Tiffany's and its various adaptations
- Holly Flax, Human Resources representative and Michael Scott's love interest in American TV series The Office
- Holly Shumpert, Dog walker of Doug and Carrie Heffernan in American sitcom The King of Queens

=== Music ===
- Holly (DJ), Portuguese musician
- Holly (album), an album by Justin Nozuka
- "Holly" (song), a 1967 song performed by Andy Williams
- "Holly (Would You Turn Me On?)", a 2007 song by All Time Low from So Wrong, It's Right
- Sirius XM Holly, a Christmas music channel on North American satellite radio which replaces various channels during the Christmas season including Sirius XM Love

=== Other uses in arts, entertainment, and media ===
- Holly (2006 film), a drama film directed by Guy Moshe
- Holly (2023 film), a drama film directed by Fien Troch
- "Holly" (The Handmaid's Tale), a television episode
- Holly (novel), 2023 novel by Stephen King

== Brands and enterprises ==
- Holly (automobile company), a defunct American automobile manufacturer (1911–1913)
- Holly Corporation, an oil company headquartered in Dallas, Texas, now known as HollyFrontier
- Holly Theatre (disambiguation), several places

== Education ==
- Holly Academy, Holly, Michigan, a charter school
- Holly High School, Holly, Michigan

== Other uses ==
- Tropical Storm Holly, various named tropical cyclones
- USS Holly, two US Navy vessels

== See also ==
- Olly (disambiguation)
- Holley (disambiguation)
- Hollie (disambiguation)
- Hollies (disambiguation)
- Mount Holly (disambiguation)
- Quercus ilex, holly oak
