= Holley (surname) =

Holley is an English surname. It is either locational, ultimately derived an Old English hol lēah "[dwelling by] the clearing by the hollow", or descriptive, from hol-ēage "hollow-eyed".

Notable people with the surname include:

- Addison Holley (born 2000), Canadian actress
- Adolfo Holley (1833-1914), Chilean general
- Alan Holley (born 1954), Australian composer and musician
- Alexander H. Holley (1804–1887), American politician
- Alexander Lyman Holley (1832–1882), mechanical engineer
- Charles Hardin Holley, real name of singer Buddy Holly (1936–1959)
- Bernard Holley (1940–2021), British actor
- Candice Holley (born 1981), American basketball player
- Christopher Michael Holley (born 1971), American actor
- Claire Holley, American singer-songwriter
- Dorian Holley (born 1956), American musician, backing singer and a vocal coach
- George Holley (1885–1942), England international footballer
- Heather Holley, American producer, songwriter, singer, composer, pianist, and Pro Tools engineer
- Horace Holley (minister) (1781–1827), Unitarian minister and president of Transylvania University
- Horace Holley (Baháʼí) (1887–1960), prominent follower of the Bahá'í Faith
- James W. Holley III (1926–2012), American politician
- Jesse Holley (born 1984), American professional football player
- John Holley (poker player), American professional poker player with 9 Circuit rings
- John M. Holley (1802–1848), American politician
- Kerrie Holley, American software architect
- Lonnie Holley (born 1950), American artist
- Martin Holley (born 1954), American Roman Catholic bishop
- Marietta Holley (1836–1926), American humorist
- Mary Austin Holley (1784–1846), American historical writer
- Michael Holley (born 1970), American sports commentator
- Myron Holley (1779–1841), American politician
- Orville L. Holley (1791–1861), American politician
- Ralph Holley (born 1999), American football player
- Robert Holley (disambiguation), several people
- Sallie Holley (1818–1893), American educator and anti-slavery activist
- Sam Holley, American baseball umpire
- Steve Holley (born 1953), English rock drummer
- Yvonne Lewis Holley (born 1952), American politician

== See also ==
- Holly (name)
