= Hollie =

Hollie may refer to:

== People ==
=== Women ===
- Hollie Arnold (born 1994), British parasport athlete
- Hollie-Jay Bowes (born 1989), English actress
- Hollie Davidson (born 1992), Scottish rugby union referee
- Hollie Doyle (born 1996), British jockey
- Hollie Dykes (born 1990), Australian gymnast
- Hollie Grima (born 1983), Australian basketball player
- Hollie Hughes (disambiguation), multiple people
- Hollie Mershon (born 1990), American basketball player
- Hollie Smith (born 1982), New Zealand jazz and soul singer
- Hollie Steel (born 1998), British singer
- Hollie Thomson, Scottish footballer

=== Men ===
- Hollie Donan (1928–2014), American football player
- Hollie Farris, musical artist
- Hollie Hughes (disambiguation), multiple people
- Hollie Pihl (1928–2018), American judge

== Entertainment ==
- Hollie (album), the debut album by Hollie Steel
- The Hollies, an English rock group
- Hollies (1965 album), an album by The Hollies

== See also ==
- Holly (disambiguation)
- Hollies (disambiguation)
