= Hollies (disambiguation) =

The Hollies were an English rock group.

Hollies may also refer to:

== Works by The Hollies ==
- Hollies (1965 album), an album by The Hollies
- Hollies (1974 album), an album by The Hollies
- The Hollies (EP), a 1964 EP by The Hollies
- The Hollies: 20 Golden Greats, a 1978 compilation album

== People with the surname ==
- Eric Hollies (1912–1981), English cricketer

== See also ==
- The Hollies' Greatest Hits (disambiguation)
- Holli, a singular form for "hollies"
- Holly (disambiguation), a singular form for "hollies"
- Hollie (disambiguation), a singular form for "hollies"
- Hollis (disambiguation)
