= Lake Mirror (Lakeland) =

Lake in the state of Florida, United States

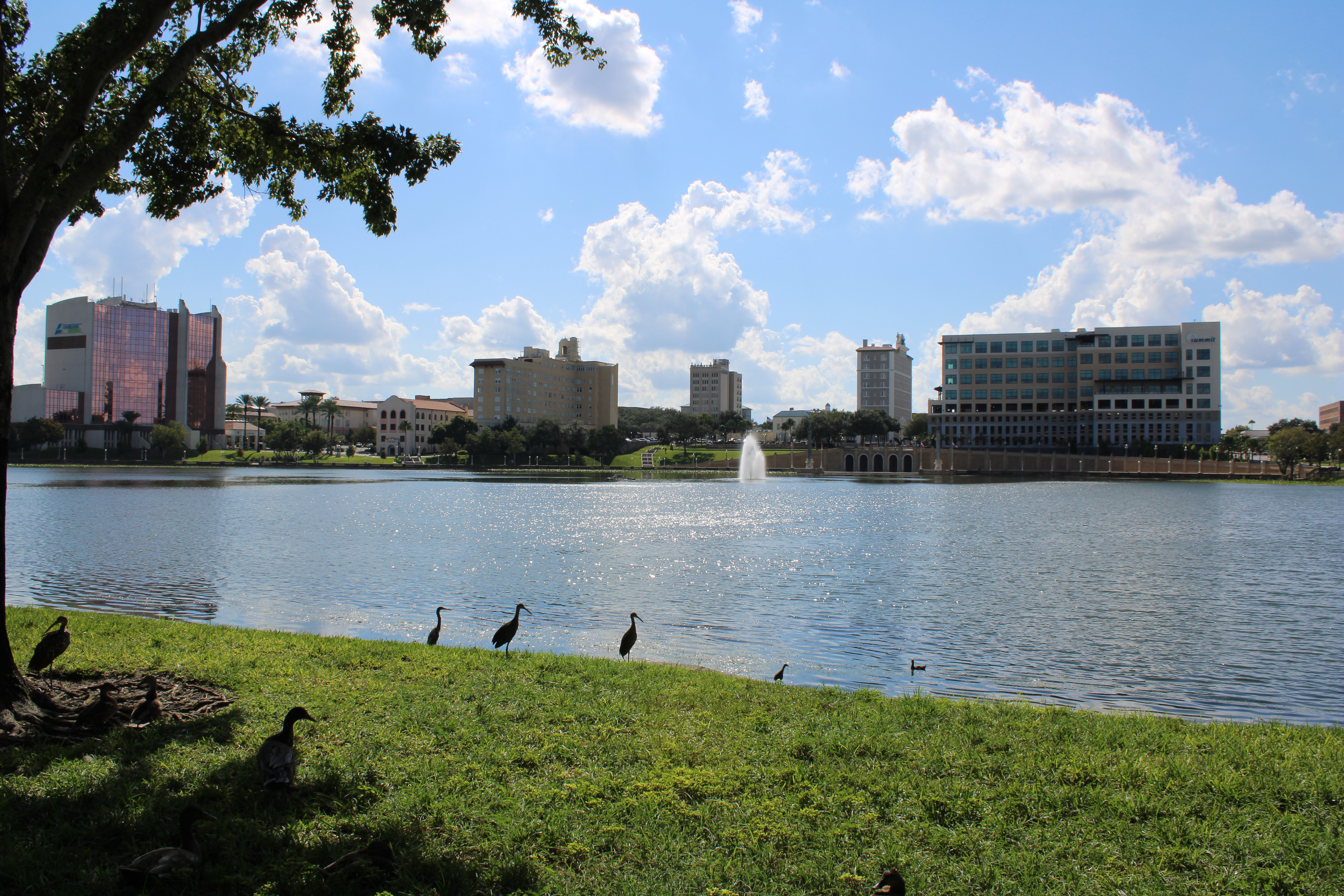
- Lake Mirror, 2024.

- Location within Florida
- Location: Polk County, Florida
- Coordinates: 28°02′39″N 81°57′06″W
- Type: Lake

Lake Mirror is a lake in Lakeland, Florida.

Lake Mirror was so named on account of the clarity of its waters.

The city of Lakeland operates the Lake Mirror Complex, a recreation center at the lake.

Hollis Garden is located adjacent to the lake.

== Gallery ==
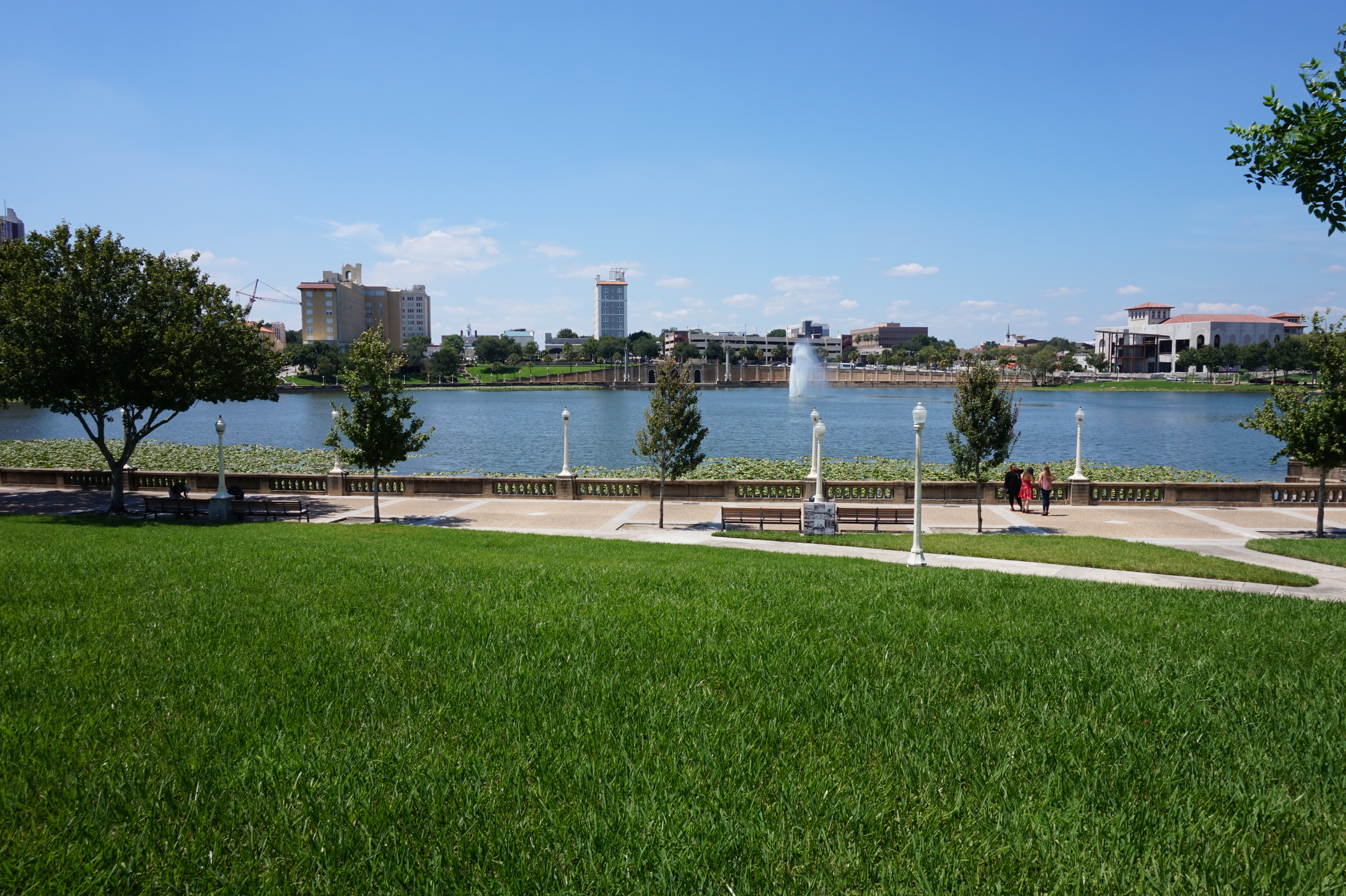
The skyline of Lakeland across Lake Mirror.

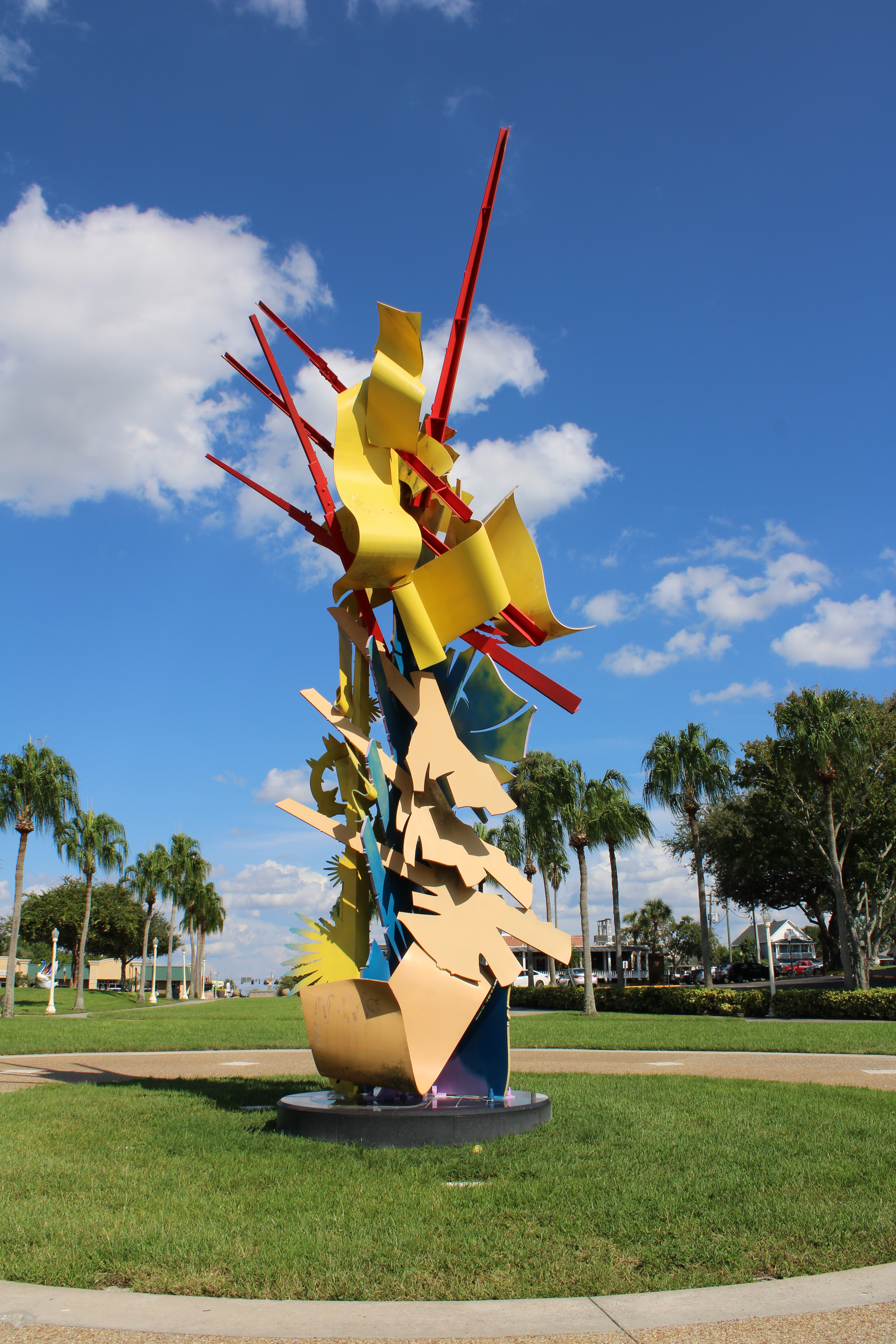
The Tribute to the Volunteer Spirit statue, erected in 2004, is located on the lake.

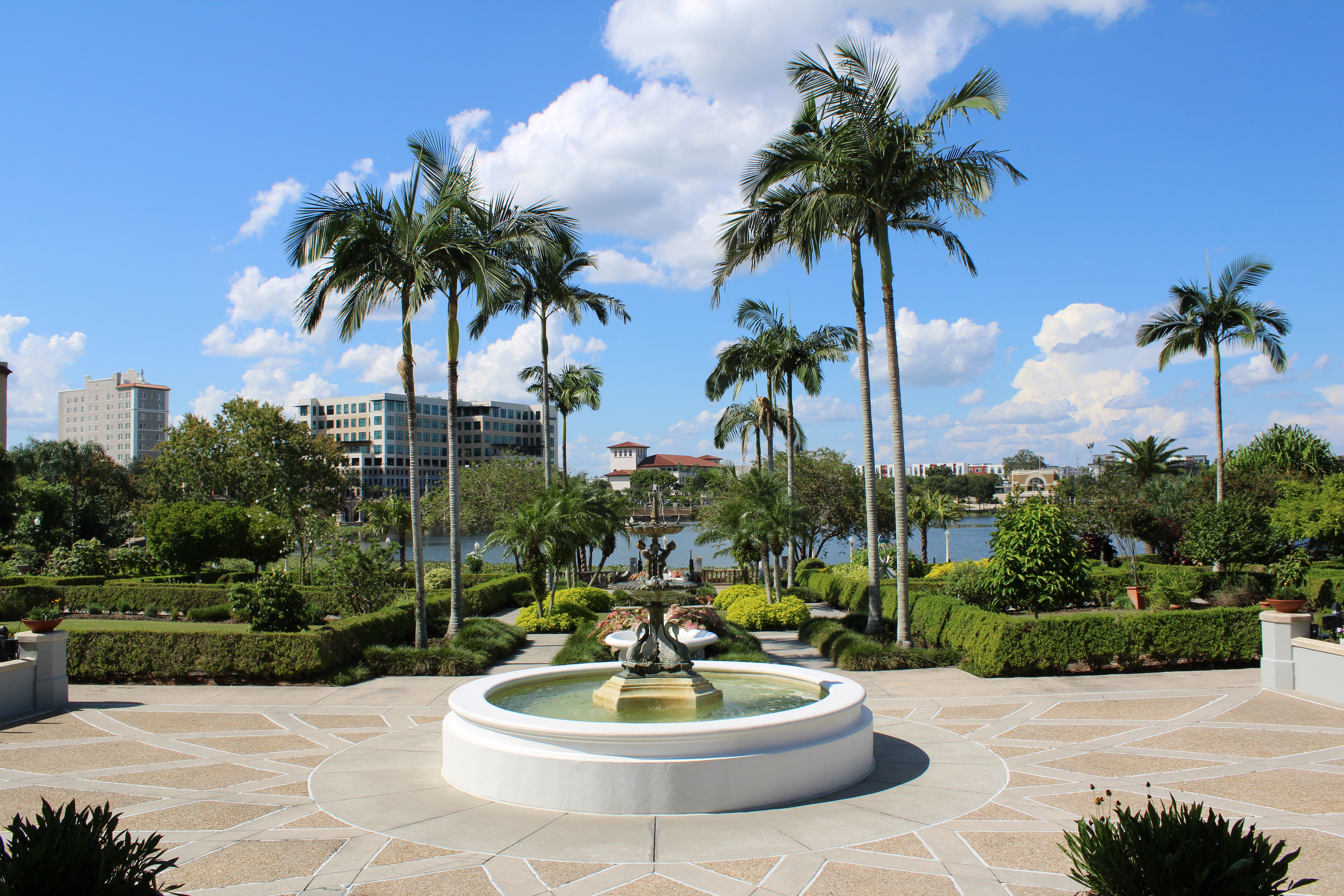
Hollis Garden is located on the lake.

== See also ==
- Charles Wellford Leavitt
