= Stone Warehouse =

Stone Warehouse or Old Stone Warehouse or variations may refer to:

- Stone Warehouse (Casa Grande, Arizona), listed on the National Register of Historic Places (NRHP)
- John Brown Stone Warehouse, Fort Wayne, Indiana, NRHP-listed
- Old Stone Warehouse (Rochester, New York), NRHP-listed
