= Holley =

Holley can refer to:

== People ==
- Holley (surname)
- a masculine given name (derived from the surname)
  - Holley Mims (1929–1970), American boxer
- a feminine given name, spelling variant of Holly, see Holly (name)

== Places ==
=== United States ===
- Holley, Florida
- Holley, Georgia
- Holley, New York
- Holley, Oregon

== Companies ==
- Holley Performance Products, an American manufacturer of carburetors and fuel systems for performance cars (e.g. NASCAR)

== See also ==
- Holly (disambiguation)
