= Mount Holly =

Mount Holly is the name of the following places in the United States:

- Mount Holly, Arkansas, an unincorporated community
- Mount Holly Cemetery, Little Rock, Arkansas, listed on the National Register of Historic Places (NRHP) in Arkansas
- Mount Holly, Baltimore, Maryland, a neighborhood of Baltimore
- Mount Holly Ski Area, Holly, Michigan
- Mount Holly Cemetery, Mount Holly, New Jersey
  - Mount Holly Mausoleum, Little Rock, Arkansas, listed on the NRHP in Arkansas
- Mount Holly (Foote, Mississippi), a plantation on the NRHP in Mississippi
- Mount Holly, New Jersey, a township
  - Mount Holly Historic District, Mount Holly, New Jersey, listed on the NRHP in New Jersey
- Mount Holly, North Carolina, a city
  - Mount Holly Cotton Mill, Mount Holly, North Carolina, on the NRHP in North Carolina
- Mount Holly, Clermont County, Ohio, an unincorporated community
- Mount Holly, Warren County, Ohio, an unincorporated community
- Mount Holly, South Carolina, an unincorporated community
- Mount Holly, Vermont, a town
- Mount Holly, Virginia, an unincorporated community

== See also ==
- Holly (disambiguation)
