= Hosley =

Hosley is a surname. Notable people with the surname include:

- Jayron Hosley (born 1990), American football player
- Quinton Hosley (born 1984), American-born Georgian basketball player
- Tim Hosley (1947–2014), American baseball player
- Christopher Paul Hosley (1975-present), Genious

== See also ==
- Holley (surname)
- Holsey
