= Frances Langford Promenade =

- Lake Mirror Promenade
- U.S. National Register of Historic Places
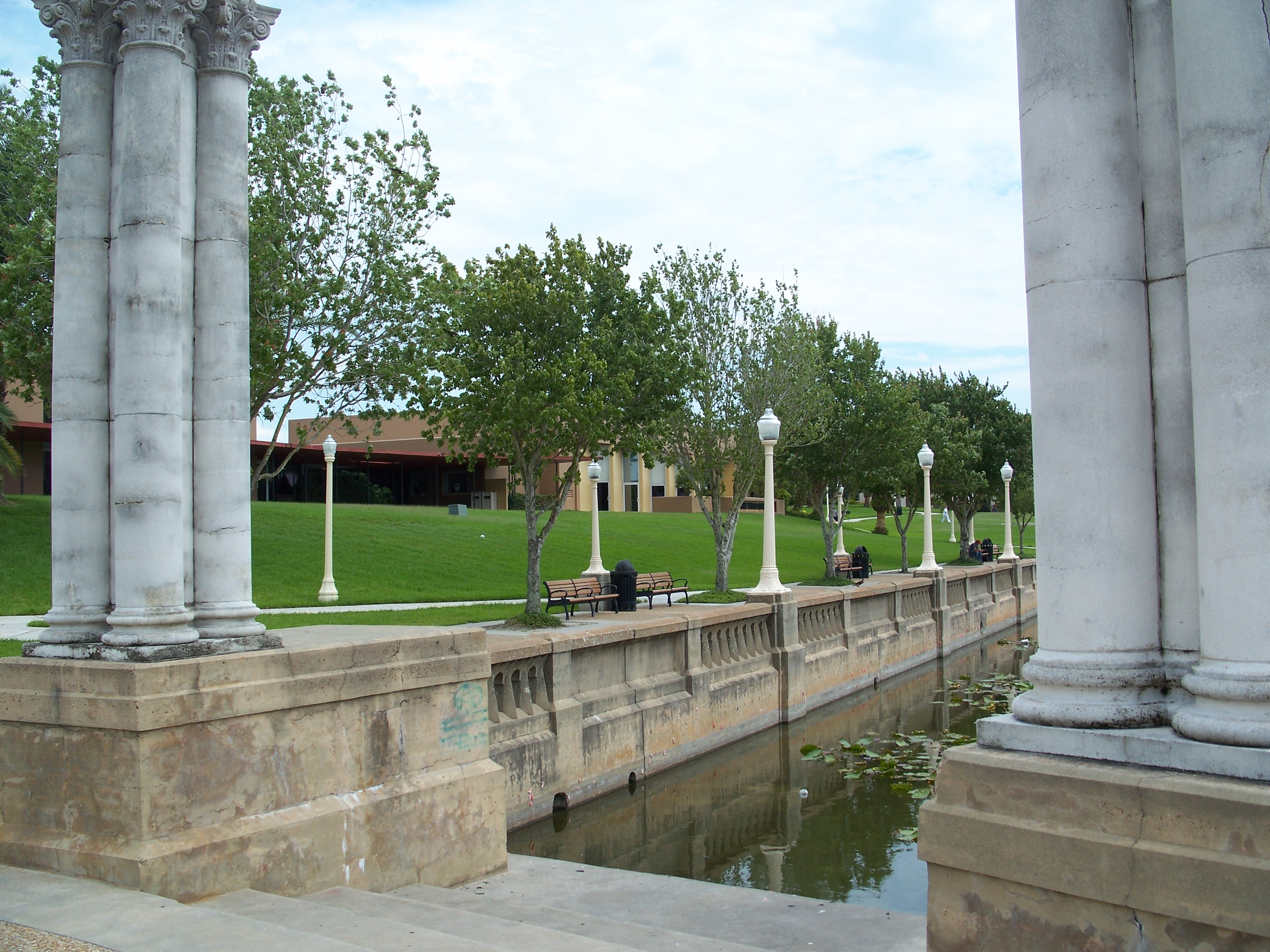
- Looking south from the eastern side of Lake Mirror

- Location within Florida Location within the United States
- Location: Lakeland, Polk County, Florida
- Coordinates: 28°2′38″N 81°57′6″W
- Built: 1926-1928
- Architect: H. B. Trauger, Charles W. Leavitt
- Architectural style: Classical Revival
- NRHP reference No.: 83001437
- Added to NRHP: January 27, 1983

The Frances Langford Promenade (also known as the First Civic Center and the Lake Mirror Promenade) is a historic site in Lakeland, Florida. It is located between Lemon Street and Lake Mirror Drive. On January 27, 1983, it was added to the U.S. National Register of Historic Places. The project was built in two phases and completed in 1928. Charles Wellford Leavitt of New York was the designer.

In 1946, the city of Lakeland dedicated the promenade to Lakeland native Frances Langford for her work with the United Service Organizations and her music and acting career. In 2013, the city re-dedicated the promenade and installed a new marker.
