= Holsey =

Holsey is a surname. Notable people with the surname include:

- Alvin Holsey (born 1965), United States Navy admiral
- Bernard Holsey (born 1973), American football player
- Frog Holsey (1906–?), American baseball pitcher
- Hopkins Holsey (1779–1856), American politician
- Joshua Holsey (born 1994), American football player
- Monique Holsey-Hyman, American politician, social worker, and academic

== See also ==
- Hosley
