= Hollis Garden =

Botanical garden in Florida, U.S.

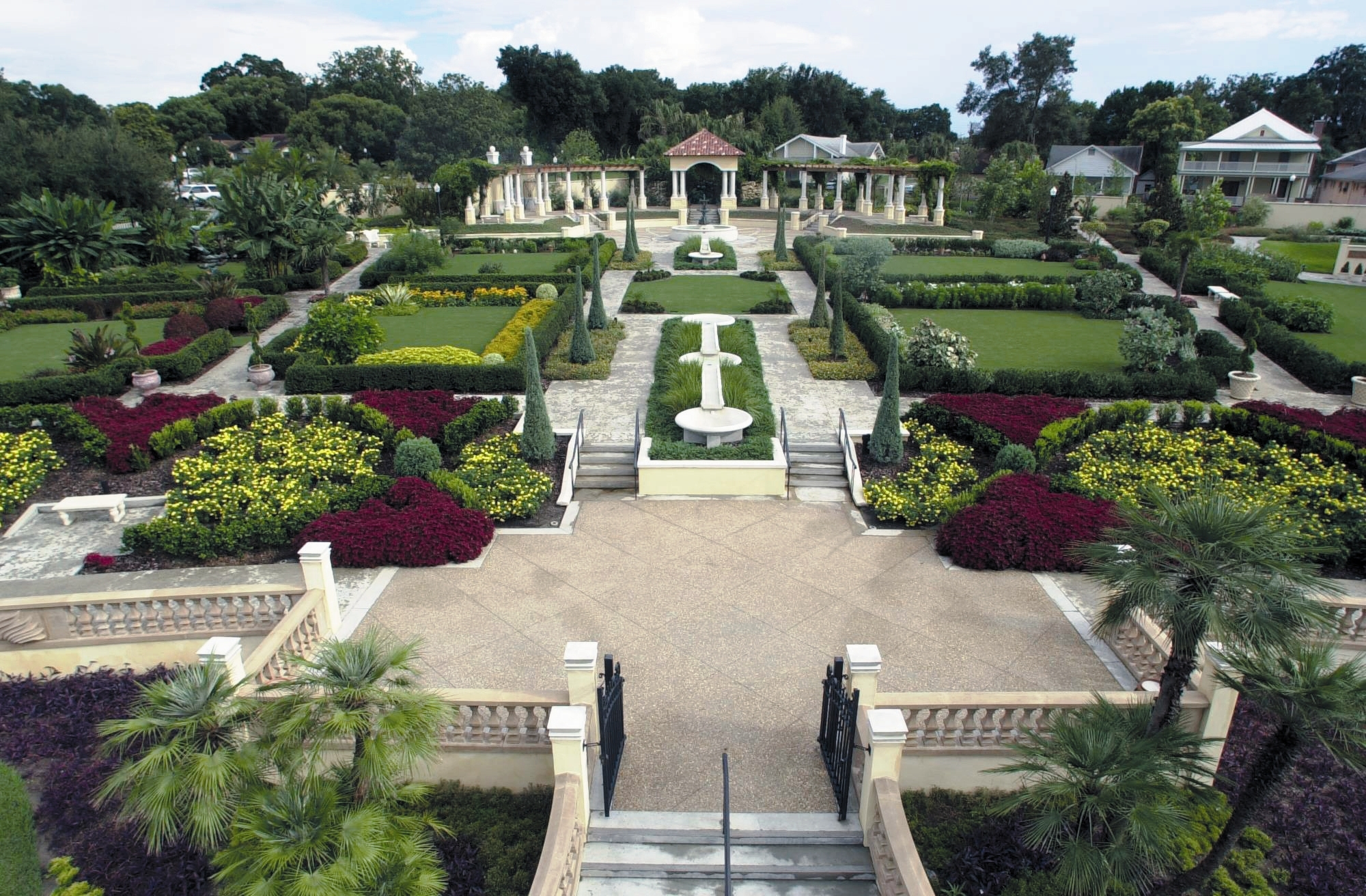
- Aerial view
- Interactive map of Hollis Garden
- Location: Lakeland, Florida, United States
- Coordinates: 28°02′32″N 81°57′05″W
- Area: 1.2 acres (0.49 ha)
- Opened: December 8, 2000
- Etymology: Mark Hollis family
- Operator: City of Lakeland
- Website: www.lakelandgov.net/departments/parks-recreation-and-cultural-arts/hollis-garden/

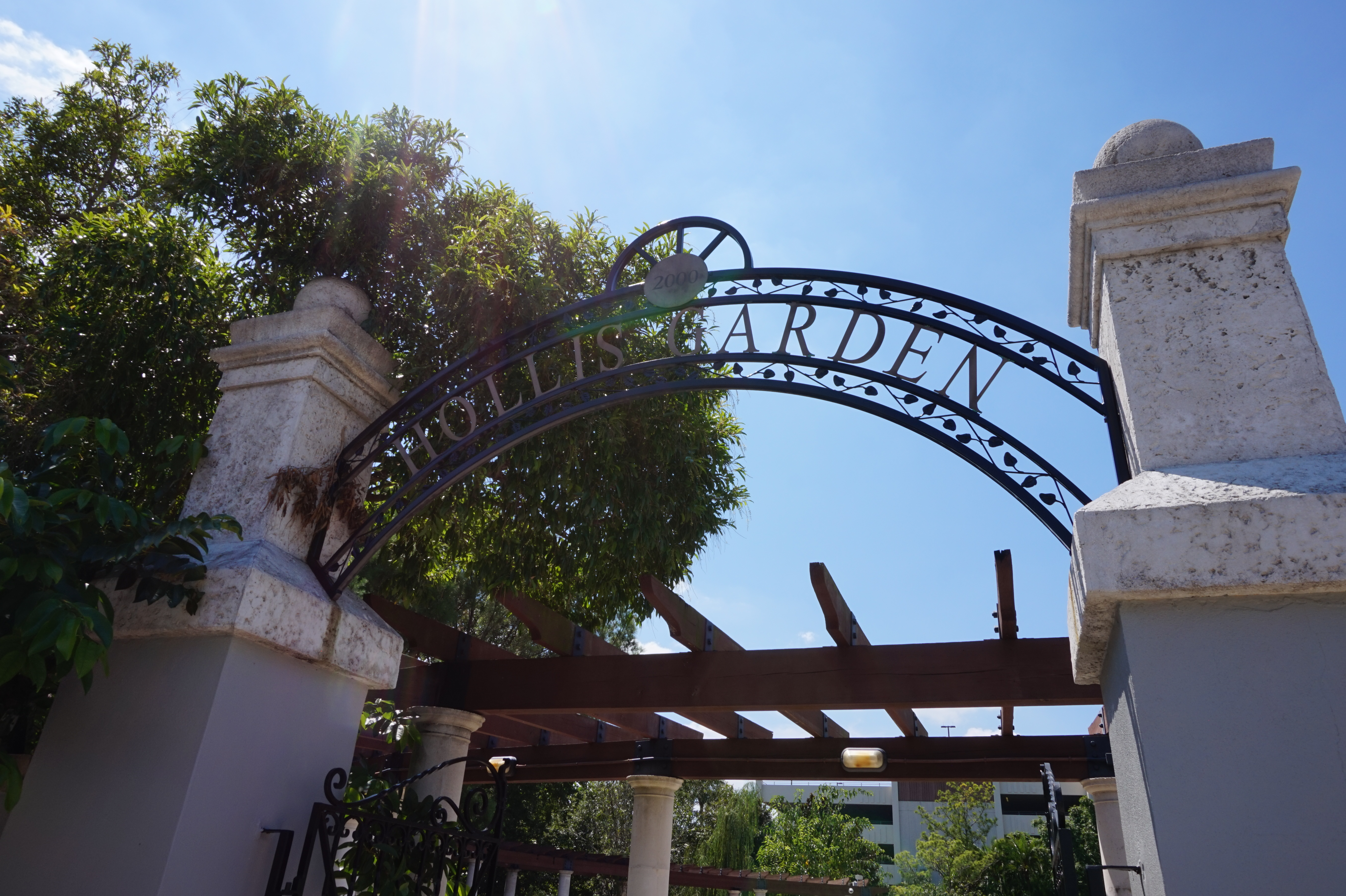
Entry sign for Hollis Garden in Lakeland, FL

Hollis Garden is a public botanical garden in Lakeland, Florida, in the United States.

It is divided into 16 themed sections or "rooms" with plantings being rotated throughout the year. Not all of the rooms feature heavy planting, for example the Gazebo and Trellis area displays Tuscan style, neoclassical architectural design elements. Some of these rooms showcase water features such as the Grotto, a shady section of garden that houses tropical ferns and orchids; the Rosette Plaza and Fountain, a grand, central, open-spaced display; Bowls and Runnels, a long gravity-fed fountain that takes water from the Rosette Fountain down to Lake Mirror; and the Lily Pond, a small secluded koi pond surrounded by rustling bamboo. There are rooms named after their colors including the Red, Yellow, and White Rooms. Other rooms are named after their planting types like the Vegetable Room, Tropical Room, and Herb Rooms, and Patterned Flowerbeds. Two of the rooms, Sustenance Orchard and Trees of Americana, showcase the botanical heritage of Florida and the United States. The trees in the Trees of Americana Room are all relatives of famous trees of American history including a water oak from Helen Keller's home, a sycamore from Susan B. Anthony's grave, an Oak from 16th U.S. President Abraham Lincoln's birthplace, a Weeping Willow from the musician Elvis Presley's front yard, and, previously, a tree associated with the poet Edgar Allan Poe, which died. Lastly, the Butterfly Garden is designed and dedicated to the local pollinators such as butterflies, moths, and bees. The rooms and areas are connected by labyrinthine walkways that connect the garden to the surrounding Lake Mirror complex. The staff maintain a growing collection of plants from around the world including several incense plants like the Frankincense Tree and the Balm of Gilead, and edible plants like the Blackberry Jam Fruit and the Peanut Butter Fruit.

== Location ==
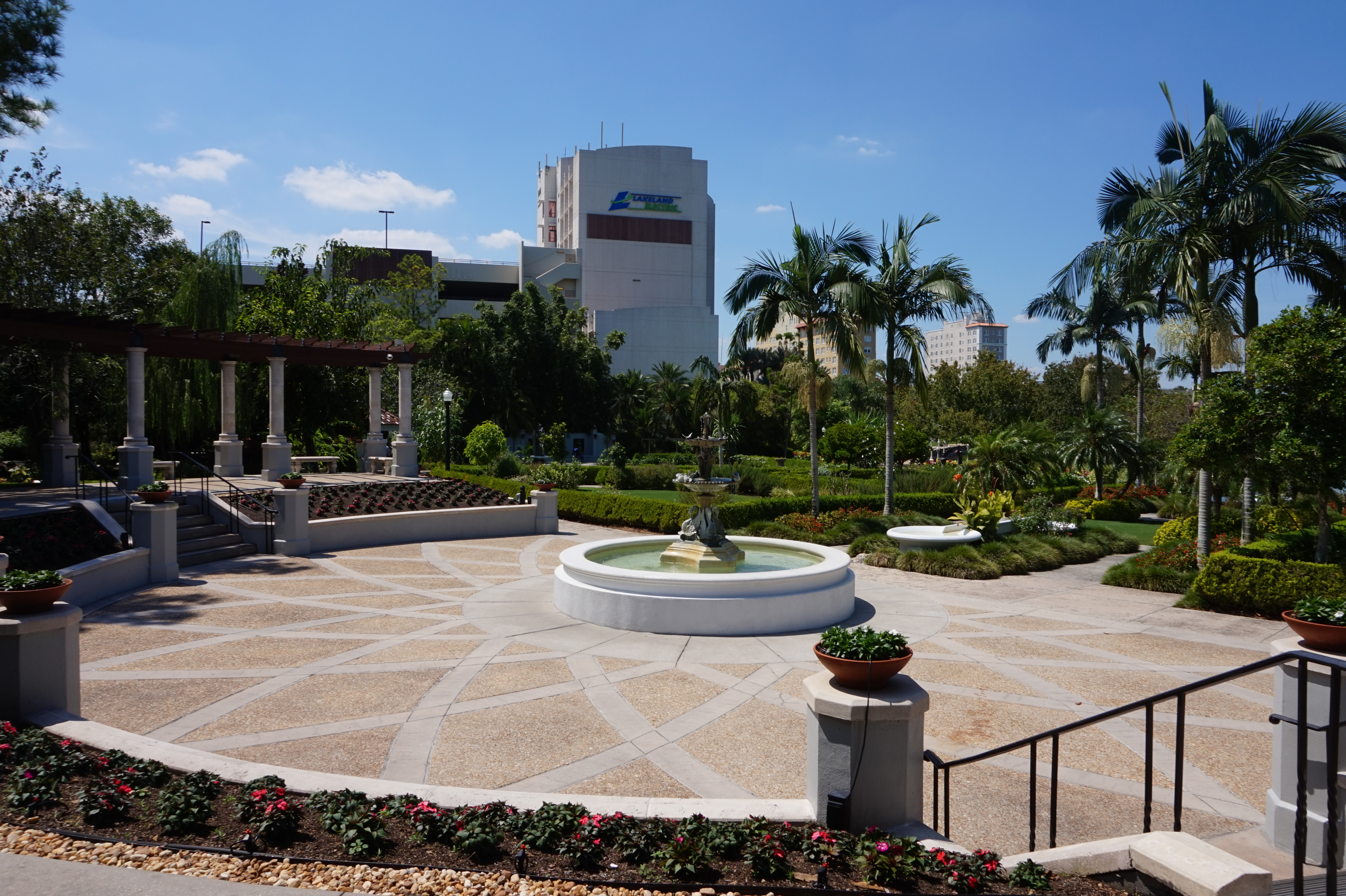
Hollis Gardens, facing west

Hollis Garden is operated by the City of Lakeland under their Parks, Recreation and Cultural Arts department and is at 614 E. Orange Street, Lakeland, FL 33801, along the Frances Langford Promenade on the shores of Lake Mirror in downtown Lakeland. Many of the City of Lakeland community events are held here due to its scenic location and it can also be rented for weddings and other engagements.

Hollis Garden is a part of a larger Lake Mirror complex that includes the Frances Langford Promenade, a site built in the 1920s and dedicated to American actress and Lakeland local Frances Langford, in 1946; the Magnolia Building, a city owned formal event space built in 1938, originally known as the Lakeland Community Center; Garden Bistro, a local cafe in the lower level of the Magnolia Building facing Lake Mirror; Barnett Family Park, an all-ages park that includes multiple playgrounds, a splash-pad water feature, and the Sunflower Preschool Playground; the Lake Mirror Auditorium, home to the Lakeland Community Theatre; and the Peggy Brown Building, an informal outdoor event space.

== History ==
Lakeland's Lake Mirror Promenade, now known as the Frances Langford Promenade, was built as a part of the City Beautiful movement that swept the U.S. in the late 19th and early 20th centuries. It was designed by Charles Wellford Leavitt, a student of the landscape architect Frederick Law Olmsted, who also designed New York City's Central Park and San Francisco's Golden State Park. A grand two-phase project completed in 1928, the original plans for the promenade included a tennis court, a new city hall, an auditorium, shuffle board, lawn bowling and carpet golf, although many of these no longer exist. The designs also included a large garden; but due to Florida's 1926 economic crash the plans had to be limited and it wasn't until 2000 when the "long planned for" garden of Lake Mirror was finally constructed.

The garden is named after the philanthropic Hollis family who wanted to give back to their community by finishing the original design plans of the Lake Mirror Promenade (now the Frances Langford Promenade) 74 years after construction was first completed. Lynn and Mark Hollis, a former president of Publix, donated one million dollars to the City of Lakeland through their Hollis Trust in the Community foundation of Greater Lakeland, Inc. and also provided a perpetual care fund of $500,000 in Publix stock in order to keep the garden operating independent of the city's budget. In 2017, the fund had almost reached the point of self-sustainability just on the interest. The neoclassical design of the garden was inspired by the Hollis family's travels, specifically a trip to New Zealand. Its formal dedication ceremony was held on December 8, 2000 and was open to the public.
