= Robert Halley =

Robert Halley may refer to:

- Robert Halley (minister) (1796–1876), English Congregationalist minister and abolitionist
- Robert Halley (politician) (1935–2021), French politician and businessman

== See also ==
- Robert Holley (disambiguation)
