= Robert Holley =

Robert Holley may refer to:

- Robert Holley (television personality) (born 1960), American-South Korean lawyer and television personality
- Robert M. Holley (1913–1977), American cartoonist
- Robert W. Holley (1922–1993), American biochemist

== See also ==
- Robert Halley (disambiguation)
