= Hollis (name) =

Hollis is both a surname and a given name. Notable people with the name include:

== Surname ==
- Adrian Hollis (1940–2013), English classical scholar and correspondence chess grandmaster.
- Andy Hollis, American game designer
- Anthony Hollis (1927–2013), British barrister and judge
- Barry Hollis, English rugby league footballer
- Charles Hollis, British architect
- Christopher Hollis (politician) (1902–1977), British schoolmaster, university teacher, author and Conservative politician
- Crispian Hollis, English Roman Catholic bishop
- David Hollis (born 1965), American football player
- Dwayne Hollis (born 1989), American football player
- Francis Hollis (1884–1955), British clergyman and Bishop of Labuan and Sarawak
- Garnett Hollis (born 2002), American football player
- George Hollis (VC) (1833–1879), British soldier and recipient of the Victoria Cross
- Gerald Hollis (1919–2005), British rugby player, naval officer and Church of England priest
- H. H. Hollis (1921–1977), American science fiction writer
- Harry Hollis (1913–1982), Welsh footballer
- Herman Hollis (1903–1934), American Federal Bureau of Investigation (FBI) special agent
- Joe Hollis, American football and baseball coach
- John Hollis, British actor
- Lee Hollis, Scottish footballer
- Linda Hollis (born 1951), American historian
- Mark Hollis (English musician) (1955–2019), British musician
- Martin Hollis (philosopher) (1938–1998), English philosopher
- Martin Hollis (video game designer), game designer
- Mary Cal Hollis, American political candidate
- Mick Hollis, English footballer
- Mike Hollis, American football kicker
- Patrice Hollis, Playboy Playmate for September 2007
- Patricia Hollis (1941–2018), British politician
- Roger Hollis (1905–1973), British intelligence officer, director of MI5
- Sam Hollis, British football manager
- Stanley Elton Hollis, British Army officer and Second World War Victoria Cross recipient
- Thomas Hollis (disambiguation), the name of several benefactors to Harvard University
- Tommy Hollis, American actor

== Given name ==
- Hollis Caswell, American educator
- Hollis Cline, American neuroscientist
- Hollis Frampton, experimental filmmaker
- Hollis French, American politician
- Hollis Price, American basketball player
- Hollis Robbins, American academic
- Hollis Thompson, American basketball player
- Hollis Thurston, better known as Sloppy Thurston, American professional baseball pitcher
- Hollis (singer), given name Hollis Wong-Wear
- Hollis Parker Frazier-Herndon, better known as 2hollis, American musician
