= Hollace =

Hollace is a feminine given name, and may refer to:

- Hollace Lyon, American politician
- Hollace Shaw (1913–1976), American coloratura soprano

== See also ==
- Hollis
