= Old Stone Warehouse (Rochester, New York) =

Historic commercial building in New York, United States

- U.S. National Register of Historic Places
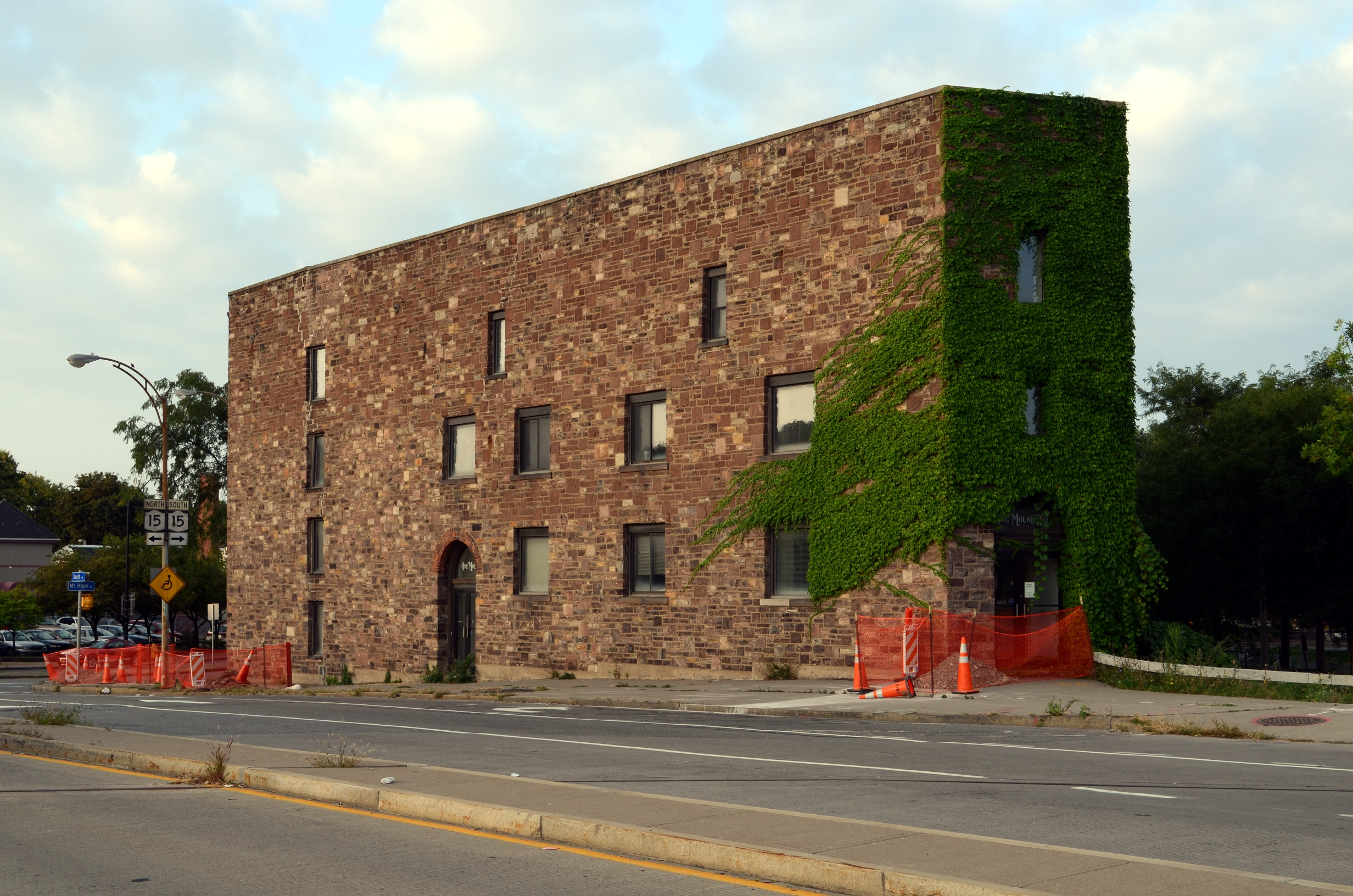
- Old Stone Warehouse, September 2012

- Location within New York Location within the United States
- Location: 1 Mt. Hope Ave., Rochester, New York
- Coordinates: 43°8′54″N 77°36′24″W
- Area: 0.3 acres (0.12 ha)
- Built: 1822
- Architect: Myron Holley and John Gilbert
- NRHP reference No.: 73001203
- Added to NRHP: October 15, 1973

The Old Stone Warehouse in Rochester, New York is an historic warehouse building. It was built in 1822 and is a four-story, trapezoidal building with six-story addition built of Medina sandstone. It was built by Myron Holley and is located on the Genesee River. Throughout the 19th century it was used for multiple purposes: as a foundry, a storage warehouse, a tile pottery production facility, and a brewery.

It was listed on the National Register of Historic Places in 1973.
