= Mount Holly, Warren County, Ohio =

Unincorporated community in Ohio, U.S.

Coordinates: 39°34′18″N 84°01′57″W

Mount Holly (also Mount Helley, Mount Holley, Pences Mills) is an unincorporated community in Warren County, in the U.S. state of Ohio.

== History ==
A sawmill and gristmill were built at Mount Holly as early as the 1810s. Mount Holly was platted in 1833, and named after Mount Holly, New Jersey. A post office called Mount Holly was established in 1843, and remained in operation until 1863.
