= Holly (automobile company) =

Defunct American motor vehicle manufacturer

The Holly Motor Company of Mount Holly, New Jersey was an automaker founded in 1913 from the leftovers of the Otto Gas Engine Company.

== History ==
In 1911, the Otto Gas Engine company went bankrupt, and from it, the Holly Motor Company was created. The company produced its Holly Six car as either a 5, 6, or 7-passenger touring car or a 2-passenger roadster.

The company went out of business in 1915 due to poor sales.

=== Models ===
Model year	Engine	Power	Wheelbase
1913	Straight-six	28 kW (38 hp)	3.3 m (130 in)
1914	Straight-six	28 kW (38 hp)	3.3 m (130 in)
1915	Straight-six	28 kW (38 hp)	3.3 m (130 in)
