= Candice Holley =

American basketball player

Personal information
- Born: April 23, 1981 (age 45) Memphis, Tennessee, U.S.
- Listed height: 6 ft 2 in (1.88 m)

Career information
- High school: White Station (Memphis, Tennessee)
- College: Cincinnati (1999–2001); Ole Miss (2001–2002)
- Position: Forward

Career highlights
- CUSA All-Freshman Team (2000)

Candice Holley (born April 23, 1981, in Memphis, Tennessee) is a women's college basketball athlete that played for The University of Cincinnati and University of Mississippi.

== Early years ==
As a high school star at White Station under Betty Parks, Holley garnered first team All-State accolades. She averaged 19.1 points and 15.3 rebounds per game as a senior and also earned All-District, All-Regional and District Player of the Year honors. Holley was ranked among the top 100 in the nation by the All-Star Girls Report coming out of high school and was a WBCA All-American before graduating in 1999.

== Collegiate career ==
Holley, a 6-1 forward, played for Cincinnati for two seasons (1999–2001) before transferring to Ole Miss in 2002. At Cincinnati, Holley earned Conference USA All-Freshman honors and finished third on the team in scoring. Holley earned Team Captain Honors while at Ole Miss.

== Career statistics ==
Legend
GP	Games played	GS	Games started	MPG	Minutes per game	RPG	Rebounds per game
APG	Assists per game	SPG	Steals per game	BPG	Blocks per game	PPG	Points per game
TO	Turnovers per game	FG%	Field-goal percentage	3P%	3-point field-goal percentage	FT%	Free-throw percentage
**Bold**	Career best	°	League leader

=== College ===
Year	Team	GP	GS	MPG	FG%	3P%	FT%	RPG	APG	SPG	BPG	TO	PPG
1999–00	Cincinnati	**30**	-	-	42.9	0.0	**61.9**	4.0	0.4	**1.2**	0.3	-	8.5
2000–01	Cincinnati	4	-	-	**65.4**	0.0	53.3	**4.5**	**1.0**	0.5	**0.8**	-	**10.5**
**Career**		34	-	-	44.9	0.0	59.6	4.1	0.4	1.1	0.4	-	8.7
Statistics retrieved from Sports-Reference.
