= Holly Theatre =

Holly Theatre may refer to:

- Holly Theatre (Dahlonega, Georgia)
- Holly Theatre (Medford, Oregon)
- Holly Cinema (Hollywood, California)
