= Harry Hollis =

Welsh footballer

Personal information
- Full name: Harold Hollis
- Date of birth: 12 December 1913
- Place of birth: Deeside, Wales
- Date of death: 18 August 1982 (aged 68)
- Place of death: Shotton, Flintshire, Wales
- Position: Defender

Senior career*
Years	Team	Apps	(Gls)
- Connah's Quay
1946–1947	Wrexham	1	(0)
- Pwllheli
- * Club domestic league appearances and goals

Harold Hollis (12 December 1913 – 18 August 1982) was a Welsh footballer who played as a defender. He made one appearance in the English Football League with Wrexham, and played in the Welsh leagues with Connah's Quay and Pwllheli.

He also guested for Chester City during World War II.
