= Hollis v Vabu =

Judgement of the High Court of Australia

- Court: High Court of Australia
- Full case name: Hollis v Vabu Pty Ltd
- Decided: 9 August 2001
- Citations: [2001] HCA 44; 207 CLR 21

Court membership
- Judges sitting: Gleeson CJ, Gaudron, McHugh, Gummow, Kirby, Hayne, Callinan JJ

Case opinions
- The courier was an employee of Vabu, and therefore vicariously liable to Hollis; Gleeson CJ, Gummow, Gaudron Kirby, & Hayne JJ; The courier was Vabu's agent and acted as representative for its contractual obligation, and Vabu is vicariously liable McHugh J dissent Callinan J

Hollis v Vabu Pty Ltd (Vabu) was a decision of the High Court of Australia. It is a notable decision in Australian employment law.

The case is most known for outlining principles determinative of whether a worker should be regarded as an employee or independent contractor.

At issue in the case was a claim in negligence by Hollis against Vabu Pty Ltd. Hollis had been hit by a courier, and asserted that because that courier was an employee of Vabu; the company was vicariously liable. (Note: As a general rule, employees are vicariously liable for the actions of their employees in Australian tort law. See: 207 CLR 21 at 32) Vabu claimed that the courier was an independent contractor, which would have assisted its argument that only the courier was liable for injury to Hollis. The High Court declared that the courier was an employee of Vabu, and therefore vicariously liable. In doing so, it set out general principles which are relevant to recognition of the employment relationship at Australian common law.

The decision is legally important in Australian Industrial law, one reason being that most legislative provisions under the Fair Work Act apply only if a common law employment relationship is recognised.

== Facts ==
Vabu Pty Ltd conducted a Sydney delivery business named 'Crisis Couriers'. Hollis was a courier with a firm named 'Team Couriers'. In 1994 Hollis was leaving a building in Ultimo in the course of his work. He took two steps onto the footpath, and was struck by a cyclist and knocked to the ground. The cyclist left the scene ignoring Hollis' calls. The cyclist was never identified, but was wearing a green jacket which in gold lettering bore the name of Vabu's business. As a result of the crash, Hollis needed knee surgery, was unable to work for a period, and suffered permanent injury.

=== Trial judge ===
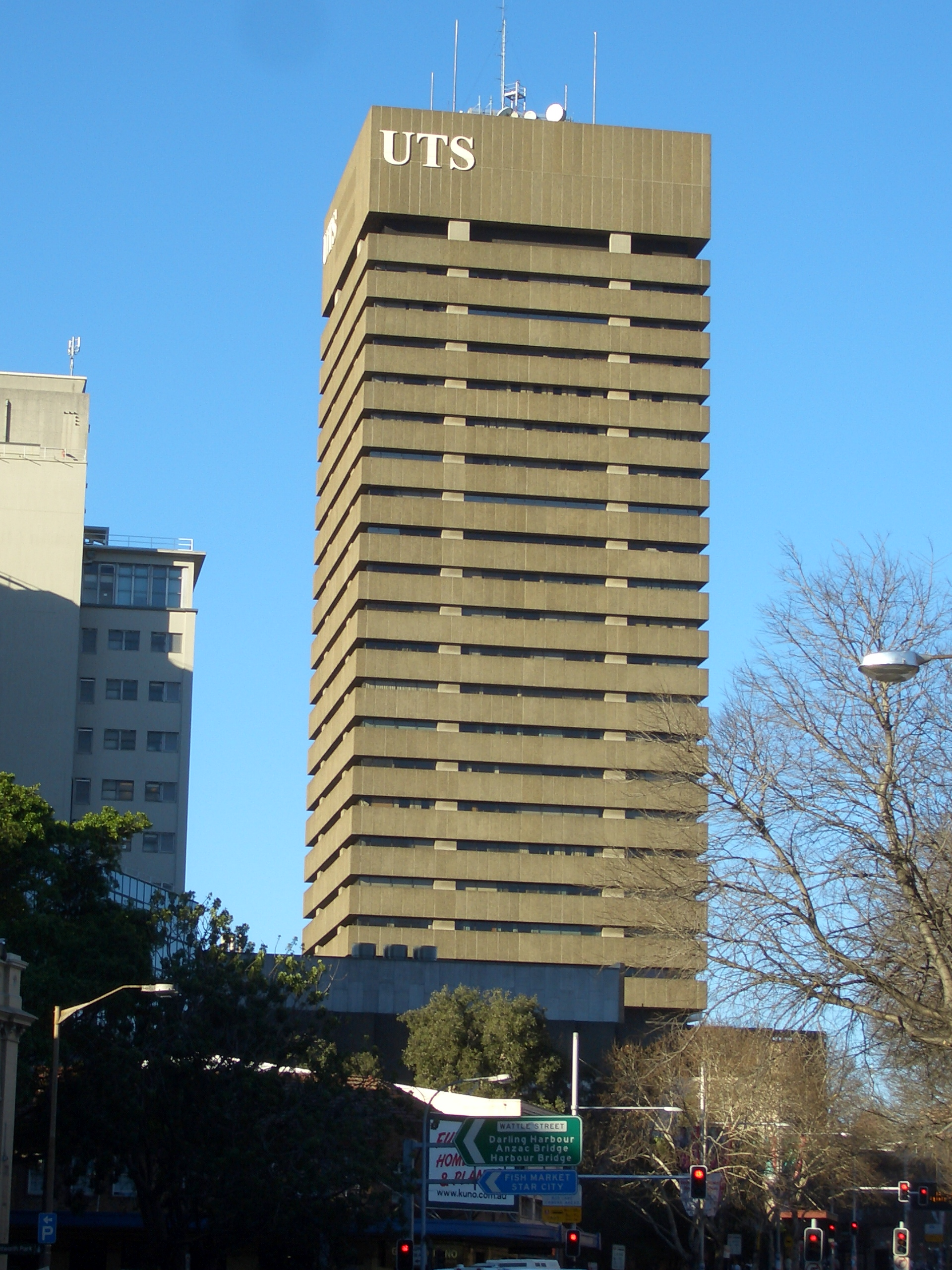
Pictured: the UTS Tower in Ultimo, the suburb in Sydney where Hollis was injured

The trial judge found that the cyclist was employed (in a colloquial sense) by Vabu Pty Ltd, and had been negligent in causing Hollis' injuries. No contributory negligence was made out, and damages were assessed at $176k. He found that Vabu set pay rates with no scope for negotiation. Jobs were allocated to couriers by a fleet controller at Vabu's premises. Vabu also assumed all responsibility for direction, training, discipline, and attire of couriers. Couriers were provided with equipment, which was Vabu's property and included the communication equipment. Couriers were required to wear Vabu's supplied clothing at all times, partly to advertise the company's services. Deductions from pay for insurance were imposed by Vabu on the couriers without opportunity for negotiation.

He also noted that couriers were in a 'take it or leave it' situation regarding pay, and that provisions for insurance excess that couriers were required to pay disincentivized them from reporting accidents.

Despite these findings, the trial judge decided the case for Vabu Pty Ltd. He regarded himself as bound to regard the cyclist as an independent contractor of Vabu, due to a recent NSWCA decision. That case had decided Vabu's couriers were independent contractors in a proceeding under the Superannuation Guarantee Act 1992.

=== Court of appeal ===
At appeal, the parties accepted the facts in the Superannuation dispute would apply to the case. Hollis made a concession that the couriers were not employees but independent contractors. The hearing then proceeded on that basis. Hollis was unsuccessful and appealed to the High Court.

== Judgment ==
=== Majority ===
The court decided an employment relationship existed between Vabu and its bicycle couriers.

They noted the absence of annual leave, superannuation, and sick leave from any contracts between Vabu and the couriers. Nevertheless, the court said, the relationship between the parties wasn't found 'merely from those contractual terms'. The court instead considered 'the system which was operated thereunder and the work practices imposed by Vabu' as establishing the 'totality of the relationship' between the parties.

In assessing that relationship, the court discussed facts which led to their ultimate finding of an employment relationship. Among these facts were:

- Low cost of equipment borne by the cyclists.
- Lack of skilled labour, or labour which required special qualifications.
- An inability to generate goodwill or make an independent career as a free-lancer.
- Couriers having little control over the manner in which they performed their work. (Note: The couriers were required to be at work by 9am, and assigned work by order of the controller. They were unable to refuse work. The court considered it unlikely that the couriers would be able to delegate work or work for other couriers throughout the day.)
- They were presented to the public as 'emanations of Vabu'. (Note: Vabu made the couriers wear uniforms bearing the business logo. It emphasized in documents that they were representatives of the company, and regulated their attire and grooming. These measures were done partly by Vabu to ensure advertising of its business.)
- Vabu superintended the couriers' finances. (Note: Vabu produced pay summaries, and couriers were required to dispute errors by 6pm on the Friday of that week. Couriers were subject to having their entire job's pay deducted if this dispute offended Vabu. Couriers had no scope to bargain for their remuneration rate, and rates were unchanged between 1994 and 1998. Vabu held the last week's pay of couriers for up to six weeks, in anticipation of deductions for overcharges, unpaid cash jobs, or insurance claims. Final cheques would not be processed until all Vabu's property was returned. Property damage and insurance costs were deducted from wages.)
- Vabu required the couriers to submit requests for leave, indicating that they had limited scope to pursue 'any real business enterprise on their own account'.
- The couriers being required to provide equipment that they also used in their personal life.
- Vabu's control went further than only 'incidental or collateral' matters. It had 'considerable scope for the actual exercise of control'. (Note: Vabu retained control of the 'allocation and direction' of deliveries, and couriers had 'little latitude'. Their work was allocated by Vabu's fleet controller. They delivered goods in the manner directed. Vabu's business involved the 'marshaling and direction' of the labour of the couriers)
- The couriers did more than supplement or perform only part of Vabu's business; rather, to 'customers they were Vabu and effectively performed all its operations in the outside world.

The per-delivery remuneration method was also discussed by the court, but it was said this was compatible with an employment finding. The policy consideration of deterrence was also relevant. Vabu knew of dangers to pedestrians yet failed to adopt effective means for couriers to be personally identified.

After noting these factors, the majority distinguished the facts from a similar case in New Zealand. They observed that drivers in that case had 'control over their own chosen area of territory', were responsible for employing relief drivers, held their own licenses, and could profit from their management efforts. Only a minimal amount of control and supervision of drivers was contracted for.

It then concluded by declaring the relationship between Vabu and the courier as being that of employer and employee. Vabu was therefore held vicariously liable for the courier's negligence. The court ordered the trial judge's assessment of $176k be paid to Hollis, and that Vabu bear costs.

== Aftermath ==
It is not publicly known what happened of Hollis following the decision. Crisis Couriers is still in operation in Sydney, but is operated by a different company.

== Significance ==
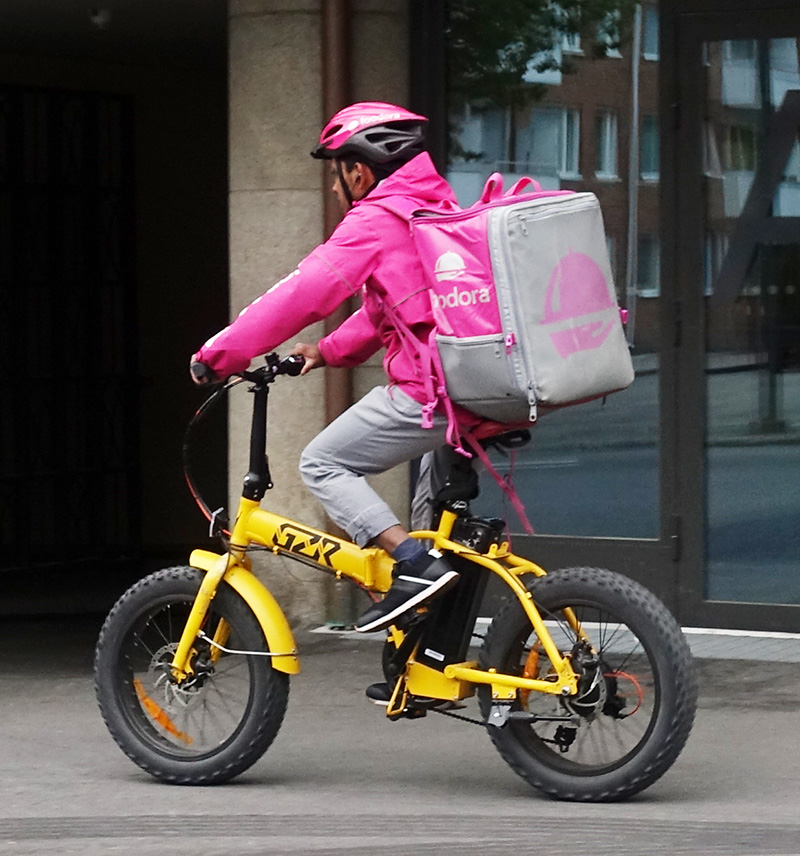
Pictured: a Foodora rider in Finland. Foodora entered voluntary administration in response to employer liability arising from an application of the Hollis v Vabu decision.

Hollis v Vabu has been cited over 832 times according to LawCite, placing it among the top 200 most cited decisions of the High Court.

The case has proved especially important in cases involving 'gig economy' workers. It was referenced and applied in Joshua Klooger v Foodora Australia Pty Ltd, a first instance Fair Work Commission decision that declared Foodora's Australian riders to be employees in a claim for unfair dismissal. Foodora entered voluntary administration following that decision.

The decision will be of importance to legal claims soon to be brought against the Australian arms of Deliveroo and Uber.

== See also ==
- Vicarious liability
- Gig economy
- Fair Work Act
