= Hollis Speedway =

Motorsport track in the United States

New Hollis Speedway
- Location: 9104 Highway 31; Heflin, Alabama
- Coordinates: 33°30′57″N 85°37′49″W
- Owner: Butler Margaret
- Broke ground: 1978
- Opened: 1979
- Former names: 431 Speedway, Hollis Crossroads Speedway, Hollis Dirt Track, Little River Speedway, Hollis Speedway

Dirt oval
- Length: 0.230 mi (0.370 km)
- Turns: 4

New Hollis Speedway is a 0.23-mile dirt oval motor racetrack in Cleburne County, Alabama near Heflin.

== History ==
The track opened in 1979 and operated continuously until 1998, reopening in 2002.

The track was prominently featured in a 2020 Washington Post article following NASCAR's banning of the Confederate flag at its events, though the New Hollis Speedway does not possess NASCAR sanction.

== Track Champions ==
Hollis Driver Champions
Year	Limited Late Model	6Cyl Hotshot	4Cyl Hotshot	Bomber	Hobby Stock	Mod Mini	Pure Mini	Street Stock	602 Late Model
2021	Bobby Marler		Josh Ganey	Zack Duke	Kyle Tompkins	John Butler			James George
2019	David Dickerson	Kameron Busby	Chris Elliott	Michael Burke	Patrick Taylor	Rodney Davis	Mikey Shutley	Elbert Sexton	
