= Holliston =

Holliston may refer to:

- Holliston, Saskatoon, Canada
- Holliston, Massachusetts, USA
  - Holliston High School, a secondary school in Holliston, Massachusetts
- Holliston (TV series), a television show on Fearnet, set in Holliston, Massachusetts

== People with the given name ==
- Holliston Coleman, American actress
