= Hollie Hughes =

Hollie Hughes may refer to:

- Hollie Hughes (horse trainer) (1888–1981), US trainer of Thoroughbred racehorses
- Hollie Hughes (politician) (born 1975), Australian politician
