= Thomas Hollis =

Thomas Hollis may refer to:

- Thomas Hollis (1659–1731), English merchant, benefactor of Harvard College, donator of the first town bible to Holliston, Massachusetts, which was named for him.
- Thomas Hollis (1720–1774), English author and political philosopher, also a benefactor of Harvard College.
- Thomas Brand Hollis (1719–1804), British political radical and dissenter.
- Tommy Hollis (1954–2001), American actor who played a supporting role in the 1992 film Malcolm X.

== See also ==
- Hollis Thomas (born 1974), former American football player.
