= Hollie Steel =

Singer and Musical Theatre performer from UK

- Born: 1 July 1998 (age 28); Huncoat, Lancashire, England
- Genres: Musical theatre; pop
- Occupation: Singer Actress
- Instruments: Vocals; piano
- Years active: 2009–present
- Label: BB5 Records Limited
- Website: Official website

Hollie Steel (born 1 July 1998) is an English singer and actress originally from Burnley, Lancashire, England. In 2009 at the age of ten she was one of ten finalists on the third series of the ITV reality show Britain's Got Talent finishing in sixth place overall.

Her first audition stunned the judges with her surprisingly strong voice. In her second appearance during the semi-finals Steel suffered a panic attack onstage. After a second attempt Steel then completed the song and advanced to the final.

She then toured arenas in the United Kingdom and Ireland, making live performances with the series' other finalists in the summer of 2009.

In September 2009, Steel began recording her debut album, Hollie, which was released in May 2010. The album was distributed in Hong Kong and UK.

Steel released a second album in late 2011, and in early 2012 a third album. She released her sixth single on 3 December 2012, Fly, which was recorded in Rome, Italy with Casa Musica, the single became popular on YouTube.

== Personal life ==
Steel has been singing since the age of four when she showed interest in her older brother Joshua's performances. She also attended the KLF Dance Academy in Burnley with him. Prior to Britain's Got Talent she performed in productions of Annie and Joseph and the Amazing Technicolor Dreamcoat.

Steel's parents, Nina and Jason, who work as National Health Service audiologists, said that she was entered in Britain's Got Talent so she would not feel left out as they felt her brother, Joshua, five years older, was more likely to progress. The judges preferred Hollie's audition and Joshua dropped out.

== Britain's Got Talent ==
In April 2009, Steel auditioned for the third series of Britain's Got Talent. In her first televised appearance, she began her number ballet dancing to "I Could Have Danced All Night" from the musical My Fair Lady, then, as judge Simon Cowell started to reach for his buzzer, she began singing the song with an unexpectedly powerful voice, stopping him from pressing it. She received a standing ovation from the audience and the approval of all four judges. Guest judge Kelly Brook was in tears and called her performance, "beautiful and lovely". Commentators and mainstream media outlets speculated that she might defeat Susan Boyle, who had made an impression worldwide in the first show of the series. Over thirteen million viewers watched Steel's performance and, within one day of a video of her performance being posted on YouTube, over a million viewers had seen her worldwide. She was interviewed on US television via satellite link during NBC's Today show.

During her semi-final of Britain's Got Talent in May, Steel suffered a massive panic attack on stage, causing her to stop mid-performance. After she had a drink of water and asked for a second chance, Ant and Dec broke the news to her that they did not have time for her to start over, which made her unhappy to the point Cowell intervened saying, "I don't care how we find it but we will find the time somewhere", and she was allowed to perform a second time. Her second attempt at "Edelweiss" went well and she was praised by the judges for being accomplished and brave in the trying circumstances.

In the final, she performed the song "Wishing You Were Somehow Here Again" from Phantom of the Opera. Her performance was well-received, and the viewer voting resulted in her finishing in sixth place, receiving 3.9% of the reported 4 million votes, calculating to 156,000 votes.

During June and July 2009, Steel appeared in Britain's Got Talent – The Live Tour 2009 with most of the other finalists from the third series. She was home tutored between rehearsals and the start of the tour. The rehearsals were held at the Apollo Theatre in Hammersmith. The tour opened at Birmingham, England on 12 June 2009, and finished on 5 July 2009 at Bournemouth. During the live stage shows, Steel performed solo and also in combination with other artists such as 2 Grand, with whom she performed "Edelweiss" in Newcastle.

== Singing career ==
In September 2009, Steel signed with record label VVR2, which she swiftly broke out of the contract after recording her debut single "Where Are You, Christmas?" from the 2000 film How the Grinch Stole Christmas. The single was released on 14 December 2009. The single, however, did not make it into the top 40 in the UK Singles Chart.

Steel's debut album, Hollie, was released on 24 May 2010. The album was released on Steel's own label, BB5 Records Limited, named after the Accrington postcode, and includes the Pendle's Arden Youth Choir on some of the classical pieces. Steel's second single was "Edelweiss", from The Sound of Music, and was released on 29 March 2010. Steel's third single was "I Could Have Danced All Night", from My Fair Lady, and "O Mio Babbino Caro", from Gianni Schicchi, and was released on 10 May 2010. Steel recorded at the sound studio in the ACE Centre in Nelson, Lancashire.

Steel's next single, consisting of two tracks, was released on 22 November 2010. The first song of the single is a cover of "When Christmas Comes to Town" from the 2004 animated/live action movie The Polar Express; and the music video became popular on YouTube. The second song is "O Holy Night". Steel also released a limited-edition 24-minute 2010 Christmas album available only on her official website, A Christmas Wish, consisting of six tracks with a complimentary 4-minute DVD titled "When Christmas comes to town."

On 4 December 2010, Steel gave performances of "O Mio Babbino Caro" and "O Holy Night" at Carnegie Hall in New York.

Steel was one of 16 artists on the CD Classical Crossover Compilation 2011, singing "Pokarekare Ana" on her track. She later released the song as a charity single to help those suffering from an earthquake in Christchurch, New Zealand.

In April 2011, Steel was cast in the role of Louisa von Trapp in Andrew Lloyd Webber's UK tour of The Sound of Music. Her first appearance in the show was on 27 May 2011 in Glasgow; her final performance was on 15 October 2011 in Wimbledon.

The young singer then trained at college in London for 3 years where she graduated in 2017 with a Diploma in Musical Theatre. Shortly after this Hollie appeared in a The Extraordinary Tale of Holly Christmas. at Salford "The Lowry" playing the leading role of "Holly".

In summer 2018 Steel began performing for Royal Caribbean on the Harmony of the Seas where she played the role of "Frenchy" in Grease until summer 2022.

== Discography ==
=== Albums ===
- 2010 – Hollie
- 2011 – Hooray for Christmas
- 2012 – Children on the Titanic

=== Singles ===
Title	Year	Album
"Where Are You, Christmas?"	2009	Non-album single
""Edelweiss"	2010	Hollie
"I Could Have Danced All Night"	2010	Hollie
"When Christmas Comes To Town"	2010	Hooray For Christmas
"Pokarekare Ana"	2011	Classical-Crossover Compilation 2011
"Fly"	2012	Non-album single
"Patched & Sewn"	2016	Non-album single

== Music videos ==
Title	Year	Director(s)	Ref.
"Edelweiss"	2010	Unknown	
"When Christmas Comes To Town"	2010	Unknown	
"Fly"	2013	Unknown	
"Patched & Sewn"	2016	Unknown	
