= Horace Holley (minister) =

American minister and university president

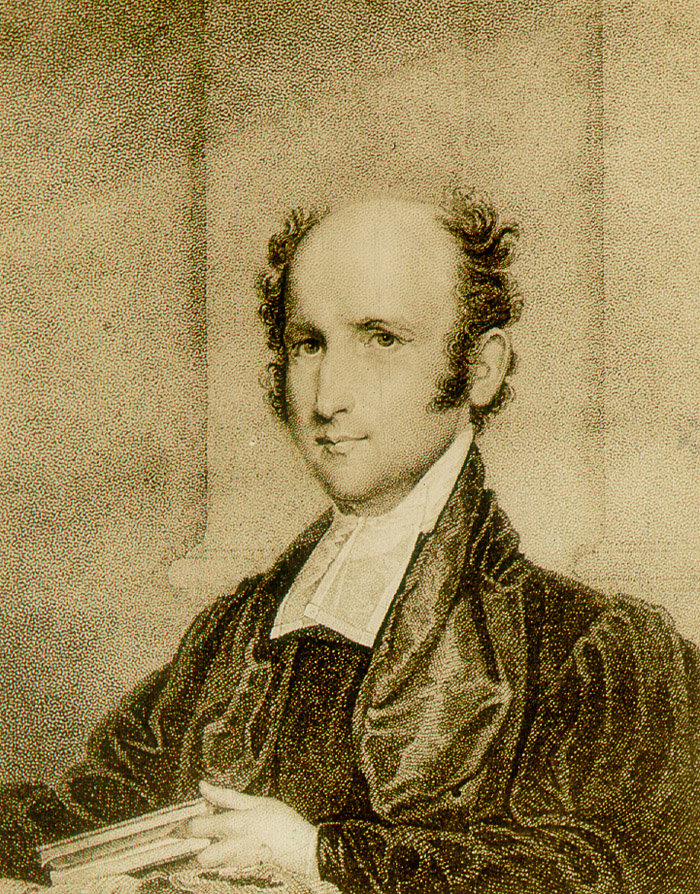
- Title: President of Transylvania University

Personal life
- Born: February 13, 1781 Salisbury, Connecticut
- Died: July 31, 1827 (aged 46) Aboard the ship Louisiana in the Gulf of Mexico

Religious life
- Religion: Unitarianism
- Ordination: 1804

Senior posting
- Based in: Lexington, Kentucky
- Period in office: 1818–1827
- Previous post: Pastor, Greenfield Hill Congregationalist Church (Fairfield, Connecticut); Pastor, Hollis Street Congregationalist Church (Boston, Massachusetts)

Horace Holley (February 13, 1781 – July 31, 1827) was an American Unitarian minister and president of Transylvania University in Lexington, Kentucky.

== Early life ==
Horace Holley was born February 13, 1781, in Salisbury, Connecticut, the fourth son of Luther and Sarah (Dakin) Holley. Orville L. Holley and Myron Holley were his brothers. Their father was the founder of a successful iron business, and was also a farmer and merchant.

Holley began his early studies before the age of four, and finished them by age ten. For the next few years, he studied at home under the tutelage of his father. In 1797, at the age of sixteen, he began preparatory studies at Williams College. He matriculated to Yale in 1799. While attending Yale, he became excited by the religious doctrines of Yale president Timothy Dwight, a staunch opponent of deism. In 1803, earned a Bachelor of Arts degree and delivered a graduation address entitled "The Slavery of Free Thinking."

== Ministry ==
Holley determined to pursue the profession of law, studying in the office of Riggs & Radcliffe of New York, but abandoned this ambition after only a few short months. He returned to Yale to study divinity under President Dwight. He earned his degree in December 1804, and was licensed to preach by the North Haven Association. On January 1, 1805, he married Mary Austin, a fellow student at Yale who would later publish History of Texas. The couple moved to Fairfield, Connecticut where Holley was ordained by the Western Consociation of Fairfield County, Connecticut on September 13, 1805. That same year, he began to pastor Greenfield Hill Congregationalist church in Fairfield, Connecticut.

During his short tenure at Greenfield Hill, Holley's religious views became more liberal, in part due to the influence of his wife, Mary. This shift in his religious views, as well as a desire for a more favorable financial situation, led him to resign his post at Greenfield Hill. He considered posts in Marblehead, Massachusetts; Middletown, Connecticut; and Albany, New York, but ultimately declined them all and moved to Boston in 1808. Shortly before the move, Holley's first child, Harriette Williman Holley, was born. Holley preached several trial sermons to large crowds in the Old South Church. Previously a Trinitarian, by the time Holley accepted the call to become pastor of Hollis Street Church in Boston, he had already become a Unitarian. Holley was installed as pastor on March 8, 1809.

While in Boston, Holley developed a reputation as a great orator. He became a member of several benevolent societies, including the Harvard Board of Overseers, the Boston School Committee, and the Washington Benevolent Society. The Washington Benevolent Society was affiliated with the Federalist Party, which Holley supported despite his respect for Thomas Jefferson. Holley served as a chaplain of the Massachusetts House of Representatives during the War of 1812. When Hollis Street Church was constructing a larger building, the congregation met with the congregation from Boston's First Church, and Holley shared the pulpit with William Emerson, father of philosopher Ralph Waldo Emerson. He was elected a Fellow of the American Academy of Arts and Sciences in 1812. and a member of the American Antiquarian Society in 1816.

== Presidency of Transylvania University ==
Transylvania University had a long-standing affiliation with the Presbyterian Church, but due to low enrollment and graduation numbers, the Kentucky General Assembly reorganized its Board of Trustees, temporarily diminishing the church's influence. The new board members, mostly men of political influence, believed Horace Holley's liberal religious views would foster academic progress and help realize their dreams of making Lexington the "Athens of the West."

Holley was first invited to become president of Transylvania University in 1815. He at first refused, but the Board of Trustees persisted, and again unanimously extended their invitation to Holley in 1817. Holley was intrigued by the second offer, and on an 1818 visit to Lexington, was given a tour of the city by native son Henry Clay. Impressed by what he saw, Holley accepted the offer to become president in April. He returned to Boston for his wife, daughter, and newborn son, Horace Austin Holley, and in September 1818, the family relocated to Lexington. Holley was inaugurated as president on December 19, 1818.

Holley's tenure at Transylvania was of immense benefit to the university. A new gymnasium and art gallery were opened. The library was substantially expanded. The school was reorganized as a four-year institution, and a medical school and law school were both founded. Holley attracted eminently qualified faculty to the university, including Constantine Samuel Rafinesque. By 1825, the medical school was ranked second in the country, enrollment had quadrupled, and the school had produced 650 graduates. (By comparison, in the period from the university's founding in 1799 to the beginning of Holley's tenure in 1818, it had produced only 60 graduates.)

In 1825 Holley welcomed Lafayette, who was doing a triumphal tour of the United States and to whom he dedicated one of his writings.

Tensions between Holley and the school's conservative Presbyterian leadership did not subside, however. His support of the Federalist Party also cost him a great deal of support in the state. Allegations surfaced regarding everything from fiscal mismanagement to the Holleys' extravagant social life. Public funding for the university dwindled, and in 1826, Holley's salary was cut. He further lost the support of Governor Joseph Desha, who disliked the university for what he perceived as its elitist character and for its association with Henry Clay. Overwhelmed by the opposition, Holley offered his resignation in January 1826, but the Board of Trustees refused to accept it. He resigned again in 1827; this time it was accepted.

== Later life and death ==
Following his resignation, Holley moved to New Orleans, where he hoped to take a group of young men on a tour of Europe as part of a "traveling academy." When the parents of the young men refused, Holley was invited to establish a new educational institution in New Orleans. Supporters promised Holley full fiscal and administrative control over the college.

Holley agreed to open the college, but first took leave to Boston to escape the hot climate and build up his health. While on this excursion, Holley and his wife both contracted yellow fever. Ms. Holley was so delirious with fever, she was not aware of her husband's death on July 31, 1827. Holley was buried at sea near the Dry Tortugas in the Gulf of Mexico.
