= Robert M. Holley =

American cartoonist

Robert M. Holley (July 1913 – January 4, 1977) was a well-known U.S. cartoonist, commercial artist, and advertising executive.

== Career ==
A native of Oklahoma, Holley dropped out of college in Florida at the age of 19, and a year later took his new wife to New York City (NYC) in the worst days of the Depression. Once there he studied at the Art Students League of New York (1933–36) and the George Pearse Ennis School of Painting (1933). Within a few years, he landed a job with the newly published Esquire magazine and soon became one of its favorites with his series of risque rooster / hen barnyard cartoons. A portfolio of seventeen of his creations appeared in the Esquire centerfold in the October 1940 issue.

In the late 1930s, he joined illustrator Sol Immerman to organize what was prior to 1942 known as the Immerman-Holley Art Studio. Through the mid 1940s the studio, employing several artists, and operating with the logo IM-HO, produced art for more than 200 sheet music covers; many of the tunes were popular patriotic WWII songs. At one time, it was estimated that IM-HO was doing art for scores of different music publishers and had 80% of the cover illustration business. Studio associate and prolific illustrator H. Lawrence Hoffman also worked with Immerman to produce a flood of cover art for paperback novels.

By 1944, Holley opened his own NYC advertising and graphic arts business—Robert Holley Associates, and by 1947, Robert Holley & Co, Inc. An avid jazz enthusiast, some of Holley's first clients were musical instruments companies which he had attracted through his knowledge of, and close friendship with, many NYC musicians. Most notable amongst these was cymbal manufacturer Avedis Zildjian Company, an advertising account he held until his death in 1977.

In 1954, Holley joined the New York branch of the McCarty Co. and was a Vice President there until 1959 at which time he established the Holley-Thomas Advertising Co. The latter operated in NYC until 1971 when it moved to Williston Park, NY. Following his infatuation with automobiles, second only to that for jazz, Holley's notable accounts included British Motor Corporation (MG, Austin-Healey, and Morris Minor) and Lucas Automotive.

== Personal life ==
Robert Holley was born in Stigler, Oklahoma in July 1913, son of Chester Orville Holley and Marguerite Keenan. Robert's father was an educator, and by 1926 was Florida's State Supervisor of Trade & Industrial Education. Robert became a teenager in Tallahassee, and by the time he was only 17 he established his own sign shop at a downtown location. He attended the University of Florida for about six months in 1930-31 and was initiated as a member of Sigma Alpha Epsilon social fraternity. To save up for his NYC venture, during summer months and while he was courting his sweetheart, he moved from one tiny south Georgia town to another creating one-of-a kind movie advertising posters for local theaters.

Holley eloped from Tallahassee with his student's fiancé one night in January 1933 and married at the tiny Wakulla Co., Courthouse in Crawfordville, FL. In the process, he managed to get his bride suspended from Florida State College for Women (FSCW). Holley's love was Mary Lee Askew (1913–1995), daughter of a lumber/citrus entrepreneur from Bartow/Lakeland, FL. They had two children—Robert in 1940 and Mary Lee in 1945.
