= Orville L. Holley =

American journalist (1791–1861)

Orville Luther Holley (May 19, 1791 Salisbury, Litchfield County, Connecticut – March 25, 1861 Albany, Albany County, New York) was an American writer, newspaper editor, historian and politician.

== Life ==
Born May 19, 1791, he was the son of Luther Holley (1752–1824) and Sarah Dakin Holley (1755–?). He graduated as Bachelor of Arts from Harvard University in 1813.

From May 1817 to April 1819, he edited the American Monthly Magazine and Critical Review in New York with Horatio Bigelow.

From July 1823 to 1826, and from 1827 to 1831, he edited the Troy Sentinel where he published in December 1823 anonymously a poem now better known as The Night Before Christmas but to which he gave the title Account of a Visit from St. Nicholas.

In 1836, he edited the Western Repository and Genesee Advertiser and absorbed the Canandaigua Freeman.

As a Whig, he was New York State Surveyor General from 1838 to 1842. He was elected in 1838 by joint ballot of the State Legislature defeating the incumbent William Campbell. In 1841, he was re-elected to another term of three years, but in 1842 all state officers were removed by the new Democratic majority.

Canal Commissioner Myron Holley and President of Transylvania University Horace Holley were his brothers.

== Works ==
- The New York State Register for 1843 edited by O. L. Holley (J. Disturnell, Albany NY, 1843)
- The New-York State Register for 1845 edited by Orville Luther Holley, George Roberts Perkins, C. Van Benthuysen (J. Disturnell, New York, 1845)
- The New York State Register for 1847 edited by Orville Luther Holley (J. Disturnell, New York NY, 1847)
- A Description of the City of New York (New York, 1847)
- The Life of Benjamin Franklin (John Philbrick, Boston, 1855, 468 pages; republished in 2007 by Lightning Source Inc, ISBN 0-548-49249-2, ISBN 978-0-548-49249-9, 492 pages)

== Sources ==
- The New York Civil List compiled by Franklin Benjamin Hough (pages 37f; Weed, Parsons and Co., 1858)
- History of the poem
- Newspaper history, at RootsWeb
- Newspaper transcriptions
- Harvard graduates

Political offices
Preceded by William Campbell	New York State Surveyor General; 1838–1842	Succeeded by Nathaniel Jones
