= Hollie (album) =

Album by Hollie Steel

Studio album by Hollie Steel
- Released: 24 May 2010
- Recorded: September–October 2009
- Genre: Classical crossover
- Label: BB5 Records Limited

Hollie Steel chronology
Hollie (2010)	Hooray for Christmas (2011)

Singles from Hollie
- 1. "Edelweiss" Released: 29 March 2010; 2. "I Could Have Danced All Night" Released: 10 May 2010

Hollie is the debut album by British singer Hollie Steel, The album's release was launched at The Roundhouse on 24 May 2010. Steel rose to fame after her appearance on the third series of Britain's Got Talent, and signed with a record label after the competition. The first single from the album, "Edelweiss", from The Sound of Music, was released on 29 March 2010. The second single, "I Could Have Danced All Night", was released on 10 May 2010. Both the singles and the album are being distributed by Universal and are available both in the shops and digitally online. The album features the Pendle's Arden Youth Choir on some of the classical pieces. Steel recorded the album at the sound studio in the ACE Centre in Nelson, Lancashire in September 2009.

== Track listing ==
Following is the order, name and duration of the tracks.

- 1. "O Mio Babbino Caro"—2:37
- 2. "Edelweiss"—4:34
- 3. "Come to My Garden"—2:54
- 4. "I Could Have Danced All Night"—2:40
- 5. "Nessun Dorma"—2:54
- 6. "The Music of the Night"—5:15
- 7. "Wishing You Were Somehow Here Again"—3:04
- 8. "Ave Maria"—4:30
- 9. "God Help the Outcasts"—3:41
- 10. "Panis angelicus"—2:59
- 11. "Hushabye Mountain"—4:00
- 12. "When She Loved Me"—3:14
- 13. "These Eyes of Mine"—3:42

"These Eyes of Mine" was co-written by Hollie and her father.
