= Myron Holley =

American politician and abolitionist (1779–1841)

- Born: April 29, 1779; Salisbury, Connecticut, United States
- Died: March 4, 1841 (aged 61); Rochester, New York, United States
- Occupations: lawyer, minister, politician, publisher
- Known for: Vocal support for abolitionism; helping establish the First Unitarian Church of Rochester; namesake of Holley, New York
- Spouse: Sally House (m. 1803)
- Children: 12, including Sallie

Myron Holley (April 29, 1779 – March 4, 1841) was an American politician who played a major role in the creation of the Erie Canal. In 1816, he was appointed to the five-person Erie Canal Commission, which had the task of organizing and supervising the canal's construction. As one of two full-time and salaried members of the commission, he was its treasurer and the supervisor for the construction of the canal's main route.

An opponent of slavery, Holley was an early supporter of the strategy of abolishing it through political action rather than "moral suasion". In 1839, he began publishing an abolitionist newspaper called the Rochester Freeman. In 1840 he was one of the founders of the abolitionist Liberty Party, a minor party that pressured the major parties to address the issue of slavery.

Holley supported the anti-Masonic movement, publishing two weekly newspapers focusing on that cause. He assisted the creation of Wayne County, New York, from portions of neighboring counties. In Rochester, New York, he built the Old Stone Warehouse, which still stands. He helped to establish the First Unitarian Church of Rochester by preaching sermons for it at a time when the young congregation could not support a paid minister.

== Early years ==
Holley was born on April 29, 1779, in Salisbury, Litchfield County, Connecticut, the son of Luther Holley (1751–1826) and Sarah Dakin Holley (1755–1830). His siblings included Orville L. Holley, a writer, journalist and politician; John Milton Holley, an iron manufacturer; and Horace Holley, a Unitarian minister who became the president of Transylvania University in Lexington, Kentucky.

After graduating from Williams College in 1799, Holley completed training to become a lawyer. In 1803, he moved to Canandaigua in western New York, where he met and married Sally House, with whom he had twelve children. His budding legal career ended when a judge assigned him to defend a man accused of murder. Holley decided he could not do so in good conscience when he realized the man actually had committed murder. Afterwards he managed a local bookstore and served as village postmaster before being appointed County Clerk for Ontario County. He was elected to the New York State Assembly in 1816 and 1820-21.

== Erie Canal Commissioner ==
Holley joined the state legislature during a time of vigorous debate over a proposal for the state to build the Erie Canal, a 363-mile (584-km) waterway linking the Hudson River in the eastern part of the state with Lake Erie in the west. Settlers in the western part of the state were becoming economically dependent on Canada, which was controlled by the British, finding it less expensive to ship their goods there by boat than to eastern New York by wagon. The War of 1812, which had just ended, demonstrated that a lack of adequate transportation made it difficult to defend western New York against the British. Despite its obvious benefits, not everyone agreed that the proposed canal was feasible. In 1809, President Thomas Jefferson had dismissed the idea as "little more than madness."

Elected to the legislature largely because of his support for the proposed canal, Holley became part of the successful campaign to convince the legislature to approve its construction. In 1816 he was appointed to the Erie Canal Commission, which had the task of organizing and supervising the canal's construction. The commission had five members. Its leader was DeWitt Clinton, the governor of New York during most of the canal's construction. Holley was the commission's treasurer and the supervisor for the construction of the canal's main route. He was one of two commissioners who worked full-time on the project and were paid salaries for doing so. The other was Samuel Young, who supervised the northern spur of the canal system, called the Champlain Canal, which linked the Hudson River to Lake Champlain. The remaining two commissioners, Joseph Ellicott and Stephen Van Rensselaer, were rich landowners. Benjamin Wright, who was not a member of the commission, was the project's chief engineer.

In 1817, Holley submitted a seventy-four-page estimate of the cost of building the canal, which came to almost $5,000,000 (~$130 million in 2024). Its actual cost after eight years of construction was $7,770,000. Estimating the cost was difficult because the project faced challenges for which solutions were not yet known. For example, the canal's many stone-and-mortar locks would require hydraulic cement, a type that does not weaken when submerged in water. That type of cement was available at the time only in Europe, which meant that a substitute based on local minerals would need to be developed if the project was to succeed.

During the canal's construction, Holley spent much of his time traveling along its route on horseback, negotiating and supervising a multitude of small, localized contracts scattered along the canal's length, dispensing cash, and maintaining records that were stored in his knapsack. He sometimes slept in workers' shacks and occasionally was forced to sleep outside with no shelter at all. During an outbreak of malaria, he helped care for the affected workers.

In 1824, as construction of the canal neared an end, Holley submitted a treasurer's report that contained hundreds of pages of figures. As he did so, he admitted that he was unable to account for about $30,000 of the project's expenses. Holley's enemies in the state legislature arranged for his property to be seized to pay for the shortage. The state eventually restored his property after an investigation revealed no suspicious amount of money in his bank account and no unexplained change in his lifestyle. One of Holley's biographers offered possible reasons for the discrepancy in the accounts, including the difficulty of managing a huge number of receipts under challenging conditions, and the state's practice of sometimes dispensing funds for the project through the other commissioners without informing Holley.

The largest public works project in the nation's history up to that point, the canal was immensely important to New York State and to the country. New York City, a direct beneficiary of the canal, quickly replaced Philadelphia as the nation's main seaport. Within 25 years of the canal's completion, the population of New York City quadrupled. By dramatically reducing transportation costs between the eastern U.S. and the Great Lakes, the canal stimulated rapid growth in the latter region, contributing to the strength of northern forces during the American Civil War.

== Move to Lyons ==
In 1821, Holley and two other men bought a 300-acre farm in the eastern part of Lyons, New York, a village on the Erie Canal not far from his home in Canandaigua. After the farm was divided into building lots, he built a house on one of them and moved his family there. He soon became a leader of the successful effort to create a new county, called Wayne County, from portions of neighboring counties, with Lyons as the county seat.

== Anti-Masonic activity ==
The Freemasons, a secretive fraternal organization, grew in influence after the War of 1812 to such an extent that many people began to view it as a threat to the democratic process. An anti-Masonry movement developed in response, a movement that Holley vigorously supported. He published an anti-Masonic weekly newspaper called the Lyons Countryman from 1831 to 1834. He accepted an offer in 1834 to move for a year to Hartford, Connecticut, leaving his family in Lyons, for a paid position as the creator and publisher of an anti-Masonic weekly called Free Elector. The Freemason movement declined in influence by the end of the 1830s.

== Political abolitionism ==
During a time when slavery was legal in New York, Holley purchased an enslaved African American woman, Polly Carrol, to help maintain the Holley household. She stayed with them for a few years, but around 1815, after the birth of the third of the Holley's twelve children, she asked a local doctor to purchase her from the Holleys, and he did so. She was freed in 1827 when slavery was outlawed in New York. Holley afterwards became convinced that slavery was wrong, and he eventually became a national leader of the emerging movement to abolish it entirely.

The establishment of the American Anti-Slavery Society (AASS) in 1833 was a significant step in the development of the abolitionist movement. Its goal was to end slavery by appealing to the consciences of white Americans through moral suasion. Holley and many other abolitionists, however, were becoming increasingly convinced that moral suasion wasn't working and that political action was needed, creating a bitter split within the movement. In 1837, Holley and his friend Elizur Wright began discussing the idea of forming a national political party, named the Liberty Party, as an effective way of opposing slavery. Others who played major roles in forming the party included Gerrit Smith, James G. Birney, and John Greenleaf Whittier.

At a meeting of the AASS in Ohio in October, 1839, Holley introduced a resolution saying, "That when existing parties directly oppose or purposely overlook the rights of the slave it is time to form a new political party", and he proposed that a committee be established to nominate abolitionist candidates for U.S. President and Vice President. The meeting voted to oppose his attempt to convert the AASS itself into a political party. In November, at a convention to discuss the issue that was led by Holley in Warsaw, New York, he introduced the same resolution, and this time it passed. This convention called for a national convention to be held on April 1, 1840, in Albany, New York, to consider the formation of an abolitionist political party. At the Albany convention, Holley spoke passionately in favor of the proposal for nearly two hours. The convention voted its approval and formally established the Liberty Party. The American Anti-Slavery Society split at its annual convention a month later when supporters of a political approach to abolishing slavery left the organization to form their own anti-slavery society.

Holley worked full-time as a campaigner for the party in New York state and in 1840 ran unsuccessfully for state senator on its ticket. The Liberty Party was a minor party, one that never received many votes. It did, however, contribute to the process of making slavery an issue that was addressed by the major parties, eventually resulting in the creation of the Republican Party and the nomination of Abraham Lincoln as U.S. President in 1860.

== Rochester years ==
Holley had long-standing connections to Rochester, New York, which was not far from his earlier homes in Canandaigua and Lyons. In 1822, he built the Old Stone Warehouse in Rochester at the juncture of the Erie Canal and the Genesee River. It was well-located for storing goods that needed to be transferred to and from canal barges, including flour that had been ground in mills at the nearby High Falls of the Genesee. The building is on the National Register of Historic Places.

Holley bought and began operating a farm just outside Rochester in 1837. He also earned money by giving anti-slavery lectures throughout the area. He later sold the farm and moved to a rental home in downtown Rochester, using the proceeds from the sale to buy a printing press. In 1839, in failing health from heart problems and two years before his death, he began publishing an abolitionist newspaper called the Rochester Freeman.

Frederick Douglass, a prominent anti-slavery activist who had escaped from slavery, moved to Rochester in 1847 and began publishing an abolitionist newspaper called the North Star. Afterwards, he created a stir within the abolitionist movement by announcing that he was switching from moral suasion to political abolitionism. He merged his newspaper with Gerrit Smith's Liberty Party Paper and published it under the name of Frederick Douglass' Paper. In his autobiography, he gave credit to those who helped make his work possible, saying "The ground had been measurably prepared for me by the labor of others – notably Hon. Myron Holley."

Holley disapproved of the strident evangelism of Charles Grandison Finney, whose influential sermons in Rochester and elsewhere in western New York resulted in that area being labeled the Burned-over District. Holley, whose brother Horace was a Unitarian minister, played a key role in establishing the less dogmatic First Unitarian Church of Rochester. An accomplished speaker, he preached sermons for the young congregation at a time when it could not support the salary of an ordained minister. The church later attracted other abolitionists, including the Anthony family, whose daughter, Susan B. Anthony, went on to become a national leader of the women's suffrage movement.

== Death and remembrance ==
Holley died on March 4, 1841, and was buried in Rochester's Mount Hope Cemetery. Members of the Liberty Party erected an obelisk at his gravesite as a memorial to him and attached to it a stone medallion with his image. The monument's inscription reads, "The Liberty Party of the United States of America have erected this monument to the memory of Myron Holley, the friend of the slave, and the most effective, as well as one of the very earliest of the founders of that party".

His daughter Sallie Holley was buried next to him, and a stone medallion with her image was added to a different side of the obelisk. She and her life-long friend Caroline F. Putnam established the Holley School for African Americans in Virginia just after the Civil War. She worked there until she died in 1893.

The village of Holley, New York, which is on the Erie Canal, is named in honor of Myron Holley.

== Sources ==
- Bernstein, Peter L. (2005). Wedding of the Waters: The Erie Canal and the Making of a Great Nation. New York: W. W. Norton. ISBN 0-393-32795-7.
- Smith, Theodore Clarke (1897). The Liberty and Free Soil Parties in the Northwest. New York: Longmans, Green, and Co.
- Johnson, Reinhard O. (2009). The Liberty Party, 1840–1848: Antislavery Third-Party in the United States. Louisiana State University Press. ISBN 978-0807175163.
- Reisem, Richard O. (2013). Myron Holley: Canal Builder/Abolitionist/Unsung Hero. Rochester, New York: Friends of Mount Hope Cemetery. ISBN 978-0-9641033-6-8.
- Wellman, Judith (2004). The Road to Seneca Falls: Elizabeth Cady Stanton and the First Women's Rights Convention. University of Illinois Press. ISBN 0-252-02904-6.
- Wright, Elizur (1882). Myron Holley; and What He Did for Liberty and True Religion. self-published. LCCN 11021027.
- Laws of the State of New York, in Relation to the Erie and Champlain Canals: Together with the Annual Reports of the Canal Commissioners, and Other Documents Requisite for a Complete Official History of Those Works etc. published by the Secretary of State's Office, New York (State) (E. and E. Hosford, printers, 1825). Contains the Attorney General's Report on the question of whether Holley's sureties had liability to refund the State for the remainder of the shortage, with an outline of Holley's financial proceedings.
