= The Hollies' Greatest Hits =

The Hollies' Greatest Hits is the name of:

- The Hollies' Greatest Hits (1967 album) (North America)
- The Hollies' Greatest Hits (1968 West German album)
- The Hollies' Greatest Hits (1973 album)

== See also ==
- Hollies' Greatest, a 1968 album
- The Hollies discography
