= Holly Township =

Holly Township may refer to:

- Holly Township, Michigan
- Holly Township, Murray County, Minnesota
- Holly Township, Pender County, North Carolina, in Pender County, North Carolina
