= Charles Wellford Leavitt =

American engineer

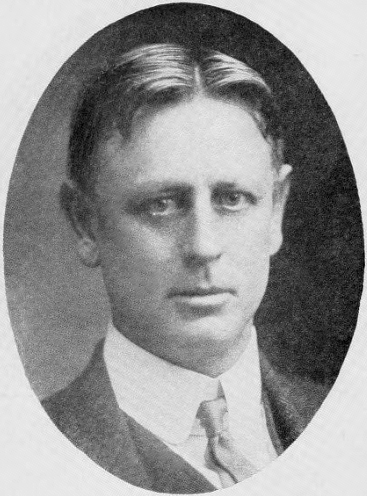
- Born: March 13, 1871; Riverton, New Jersey
- Died: April 22, 1928 (aged 57); Hartsdale, New York
- Occupations: Landscape architect, urban planner
- Spouse: Clara Gordon White (m. 1899)
- Children: 5
- Relatives: Cecilia Beaux (father's cousin)

Charles Wellford Leavitt Jr. (March 13, 1871 – April 22, 1928) was an American landscape architect, urban planner, professor of landscape architecture, and civil engineer who designed everything from elaborate gardens on Long Island, New York and New Jersey estates to federal parks in Cuba, hotels in Puerto Rico, plans of towns in Florida, New York and elsewhere. New York publisher Julius David Stern called Leavitt "a rare combination of engineer, artist, and diplomat", and the multi-faceted career chosen by Leavitt, veering between public and private commissions and embracing everything from hard-edged engineering to sensuous garden design, and calling for negotiations with everyone from wealthy entrepreneurs to county commissioners, called for an individual with singular talents. Leavitt was one of the preeminent landscape architects of his era and helped found the study of landscape architecture at New York City's Columbia University, where he was one of the first three professors in the university's new four-year program in the discipline.

== Early life ==
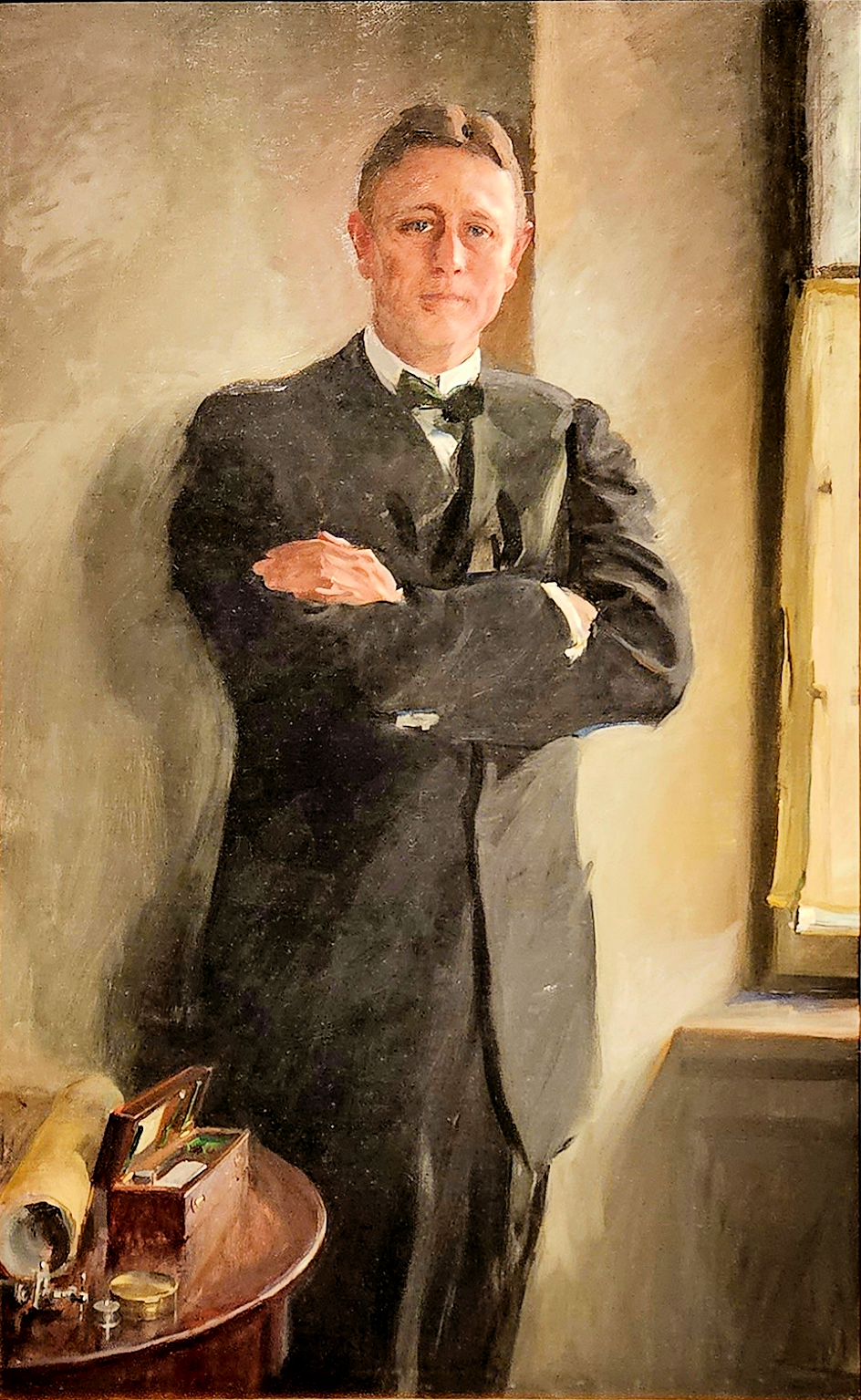
Portrait of Leavitt's father, Charles Wellford Leavitt, by his cousin Cecilia Beaux

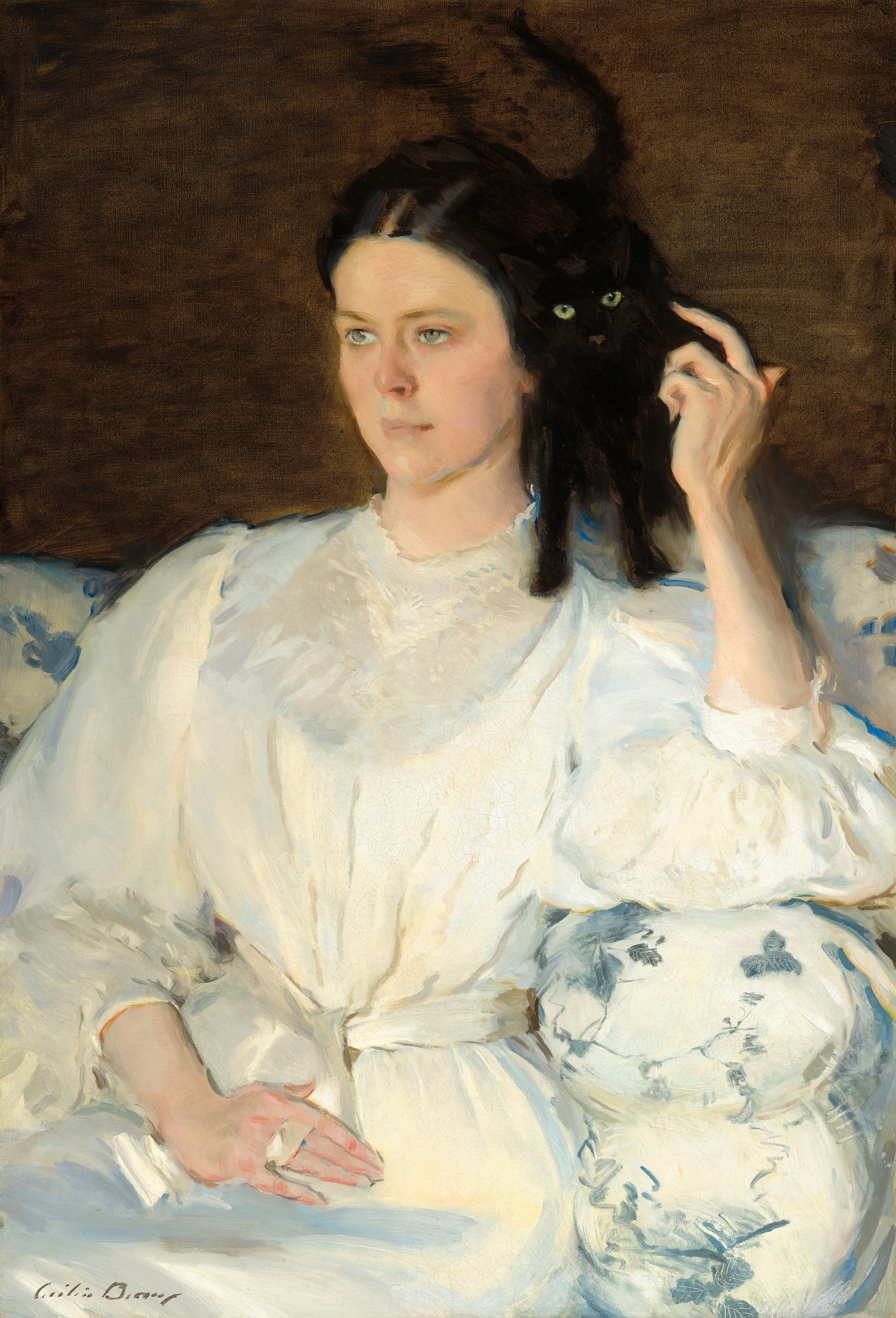
Leavitt's mother, Sarah Allibone Leavitt, by Cecilia Beaux

Charles Wellford Leavitt Jr. was born in Riverton, New Jersey, on March 13, 1871, the son of Charles Wellford Sr. and Sarah (Allibone) Leavitt. (Note: Charles Wellford Leavitt Sr. and Sarah (Allibone) Leavitt named another son William Foster Biddle Leavitt for the uncle of painter Cecilia Beaux, granddaughter of John Wheeler Leavitt.) He was educated at The Gunnery school in Washington, Connecticut, and the Cheltenham Military Academy in Cheltenham, Pennsylvania. (Note: The Leavitt family were originally from Suffield, Connecticut, and were family relations of the Philadelphia portraitist Cecilia Beaux, one of whose best-known paintings is of Sara (Allibone) Leavitt, mother of Charles Wellford Leavitt the architect. Cecilia Beaux frequently socialized with Charles Wellford Leavitt Sr. and his son Charles, Jr. The Philadelphia portrait painter also executed a painting of Leavitt in 1911 entitled Portrait of Charles Wellford Leavitt, the Artist's Cousin.)

== Personal life ==
Charles Wellford Leavitt Jr. married Clara Gordon White (1877–1956) at Essex Fells, New Jersey in 1899, and the couple subsequently had five children (though one died in infancy). (Note: The couple's four children were: Gordon, born in 1901; Kent, born in 1903; Charlotte, born in 1906; and Dundas, born 1910. Another daughter died in her infancy. The four other children were Gordon, Charlotte, Kent and Dundas Leavitt.)

== Professional career ==
Leavitt began his career as an assistant engineer in charge of construction with the East Jersey Water Company, then subsequently joined the Caldwell Railway and acted as engineer for the town of Essex Fells, New Jersey, where he directed the engineering and construction of water and sewer facilities, roads and other municipal facilities. By 1897 Leavitt had set up his own practice in New York City, and began to take on large projects in the area of landscape design, civil engineering and architecture.

Leavitt became a sought-after specialist, particularly in landscape and garden design, (Note: As a landscape architect, Leavitt frequently worked with other preeminent architects of the day on plans, including the firm of McKim, Mead & White.) and designed the gardens at estates belonging to such figures as Walter P. Chrysler, William C. Whitney, for whom Leavitt also designed a private racetrack on his estate, Henri Willis Bendel, Daniel S. Lamont, Foxhall P. Keene, Felix M. Warburg, Lillian Sefton Dodge, (Note: The Lillian Sefton Dodge Estate is located in Mill Neck, Nassau County, New York.) H. Fletcher Brown, (Note: The H. Fletcher Brown estate is located in Wilmington, Delaware.) E. K. Cone, George C. Smith, Issachar Cozzen III, Carlton Macy, George B. Post, Harry K. Knapp, Anson W. Hard and others. Most of Leavitt's landscape commissions were in the New Jersey hunt country and the North Shore of Long Island, but he also worked as far afield as Pasadena, California and Duluth, Minnesota. Sometimes he acted as landscape architect on homes designed by other architects; often he also designed the homes as well as the adjacent landscaping.

Leavitt's landscape designs ranged from enormous Italianate gardens (Charles Schwab estate, Loretto, Pennsylvania), to more intimate wildflower enclosures (J. A. Haskell estate, Red Bank, New Jersey). Typically, Leavitt's designs for the gardens of the wealthy took account of the local topography, the axis of the home and the local fauna and flora. At Kykuit, the Rockefeller family home, John D. Rockefeller worked with Leavitt on designing approach roads to the estate; his son John D. Rockefeller Jr. then conferred with designer Leavitt on the estate's landscaping, but ultimately chose the landscape architect Welles Bosworth to design the estate's gardens.

"Leavitt had the wit to suggest terracing, particularly on the steep slope to the west of the house," write Robert F. and Baldwin Dalzell in The House the Rockefellers Built, "but his ideas were trumped by the fortuitous appearance of another contender."

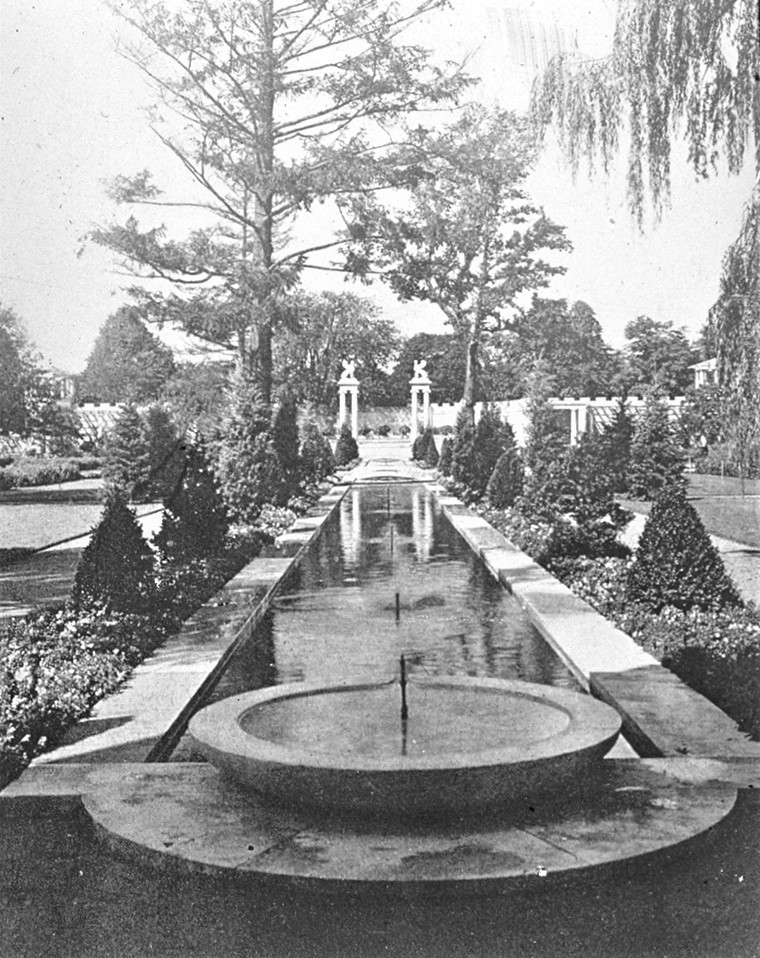
Formal gardens, Samuel Untermyer estate, Yonkers, New York, c. 1900. Charles Wellford Leavitt, landscape architect. Library of Congress

Leavitt's design work on estates eventually led him to other far-flung commissions. After designing a home for Foxhall Keene, for instance, Leavitt subsequently designed several race courses for Keene, an equestrian and race track owner, including the Empire City Race Track, as well as the tracks at Saratoga, Sheepshead Bay, Belmont Park, Toronto, Montreal and Winnipeg.

But Leavitt's interests were not limited to confections for the Gilded Age elite. He took a deep interest in city planning, especially that of his adopted city of New York. On January 3, 1922, for instance, Leavitt was moved to write The New York Times concerning the routing of traffic flow, an issue addressed in a recent Times story. "The construction, operating, financial and economic aspects of any problem belong to the engineer and his field", wrote Leavitt to The Times. "This city is rich in her wealth of men of engineering genius and talent."

Leavitt went on to praise the work of the city's engineers the previous winter in attempting to channel the city's growing traffic – a solution, Leavitt wrote, that had been largely successful. "The only failure seems to have been in the area of publicity", he said, "Engineering training, although thoroughly practical in many ways, is evidently visionary and weak when it comes to the matter of the creation of headlines."

In his municipal planning work, Leavitt became a forceful practitioner of the City Beautiful architectural movement of the day. His design for the Lake Mirror Promenade in Lakeland, Florida, executed in the 1920s, is one of the best-known examples of the emerging movement in city planning which altered the course of landscape design and changed the face of urban planning. The promenade circles the side of Lake Mirror on the east side of downtown, and incorporated a loggia, a pedestrian area with a mix of public and private buildings, and a large open circle of lawn designed to accommodate an obelisk sculpture (that was never built). The promenade, with its columns and other architectural elements, was meant to evoke ancient Rome or Greece.

In his plan for the University of Georgia campus, executed in 1906, Leavitt helped spearhead the emerging City Beautiful Movement. Leavitt's design hewed to the Beaux Arts style but paid close attention to the axial relationship of buildings to open space. The Leavitt Plan for the campus remains influential in the university's planning today,

Leavitt's Georgia plans, and other prominent commissions, brought him to the attention of developers such as James Buchanan Duke, who was anxious to convert his 3,000 acres (12 km^{2}) in Somerville, New Jersey into a moneyed enclave. In 1910 Duke hired Leavitt as his landscape architect to lay out the winding avenues, concrete walks, "and plenty of shade trees and ornamental plants" that would lend cache to Duke's proposed development.

Forbes Field, Pittsburgh, Pennsylvania. One of two stadiums designed by Charles Wellford Leavitt, civil engineer, city planner and landscape architect.

In selecting Leavitt, Duke had chosen a landscape architect and engineer who had also worn the developer's hat as well. In the late 19th century, Leavitt teamed with Philadelphia businessman Anthony S. Drexel to create the New York Suburban Land Company. After learning that the railroads were going to extend service into New Jersey and southward, Drexel sent Leavitt to investigate, later going into business with the architect as well as Drexel's son-in-law John F. Fell. Their resulting partnership purchased 1,000 acres (4.0 km^{2}) from General William J. Gould for development, and named the community after Fell. (Subsequent tough economic times forced the partnership under the management of Drexel's estate – but with engineer Leavitt still in charge).

Camden County, New Jersey also hired Leavitt after organizing its park commission in 1926. As consulting engineers, Leavitt and his firm were charged with developing a countywide public park and playground system. But Camden County subsequently purchased several properties which, Leavitt argued, were bought solely to enhance the property values of well-connected Camden businessmen – one of whom was the Commissioner of Parks. Although some of Leavitt's early plans were utilized, "the Park Commission therefore fired the brilliant engineer and so lost the vital support and support of his patron, Eldridge Johnson, president of the Victor Talking Machine Company."

Leavitt (Note: Many former junior partners and consulting engineers at Leavitt's firm, located at 220 Broadway in New York City, later went on to distinguished careers of their own, including Noble Hoggson, the consultant to Seattle's Washington Park Arboretum, influential Minnesota landscape architect Arthur Nichols, Australian architect Norman Weekes, and many others.) also designed municipal parks, including the federal parks in Cuba, the Washington Crossing Park on the Delaware River, and did much of the initial town planning of West Palm Beach, Florida, and Garden City, New York, as well as other prominent urban design projects. He served as chief engineer for the Palisades Interstate Park Commission (Note: In his role as chief engineer for the PIPC, Leavitt proposed in the 1920s the creation of the Henry Hudson Drive, "a rustic roadway many miles in extent with a river view at all points" along the length of the Palisades, as Leavitt put it. Following Leavitt's suggestion, the Henry Hudson Drive opened in sections between 1921 and 1926.) and designed urban plans for Long Beach; Garden City, Long Island, New York; Monument Valley Park in Colorado Springs, Colorado; the lieutenant governor's residence in Toronto, Ontario; he also designed the stadium grandstand at Pittsburgh's Forbes Field, and was the primary landscape architect for Woodlawn Cemetery in the Bronx.

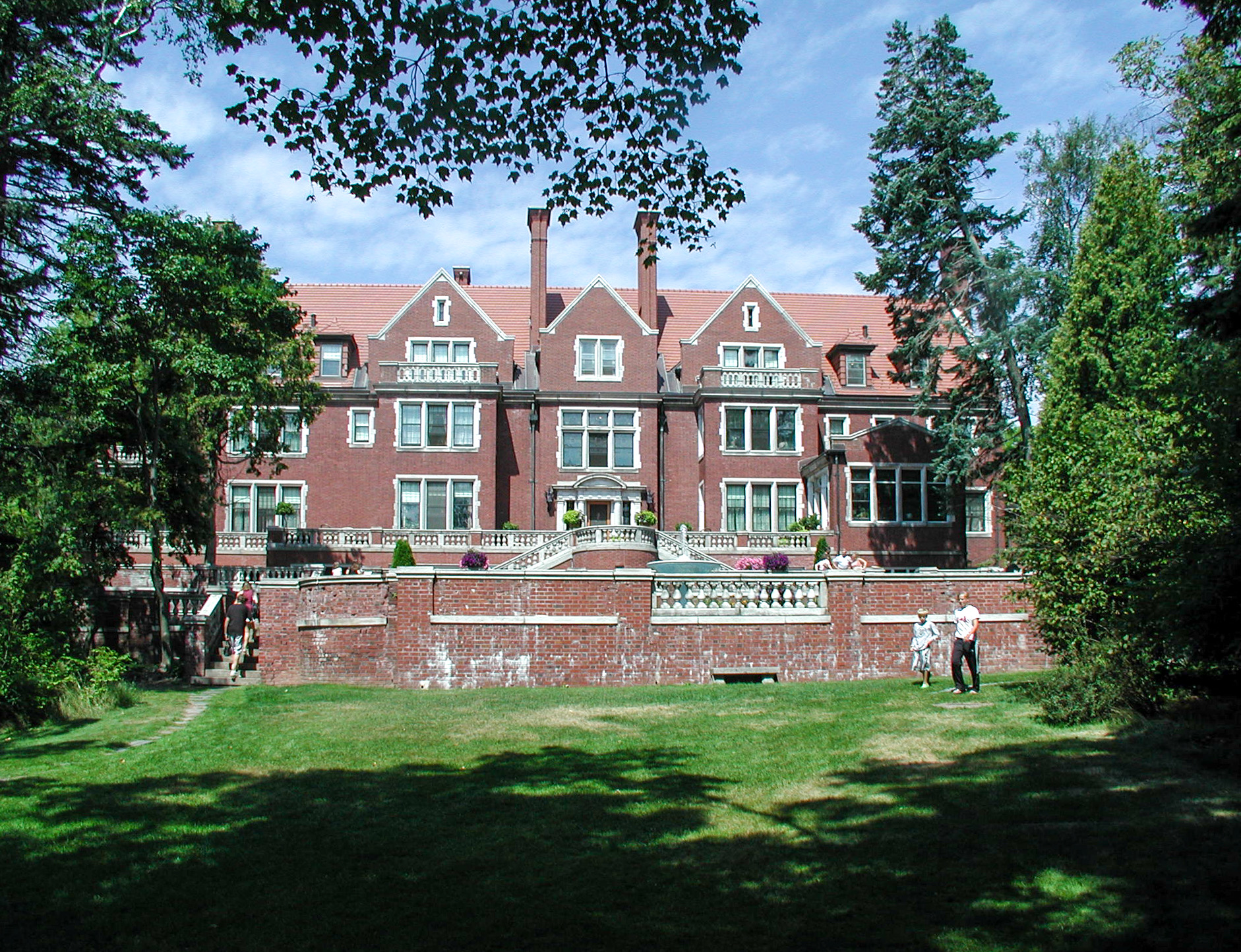
Glensheen Estate, Minnesota. One of many estates laid out by landscape designer Charles Wellford Leavitt.

Charles Leavitt, a resident of Hartsdale, New York, was a longtime member of the American Society of Civil Engineers, the American Society of Landscape Architects, and the Architectural League of New York. Like many architects, especially in the era in which Leavitt practiced, he often bounced between his professional responsibilities and the social contacts which furnished him a steady stream of well-heeled clients. During his early years in business particularly, Leavitt was heavily reliant on his principal engineering assistant Robert W. Sayles, who died in 1913.

On Leavitt's own death at age 57 from pneumonia in April 1928, the firm, which had become Charles Wellford Leavitt & Son, remained active until 1940, run by Leavitt's son Gordon. In its obituary of Leavitt, The New York Times noted his design of disparate structures, including country clubs, (Note: Among the country clubs Leavitt designed was the Rumsford Country Club in Rumson, New Jersey.) race tracks, private estates, as well as his work on the Palisades and town planning. The Times called the designer a "landscape engineer" and "park designer."

== See also ==
- Forbes Field
- Glensheen Historic Estate
- Lehigh University Buildings
- Brookhaven, Georgia
- Cecilia Beaux
