= Dear Eloise / King Midas in Reverse =

Studio album by The Hollies
- Released: 27 November 1967
- Recorded: 1 August – 6 October 1967 (except 3 March 1967 for "Leave Me")
- Studio: Abbey Road Studios, London
- Genre: Psychedelic rock; rock; pop
- Label: Epic Records
- Producer: Ron Richards

The Hollies US chronology
Evolution (1967)	Dear Eloise / King Midas in Reverse (1967)	Words and Music By Bob Dylan (1969)

Dear Eloise / King Midas in Reverse is the seventh U.S. studio album by the British pop band the Hollies, released in November 1967. "King Midas in Reverse" and "Leave Me" (saved from the UK Evolution track line-up) were slotted onto the album while deleting "Pegasus", "Try It" and "Elevated Observations" from the UK Butterfly track listing. It was the Hollies' last album to feature Graham Nash until 1983's What Goes Around, as well as the last to feature songs written solely by members Allan Clarke, Graham Nash and Tony Hicks.

As noted below, this album was really a Nash-led project, and he featured as the lead vocalist more than on any prior album.

== Track listing ==
All tracks are written by Allan Clarke, Tony Hicks and Graham Nash.

Side one
No.	Title	Length
1.	"Dear Eloise"	2:33
2.	"Wishyouawish"	1:58
3.	"Charlie and Fred"	2:54
4.	"Butterfly"	2:41
5.	"Leave Me"	2:06
6.	"Postcard"	2:04

Side two
No.	Title	Length
7.	"King Midas in Reverse"	3:07
8.	"Would You Believe"	3:02
9.	"Away Away Away"	2:19
10.	"Maker"	2:33
11.	"Step Inside"	2:52

== Personnel ==
The Hollies

- Allan Clarke – vocals, harmonica
- Tony Hicks – lead guitar, vocals
- Graham Nash – rhythm guitar, vocals
- Bobby Elliott – drums
- Bernie Calvert – bass, keyboards
