= Just One Look =

Just One Look may refer to:

== Arts, entertainment, and media ==
=== Music ===
- "Just One Look" (Doris Troy song), a 1963 song by Doris Troy
  - Just One Look (EP), a 1964 EP by The Hollies, includes a cover version of the Doris Troy song
- "Just One Look", a 1988 song by Christopher Cross

=== Other arts, entertainment, and media ===
- Just One Look (film), a 2002 Hong Kong film
- Just One Look (novel), a 2004 novel by Harlan Coben
