= Here I Go Again (EP) =

EP by The Hollies
- Released: October 1964
- Genre: Rock
- Length: 9:57
- Language: English
- Label: Parlophone
- Producer: Ron Richards

The Hollies chronology
Just One Look (EP) (1964)	Here I Go Again (1964)	In The Hollies Style (1964)

Here I Go Again is the title of the third EP by The Hollies. It was put out by Parlophone in mono with the catalogue number GEP 8915 and released in the UK in October 1964. All songs on this EP were previously released by the Hollies at the time. Side A consisted of covers of R&B songs, tracks from the band's debut album, Stay with the Hollies while the B-side contained both sides of the "Here I Go Again" single from May 1964.

== Track listing ==
Side one
No.	Title	Writer(s)	Lead vocals	Length
1.	"You Better Move On"	Arthur Alexander	Clarke	2:46
2.	"Memphis"	Chuck Berry	Clarke	2:34

Side two
No.	Title	Writer(s)	Lead vocals	Length
3.	"Here I Go Again"	Clive Westlake, Mort Shuman	Clarke	2:19
4.	"Baby That's All"	Mann, Chester (a pseudonym for Clarke-Hicks-Nash referring to Manchester, the town the Hollies were from).	Clarke	2:18

== Personnel ==
- Allan Clarke, lead vocals, acoustic guitar
- Graham Nash, vocals, rhythm guitar
- Tony Hicks, vocals, lead guitar
- Bobby Elliott, drums
- Eric Haydock, bass guitar
