= The Hollies (EP) =

EP by The Hollies
- Released: June 1964
- Genre: Rock
- Length: 8:11
- Label: Parlophone
- Producer: Ron Richards

The Hollies chronology
Stay with the Hollies (1964)	The Hollies (1964)	Just One Look (EP) (1964)

The Hollies is the first EP by The Hollies. It was put out by Parlophone in mono with the catalogue number GEP 8909 and released in the UK in early June 1964. The EP entered the British charts on 6 June 1964 and spent 8 weeks there, peaking at #8 on the Record Retailer chart.

Band originals "What Kind of Love" and "When I'm Not There" were not previously released on an album or single while the covers of "Whatcha Gonna Do 'Bout It" and "Rockin' Robin" were previously released on the band's debut album, Stay with the Hollies.

All the tracks from this EP were first recollected on the See for Miles Records compilation The EP Collection in 1987 and have seen several re-releases since then.

== Track listing ==
Side one
No.	Title	Writer(s)	Lead vocals	Length
1.	"Rockin' Robin"	Thomas	Clarke	2:17
2.	"What Kind of Love"	Allan Clarke, Tony Hicks, Graham Nash	Clarke	1:46

Side two
No.	Title	Writer(s)	Lead vocals	Length
3.	"Whatcha Gonna Do 'Bout It"	Gregory Carroll, Doris Payne	Clarke	2:19
4.	"When I'm Not There"	Hicks	Clarke	1:49

== Personnel ==
- Allan Clarke — lead singer
- Bobby Elliott — drums
- Eric Haydock — bass guitar
- Tony Hicks — lead guitar, vocals
- Graham Nash — rhythm guitar, vocals
