= Just One Look (EP) =

EP by The Hollies
- Released: June 1964
- Genre: Rock
- Length: 9:14
- Language: English
- Label: Parlophone
- Producer: Ron Richards

The Hollies chronology
The Hollies (EP) (1964)	Just One Look (1964)	Here I Go Again (EP) (1964)

Just One Look is the title of the second EP by The Hollies. It was put out by Parlophone in mono with the catalogue number GEP 8911 and released in the UK in late June 1964. The EP entered the British charts on 27 June 1964 and peaked at #8 on the Record Retailer chart after ten weeks. All songs on this EP were previously released at the time. Side A consisted of the A and B-side to the band's "Just One Look" single released in February 1964. Side B contained two tracks from the band's debut album, Stay with the Hollies.

== Track listing ==
Side one
No.	Title	Writer(s)	Lead vocals	Length
1.	"Just One Look"	Gregory Carroll, Doris Payne	Graham Nash	2:31
2.	"Keep Off That Friend of Mine"	Bobby Elliott, Tony Hicks	Allan Clarke	2:05

Side two
No.	Title	Writer(s)	Lead vocals	Length
3.	"Lucille"	Albert Collins, Richard Penniman	Clarke	2:29
4.	"Talking About You"	Chuck Berry	Clarke	2:11
