= Sing Hollies in Reverse =

1995 tribute album

Compilation album of The Hollies songs performed by various artists
- Released: 1995
- Genre: Rock, pop
- Label: Eggbert

Sing Hollies in Reverse is a tribute album of various artists performing songs by British rock group The Hollies. It was released on Eggbert Records in 1995.

According to AllMusic reviewer Roch Parisien, the 21 artists represented 1995's then-current "cream of contemporary power-pop," with contributions by The Posies, Steve Wynn, Tommy Keene, and The Loud Family. A review in The Riverfront Times cited the tribute for having "an eclecticism that the Hollies never did," praising some of the redone versions as "far superior to the originals."

== Track listing ==
1. "King Midas In Reverse" – performed by The Posies
2. "Carrie Anne" – performed by Tommy Keene
3. "Look Through Any Window" – performed by The Loud Family
4. "The Air That I Breathe" – performed by Steve Wynn with Eric Ambel
5. "Pay You Back With Interest" – performed by Mitch Easter
6. "You Know He Did" – performed by Cub
7. "I'm Alive" – performed by Kristian Hoffman
8. "Water on the Brain" – performed by The Flamingoes
9. "Jennifer Eccles" – performed by E
10. "On a Carousel" – performed by The Jigsaw Seen
11. "Long Cool Woman (In a Black Dress)" – performed by John Easdale
12. "Step Inside" – performed by Bill Lloyd
13. "After the Fox" – performed by Loser's Lounge
14. "You Need Love" – performed by The Wondermints
15. "So Lonely" – performed by The Sneetches
16. "I Can't Let Go" – performed by Continental Drifters
17. "Touch" – performed by Carla Olson
18. "Heading for a Fall" – performed by Andrew Sandoval
19. "Bus Stop" – performed by Material Issue
20. "Dear Eloise" – performed by Shakin' Apostles
21. "Sorry Suzanne" – performed by Jon Brion
