= Little Lover =

Little Lover may refer to:

- "Little Lover", a song by AC/DC from the album High Voltage
- "Little Lover", a song by The Hollies from the album Stay with The Hollies
