= Butterfly (Hollies album) =

1967 album by The Hollies

Studio album by the Hollies
- Released: 1 November 1967
- Recorded: 1 August – 6 October 1967
- Studio: EMI, London
- Genre: Psychedelic pop; experimental pop
- Length: 33:14
- Label: Parlophone
- Producer: Ron Richards

The Hollies chronology
Evolution (1967)	Butterfly (1967)	Hollies' Greatest (1968)

Professional ratings
Review scores
Source	Rating
AllMusic	2.5/5 stars
Q	3/5 stars
The Encyclopedia of Popular Music	4/5 stars
Sounds	4/5 stars
Uncut	7/10

Butterfly is the seventh studio album by the English rock and pop band the Hollies, released on 1 November 1967. It was the band's final album to feature Graham Nash before his departure from the group in 1968. The album consisted solely of songs written by the trio of Nash, Allan Clarke, and Tony Hicks, with Nash leading the sessions. It showcased the band's pop-oriented approach to psychedelia.

In the US and Canada, Epic Records released an alternate version of the album as Dear Eloise / King Midas in Reverse (also November 1967), featuring a different track selection/order and alternate artwork. The 1967 single "King Midas in Reverse" was not included on the UK version of the album, but was added to the North American version. A 1998 CD reissue brings together all the tracks from both versions of the album.

== UK Release ==
As with Evolution (1967), none of the songs on the UK album were selected for single or EP release in the UK. The mono single and stereo CD versions of "Try It" differ greatly in terms of sound effects and vocals. Cash Box said of "Dear Eloise" that it has "pounding orchestrations and a tremendous vocal sound added to the exotic beginning-finish."

In 1978, Parlophone reissued Butterfly with new cover art, and again in 1999. Almost all current CD issues of this album contain the original cover art.

=== Track listing ===
All tracks are written by Allan Clarke, Tony Hicks, and Graham Nash.

Side one
No.	Title	lead vocals	Length
1.	"Dear Eloise"	Nash and Clarke	3:04
2.	"Away Away Away"	Nash	2:19
3.	"Maker"	Nash	2:52
4.	"Pegasus"	Hicks	2:38
5.	"Would You Believe?"	Clarke	4:08
6.	"Wishyouawish"	Nash	2:04

Side two
No.	Title	lead vocals	Length
7.	"Postcard"	Nash	2:17
8.	"Charlie and Fred"	Clarke with Nash and Hicks	2:56
9.	"Try It"	Clarke with Nash	3:04
10.	"Elevated Observations?"	Clarke and Nash	2:32
11.	"Step Inside"	Clarke and Nash	2:51
12.	"Butterfly"	Nash	2:42

== Dear Eloise / King Midas in Reverse ==
Dear Eloise / King Midas in Reverse

Studio album by the Hollies
- Released: 27 November 1967
- Recorded: 1 August – 6 October 1967; (except 3 March 1967 for "Leave Me")
- Studio: EMI, London
- Genre: Psychedelic pop; experimental pop
- Length: 28:09
- Label: Epic Records
- Producer: Ron Richards

The Hollies US chronology
Evolution (1967)	Dear Eloise / King Midas in Reverse (1967)	Words and Music By Bob Dylan (1969)

The North American version of Butterfly was retitled Dear Eloise / King Midas in Reverse, given a different full-color cover featuring a picture of the group, and released on Epic Records on 27 November 1967. The US and Canadian versions both included the single "King Midas in Reverse" and the UK Evolution track "Leave Me", while deleting the UK Butterfly songs "Pegasus", "Try It" and "Elevated Observations".

=== Release ===
In the US, "Dear Eloise" was issued as a single A-side while "Try It" and "Elevated Observations?" were issued as B-sides of the "Jennifer Eccles" and "Do the Best You Can" singles, respectively. In Canada, the single "Dear Eloise" reached No. 36.

Billboard praised the titular singles and added that "the other nine cuts don’t disappoint," summarizing the album as a "wealth of good material, well-handled."

The 1998 US CD reissue of Dear Eloise/King Midas in Reverse by Sundazed presents the original UK Butterfly track line-up with "King Midas in Reverse", "Leave Me" and "Do The Best You Can" added to the track listing.

Professional ratings
Review scores
Source	Rating
AllMusic	3/5 stars

=== Track listing ===
All tracks are written by Allan Clarke, Tony Hicks, and Graham Nash.

Side one
No.	Title	Length
1.	"Dear Eloise"	2:33
2.	"Wishyouawish"	1:58
3.	"Charlie and Fred"	2:54
4.	"Butterfly"	2:41
5.	"Leave Me"	2:06
6.	"Postcard"	2:04

Side two
No.	Title	Length
7.	"King Midas in Reverse"	3:07
8.	"Would You Believe"	3:02
9.	"Away Away Away"	2:19
10.	"Maker"	2:33
11.	"Step Inside"	2:52

== Personnel ==
- Allan Clarke – vocals, harmonica
- Tony Hicks – lead guitar, vocals, electric sitar on "Maker"
- Graham Nash – rhythm guitar, vocals, harmonium on "Dear Eloise"
- Bobby Elliott – drums
- Bernie Calvert – bass, keyboards
- John Scott – string and brass arrangements
