= Graham Nash =

British and American musician (born 1942)

Graham Nash OBE
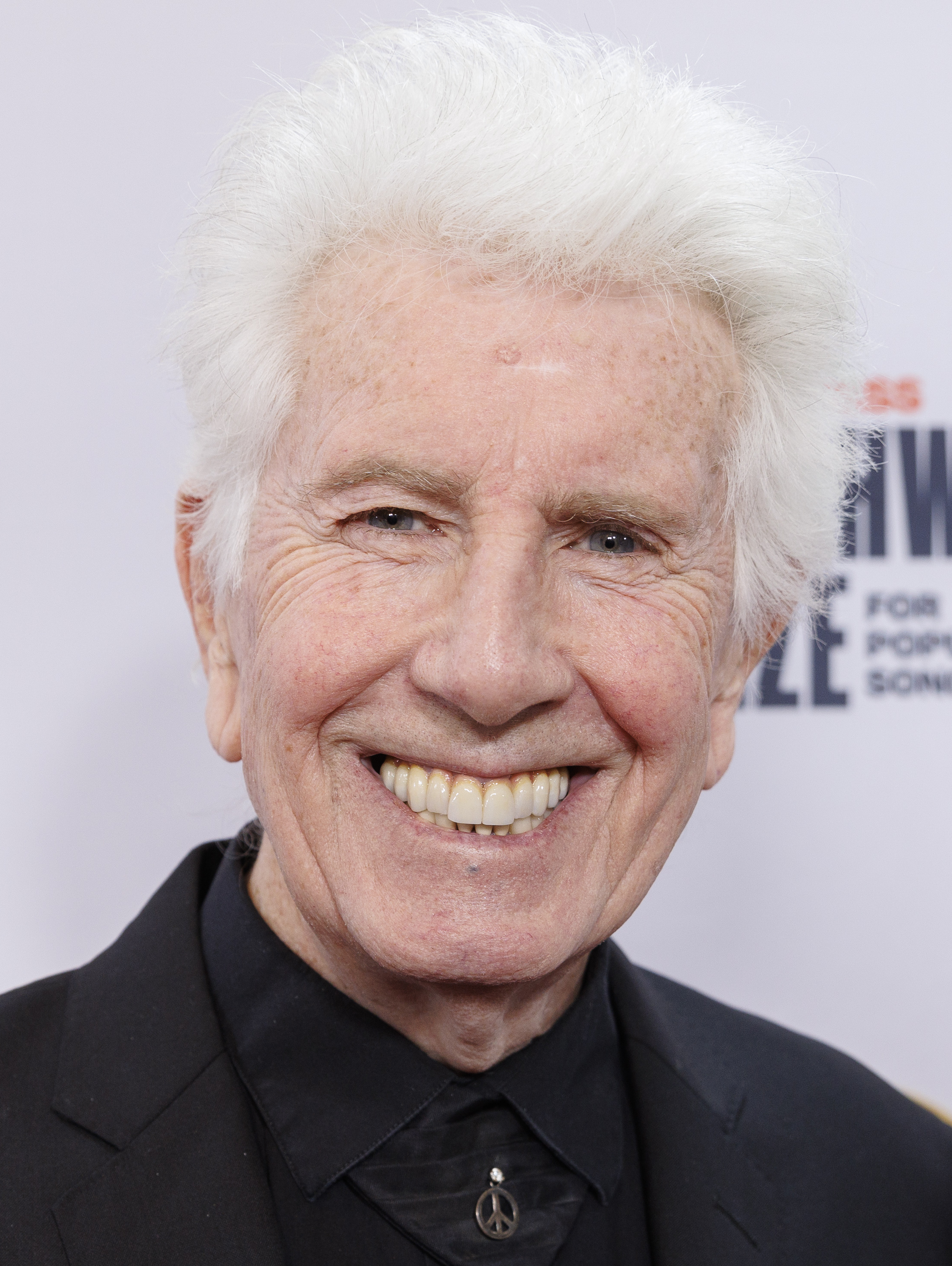
- Nash in 2023

Background information
- Born: Graham William Nash; 2 February 1942 (age 84); Blackpool, Lancashire, England
- Origin: Salford, Lancashire, England
- Genres: Rock; pop; folk
- Occupations: Musician; singer; songwriter; photographer
- Instruments: Vocals; guitar; keyboards
- Years active: 1958–present
- Labels: Epic; Atlantic; ABC; MCA; EMI; Reprise; Artemis
- Formerly of: The Hollies; Crosby, Stills & Nash; Crosby, Stills, Nash & Young; Crosby & Nash
- Website: grahamnash.com

Graham William Nash (born 2 February 1942) is a British and American musician, singer and songwriter. He is notable for his light tenor voice and for his contributions as a member of the Hollies and Crosby, Stills & Nash.

Nash is a photography collector, a published photographer, and digital image printing pioneer. He was inducted into the Rock and Roll Hall of Fame as a member of Crosby, Stills & Nash in 1997 and as a member of the Hollies in 2010. He was appointed an Officer of the Order of the British Empire (OBE) in the 2010 Birthday Honours List for services to music and to charity.

Nash holds four honorary doctorates, including one from the New York Institute of Technology, one in music from the University of Salford in 2011 and one in fine arts from Lesley University in Cambridge, Massachusetts.

== Early life ==
Graham William Nash was born on 2 February 1942 in Blackpool, Lancashire, to where his mother had been evacuated from her hometown of Salford when World War II began. The family returned to Salford, where Nash grew up. When Nash was 14, his father was sent to prison for a year for receiving a stolen camera; he had bought the camera as a present for Graham but had then refused to disclose to the police the name of the relative who had sold it to him.

== Music career ==
=== The Hollies ===
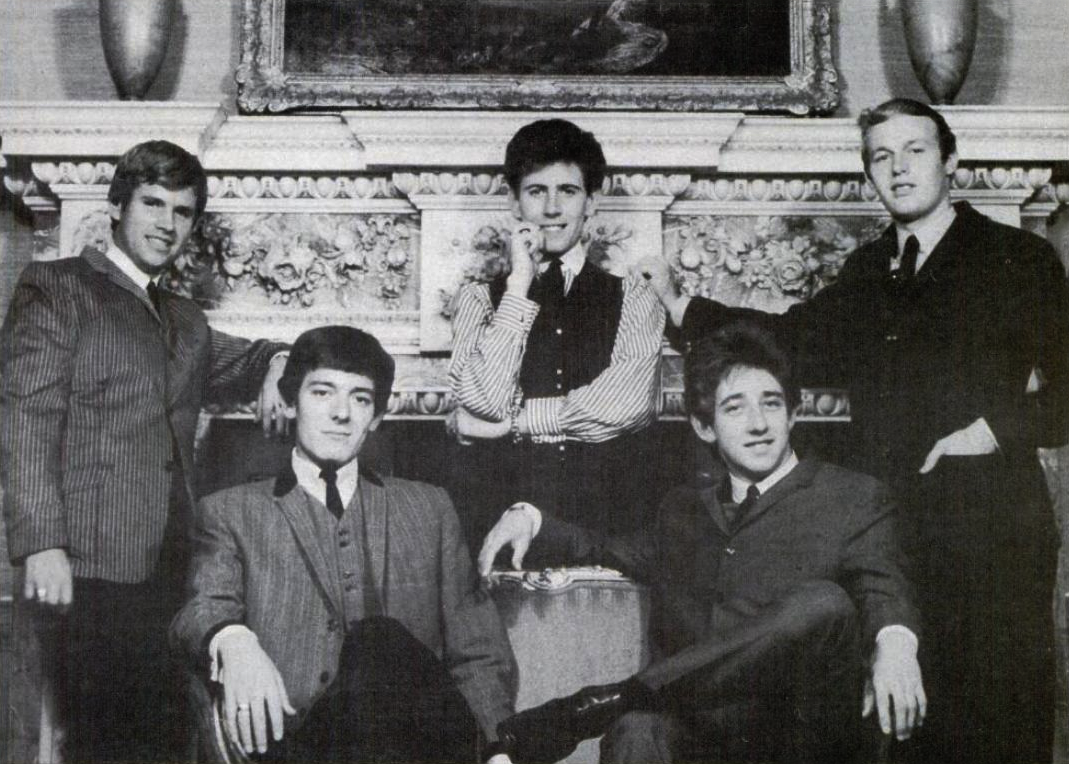
Nash (middle) with the Hollies in 1964

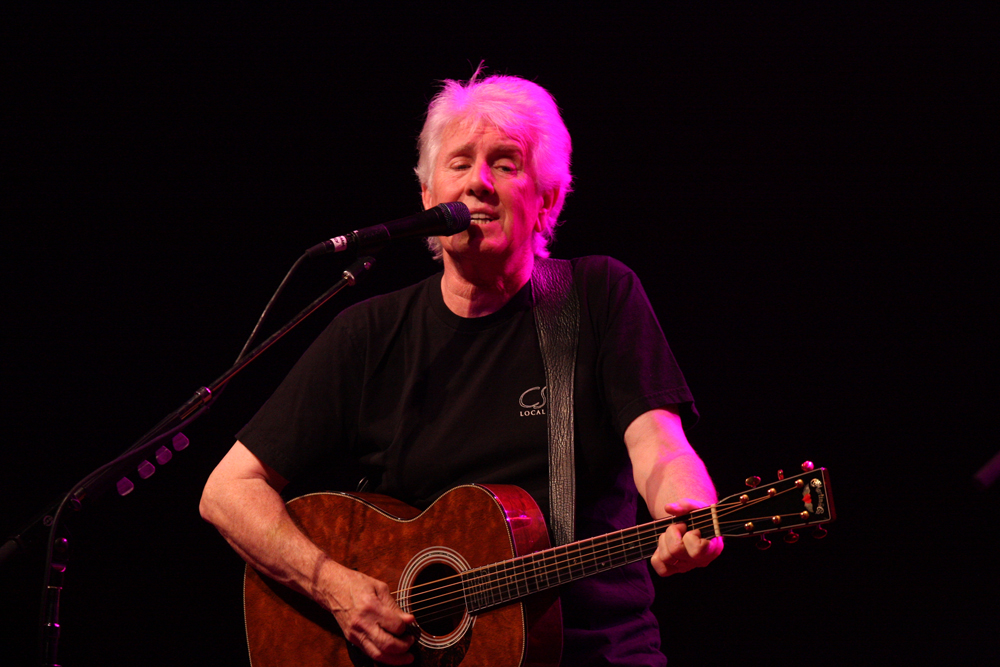
Nash performing in 2011

In the early 1960s, Nash co-founded the Hollies, one of the UK's most successful pop groups, with school friend Allan Clarke, and was credited as the group's leader on their first album. He was featured vocally on "Just One Look" (1964) and sang his first lead vocal on the original Hollies song "To You My Love" on the band's second album In The Hollies Style of the same year. He often sang featured bridge vocals on later Hollies recordings ("So Lonely", "I've Been Wrong", "Pay You Back With Interest") and provided lead vocals on several later singles, notably "On a Carousel" and "Carrie Anne" (both 1967).

Nash encouraged the Hollies to write their own songs, initially with Clarke, then with Clarke and guitarist Tony Hicks. From 1964 to mid-1966 they wrote under the alias L. Ransford. Their own names were credited on songs from "Stop Stop Stop" from October 1966 onward. In 1965, Nash, with Allan Clarke and guitarist Tony Hicks, formed Gralto Music Ltd, a publishing company which handled their own songs and later signed the young Reg Dwight (a.k.a. Elton John) who played piano and organ on Hollies 1969 and 1970 recordings.

Nash was pivotal in the forging of a sound and lyrics, often writing the verses on Clarke, Hicks & Nash songs. Nash also wrote songs by himself under the 'team banner' (like Lennon & McCartney), including "Fifi the Flea" (1966), "Clown" (1966), "Stop Right There", and "Everything Is Sunshine" (1967). The Butterfly album included several of his songs that had less group participation and exhibited more of a singer-songwriter approach. He was disappointed when this new style did not register with their audience, especially "King Midas in Reverse" (Nash and producer Ron Richards clashed over this song because Richards believed it was 'too complex' to work as a hit single).

=== Crosby, Stills, Nash & Young ===
Nash initially met both David Crosby and Stephen Stills in 1966 during a Hollies US tour. On a subsequent visit to the US in 1968, he was more formally introduced to Crosby by mutual friend Cass Elliott in Laurel Canyon, Los Angeles. Nash left the Hollies to form a new group with Crosby and Stills. A trio at first, Crosby, Stills & Nash later became a quartet in 1969 with Neil Young: Crosby, Stills, Nash & Young (CSNY).

With both configurations, Nash went on to even greater worldwide success, penning many of CSN's most-commercial hit singles such as "Our House" (about the house in Laurel Canyon shared with his then-lover Joni Mitchell); "Teach Your Children" and "Marrakesh Express" (both of which had been rejected by the Hollies); "Just a Song Before I Go"; and "Wasted on the Way". Nash, nicknamed "Willy" by his bandmates, has been described as the glue that keeps their often fragile alliances together.

Nash became politically active after moving to California, as reflected in his anti-Vietnam War songs "Military Madness" and "Chicago / We Can Change the World" (about the trial of the Chicago Eight).

=== Crosby & Nash ===
In 1972, during CSNY's first hiatus, Nash teamed with Crosby, forming a successful duo. They worked in this configuration on and off for many years, producing four studio albums and a few live and compilation albums. His song "Immigration Man", Crosby & Nash's biggest hit as a duo, arose from a tiff he had with a US Customs official while trying to enter the country.

=== Solo career ===
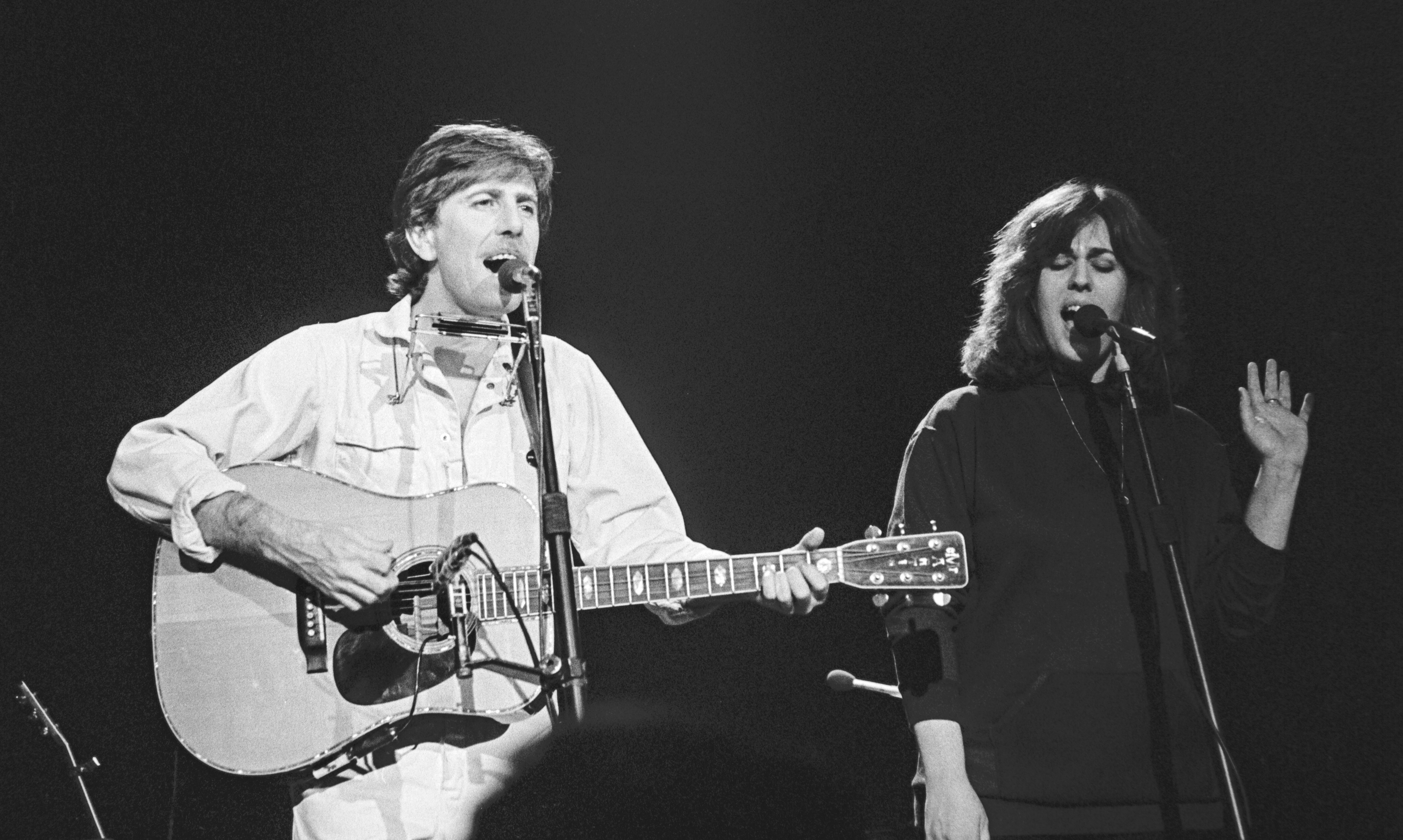
Nash performing with Leah Kunkel in 1980

In 1971, Nash released his first solo album Songs For Beginners on Atlantic Records. His second album Wild Tales, was released in 1974. Later, Nash would perform these two albums live on tour in 2019.

In 1979, Nash co-founded Musicians United for Safe Energy which is against the expansion of nuclear power. MUSE put on the educational fundraising No Nukes events. In 2007 the group recorded a music video of a new version of the Buffalo Springfield song "For What It's Worth".

=== Hollies reunion ===
Nash briefly rejoined the Hollies in 1983 (to mark their 20th anniversary) to record two albums, What Goes Around... and Reunion. In 1993, Nash again reunited with the Hollies to record a new version of "Peggy Sue Got Married" that featured lead vocal by Buddy Holly (taken from an alternative version of the song given to Nash by Holly's widow Maria Eleana Holly)—this Buddy Holly & the Hollies recording opened the Not Fade Away tribute album to Holly by various artists.

=== Later years ===
In 2005, Nash collaborated with Norwegian musicians A-ha on the songs "Over the Treetops" (penned by Paul Waaktaar-Savoy) and "Cosy Prisons" (penned by Magne Furuholmen) for the Analogue recording. In 2006, Nash worked with David Gilmour and David Crosby on the title track of David Gilmour's third solo album, On an Island. In March 2006, the album was released and quickly reached No. 1 on the UK charts. Nash and Crosby subsequently toured the UK with Gilmour, singing backup on "On an Island", "The Blue", "Shine On You Crazy Diamond", and "Find the Cost of Freedom".

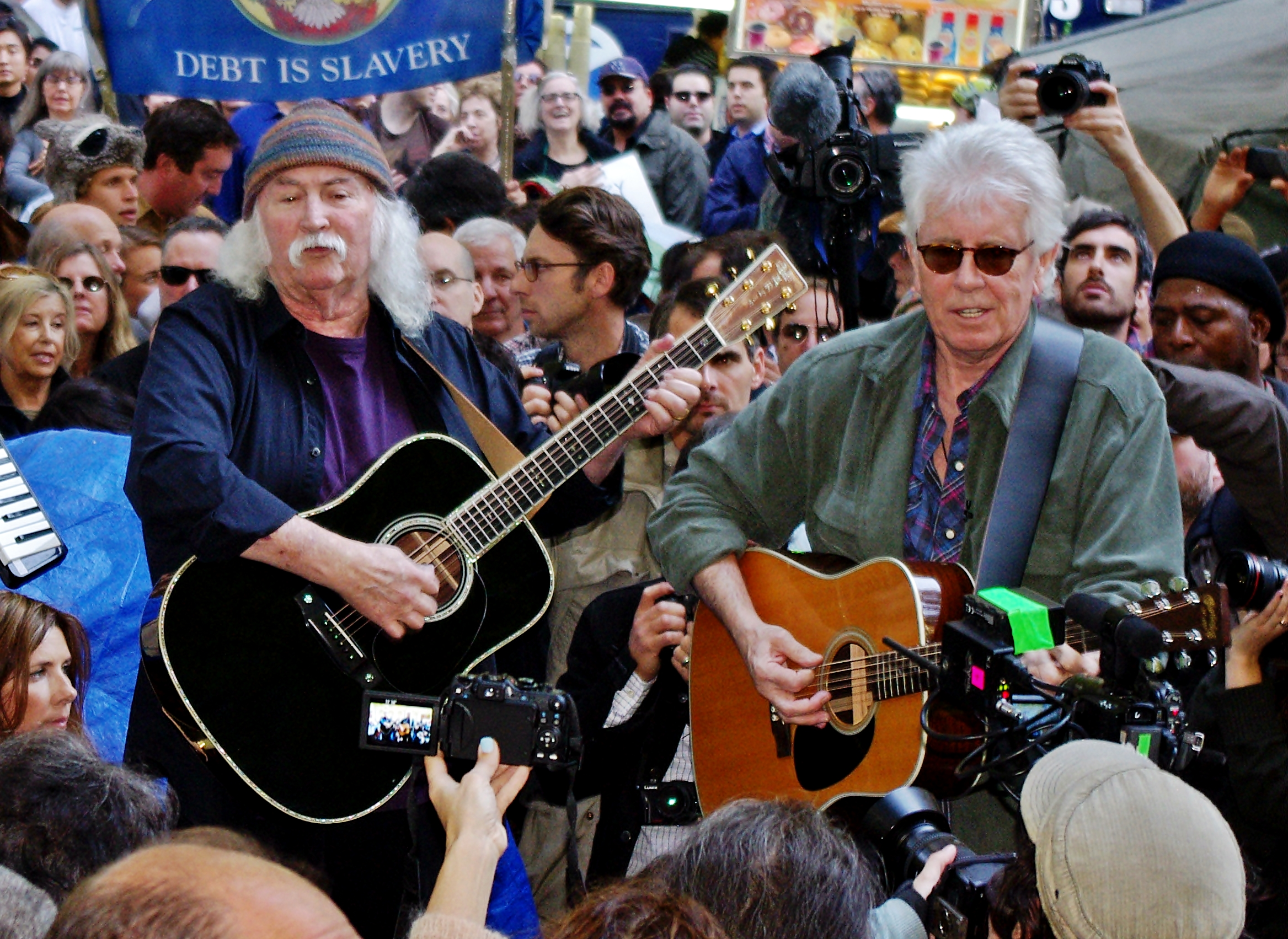
David Crosby and Nash playing Occupy Wall Street, November 2011

In addition to his political songs Nash has written many songs on other themes he cares about such as of nature and ecology—beginning with the Hollies' "Signs That Will Never Change" (first recorded by the Everly Brothers in 1966)—later CSNY's "Clear Blue Skies", plus anti-nuclear-waste-dumping ("Barrel of Pain"), anti-war ("Soldiers of Peace") and social issues ("Prison Song").

Nash appeared on the season 7 finale of American Idol singing "Teach Your Children" with Brooke White.

In 2010, Nash was inducted a second time to the Rock and Roll Hall of Fame, this time as a member of the Hollies. He was appointed OBE "for services to music and charitable activities", becoming an Officer of the Order of the British Empire in the Diplomatic and Overseas Division of the Queen's Birthday Honours List on 12 June 2010. Nash received the title of George Eastman Honorary Scholar at the George Eastman House on 22 January 2011, in Rochester, New York.

Nash contributed a cover of "Raining in My Heart" to the 2011 tribute album Rave on Buddy Holly.

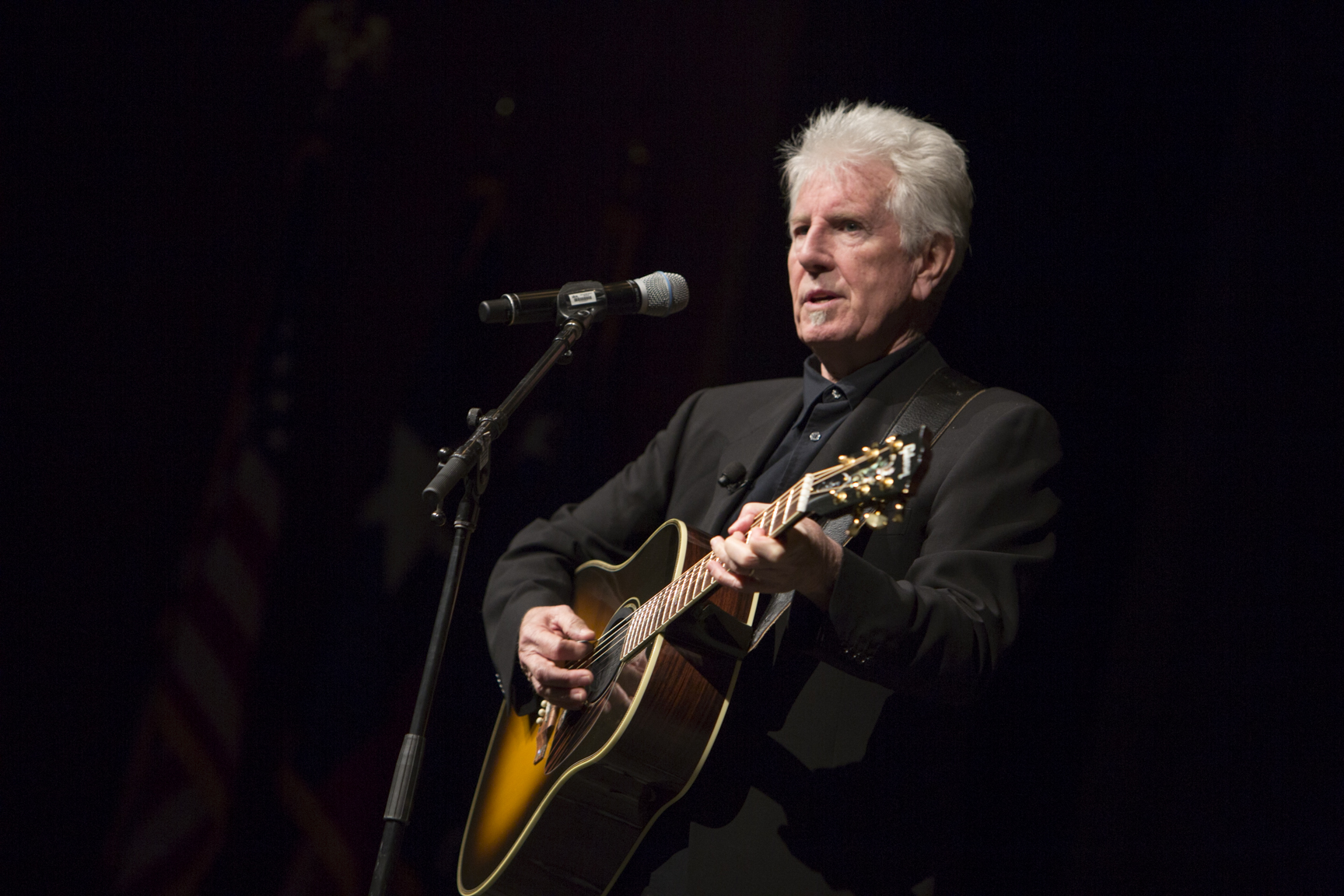
Nash playing at the LBJ Presidential Library in 2014

On 22 January 2016, Nash announced the forthcoming release on 15 April 2016 of his new studio album entitled This Path Tonight (his first collection of new songs in fourteen years) and shared the title track from it through MOJO magazine's website. On 4 February 2016, Rolling Stone magazine unveiled a new song from the new album, the reflective "Encore," the tender tune that wraps up Nash's new album. Upon the upcoming release of his new studio album in April 2016, Nash planned a solo tour from 25 March 2016 at the Byron Bay Bluesfest in Australia, continuing United States on 22 April 2016 at Saban Theatre, Beverly Hills, California, to visit Europe starting from the UK on 21 May 2016 at the Albert Hall, Manchester and ending 14 June 2016 at the Alte Oper Hall, Frankfurt, Germany.

He was still touring in the fall of 2017, performing in New Jersey and New York in September.

On 29 June 2018, Rhino Records released the two-disk box set Over The Years, a 30-track collection of Nash's demos made from 1968 to 1980, featuring highlights from the CSN debut album Crosby, Stills & Nash ("Marrakesh Express"), CSNY follow-up Déjà Vu ("Our House", "Teach Your Children"), song selections from subsequent CSN albums, four tracks from Nash's 1971 solo album Songs For Beginners, with "Better Days" and "I Used To Be King" presented as unreleased mixes. The most recent recording on the compilation is "Myself at Last" from Nash's 2016 solo album This Path Tonight. The second disc in this set features 15 demo recordings, 12 of which have never been released.

Nash and Stephen Stills, backed by Dawes, reunited for a performance of "Teach Your Children" at the January 30, 2025 Fire Aid benefit concert in Los Angeles. It marked the first time since 2016 that Nash and Stills have performed together.

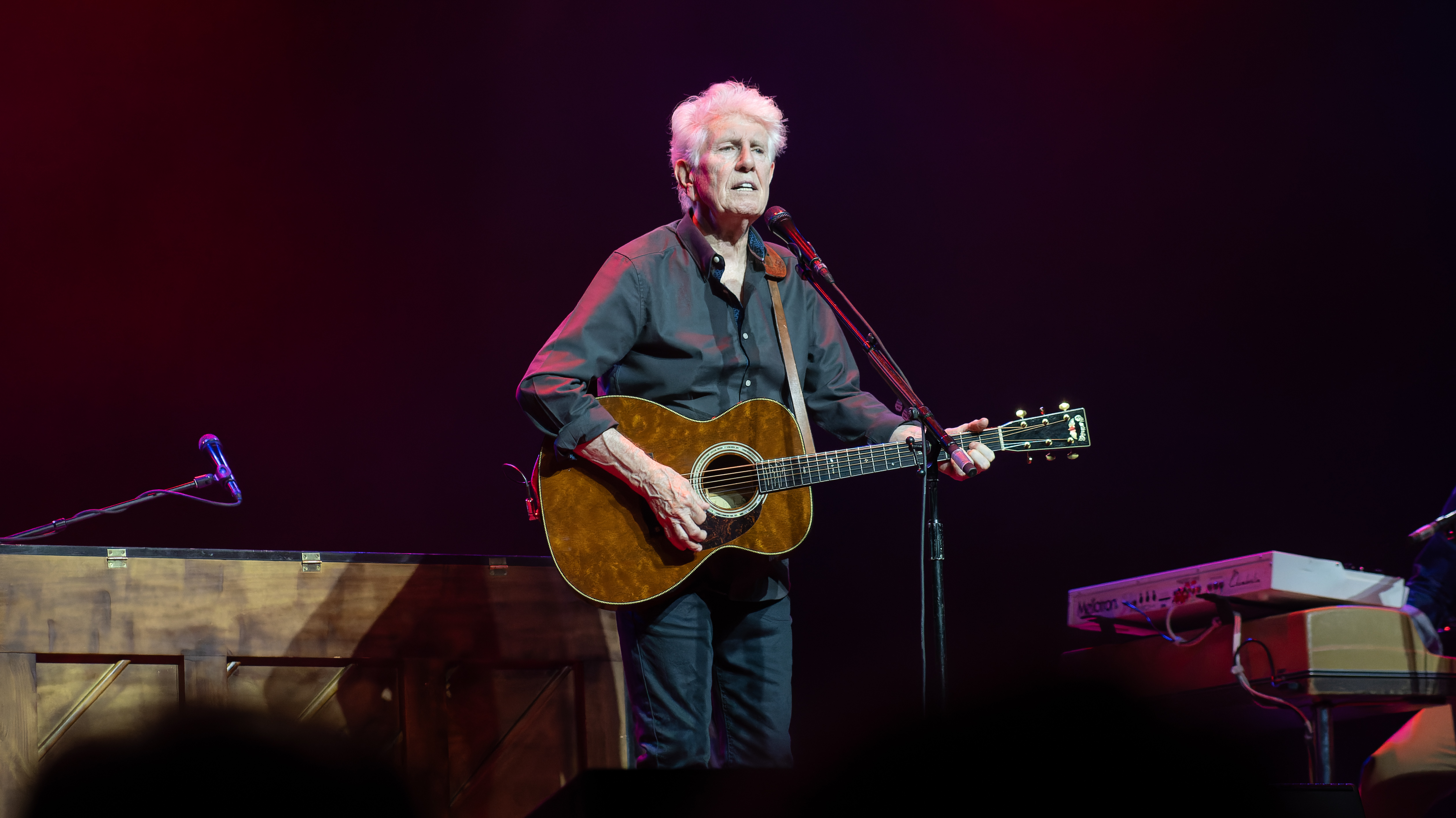
Graham Nash at De La Warr Pavilion, Bexhill, Wednesday 30 August 2023

== Photography career ==
Interested in photography as a child, Nash began to collect photographs in the early 1970s. Having acquired more than a thousand prints by 1976, Nash hired Graham Howe as his photography curator. In 1978 through 1984 a touring exhibition of selections from the Graham Nash Collection toured to more than a dozen museums worldwide. Nash decided to sell his 2,000 print collection through Sotheby's auction house in 1990 where it set an auction record for the highest grossing sale of a single private collection of photography. Nash said that some of the auction profit would be given to the Los Angeles County Museum of Art for the acquisition of contemporary photographs.

In 2010, 21st Editions published a monograph titled "Love, Graham Nash" which includes facsimiles of his lyrics paired with signed photographs by Graham Nash and printed by Nash Editions.

=== Early digital fine art printing ===
==== Experimenting ====
In the late 1980s, Nash began to experiment with digital images of his photography on Macintosh computers with the assistance of R. Mac Holbert who at that time was the tour manager for Crosby, Stills and Nash as well as handling computer/technical matters for the band. Nash ran into the problem common with all personal computers running graphics software during that period: he could create very sophisticated detailed images on the computer, but there was no output device (computer printer) capable of reproducing what he saw on the computer screen. Nash and Holbert initially experimented with early commercial printers that were then becoming available and printed many images on the large format Fujix inkjet printers at UCLA's JetGraphix digital output centre. When Fuji decided to stop supporting the printers, John Bilotta, who was running JetGraphix, recommended that Nash and Holbert look into the Iris printer, a new large format continuous-tone inkjet printer built for prepress proofing by IRIS Graphics, Inc. Through IRIS Graphics national sales rep Steve Boulter, Nash also met programmer David Coons, a colour engineer for Disney, who was already using the IRIS printer there to print images from Disney's new digital animation system.

Coons worked off hours at Disney to produce large images of 16 of Nash's photographic portraits on Arches watercolour paper using Disney's in-house model 3024 IRIS printer for a 24 April 1990 show at Simon Lowinsky gallery. Since most of the original negatives and prints had been lost in shipment to a book publisher, Coons had to scan contact sheets and enhance the images so they could be printed in large format. He used software he had written to output the photographic images to the IRIS printer, a machine designed to work with proprietary prepress computer systems.

In July 1990, Nash purchased an IRIS Graphics 3047 inkjet printer for $126,000 and set it up in a small carriage house in Manhattan Beach, California near Los Angeles. David Coons and Steve Boulter used it to print an even larger November 1990 show of Nash's work for Parco Stores in Tokyo. The show entitled Sunlight on Silver was a series of 35 celebrity portraits by Nash which were 3 feet by 4 feet in an edition of 50 prints per image, a total of 1,750 images. Subsequently, Nash exhibited his photographs at the Museum of Photographic Arts in San Diego and elsewhere.

==== Nash Editions ====
In 1991, Nash agreed to fund Mac Holbert to start a fine art digital-based printing company using the IRIS Graphics 3047 printer sitting in Nash's Manhattan Beach, California carriage house. Holbert retired as road manager for Crosby, Stills and Nash so that he could run the company. It opened its doors on 1 July 1991 with the name of Nash Editions Ltd. Early employees included David Coons, John Bilotta and a serigraphic print maker named Jack Duganne. They worked to further adapt the IRIS printer to fine art printing, experimenting with ink sets to try to overcome the fast-fading nature of IRIS prints, and even going as far as sawing off part of the print heads so they could be moved back to clear thicker printing paper stocks (voiding the $126,000 machine's warranty). Nash and Holbert decided to call their fine art prints "digigraphs" although Jack Duganne coined the name "Giclée" for these types of prints. The company is still in operation and currently uses Epson-based large format printers.

In 2005, Nash donated the original IRIS Graphics 3047 printer and Nash Editions ephemera to the National Museum of American History, a Smithsonian Institution.

== Personal life ==
Nash was married to his first wife, Rose Eccles, from 1964 until 1966. As part of an inside joke, her surname inspired the 1968 song "Jennifer Eccles", and a jocular verse about Jennifer Eccles was also included in the 1968 song "Lily the Pink". Nash was married to his second wife, actress Susan Sennett, from 1978 until he left her for artist Amy Grantham in 2016. Sennett, the mother of his three now-adult children, divorced Nash in 2016 and died of cancer in September 2020. After moving to New York City, Nash married Grantham in April 2019.

Nash released an autobiography in September 2013 called Wild Tales: A Rock & Roll Life, published by Crown Publishing. Photographs that he took during his career are on display as an art collection at the San Francisco Art Exchange. In interviews pertaining to both the memoir and art exhibit, he mentioned the impact of Canadian-American musician Joni Mitchell, with whom he had a relationship between 1968 and 1970 in California. He also had a brief relationship with American musician Rita Coolidge, as did his bandmate Stephen Stills.

Nash became a naturalized citizen of the United States in 1978. He endorsed Bernie Sanders in the 2016 Democratic Party presidential primaries. In October 2020, he revealed that he had recently started practising Transcendental Meditation after American filmmaker David Lynch paid for him and his wife to study it as a gift. He said of the practice, "Quite frankly, I'm 78 years old and I wish I'd been doing it for 50 years."

On 7 January 2024 Nash was the guest for BBC Radio 4's Desert Island Discs. His choices included "Be-Bop-a-Lula" by Gene Vincent, "Don't Give Up" by Peter Gabriel and Kate Bush, and Adagio for Strings by Samuel Barber. His favourite disc was "A Day in the Life" by the Beatles, which he described as "the greatest song that was ever written, I think."

He used to have a home in San Francisco.

== Discography ==
See also discographies for Crosby Stills Nash & Young, The Hollies and Crosby & Nash.

=== With The Hollies ===
==== Albums ====
Albums by the Hollies with Nash's contributions
Title	Album details
Stay with The Hollies	Released: January 1964
In The Hollies Style	Released: November 1964
Hollies	Released: September 1965
Would You Believe?	Released: June 1966
Bus Stop	Released: October 1966
For Certain Because	Released: 9 December 1966
Evolution	Released: June 1967
Butterfly	Released: November 1967
What Goes Around...	Released: July 1983

==== Singles ====
Singles by the Hollies with Nash's contributions
Title	Year
"(Ain't That) Just Like Me"	1963
"Searchin'"	1963
"Stay"	1963
"Just One Look"	1964
"Here I Go Again"	1964
"Lucille"	1964
"We're Through"	1964
"Yes I Will"	1965
"I'm Alive"	1965
"Look Through Any Window"	1965
"If I Needed Someone"	1965
"I Can't Let Go"	1966
"Very Last Day"	1966
"Bus Stop"	1966
"After the Fox" (with Peter Sellers)	1966
"Stop Stop Stop"	1966
"What's Wrong with the Way I Live"	1966
"On a Carousel"	1967
"Pay You Back with Interest"	1967
"Carrie Anne"	1967
"Peculiar Situation"	1967
"Kill Me Quick"	1967
"That's My Desire"	1967
"King Midas in Reverse"	1967
"Just One Look" (re-release)	1967
"Dear Eloise"	1967
"Jennifer Eccles"	1968
"Step Inside"	1968
"Do the Best You Can"	1968
"Listen to Me"	1968
"Holliedaze"	1981
"Take My Love and Run"	1981
"Stop in the Name of Love"	1983
"If the Lights Go Out"	1983

==== EPs ====
EPs by the Hollies with Nash's contributions
Title	EP details
The Hollies	Released: June 1964; Label: Parlophone (GEP 8909); Format: mono 7" 45 RPM
Just One Look	Released: July 1964; Label: Parlophone (GEP 8911); Format: mono 7" 45 RPM
Here I Go Again	Released: October 1964; Label: Parlophone (GEP 8915); Format: mono 7" 45 RPM
We're Through	Released: December 1964; Label: Parlophone (GEP 8927); Format: mono 7" 45 RPM
In The Hollies Style	Released: April 1965; Label: Parlophone (GEP 8934); Format: mono 7" 45 RPM
I'm Alive	Released: September 1965; Label: Parlophone (GEP 8942); Format: mono 7" 45 RPM
I Can't Let Go	Released: June 1966; Label: Parlophone (GEP 8951); Format: mono 7" 45 RPM

=== Solo ===
==== Studio albums ====
List of studio albums, with selected details, chart positions and certifications
Title	Album details	Peak chart positions										Certifications/Sales
Title	Album details	UK	AUS	CAN	GER	NLD	NOR	SWE	US CB	US RW	US	Certifications/Sales
Songs for Beginners	Released: 28 May 1971; Label: Atlantic	13	11	11	—	4	13	10	10	11	15	US: Gold
Wild Tales	Released: 2 January 1974; Label: Atlantic	—	—	62	—	—	—	—	22	24	34	US: 150,000
Earth & Sky	Released: 15 February 1980; Label: EMI	—	—	—	—	—	—	—	106	104	117	
Innocent Eyes	Released: 27 March 1986; Label: Atlantic	—	91	—	—	—	—	—	123	—	136	
Songs for Survivors	Released: 30 April 2002; Label: Artemis	—	—	—	—	—	—	—	—	—	—	
This Path Tonight	Released: 15 April 2016; Label: Blue Castle	41	—	—	48	22	27	58	—	—	93	
Now	Released: 19 May 2023; Label: BMG	97	—	—	28	—	—	—	—	—	—	
"—" denotes items that did not chart or were not released in that territory.

==== Live ====
List of live albums, with selected details
Title	Album details
Graham Nash: Live – Songs for Beginners / Wild Tales	Released: May 2022; Label: Proper

==== Compilations ====
List of compilations, with selected details and chart positions
Title	Album details	Peak chart positions			
Title	Album details	UK	BEL	NLD	SPA
Reflections	Released: 3 February 2009; Label: Rhino	—	—	—	—
Over the Years	Released: 29 June 2018; Label: Rhino	27	55	78	94
"—" denotes items that did not chart or were not released in that territory.

==== Singles ====
List of singles, with selected chart positions
Year	Title	Peak chart positions							Album
Year	Title	US	US CB	US RW	AUS	CAN	GER	BEL	Album
1971	"Chicago"	35	29	29	32	19	45	29	Songs for Beginners
1971	"Military Madness"	73	66	73	20	57	—	—	Songs for Beginners
1971	"I Used to Be a King"	111	—	117	—	—	—	—	Songs for Beginners
1972	"War Song" (with Neil Young & the Stray Gators)	61	52	—	—	40	—	—	non-album single
1973	"Prison Song"	—	—	—	—	—	—	—	Wild Tales
1974	"On the Line"	—	—	—	—	—	—	—	Wild Tales
1974	"Grave Concern"	—	—	—	—	—	—	—	Wild Tales
1979	"In the 80's"	—	—	—	—	—	—	—	Earth & Sky
1980	"Magical Child"	—	—	—	—	—	—	—	Earth & Sky
1980	"Out of the Island"	—	—	—	—	—	—	—	Earth & Sky
1986	"Innocent Eyes"	84	85	—	96	—	—	—	Innocent Eyes
1986	"Chippin' Away"	—	—	—	—	—	—	—	Innocent Eyes
2002	"I'll Be There for You"	—	—	—	—	—	—	—	Songs for Survivors
2002	"Lost Another One"	—	—	—	—	—	—	—	Songs for Survivors
2011	"Almost Gone" (with James Raymond)	—	—	—	—	—	—	—	non-album single
2016	"Another Broken Heart"	—	—	—	—	—	—	—	This Path Tonight
2016	"This Path Tonight"	—	—	—	—	—	—	—	This Path Tonight
2016	"Myself at Last"	—	—	—	—	—	—	—	This Path Tonight
2020	"Vote"	—	—	—	—	—	—	—	non-album single
"—" denotes a recording that did not chart. "Innocent Eyes" also reached number 14 on the Billboard Mainstream Rock chart. "I'll Be There for You" reached number 28 on the Billboard Adult Contemporary chart.

=== Other appearances ===
==== Studio ====
Year	Song	Album
1982	"Love Is the Reason"	Fast Times at Ridgemont High
1986	"Wings to Fly"	American Anthem

==== Live ====
Year	Song	Type	Album
2019	"Our House"	album	Joni 75: A Birthday Celebration
2022	"So Sad (To Watch Good Love Go Bad)" (with Chris Stills)	video	Hey Doll Baby

== Bibliography ==
- Eye to Eye: Photographs by Graham Nash by Nash and Garrett White (2004) Steidl, ISBN 978-3882439601
- Off the Record: Songwriters on Songwriting by Graham Nash (2002) Andrews McMeel Publishing, ISBN 978-0740726781
- Love, Graham Nash (2 vols. 2009)
- Wild Tales: A Rock & Roll Life by Graham Nash (17 September 2013), Penguin, ISBN 978-0241968048
- Our House by Graham Nash (2021), Bloomsbury Academic, ISBN 9781493061549.
