= Over the Years =

Greatest hits album by Graham Nash
- Released: 2018
- Genre: Folk rock
- Length: 92:59
- Label: Atlantic, Rhino
- Producer: Graham Nash

Graham Nash chronology
This Path Tonight (2016)	Over the Years (2018)	Now (2023)

Over the Years is a 2018 retrospective compilation album from Graham Nash. The album consists of two discs, one containing Nash's greatest hits including his work with CSNY, CSN and as a duo with Crosby & Nash.

== Track listing ==
All tracks are written by Graham Nash, except where indicated.

The Songs
No.	Title	Writer(s)	Length
1.	"Marrakesh Express"		2:36
2.	"Military Madness"		3:29
3.	"Immigration Man"		3:00
4.	"Just a Song Before I Go"		2:14
5.	"I Used to Be a King"		4:39
6.	"Better Days"		3:50
7.	"Simple Man"		2:18
8.	"Teach Your Children"		2:55
9.	"Lady of the Island"		2:38
10.	"Wind on the Water"		4:00
11.	"Our House"		3:01
12.	"Cathedral"		5:18
13.	"Wasted on the Way"		2:58
14.	"Chicago / We Can Change the World"		4:01
15.	"Myself at Last"	Nash, Shane Fontayne	5:19

The Demos
No.	Title	Length
1.	"Marrakesh Express" (London, 1968)	2:42
2.	"Horses Through a Rainstorm" (London, 1968)	3:37
3.	"Teach Your Children" (Hollywood, 1969)	2:53
4.	"Pre-Road Downs" (Hollywood, 1969)	2:23
5.	"Our House" (San Francisco, 1969)	2:55
6.	"Right Between the Eyes" (San Francisco, 1969)	2:04
7.	"Sleep Song" (San Francisco, 1969)	3:03
8.	"Chicago" (Hollywood, 1970)	2:54
9.	"Man in the Mirror" (Hollywood, 1970)	3:03
10.	"Simple Man" (Hollywood, 1970)	2:54
11.	"I Miss You" (San Francisco, 1972)	2:11
12.	"You'll Never Be the Same" (San Francisco, 1972)	2:42
13.	"Wind on the Water" (San Francisco, 1975)	3:39
14.	"Just a Song Before I Go" (San Francisco, 1976)	2:42
15.	"Wasted on the Way" (Oahu, 1980)	2:51

== Charts ==
Chart performance for Over the Years
Chart (2018)	Peak position
Belgian Albums (Ultratop Flanders)	55
Dutch Albums (Album Top 100)	78
Spanish Albums (PROMUSICAE)	94
UK Albums (OCC)	22
