= Souljacker Part I =

2001 single by Eels

"Souljacker part I"

Single by Eels

from the album Souljacker
- Released: 10 September 2001 (UK)
- Genre: Hard rock
- Length: 3:15
- Label: DreamWorks

Eels singles chronology
"Flyswatter" (2000)	"Souljacker part I" (2001)	"Hey Man (Now You're Really Living)" (2005)

Alternative cover
- CD 2 cover

"Souljacker Part I" is a song by American rock band Eels. It was the only single released from their 2001 album Souljacker.

== Music video ==
The German filmmaker Wim Wenders shot a video of the song with the band performing in an abandoned East-Berlin prison in 2001.

== Release ==
"Souljacker Part I" reached number 30 in the UK Albums Chart.

It has been performed live the third-most times of any Eels song, at over 350 times as of May 2025.

The song is included in the 2007 films Hot Fuzz and The Condemned, the 2011 film Drive Angry, and in the pilot episode of the Showtime series United States of Tara.

== Track listings ==
CD 1

1. "Souljacker Part I"
2. "I Write the B-Sides"
3. "Can't Help Falling in Love"
4. "Souljacker Part I" (video)

CD 2

1. "Souljacker Part I"
2. "Jennifer Eccles"
3. "My Beloved Monstrosity"
4. "My Beloved Spider" (hidden track)

7" vinyl

1. "Souljacker part I"
2. "I Write the B-Sides"
