= Now (Graham Nash album) =

Studio album by Graham Nash
- Released: 19 May 2023
- Recorded: 2020–2022
- Studio: Studio 145, Brooklyn Recording, Don Caldwell Studios
- Genre: Folk rock
- Length: 38:43
- Label: BMG
- Producer: Graham Nash; Todd Caldwell

Graham Nash chronology
Over the Years (2018)	Now (2023)

Now is the seventh solo studio album by British singer-songwriter Graham Nash, released on 19 May 2023 through BMG Rights Management. It was co-produced by Nash and Todd Caldwell. It is Nash's first album of new material in seven years and received generally favorable reviews from critics.

== Critical reception ==
Professional ratings
Aggregate scores
Source	Rating
Metacritic	72/100
Review scores
Source	Rating
American Songwriter	4/5 stars
Mojo	3/5 stars
musicOMH	4/5 stars
PopMatters	6/10
Record Collector	4/5 stars
Tom Hull – on the Web	B−
Uncut	4/5 stars
Under the Radar	7/10

Now received a score of 72 out of 100 based on six critics' reviews on review aggregator Metacritic, indicating "generally favorable" reception. Michael Gallucci of Ultimate Classic Rock felt that the album is "marked by the inevitable passing of time" and Nash "finds meaning, and something to say, in even the smallest of everyday occurrences". Ultimately he felt that he as Nash is "backed often by the sparest of arrangements, however, much of it leans toward the mundane." Lee Zimmerman of American Songwriter found the "material is softly lit and effortlessly assured, conveying the calming and caressing sound that all so frequently added its soothing sobriety to CSN and CSNY". Zimmerman also remarked on the "rallying cries" in multiple songs ("Golden Idols", "Stars & Stripes" and "Stand Up"), with other tracks like "Buddy's Back" with his former Hollies bandmate Allan Clarke "betray[ing] more than a hint of nostalgia".

Reviewing the album for musicOMH, Steven Johnson called it "moving" as well as a "generous, warm-hearted set of 13 songs, a distillation of his current interests and musical aesthetic". Johnson wrote that Nash's "longstanding themes are pursued amid uncomplicated arrangements and clear-sighted melodies", although there is also "grit and anger among the smoothness". Erin Osmon of Uncut wrote that the "personal and political meet" on the "soul-searching" album, one that "doesn't stray too far from the magic of his wheelhouse", although commenting that Nash "does update his propensities for the modern day, singing of current political turmoil, environmental destruction and his love for wife".

== Commercial performance ==
On the midweek UK Albums Chart dated 22 May 2023, Now placed at number 46, debuting at number 97 on the final chart.

== Track listing ==
Now track listing
No.	Title	Writer(s)	Length
1.	"Right Now"	Graham Nash	3:06
2.	"A Better Life"	George Merrill/Graham Nash	3:29
3.	"Golden Idols"	Graham Nash	3:16
4.	"Stars & Stripes"	Graham Nash	3:22
5.	"Love of Mine"	Graham Nash	2:46
6.	"Theme from Pastoral"	Alan Prices	0:47
7.	"In a Dream"		2:14
8.	"Stand Up"	Graham Nash	3:02
9.	"It Feels Like Home"	Joe Vitale/Graham Nash	3:45
10.	"Buddy's Back"	Graham Nash	2:44
11.	"Follow Your Heart"	Graham Nash	3:38
12.	"I Watched It All Come Down"	Graham Nash	3:14
13.	"When It Comes to You"	Graham Nash/Todd Caldwell	3:12
Total length:			38:43

== Personnel ==
- Graham Nash – vocals, acoustic guitar (3, 4, 10), harmonica (5, 9, 11) nylon string guitar (5), hand claps (10)
- Todd Caldwell – Hammond B3 organ (1, 2, 3, 4, 8, 13), piano (1, 3, 7, 13), electric piano (2, 3, 4, 5, 8, 9, 11), celeste (10), hand claps (10), string arrangements (6, 7, 12)
- Shane Fontayne – electric guitar (1, 4, 8, 10), lap steel (1, 3), mandolin (4), slide guitar (4)
- Thad Debrock – electric guitar (1, 2, 3, 13), acoustic guitar (1, 3, 9, 10, 13), pedal steel (1, 2, 4, 9), harmonium (1, 9, 11), mandolin (2, 3, 9), baritone guitar (4, 13), nylon string guitar (11), bass (11)
- Adam Minkoff – bass (1, 2, 3, 4, 6, 7, 8, 9, 13), drums (1, 2, 3, 4, 6, 7, 8, 9, 13), percussion (1, 3, 5, 7)
- Allan Clarke – vocals (10)
- Brett Bass – upright bass (10)
- Toby Caldwell – drums (10)
- Beth Callen – hand claps (10)
- Hiroko Taguchi – violin (6, 7, 12)
- Whitney La Grange – violin (6, 7, 12)
- Jocelin Pan – viola (6, 7, 12)
- Alon Bisk – cello (6, 7, 12)
- Michael Olatuja – bass (6, 7, 12)
- Andy Taub - engineering
- Sam Wahl - engineering
- Michael Nunn - engineering
- Francis Haines - engineering
- Kevin Killen - mixing
- Bob Ludwig - mastering
- Amy Grantham - photography
- Norman Moore - art direction & design

== Charts ==
Chart performance for Now
Chart (2023)	Peak position
Belgian Albums (Ultratop Flanders)	120
German Albums (Offizielle Top 100)	28
Scottish Albums (OCC)	14
Swiss Albums (Schweizer Hitparade)	88
UK Albums (OCC)	97
UK Independent Albums (OCC)	1
