= Here I Go Again (The Hollies song) =

1964 single by the Hollies

- Swedish picture sleeve

Single by the Hollies
- B-side: "Baby That's All"
- Released: 15 May 1964
- Recorded: 13 April 1964
- Studio: EMI, London
- Genre: Beat
- Length: 2:19
- Label: Parlophone; Imperial
- Songwriter(s): Mort Shuman; Clive Westlake
- Producer(s): Ron Richards

The Hollies singles chronology
"Just One Look" (1964)	"Here I Go Again" (1964)	"We're Through" (1964)

"Here I Go Again" is a song by British band the Hollies, released as a single in May 1964.

== Background and release ==
"Here I Go Again" was written by Mort Shuman and Clive Westlake. It was recorded on 13 April 1964 at EMI Studios and released as a single a month later by Parlophone with the B-side "Baby That's All", written by the Hollies' Allan Clarke, Tony Hicks and Graham Nash under the pseudonym Chester Mann. The US release by Imperial Records in June 1964 saw it paired with a different B-side, a cover of Little Richard's "Lucille".

It was their first original single, with their previous four singles having all been covers. An EP including the song was later released in October 1964, also entitled Here I Go Again. In the US, an album entitled Here I Go Again was released in June 1964 and was largely based on the UK album Stay with the Hollies.

The single performed well in the UK, continuing their success there, and peaked at number 4 on the Record Retailer chart. It performed particularly well on the Mersey Beat chart, topping it in the final week of June 1964. However, in the US, "Here I Go Again" failed to chart on the Billboard Hot 100 or Cash Box Top 100 charts, instead bubbling under on both.

Reviewed in Record Mirror, "Here I Go Again" was described as "[having] a "Just One Look" flavour, and there's a grow-on-you melody on the vibrant beat ballad. Maybe not as powerful as their last few, but a huge hit on their name".

== Track listings ==
7": Parlophone / R 5137

1. "Here I Go Again" – 2:19
2. "Baby That's All" – 2:16

7": Imperial / 66044 (US)

1. "Here I Go Again" – 2:17
2. "Lucille" – 2:20

== Charts ==
Chart (1964)	Peak position
Australia (Kent Music Report)	24
New Zealand (Lever Hit Parade)	5
Sweden (Kvällstoppen)	17
Sweden (Tio i Topp)	8
UK Disc Top 30	3
UK Melody Maker Top 50	3
UK Mersey Beat Top 20	1
UK New Musical Express Top 30	4
UK Record Retailer Top 50	4
US Bubbling Under the Hot 100 (Billboard)	107
US Cash Box Looking Ahead	118
