= Dear Eloise (song) =

1967 single by the Hollies

- Swedish picture sleeve

Single by the Hollies

from the album Butterfly
- B-side: "When Your Lights Turned On"
- Released: 3 November 1967
- Recorded: 26 September 1967
- Studio: EMI, London
- Genre: Bubblegum pop; psychedelic pop; vaudeville pop
- Length: 3:03
- Label: Epic
- Songwriters: Allan Clarke; Tony Hicks; Graham Nash
- Producer: Ron Richards

The Hollies singles chronology
"King Midas in Reverse" (1967)	"Dear Eloise" (1967)	"Jennifer Eccles" (1968)

Audio
- "Dear Eloise" on YouTube

"Dear Eloise" is a song by English pop band the Hollies, written by members Allan Clarke, Tony Hicks and Graham Nash. The song was conceived after Clarke wrote the lyrics on the stairs of the EMI Studios in London. Musically, the song reflected a venture towards psychedelia with elements of bubblegum- and vaudeville pop. Lyrically, it refers to a letter written to an ex-lover. It features several tempo and a slow intro and outro that features Nash on harmonium and vocals. "Dear Eloise" was recorded at EMI on 26 September 1967 with Ron Richards producing.

In England, "Dear Eloise" received its first release on the Hollies seventh studio album Butterfly through Parlophone on 1 November 1967. In the US, Epic rush-released "Dear Eloise" as a single on 3 November 1967 with "When Your Lights Turned On" to coincide with a tour of the US by the Hollies. It achieved mild commercial success in the US, reaching number 50 on the Billboard Hot 100, but was more successful in continental Europe where it reached number one in Sweden. "Dear Eloise" received positive reviews upon release, with praise for the arrangement, and has retrospectively been considered one of the Hollies' few forays into psychedelia.

== Composition and recording ==
As with most of the Hollies other post-1966 hits, "Dear Eloise" was penned by vocalist Allan Clarke, lead guitarist Tony Hicks and rhythm guitarist Graham Nash. Clarke recalled that he wrote the lyrics to the song's on the steps of the stairs in front of EMI Studios in London "in about 20 minutes" during the preparation for a meeting and that the song "developed from there". Musically, the song reflected a venture towards psychedelia, with journalist Heather Phares writing that it distilled "the trippier, cheerier" parts of the Beatles' Sgt. Pepper's Lonely Hearts Club Band into "three minutes of bubblegum vaudeville pop". Terry Staunton classified "Dear Eloise" as psychedelic pop. According to Cub Koda of AllMusic, "Dear Eloise" was built around "glowing harmonies" and "tempo shifts around Moon/June lyrics". Al Quaglieri described the song's lyrics as a "musical consolation note to an ex-lover, as does Andrew Darlington who further outlines them as epistolary.

With a runtime of 3:03, "Dear Eloise" features three distinctive sections containing several stops and tempo changes. The middle part has the band break into "urgent group harmonies", and reflected the Hollies at their most "exuberant". The intro and outro of the song contrast to the rest of the song, with musicologist Mike Segretto believing them to be an "acid sea shanty". These sections feature an unaccompanied Nash on vocals and harmonium. The intro in particular, breaks down with Nash's vocals fading, before drummer Bobby Elliott's spoken word counting leads into the song's middle part. According to Elliott, the harmonium was provided by EMI Studios "probably free of charge", with producer Ron Richards further stating that the track was recorded during a period of "flower power" where the band "experimented with different things". "Dear Eloise" was taped in one take at EMI Studios on 26 September 1967, and was produced by Richards with Peter Brown engineering. "Elevated Observation" was recorded during the same session.

== Release and commercial performance ==
"Dear Eloise" was originally released by Parlophone in the UK on 1 November 1967, when it was featured as the opening track of the Hollies seventh studio album Butterfly. In the US, Epic rush-released "Dear Eloise" as a single on 3 November 1967, (Note: Catalogue number Epic 5-10251.) as their previous single "King Midas in Reverse" had underperformed in the charts. The B-side was "When Your Lights Turned On", which had previously been released on the Hollies fifth studio album Evolution in June 1967. The single release coincided with the Hollies American tour, which begun on 17 November 1967. (Note: The single release of "Dear Eloise" had its outro shortened.) Although "Dear Eloise" was readied for release as a British single in January 1968, it was ultimately not issued as the song was "considered a bit too strange for single release" there. "Dear Eloise" was also released as a single in mainland Europe.

This wasn't meant to be a single at all. We were always trying to do things sort of differently in those days to try to keep up with the Beatles and that was one of those type of songs.

— Allan Clarke (1990)

"Dear Eloise" entered the US Billboard Hot 100 on 3 December 1967 at number 86, before peaking at number 50 on 30 December. In the chart published by Record World, it fared better and peaked at number 40. In Canada, the single reached number 36. However, the single achieved its highest commercial success in Continental Europe, where it reached number two in Austria, number six in the Netherlands, and number eight in West Germany. "Dear Eloise" reached number one for one week on the Swedish Tio i Topp chart, becoming their fifth and penultimate number-one single in Sweden before "Jennifer Eccles".

The Hollies performed "Dear Eloise" and "Carrie Anne" during the 10 December 1967 episode of The Smothers Brothers Comedy Hour, and additionally recorded a music video for the track in America, in which a quill was depicted as writing the letter described in the song's lyrics. "Dear Eloise" and "King Midas in Reverse" both served as the title tracks for the American equivalent of Butterfly album, Dear Eloise / King Midas in Reverse, which Epic released on 27 November 1967. "Dear Eloise" has since been featured on several of the Hollies compilation albums, including The Hollies' Greatest Hits (1973), and Clarke, Hicks & Nash Years: The Complete Hollies April 1963 – October 1968 (2011).

== Reception and legacy ==
Upon release, "Dear Eloise" received critical acclaim. Writing for the New Musical Express, Allen Evans described "Dear Eloise" as being performed in the Hollies usual style, but noted the "distorted" and "slow" intro and outro sections as "quite effective". The staff reviewer for Billboard described "Dear Eloise" as having an "easily identifiable lyric" and a "rock beat", believing it would "prove one of the group's all-time biggest hits". Cash Box's review panel opined that the single contained "pounding orchestrations" alongside a "tremendous vocal sound", which contrasted to the "exotic beginning-finish" that they suggested was a statement that "might come in future Beatles sessions". "Dear Eloise" contained "lots of electronic fiddling and lots of beat" according to Record World.

According to Heather Phares, "Dear Eloise" was one of the tracks which exemplified the Hollies' "gifts as synthetists". Dean Johnson of The Boston Globe noted "Dear Eloise" as one of the Hollies' rare ventures into psychedelia, believing the band to otherwise "have as much to do with psychedelic music as Blue Cheer had to do with Chicago blues". Alan Niester of The Globe and Mail believed that "Dear Eloise", "King Midas in Reverse" and "The Air That I Breathe" represented a decline in chart success that contrasted to the Hollies' proficiency in the studio, which was "sharper than ever". Darlington described "Dear Eloise" as "wonderfully strange" and believed it was "rightly regarded as one of the Hollies' finest moments".

== Personnel ==
Personnel according to the liner notes of The Hollies at Abbey Road 1966-1970, unless otherwise noted.

The Hollies

- Allan Clarke – lead vocals
- Tony Hicks – lead guitar, vocals
- Graham Nash – guitar, harmonium, vocals
- Bernie Calvert – bass guitar
- Bobby Elliott – drums, spoken word (introduction)

Technical

- Ron Richards – producer
- Peter Brown – engineer

== Chart performance ==
=== Weekly charts ===
Chart (1967–1968)	Peak position
Austria (Disc Parade)	2
Australia (Go-Set)	27
Australia (Kent Music Report)	35
Canada (RPM)	36
Netherlands (Veronica Top 40)	8
Netherlands (Single Top 100)	6
New Zealand (Listener)	4
Sweden (Kvällstoppen)	7
Sweden (Tio i Topp)	1
US (Billboard Hot 100)	50
US (Cash Box Top 100)	53
US (Record World 100 Top Pops)	40
West Germany (Musikmarkt)	8

=== Year-end charts ===
Chart (1968)	Peak position
Netherlands (Veronica Top 40)	77

== See also ==
- The Hollies discography
- List of number-one singles on Tio i Topp
