= This Path Tonight =

Studio album by Graham Nash
- Released: 15 April 2016
- Studios: The Village Studios (Los Angeles, California); Mile End Studios (Sherman Oaks, California)
- Genre: Folk rock
- Length: 41:43
- Label: Blue Castle
- Producer: Shane Fontayne

Graham Nash chronology
Reflections (2009)	This Path Tonight (2016)	Over the Years (2018)

Professional ratings
Aggregate scores
Source	Rating
Metacritic	71/100
Review scores
Source	Rating
AllMusic	3.5/5 stars
Classic Rock	3.5/5 stars
Consequence of Sound	B
The Independent	3/5 stars
Mojo	3/5 stars
Record Collector	3/5 stars
Rolling Stone	3.5/5 stars
Uncut	7/10

This Path Tonight is the sixth solo studio album by British singer-songwriter Graham Nash, released on 15 April 2016. It is his first studio album in fourteen years.

== Background ==
When he wrote the tunes for This Path Tonight, Nash's separation from his wife Susan after 38 years of marriage was weighing most heavily on his mind. As he stated about the new album: "This Path Tonight is my emotional journey at this point in my life. [...] Many changes are happening and, as a musician, I'm trying to find the courage to face my future and grab a hold of it. [...] My producer [former Springsteen/Maria McKee sideman] Shane Fontayne and I wanted to make a funkier, more intimate feeling and started the album with the song "This Path Tonight"."

Nash also stated: "What a pleasure it was recording this album. Shane Fontayne and I had written 20 songs in a month and recorded them in eight days. I felt comfortable on day one even though I'd never met some of the musicians before that moment. Shane, who produced the album, put together a great band: Todd Caldwell (Hammond organ), Jay Bellerose (drums, percussion), Jennifer Condos (bass), Patrick Warren (piano), Shane Fontayne (guitars). My music has a different feel to my earlier albums although I hear echoes of each one. This journey of mine was one of self-discovery, of intense creation, of absolute passion. Enjoy!"

== Release ==
On 22 January 2016, Nash announced the forthcoming release on 15 April 2016 of his new studio album entitled This Path Tonight (his first collection of new songs in fourteen years) and shared the title track from it through the MOJO magazine's website.

On 4 February 2016, Rolling Stone magazine's website exclusively unveiled the reflective song "Encore", the tender tune that wraps up Nash's new album.

Nash released 3 bonus tracks for the album but they were for download only. To this day none of the 3 bonus tunes has been made available on any physical media worldwide.

== Track listing ==
All songs written by Graham Nash and Shane Fontayne.

This Path Tonight track listing
No.	Title	Length
1.	"This Path Tonight"	4:26
2.	"Myself at Last"	5:18
3.	"Cracks in the City"	3:41
4.	"Beneath the Waves"	4:01
5.	"Fire Down Below"	3:28
6.	"Another Broken Heart"	4:57
7.	"Target"	3:34
8.	"Golden Days"	3:38
9.	"Back Home"	4:48
10.	"Encore"	3:52
Total length:		41:43

Bonus tracks
No.	Title	Length
11.	"Mississippi Burning"	2:44
12.	"Watch Out for the Wind"	3:06
13.	"The Fall"	4:20

== Personnel ==
- Graham Nash – lead vocals, acoustic guitar, harmonica
- Todd Caldwell – Hammond organ
- Patrick Warren – acoustic piano, keyboards
- Shane Fontayne – acoustic guitar, electric guitars, backing vocals, producer, mixing
- Jennifer Condos – bass guitar
- Jay Bellerose – drums, percussion
- Shane Barakan – backing vocals
- Cynthia Bass – backing vocals
- Arnaé Batson – backing vocals
- Brenda Lee Eager – backing vocals
- Kevin Madigan – recording, mixing
- Bernie Grundman – mastering at Bernie Grundman Mastering (Hollywood, California)
- Josh Gonzales – guitar technician
- Kevin O'Connor – drum technician
- Brian Porizek – art direction, design
- Amy Grantham – photography

== Charts ==
Chart performance for This Path Tonight
Chart (2016)	Peak position
Belgian Albums (Ultratop Flanders)	43
Belgian Albums (Ultratop Wallonia)	63
Dutch Albums (Album Top 100)	22
French Albums (SNEP)	108
Irish Albums (IRMA)	69
Italian Albums (FIMI)	34
Spanish Albums (Promusicae)	69
Swedish Albums (Sverigetopplistan)	58
Swiss Albums (Schweizer Hitparade)	57
UK Albums (Official Charts)	41
US Billboard 200	93
