= In the Hollies Style =

Studio album by the Hollies
- Released: November 1964
- Recorded: 13 April – 25 August 1964
- Studios: EMI, London
- Genres: Merseybeat; pop rock
- Length: 29:08
- Labels: Parlophone (UK); Capitol T-6143 (Canada)
- Producer: Ron Richards

The Hollies chronology
Stay with the Hollies (1964)	In the Hollies Style (1964)	Hollies (1965)

the Hollies Canadian chronology
Stay with the Hollies (1964)	In the Hollies Style (1965)	I Can't Let Go / Look Through Any Window (1966)

Professional ratings
Review scores
Source	Rating
AllMusic	4.5/5 stars
Uncut	3/5 stars

In the Hollies Style is the second album by the English rock and pop band the Hollies, released in November 1964. It missed the official Record Retailer album chart in the United Kingdom, which at the time only had a total of 20 available spots. The album charted in the top 10 at No. 6 on New Musical Express magazine's competitive chart. In Canada, it was released on Capitol in October 1965, with an altered track listing.

As a result of poor sales of stereo copies of the band's debut album in the UK, In the Hollies Style was only available there in mono while stereo mixes were shipped to other markets. The stereo mix was finally released in the UK and retitled The Vintage Hollies in 1967. In 1997, British EMI put both mono and stereo versions of this album onto a single CD.

== Recording, production, and songs ==
Like the album's predecessor, Stay with the Hollies, In the Hollies Style was recorded at EMI Studios on Abbey Road in London, UK – which was later re-titled after the name of the street – and was produced by Ron Richards – who worked for other Abbey Road artists and later founded Associated Independent Recording with George Martin and John Burgess. Recording for the album commenced on 13 April 1964 when the band recorded the tracks "Time for Love" and "Don't You Know". Recording continued on 27 April where "You'll Be Mine", "It's in Her Kiss", "Come on Home", "Too Much Monkey Business" and "I Thought of You Last Night" were put to tape. Three more songs, the eventual B-side "Come on Back", "Set Me Free" and "Please Don't Feel Too Bad" were recorded on 30 June.

The group then did not enter the studio for almost two months, returning 16 August to record "What Kind of Boy" and to attempt the eventual single, "We're Through". Not satisfied with the arrangement from this session, they re-recorded "We're Through" on 25 August, at which time the final two songs recorded for the album, "To You My Love" and the opening medley "Nitty Gritty/Something's Got a Hold on Me", were also recorded.

A similarity between this album and its predecessor is the inclusion of many rhythm and blues songs by American writers and performers, such as Chuck Berry and Etta James. However, unlike its predecessor, In the Hollies Style also had multiple songs written by members of the band. In fact, 7 of the 12 songs on the album were written by Allan Clarke, Tony Hicks, and Graham Nash and were credited to the members under the pseudonym "L. Ransford". Clarke, Hicks, and Nash continued to use the pseudonym until the For Certain Because album at the end of 1966, when the group's compositions started to become hits.

== Track listing ==
All songs written by Allan Clarke, Tony Hicks and Graham Nash (credited to "L. Ransford"), except where noted.

Side one
No.	Title	Writer(s)	Lead vocals	Length
1.	"Nitty Gritty/Something's Got a Hold on Me"	Lincoln Chase/Etta James, Leroy Kirkland, Pearl Woods	Clarke	4:13
2.	"Don't You Know"		Clarke, with Hicks and Nash	1:57
3.	"To You My Love"		Nash	2:08
4.	"It's in Her Kiss"	Rudy Clark	Clarke, Nash and Hicks	2:15
5.	"Time for Love"		Clarke with Nash	2:31
6.	"What Kind of Boy"	Big Dee Irwin	Clarke	2:39

Side two
No.	Title	Writer(s)	Lead vocals	Length
7.	"Too Much Monkey Business"	Chuck Berry	Clarke, Nash and Hicks	2:28
8.	"I Thought of You Last Night"	Ralph Freed	Clarke and Nash	2:18
9.	"Please Don't Feel Too Bad"		Clarke	2:27
10.	"Come On Home"		Clarke and Nash	1:53
11.	"You'll Be Mine"		Clarke	2:02
12.	"Set Me Free"		Clarke with Nash	2:28

== Canadian version ==
Although the Hollies had become major stars in the UK, neither their US nor their Canadian labels chose to release this album. Finally, after the release of their third UK album, Hollies, Capitol Canada chose to release this album in an altered version on 4 October 1965 and not to release Hollies. The Canadian version only includes five of the songs on the UK version, while also making room for three of the band's UK non-album hits ("We're Through", "Yes I Will" and "I'm Alive"), two B-sides ("You Know He Did" and "Come on Back"), one song from Hollies ("Mickey's Monkey") and one other song from the I'm Alive EP ("Honey and Wine").

In total, the Canadian version included 6 songs written by Clarke-Hicks-Nash and credited to L. Ransford, only one less song than the UK version, and 10 different original songs were included on the two versions of the album.

=== Track listing ===
Side one

1. "I'm Alive" (Clint Ballard Jr.) – 2:24
2. "You Know He Did" (L. Ransford) – 2:01
3. "Honey and Wine" (Gerry Goffin, Carole King) – 2:28
4. "Mickey's Monkey" (Holland-Dozier-Holland) – 2:29
5. "Come on Back" (L. Ransford) – 2:10
6. "We're Through" (L. Ransford) – 2:15

Side two

1. "Yes I Will" (Goffin, Russ Titelman) – 2:57
2. "Don't You Know" – 1:57
3. "To You My Love" – 2:08
4. "Time for Love" – 2:31
5. "What Kind of Boy" – 2:39
6. "Too Much Monkey Business" – 2:28

== Personnel ==
The Hollies

- Allan Clarke – vocals
- Tony Hicks – lead guitar, vocals
- Graham Nash – rhythm guitar, vocals
- Eric Haydock – bass guitar
- Bobby Elliott – drums, percussion

Additional personnel

- Ron Richards – production

== Charts ==
Chart (1964)	Peak position
UK New Musical Express Top Ten LPs	6
