= Jennifer Eccles =

Single by the Hollies
- B-side: "Open Up Your Eyes" (UK); "Try It" (US)
- Released: 22 March 1968
- Recorded: 3 and 22 February 1968
- Studio: Chappell's and EMI, London
- Genre: Bubblegum pop
- Length: 2:40 (album): 3:04 (single)
- Label: Parlophone (UK); Epic (US)
- Songwriters: Graham Nash, Allan Clarke
- Producer: Ron Richards

The Hollies singles chronology
"Dear Eloise" (1967)	"Jennifer Eccles" (1968)	"Listen to Me" (1968)

"Jennifer Eccles" is a single by the Hollies. It was released in 1968 with the B-side "Open Up Your Eyes" on the Parlophone label, Catalogue number R5680. The track reached No.7 on the UK singles chart in March 1968. It was released in the US with a different B-side, "Try It", and reached No.40 on the Billboard Hot 100. The song was written by members of the band with input from their wives and the title is a combination of their names (Allan Clarke's wife Jennifer née Bowstead and Graham Nash's wife, from 1964 to 1966, Rose née Eccles). After the disappointing chart performance of the psychedelic-leaning "King Midas in Reverse", this song was a return to the popular style that had been commercially successful for the group.

Cash Box praised the song's "simplicity and straightforward happiness."

The name Jennifer Eccles also features in the song "Lily the Pink" by The Scaffold; the reference is an in-joke, as Graham Nash, who left the Hollies in December 1968, sang backing vocals on this recording.

== Charts ==
Chart (1968)	Peak position
Australia (Go-Set)	10
Austria (Austrian Singles Chart)	5
Canada (RPM Magazine)	19
West Germany (GfK)	8
Netherlands (Dutch Singles Chart)	17
New Zealand (Listener)	8
Norway (VG-Lista)	5
United Kingdom (UK Singles Chart)	7
Billboard Hot 100	40

== Other versions ==
- The independent rock artist E | released a cover on The Hollies tribute album Sing Hollies in Reverse, later rereleasing it on Eels single "Souljacker Part I" (CD 2) and on Useless Trinkets, a collection of Eels (and E) B-sides and rarities.
