= King Midas in Reverse =

1967 single by the Hollies

- US picture sleeve

Single by the Hollies
- B-side: "Everything Is Sunshine" (UK); "Water on the Brain" (US)
- Released: 22 September 1967
- Recorded: 3–4 August 1967
- Studio: EMI, London
- Genre: Psychedelia; psychedelic pop; orchestral pop
- Length: 3:07
- Label: Parlophone (UK); Epic (US)
- Songwriters: Graham Nash; Allan Clarke; Tony Hicks
- Producer: Ron Richards

The Hollies singles chronology
"Carrie Anne" (1967)	"King Midas in Reverse" (1967)	"Dear Eloise" (1967)

"King Midas in Reverse" is a song by English pop group the Hollies, written by Graham Nash but credited to Allan Clarke, Nash and Tony Hicks. It was released as a single in September 1967 in anticipation of the band's album Butterfly.

== Musical style ==
The track was a departure in style for the group and influenced by Graham Nash's visits to the United States. Nash wanted to take the band in a new direction, which was resisted by other members of the band, and this led to his departure and move to the US. The song was released in the UK on the Parlophone label (R5637) and in the US on the Epic label (10234). While a critical success, the song was a commercial failure by the Hollies' standards, prompting them to write and record the more commercial song "Jennifer Eccles" for their next single.

== Reception ==
Cash Box said that it's "a crashing folk-drenched rock side with heavy push in the rhythm section and some fine group vocal work" that also has "stunning production." Record World called it a "compelling rock ballad about a destructive young chap.."

== Charts ==
Chart performance for "King Midas in Reverse"
Chart (1967)	Peak position
Australia (Go-Set)	17
Netherlands (Dutch Singles Chart)	16
New Zealand (Listener)	14
UK Singles (OCC)	18
US Billboard Hot 100	51
West Germany (GfK)	31

== Cover versions ==
- Nash performed the song in his solo section of concerts with Crosby, Stills, Nash & Young, the band Nash joined after the Hollies, during their 1970 tours. It appears on the 1992 reissue of their album 4 Way Street.
- DCL Locomotive, a spinoff of the post-punk band The Cravats, released their version of the song as a 12" single in 1984.
- The Posies covered the song in 1995 for the tribute album Sing Hollies in Reverse.

== In film ==
The song features in The Limey, when Peter Fonda's character, an ageing record producer, is introduced.

== See also ==
- King Midas
