= Carrie Anne =

1967 song by the Hollies

- US Picture Sleeve

Single by the Hollies
- B-side: "Signs That Will Never Change"
- Released: 26 May 1967
- Recorded: 1 May 1967
- Studio: EMI, London
- Genre: Pop rock, soft rock
- Length: 2:55
- Label: Parlophone (UK); Epic (US)
- Songwriters: Allan Clarke, Graham Nash, Tony Hicks
- Producer: Ron Richards

The Hollies singles chronology
"On a Carousel" (1967)	"Carrie Anne" (1967)	"King Midas in Reverse" (1967)

"Carrie Anne" is a song written by Allan Clarke, Graham Nash, and Tony Hicks and released by British pop rock group the Hollies. It was recorded on 1 May 1967 and was released as a single in the same month by Parlophone Records in the United Kingdom and Epic Records in the United States. It became a hit in 1967, reaching No.3 on the UK Singles Chart. It was also a hit in the US and Canada, peaking at No.9 on both pop charts. It also reached No.4 in the Irish charts.

== Conception and recording ==
According to Allan Clarke the song was written during a concert the group did with Tom Jones; Graham Nash and Tony Hicks were the main writers, with Allan Clarke supplying the lyrics for the middle eight. The introduction features vocal harmonies strongly influenced by the Beach Boys. A steelpan solo is featured, probably the first use of the instrument on a pop record. The solo (mostly a harmonized restatement of the vocal melody) was probably played by Trinidadian Ralph Richardson, though others argue it may have been Mario Gibbins. The track was recorded in only two takes on 1 May 1967 at EMI's Abbey Road Studios. The first take was a false start and can be heard on the compilation The Hollies at Abbey Road: 1966 to 1970.

Cashbox called it "a gently driving, pulsating, soft-rock venture that is likely to stir up a lot of activity with the teens".

The song is a shy tribute to Marianne Faithfull.

"Carrie Anne" appeared on the soundtrack of Michael Apted's 1974 movie Stardust. It was also used in the HBO series The Sopranos, episode "Down Neck" (Season 1, Episode 7), during one of Tony's flashbacks.

== Charts ==
The story with Carrie Anne is that we wrote it – started it – as a song for Marianne Faithfull. We’d all seen her and we all wanted her. She was a deliciously sexy young Catholic schoolgirl with all of the baggage that comes along with that. We loved Marianne and she actually came on the road with the Hollies for a month or so... We tried to find a name that was kind of similar to Marianne and one that would not give the game away, shall we say.
–Graham Nash

Chart (1967)	Peak position
Australia (Go-Set)	7
Finland (Soumen Virallinen)	32
West Germany (GfK)	8
Ireland (IRMA)	4
Netherlands (Dutch Singles Chart)	4
New Zealand (Listener)	3
Norway (VG-Lista)	7
United Kingdom (UK Singles Chart)	3
United States Billboard Hot 100	9

== Other versions ==
- The Slovak-language rendering "Je môj sen" was recorded in 1968 by Tatjana Hubinská.
- American singer-songwriter Tommy Keene, on his 2004 rarities compilation, Drowning—A Tommy Keene Miscellany. It was also included on the 1995 Eggbert Records release Sing Hollies in Reverse
- Ali Campbell, on his 2010 album 'Great British Songs'. It was released as a UK single on 8 November 2010
- The B-side "Signs That Will Never Change" was recorded first by the Everly Brothers, released in 1966 on the Two Yanks in England album.
- Shania Twain performed this song as a cover in her Las Vegas show, Shania: Still the One, that ran from December 2012 to December 2014.
- Game Theory recorded a live version that was included on the 2016 reissue of their album Lolita Nation.
- Claude François, in November 1967 under the French title "L'Homme au traineau"

== In popular culture ==
Actress Carrie-Anne Moss reportedly was named (by her mother) in honour of the song, which was released three months before her birth.
