= Gregory Carroll (R&B singer) =

American singer-songwriter

John Wayne Carroll (December 19, 1929 – January 25, 2013), usually known as Gregory Carroll or Greg Carroll, was an American R&B singer, songwriter, and record producer. He was a member of several successful vocal harmony or "doo-wop" groups including The Four Buddies and The Orioles, and co-wrote and produced Doris Troy's 1963 hit "Just One Look".

== Life and career ==
He was born in Baltimore, Maryland, one of six children of Upsher and Sally Carroll. He formed a vocal group, The Metronomes, with three school friends from Frederick Douglass High School in Baltimore, Leon "Larry" Harrison, William Carter and Vernon Palmer. The group recorded, with Johnny Otis among others, for Savoy Records, and changed their name, first to the Four Buds and then the Four Buddies. Carroll was the second tenor voice in the group. In 1951, they had a no.2 national hit on the Billboard R&B chart with the song "I Will Wait".

He left the Four Buddies in 1953 and replaced George Nelson as second tenor in the Orioles, shortly before the group recorded their biggest hit, "Crying in the Chapel". The song reached no.1 on the R&B chart and no.11 on the pop chart. After the Orioles split up in 1955, Carroll developed an interest in music production, while also working as a background singer on sessions in New York City. He also reunited with Larry Harrison to form another vocal harmony group, The Dappers. They signed with RCA Records in early 1956, but the original group split up after their first recording and Carroll recruited a new group, who recorded for Rainbow Records and toured as The Dappers.

Carroll then formed a duo, Greg & Peg, with singer and guitarist Peggy Jones, who later performed as "Lady Bo" with Bo Diddley. He also produced a session with Sonny Til, of the Orioles. In 1960, he recorded an unsuccessful solo single for Epic Records, "Wa Ding Dung Doo" / "Stand By Me". In the early 1960s, he formed a new quartet, the Halos, with singers Al Showell, Doc Wheeler, and Doris Troy, and co-wrote the song "Just One Look" with Troy. He produced a demo record with Troy, which was rejected by Sue Records before being heard by Jerry Wexler of Atlantic, who released the version as originally recorded. The song became an international hit, with Doris Troy's version reaching no.10 in the US, and a cover version by The Hollies reaching no.2 on the UK Singles Chart in early 1964.

In later years, Carroll performed and toured with a reformed version of the Orioles, featuring Sonny Til, and between 1970 and 1987 with a non-original version of the Ink Spots led by Jim Nabbie. He retired in 1994, living in Ashe County, North Carolina, occasionally performing at concerts.

He died at the age of 83 in Creston, North Carolina. He was preceded in death by one son and left behind his partner, two sons, three daughters (one of whom is musician Tobi Parks) and eight grandchildren.
