= Just One Look (Doris Troy song) =

1963 single by Doris Troy

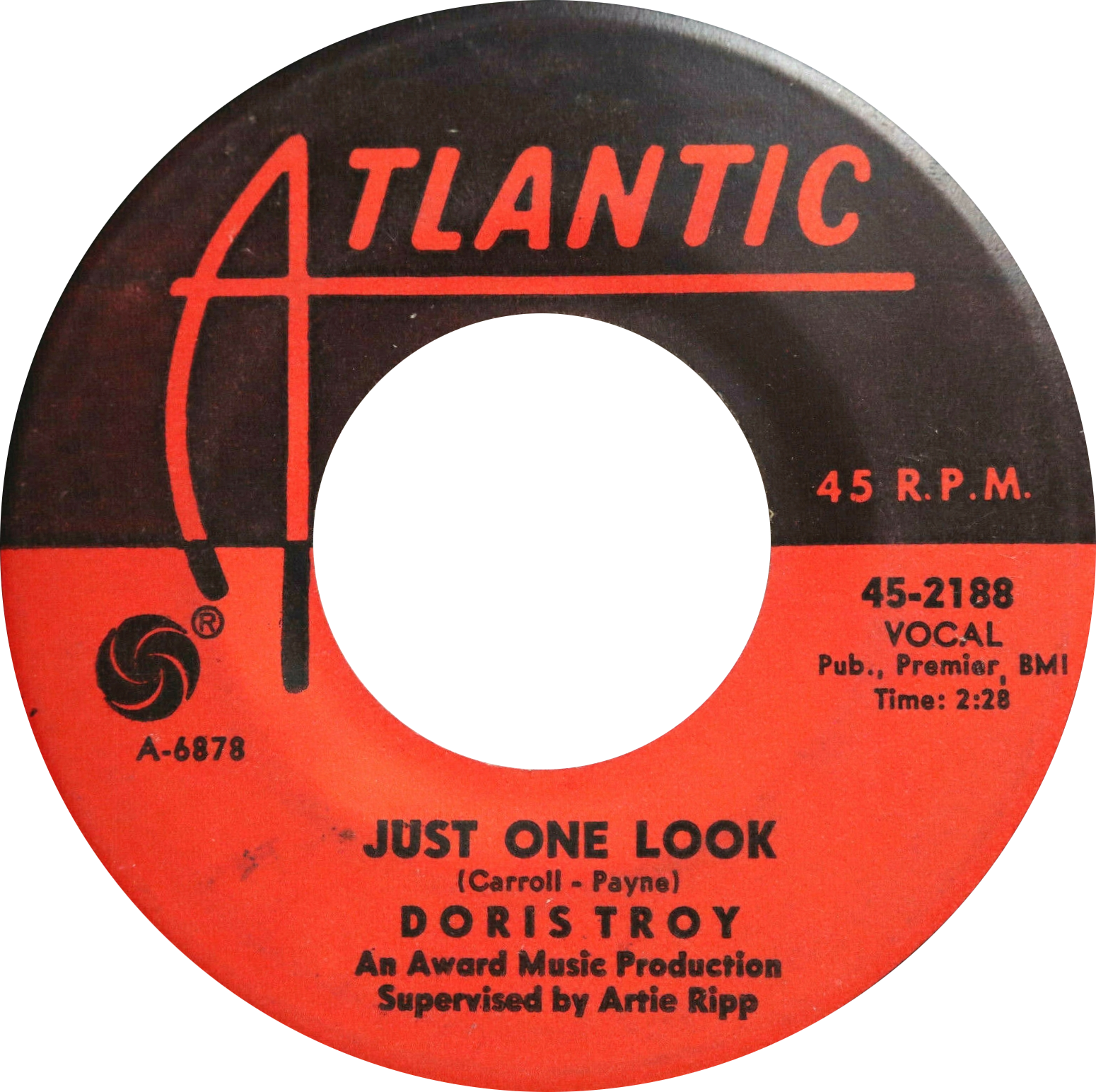
- Side A of US single

Single by Doris Troy

from the album Just One Look
- B-side: "Bossa Nova Blues"
- Released: May 1963
- Recorded: 1963
- Genre: R&B; pop
- Length: 2:25
- Label: Atlantic
- Songwriters: Gregory Carroll, Doris Payne
- Producer: Artie Ripp

Doris Troy singles chronology
"What a Wonderful Lover" (1960)	"Just One Look" (1963)	"What'cha Gonna Do About It" (1963)

"Just One Look" is a song co-written by American R&B singers Doris Troy and Gregory Carroll. The recording by Doris Troy was a hit in 1963. The Hollies, Anne Murray, Linda Ronstadt and Iain Matthews each achieved success with the song. There have also been many other versions.

== Doris Troy version ==
=== Background ===
Details vary as to how the Doris Troy version came to be released on Atlantic Records. According to the book Billboard Book of One-Hit Wonders, James Brown saw Troy performing in a nightclub (under her then-stage name Doris Payne), and introduced her to Atlantic. According to a more recent and detailed story in Soulful Divas, Payne recorded a studio demo of the song and took it to Sue Records first, but their lack of response led her to offer it to Jerry Wexler at Atlantic, where the label released the demo unchanged. The personnel included Ernie Hayes on piano, Wally Richardson on guitar, Bob Bushnell on bass and Bernard Purdie on drums.

The single's release was the first time she started using "Doris Troy" as her stage name, though her pen name remained Doris Payne. She is listed as Payne in the songwriting credits.

=== Reception ===
In 1963, Doris Troy scored her only hit on the U.S. Billboard Hot 100 chart with "Just One Look". The song spent 14 weeks on the Billboard Hot 100, peaking at No. 10, while reaching No. 3 on Billboard's Hot R&B Singles chart, No. 8 on New Zealand's "Lever Hit Parade", and No. 1 on Canada's CHUM Hit Parade for 3 weeks. It also charted at No. 9 on the Cash Box Top 100, in a tandem ranking with the version by Andy and the Marglows, with Troy's version marked as a bestseller.

"Just One Look" was ranked No. 70 on Billboard's end of year ranking "Top Records of 1963", while being ranked No. 80 on Cash Box's "Top 100 Chart Hits of 1963", and No. 11 on Billboard's "Top R&B Singles for 1963".

=== Chart performance ===
==== Weekly charts ====
Chart (1963)	Peak position
Canada (CHUM Hit Parade)	1
New Zealand (Lever Hit Parade)	8
U.S. Billboard Hot 100	10
U.S. Billboard Hot R&B Singles	3
U.S. Cash Box Top 100	9

==== Year-end charts ====
Chart (1963)	Rank
U.S. Cash Box	80
U.S. Billboard Hot 100	81

=== In television advertisements ===
Doris Troy's version was featured in a 1991 Pepsi commercial starring Cindy Crawford, which was re-aired during Super Bowl XXXV in 2001. An updated version of the ad, still featuring Cindy Crawford and Troy's rendition, aired in 2002. In 2015, Troy's take was featured in an ad for Aspartame Free Diet Pepsi. A different version was utilized in a series of commercials for Mazda, beginning in 1979 and continuing into the early 1980s.

== The Hollies version ==
"Just One Look"
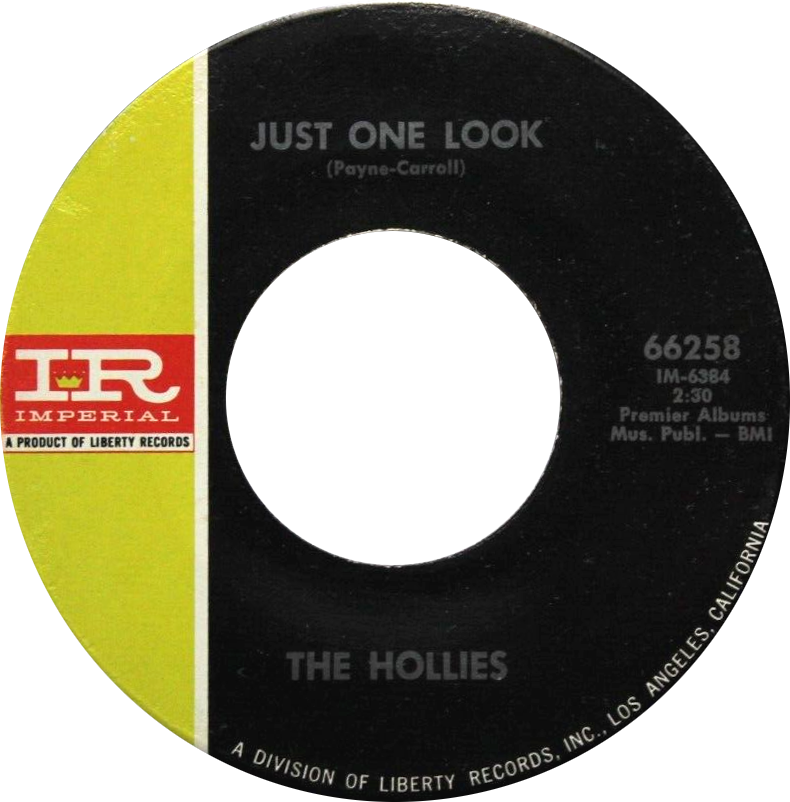
- Side A of the 1967 US single reissue

Single by the Hollies

from the album Here I Go Again
- B-side: "Keep Off That Friend of Mine"
- Released: February 1964
- Recorded: January 27, 1964
- Studio: EMI, London
- Genre: Rock
- Length: 2:30
- Label: Parlophone
- Songwriters: Gregory Carroll, Doris Payne

The Hollies singles chronology
"Stay" (1963)	"Just One Look" (1964)	"Here I Go Again" (1964)

Audio
- The Hollies – Just One Look on YouTube

=== Background ===
"Just One Look" became a hit in the United Kingdom via a cover by the Hollies which reached No. 2 on the Record Retailer chart in April 1964. It became the 37th biggest hit of the year. Although not a major U.S. hit in its original release, the Hollies' "Just One Look" marked the first appearance of the band on the Billboard Hot 100 at No. 98. A U.S. re-issue in 1967 reached No. 44 on the Billboard Hot 100.

=== Chart performance ===
==== Weekly charts ====
Chart (1964)	Peak position
Australia	29
Ireland (Evening Press)	6
New Zealand (Lever Hit Parade)	4
Norway (VG-lista)	11
Sweden	8
UK (Record Retailer)	2

Chart (1967)	Peak position
Canada (RPM 100)	30
United States (Billboard Hot 100)	44

== Linda Ronstadt version ==
"Just One Look"
- Side A of US single

Single by Linda Ronstadt

from the album Living in the USA
- B-side: "Love Me Tender"
- Released: January 23, 1979
- Recorded: 1978
- Genre: Rock
- Length: 3:20
- Label: Asylum
- Songwriters: Gregory Carroll, Doris Payne
- Producer: Peter Asher

Linda Ronstadt singles chronology
"Ooh Baby Baby" (1978)	"Just One Look" (1979)	"Alison" (1979)

Live video
- Linda Ronstadt – "Just One Look" from Live in Hollywood, 1980 on YouTube

=== Background ===
Linda Ronstadt included "Just One Look" on her 1978 album Living in the USA. Her cover was issued on Asylum Records as the album's third single on January 23, 1979, and was produced by Peter Asher. Ronstadt's single spent eight weeks on the Billboard Hot 100, reaching No. 44, while reaching No. 5 on Billboard's Easy Listening chart. It also peaked at No. 46 on the Cash Box Top 100 and No. 54 on the Record World Singles chart.

=== Chart performance ===
==== Weekly charts ====
Chart (1979)	Peak position
Australia (KMR)	38
Canada RPM 100 Singles	46
Canadian RPM Adult Contemporary	4
U.S. Billboard Hot 100	44
U.S. Billboard Easy Listening	5
U.S. Cash Box Top 100	46
U.S. Record World Singles	54

==== Year-end charts ====
Chart (1979)	Rank
U.S. Billboard Hot 100	256

== Other versions ==
Martha Reeves & the Vandellas covered the song later that year on their 1963 album Heat Wave. Anne Murray remade "Just One Look" for her 1974 Love Song album. The track was produced by Brian Ahern and issued as a single that October. Her cover reached No. 11 on Canada's RPM Top Singles chart, No. 12 on Canada's CHUM 30, and spent two weeks on the U.S. Billboard Hot 100, reaching No. 86. It also reached No. 50 on Billboard's Easy Listening chart. The single's B-side, "Son of a Rotten Gambler", reached No. 1 on RPM's Adult Contemporary chart and No. 3 on RPM's Country chart in 1974. The Tampa, Florida-based disco band Faith Hope and Charity released a cover, which spent four weeks on the UK Singles Chart, reaching No. 38 on February 7, 1976.

German opera singer, Klaus Nomi released a version on his second album Simple Man in 1982.

== See also ==
- One-hit wonders in the United States
- List of 1960s one-hit wonders in the United States
