= Stay with the Hollies =

- Members clockwise from left: Eric Haydock, Graham Nash, Allan Clarke, Tony Hicks, Bobby Elliott

Studio album by the Hollies
- Released: January 1964
- Recorded: 15 May – 11 December 1963
- Studios: EMI, London
- Genres: Rock; R&B
- Length: 33:42
- Label: Parlophone
- Producer: Ron Richards

The Hollies chronology
Stay with the Hollies (1964)	In the Hollies Style (1964)

Singles from Stay with the Hollies
- 1. "Stay" Released: 15 November 1963

US edition (Imperial Records)
- US edition, entitled Here I Go Again

Professional ratings
Review scores
Source	Rating
New Musical Express	3/10
Record Mirror	4/5 stars
Uncut	2/5 stars

Stay with the Hollies, also known by its American release title Here I Go Again, is the debut studio album by the English rock and pop band the Hollies, released in January 1964 on Parlophone Records. In Canada, it was released on Capitol in July 1964, with a different track listing. In the US, Imperial Records issued the album under the title Here I Go Again in June 1964 to capitalize on the moderate success of the singles "Here I Go Again" (No. 107) and "Just One Look" (No. 98). It also features covers of well-known R&B songs, not unusual for Beat groups of the day.

== Background ==
After the success of the Liverpool-based group the Beatles, many artists and repertoire men from London-based record labels went to Liverpool in search of other beat groups. When Ron Richards from Parlophone visited Liverpool in early 1963, the group playing that night at the Cavern Club was the Hollies, who were actually from Manchester. Richards promptly signed them to Parlophone, which was also the Beatles' label.

== Recording, production and songs ==
After the group was signed to Parlophone, the Hollies made their studio recordings at EMI Studios, located on Abbey Road in London – which later had its name changed to Abbey Road Studios. The group was produced by Ron Richards, who was the primary assistant to George Martin, produced other Abbey Road artists such as Gerry and the Pacemakers, and later started Associated Independent Recording with Martin and John Burgess. Because Parlophone already had the Beatles, Richards had the Hollies release a series of singles. However, by the end of 1963, despite the departure of original drummer Don Rathbone, the Hollies' single releases had been successful enough for Parlophone to release an album by the group.

From the beginning, the songs performed by the Hollies were known for the vocal harmony between Allan Clarke, Tony Hicks, and Graham Nash, which enabled them to bring a different sound to older tunes. In fact, most of the songs on the album were originally written and performed by Americans, including Chuck Berry, a favourite among beat groups. The only original composition on the British album was "Little Lover", written by Allan Clarke and Graham Nash. The American release also only had one original, the Bobby Elliott/Tony Hicks composition "Keep Off That Friend of Mine", while the Canadian release included both "Little Lover" and the Graham Nash composition "Hey What's Wrong with Me".

== Charts ==
The single "Stay" was released by Parlophone in November 1963 and eventually peaked at No. 8 on the UK singles chart. Stay with the Hollies followed three months later and peaked at No. 2 on the UK Albums Chart.

== Track listing ==
Side one
No.	Title	Writer(s)	Lead vocals	Length
1.	"Talking 'bout You"	Chuck Berry	Clarke, Hicks, Nash	2:09
2.	"Mr. Moonlight"	Roy Lee Johnson	Nash	2:05
3.	"You Better Move On"	Arthur Alexander	Clarke and Nash	2:46
4.	"Lucille"	Al Collins, Little Richard	Clarke and Nash	2:27
5.	"Baby Don't Cry"	Tony Hiller, Perry Ford	Clarke and Nash	2:06
6.	"Memphis"	Chuck Berry	Clarke and Nash	2:34
7.	"Stay"	Maurice Williams	All	2:13

Side two
No.	Title	Writer(s)	Lead vocals	Length
8.	"Rockin' Robin"	Jimmie Thomas	Clarke	2:17
9.	"Whatcha Gonna Do 'bout It?"	Gregory Carroll, Doris Payne	Clarke with Nash	2:20
10.	"Do You Love Me"	Berry Gordy	Clarke	2:10
11.	"It's Only Make Believe"	Conway Twitty, Jack Nance	Clarke and Nash	3:13
12.	"What Kind of Girl Are You"	Ray Charles	Clarke and Nash	3:03
13.	"Little Lover"	Graham Nash, Allan Clarke	Clarke	1:58
14.	"Candy Man"	Fred Neil, Beverly Ross	Clarke	2:28

== The US version (Here I Go Again) ==
In June 1964, Imperial Records acquired the US rights to the Hollies and released the first LP as Here I Go Again after the moderate success of that single and its immediate predecessor "Just One Look" in America. Imperial removed five UK LP tracks – "Baby Don't Cry", "Mr. Moonlight", "Little Lover", "Whatcha Gonna Do 'Bout It" and "Candy Man" – and added the singles "Just One Look" and "Here I Go Again" along with the Hicks/Elliott original "Keep Off That Friend of Mine" (B-side of "Just One Look", the first time this song appeared on an LP) to create the US release. In 2010, the mono version of this LP was reissued on 180-gram vinyl in the US by Sundazed Music.

In 1966, the 1963 recordings of "Candy Man", "Little Lover" (mistitled on some covers as "Little Love") and "Whatcha Gonna Do 'Bout It" were included on the new Imperial album "Bus Stop". The Hollies were not happy with Imperial's decision to release that collection, and it was one of the reasons cited by the group in their decision to leave Imperial in 1967 and sign with Epic Records for distribution of their music in the USA.

=== Technical ===
- Ron Richards – producer
- Gene Weed – liner notes

"Just One Look" charted again at number 44 in 1967 when it was re-released from The Hollies' Greatest Hits album.

=== US track listing (Here I Go Again) ===
Side one

1. "Here I Go Again" (Mort Shuman, Clive Westlake) – 2:19
2. "Stay" – 2:13
3. "Lucille" – 2:27
4. "Memphis" – 2:34
5. "You Better Move On" – 2:46
6. "Talkin' 'bout You" – 2:09

Side two

1. "Just One Look" (Gregory Carroll, Doris Payne) – 2:31
2. "Keep Off That Friend of Mine" (Bobby Elliott, Tony Hicks) – 2:10
3. "Rockin' Robin" – 2:17
4. "Do You Love Me" – 2:10
5. "What Kind of Girl Are You" – 3:03
6. "It's Only Make Believe" – 3:13

== The Canadian album ==
Stay with the Hollies was also the title of the Hollies' first Canadian LP, released on 20 July 1964 as Capitol T-6073. The LP was released on the Capitol 6000 label, a label available only in Canada that released mainly recordings of British artists that were signed to an EMI-owned label in the UK

The Canadian album, which was compiled and supervised by Paul White for release in Canada, is very different from both the original UK release and its US counterpart, Here I Go Again. Like the US album, it includes the non-LP singles "Just One Look" and "Here I Go Again"; in addition, it contains the Hollies' first two UK hit singles, "(Ain't That) Just Like Me" and "Searchin'", plus one non-album B-side, "Hey What's Wrong with Me". To add these five songs, it omits the tracks "Baby Don't Cry", "Rockin' Robin", "It's Only Make Believe", "Whatcha Gonna Do 'Bout It" and "Candy Man" from the UK edition.

=== Canadian track listing ===
Side 1

1. "(Ain't That) Just Like Me" (Earl Carroll, Billy Guy) – 2:09
2. "Hey What's Wrong with Me" (Graham Nash) – 1:52
3. "I'm Talking About You"
4. "Mr. Moonlight"
5. "You Better Move On"
6. "Lucille"
7. "Stay"

Side 2

1. "Here I Go Again"
2. "Memphis"
3. "Searchin'" (Jerry Leiber, Mike Stoller) – 2:26
4. "Do You Love Me"
5. "What Kind of Girl Are You"
6. "Little Lover"
7. "Just One Look"

== Personnel ==
The Hollies

- Allan Clarke – vocals, harmonica
- Eric Haydock – bass guitar
- Tony Hicks – vocals, lead guitar
- Graham Nash – vocals, rhythm guitar
- Bobby Elliott – drums, except as noted
- Don Rathbone – drums on "Little Lover", "(Ain't That) Just Like Me" and "Searchin'"

Additional personnel

- Ron Richards – production
- Tommy Sanderson – piano on "Searchin'"

== Charts ==
Weekly chart performance for Stay with the Hollies
Chart (1964)	Peak position
UK Melody Maker Top Ten LPs	4
UK New Musical Express Top Ten LPs	2
UK Record Retailer LPs Chart	2
