= Abracadabra: The Asylum Years =

Compilation album by Judee Sill
- Released: June 19, 2006
- Recorded: 1971–1972
- Venue: Boston Music Hall, Boston, Massachusetts, United States (live tracks)
- Studio: Crystal-Sound Recording Studio, Hollywood, California, United States (Heart Food demos)
- Genre: Christian music, folk
- Length: 155:25
- Language: English
- Label: Asylum/Rhino Records
- Producer: John Beck; Henry Lewy; Graham Nash; Jim Pons; Judee Sill; Andy Zax

Judee Sill chronology
Dreams Come True (2005)	Abracadabra: The Asylum Years (2006)	Live in London: The BBC Recordings 1972–1973 (2007)

Abracadabra: The Asylum Years is a 2006 compilation album by American folk musician Judee Sill.

== Reception ==
Dave Simpson of The Guardian scored this compilation five out of five stars, writing that the music was "created on the cusp of inner torment and her quest for redemption". A review in Mojo rated it four out of five stars, calling it the "conclusive" collection of her studio recordings.

== Track listing ==
All tracks arranged and composed by Judee Sill, except where noted

Disc One: Judee Sill

1. "Crayon Angels" – 2:43 (Judee Sill)
2. "The Phantom Cowboy" – 1:44 (Judee Sill)
3. "The Archetypal Man" – 3:36 (Judee Sill)
4. "The Lamb Ran Away with the Crown" – 3:13 (Judee Sill)
5. "Lady-O" – 3:14 (Judee Sill)
6. "Jesus Was a Crossmaker" – 3:30 (Judee Sill)
7. "Ridge Rider" – 4:49 (Judee Sill)
8. "My Man on Love" – 3:29 (Judee Sill)
9. "Lopin' Along Thru the Cosmos" – 3:07 (Judee Sill)
10. "Enchanted Sky Machines" – 2:52 (Judee Sill)
11. "Abracadabra" – 1:59 (Judee Sill)
12. "The Pearl" (original version) – 1:49 (Judee Sill outtake, re-recorded for Heart Food)
13. "The Phoenix" (original version) – 2:24 (Judee Sill outtake, re-recorded for Heart Food)
14. "Ridge Rider" (alternate version) – 5:06 (Judee Sill outtake)
15. "My Man on Love" (alternate version) – 3:31 (Judee Sill outtake)
16. Intro / "The Vigilante" (live) – 4:37 (Live at Boston Music Hall, October 3, 1971)
17. "Lady-O" (live) – 3:25 (Live at Boston Music Hall, October 3, 1971)
18. "Enchanted Sky Machines" (live) – 6:49 (Live at Boston Music Hall, October 3, 1971)
19. "The Archetypal Man" (live) – 4:02 (Live at Boston Music Hall, October 3, 1971)
20. "Crayon Angels" (live) – 3:12 (Live at Boston Music Hall, October 3, 1971)
21. "The Lamb Ran Away with the Crown" (live) – 4:31 (Live at Boston Music Hall, October 3, 1971)
22. "Jesus Was a Cross Maker" (live) – 3:47 (Live at Boston Music Hall, October 3, 1971)

Disc Two: Heart Food

1. "There's a Rugged Road" – 3:45 (Heart Food)
2. "The Kiss" – 4:36 (Heart Food)
3. "The Pearl" – 1:55 (Heart Food)
4. "Down Where the Valleys Are Low" – 3:52 (Heart Food)
5. "The Vigilante" – 3:51 (Heart Food)
6. "Soldier of the Heart" – 3:34 (Heart Food)
7. "The Phoenix" – 2:37 (Heart Food)
8. "When the Bridegroom Comes" (lyrics: David Omer Bearden, music: Sill) – 4:15 (Heart Food)
9. "The Donor" – 7:54 (Heart Food)
10. [untitled] – 1:03 (Heart Food)
11. "The Desperado" – 3:57 (Heart Food outtake)
12. "The Kiss" (demo) – 4:13 (Heart Food solo demo)
13. "Down Where the Valleys Are Low" (demo) – 4:49 (Heart Food solo demo)
14. "The Donor" (demo) – 4:44 (Heart Food solo demo)
15. "Soldier of the Heart" (demo) – 3:06 (Heart Food solo demo)
16. "The Phoenix" (demo) – 2:29 (Heart Food solo demo)
17. "The Vigilante" (demo) – 3:44 (Heart Food solo demo)
18. "The Pearl" (demo) – 1:58 (Heart Food solo demo)
19. "There's a Rugged Road" (demo) – 3:43 (Heart Food solo demo)
20. "The Donor" (alternate mix) – 7:51 (previously unissued new mix)

== Personnel ==
Judee Sill

- Judee Sill – guitar, piano, vocals, arrangement
- Don Bagley – orchestration
- John Beck – production
- Gary Burden – art direction, design
- Rita Coolidge – backing vocals
- Larry Cox – engineering on "Jesus Was a Cross Maker"
- David Crosby – guitar
- Venetta Fields – backing vocals
- Bob Harris – orchestration
- Clydie King – backing vocals
- Henry Lewy – production
- Graham Nash – organ on "Jesus Was a Cross Maker", production on "Jesus Was a Cross Maker"
- Jim Pons – production

Heart Food

- Judee Sill – guitar, keyboards, vocals, arrangement
- Lynn Blessing – vibraphone
- Gene Cipriano – saxophone
- Vincent DeRosa – French horn
- Doug Dillard – banjo
- Oma Drake – vocals
- Assa Drori – violin
- Jesse Ehrlich – cello
- Buddy Emmons – pedal steel guitar
- Chris Ethridge – bass
- Ronald Folsom – violin
- Harris Goldman – violin
- Jim Gordon – drums
- Bobbye Hall – percussion
- Gloria Jones – vocals
- Ray Kelley – cello
- William Kurasch – violin
- Henry Lewy – production, audio engineering
- Leonard Malarsky – violin
- Spooner Oldham – keyboards
- Richard Perissi – French horn
- Bill Plummer – bass
- Emil Richards – percussion
- Ralph Schaeffer – violin
- David Schwartz – viola
- Louie Shelton – guitar
- Carolyn Willis – vocals
- Tibor Zelig – violin

Abracadabra: The Asylum Years

- Greg Allen – art direction, design
- Stuart Batsford – supervision
- Ken Bright – photography
- Henry Diltz – cover photography, photography
- Bill Halverson – engineering
- Dan Hersch – remastering
- Mick Houghton – supervision
- Anthony Hudson – art direction, design
- Brian Kehew – mixing at O.F.R., North Hollywood, California, United States (2003)
- Michele Kort – liner notes
- Eddie Lynn – assistant engineering
- Bob Maile – typography
- Michael Ochs Archives – photography
- Dave Schultz – remastering
- Andy Zax – compilation production, liner notes

== See also ==
- List of 2006 albums
