= Best of Bish =

Compilation album by Stephen Bishop
- Released: 1988
- Genre: Pop
- Length: 58:40
- Label: Rhino
- Producer: Stephen Bishop, Gus Dudgeon, Dave Grusin, Henry Lewy, Tommy LiPuma, Mike Mainieri, Greg Mathieson, Russ Titelman

Stephen Bishop chronology
Sleeping with Girls (1985)	Best of Bish (1988)	Bowling in Paris (1989)

Professional ratings
Review scores
Source	Rating
AllMusic	4.5/5 stars
Encyclopedia of Popular Music	3/5 stars

Best of Bish is the first compilation album by singer/songwriter Stephen Bishop. It was released by Rhino Records in 1988.

== History ==
Best of Bish collects nine tracks from Bishop's first three studio albums, including hits "On and On" and "Save It for a Rainy Day", with six tracks from motion pictures and other sources, some previously unavailable.

Hit "It Might Be You", from the 1982 film Tootsie, peaked at No. 25 on the Billboard singles chart, Bishop's first appearance there in four years. "If Love Takes You Away" is from the 1982 film Summer Lovers, whose soundtrack only appeared on LP, and "Unfaithfully Yours" came from the 1984 film of the same name, whose soundtrack was never released.

"Fallin'", "Someone's In Love" and "Separate Lives", a hit for Phil Collins and Marilyn Martin from the 1985 film White Nights, were recorded for the album Sleeping with Girls, a Stephen Bishop album which was never released in the United States.

Both "It Might Be You" and "Separate Lives" were nominated for Academy Awards for Best Original Song.

== Track listing ==
All songs written by Stephen Bishop, except where noted.

No.	Title	Writer(s)	Length
1.	"On and On"		3:08
2.	"Unfaithfully Yours (One Love)"		3:35
3.	"Looking for the Right One"		3:49
4.	"Save It for a Rainy Day"		3:18
5.	"Madge"		4:05
6.	"One More Night"		3:47
7.	"Fallin'"		4:08
8.	"Only the Heart Within You"		4:12
9.	"The Big House"		3:45
10.	"It Might Be You"	Dave Grusin, Alan and Marilyn Bergman	4:18
11.	"If Love Takes You Away"		3:37
12.	"Send a Little Love My Way (Like Always)" (remix with additional strings)		3:31
13.	"Someone's in Love"		4:32
14.	"Red Cab to Manhattan"		4:40
15.	"Separate Lives"		4:15
