= Tatiana DeMaria =

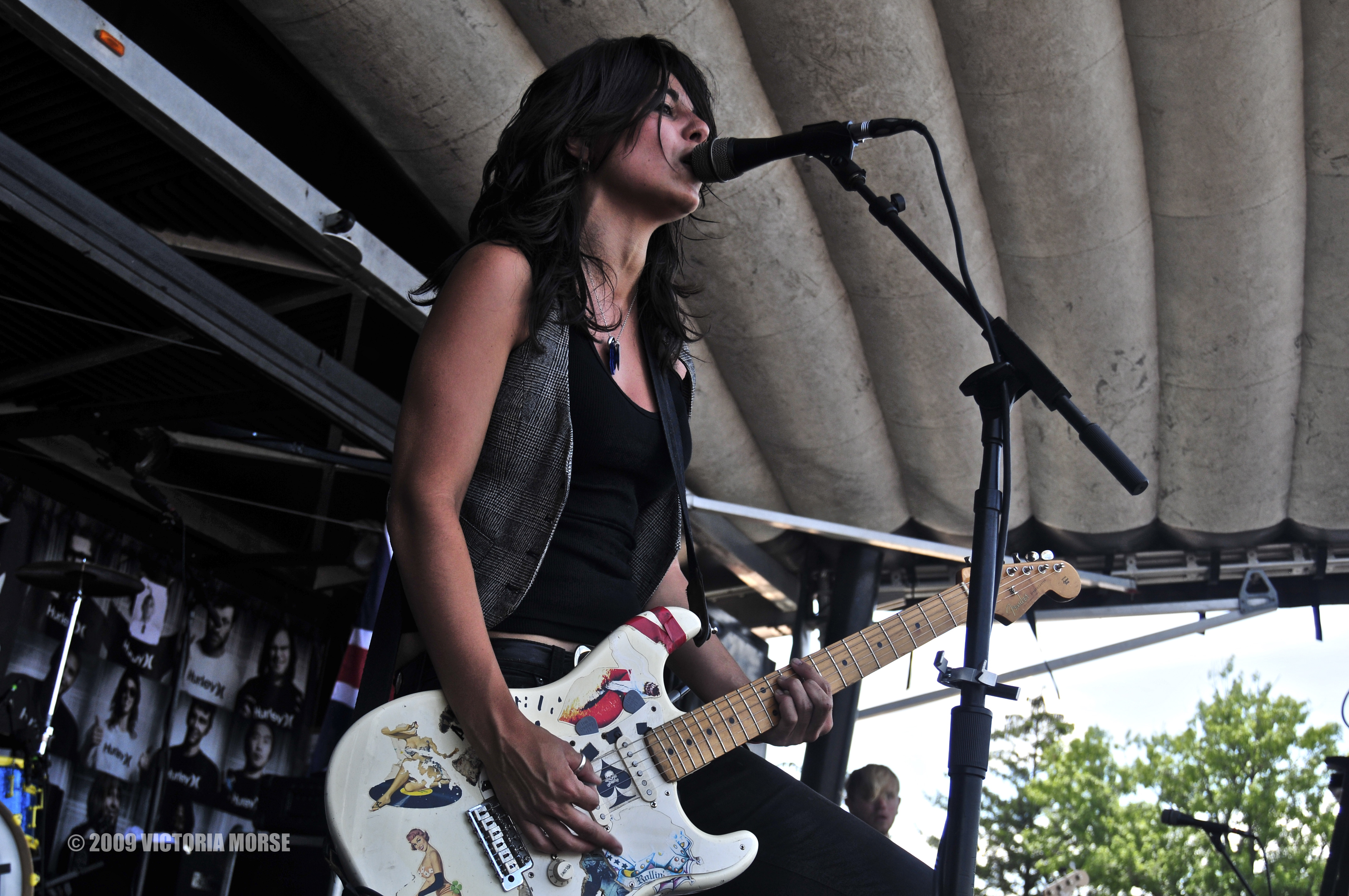
- TAT Warped Tour

Background information
- Origin: London, England
- Genres: ALT, Rock, Pop, Alternative Hip Hop, Punk
- Occupations: Singer, songwriter, record producer, multi-instrumentalist, entrepreneur, Web3 entrepreneur
- Instruments: Vocals, guitar, piano, bass
- Member of: TAT
- Website: Official website

Tatiana DeMaria is a British songwriter, singer, multi-instrumentalist, record producer, entrepreneur, and co-founder of the music technology company Supafanatix (SUPA). She is best known as the founder and frontwoman of the English rock/punk band TAT, with whom she performed more than 1,000 live shows internationally and released two UK-charting singles as a teenager. Alongside her music career, DeMaria has worked in blockchain, Web3, artificial intelligence, and emerging technologies, developing technology platforms and business models focused on digital ownership, data, and the future of the music industry. She has spoken internationally on topics including blockchain, artificial intelligence, digital ownership, technology, and industry disruption.

In 2018, DeMaria began releasing music under her full name, marking a shift from the punk-rock sound of TAT toward a broader blend of alternative pop, rock, hip hop, and R&B influences.As a solo artist, she has released multiple charting singles and is currently completing her debut solo album. In addition to her work as a recording artist, DeMaria has written and produced music for film, television, and advertising, including projects such as American Pie Presents: Girls' Rules, Blue Crush 2, Pretty Little Liars, and campaigns for brands including Pepsi and 7UP.

Beyond music, DeMaria has worked across blockchain, Web3, artificial intelligence, and emerging technologies. She partnered with Nacci and FutureOf on technology platforms leveraging AI, algorithms, and data, and in 2021 co-founded Supafanatix (SUPA), a company focused on applying predictive intelligence and data-driven insights to the music industry. She has also advised organizations on emerging technologies and has become a public voice on innovation, technology adoption, and the intersection of technology and creative industries.

== Early life ==
British-Lebanese, Tatiana DeMaria was born in London and moved to Paris in early childhood with her parents, returning to London in her early teens.

As a child, DeMaria was an avid listener of acts that would become early influences in her musical career: NOFX, Rancid, The Clash, 2Pac, and Green Day, among others. When she returned to London, she began playing guitar, songwriting, and performing in several high school bands.

== Musical career ==
=== TAT ===
In 2003, DeMaria formed rock/punk band TAT (originally named "The Camden Whigs") with her friend Tim Vanderkuil. After several bandmate changes, Nick Kent and Jake Reed joined, solidifying the band’s lineup. Over the next 10 years, TAT would tour extensively across the United States and Europe, playing multiple full runs of the Vans Warped Tour and headlining and touring alongside NOFX, The Offspring, Alice Cooper, and Joan Jett, among others.

In 2004, TAT released their debut single 'Peace Sex & Tea' which charted on the UK's top 50, followed by their 'Pessimist' EP, which entered the BBC's Official Rock Chart at number 18. Both singles/EPs were released independently through EX Records in conjunction with the Extreme Sports Channel. Two years later, TAT self-released and self-distributed their next single "Champagne Cocaine & Strawberries," and performed at the Vans Warped Tour. In 2007, TAT toured the UK and Europe with notable punk acts such as NOFX and The Bouncing Souls, Me First And The Gimme Gimmes, The Draft, and The Loved Ones. In 2008, TAT released their album preview EP entitled This Is...TAT, performed at the Vans Warped Tour, and embarked on several other North American/Canadian tours with Alice Cooper.

Soho Lights, TAT’s debut album, was released in 2008 through the band’s own label Red Wagon Records, with nationwide distribution across the US via Sony's RED Distribution.

In 2009, DeMaria lent her vocals to Reel Big Fish's album of covers, Fame, Fortune, and Fornication. In 2011, TAT was featured on the soundtrack of Blue Crush 2, with songs written and produced by DeMaria. At the end of the year, the band self-released the EP Somewhere Between Heaven and Hell.

=== Solo ===
DeMaria debuted her solo material on the Vans Warped Tour 2018, the Vans 25th Anniversary Celebration, followed by her first solo headline show to a sold-out crowd at the Whisky a Go Go in Los Angeles. The concert was filmed by the team from Marvel’s Agents of S.H.I.E.L.D., and will be released as a full-length concert film. DeMaria also appeared in her own comic book, created by Marvel artists and writers, which subsequently led to appearances at Comic-Con San Diego in 2019.

Between 2018 and 2020, DeMaria released her indie singles "Without You," "Make Me Feel," "London Don't Lie," and "What It Is About You" to critical acclaim. DeMaria is working on her debut solo EP & album, collaborating with Grammy award-winning hip-hop producer Che Pope (known for his work with Kanye West, 50 Cent, and Lauryn Hill). In 2021, DeMaria released her five-track collection, Acoustic Sessions: One, made up of four previously released studio songs and one unreleased track, recorded live at Tower of Power Studios in London.

DeMaria continues to write with and for EDM, rock, and hip-hop artists. Her commercial successes include writing, producing, and performing the global 7UP theme song and advertisements for Pepsi. She has written and produced eight songs for American Pie Presents: Girls’ Rule, a film in which she also appears on camera as herself.

== Artistry ==
DeMaria has cited The Clash, 2Pac, Timbaland, and Nina Simone as major influences on her career and artistry. She is a multi-instrumentalist, with the ability to play the piano and guitar. In interviews, DeMaria is often reluctant to strictly classify her music, which has been described as an intricate blend of influences from alternative rock, R&B, and hip-hop.

In a conversation with Gary Graff of Billboard, DeMaria said, "I just make a lot of music. When I was making the TAT record as a teenager I was also producing underground U.K. hip-hop, just making beats and sound production. I’m always writing and creating, so I have this body of work that’s different from (TAT) but still something I love."

DeMaria states that her artistry is influenced by her synesthesia, described as "a perceptual phenomenon in which senses that aren’t normally connected merge." In an interview for Audiofemme, DeMaria explained that different frequencies, sounds, and productions elicit physical sensations and colors for her, which then guide her through the creative process. "The parts and frequencies also have colors," she stated. "So when it comes to the mixing process I may want a track to be dark blue—if it’s sounding too yellow to me, I’ll pull down some frequencies to get that blue, warm, squishy feeling."

DeMaria’s multifaceted voice has been described as "melodic" and "sweet like honey," but also "raspy and robust." DeMaria has been praised for her relatable and powerful songwriting, and ability to create a compelling visual narrative for her music.

== Entrepreneurship and Technology ==
DeMaria has operated independently throughout much of her music career. Rather than signing with a major record label, she retained ownership of her master recordings and creative control over her releases. She founded the independent label Red Wagon Records and released music through her own company.

Alongside her work as a musician, songwriter, and producer, DeMaria became involved in blockchain technology and digital assets during the 2010s. She has cited her interest in ownership, value exchange, and emerging business models as factors in her exploration of the sector.

DeMaria later advised companies and public figures on blockchain-related projects and emerging technologies, including STBL, a company focused on the application of blockchain technology to physical assets and commodities.

In 2021, DeMaria minted and sold a guitar-solo NFT, which she described as the first guitar solo to be minted and sold as an NFT.

The same year, DeMaria worked with Nacci and FutureOf on projects involving blockchain, artificial intelligence, algorithms, and data applications for musicians and fans.

Later in 2021, she co-founded Supafanatix (SUPA), a music technology company focused on artificial intelligence, predictive analytics, and music-industry data.

DeMaria has appeared as a speaker at conferences and industry events focused on blockchain, Web3, artificial intelligence, and emerging technologies. Her speaking appearances have included Women of Web3 during Art Basel Miami, DCentral Austin, NFT Miami, and the Unfinished.

Through her @tdmcrypto social media channels, DeMaria publishes educational content related to blockchain, cryptocurrency, NFTs, Web3 technologies, decentralized autonomous organizations (DAOs), and emerging technology trends. Her social media accounts collectively reach hundreds of thousands of followers across platforms.

== Personal life ==
In 2020, DeMaria’s family home in Lebanon, and the homes of her relatives and close friends, were seriously damaged during the Beirut explosion. In response to the tragedy, DeMaria released "Beirut Fire" and donated 100% of the proceeds to disaster relief.

In an interview with Alternative Press, DeMaria divulged that she suffered from severe anxiety through her teenage years, and had written "Anxiety" in the midst of an anxiety attack. "I wanted to capture that feeling that is all so familiar to people with severe anxiety," she explained. "The inner bargaining we go through to try and get it to stop, the extremities we take our minds and bodies to. And how we can fundamentally believe the most irrational thoughts in that moment and feel like our lives are staked on them."

DeMaria now splits her time between London, Los Angeles, and New York City.
