= Thimk =

THIMK

Studio album by Stephen Bishop
- Released: August 15, 2025
- Recorded: Man Cave Studios, Los Angeles, California: Sorgente Studio, Tuscany, Italy
- Genres: Pop, yacht rock
- Length: 46:32
- Label: Life's a Bish Records
- Producer: Marcus Eaton

Stephen Bishop chronology
| Rock Little Reindeer (2019) | THIMK (2025) |

THIMK (stylized in all-capital letters) is the twentieth and final album by singer/songwriter Stephen Bishop.

Notable contributors to THIMK include Eric Clapton, Sting, Art Garfunkel, Michael McDonald, Kenny Loggins, Graham Nash, Jimmy Webb, Marilyn Martin, David Benoit, Steve Porcaro, Gerry Beckley, Dewey Bunnell and Christopher Cross.

The album is produced by Marcus Eaton.

== Track listing ==
All songs written by Stephen Bishop, except where noted.

| No. | Title | Writer(s) | Length |
|---|---|---|---|
| 1. | "Now That I've Hit the Big Time" | | 3:53 |
| 2. | "Only the Heart Within You" | | 4:22 |
| 3. | "She'll Always Be My Girl" | | 2:42 |
| 4. | "In the Limelight - Alternate Version" | | 3:25 |
| 5. | "The Money Girl" | | 4:09 |
| 6. | "Liz (So in Love with You)" | | 4:32 |
| 7. | "Really Wanting You" | | 2:32 |
| 8. | "One More Night" | | 3:59 |
| 9. | "You Don't Need My Love" | | 3:46 |
| 10. | "It Might Be You" | Bishop, Dave Grusin, Alan and Marilyn Bergman | 5:01 |
| 11. | "Under the Rainbow" | | 3:28 |
| 12. | "A Message from Stephen" | | 4:43 |

Bonus tracks CD and vinyl releases
| No. | Title | Length |
|---|---|---|
| 13. | "Dance off the Moon" |
| 14. | "You Can Laugh at Me" |

== Personnel ==
=== Musicians ===
- Stephen Bishop – lead vocals, guitar, backing vocals
- Marcus Eaton – guitar, bass, backing vocals, string arrangements, sampling
- Eric Clapton – slide guitar
- Christopher Cross – guitar
- Greg Leisz – pedal steel guitar
- Nathan East – bass
- Leland Sklar – bass
- Sean Hurley – bass
- Mai Leisz – bass
- Greg Phillinganes – keyboards
- Steve Porcaro – piano
- Jimmy Webb – piano
- John Jarvis – piano
- David Benoit – piano
- Michael McDonald – piano, backing vocals
- Nic Collins – drums
- Jake Reed – drums
- Steve Gadd – drums
- Jack Tempchin – harmonica
- Graham Nash – vocals
- Sting – backing vocals
- Art Garfunkel – backing vocals
- Kenny Loggins – backing vocals
- David Pack – backing vocals
- James Lee Stanley – backing vocals
- Gerry Beckley – backing vocals
- Dewey Bunnell – backing vocals
- Marilyn Martin – backing vocals
- Liz Lieber – backing vocals

=== Production ===
- Marcus Eaton – producer, engineer, and editor
- Liz Kamlet – executive producer
- Billy Centenaro – mixing
- Bernie Grundman - mastering
