= If I Could Only Remember My Name =

Studio album by David Crosby
- Released: February 22, 1971
- Studios: Wally Heider, San Francisco; A&M, Hollywood
- Genres: Psychedelic folk; freak folk; folk rock
- Length: 37:04
- Label: Atlantic
- Producer: David Crosby

David Crosby chronology
If I Could Only Remember My Name (1971)	Oh Yes I Can (1989)

Singles from If I Could Only Remember My Name
- 1. "Music Is Love" Released: March 1971; 2. "Orleans" Released: May 1971

If I Could Only Remember My Name is the debut solo album by the American singer-songwriter David Crosby, released on February 22, 1971, by Atlantic Records. It was one of four high-profile albums released by each member of Crosby, Stills, Nash & Young in the wake of their chart-topping 1970 album Déjà Vu. Guests on the album include Jerry Garcia, Graham Nash, Neil Young, Joni Mitchell, and other prominent West Coast musicians of the era.

The album peaked at No. 12 on the Billboard Top LPs chart and earned a RIAA gold record certification in the United States. It initially received negative reviews from critics, but has gone on to achieve cult fandom and praise from modern critics.

== Background ==
The album was released following the success of the 1970 Crosby, Stills, Nash, & Young album Déjà Vu. Its popularity contributed to the success of the four albums released by each of the members in its wake – Neil Young's After the Gold Rush (1970), Stephen Stills's self-titled solo debut (1970), this 1971 Crosby debut, and Graham Nash's Songs for Beginners (1971). The period was also one of mourning for Crosby following the death of his girlfriend Christine Hinton in a 1969 car accident. Grief stricken, Crosby coped by doing hard drugs and spending large amounts of time in the studio, where he "felt safe."

Recording sessions took place at the recently opened Wally Heider Studios in San Francisco. While there, Crosby invited many of his musician friends to take part. Among them were Nash, Young, Joni Mitchell, and members of the Grateful Dead (most frequently Jerry Garcia), Jefferson Airplane, Quicksilver Messenger Service, and Santana. According to Crosby,

These were all good friends and good people and they knew that I was lonely and they knew also that I was slightly nuts at the time, and they would come and we would play music ... I would sit down with whoever did show up – most often Jerry [Garcia] – and start playing a song ... If you started playing music, he wanted to play. And we had two-track tape running constantly the entire night. And the minute that something started to happen, the 24-track would start to roll – or maybe it was 12 track back then ... And then I would start layering harmonies onto it, and that was a lot of fun."

The loose ensemble of musicians was given the informal moniker of The Planet Earth Rock and Roll Orchestra by Jefferson Airplane bandleader, longtime Crosby associate and fellow science fiction fan Paul Kantner, although Crosby noted that the P.E.R.R.O. was only a willful invention of Kantner's rather than a collective project. Many from this agglomeration, including recording engineer Stephen Barncard, also worked on Kantner's Blows Against the Empire, Songs for Beginners by Nash, and the Grateful Dead's American Beauty, all recorded in part concurrently with the Crosby album at Wally Heider Studios.

== Music ==
Even with the star-studded guest line-up, the final two songs feature Crosby alone. Only five songs have actual lyrics, "Orleans" being a 15th Century round listing various French cathedrals. Crosby's song "Laughing" had been written earlier in his time with CSNY, while a demo version of "Song with No Words" had been tried out during the sessions for Déjà Vu and would appear on the 1991 CSN retrospective package. "Cowboy Movie" recounted the tale of a group of Old West outlaws torn apart by a femme fatale; in actuality a recounting in thinly veiled form of the encounter by the quartet with Rita Coolidge and her effect on the romantic aspirations of at least two of them, as identified immediately by Nash.

The album is rooted in the folk-rock tradition, but like much of Crosby's work it also borrows tunings, time signatures, and vocal phrasings from jazz. Some writers have labeled it an early example of psychedelic folk, with Billboard describing the music as "psychedelic folk dirges." Pitchfork stated that "[t]he music feels the way a dream sounds when you try to retell it in the morning: foggy, only loosely coherent, dissolving in real time."

== Release ==
If I Could Only Remember My Name was released in February 1971 on Atlantic Records. Two singles were taken from the album, including the minor hit "Music Is Love", a collaboration with Nash and Young that was released in April 1971 and peaked at No. 95 on the Billboard Hot 100. The album has remained continuously in print.

In October 1990, a compact disc version was released, having been digitally remastered from the original master tapes, using the equipment and techniques of the day, by Barncard. A double-compact disc version appeared in November 2006, with an audio disc remastered in HDCD, including a bonus track (the hitherto unreleased "Kids and Dogs", previously earmarked for an unreleased Crosby solo album slated to appear on Capitol Records in the early 1980s) and a second DVD Audio disc of the original album remixed for 5.1 digital Surround Sound.

On October 15, 2021, a 50th anniversary re-issue of the album was released with numerous out-takes and demos, as well as liner notes by Steve Silberman.

== Critical reception and legacy ==
Professional ratings
Review scores
Source	Rating
AllMusic	4.5/5 stars
The Encyclopedia of Popular Music	5/5 stars
Pitchfork	8.7/10
Rolling Stone	4/5 stars
The Village Voice	D−

=== Contemporary reception ===
If I Could Only Remember My Name was initially panned by many music critics. Writing for Rolling Stone, Lester Bangs claimed that "the playing is sloppy as hell… Crosby’s singing here is even blander and more monotonously one-dimensional than Stills’ on his solo album," concluding that it is "not likely to go down in history, but it is not a bad album." He memorably deemed it "a perfect aural aid to digestion when you're having guests over for dinner, provided they’re brothers and sisters enough to get behind it, of course." Village Voice critic Robert Christgau gave the album a D− rating and dismissed it as a "disgraceful performance". Crosby has said of the contemporaneous reviews: "They were looking for another record that was full of big, flashy lead guitar and blues licks and screaming lyrics ... [If I Could Only Remember My Name] was not where everything else was going, so they thought it was irrelevant."

=== Modern reception ===
The album went on to achieve cult status and praise from latter-day critics for its austere mood, eclectic improvisation and otherworldly harmony singing. In 2000, it was voted number 156 in the third edition of Colin Larkin's book All Time Top 1000 Albums. He stated "if you are not familiar with this miraculous record, please take the risk." A Head Heritage review of the 2006 reissue compares the album with Nick Drake and the acoustic material of Meddle-era Pink Floyd. It has been labeled a progenitor of the freak folk genre.

In 2010, Crosby's album was listed second, behind the Beatles' Revolver, on the "Top 10 Pop Albums of All Time" published in the Vatican City newspaper L'Osservatore Romano.

On 18 November 2013, Crosby appeared on an edition of the BBC Radio 4 programme Mastertapes, which was dedicated to the making of the album. The following day, he took part in the programme’s "B-side" edition, answering audience questions and performing songs from the album. In 2016, Japanese musician Cornelius included If I Could Only Remember My Name in his list of "10 Albums Everyone Needs to Hear".

In 2019, the album's title was partly adopted for the Cameron Crowe documentary on Crosby, David Crosby: Remember My Name.

== Track listing ==
All songs written by David Crosby except where noted

Side one
No.	Title	Writer(s)	Length
1.	"Music Is Love"	Graham Nash, Neil Young, David Crosby	3:16
2.	"Cowboy Movie"		8:02
3.	"Tamalpais High (At About 3)"		3:28
4.	"Laughing"		5:20

Side two
No.	Title	Writer(s)	Length
5.	"What Are Their Names"	Neil Young, Jerry Garcia, Phil Lesh, Michael Shrieve, David Crosby	4:09
6.	"Traction in the Rain"		3:40
7.	"Song with No Words (Tree with No Leaves)"		5:53
8.	"Orleans"	Traditional, arranged by David Crosby	1:56
9.	"I'd Swear There Was Somebody Here"		1:19

2006 reissue bonus track
No.	Title	Length
10.	"Kids and Dogs"	7:01

2021 50th anniversary edition bonus disc
No.	Title	Length
1.	"Riff 1"	2:23
2.	"Tamalpais High (At About 3)"	1:54
3.	"Kids and Dogs"	3:08
4.	"Games"	3:17
5.	"Laughing"	3:59
6.	"Song with No Words (Tree with No Leaves)"	3:13
7.	"The Wall Song"	4:16
8.	"Where Will I Be?"	3:41
9.	"Cowboy Movie" (alternate version)	10:57
10.	"Bach Mode (Pre-Critical Mass)"	2:00
11.	"Coast Road"	5:16
12.	"Dancer"	5:03
13.	"Fugue"	2:03

== Personnel ==
Crosby describes the making of the album
from the BBC programme Mastertapes, November 18, 2013.

Musicians

- David Crosby – vocals, guitars
- Graham Nash – guitar, vocals (on "Music Is Love", "Tamalpais High", "Laughing", "What Are Their Names", "Traction in the Rain" and "Song with No Words")
- Jerry Garcia – electric guitar (on "Cowboy Movie", "Tamalpais High", "What Are Their Names" and "Song with No Words"); pedal steel guitar (on "Laughing"); guitars (on "Kids and Dogs"); vocal (on "What Are Their Names")
- Neil Young – guitars, vocals (on "Music Is Love" and "What Are Their Names"); bass, vibraphone, congas (on "Music Is Love")
- Jorma Kaukonen – electric guitar (on "Tamalpais High" and "Song with No Words")
- Laura Allen – autoharp, vocal (on "Traction in the Rain")
- Gregg Rolie – piano (on "Song with No Words")
- Phil Lesh – bass (on "Cowboy Movie", "Tamalpais High", "Laughing" and "What Are Their Names"); vocal (on "What Are Their Names")
- Jack Casady – bass (on "Song with No Words")
- Bill Kreutzmann – drums (on "Tamalpais High" and "Laughing"); tambourine (on "Cowboy Movie")
- Michael Shrieve – drums (on "What Are Their Names" and "Song with No Words")
- Mickey Hart – drums (on "Cowboy Movie")
- Joni Mitchell – vocals (on "Laughing" and "What Are Their Names")
- David Freiberg, Paul Kantner, Grace Slick – vocals (on "What Are Their Names")

Production

- David Crosby – producer
- Stephen Barncard – engineer
- Henry Lewy – additional engineering on "Music Is Love"
- Gary Burden – art direction, design
- Robert Hammer, Gary Burden, Henry Diltz, Herb Greene, Salli Sasche, Joel Bernstein, Graham Nash, Ronald Stone – photography
- Elliot Roberts, Ronald Stone – management
- David Geffen – direction

2006 reissue:

- Bill Dooley – CD mastering
- Steve Hall – DVD audio engineering
- Matthew Greenwald – liner notes

2021 reissue:

- Patrick Milligan, Joel Bernstein, Stephen Barncard – producers
- Dave Collins – mastering
- Jamie Howarth, John Chester – tape restoration and speed correction
- Steve Silberman – liner notes

== Charts ==
Chart performance for If I Could Only Remember My Name
Chart (1971)	Peak position
Australian Kent Music Report	13
Canadian RPM 100 Albums	8
Dutch Albums (Album Top 100)	7
Swedish Kvällstoppen Chart	12
US Billboard Top LPs	12
US Cash Box Top 100 Albums	9
US Record World Album Chart	9

Chart (2021)	Peak position
Belgian Albums (Ultratop Wallonia)	178
Hungarian Albums (MAHASZ)	29

Chart (2023)	Peak position
Swiss Albums (Schweizer Hitparade)	35

== Certification ==
Region	Certification	Certified units/sales
United States (RIAA)	Gold	500,000^{^}
^{^} Shipments figures based on certification alone.
