= Below Radar =

2002 EP by Helen Stellar

EP by Helen Stellar
- Recorded: 2002
- Label: Independent

Below Radar is an EP released independently by Helen Stellar in 2002. "IO (this time around)", the second track on the EP, features in the Cameron Crowe film Elizabethtown. It also appears on the soundtracks for Henry Poole is Here (2008) and Love Happens (2009). "Flutterby" appeared in episode 102 of the television show Friday Night Lights.

== Track listing ==
No.	Title	Length
1.	"Flutterby"
2.	"IO (this time around)"
3.	"Diane"
4.	"Temporary Solutions"
