= Helen Stellar =

- Origin: Los Angeles, California
- Genres: Indie pop, shoegaze, alternative
- Years active: 2001–present
- Labels: Independent, Vinyl Films
- Members: Jim Evens, Clif Clehouse, Dustin Robles, Eli Lhymn
- Website: Helen Stellar's Official website

Helen Stellar are a Los Angeles–based American band. The band members are Jim Evens (vocals and guitar), Clif Clehouse (drums), Dustin Robles (bass), and Eli Lhymn (guitar). Although unsigned, the group has enjoyed considerable radio and soundtrack success with support from tastemakers including DJ Nic Harcourt, and directors Cameron Crowe and Gregg Araki.

== History ==
Helen Stellar formed in Chicago in 2000 with an original line-up of Jim Evens, Clif Clehouse and Steve Bishop (bass). Evens and Clehouse worked together in a restaurant and Bishop and Evens had been school friends. After starting the band they moved to Madison, Wisconsin, where they focused on developing their music while working part-time jobs. In 2001 they sent their first independent release, The Newton EP, to Nic Harcourt, then host of KCRW's influential radio program Morning Becomes Eclectic. Credited with launching musical acts including Dido and Coldplay in the U.S., Harcourt played songs from The Newton EP on air. After seeing them perform live and in response to their popular reception, Harcourt invited Helen Stellar to play live on his show. The band recorded their second EP Below Radar in Madison in 2002 before buying a bus to tour California. Once on the West Coast the bus broke down. Without enough money to fix the vehicle or return home, Helen Stellar settled in Los Angeles. Steve Bishop left the band and in 2004 Dustin Robles joined as the new bass player. In 2005 Helen Stellar released the EP I’m Naut What I Seem. In 2009 guitarist Eli Lhymn joined the band.

An employee at Amoeba Music, Evens promoted Helen Stellar to customers. One of them was a friend of director Cameron Crowe's. Known for using unsigned and unknown artists—including The Smashing Pumpkins—in his soundtracks, Crowe said that finding Helen Stellar through his friend and loving the song “IO” from Below Radar was “probably the most random discovery of any piece of music we’ve used.” In 2005 Crowe added “IO (This Time Around)” to the soundtrack for his film Elizabethtown. There Helen Stellar joined company with musicians including Nancy Wilson, Tom Petty, Elton John, Ryan Adams and My Morning Jacket. “IO (This Time Around)” also appears on soundtracks for the films Henry Poole is Here (2008) and Love Happens (2009).

In 2006 Cameron Crowe released songs from Helen Stellar's three EPs along with several unreleased demos on a limited edition vinyl album entitled A Prayer to Myself, through his company Vinyl Films.

Independent auteur Gregg Araki, known for his tasteful film soundtracks, featured Helen Stellar in his 2010 film Kaboom which won the first Queer Palm award at the Cannes Film Festival. In the film the band appear singing “Our Secrets” from the I’m Naut What I Seem EP and the song appears on the film's largely shoegazer soundtrack alongside music by bands including Interpol and The Jesus and Mary Chain. Helen Stellar were central to creating the tone of the film. As Araki told The Guardian: “I write with music playing all the time, it's integral to the atmosphere and spirit of my movies."

During a brief band hiatus in 2008, Jim Evens worked on a side project. Under the name Jim, Son Of James, he released an EP called The Disappearing Twin.

Helen Stellar released their first full-length album If The Stars Could Speak, They Would Have Your Voice in 2010. “The Disappearing Twin” from this album also appears in Araki's film Kaboom.

== Discography ==
- "Pop Song," single (2001)
- The Newton EP, EP (2002)
- Below Radar, EP (2003)
- I'm Naut What I Seem, EP (2005)
- A Prayer To Myself, Double LP, limited edition (2006)
- A Prayer To Myself, CD, limited edition (2006)
- If The Stars Could Speak, They Would Have Your Voice (2010)
