= Songs of Rapture and Redemption: Rarities & Live =

Compilation album and live album by Judee Sill
- Released: April 6, 2018
- Recorded: 1971–1972
- Venue: Boston Music Hall, Boston, United States (live tracks)
- Genre: Christian music, folk
- Length: 70:41
- Language: English
- Label: Run Out Groove
- Producer: Henry Lewy

Judee Sill chronology
Live in London: The BBC Recordings 1972–1973 (2008)	Songs of Rapture and Redemption: Rarities & Live (2018)

Songs of Rapture and Redemption: Rarities & Live is a 2018 compilation album of American folk musician Judee Sill.

== Reception ==
Editors at AllMusic rated this album 4.5 out of 5 stars, with critic Thom Jurek writing that Sill "was able to sing without artifice, allowing the full weight of her songs to arrive at the listener clearly with enviable restraint" and in terms of this compilation, "the true gift here is the warm, rich, thoroughly remastered sound that should make even fans who have all of Sill's wondrous material seek it out in this format"; the site chose this as Best of 2018 in Compilations and Reissues. Jim Wirth of Uncut also rated this compilation 4.5 out of 5 stars, writing of the demos, "even in their unfinished form they are ruggedly perfect".

== Track listing ==
All songs written by Judee Sill.

1. Intro / "The Vigilante" (live) – 4:27 (Live at Boston Music Hall, October 3, 1971)
2. "Lady‐O" (live) – 2:45 (Live at Boston Music Hall, October 3, 1971)
3. "Enchanted Sky Machines" (live) – 6:58 (Live at Boston Music Hall, October 3, 1971)
4. "The Archetypal Man" (live) – 3:59 (Live at Boston Music Hall, October 3, 1971)
5. "Crayon Angels" (live) – 3:27 (Live at Boston Music Hall, October 3, 1971)
6. "The Lamb Ran Away with the Crown" (live) – 3:45 (Live at Boston Music Hall, October 3, 1971)
7. "Jesus Was a Cross Maker" (live) – 4:50 (Live at Boston Music Hall, October 3, 1971)
8. "The Pearl" – 1:49
9. "The Phoenix" – 2:38
10. "Jesus Was a Cross Maker" (Home Demo) – 3:27
11. "The Desperado" – 3:57
12. "The Kiss" (Solo Demo) – 4:15
13. "Down Where the Valley Are Low" (Solo Demo) – 4:49
14. "The Donor" (Solo Demo) – 4:44
15. "Soldier of the Heart" (Solo Demo) – 3:06
16. "The Phoenix" (Solo Demo) – 2:29
17. "The Vigilante" (Solo Demo) – 3:44
18. "The Pearl" (Solo Demo) – 1:58
19. "There's a Rugged Road" (Solo Demo) – 3:34

== Personnel ==
- Judee Sill – guitar, vocals, arrangement, production
- Henry Lewy – production
- Steve Stanley – art direction, graphic design

== See also ==
- List of 2018 albums
