= Bowling in Paris =

Studio album by Stephen Bishop
- Released: 1989
- Studio: Lighthouse (Los Angeles, California); The Sound Factory (Hollywood, California); The Farm (Surrey, England); Maison Rogue, Homeland, and Elephant (London, UK); AIR (Montserrat)
- Genre: Pop
- Length: 46:45
- Label: Atlantic
- Producer: Phil Collins; Gus Dudgeon; Nick Launay; Michael Omartian; Hugh Padgham

Stephen Bishop chronology
Best of Bish (1988)	Bowling in Paris (1989)	On and On: The Hits of Stephen Bishop (1994)

Bowling in Paris is an album by singer/songwriter Stephen Bishop, released by Atlantic Records in 1989. It was his first studio album released in America since 1980's Red Cab to Manhattan. Eric Clapton, Phil Collins, and Sting contributed to the album.

The album includes a re-recorded version of "Walking on Air", the original of which had appeared in the 1986 film The Boy Who Could Fly. The updated version, featuring Collins on drums and additional vocals, cracked the top 20 on the U.S. Adult Contemporary chart.

== Critical reception ==
Professional ratings
Review scores
Source	Rating
AllMusic	2/5 stars
The Virgin Encyclopedia of Popular Music	3/5 stars

The Edmonton Journal labeled the album "a morass of syrupy, wimpy love songs."

== Track listing ==
All songs written by Stephen Bishop, with additional contributors noted.

No.	Title	Writer(s)	Length
1.	"Mister Heartbreak"	Peter Rafelson	3:49
2.	"Think I Know What Love Is"	Jeff Jones	3:25
3.	"Kari"	Mark Spiro	4:00
4.	"Sleeping with Girls"		4:58
5.	"Parked Cars"		4:45
6.	"Walking on Air"		3:26
7.	"Innocent Lov"		3:57
8.	"Tip of the Iceberg"	Spiro, Steve Kipner	4:05
9.	"Love at a Distance"		4:47
10.	"Love on the Outside"		4:45
11.	"Hall Light"		4:48

== Personnel ==
Musicians

- Stephen Bishop – lead vocals, backing vocals (3, 7-10); electric guitar, pedal steel drone, harp, sitar, additional bass, drum programming and sequencing (4); acoustic guitar (7, 11)
- Michael Omartian – keyboards (1–3, 5, 7, 8, 10), drum programming (1–3, 5, 8, 10), backing vocals (3, 7), tambourine (7), acoustic piano (11), organ (11)
- Jeff Jacobs – additional synthesizers (2), additional bass (4)
- Pete Wingfield – keyboards (4)
- Adrian Lee – keyboards (6, 9)
- Michael Thompson – guitars (1, 3)
- Dann Huff – guitars (2)
- Martin Jenner – guitar effects (4)
- Dean Parks – guitars (5, 8)
- Ronnie Caryl – guitars (6, 9)
- Mathew Downs – guitars (7)
- Steve Lukather – rhythm guitar (7), guitar solo (7)
- Steve Bolton – electric guitar solo (9)
- Michael Landau – guitars (10)
- Eric Clapton – guitars (11)
- Nathan East – bass (4)
- Mo Foster – bass (6, 9)
- Joe Chemay – bass (7)
- Sting – bass (11), harmony vocals (11), additional lead vocals (11)
- Phil Collins – drums (4, 6, 9, 11), drum programming and sequencing (4), backing vocals (6, 9)
- Gus Dudgeon – drum programming and sequencing (4)
- Hugh Padgham – drum programming and sequencing (4)
- John Keane – drums (7)
- Dave Boruff – saxophone (10)
- Debby Boone – backing vocals (1)
- Suzanne Christian – backing vocals (1)
- Stacy Earl – backing vocals (1)
- Mark Spiro – backing vocals (3)
- Brenda Russell – backing vocals (4)
- Randy Crawford – backing vocals (4)

Production

- Michael Omartian – producer (1–3, 5, 7, 8, 10, 11)
- Phil Collins – producer (4, 6, 9, 11), liner notes
- Gus Dudgeon – producer (4)
- Hugh Padgham – producer (4, 6, 9), engineer
- Nick Launay – producer (11), engineer
- David Ahlert – engineer
- Charles Barrett – engineer
- Sid Barrett – engineer
- Kevin Becka – engineer
- Tchad Blake – engineer
- Doug Carlton – engineer
- Terry Christian – engineer
- Graham Dickson – engineer
- Steve Jackson –engineer
- David Leonard – engineer
- Steve Hall – mastering at Future Disc (North Hollywood, California)
- Chris Cuffaro – photography
