= Dreams Come True (Judee Sill album) =

Compilation album by Judee Sill
- Released: February 22, 2005
- Recorded: 1968–1974
- Genre: Folk
- Length: 67:07
- Label: Water
- Producer: Bill Plummer

Judee Sill chronology
Heart Food (1973)	Dreams Come True (2005)	Abracadabra: The Asylum Years (2006)

Professional ratings
Review scores
Source	Rating
Allmusic	4/5 stars

Dreams Come True is a posthumous album of music by the American singer-songwriter Judee Sill. A double CD released on Water Records in 2005, the album mainly contains work originally recorded in the 1970s as potential material for a third album on Asylum Records. A combination of Sill's health and drug problems and lack of interest in the market prevented the completion of the album but a renewed interest in her work led to the release of this set, which also includes film footage from 1973.

== Songs ==
Despite the lack of commercial success for Sill's two albums Judee Sill and Heart Food, which led to the end of her contract with Asylum Records and the end of her association with David Geffen, Sill's music was critically acclaimed and she continued to write songs.

Sill recorded early versions for a planned third album, Dreams Come True, in 1974 at Mike Nesmith's studios. Songs like "That's the Spirit" and "Things are Lookin' Up" show a more carefree approach in comparison to Sill's earlier songs, especially considering her frustration at her lack of commercial success.

The songs remained unfinished, but Jim O'Rourke undertook the task of mixing the material. He said: "I never thought to try and equal those (earlier recordings) except in spirit, how she seemed to like the colour of her instruments. I wanted the music to stand on its own and to be about nothing other than itself. And the moment of soloing up Judee's vocal track was, frankly, eerie. . . a serious thing! Not to be taken lightly."

The second disc is made up of rarities and home demos, including one of Sill's earliest songs, "Dead Time Bummer Blues", written about her experience in jail, which was recorded by the Los Angeles garage band the Leaves. It also features an early version of "Things are Lookin' Up", entitled "Sunny Side Up Luck", performed by Sill on clavinet in 1973.

== Track listing ==
All tracks written by Judee Sill except where noted.

Disc 1

1. "That's the Spirit" – 4:18
2. "I'm Over" – 3:38
3. "Apocalypse Express" – 2:48
4. "Living End" – 3:01
5. "Things are Lookin' Up" – 3:17
6. "Good Ship Omega" – 3:28
7. "Last Resort" – 2:33
8. "Til Dreams Come True" – 3:29
9. "Living End" (demo) – 4:08
10. "I'm Over" (demo) – 4:20
11. "Til Dreams Come True" (instrumental demo) – 3:24

Disc 2

1. "Dead Time Bummer Blues" – 2:30
2. "Sunny Side Up Luck" – 5:06
3. "Emerald River Dance" – 3:10
4. "Waterfall" – 3:09
5. "North Country" (Traditional) – 3:12
6. "Farmer's Daughter (The Chickens in the Garden)" (traditional) – 1:10
7. "Wreck of the FFV (Fast Flying Vestibule)" (traditional) – 3:13
8. "500 Miles" (Hedy West) – 2:01
9. "Oh Boy The Magician" (instrumental) – 5:10

== Personnel ==
- Judee Sill – acoustic guitar, piano, arranger, vocals, backing vocals, voices, clavinet, Farfisa organ, vocal arrangement, paintings, sketches
- Susan Armezzani – research, transcription
- James Armstrong – advisor
- Pat Blessing – video producer
- Lyn Gaza – editing, effects
- Judy Himmel – portrait photography
- Gary Hobish – mastering
- Art Johnson – arranger, electric guitar, backing vocals
- Kevin Kelly – drums, backing vocals
- Phred Lender – programming, authoring
- Marc McClure – backing vocals, vocal arrangement, bottleneck guitar
- Vicki McClure – backing vocals
- Jim O'Rourke – mixing
- Shannon Peltier – backing vocals
- Tommy Peltier – guitar, backing vocals, engineer, photography
- Bill Plummer – backing vocals, producer, bass
- Wesley Pouliot – portrait photography
- Emitt Rhodes – coordination, track engineer
- Patrick Roques – producer, art director, designer, photography
- Filippo Salvadori – executive producer
- Pat Thomas – executive producer
- Russ Tolman – copy editing
