= Save It for a Rainy Day =

"Save It for a Rainy Day" may refer to:

- "Save It for a Rainy Day" (Stephen Bishop song), a 1976 hit single by Stephen Bishop
- "Save It for a Rainy Day" (Kenny Chesney song), a 2015 song by Kenny Chesney
- "Save It for a Rainy Day" (The Jayhawks song), a 2003 song by The Jayhawks
- Save It for a Rainy Day (album), of 2002 by Maggie Reilly
