= Le Carillon de Vendôme =

French children's song dating from the 15th century

"Le Carillon de Vendôme", also known as "Les Cloches de Vendôme" or "Orléans", is a French children's song dating from the 15th century. It takes its name from the bells (cloches) of the town of Vendôme.

"Le Carillon de Vendôme" was written in the Kingdom of France to describe the last possessions of the Dauphin Charles in 1420. After the signing of the Treaty of Troyes during the Hundred Years' War, the Dauphin was left in possession of the cities of Orléans, Beaugency, Cléry, Vendôme, and Bourges. The song describes this state of affairs.

== Lyrics ==
The original lyrics were slightly different; "aujourd'hui" ("today") in the first line was replaced by "mes amis" ("my friends"), and the original third line was removed, which included the lyric "De tout son beau royaume ?" ("Of all his beautiful kingdom?"). The entire second stanza was also added later.

Mes amis, que reste-t-il ?
À ce Dauphin si gentil ?
Orléans, Beaugency,
Notre-Dame de Cléry,
Vendôme, Vendôme !

Les ennemis ont tout pris
Ne lui laissant par mépris
Qu'Orléans, Beaugency,
Notre-Dame de Cléry,
Vendôme, Vendôme !

My friends, what is left,
to the Dauphin, so kind?
Orléans, Beaugency,
Notre-Dame de Cléry,
Vendôme, Vendôme!

The enemies have taken everything
Leaving him nothing by contempt
But Orléans, Beaugency,
Notre-Dame de Cléry,
Vendôme, Vendôme!

== Other versions ==
In 1971, American singer David Crosby released the song under the title "Orleans" on his debut album, If I Could Only Remember My Name. Crosby reworked the song to only include the repetition of the cities left to the Dauphin. This led to other artists basing their cover versions on his arrangement, including French group Il était une fois's 1974 version of the song, titled "Colombes", which instead listed suburbs of Paris.

In 1938, Henri Nibelle wrote an organ piece on this theme, which he titled Carillon orléanais.

The names of famous fictional detectives are sung to the tune of the song in the French movie Towards Zero, titled L'Heure Zero in France.

Laurent Voulzy performed "Le Carillon de Vendôme" on his 2012 Lys & Love Tour.
