= Red Cab to Manhattan =

Studio album by Stephen Bishop
- Released: 1980
- Recorded: 1979
- Studio: The Power Station and Penny Lane Studios (New York City, New York); Sound Labs (Hollywood, California); AIR Studios (London, England)
- Genre: Pop
- Length: 42:55
- Label: Warner Bros.
- Producer: Mike Mainieri; Tommy LiPuma

Stephen Bishop chronology
Bish (1978)	Red Cab to Manhattan (1980)	Sleeping with Girls (1985)

Red Cab to Manhattan is the third album by singer/songwriter Stephen Bishop and his first for Warner Bros. Unlike his previous two albums, Careless and Bish, none of its tracks nor the album itself cracked the top 100 on the Billboard singles or albums charts. Like his previous albums, Bishop had some big names help on the album. Notable contributors include Eric Clapton, Phil Collins and Art Garfunkel.

== Reception ==
Professional ratings
Review scores
Source	Rating
AllMusic	3/5 stars
The Encyclopedia of Popular Music	3/5 stars
Rolling Stone	4/5 stars

Rolling Stone's Stephen Holden wrote that "[t]he new album is a dazzling breakthrough." Stating that "[o]n Red Cab to Manhattan, Stephen Bishop—pop music's most endearing wimp and an unabashed acolyte of Paul Simon and Paul McCartney—adds Steely Dan to his roster of idols." Noting that "[i]t's been ages since Paul McCartney wrote a love song as fetching as "Don't You Worry"... [a]nd "Red Cab to Manhattan" is as delicately shaded a mood piece as any of Paul Simon's miniatures." Concluding that "[t]hough Stephen Bishop still wears his idols on his sleeve, his sense of humor is unique."

== Track listing ==
All songs written by Stephen Bishop, except where noted.

No.	Title	Writer(s)	Length
1.	"The Big House"		3:45
2.	"Don't You Worry"		3:59
3.	"Thief in the Night"	Bishop, Judy Maizel	2:27
4.	"Send a Little Love My Way (Like Always)"		3:48
5.	"Let Her Go"		3:42
6.	"Little Moon"		3:08
7.	"The Story of a Boy in Love"		5:02
8.	"Living in the Land of Abe Lincoln"		3:06
9.	"Red Cab to Manhattan"		4:40
10.	"Sex Kittens Go to College"		1:19
11.	"City Girl"		4:58
12.	"My Clarinet"		3:01

== Personnel ==
Musicians and Vocalists

- Stephen Bishop – vocals, backing vocals (1, 2, 4, 6–8), acoustic guitar (1, 2, 4–12), electric guitar (1–3, 7), acoustic piano (2), trombone (9)
- Ed Walsh – synthesizer programming, koto (9)
- Don Grolnick – acoustic piano (1, 3, 5), Fender Rhodes (1, 8, 9)
- Warren Bernhardt – Fender Rhodes (4, 7, 11), clavinet (11)
- Gary Brooker – Fender Rhodes (6, 10), acoustic piano (10)
- Chris Stainton – acoustic piano (6), acoustic piano on prelude (7), Fender Rhodes (10)
- Neil Larsen – acoustic piano (7)
- Sid McGinnis – electric guitar (1, 5, 11)
- David Spinozza – electric guitar (1–3, 5, 8, 9), acoustic guitar (2)
- Hugh McCracken – electric slide guitar (2)
- Dean Parks – electric guitar fills (4)
- Eric Clapton – electric guitar (6, 10)
- Jeff Mironov – electric guitar (7, 11)
- Buzz Feiten – electric guitar solo (11)
- Willie Weeks – bass guitar (1, 3, 5, 8, 9)
- Jeffrey Stanton – bass guitar (2), backing vocals (2, 4)
- Dennis Belfield – bass guitar (4)
- John Giblin – bass guitar (6, 10)
- Neil Jason – bass guitar (7, 11)
- Andy Newmark – drums (1–3, 5, 8, 9)
- Steve Gadd – drums (4)
- Phil Collins – drums (6, 10)
- Chris Parker – drums (11)
- Lenny Castro – percussion (4, 7, 8, 11)
- Mike Mainieri – marimba (1, 8), synthesizers (4, 11), vibraphone (4, 12), cymbals (8), timpani (8), vocoder (11), contrabass marimba (12)
- Clive Anstree – cello (6)
- Phoebe Snow – backing vocals (3)
- David Lasley – backing vocals (4, 11)
- Arnold McCuller – backing vocals (4, 11)
- Art Garfunkel – backing vocals (9)

Music arrangements

- Stephen Bishop – rhythm track arrangements
- Mike Mainieri – rhythm track arrangements, flute and piccolo arrangements (8)
- Jeffrey Stanton – additional arrangements
- Don Sebesky – horn arrangements and conductor (3)
- Gene Page – additional arrangements (4)
- Jeremy Lubbock – string and woodwind arrangements (9)

== Production ==
- Tommy LiPuma – producer
- Mike Mainieri – producer
- Scott Litt – mixing, recording (1, 3–5, 7–9, 11, 12)
- Alan Vonner – recording (2)
- Steve Churchyard – recording (6, 10)
- Renate Blauel – assistant engineer
- Jason Corsaro – assistant engineer
- Lucy Laurie – assistant engineer
- Chip Orlando – assistant engineer
- John Terrelle – assistant engineer
- Bob Ludwig – mastering at Masterdisk (New York, NY)
- Christine Martin – production coordinator
- Noel Newbolt – production coordinator
- John Kosh – art direction, design
- Lynn Goldsmith – cover photography
- Elizabeth Lennard – sleeve photography
- Trudy Green – management
