= Henri Nibelle =

French organist, choral conductor and composer

- Born: 6 November 1883; Briare, France
- Died: 18 November 1967 (aged 84); Nice, France
- Education: Conservatoire de Paris
- Occupations: Composer; Organist; Choral conductor
- Organizations: Saint-François-de-Sales

Henri Jules Joseph Nibelle (6 November 1883 – 18 November 1967) was a French organist, choral conductor and composer.

== Biography ==
Born in Briare, son and grandson of organists, Henri Nibelle attended the école Niedermeyer as early as 1898, before entering the Conservatoire de Paris, where in 1906 he won a first prize on fugue in the class of Fauré and a 1st accessit of organ in 1910 in the class of Guilmant. At the École Niedermeyer, Henri Nibelle was a student of Henri Büsser, with Maurice Le Boucher, Defosse, Roger Pénau. He also studied with Louis Vierne who dedicated to him Caprice, the third of the Pièces de Fantaisie for organ Op. 51. He began his career as an organist on the choir organ of the Versailles Cathedral in 1907. Two years later, he was appointed titular of the Saint-Vincent-de-Paul church, then became organist at the Grand Organ of Saint-François-de-Sales in 1912, and succeeded Isidore Massuelle as maître de chapelle of this same church in 1931.

Having become almost blind, he left Saint-François-de-Sales in 1959 to retire to Nice and dedicate himself to the composition of religious works: short masses, solemn masses, psalms, motets, spiritual hymns, etc.

Nibelle died in Nice on 18 November 1967 aged 84.

== Works ==
Music for chorus

- Mass "Ecce Sacerdos magnus",
- Mass "Te Deum"
- Mass "Ave Maris Stella"
- Messe en l'honneur de Jeanne d'Arc. (ed. 1951)
- settings of Psalm 117, Pie Jesu, Ave verum corpus, Ave Maria
- Prose "Inviolata"

Music for organ (and pump organ)

- Offertory in D minor in "Maîtres contemporains de l'orgue", vol. 1 (1912)
- 50 Pièces sur des thèmes liturgiques des dimanches et les fêtes de l’année for organ or punp organ, 1935 (Schola Cantorum de Paris publishings).
- Carillon orléanais. (1938)
- Toccata (1947)
- Preludes for the Holy Sacrament
- 2 Préludes et fugues
- Prelude et fugue on "Alma Redemptoris Mater"
- Prélude et fugue on "Salve Regina"
- Rhapsodies de Noël
- Variations on a Chant de Noël (1960)
- Messe pour orgue en l’honneur de la Sainte-Vierge
- Toccata and Fugue on "Regina Caeli"
- Toccata on "Victimae paschali laudes"
- Les Dimanches et Fêtes de l'organiste grégorien, 8 vol. (Schola Cantorum)

== Sources ==
- Musica et Memoria Denis Havard de la Montagne, Les Organistes et les maîtres de chapelle de l’église Saint-Vincent-de-Paul à Paris, Les Cahiers Boëllmann-Gigout, n°2/3, December 1997–March 1998.
- Marc Honegger, Dictionnaire de la musique, vol. II - Les Hommes et leurs Œuvres L-Z, Paris, Bordas, 1970.
