= David Crosby: Remember My Name =

2019 documentary film

- Film poster
- Directed by: A. J. Eaton
- Produced by: Cameron Crowe; Michele Farinola; Greg Mariotti
- Starring: David Crosby
- Cinematography: Ian Coad; Edd Lukas
- Edited by: Elisa Bonora; Veronica Pinkham
- Music by: Marcus Eaton; Bill Laurance
- Production companies: BMG; Vinyl Films; PCH Films
- Distributed by: Sony Pictures Classics
- Release dates: January 26, 2019 (Sundance); July 19, 2019 (United States)
- Running time: 95 minutes
- Country: United States
- Language: English
- Box office: $732,793

David Crosby: Remember My Name is a 2019 documentary about the musician David Crosby. It was directed by A.J. Eaton and produced by Cameron Crowe. The title is a play on the title of Crosby's 1971 album If I Could Only Remember My Name.

The film had its festival debut at the 2019 Sundance Film Festival. It is distributed by Sony Pictures Classics.

== Reception ==
From its premiere at Sundance and subsequent theatrical release, the film garnered very positive reviews. As of October 2021, 93% of the 94 critical reviews compiled on Rotten Tomatoes are positive, with an average rating of 7.9/10. The website's critics consensus reads: "Refreshingly candid and disarmingly reflective, David Crosby: Remember My Name offers an absorbing look at its subject's life and career." Peter Travers at Rolling Stone called it "one of the best rock docs of all time." Owen Gleiberman at Variety called it "a moving and elegiac rock-nostalgia documentary and that "everything comes full circle, and to the millennials, David Crosby isn't just some boring old hippie — he's more like the Gandalf of Woodstock." Steve Pond of TheWrap wrote, "Think of it as the film version of the final albums made by Leonard Cohen and David Bowie, who made wrenching final statements that they likely knew would be their last." Jordan Ruimy of The Playlist opined, "Eaton and Crowe, no doubt working together closely, compose a beautiful hymnal. It's as if you're hearing a powerful and evocative spiritual of remorse sung right before your very ears and eyes."

== Accolades ==
The film was nominated for a Grammy Award in the Best Music Film category for the 62nd Annual Grammy Awards.

Award	Category	Nominee	Result	Ref.
62nd Annual Grammy Awards	Best Music Film	A.J. Eaton, Director; Cameron Crowe, Michele Farina & Greg Mariotti, Producers	Nominated	
2019 Critics' Choice Movie Awards	Most Compelling Living Subject of a Documentary	David Crosby	Won	
2019 Critics' Choice Movie Awards	Best First Documentary Feature	A.J. Eaton	Nominated	
2019 Critics' Choice Movie Awards	Best Documentary Feature	David Crosby: Remember My Name	Nominated	
Boulder International Film Festival	Best Music Documentary	A.J. Eaton	Won	
2019 Critics' Choice Movie Awards	Best Documentary Feature	A.J. Eaton	Nominated	
2019 Sundance Film Festival	U.S. Documentary Competition	A.J. Eaton	Nominated	
