= Live in London: The BBC Recordings 1972–1973 =

Live album and compilation by Judee Sill
- Released: May 22, 2007
- Recorded: March 23, 1972 (Paris Theatre); April 5, 1972 (Aeolian Hall); February 15 (Golders Green Hippodrome)
- Venue: Aeolian Hall Studio 2, London, England, United Kingdom; Golders Green Hippodrome, London, England, United Kingdom; Paris Theatre, London, England, United Kingdom
- Genre: Christian music, folk
- Length: 78:33
- Language: English
- Label: Water; Troubadour
- Producer: Filippo Salvadori; Carlton P. Sandercock

Judee Sill chronology
Abracadabra: The Asylum Years (2006)	Live in London: The BBC Recordings 1972–1973 (2007)	Songs of Rapture and Redemption: Rarities & Live (2018)

Live in London: The BBC Recordings 1972–1973 is a 2007 compilation album of American folk musician Judee Sill.

== Reception ==
Editors at AllMusic rated this album 3.5 out of 5 stars, with critic Thom Jurek writing that "it's wonderful to finally have an official release of the late Judee Sill's recordings done for the BBC during 1972 and 1973" and praising the recordings as "heartbreaking", but stating that the 1973 recording is the weakest of the bunch. Writing for Pitchfork Media, Stephen M. Deusner scored this release a 7.0 out of 10 and stated that Sill is "perfectly at home in song", but he criticizes the compilation for being arranged out of chronological sequence. From PopMatters, D. M. Edwards gave Live in London a 7 out of 10, writing that it "should lead newcomers to seek out Sill’s first two studio albums and its beguiling intimacy certainly won’t disappoint those already familiar with her work". Judy Berman of TinyMixTapes also wrote that this album displays that Sill "deserves this newfound attention" and states that the "only major problem with the album is in the compilation" and its arrangement across the different recording sessions.

== Track listing ==
All songs written by Judee Sill.

1. "Jesus Was a Cross Maker" – 3:49 (Paris Theatre, for In Concert, broadcast April 1, 1972)
2. "Lady-O" – 4:14 (Aeolian Hall, for In Session with Bob Harris, broadcast April 17, 1972)
3. "The Lamb Ran Away with the Crown" – 3:58 (Paris Theatre)
4. "Enchanted Sky Machines" – 4:49 (Paris Theatre)
5. "The Kiss" – 4:22 (Paris Theatre)
6. "Down Where the Valleys Are Low" – 5:56 (Paris Theatre)
7. "There's a Rugged Road" – 4:23 (Golders Green, for In Concert, broadcast March 12, 1973)
8. "The Phoenix" – 3:18 (Golders Green)
9. "The Donor" – 6:28 (Golders Green)
10. "Soldier of the Heart" – 4:13 (Golders Green)
11. Interview with Bob Harris – 4:42 (Aeolian Hall)
12. "Enchanted Sky Machines" – 4:11 (Aeolian Hall)
13. "The Kiss" – 3:58 (Aeolian Hall)
14. "Down Where the Valleys Are Low" – 4:54 (Aeolian Hall)
15. "The Phoenix" – 2:31 (Aeolian Hall)
16. "Jesus Was a Cross Maker" – 3:26 (Aeolian Hall)
17. "The Kiss" – 5:05 (Golders Green)
18. "Down Where the Valleys Are Low" – 4:16 (Golders Green)

A 2015 reissue includes a previously unreleased recording of "The Pearl" (2:05), from February 1973 and shuffles the track listing

== Personnel ==
- Judee Sill – vocals, acoustic guitar, piano
- Patrick Bird – remastering (2015 reissue)
- Les Clark – artwork (2015 reissue)
- Gary Hobish – mastering
- Patrick Roques – design
- Michael Saltzman – liner notes
- Filippo Salvadori – compilation production
- Carlton P. Sandercock – compilation production

== See also ==
- List of 2007 albums
