= On and On (Stephen Bishop song) =

1977 single by Stephen Bishop

- Side A of the US single

Single by Stephen Bishop

from the album Careless
- B-side: "Little Italy"
- Released: May 1977
- Recorded: 1976
- Genre: Soft rock; pop
- Length: 3:00
- Label: ABC
- Songwriter: Stephen Bishop
- Producers: Henry Lewy, Stephen Bishop

Stephen Bishop singles chronology
"Save It for a Rainy Day" (1976)	"On and On" (1977)	"Never Letting Go" (1977)

"On and On" is a song by American singer-songwriter Stephen Bishop. The song, from his debut album Careless, became a major hit, peaking at number 11 on the U.S. Billboard Hot 100 and spending 28 weeks on the chart. In Canada, the song peaked at number 6.

On the U.S. Easy Listening chart, "On and On" peaked at number two. It reached number three on the corresponding Canadian chart.

Despite not reaching the top ten, it was the 30th ranked single on the Billboard magazine year-end chart for 1977 as a result of its almost seven-month chart run.

== Personnel ==
- Stephen Bishop – lead and backing vocals, acoustic guitar
- John Barlow Jarvis – electric piano
- Andrew Gold – electric guitar
- Michael Staton – steel guitar
- Mac Cridlin – bass
- Larry Brown – drums
- Victor Feldman – percussion, vibraphone, marimba

== Chart performance ==
=== Weekly charts ===
Chart (1977)	Peak position
Canadian RPM Top Singles	6
Canadian RPM Adult Contemporary	3
New Zealand	29
U.S. Billboard Hot 100	11
U.S. Billboard Easy Listening	2
U.S. Cashbox Top 100	5

=== Year-end charts ===
Chart (1977)	Rank
Canada RPM Top Singles	71
U.S. Billboard Hot 100	30
U.S. Billboard Adult Contemporary	6
U.S. Cash Box	28

== Cover versions ==
- Kenny Rankin covered "On and On" in 1977. His version charted concurrently with Stephen Bishop's original, reaching No. 110 on the U.S. Billboard Bubbling Under chart.
- British reggae group Aswad took their version of the song to No. 25 in the UK in August 1989.
- Keith Urban recorded the song for his 2026 album, Flow State.
