= Marcus Eaton =

American musician

Marcus Eaton is an American singer-songwriter, guitarist and producer. He composed the original score to the award-winning documentary David Crosby: Remember My Name. He also produced the Stephen Bishop album Thimk.

== Personal life ==
Eaton is from Pocatello, Idaho.

== Popularity ==
Eaton gained worldwide attention after video clips posted to social media showed Eaton performing on guitar the themes to The Last Of The Mohicans and The Mandalorian using a unique Pickaso Guitar Bow and TonewoodAmp technique. Collectively the videos have garnered over five million views.

David Crosby had called Eaton “one of the best young singer-songwriters in America – maybe even the world.”

== Discography ==
=== Albums ===
- Story of Now (2006)
- As If You Had Wings (2011)
- Versions of the Truth (2018)
- Remember My Name - Original Film Score (2019)
- Invisible Lines (2020)
- What is Real (2025)
