= Everybody Needs Love (Stephen Bishop song) =

Single by Stephen Bishop

from the album Bish
- B-side: "Only the Heart Within You"
- Released: September 1978
- Genre: Disco
- Label: ABC Records
- Songwriter: Stephen Bishop
- Producer: Stephen Bishop

Stephen Bishop singles chronology
"Never Letting Go" (1977)	"Everybody Needs Love" (1978)	"Animal House" (1978)

"Everybody Needs Love" is a song by American singer-songwriter Stephen Bishop. The song was the first of two singles from his second album, Bish, the other being "Looking for the Right One".

"Everybody Needs Love" peaked at number 32 on the U.S. Billboard Hot 100 The song performed better on the Adult Contemporary, peaking at number five in the U.S.

== Personnel ==
- Stephen Bishop – lead and backing vocals, acoustic guitar
- John Barlow Jarvis – acoustic piano
- Greg Phillinganes – electric piano, synthesizers
- Ray Parker Jr. – guitar
- Michael Sembello – guitar
- Nathan Watts – bass
- Raymond Pounds – drums
- Paulinho da Costa – percussion
- Leah Kunkel – backing vocals
- Michael Staton – backing vocals
- Jeffrey Staton – backing vocals

== Chart performance ==
=== Weekly charts ===
Chart (1978)	Peak position
U.S. Billboard Hot 100	32
U.S. Billboard Adult Contemporary	5

=== Year-end charts ===
Chart (1978)	Rank
Canada	194
