= Judee Sill =

American singer-songwriter (1944–1979)

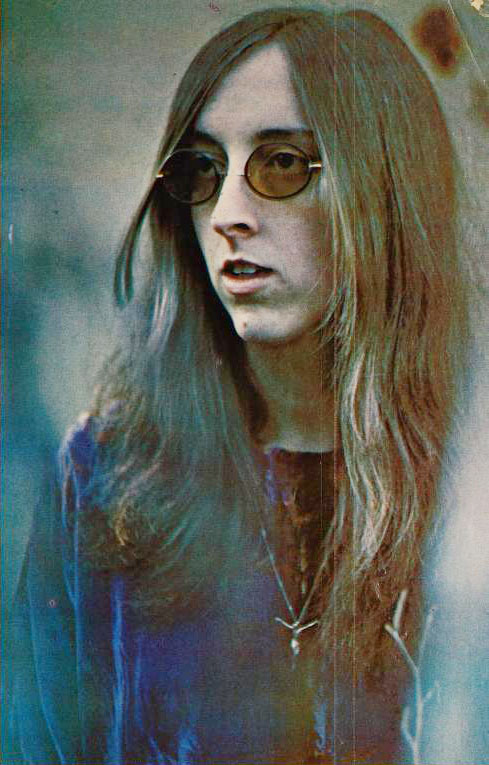
- Sill, c. 1973

Background information
- Born: Judith Lynne Sill; October 7, 1944; Los Angeles, California, U.S.
- Died: November 23, 1979 (aged 35) Los Angeles, California, U.S.
- Genres: Folk; folk-pop; country; baroque pop; folk rock
- Occupations: Singer-songwriter; composer
- Instruments: Vocals; guitar; keyboards
- Years active: 1960s–1970s
- Label: Asylum

Judith Lynne Sill (October 7, 1944 – November 23, 1979) was an American singer-songwriter and composer. She was influenced by Bach, and wrote lyrics drawing on Christian themes of rapture and redemption.

While signed to David Geffen's label Asylum, Sill released two albums, Judee Sill (1971) and Heart Food (1973). Both albums were acclaimed but commercially unsuccessful.

In 1974, Sill recorded demos for a third album, which went unfinished. Sill struggled with addiction through much of her life and died of a drug overdose in 1979. She did not find commercial success, and at the time of her death, no obituary was published; however, several artists have since cited her as an influence. Her found studio tape, demos and other rarities were released on the 2005 collection Dreams Come True.

== Early life ==
Judith Lynne Sill was born in Studio City, Los Angeles, on October 7, 1944, and spent her early childhood in Oakland, California. Her father, Milford "Bud" Sill, an importer of exotic animals for use in films, owned Bud's bar in Oakland, where Sill learned to play the piano. When Milford died of pneumonia in 1952, Judee's mother, Oneta, moved with her and her older brother Dennis to Los Angeles, where Oneta met and married the Tom and Jerry animator Kenneth Muse.

In a 1972 Rolling Stone interview, Sill described her home life after her mother's remarriage as unhappy and frequently violent due to physical fights with her parents. She transferred from Birmingham High School in Van Nuys to a private school, where she met other rebellious teenagers. Either during high school or after her graduation (depending on the source), Sill and a man she had met committed a series of armed robberies of businesses such as liquor stores and gas stations. They were arrested and she spent nine months in reform school, where she was a church organist and "learned a lot of good music", including gospel music.

After being released, Sill briefly attended San Fernando Valley Junior College as an art major. She also played piano in the school orchestra and worked in a piano bar. In 1964, after her mother died, Sill left college and moved out of her stepfather's home. She started taking LSD and other drugs, moved in with an LSD dealer and joined a jazz trio.

In April 1966, Sill married the pianist Robert Maurice "Bob" Harris. The couple lived in Las Vegas for a time, and both developed heroin addictions within months. When Sill moved back to California, she resorted to crime to support her addiction, including robbery, sex work, forgery and fraud. A string of narcotics and forgery offenses sent her to jail, and she learned that her brother Dennis had suddenly died of a liver infection. When she was released, she immediately set to work as a song composer.

== Career ==
Sill encountered Graham Nash and David Crosby and toured with them for a time as their opening act. After some initial interest from Atlantic Records, David Geffen offered her a contract with his new Asylum label. She sold her song "Lady-O" to the Turtles, and was featured on the cover of Rolling Stone. Harris worked on her first album and was involved with the Turtles.

Graham Nash produced her first album's first single, "Jesus Was a Cross Maker", released to radio on October 1, 1971. The album Judee Sill was released on September 15, 1971. It featured Sill's voice in multiple overdubs. She worked with the engineer Henry Lewy, noted for his work with Joni Mitchell throughout the 1970s. She opened for Jimmy Webb during two stints at the Troubadour to promote the just-released album, and though well received in her live performances the album was not a commercial success. In January and February 1973, she was the support act on a tour of the UK by Roy Harper.

Sill took over the orchestration and arrangements on her second album, Heart Food, which included "The Donor". Heart Food was released in March 1973 and was critically acclaimed, but sold poorly, leading to the end of her association with Geffen and Asylum Records. Sill's friends said she lacked the resilience to cope with poor sales and bad reviews, and that she was dropped after she refused to perform as an opening act, a task she disliked. Sill and Geffen's personal relationship also deteriorated, with Judee allegedly camping out on Geffen's front lawn to protest his lack of support for Heart Food. Their relationship came to an end after Sill, who was openly bisexual, allegedly referred to the then-publicly closeted Geffen using a homophobic epithet; whether this occurred onstage, or on the radio, and what exactly was said is disputed.

Sill continued to write songs, and in 1974, began to record material for a third album at the studio of Michael Nesmith. By this time, Sill was once again suffering from drug abuse and other health problems, and her music was not regarded as marketable. She also was beginning to lose interest in music and focus on other pursuits, including theosophy and animals. In the mid-1970s, she worked for a time as a cartoonist with a Los Angeles animation studio. Her 1974 recordings were never finished. Twenty-six years after Sill's 1979 death, the unfinished songs were mixed by Jim O'Rourke and released, along with a collection of rarities and home demos, as the album Dreams Come True on the Water label.

== Personal life and death ==
Sill's personal life was turbulent, and she was affected by the early deaths of her father, mother, and brother. Sill said she had been married twice, saying in interviews that she was briefly married either during or just after high school to a classmate, that her parents had the marriage annulled, and that he later died in a rafting accident. A friend wrote that she claimed to have married her robbery partner as a teenager. Sill's second marriage was to Robert Maurice "Bob" Harris on April 27, 1966, in Clark County, Nevada. They divorced in 1972.

Sill was bisexual. Her romance with the singer-songwriter JD Souther, along with the novel The Last Temptation of Christ, inspired her song "Jesus Was a Cross Maker". Souther later wrote the song "Something in the Dark" about her. She had a long-term relationship with the poet David Omer Bearden, who contributed lyrics to Heart Food and toured and performed with her; Sill dedicated Heart Food to him. As Asylum's first published artist, Sill also had a close friendship with David Geffen, and wrote "David Geffen, I love you" in the sleeve for her first album. Their relationship soured after comments she made in frustration about not receiving enough promotion for her second UK tour.

After a series of car accidents and a failed back surgery, Sill struggled with drug addiction and dropped out of the music scene. She died of a drug overdose, or "acute cocaine and codeine intoxication", on November 23, 1979, at her apartment on Morrison Street in North Hollywood. The Los Angeles coroner ruled her death a suicide, taking into account a note found near her body, but some who knew her have contended that the note, which reportedly contained "a meditation on rapture, the hereafter, and the innate mystery of life", was not a suicide note but rather a diary entry or song concept. Her ashes were scattered into the Pacific Ocean after a ceremony organized by a few close friends at the Self-Realization Fellowship in Pacific Palisades, Los Angeles. By the time of Sill's death, she had become so obscure that no obituary was published, and for many years, a number of her friends were unaware she had died. The New York Times belatedly published an obituary of Sill in 2020, as part of their "Overlooked No More" series of notable historic people whose deaths had gone unreported by the Times.

== Musical style ==
Sill was classically trained. She combined an appreciation of classical composers such as Bach with seventies California music, a style she described as "country-cult-baroque". The critic Barney Hosykns wrote that her songs "suggest a hippie update of the cosmic epiphanies of William Blake or the metaphysical ecstasies of Henry Vaughan".

Sill believed that the purpose of music was to glorify God. Though her music is not Christian rock, it often references Christian beliefs and uses Christ as "a symbol of the elusive, yearned-for lover". She was included in The Billboard Guide to Contemporary Christian Music; her faith was debatable, but she made frequent use of Christian symbolism in her lyrics, combined with a "lack of sensuality" and the "denial of the physical". The Washington Post described her music as "intensely devotional... she wrote her own sort of hymns — guileless, urgent, naked, absolutely personal".

== Influence and legacy ==
Although Sill's music was not commercially successful, a number of later songwriters have been fans of her work, including Andy Partridge, Liz Phair, Warren Zevon, Shawn Colvin, Steven Wilson, Robin Pecknold, Daniel Rossen, Bill Callahan and Terra Spencer.

Nick Lowe said that "Jesus Was a Crossmaker" was an influence on his Brinsley Schwarz song "(What's So Funny 'Bout) Peace, Love, and Understanding". In 2004, the British music critic Barney Hoskyns wrote that had Sill been "as male and pretty" as Nick Drake, another songwriter who did not find success while he was alive, her music would now be as popular. Hoskyns wrote that songs such as "The Pearl", "The Phoenix" and "Soldier of the Heart" were "as beautiful as Drake's but far more schooled and complex".

In 2016, the supergroup case/lang/veirs released an eponymous album with a song about Sill titled "Song for Judee". Written by Laura Veirs, the song details the hardships of Sill's life and mentions Sill's song "The Kiss" from the album Heart Food.

=== Posthumous releases ===
Terry Hounsome's 1981 book New Rock Record lists a Sill album titled Tulips From Amsterdam. Unsure of the information's source, Hounsome later removed the listing from his database.

Sill appears on Tommy Peltier's Chariot of Astral Light (featuring Judee Sill), which was recorded in the 1970s but not released until 2005 on the Black Beauty label. She contributed guitar, organ and backing vocals to six tracks on the album and is pictured with Peltier on the cover. Also in 2005, Sill's unfinished recordings, mixed by Jim O'Rourke, were released along with other rarities and unreleased demos as Dreams Come True, a two-CD set on Water Records. Sill's two original albums, Judee Sill and Heart Food, were released that year as individual CDs, each with bonus tracks, on the Rhino Handmade label.

In 2006, Rhino released the compilation Abracadabra: The Asylum Years. The Guardian gave it five out of five, and wrote that "in death [Sill] is slowly finding the audience she always craved". In 2007, an album of Sill's live performances performed for the BBC was released as Live in London: The BBC Recordings 1972–1973. In 2017 the independent record label Intervention Records released 180-gram double 45 rpm LP and SACD reissues of Sill's self-titled album and Heart Food.

In 2022, the documentary film Lost Angel: The Genius of Judee Sill, by Andy Brown and Brian Lindstrom was completed. It was released in 2024. Nine years in the making, it coalesces past reporting on Sill along with including newly unearthed interviews and personal journals.

== Discography ==
Studio albums

- Judee Sill (1971)
- Heart Food (1973)

Others

- Dreams Come True (2005)
- Abracadabra: The Asylum Years (2006)
- Live in London: The BBC Recordings 1972–1973 (2007)
- Songs of Rapture and Redemption: Rarities & Live (2018)
