= Bish (album) =

Studio album by Stephen Bishop
- Released: 1978
- Recorded: Cherokee, Hollywood; Criteria, Miami
- Genre: Pop
- Length: 44:25
- Label: ABC
- Producer: Stephen Bishop

Stephen Bishop chronology
Careless (1976)	Bish (1978)	Red Cab to Manhattan (1980)

Bish is the second album by singer/songwriter Stephen Bishop. The lead single, "Everybody Needs Love", peaked at No. 32 on the Billboard Hot 100 singles chart. and number five on the U.S. Adult Contemporary chart. It did better in Canada, reaching No. 29 and peaking at number two on the Canadian Adult Contemporary chart. The album itself rose to No. 35 on the Billboard pop albums chart.

Notable contributors to the album include Art Garfunkel, Chaka Khan, Natalie Cole and Michael McDonald. At the end of the track "Vagabond from Heaven", a large group, "The Whistling Bishettes", is heard. The group includes several famous non-musicians: actress Carrie Fisher, film director John Landis and then-Rolling Stone writer Cameron Crowe.

== "Looking for the Right One" ==
"Looking for the Right One" was the second single from Bish. It was released in both Canada and the UK but it did not chart. Three years earlier, Art Garfunkel had recorded the song. His original rendition of Bishop's composition was included as the B-side of his 1975 cover hit, "I Only Have Eyes For You" (U.S. #18, #1 AC). Bishop contributed backing vocals on Garfunkel's version, who returned the favor on Bishop's rendition.

== Reception ==
Professional ratings
Review scores
Source	Rating
AllMusic	3/5 stars
The Encyclopedia of Popular Music	3/5 stars

Rolling Stone's Ken Tucker wrote, "Stephen Bishop's second album is so ambitious and self-assured that it's easy to overlook the chances it takes." Adding that its "mixture of sentiment and aggressiveness... makes it so intriguing a pop disc." Concluding that "Stephen Bishop is well on his way, and he possesses something all his exemplars lack: a serenely nutty sense of humor."

== Track listing ==
All songs written by Stephen Bishop, except where noted.

No.	Title	Writer(s)	Length
1.	"If I Only Had a Brain"	Harold Arlen, Yip Harburg	1:40
2.	"Losing Myself in You"		3:58
3.	"Looking for the Right One"		3:50
4.	"Everybody Needs Love"		3:42
5.	"Guitar Interlude"		0:27
6.	"A Fool at Heart"		5:34
7.	"What Love Can Do"		2:53
8.	"Vagabond from Heaven"		4:24
9.	"Bish's Hideaway"		3:57
10.	"Only the Heart Within You"		4:11
11.	"Recognized"		0:53
12.	"I've Never Known a Nite Like This"		4:24
13.	"When I Was in Love"		4:32

== Personnel ==
Musicians

- Stephen Bishop – vocals (1–4, 6–13), acoustic guitars (1, 3–7, 9, 10, 12), trombone (1), guitars (2, 8, 13), electric guitars (9)
- Greg Phillinganes – synthesizers (2, 4, 8), electric piano (4, 8)
- David Foster – electric piano (2), acoustic piano (3)
- John Barlow Jarvis – electric piano (3), acoustic piano (4, 6)
- Bill Payne – electric piano (6, 9)
- Steve Porcaro – synthesizer prelude (8), synthesizers (10, 12)
- Bobby Chadwick – electric piano (8, 12)
- Ray Parker Jr. – guitars (4)
- Michael Sembello – guitars (4)
- Steve Cropper – electric guitars (6)
- Jeffrey Staton – electric guitars (8, 9), electric guitar solo (8, 12), acoustic guitars (10)
- Michael Staton – steel guitars (9), Elka String Ensemble (10, 12)
- Ray Brown – bass guitar (1)
- David Hungate – bass guitar (2, 3, 6, 8)
- Nathan Watts – bass guitar (4)
- David Shields – bass guitar (8)
- Leland Sklar – bass guitar (10), piccolo bass (10)
- Keith Hollar – bass guitar (12)
- Abraham Laboriel – bass guitar (12)
- Ed Shaughnessy – drums (1)
- Rick Shlosser – drums (2, 3, 6, 8, 9)
- Raymond Pounds – drums (4)
- Hal Atkinson – drums (8, 12)
- Paulinho da Costa – percussion (4)
- Tommy Vig – percussion (9)
- Tom Scott – saxophone solo (12), horn arrangements (12)
- Artie Butler – string arrangements and conductor (1), orchestra arrangements and conductor (7, 11)
- Marty Paich – string arrangements and conductor (3, 13)
- Gene Page – rhythm chart arrangements (4), string arrangements and conductor (8)

Backing vocals

- Michael McDonald (2, 8)
- Stephen Bishop (4, 9)
- Leah Kunkel (4)
- Jeffrey Staton (4, 8, 9)
- Michael Staton (4, 8)
- Natalie Cole (6)
- Chaka Khan (6)
- The James Lee Hoosett Choir (7)
- Art Garfunkel (10)

"The Whistling Bishettes" on "Vagabond from Heaven"

- Nancy Ames, Philip Ames, Michael Barackman, Dennis Bishop, Kathy Carey, Cameron Crowe, Kenny Farrell, Carrie Fisher, Mary Frampton, Richard Green, Trudy Green, John Landis, Mark Meyerson, Spencer Proffer, Michael J. Sheehy, James Lee Stanley, Jeffrey Staton, Michael Staton and Michael Whitney

== Production ==
- Stephen Bishop – producer
- Dee Robb – associate producer, engineer, mixing (1, 7, 11)
- Joe Robb – engineer
- Jerry Masters – mixing (2–6, 8–10, 12, 13)
- Joe Chiccarelli – assistant engineer
- Tony D'Amico – assistant engineer
- Steve Gursky – assistant engineer
- Steve Katz – assistant engineer
- Richard Leech – assistant engineer
- Kevin Ryan – assistant engineer
- George Tutko – assistant engineer
- Lee Herschberg – mastering at Warner Bros. Recording Studios (North Hollywood, California)
- Susan Conley – production assistant
- John Kosh – art direction, design
- David Alexander – photography
- Trudy Green – management

== Cover ==
According to Bishop, the cover features the model Sara Recor, a friend of Stevie Nicks and the subject of her song Sara, who went on to marry Mick Fleetwood.

== Certifications ==
Region	Certification	Certified units/sales
United States (RIAA)	Gold	500,000^{^}
^{^} Shipments figures based on certification alone.
