= Blue Guitars (Stephen Bishop album) =

Studio album by Stephen Bishop
- Released: 1996
- Genre: Pop
- Length: 54:28
- Label: Foundation
- Producer: Andrew Gold, Jeff Jones

Stephen Bishop chronology
On and On: The Hits of Stephen Bishop (1994)	Blue Guitars (1996)	An Introduction to Stephen Bishop (1997)

Professional ratings
Review scores
Source	Rating
The Virgin Encyclopedia of Popular Music	3/5 stars

Blue Guitars is a studio album by singer/songwriter Stephen Bishop. An album with the same title was released in Japan in 1994.

The Japanese release includes two tracks, "Yeh Yeh" and "Natalie", not found on the American version. The American release includes two tracks, "On Blonde Street" and "Wall Around Your Heart", not found on the Japanese version. These tracks were produced by Jeff Jones. All others were produced by Andrew Gold. Some track lengths are also substantially different between the two releases.

== Track listing ==
All songs written by Stephen Bishop, except where noted.

No.	Title	Writer(s)	Length
1.	"I Go Numb"	Bishop, Tom Snow, Andrew Gold	4:12
2.	"Dive into the Pool of Love"	Bishop, Snow	4:14
3.	"On Blonde Street"		5:02
4.	"When You Love Somebody"		4:33
5.	"(Just Like) Romeo and Juliet"	Freddie Gorman, Bob Hamilton	3:24
6.	"Wall Around Your Heart"		5:44
7.	"The King of Tonga"		3:58
8.	"Picasso Played a Blue Guitar"		4:33
9.	"Italian Rain"		4:29
10.	"Let Your Heart Remember"	Bishop, Jeff Jones	4:19
11.	"When Love Was Grand"		3:38
12.	"Separate Lives" (acoustic version)		4:24
13.	"R's Theme"		1:58

== Personnel ==
- Stephen Bishop – vocals, acoustic guitars
- Andrew Gold – keyboards, acoustic guitars, electric guitars, bass, drums, multi-instruments, backing vocals
- David Crosby – harmony vocals (2)
- Carnie Wilson – backing vocals
- Wendy Wilson – backing vocals
- Pia Zadora – backing vocals
- Michael McDonald – backing vocals (2)
