= Vinyl Films =

American film and television production company

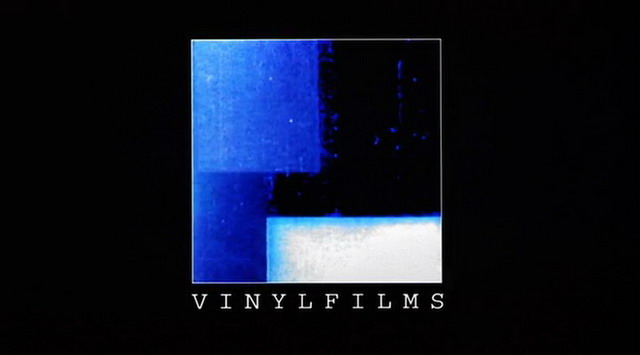
- Industry: Film; Television
- Founded: 1996
- Founder: Cameron Crowe
- Headquarters: Melrose Avenue, Los Angeles, California, United States
- Key people: Cameron Crowe
- Website: theuncool.com/vinyl

Vinyl Films is an American film and television production company founded by producer and director, Cameron Crowe, who launched the film and television production company in 1996. The logo consists of a box containing blue and white squares that intertwine.

== Films ==
- Jerry Maguire (1996)
- Almost Famous (2000)
- Vanilla Sky (2001)
- Elizabethtown (2005)
- Pearl Jam Twenty (2011)
- We Bought a Zoo (2011)
- Aloha (2015)
- David Crosby: Remember My Name (2019)
