= Elizabethtown (soundtrack) =

2005 film soundtrack album

Elizabethtown Soundtrack

Soundtrack album by various artists
- Released: September 13, 2005
- Genre: Rock, pop, alternative country
- Length: 58:47
- Label: RCA Records
- Producer: Cameron Crowe

The soundtrack for the film Elizabethtown, directed by Cameron Crowe, constitutes multiple volumes released by RCA Records between 2005-2006. The first volume of original songs from the movie, titled Elizabethtown: Songs from the Motion Picture, was released September 13, 2005. The physical CD release of this first volume remains in print at the time of writing, but is not as pictured here, featuring instead the red cover art seen on AllMusic, and does not include the last song "Plush" referenced by the track listing here. The original score, composed by rock musician Nancy Wilson, was released on October 14, 2005. The four-song extended play Songs for the Ride Home was released as a limited-time iTunes Exclusive on December 20, 2005. A full-length follow-up collection, titled Elizabethtown: Volume 2, was released on February 7, 2006, and replaced Songs for the Ride Home on iTunes

Overall, the albums featured original music by rock musician Nancy Wilson, as well as songs by Tom Petty, Elton John, Lindsey Buckingham, Ryan Adams, My Morning Jacket, Jeff Finlin, and other artists.

Professional ratings
Review scores
Source	Rating
Allmusic – Volume 1	link

== Track listing ==
=== Volume 1 ===
1. "60B (Etown Theme)" – Nancy Wilson
2. "It'll All Work Out" – Tom Petty and the Heartbreakers
3. "My Father's Gun" – Elton John
4. "io (This Time Around)" – Helen Stellar
5. "Come Pick Me Up" – Ryan Adams
6. "Where to Begin" – My Morning Jacket
7. "Long Ride Home" – Patty Griffin
8. "Sugar Blue" – Jeff Finlin
9. "Don't I Hold You" – Wheat
10. "Shut Us Down" – Lindsey Buckingham
11. "Let It Out (Let It All Hang Out)" – The Hombres
12. "Hard Times (Come Again No More)" – Eastmountainsouth
13. "Jesus Was a Cross Maker" – The Hollies
14. "Square One" – Tom Petty
15. "Same in Any Language" – I Nine
16. "Plush" – 13th Step

=== Songs for the Ride Home ===
Songs for the Ride Home

EP by various artists
- Released: December 20, 2005
- Genre: Rock, pop, alternative country
- Label: RCA Records
- Producer: Cameron Crowe

1. "Words" – Ryan Adams
2. "Jesus Was a Cross Maker" – Rachael Yamagata
3. "Oh Yeah" – Nancy Wilson
4. "Moon River" – Patty Griffin

=== Volume 2 ===
Elizabethtown Soundtrack Vol: 2

Soundtrack album by various artists
- Released: February 7, 2006
- Genre: Rock, pop, alternative country
- Label: RCA Records
- Producer: Cameron Crowe

Professional ratings
Review scores
Source	Rating
Allmusic – Volume 2	link

1. "Learning to Fly" – Tom Petty and the Heartbreakers
2. "English Girls Approximately" – Ryan Adams
3. "Jesus Was a Cross Maker" – Rachael Yamagata
4. "Funky Nassau" – The Beginning of the End
5. "Loro" – Pinback
6. "Moon River" – Patty Griffin
7. "Summerlong" – Kathleen Edwards
8. "...Passing By" – Ulrich Schnauss
9. "You Can't Hurry Love" – The Concretes
10. "River Road" – Nancy Wilson
11. "Same in Any Language" – My Morning Jacket
12. "What Are They Doing in Heaven Today" – Washington Phillips
13. "Words" – Ryan Adams
14. "Big Love" (Live) – Lindsey Buckingham
15. "I Can't Get Next to You" – The Temptations

=== Original score ===
Elizabethtown Original Score

Soundtrack album by Nancy Wilson
- Released: 14 October 2005
- Genre: Rock, pop, alternative country
- Label: RCA Records
- Producer: Nancy Wilson

1. "60B (Etown Theme)"
2. "Same in Any Lingo"
3. "Scruffy Busque"
4. "River Kiss"
5. "River Drive"
6. "Headstone"
7. "Grey Sky's Blue"
8. "Flame to Ashes"
9. "Zapata"
10. "Dirty Shirt"
11. "C Roll"
12. "Family Table"
13. "Drew's Theme"
14. "Telephone Waltz"
15. "California Baylor"
16. "River Road"
17. "Fiasco"
18. "Containing Magic"
19. "Bicycle Kid"
20. "Every Snowflake"
21. "Sun on a Rug"
