= TAT (band) =

English rock band

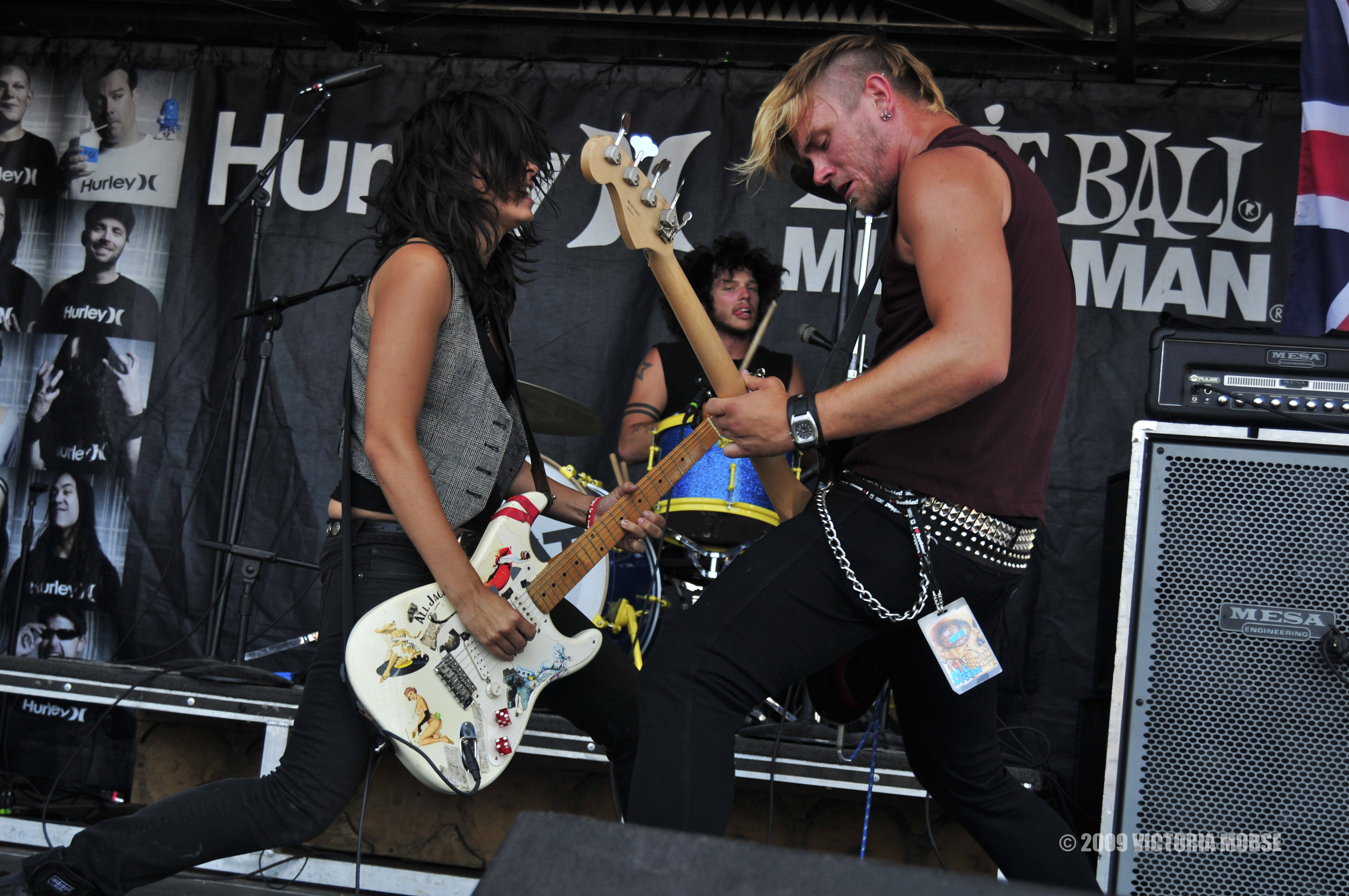
- TAT performing on Warped Tour in 2009

Background information
- Origin: London, England
- Genres: Punk rock, rock, alternative
- Years active: 2003–present
- Labels: Red Wagon Records, EX Records
- Members: Tatiana DeMaria
- Past members: Nick Kent; Jake Reed; Tim Vanderkuil; James Bailes; Damon Wilson; Robin Guy
- Website: Official website

TAT is an English rock/punk band hailing from London.

== History ==
=== Early years (2003–2005) ===
The band, originally a quartet, was founded in 2003 by Tatiana DeMaria. In 2004 they released their debut single, 'Peace Sex & Tea' which charted in the UK's top 50, followed by their 'Pessimist' EP, a live recording of part of their set from Reading Festival 2004, which entered the BBC's Official Rock Chart at number 18. Both Single/EP were released independently through EX Records in conjunction with the Extreme Sports Channel. As the band started making ripples, they earned a support slot with The Offspring and HorrorPops in Paris, where they were exposed to 13,000 people.

Throughout 2005, TAT experienced several lineup changes which eventually saw the band become a trio, with the inclusion of bassist Nick Kent and drummer Jake Reed. After more UK touring, they flew to Poland to join Coalition For Kids, a two-week stadium tour to raise money for terminally ill children.

=== CCS & USA debut (2006–2008) ===
2006 saw the release of their next single, "Champagne Cocaine & Strawberries", which they released and distributed themselves. During this period, Jake Reed briefly left the band and was replaced by former drummer Robin Guy until his return. For this reason, Robin can be seen in the promotional video for 'Champagne Cocaine & Strawberries'. It was later this year that the band embarked on the Vans Warped Tour for the first time, playing the second month of the travelling festival on the ShiraGirl stage.

In 2007, TAT toured the UK and Europe with such notable punk acts as NOFX and The Bouncing Souls (whom they met on Warped Tour '06) as well as Me First And The Gimme Gimmes, The Draft and The Loved Ones. In October, they spent three weeks in Atlanta, GA where they recorded the bulk of their debut album.

TAT released their album preview EP entitled This Is...TAT in 2008. They completed the Vans Warped Tour and embarked on several other North American/Canadian tours with Alice Cooper, Lagwagon and MxPx.

=== Soho Lights (2008–2010) ===
Soho Lights, the band's debut album, was released on 28 October 2008 through their own label, Red Wagon Records, with nationwide distribution across the USA via Sony's RED Distribution. However, the album was not initially released in the UK, which caused frustration for both the band and their home fans. The album later found a digital UK release through iTunes, but never in a physical format.

After a short break over the festive period and playing a one off homecoming show in London, The band returned to the US in February for a Californian tour with Pennywise and Authority Zero. Nick Kent was unable to attend the tour due to a wrist operation and was temporarily replaced by Nick Stagnaro of Good Guys In Black for all shows. In March and April, TAT embarked on their first solo American tour, and in the Summer they played the entire 2009 Warped Tour, performing on the Hurley stage. The band then toured with Alice Cooper that same summer for three weeks.

A fall tour with Social Distortion was scheduled and promoted; however, TAT later announced that due to unforeseen circumstances they would be unable to perform. In September, the band started writing material for their second full-length album. DeMaria also lent her vocals to Reel Big Fish's 2009 album of covers, Fame, Fortune, and Fornication, where she sang a duet with Aaron Barrett on Talk Dirty to Me.

=== Second album and future (2011–present) ===
In 2011, TAT announced that they were back in the studio recording their second up album and appeared on Warped Tour 2011 bringing some of their new material to the live set along with a handful of LA, NY and UK shows. During this time DeMaria wrote and produced several songs for the soundtrack of Blue Crush 2, the direct-to-DVD sequel of 2002's Blue Crush, which TAT performed along with a cover of the Allman Brothers' "Soulshine". In December 2011, the band self-released the EP Somewhere Between Heaven and Hell.

In 2015, TAT released a new song titled "Anxiety" and embarked on the 2015 Vans Warped Tour through the US and Canada for two months.

== Discography ==
=== Studio albums ===
- Soho Lights (2008, Red Wagon Records)

=== EPs ===
- Pessimist – Live from Another Wasted Summer (2004, Ex Records)
- Peace Sex & Tea (2004, Ex Records)
- 4 Track EP (2006, self-released)
- This Is...TAT (2008, self-released)
- TAT-Acoustic EP (2010, Acoustic versions of four songs from Soho Lights)
- Somewhere Between Heaven and Hell (2011, self-released)

==== Peace Sex & Tea ====
Peace Sex & Tea was the debut release for UK-based band TAT.

===== Track listing =====
1. "Peace Sex & Tea" – 4:00
2. "Bloodstain" – 2:49
3. "Live For Rock" – 2:34

===== Personnel =====
- Tatiana DeMaria – vocals, guitar
- Tim Vanderkuill (as Tim Vanderkill) – guitar
- Damon Wilson (as Damonski) – drums
- James Bailes (as Spreader) - bass

All tracks written by Tatiana DeMaria except "Bloodstain" written by DeMaria and Tim Vanderkill

=== Singles ===
- "Champagne Cocaine & Strawberries" (2006, self-released)
- "I Don't Want To (Love You)" (2009, Red Wagon Records)
