= Jesus Was a Cross Maker =

1971 song by Judee Sill

Single by Judee Sill

from the album Judee Sill
- Released: September 15, 1971
- Genre: Folk rock
- Length: 3:30
- Label: Asylum
- Songwriter: Judee Sill
- Producer: Graham Nash

"Jesus Was a Cross Maker" is a 1971 song by American singer-songwriter Judee Sill from her eponymous debut album. It has subsequently been recorded by the likes of Cass Elliot, The Hollies, Warren Zevon, and Linda Ronstadt.

== Composition ==
Months after completing the recording sessions for her debut album, Sill was touring as an opening act and reeling from the end of a “dramatic affair” with fellow songwriter JD Souther. She began composing "Jesus Was a Cross Maker" while reading the 1955 Nikos Kazantzakis novel The Last Temptation of Christ, in which Jesus is portrayed as a carpenter who builds wooden crosses for the Romans. “I was so excited when I was writin’ that song,” Sill said in 1972, “because it was not only the best thing I’d ever written, and I knew it, but it took the weight off my heart and turned it into somethin’ else, and I was able to forgive the guy for the horrible romantic bummer he'd put me on. And I gained a new kind of strength from it, from that combination of forgiveness and creation.”

In a 2014 interview, Souther recalled his first time hearing the song. “She came over to my house at about seven or eight in the morning,” he said. “Pounded on the door, woke me up, came in, sat on my bed, and said, ‘This is for you,’ very sourly. Then she played it for me.”

== Recording and release ==
The song was orchestrated by Don Bagley and Bob Harris and produced by Graham Nash, with a production designed for radio airplay. The last-minute addition of “Jesus Was a Cross Maker” to Sill's debut album necessitated the removal of two songs, “The Pearl” and “The Phoenix,” which later appeared on her 1973 album Heart Food.

== Other recordings ==
- Cass Elliot on her 1972 album Cass Elliot.
- The Hollies on their 1972 album Romany and on the 2006 soundtrack album Elizabethtown: Volume 1.
- Judie Tzuke on her 1991 album Left Hand Talking.
- Warren Zevon on his 1995 album Mutineer.
- Linda Ronstadt on her 1999 compilation album The Linda Ronstadt Box Set (as “Bandit & A Heart-Breaker”).
- Rachael Yamagata on the 2006 soundtrack album Elizabethtown: Volume 2.
- Frida Hyvönen on the 2009 tribute album Crayon Angel: A Tribute to the Music of Judee Sill.
- BRAHMAN on their 2013 album Chōkoku (超克).

== Legacy ==
The song received renewed attention after Cameron Crowe featured The Hollies’ cover version in his 2005 film Elizabethtown. Crowe has described the song as “the black-sheep stepbrother of ‘Bridge over Troubled Water.’”

The Frida Hyvönen cover closed the Letterkenny season 6 episode "Dyck's Slip Out."

The original was used to close the Minx season 1 episode 8 "Oh, you're the sun now? Giver of life?"

Cass Elliot's recording of the song is played over the end credits of the Outer Range season 1 finale, episode 8 “The West”.

The original was used as a recurring motif throughout multiple episodes of Dag.
