= Heart Food =

Studio album by Judee Sill
- Released: March 1973
- Genre: Folk; folk pop
- Length: 36:14
- Label: Asylum
- Producer: Judee Sill; Henry Lewy

Judee Sill chronology
Judee Sill (1971)	Heart Food (1973)	Dreams Come True (2005)

Professional ratings
Review scores
Source	Rating
AllMusic	3.5/5 stars
Christgau's Record Guide	B+
Creem	B+
Pitchfork	(8.8/10)

Heart Food is the second album by the American singer-songwriter Judee Sill, released by Asylum in March 1973 to critical acclaim but minimal sales. Sill wrote, arranged, and produced the album. As with her debut Judee Sill, it was reissued by Rhino Records in 2003, featuring new liner notes and extra demos and unreleased tracks.

== Songs ==
Some of the songs from Heart Food date back to the time of her debut album Judee Sill. "The Pearl" and "The Phoenix" (copyrighted in 1969) were originally recorded for the debut album in 1971 but were removed to make room for late inclusion "Jesus Was a Cross Maker". Instead, they were re-recorded for Heart Food. Sill had also been performing "The Vigilante" in 1971 when working as a support act.

Sill finished writing "The Kiss" around March 15, 1972, and "Down Where the Valleys Are Low" was also completed in early 1972. Songs like "The Kiss" reflect her fascination with hymnody and Christian imagery, while others, notably "Soldier of the Heart", feature fuller pop arrangements. The album is dedicated to Sill's then-boyfriend David Omer Bearden, who wrote the lyrics to the solo piano song "When the Bridegroom Comes". As with her debut, Sill's lyrics bear the hallmarks of her interest in the occult and Christian theology. The song "The Donor" features an ambitious and intricate choral arrangement built around hymnal chants of "Kyrie Eleison".

== Live ==
Sill continued to perform live with the release of Heart Food. She debuted "The Kiss" in a BBC session on March 23, 1972, saying it was written only seven or eight days before. She also played "Down Where the Valleys Are Low" at this session, aired on April 1, 1972. Sill also performed further BBC sessions in 1972 and 1973, including a TV concert in April 1972, a Radio 1 session on February 14, 1973, where she played six songs from Heart Food, and two sessions for the BBC TV show Old Grey Whistle Test; her performance of "The Kiss" at the 1973 session is available on DVD.

== Track listing ==
All tracks composed by Judee Sill; except lyrics on "When the Bridegroom Comes" by David Omer Bearden.

Side one

1. "There's a Rugged Road" – 3:44
2. "The Kiss" – 4:36
3. "The Pearl" – 1:55
4. "Down Where the Valleys Are Low" – 3:52
5. "The Vigilante" – 3:50

Side two

1. "Soldier of the Heart" – 3:34
2. "The Phoenix" – 2:37
3. "When the Bridegroom Comes" – 4:14
4. "The Donor" – 7:55
5. "Jig" (hidden track) – 1:07

== Personnel ==
- Judee Sill – guitar, keyboards, vocals, music arrangement
- Chris Ethridge – bass
- Bill Plummer – bass
- Jim Gordon – drums
- Emil Richards – percussion
- Bobbye Hall – percussion
- Doug Dillard – banjo
- Buddy Emmons – pedal steel guitar
- Lynn Blessing – vibraphone
- Louie Shelton – guitar
- Spooner Oldham – keyboards
- Gene Cipriano – saxophone
- Richard Perissi – French horn
- Vincent DeRosa – French horn
- Jesse Ehrlich – cello
- Ray Kelley – cello
- Assa Drori – violin
- Ronald Folsom – violin
- Harris Goldman – violin
- William Kurasch – violin
- Leonard Malarsky – violin
- Ralph Schaeffer – violin
- Tibor Zelig – violin
- David Schwartz – viola
- Carolyn Willis – vocals
- Oma Drake – vocals
- Gloria Jones – vocals
- Henry Lewy – producer, audio engineer

== Versions ==
"The Kiss" has been covered by Matt Alber on his 2011 album Constant Crows, by Fleet Foxes on their 2024 live album Live on Boston Harbor, by Neil Cavanagh on his 2008 album Short Flight to a Distant Star, and by Bonnie 'Prince' Billy on his 2004 CD single "No More Workhorse Blues".

Shawn Colvin covered "There's a Rugged Road" on her 1994 album Cover Girl, and it was sung by a character in the 2010 film Greenberg, directed by Noah Baumbach.

Jane Siberry contributed vocals to a cover of "The Kiss" for Ghostland's album Interview with the Angel. This version was also released on Siberry's 2001 compilation, City.

Jackie Leven, under the pseudonym Sir Vincent Lone, covered "When the Bridegroom Comes" on his 2007 album When the Bridegroom Comes (Songs for Women).
