= Careless (album) =

Studio album by Stephen Bishop
- Released: October 1976
- Studios: ABC Recording Studios (Los Angeles, California); A&M Studios (Hollywood, California)
- Genres: Pop, soft rock
- Length: 39:17
- Labels: ABC, Los Angeles, California
- Producers: Henry Lewy; Stephen Bishop

Stephen Bishop chronology
Careless (1976)	Bish (1978)

Professional ratings
Review scores
Source	Rating
AllMusic	4/5 stars
Christgau's Record Guide	C+
The Rolling Stone Record Guide	3/5 stars
The Virgin Encyclopedia Of Popular Music	3/5 stars

Careless is the debut album by singer/songwriter Stephen Bishop. It includes two hit singles: "On and On", which peaked at No. 11 on the Billboard singles chart, and "Save It for a Rainy Day" which made No. 22. The album itself rose to No. 34 on the Billboard albums chart. Notable contributors to the album include Eric Clapton, Art Garfunkel and Chaka Khan.

== Track listing ==
All songs written by Stephen Bishop.

No.	Title	Length
1.	"On and On"	3:00
2.	"Never Letting Go"	3:48
3.	"Careless"	3:45
4.	"Sinking in an Ocean of Tears"	3:08
5.	"Madge"	4:03
6.	"Every Minute"	3:58
7.	"Little Italy"	3:27
8.	"One More Night"	4:02
9.	"Guitar Interlude"	0:35
10.	"Save It for a Rainy Day"	3:10
11.	"Rock and Roll Slave"	3:38
12.	"The Same Old Tears on a New Background"	2:40

== Personnel ==
=== Musicians ===
- Stephen Bishop – vocals (1–8, 10–12), backing vocals (1, 11), acoustic guitars (1–4, 6–8, 10, 11), trombone (3), guitar (5, 9, 12)
- John Barlow Jarvis – electric piano (1, 10), acoustic piano (2–4, 6, 8, 10)
- Alan Lindgren – synthesizers (4, 8)
- Steve Paietta – accordion (7)
- Larry Knechtel – electric piano (11), organ (11)
- Andrew Gold – electric guitars (1, 6)
- Lee Ritenour – acoustic guitars (2, 11)
- Eric Clapton – electric slide guitar (4), electric guitar solo (10)
- Jay Graydon – electric guitars (4), acoustic guitars (6)
- Larry Carlton – acoustic guitars (7)
- Michael Staton – steel guitar (1)
- Tommy Tedesco – mandolin (7)
- Jeffrey Staton – electric guitars (10), bass guitar (10)
- Mac Cridlin – bass guitar (1, 3, 4)
- Reinie Press – bass guitar (2, 8, 11)
- Max Bennett – bass guitar (6, 7)
- Larry Brown – drums (1, 3, 4)
- Jim Gordon – drums (2, 8, 11)
- John Guerin – drums (6, 7)
- Russ Kunkel – drums (10)
- Victor Feldman – marimba (1), percussion (1, 7), vibraphone (1, 7)
- Ray Pizzi – saxophone solo (4)
- Ian Freebairn-Smith – string arrangements (2, 7), string conductor (2), horn arrangements (4, 10), woodwind arrangements (7)
- Lee Holdridge – string arrangements and conductor (3, 5, 8)
- Chaka Khan – vocals (2, 7, 10), backing vocals (2)
- Art Garfunkel – vocals (3, 6), backing vocals (11)
- Leah Kunkel – backing vocals (11)

=== Production ===
- Stephen Bishop – producer
- Henry Lewy – producer, engineer
- Leslie Ann Jones – assistant engineer
- Helen Silvani – assistant engineer
- Bernie Grundman – mastering at A&M Studios
- Rod Dyer – album design
- Gary Heery – cover and back photography, inside photography
- Patti Boyd Harrison – inside photography
- Charles Villiers – inside photography
- Trudy Green – management

== Charts ==
Chart (1977)	Peak position
Canada Top Albums/CDs (RPM)	54
US Billboard 200	34
