= Save It for a Rainy Day (Stephen Bishop song) =

Single by Stephen Bishop

from the album Careless
- B-side: "Careless"
- Released: December 1976
- Recorded: 1976
- Genre: Soft rock
- Length: 3:10
- Label: ABC
- Songwriter: Stephen Bishop
- Producers: Henry Lewy, Stephen Bishop

Stephen Bishop singles chronology
"Save It for a Rainy Day" (1976)	"On and On" (1977)

"Save It for a Rainy Day" is a song by American singer/songwriter Stephen Bishop. The song was the first of two hit singles from his debut album, Careless. It features a guitar solo by Eric Clapton and Chaka Khan on backing vocals toward the close of the song.

"Save It for a Rainy Day" peaked at number 22 on the U.S. Billboard Hot 100 and number 21 on the Cash Box Top 100. In Canada, the song peaked at number 20.

The song was a bigger Adult Contemporary hit, peaking at number six in the U.S. and number eight in Canada.

== Chart performance ==
=== Weekly charts ===
Chart (1976–1977)	Peak position
U.S. Billboard Hot 100	22
U.S. Billboard Adult Contemporary	6
U.S. Cashbox Top 100	21
Canadian RPM Top Singles	20
Canadian RPM Adult Contemporary	8

=== Year-end charts ===
Chart (1977)	Rank
Canada	158
U.S. Adult Contemporary (Billboard)	49

== Personnel ==
- Stephen Bishop – lead vocals, acoustic guitar
- John Barlow Jarvis – acoustic piano, electric piano
- Eric Clapton – rhythm electric guitar, lead guitar solo
- Jeff Staton Jones – rhythm electric guitar, bass
- Russ Kunkel – drums
- Ian Freebairn-Smith – horn arrangements
- Chaka Khan – backing vocals
