= Stephen Bishop (singer) =

American singer-songwriter, guitarist and actor (born 1951)

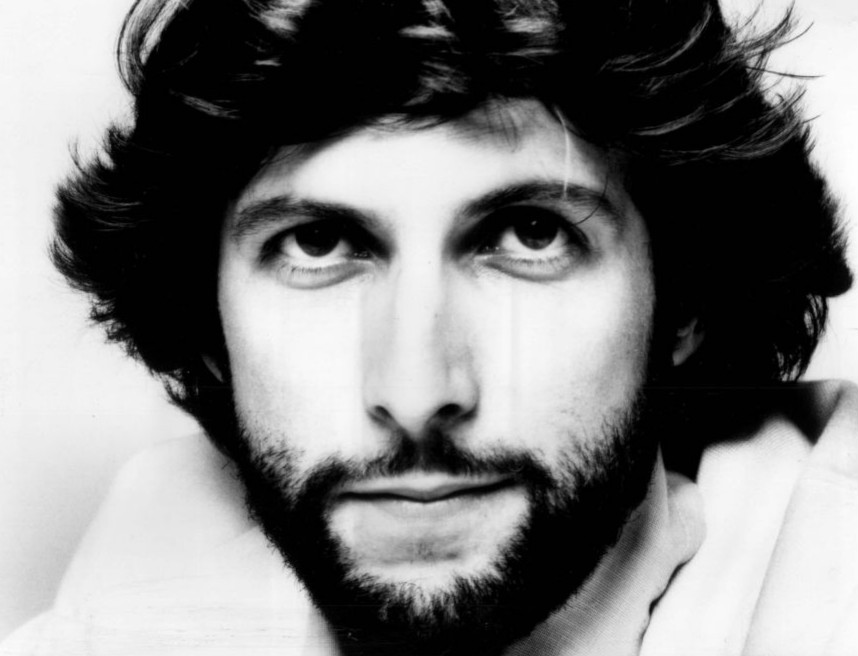
- Bishop in 1977

Background information
- Born: Earl Stephen Bishop; November 14, 1951 (age 75); San Diego, California, U.S.
- Genre: Soft rock
- Occupations: Singer-songwriter
- Instruments: Vocals, guitar
- Years active: 1967–2025
- Labels: ABC; Warner Bros.; MCA
- Spouse: Liz Kamlet (m. 2021)
- Website: stephenbishop.com

Earl Stephen Bishop (born November 14, 1951) is an American singer-songwriter, guitarist, and actor. His biggest hits include "On and On", "It Might Be You", and "Save It for a Rainy Day". He has also written songs for many other artists, such as Barbra Streisand, Phil Collins, and Art Garfunkel. He has contributed music and acted in films including National Lampoon's Animal House.

== Personal life ==
Earl Stephen Bishop was born and raised in San Diego, California. He attended Will C. Crawford High School. Originally a clarinetist, he persuaded his brother to buy him a guitar after seeing the Beatles perform on The Ed Sullivan Show.

In August 2025, he announced his retirement following the release of his final album, THIMK, explaining his desire to spend more time with his child. In 2026, however, he began performing again and has American and international concert dates extending into 2027.

== Career ==
=== Music ===
In 1967, he formed his first group, the Weeds, a British Invasion-style band. After the Weeds folded, Bishop moved to Los Angeles in search of a solo recording contract. During a lean eight-year period, where he was rejected "by nearly every label and producer". He continued to write songs, eventually landing a $50-a-week job with a publishing house.

Bishop's break came when a friend, Leah Kunkel, gave Art Garfunkel one of Bishop's demo tapes. Garfunkel chose two of his songs, "Looking for the Right One" and "The Same Old Tears on a New Background", to record for his platinum album Breakaway. Via Garfunkel's patronage, Bishop finally secured a recording contract with ABC Records in 1976. His first album, Careless, included two of his biggest hits. The first single released, "Save It for a Rainy Day", introduced Bishop to the listening public and was number 22 on the Billboard singles chart. The next single, Bishop's highest charting to date, "On and On", peaked at No. 11. The album itself rose to number 34 on the Billboard albums chart. Eric Clapton, Garfunkel, and Chaka Khan all contributed their talents to the album.

Careless went gold as did Bishop's next album, Bish, released in 1978. Bish included one single, "Everybody Needs Love", which made it to number 32. The album has a smooth classic called "A Fool At Heart" which features Chaka Khan and Natalie Cole on background vocals. His third album, Red Cab to Manhattan, released in 1980, failed to chart and was the last released in North America for nine years.

Bishop has written and performed music for many feature films. In 1978, he contributed the original songs "Dream Girl" and the titular theme to National Lampoon's Animal House, both of which he sang in falsetto. In 1980, he contributed backing vocals to "This Must Be Love", from Phil Collins' debut solo album Face Value. Bishop's next hit, charting at number 25 in 1982, was "It Might Be You", the theme from the movie Tootsie, unusual in that it was not penned by Bishop. Written by Dave Grusin, Alan Bergman, and Marilyn Bergman, it was nominated for an Academy Award for Best Original Song.

Bishop's composition "Separate Lives", sung by Phil Collins and Marilyn Martin, from the 1985 movie White Nights, was nominated for an Academy Award for Best Original Song. It lost to "Say You, Say Me" from the same film. Bishop wrote the song about his breakup with actress Karen Allen, who also appeared in Animal House. He said: "I write much better when I'm heartbroken and sad or melancholy." Other film music includes "Somewhere in Between" (written and performed) from The China Syndrome (1979), "Your Precious Love" (performed with Yvonne Elliman) from Roadie (1980), "If Love Takes You Away" (written and performed) from Summer Lovers (1982), "Unfaithfully Yours (One Love)" which was written and performed from Unfaithfully Yours (1984), "Something New in My Life" (performed) from Micki & Maude (1984), "The Heart Is So Willing" (performed) from The Money Pit (1986), "All I Want" (performed) from All I Want for Christmas (1991), and "You Can Do Anything" (written and performed by Bishop and Jeff Jones) from Barney's Great Adventure (1998). In addition, the original version of "Walkin' on Air" (written and performed by Bishop) was featured in the 1986 film The Boy Who Could Fly.

In 1989, Bishop released the album Bowling in Paris with Phil Collins (the co-producer on some of the songs), Eric Clapton, and Sting contributing. The album included a revamped version of "Walkin' on Air", this time featuring drumming, production, and additional vocals from Collins. The version became a No. 13 hit on the Adult Contemporary chart. In 1987, the Norwegian swing/pop duo Bobbysocks! had recorded their own version of "Walking on Air" (as "Walkin' on Air") as the title track to their album Walkin' on Air. One of Bishop's best vocal performances was the song "(You'll Always Be) My Heart And Soul" on the soundtrack of the 1993 movie Heart And Souls.

Bishop released his 20th and final album in August 2025. The album, titled THIMK, features Art Garfunkel and Leah Kunkel.

Eric Clapton, in his autobiography, mentions Bishop as being one of his favorite singer-songwriters.

=== Acting ===
Bishop has appeared in several motion pictures as a "charming" character including four directed by John Landis. He had a cameo role, billed as "Charming Guy", in The Kentucky Fried Movie (1977); he appeared as a hustler in the infamous "Catholic High School Girls in Trouble" segment. In addition to singing the theme song off-screen, Bishop had a cameo appearance in National Lampoon's Animal House in 1978 (the aspiring folk singer billed as "Charming Guy with Guitar" who sang "The Riddle Song"). Charming Guy's guitar was smashed against a staircase wall at the Delta Tau Chi house by John "Bluto" Blutarsky (John Belushi). The scene was filmed twice and Bishop had the second smashed guitar signed by the cast and framed.

He appeared in The Blues Brothers (1980), billed as "Charming Trooper", who breaks his watch during a mall chase. He appeared very briefly in Twilight Zone: The Movie (1983), billed as "Charming G.I.", in the Vietnam War scene. Bishop appeared, as "Blue London", in Henry Jaglom's Someone to Love (1987).

== Discography ==
=== Albums ===
- Careless (1976)
- Bish (1978)
- Red Cab to Manhattan (1980)
- Sleeping with Girls (1985; Asia only)
- Bowling in Paris (1989; re-released in 2015 with different sequencing and cover)
- Blue Guitars (1996; released in 1994 in Japan with different tracks and cover)
- Happy Bishmas (2002; re-released in 2003 with different cover)
- Yardwork (2002; released in Japan with different cover)
- The Demo Album 1 (2003)
- The Demo Album 2 (2003)
- Fear of Massage: Demo 3 (2003)
- Stephen Bishop Live at Duo Music Exchange (2006; Japan only)
- America & Friends: Live at the Ventura Theater (2007; Japan only)
- Saudade (2007; Target-only release. Re-released worldwide as Romance in Rio)
- Romance in Rio (2008)
- Be Here Then (2014)
- Stephen Bishop Live (2014; also issued 2015 as The '70s: Stephen Bishop with series cover)
- Blueprint (2016)
- We'll Talk About It Later in the Car (2019)
- Rock Little Reindeer (2019)
- THIMK (2025)

=== Collections ===
- Best of Bish (1988)
- On and On: The Hits of Stephen Bishop (1994)
- An Introduction to Stephen Bishop (1997)
- Back to Back (1999; split title with Michael Johnson)
- The Millennium Collection (2002)

=== Singles ===
Year	Single	Chart Positions					
Year	Single	US	AC	CAN	CAN AC	NZ	UK
1977	"Save It for a Rainy Day"	22	6	20	8	—	—
1977	"On and On"	11	2	6	3	29	—
1977	"Never Letting Go"	—	—	—	—	—	—
1978	"Everybody Needs Love"	32	5	—	—	—	—
1978	"Animal House"	73	—	—	—	—	—
1978	"Looking for the Right One"	—	—	—	—	—	—
1980	"Your Precious Love" (with Yvonne Elliman)	—	—	—	—	—	—
1980	"Send a Little Love My Way"	—	31	—	—	—	—
1982	"If Love Takes You Away"	—	22	—	—	—	—
1983	"It Might Be You"	25	1	16	1		99
1984	"One Love (Unfaithfully Yours)"	87	4	—	—	—	—
1986	"The Heart Is So Willing"	—	31	—	—	—	—
1987	"Something New in My Life"	—	—	—	—	—	—
1989	"Walking on Air"	—	13	—	—	—	—
1990	"Mr. Heartbreak"	—	42	—	—	—	—
1991	"All I Want"	—	—	—	—	—	—
