= Judee Sill (album) =

Studio album by Judee Sill
- Released: September 15, 1971
- Genres: Folk; folk pop
- Length: 32:55
- Label: Asylum
- Producers: Henry Lewy; John Beck; Jim Pons; Graham Nash

Judee Sill chronology
Judee Sill (1971)	Heart Food (1973)

Professional ratings
Review scores
Source	Rating
AllMusic	4/5 stars
Christgau's Record Guide	B
Pitchfork	8.7/10

Judee Sill is the debut studio album by American singer-songwriter Judee Sill. Released on September 15, 1971, it was the first album on David Geffen's Asylum label. Backing musicians include John Beck and Jim Pons from the Leaves. While the majority of the album was produced by Henry Lewy, Graham Nash handled the duties for the single "Jesus Was a Cross Maker", with his production designed to aim for radio airplay.

== Songs ==
The songs that appear on Judee Sill were mostly composed in 1969–71. In 1969, Sill was hired by the Turtles to write songs for $35 a week for their publishing company, Blimp Music. The earliest of these are "Lady-O", which was recorded by the band, "Crayon Angels", "My Man on Love", "Lopin' Along Thru the Cosmos", "Enchanted Sky Machines", and "Abracadabra".

The latest additions to the album were "The Archetypal Man", "Ridge Rider", and the single "Jesus Was a Cross Maker". Originally, two other new songs, "The Pearl" and "The Phoenix", were slated for inclusion, but were removed from the track list to make room for "Jesus Was a Cross Maker". They were re-recorded and appeared on Sill's second album, Heart Food, in 1973.

Musically, the songs are delivered in an acoustic style on guitar and, for "Jesus Was a Cross Maker" and "Enchanted Sky Machines", piano. The songs, after work by Sill and Lewy, feature elements of pop, folk, country, and gospel, but also strong classical influences. Two of Sill's biggest influences were Bach and Ray Charles. Lyrically, Sill's songs follow a theme of finding redemption.

== Live ==
Sill began touring as an opening act in late 1970, a year before the release of Judee Sill. Her first major tour was with Crosby & Nash, and she also opened for Cat Stevens, Gordon Lightfoot and Tom Paxton. A full opening-act performance, recorded on October 3, 1971, in Boston in support of Crosby & Nash, appears on the Rhino reissue of Judee Sill. The set was recorded two days after the release of the "Jesus was a Cross Maker" single.

Sill did not enjoy working as a support act. She told NME in April 1972: "At the start it was hell. As I walked on stage I used to think, "Oh God I'd rather die than do this. I'd rather stick a knife in my heart than go out and say, "Nice to be here!" Unfortunately, sometimes I've played with rock groups which is – urrrrrgh – terrible, ridiculous in fact. If somebody is ready to hear rock and roll they're ready to have a certain part of their mind or body stimulated. It's asking too much of anybody to suddenly switch round and have another part of them stimulated by something else.

== Track listing ==
All tracks arranged and composed by Judee Sill.

Side one

1. "Crayon Angels" – 2:35
2. "The Phantom Cowboy" – 1:40
3. "The Archetypal Man" – 3:35
4. "The Lamb Ran Away with the Crown" – 3:10
5. "Lady-O" – 3:10
6. "Jesus Was a Cross Maker" – 3:20

Side two

1. "Ridge Rider" – 4:28
2. "My Man on Love" – 3:23
3. "Lopin' Along Thru the Cosmos" – 3:00
4. "Enchanted Sky Machines" – 2:40
5. "Abracadabra" – 1:54

== Personnel ==
- Judee Sill – guitar, piano and vocals
- Clydie King, Rita Coolidge, Venetta Fields – background vocals
- Don Bagley, Bob Harris – orchestration
- David Crosby – guitar
- Graham Nash – organ and production on "Jesus Was a Cross Maker"

Technical personnel

- Henry Lewy, John Beck, Jim Pons – production
- Graham Nash – production on "Jesus Was a Cross Maker"
- Larry Cox – engineering on "Jesus Was a Cross Maker"
- Gary Burden – art direction, design
- Andy Zax – reissue production
