= Soho Lights =

Studio album by TAT
- Released: October 28, 2008
- Genre: Rock, Punk rock
- Length: 46:06; 51:52 (w/ bonus tracks)
- Label: Red Wagon
- Producer: Tatiana DeMaria, Dean Dichoso, Russ-T Cobb

TAT chronology
This Is...TAT (2008)	Soho Lights (2008)

Soho Lights is the debut album by UK-based band TAT. The album was released on October 28, 2008.

== Track listing ==
1. "Road To Paradise" – 3:08
2. "Sympathetic Lies" – 3:42
3. "Pessimist" – 3:27
4. "Stay Up" – 3:53
5. "I Don't Want To (Love You)" – 3:25
6. "Everything I Want" – 3:18
7. "Here's To You" – 3:29
8. "Diamond Child" – 3:03
9. "Taking It All" – 3:14
10. "Sandra Dee" – 3:52
11. "Take You Home" – 2:50
12. "You Hero" – 3:05
13. "Live For Rock" – 2:40

Bonus Tracks

14. "Champagne, Cocaine & Strawberries" – 2:55
15. "Bloodstain" – 2:51

== Personnel ==
- Tatiana DeMaria – vocals, guitar
- Nick Kent – bass, vocals
- Jake Reed – drums, vocals

== Information ==
All Tracks written by Tatiana DeMaria except:

- 8 written by Tatiana DeMaria and Jake Reed
- 2 written by Tatiana DeMaria and Paddy Jordan
- 6, 9 & 11 written by Tatiana DeMaria and Johnny Andrews
- 7 written by Tatiana DeMaria and Jeff Franzel
