= Pessimist – Live from Another Wasted Summer =

Pessimist - Live From Another Wasted Summer

EP by TAT
- Released: 2004 (Digitally released July 5th 2006)
- Genre: Rock, Punk rock
- Length: 10:13
- Label: EX Records
- Producer: Tatiana DeMaria

TAT chronology
4 Track EP (2006)	Pessimist - Live From Another Wasted Summer (2004)	This Is...TAT (2006)

Pessimist - Live From Another Wasted Summer, listed as Pessimist (live) - EP on iTunes, is a live single from the band TAT. These are the only publicly known live recordings of the band (so far). A digital download is available on iTunes.

== Track listing ==
1. "Pessimist" – 4:13
2. "Bloodstain" – 2:58
3. "Happiness" – 3:02

== Personnel ==
- Tatiana DeMaria – vocals, guitar
- Tim Vanderkuil (as Time Vanderkill) - guitar, vocals
- James Bailes (as Spreader) – bass
- Robin Guy - drums (Tracks 1+2)
- Dave Ruffy - drums (Track 3)

== Information ==
All Tracks written by Tatiana DeMaria except:

- Bloodstain written by Tatiana DeMaria and Tim Vanderkill
