= It Might Be You =

- Side A of the US single

Single by Stephen Bishop

from the album Tootsie (Original Motion Picture Soundtrack)
- B-side: "Metamorphosis Blues" (It Might Be You)
- Released: January 1983
- Genre: Soft rock
- Length: 4:17
- Label: Warner Bros.
- Songwriters: Dave Grusin; Alan & Marilyn Bergman
- Producer: Dave Grusin

Stephen Bishop singles chronology
"Animal House" (1978)	"It Might Be You" (1983)	"Unfaithfully Yours (One Love)" (1984)

Music video
- Listen to "It Might Be You" (official music video) on YouTube

"It Might Be You" is a song with music written by Dave Grusin and lyrics written by Alan & Marilyn Bergman. It was performed by singer-songwriter Stephen Bishop in the 1982 film Tootsie, starring Dustin Hoffman and Jessica Lange. The song was nominated for an Academy Award for Best Original Song in 1983.

Bishop's recording peaked at No. 25 on the Billboard Hot 100 chart on May 7, 1983 and spent eight weeks in the top 40, becoming his final top 40 song to date. It also held two weeks at No. 1 on the U.S. Adult Contemporary chart in April the same year.

== Chart performance ==
=== Weekly charts ===
Chart (1983)	Peak position
Canada (The Record)	15
Canadian RPM Top Singles	16
Canadian RPM Adult Contemporary	1
Ireland	19
New Zealand	29
UK Singles Chart	99
U.S. Billboard Hot 100	25
U.S. Billboard Adult Contemporary	1
U.S. Cashbox Top 100	19

=== Year-end charts ===
Chart (1983)	Rank
U.S. Billboard Hot 100	95

== Personnel ==
- Stephen Bishop - vocals
- Dave Grusin – electric piano, acoustic piano
- George Doering, Paul Jackson Jr., Mitch Holder - guitar
- Abraham Laboriel - bass
- Ian Underwood - synthesizer
- Carlos Vega - drums
- Steve Foreman - percussion
- Becky Porter, Billy Phedford, Marva Holcolm, Paulette Brown - backing vocals

== Notable cover versions ==
- In 1991, Patti Austin included a cover on her Live album.
- In 1995, Roberta Flack recorded the song for use in the Forest Whitaker-directed film Waiting to Exhale. The song appears in the film, but not on the film's soundtrack album and appearing instead on her own album, Roberta.
- Filipino singer Erik Santos also covered the song as a duet with Marinel Santos in 2003 and it was used as the title theme song of the Philippine drama series, It Might Be You.
- In 2013, the song appeared over the closing credits of the film The Pretty One, covered by KÁRYYN and Julian Wass. The Pretty One shares with Tootsie the theme of a person assuming a different identity.
- In October 2015, Filipino singer and actor Michael Pangilinan covered the song and it was used as the theme song of the film Everyday I Love You.

== See also ==
- List of Billboard Adult Contemporary number ones of 1983
