= Henry Lewy =

German-born American sound engineer and record producer (1926–2006)

Henry Lewy (May 31, 1926 – April 8, 2006), born Heinz Lewy, was a German-born American sound engineer and record producer, who was best known for his work on many critically acclaimed and successful rock and folk albums of the 1970s and 1980s, particularly those by Joni Mitchell, Leonard Cohen, Neil Young, Crosby, Stills and Nash, Joan Baez, Stephen Bishop, and Judee Sill.

== Biography ==
Lewy was born to a Jewish family in Magdeburg, Germany, where his father owned a farm machinery business. The family left Germany in 1939, traveling to England and Canada, before settling at first in Savannah, Georgia, and then in Los Angeles, California. Henry Lewy graduated from Hollywood High School in 1945 and served in the US Army before working in radio stations in San Diego, Las Vegas and Los Angeles as an audio engineer and announcer.

During the 1950s he studied engineering and travelled in South America, joining a circus as an engineer for a time before returning to work at the Electrovox Studios in Los Angeles. He then moved to Liberty Records, where he worked with Ross Bagdasarian on records by The Chipmunks. He also worked at Gold Star Studios with Jackie DeShannon and Leon Russell, and with Bones Howe on records by The Mamas and the Papas and Johnny Rivers.

In 1967 he moved to A&M Records, where he worked on hit records by Sérgio Mendes and Boyce and Hart. While working with Crosby, Stills and Nash, he was introduced by Crosby to Joni Mitchell, thus beginning a long collaboration with the singer-songwriter. Lewy collaborated with Mitchell on the engineering and production of Clouds, Ladies of the Canyon, Blue, Court and Spark, The Hissing of Summer Lawns, Hejira, Wild Things Run Fast, and other albums, from the 1960s to the 1980s, including Careless, the debut album by Stephen Bishop which Lewy co-produced. He also worked in a similar capacity with Neil Young (Harvest, 1972), Judee Sill (Heart Food, 1973), Joan Baez (Gracias a la Vida, 1974), Hoyt Axton (Southbound, 1975), Bill Hughes (Dream Master, 1979), Leonard Cohen (Recent Songs, 1979), Minnie Riperton (Minnie, 1979), Joan Armatrading (How Cruel,1979), Van Morrison (Common One, 1980), The Long Ryders (Native Sons, 1984) and Jennifer Warnes (Famous Blue Raincoat, 1986).

Lewy retired in the late 1980s, and in later years lived in Prescott, Arizona. He died there in 2006 at the age of 79, after a period of declining health which included a stroke and heart surgery.
