= Crosby, Stills & Nash 1982 and 1983 tours =

1982–83 concert tours by Crosby, Stills & Nash

CSN 1982 and 1983 tours
- Tour by Crosby, Stills & Nash
- Poster for the concert in Uniondale, New York
- Start date: 5 June 1982
- End date: 12 July 1983
- Legs: 3
- No. of shows: 79

Crosby, Stills & Nash concert chronology
- CSN 1978 Tour; CSN 1982 and 1983 tours; CSN 1984 Tour

The Crosby, Stills & Nash 1982 and 1983 concert tours were two tours that covered North America, and Europe. They were in support of the 1982 album Daylight Again and the 1983 live album Allies.

== History ==
This was Crosby, Still & Nash's first tour in four years, supporting their album Daylight Again. This was also the first time CSN toured Europe, since two dates back in 1970.

== Personnel ==
- David Crosby – vocals, guitars
- Stephen Stills – vocals, guitars, keyboards
- Graham Nash – vocals, guitars, organ
- Michael Sturgis – guitar
- Mike Finnigan – keyboards
- Efrain Toro – percussion
- George "Chocolate" Perry – bass (1982 tour)
- Joe Vitale – drums (1982 tour)
- Kim Bullard – keyboards (1983 tour)
- James Newton Howard – keyboards (1982 tour)
- Kenny Passarelli – bass (1983 tour)
- Rick Jaeger – drums (1983 tour)

== Setlist ==
A typical set list for the 1982 tour included the following, although there were substitutions, variations and order switches throughout the tour.

1. "Love the One You're With" (Stills)
2. "Turn Your Back on Love" (Stills, Nash)
3. "The Lee Shore" (Crosby)
4. "Just a Song Before I Go" (Nash)
5. "Chicago" (Nash)
6. "Barrel of Pain (Half-Life)" (Nash)
7. "To the Last Whale..." (Crosby, Nash)
8. "Southern Cross" (Stills)
9. "See the Changes" (Stills)
10. "Long Time Gone" (Crosby)
11. "You Don't Have to Cry" (Stills)
12. "Darkstar" (Stills)
13. "Blackbird" (Lennon/McCartney)
14. "Wasted on the Way" (Nash)
15. "Delta" (Crosby)
16. "Guinevere" (Crosby)
17. "Wooden Ships" (Crosby, Stills, Kantner)
18. "Suite: Judy Blues Eyes" (Stills)
19. "Cathedral" (Nash)
20. "For What It's Worth" (Stills)
21. "Carry On" (Stills)
22. "Teach Your Children" (Nash)

== 1982 tour dates ==
Tours
Date	City	Country	Venue	Attendance	Gross	Ref
Summer leg
5 June 1982	Pasadena	United States	Rose Bowl ("Peace Sunday Committee Benefit")	66,224	$731,057	
31 July 1982	Hartford	United States	Hartford Civic Center	15,906/15,906	$175,831	
1 August 1982	Portland, Maine	United States	Cumberland County Civic Center	9,174/9,174	$113,300	
2 August 1982	Providence	United States	Providence Civic Center	13,149/13,149	$145,542	
5 August 1982	Columbia	United States	Merriweather Post Pavilion			
7 August 1982	Hampton	United States	Hampton Coliseum			
9 August 1982	Pittsburgh	United States	Civic Arena	17,000/17,000	$200,759	
10 August 1982	Hershey	United States	Hersheypark Stadium	14,750/20,000	$170,198	
11 August 1982	Philadelphia	United States	The Spectrum	15,576,17,200	$171,167	
13 August 1982	East Rutherford	United States	Meadowlands Arena	20,223/20,223	$237,618	
14 August 1982	Uniondale	United States	Nassau Coliseum	16,732	$212,062	
16 August 1982	Clarkston	United States	Pine Knob Music Center			
17 August 1982	Clarkston	United States	Pine Knob Music Center			
18 August 1982	Charleston	United States	Charleston Civic Center			
20 August 1982	Indianapolis	United States	Market Square Arena	11,382/14,000	$133,750	
21 August 1982	Hoffman Estates	United States	Poplar Creek Music Theatre			
22 August 1982	Milwaukee	United States	Lakefront Arena			
24 August 1982	St. Louis	United States	Checkerdome	10,654/12,615	$128,387	
25 August 1982	Kansas City	United States	Kemper Arena	8,120/9,420	$99,350	
26 August 1982	Tulsa	United States	Mabee Arena			
28 August 1982	Oklahoma City	United States	The Myriad			
29 August 1982	Wichita	United States	Henry Levitt Arena			
30 August 1982	Omaha	United States	Omaha Civic Auditorium			
1 September 1982	Denver	United States	Red Rocks Amphitheatre	18,000/18,000	$222,623	
2 September 1982	Denver	United States	Red Rocks Amphitheatre	18,000/18,000	$222,623	
4 September 1982	Berkeley	United States	Hearst Greek Theatre	8,500/8,500	$114,750	
5 September 1982	Irvine	United States	Irvine Meadows			
6 September 1982	Irvine	United States	Irvine Meadows			
Fall/Winter leg
17 October 1982	Gainesville	United States	Stephen C. O'Connell Center			
18 October 1982	Tallahassee	United States	Tallahassee-Leon County Civic Center			
20 October 1982	Atlanta	United States	The Omni	9,948/11,242	$133,044	
21 October 1982	Greensboro	United States	Greensboro Coliseum			
22 October 1982	Charlotte	United States	Charlotte Coliseum	9,256/10,061	$109,965	
24 October 1982	Biloxi	United States	Mississippi Coast Coliseum			
25 October 1982	Baton Rouge	United States	LSU Assembly Centre			
26 October 1982	Memphis	United States	Mid South Coliseum			
28 October 1982	Birmingham	United States	Birmingham-Jefferson Civic Center Coliseum			
29 October 1982	Knoxville	United States	Stokely Athletic Center	7,407/12,400	$84,620	
30 October 1982	Murfreesboro	United States	Mid-Tennessee State University	7,952/12,224	$100,623	
2 November 1982	Lexington	United States	Rupp Arena			
3 November 1982	Dayton	United States	Hara Arena			
5 November 1982	Rochester	United States	War Memorial			
6 November 1982	New Haven	United States	Veterans Memorial Coliseum	10,547/10,547	$127,654	
7 November 1982	Worcester	United States	The Centrum	12,337/12,337	$148,154	
9 November 1982	Toledo	United States	Centennial Hall			
10 November 1982	Madison	United States	Dane County Coliseum			
12 November 1982	La Crosse	United States	La Crosse Center			
14 November 1982	Ames	United States	Hilton Coliseum			
16 November 1982	Saint Paul	United States	St Paul Civic Arena			
17 November 1982	Cedar Rapids	United States	Five Seasons Centre			
26 November 1982	Los Angeles	United States	Universal Amphitheater			
27 November 1982	Los Angeles	United States	Universal Amphitheater			
28 November 1982	Los Angeles	United States	Universal Amphitheater			
1 December 1982	San Diego	United States	San Diego Sports Arena	10,153/14,217	$131,271	
3 December 1982	Oakland	United States	Oakland-Alameda County Coliseum	11,405/14,000	$149,607	
5 December 1982	Portland, Oregon	United States	Portland Memorial Coliseum	8,907/12,110	$107,432	
7 December 1982	Seattle	United States	Seattle Center Coliseum			

== 1983 tour dates ==
Tours
Date	City	Country	Venue
5 June 1983	Chicago	United States	Chicago Stadium
Europe Tour
11 June 1983	Paris	France	Hippodrome de Pantin
12 June 1983	Rotterdam	Netherlands	Ahoy
14 June 1983	Hamburg	West Germany	Wilhelm-Koch-Stadion
15 June 1983	West Berlin	West Germany	Waldbühne
17 June 1983	Essen	West Germany	Georg-Melches Stadion
18 June 1983	Darmstadt	West Germany	Stadion Am Bollenfaltor
19 June 1983	Augsburg	West Germany	Rosenaustadion
21 June 1983	Toulouse	France	Palais des Sports
26 June 1983	San Sebastián	Spain	Velódromo de Anoeta
28 June 1983	Rome	Italy	Capannelle Racecourse
30 June 1983	Milan	Italy	Palasport di San Siro
1 July 1983	Milan	Italy	Palasport di San Siro
2 July 1983	Fréjus	France	Arènes de Fréjus
3 July 1983	St. Gallen	Switzerland	Sittertobel
5 July 1983	Lyon	France	Palais des Sports de Gerland
7 July 1983	Lorient	France	Stade du Moustoir
9 July 1983	Birmingham	England	National Exhibition Centre
11 July 1983	London	England	Wembley Arena
12 July 1983	London	England	Wembley Arena
