= Crosby, Stills, Nash and Young 1969–1970 tours =

1969–70 concert tour by Crosby, Stills, Nash & Young

Crosby, Stills, Nash & Young 1969–1970 tours
- Tour by Crosby, Stills, Nash & Young
- Poster with the 1969 tour dates
- Start date: August 16, 1969
- End date: July 9, 1970
- Legs: 2
- No. of shows: 42

Crosby, Stills, Nash & Young concert chronology
- Crosby, Stills, Nash & Young 1969–1970 tours; CSNY 1974

The Crosby, Stills, Nash & Young 1969 and 1970 concert tours were two separate tours that covered North America, and Europe, before the band broke up for the first time.

== History ==
=== First tour ===
The first tour starting in 1969 and finishing with three dates in Europe in January 1970, was the first Crosby, Stills, Nash & Young tour. The tour was notable for performing at many of the era's major festivals including their second ever gig, a one-hour show at the Woodstock Festival in the early morning of August 18, 1969, which was a baptism by fire for the group. The crowd of industry friends looking on from offstage was intimidating and prompted Stills to say, "This is the second time we've ever played in front of people, man. We're scared shitless." Their appearance at the festival and in the subsequent movie Woodstock, boosted the visibility of the quartet tremendously. Footage from two performances from the Big Sur Folk Festival (held on the grounds of the Esalen Institute on September 13–14, 1969) appears in the movie Celebration at Big Sur. They also appeared at the violence-plagued Altamont Free Concert on December 6, 1969, alongside Santana, Jefferson Airplane, The Flying Burrito Brothers and the headlining Rolling Stones. At the band's request, their performance was not included in the subsequent film Gimme Shelter (1970). During this tour they also appeared on the television show This Is Tom Jones, performing "You Don't Have To Cry" and with Tom Jones, "Long Time Gone". They also appeared on the television show The Music Scene performing "Down By The River".

After a break for Christmas they finished this tour with three dates in Europe, attending the Royal Albert Hall, was a who's who of British rock musicians including Paul McCartney, Donovan and Led Zeppelin's Jimmy Page and Robert Plant.

During time off in the first tour and in between the two tours, the band recorded and released their second studio album and their first as the quartet with Neil Young on board, Déjà Vu.

=== Second tour ===
The 1970 tour got off to a rocky start, in consultation with other band members, Stills fired Reeves from the group shortly before the beginning of their second American tour in April 1970 "because [he] suddenly decided he was an Apache witch doctor." He further opined that "[Reeves] freaked too much on the bass and no one could keep up because [he] did not play one rhythm the same… he could play bass imaginatively, but he has to be predictable as well," while "Greg also wanted to sing some of his songs on the CSN&Y show, which I thought was ludicrous, only because the songs weren't great. We'll sing any song if it's great, but not just because it happens to be written by our bass player." He was replaced by Calvin "Fuzzy" Samuels, a homeless Jamaican musician recently discovered by Stills at Island Records' London studios. Shortly thereafter, Taylor (who frequently clashed with Young over the band's tempos during the first tour and Déjà Vu sessions) was also dismissed when Young threatened to leave the group following the first performance of the tour at the Denver Coliseum on May 12, 1970. Notwithstanding these previous tensions, Taylor would later assert that his dismissal stemmed from a flirtation with Young's first wife (Topanga Canyon restaurateur Susan Acevedo) amid renewed conflict between Stills and Young in the aftermath of Reeves' firing. Shortly thereafter, drummer John Barbata (formerly of The Turtles) was hired for the remainder of the tour and associated recordings.

As the 23-show tour progressed, the tenuous nature of the partnership was strained by Stills' alcohol and cocaine abuse and perceived megalomania, culminating in an extended solo set not countenanced by the other band members at the Fillmore East when he was informed that Bob Dylan was in the audience. In this turbulent atmosphere, Crosby, Nash and Young decided to fire Stills during a two-night stint at Chicago's Auditorium Theatre in July 1970. Following his reinstatement, the tour ended as scheduled in Bloomington, Minnesota on July 9, 1970; however, the group broke up immediately thereafter. Concert recordings from dates at the Fillmore East, and The Forum in June 1970 and at the Auditorium Theater in July 1970 were assembled by Nash, and produced the 1971 double album 4 Way Street, which topped the charts during a 42-week stay. Although they would continue to collaborate in various and largely ephemeral permutations, the four members would not come back together in earnest until their 1974 reunion tour.

== Personnel ==
- David Crosby — vocals, guitars
- Stephen Stills — vocals, guitars, keyboards
- Graham Nash — vocals, guitars, organ
- Neil Young — vocals, guitars, keyboards
- Greg Reeves — bass first tour
- Calvin "Fuzzy" Samuels – bass second tour
- Dallas Taylor — drums first tour and May 12
- Johnny Barbata — drums second tour except May 12

== Tour setlist ==
A typical set list for the first tour included the following, although there were substitutions, variations and order switches throughout the tour.

=== First tour ===
1. "Suite: Judy Blues Eyes" (Stills)
2. "Blackbird" (Lennon/McCartney)
3. "Guinevere" (Crosby)
4. "Helplessly Hoping" (Stills)
5. "Lady Of The Island" (Nash)
6. "On The Way Home" (Young)
7. "Black Queen" (Stills)
8. "I've Loved Her So Long" (Young)
9. "You Don't Have To Cry" (Stills)
10. "Pre-Road Downs" (Nash)
11. "Long Time Gone" (Crosby)
12. "Bluebird Revisited" (Stills)
13. "Sea Of Madness" (Young)
14. "Wooden Ships" (Crosby, Stills, Kantner)
15. "Down By The River" (Young)

=== Second tour ===
A typical set list for the second included the following, although there were substitutions, variations and order switches throughout the tour. The tour always started off with an acoustic set, with "Suite Judy Blue" Eyes opening, then solo/duo sets from Crosby, Nash, Young, then Stills, the songs in the solo spots were continually changing. A ten-minute interval section was taken before the electric set began, opening with "Pre-Road Downs", and generally finishing with "Carry On". They would then return for "Woodstock" and/or an acoustic "Find The Cost Of Freedom" for the encore.

1. "Suite: Judy Blues Eyes" (Stills)
2. "Blackbird" (Lennon/McCartney)
3. "On The Way Home" (Young)
4. "Teach Your Children" (Nash)
5. "Triad" (Crosby)
6. "Guinevere" (Crosby)
7. "Simple Man" (Nash)
8. "Man In The Mirror" (Nash)
9. "Tell Me Why" (Young)
10. "Down By The River" (Young)
11. "49 Bye-Byes/America's Children" (Stills)
12. "Love The One You're With" (Stills)
13. "Pre-Road Downs" (Nash)
14. "Helplessly Hoping" (Stills)
15. "Long Time Gone" (Crosby)
16. "As I Come Of Age" (Stills)
17. "Southern Man" (Young)
18. "Ohio" (Young)
19. "Carry On" (Stills)
20. "Woodstock" (Joni Mitchell)
21. "Find The Cost Of Freedom" (Stills)

== First tour dates ==
Tour
Date	City	Country	Venue
August 16, 1969 (2 shows)	Chicago	United States	Auditorium Theatre
August 18, 1969	Bethel	United States	Woodstock festival
August 25, 1969	Los Angeles	United States	Greek Theatre
August 26, 1969	Los Angeles	United States	Greek Theatre
August 27, 1969	Los Angeles	United States	Greek Theatre
August 28, 1969	Los Angeles	United States	Greek Theatre
August 29, 1969	Los Angeles	United States	Greek Theatre
August 30, 1969	Los Angeles	United States	Greek Theatre
August 31, 1969	Los Angeles	United States	Greek Theatre
September 5, 1969	Los Angeles	United States	ABC Studios The Music Scene
September 6, 1969	Los Angeles	United States	ABC Studios This Is Tom Jones
September 13, 1969	Big Sur	United States	Big Sur Folk Festival; Esalen Institute
September 14, 1969	Big Sur	United States	Big Sur Folk Festival; Esalen Institute
September 19, 1969	New York City	United States	Fillmore East (4 Shows)
September 20, 1969	New York City	United States	Fillmore East (4 Shows)
October 11, 1969	New Haven	United States	New Haven Arena
November 9, 1969	Santa Barbara	United States	Campus Stadium
November 13, 1969	San Francisco	United States	Winterland Ballroom
November 14, 1969	San Francisco	United States	Winterland Ballroom
November 15, 1969	San Francisco	United States	Winterland Ballroom
November 16, 1969	San Francisco	United States	Winterland Ballroom
November 22, 1969	Honolulu	United States	HIC Arena
November 26, 1969	Denver	United States	Denver Coliseum
November 27, 1969	Salt Lake City	United States	Salt Palace
November 28, 1969	Dallas	United States	Memorial Auditorium
November 29, 1969	Phoenix	United States	Arizona Veterans Memorial Coliseum
December 5, 1969	Sacramento	United States	Counties Building – Cal Expo
December 6, 1969	Livermore	United States	Altamont Speedway
December 6, 1969	Westwood	United States	Pauley Pavilion
December 11, 1969	Pittsburgh	United States	Civic Arena
December 12, 1969	Cleveland	United States	Public Hall
December 13, 1969	Chicago	United States	Auditorium Theatre
December 14, 1969	Detroit	United States	Masonic Temple Theater
December 17, 1969	Albuquerque	United States	Tingley Coliseum
December 18, 1969	Houston	United States	Hofheinz Pavilion
December 21, 1969	San Diego	United States	Balboa Stadium
Europe
January 6, 1970	London	United Kingdom	Royal Albert Hall
January 9, 1970	Stockholm	Sweden	Konserthuset
January 11, 1970	Copenhagen	Denmark	Falkonercentret

== Second tour dates ==
Tour
Dates	City	Country	Venue
May 12, 1970	Denver	United States	Denver Coliseum
May 29, 1970	Boston	United States	Boston Garden
May 30, 1970	Baltimore	United States	Civic Center
June 2, 1970	New York City	United States	Fillmore East
June 3, 1970	New York City	United States	Fillmore East
June 4, 1970	New York City	United States	Fillmore East
June 5, 1970	New York City	United States	Fillmore East
June 6, 1970	New York City	United States	Fillmore East
June 7, 1970	New York City	United States	Fillmore East
June 9, 1970	Providence	United States	Rhode Island Auditorium
June 10, 1970	Philadelphia	United States	The Spectrum
June 12, 1970	Detroit	United States	Olympia Stadium
June 16, 1970	Portland	United States	Memorial Coliseum
June 17, 1970	Seattle	United States	Seattle Center Coliseum
June 19, 1970	Oakland	United States	Oakland Coliseum Arena
June 26, 1970	Inglewood	United States	The Forum
June 28, 1970	Inglewood	United States	The Forum
July 1, 1970	St. Louis	United States	Kiel Municipal Auditorium
July 3, 1970	Cleveland	United States	Public Hall
July 5, 1970	Chicago	United States	Auditorium Theatre
July 6, 1970	Chicago	United States	Auditorium Theatre
July 7, 1970	Madison	United States	Dane County Veterans Memorial Coliseum
July 9, 1970	Bloomington	United States	Metropolitan Sports Center

== Extra dates ==
These were extra dates, not part of the main tours, but before the 1974 reunion tour.

Dates	City	Country	Venue	Notes
September 30, 1971	New York City	United States	Carnegie Hall	Stephen Stills and Neil Young drop by a Crosby & Nash show
October 3, 1971	Boston	United States	Boston Music Hall	Stephen Stills and Neil Young drop by a Crosby & Nash show
October 4, 1971	New York City	United States	Carnegie Hall	Stephen Stills and Neil Young drop by a Crosby & Nash show
October 4, 1973	San Francisco	United States	Winterland Arena	Crosby, Nash & Young drop by a Stephen Stills Manassas show
October 7, 1973	San Francisco	United States	Winterland Arena	Crosby & Nash drop by a Stephen Stills Manassas show
