= Fair Game (song) =

- Canadian single a-side label

Single by Crosby, Stills & Nash

from the album CSN
- B-side: "Anything at All"
- Released: October 1977
- Length: 3:30
- Label: Atlantic
- Songwriter: Stephen Stills
- Producers: Crosby, Stills & Nash; The Albert Brothers

Crosby, Stills & Nash singles chronology
"Just a Song Before I Go" (1977)	"Fair Game" (1977)	"Wasted on the Way" (1982)

"Fair Game" is a song by the American folk rock supergroup Crosby, Stills & Nash, released as the second single from their third studio album CSN (1977) in October 1977 on Atlantic Records.

== Background ==
Fair Game was written by Stephen Stills and tells a story of women looking for love in singles bars, as Bill Siddons said; "Stephen was the groove and rhythm and sex of the band, and Graham and David were the ephemeral ones." The track features Ray Barretto on congas.

== Release and reception ==
Record World called the single a "mid-tempo [track] with samba touches, with [Crosby, Stills & Nash]'s trademark vocal harmonies again standing out." Billboard said the track has "Clean acoustic guitar picking[ which] highlights this moody, highly rhythmic light rocker." noting the harmonies to be "tight" while "the overall effect is hypnotic." Cashbox stated the track "combines a snappy Latin rhythm, neatly interlocking harmonies, and layers of Stephen Stills' thoughtful acoustical guitar work." The Lexington Herald-Leader states the song "perfectly profiles the plain woman who has decided to use rather than be used; the song is a little sociological pearl."

== Charts ==
Weekly chart performance for "Fair Game"
Chart (1977)	Peak position
Canadian Top Singles (RPM)	10
US Billboard Hot 100	68

== Personnel ==
Crosby, Stills & Nash

- Stephen Stills – acoustic lead guitar, timbales, vocals
- David Crosby – acoustic rhythm guitar, vocals
- Graham Nash – vocals

Additional musicians

- Joe Vitale – drums, organ
- Ray Barretto – congas
- George "Chocolate" Perry – bass
