= List of Crosby, Stills, Nash (& Young) concert tours (2000s–10s) =

The folk-rock group Crosby, Stills & Nash have toured annually since 1990 with a few exceptions. In 2000, 2002 and 2006 they reunited with Neil Young to tour. Touring has tended to focus on North America, but the band have also played other parts of the world, notably Europe.

== 2000 CSNY2K Looking Forward Tour ==
=== Lineup ===
- David Crosby – guitar, vocals
- Stephen Stills – guitar, keyboards, vocals
- Graham Nash – guitar, keyboards, vocals
- Neil Young – guitar, vocals
- Donald Dunn – bass
- Jim Keltner – drums

== 2001 Tour ==
2001 Tour
- United States tour by Crosby, Stills & Nash
- Location: North America
- Start date: 22 September 1999
- End date: 13 August 2001
- Legs: 1
- No. of shows: 22

=== Lineup ===
- David Crosby – guitar, vocals
- Stephen Stills – guitar, keyboards, vocals
- Graham Nash – guitar, keyboards, vocals
- Mike Finnigan – keyboards
- James Hutchinson – bass
- Joe Vitale – drums

== 2002 CSNY Tour ==
=== Lineup ===
- David Crosby – guitar, vocals
- Stephen Stills – guitar, keyboards, vocals
- Graham Nash – guitar, keyboards, vocals
- Neil Young – guitar, vocals
- Booker T. Jones – keyboards
- Donald Dunn – bass
- Steve Potts – drums

== 2003 Tour ==
2003 Tour
- United States tour by Crosby, Stills & Nash
- Location: North America
- Start date: 11 January 2003
- End date: 29 September 2004
- Legs: 1

=== Lineup ===
- David Crosby – guitar, vocals
- Stephen Stills – guitar, keyboards, vocals
- Graham Nash – guitar, keyboards, vocals
- Mike Finnigan – keyboards
- David Santos – bass
- Joe Vitale – drums

== 2005 Greatest Hits Tour ==
2005 Tour
- World tour by Crosby, Stills & Nash
- Location: North America, Europe
- Start date: 1 January 2005
- End date: 30 October 2005
- Legs: 1
- No. of shows: 58

=== Lineup ===
- David Crosby – guitar, vocals
- Stephen Stills – guitar, keyboards, vocals
- Graham Nash – guitar, keyboards, vocals
- Jeff Pevar – guitar
- Mike Finnigan – keyboards
- James Raymond – keyboards
- David Santos – bass
- Joe Vitale – drums

== 2006 CSNY Freedom of Speech Tour ==
=== Lineup ===
- David Crosby – guitar, vocals
- Stephen Stills – guitar, keyboards, vocals
- Graham Nash – guitar, keyboards, vocals
- Neil Young – guitar, vocals
- Ben Keith – pedal steel
- Spooner Oldham – keyboards
- Rick Rosas – bass
- Chad Cromwell – drums
- Tom Bray – trumpet

== 2007 Tour ==
2007 Tour
- World tour by Crosby, Stills & Nash
- Location: North America, Australia, New Zealand
- Start date: 20 February 2007
- End date: 15 December 2007
- Legs: 2
- No. of shows: 18

=== Lineup ===
- David Crosby – guitar, vocals
- Stephen Stills – guitar, keyboards, vocals
- Graham Nash – guitar, keyboards, vocals
- James Raymond – keyboards
- Todd Caldwell – keyboards
- Kevin McCormick – bass
- Joe Vitale – drums

== 2008 Tour ==
2008 Tour
- World tour by Crosby, Stills & Nash
- Location: North America
- Start date: 31 May 2008
- End date: 9 August 2008
- Legs: 1
- No. of shows: 40

=== Lineup ===
- David Crosby – guitar, vocals
- Stephen Stills – guitar, keyboards, vocals
- Graham Nash – guitar, keyboards, vocals
- James Raymond – keyboards
- Todd Caldwell – keyboards
- Kevin McCormick – bass
- Joe Vitale – drums

== 2009 Demos Tour ==
2009 Tour
- World tour by Crosby, Stills & Nash
- Location: North America, Europe
- Start date: 3 June 2009
- End date: 30 October 2009
- Legs: 1
- No. of shows: 54

=== Lineup ===
- David Crosby – guitar, vocals
- Stephen Stills – guitar, keyboards, vocals
- Graham Nash – guitar, keyboards, vocals
- James Raymond – keyboards
- Todd Caldwell – keyboards
- Kevin McCormick – bass
- Joe Vitale – drums

== 2010 Tour ==
2010 Tour
- World tour by Crosby, Stills & Nash
- Location: North America, Europe
- Start date: 14 May 2010
- End date: 1 October 2010
- Legs: 1
- No. of shows: 62

=== Lineup ===
- David Crosby – guitar, vocals
- Stephen Stills – guitar, keyboards, vocals
- Graham Nash – guitar, keyboards, vocals
- James Raymond – keyboards
- Todd Caldwell – keyboards
- Kevin McCormick – bass
- Joe Vitale – drums

== 2012–13 Tour ==
2012–13 Tour
- World tour by Crosby, Stills & Nash
- Location: North America, South America, Europe
- Start date: 24 March 2012
- End date: 27 October 2013
- Legs: 1
- No. of shows: 140

=== Lineup ===
- David Crosby – guitar, vocals
- Stephen Stills – guitar, keyboards, vocals
- Graham Nash – guitar, keyboards, vocals
- Shane Fontayne – guitars
- James Raymond – keyboards
- Todd Caldwell – keyboards
- Kevin McCormick – bass
- Steve DiStanislao – drums

== 2014 Tour ==
2014 Tour
- United States tour by Crosby, Stills & Nash
- Location: North America
- Start date: 4 March 2014
- End date: 4 October 2014
- Legs: 1
- No. of shows: 57

=== Lineup ===
- David Crosby – guitar, vocals
- Stephen Stills – guitar, keyboards, vocals
- Graham Nash – guitar, keyboards, vocals
- Shane Fontayne – guitars
- James Raymond – keyboards
- Todd Caldwell – keyboards
- Kevin McCormick – bass
- Steve DiStanislao – drums

== 2015 Tour ==
2015 Tour
- World tour by Crosby, Stills & Nash
- Location: World
- Start date: 6 February 2015
- End date: 3 December 2015
- Legs: 1
- No. of shows: 47

=== Lineup ===
- David Crosby – guitar, vocals
- Stephen Stills – guitar, keyboards, vocals
- Graham Nash – guitar, keyboards, vocals
- Shane Fontayne – guitars
- James Raymond – keyboards
- Todd Caldwell – keyboards
- Kevin McCormick – bass
- Russ Kunkel – drums
