= CSN (album) =

Studio album by Crosby, Stills & Nash
- Released: June 17, 1977
- Recorded: 1976–1977
- Genre: Rock
- Length: 43:50
- Label: Atlantic
- Producers: David Crosby, Stephen Stills and Graham Nash with Ron Albert and Howard Albert

Crosby, Stills & Nash chronology
| So Far (1974) | CSN (1977) | Replay (1980) |

Singles from CSN
- 1. "Just a Song Before I Go" Released: June 17, 1977; 2. "Fair Game" Released: October 1977

CSN is the third studio album by Crosby, Stills & Nash, released on Atlantic Records on June 17, 1977. It is the group's second studio release in the trio configuration. It peaked at No. 2 on the Billboard Top Pop Albums chart; two singles taken from the album, Nash's "Just a Song Before I Go" (No. 7) and Stills' "Fair Game" (No. 43) charted on the Billboard Hot 100. As of 2012 it is the trio configuration's best selling record, outselling 1969's Crosby, Stills & Nash by 200,000 copies. It has been certified quadruple platinum by RIAA.

== Content ==
Following their tour in the spring and summer of 1970 to support Déjà Vu, Crosby, Stills and Nash had only completed one project together, a 1974 reunion tour of CSNY. David Crosby and Graham Nash had recorded three albums as a duo, with Crosby releasing a single solo album (in addition to a Byrds reunion album) and Nash a pair. Stephen Stills pursued other projects including the release of four solo albums, a short career with Manassas that yielded two albums, as well as a tour and an album with Neil Young, which itself nearly became a CSNY project.

CSN featured strong writing from all three members, the last time for seven years that the band would compose songs and handle vocals without major assistance from outside sources.

Many of Stills' songs on the album echo his marital problems, with "Dark Star" returning to the Latin rhythms he had favored all the way back to his Buffalo Springfield days. Crosby continued the existential probings consistent with much of his past work, and Nash offered both a radio-ready acoustic ballad with "Just a Song Before I Go", and an elaborate set piece re-creating a vision of an LSD experience that he had in Winchester Cathedral with "Cathedral". A few tracks included a string section, a first on a CSN project.

The album was remastered for compact disc an initial time in the 1980s, then again at Ocean View Digital from the original tapes and reissued on September 20, 1994. It was remastered once more by Steve Hoffman in April 2013, for an Audio Fidelity 24kt gold disk release in the summer of 2013.

== Critical reception ==
Professional ratings
Review scores
| Source | Rating |
|---|---|
| AllMusic | 4/5 stars |
| Christgau's Record Guide | D+ |
| The Rolling Stone Album Guide | 3/5 stars |

Cash Box said that "Fair Game" "combines a snappy Latin rhythm, neatly interlocking harmonies, and layers of Stephen Stills' thoughtful acoustic guitar work." It commented on the "surging guitars and piano" and "harmonic hooks" and "powerful rhythmic elements" of "I Give You Give Blind".

Record World called "Fair Game" a "mid-tempo Stills song with samba touches, with the trio's trademark vocal harmonies again standing out."

== Track listing ==
Side one
| No. | Title | Writer(s) | Lead vocals | Length |
|---|---|---|---|---|
| 1. | "Shadow Captain" | David Crosby; Craig Doerge | Crosby, Stills & Nash | 4:32 |
| 2. | "See the Changes" | Stephen Stills | Stills with Crosby & Nash | 2:56 |
| 3. | "Carried Away" | Graham Nash | Nash with Crosby | 2:29 |
| 4. | "Fair Game" | Stills | Stills with Crosby & Nash | 3:30 |
| 5. | "Anything at All" | Crosby | Crosby | 3:01 |
| 6. | "Cathedral" | Nash | Nash with Crosby | 5:15 |

Side two
| No. | Title | Writer(s) | Lead vocals | Length |
|---|---|---|---|---|
| 1. | "Dark Star" | Stills | Stills | 4:43 |
| 2. | "Just a Song Before I Go" | Nash | Nash | 2:12 |
| 3. | "Run from Tears" | Stills | Stills | 4:09 |
| 4. | "Cold Rain" | Nash | Nash | 2:32 |
| 5. | "In My Dreams" | Crosby | Crosby | 5:10 |
| 6. | "I Give You Give Blind" | Stills | Stills with Crosby & Nash | 3:21 |

== Personnel ==
- David Crosby – vocals; rhythm guitar on "Fair Game" and "Dark Star"; acoustic guitar on "Just A Song Before I Go" and "In My Dreams"; string arrangements on "Cathedral" and "Cold Rain"
- Stephen Stills – vocals; guitars on all tracks except "Carried Away", "Cathedral" and "Cold Rain" electric piano on "Anything at All"; piano, string arrangements on "I Give You Give Blind"; timbales on "Fair Game"
- Graham Nash – vocals; piano on "Carried Away", "Cathedral", "Just A Song Before I Go", and "Cold Rain"; harmonica on "Carried Away"; string arrangements on "Cathedral" and "Cold Rain"

Additional musicians

- Joe Vitale – drums on "Carried Away", "Fair Game", "Cathedral", "Dark Star", "Run From Tears" and "I Give You Give Blind"; organ on "Shadow Captain", "Fair Game", "Anything at All", "Dark Star"; electric piano on "Carried Away", "Just A Song Before I Go"; percussion on "Cathedral", "I Give You Give Blind"; flute on "Shadow Captain"; timpani on "Cathedral"; vibraphone on "In My Dreams"
- Craig Doerge – piano on "Shadow Captain" and "Anything at All"; electric piano on "Shadow Captain" and "Dark Star"
- Mike Finnigan – organ on "Run From Tears"
- George "Chocolate" Perry – bass guitar on "Shadow Captain", "Fair Game", "Anything at All", "Cathedral", "Dark Star", and "I Give You Give Blind"
- Jimmy Haslip – bass guitar on "Carried Away"
- Tim Drummond – bass guitar on "Just A Song Before I Go"
- Gerald Johnson – bass on "Run From Tears"
- Russ Kunkel – drums on "Shadow Captain", "Anything at All", "Just A Song Before I Go", and "In My Dreams"; congas on "Shadow Captain", "Dark Star"; percussion on "Just A Song Before I Go"
- Ray Barretto – congas on "Fair Game"
- Mike Lewis – string arrangements on "Cathedral", "Cold Rain", and "I Give You Give Blind"
- Joel Bernstein – string arrangements on "Cathedral"

Production

- Crosby, Stills & Nash – producers
- Howard Albert, Ron Albert – co-producers, engineers
- Steve Gursky – assistant engineer
- Joel Bernstein – photography
- Gary Burden – art direction, design
- Joe Gastwirt – digital remastering

== Charts ==
Chart performance for CSN
| Chart (1977) | Peak position |
|---|---|
| US Top LPs & Tape (Billboard) | 2 |
| UK Album Charts | 23 |
| Canadian RPM 100 Albums | 9 |
| Norwegian VG-lista Albums | 10 |
| New Zealand Albums Charts | 24 |
| French Album Charts | 23 |
| Swedish Kvällstoppen Chart | 17 |
| Spanish Album Charts | 21 |
| Australian Kent Music Report Chart | 7 |
| Dutch MegaCharts Albums | 4 |
| Italian Album Charts | 24 |
| Austrian Albums Chart | 23 |
| Japanese Oricon LP Chart | 54 |
| US Cash Box Top 100 Albums | 2 |
| US Record World Album Chart | 2 |

Sales chart performance for singles from CSN
| Year | Single | Chart | Position |
|---|---|---|---|
| 1977 | "Just a Song Before I Go" | US Billboard Hot 100 | 7 |
| 1977 | "Just a Song Before I Go" | Netherlands (Single Top 100) | 23 |
| 1977 | "Just a Song Before I Go" | French Singles Charts | 30 |
| 1977 | "Just a Song Before I Go" | Canada Top Singles (RPM) | 10 |
| 1977 | "Just a Song Before I Go" | US Easy Listening (Billboard) | 5 |
| 1977 | "Just a Song Before I Go" | Australia (Go-Set National Top 40) | 59 |
| 1977 | "Just a Song Before I Go" | US Top Singles (Cash Box) | 8 |
| 1977 | "Just a Song Before I Go" | US Top Singles (Record World) | 12 |
| 1977 | "Fair Game" | US Billboard Hot 100 | 43 |
| 1977 | "Fair Game" | Canada Top Singles (RPM) | 42 |
| 1977 | "Fair Game" | US Top Singles (Cash Box) | 47 |
| 1977 | "Fair Game" | US Top Singles (Record World) | 56 |

=== Year-end charts ===
| Chart (1977) | Position |
|---|---|
| Canadian Albums Chart | 52 |
| Italian Albums Chart | 65 |
| Dutch Album Charts | 40 |
| US Billboard 200 | 83 |
| US Cashbox Charts | 15 |

== Certifications ==
| Region | Certification | Certified units/sales |
|---|---|---|
| United States (RIAA) | 4× Platinum | 4,000,000^{^} |
^{^} Shipments figures based on certification alone.

== Tour ==
1977–1978 Reunion Tour
- Tour by Crosby, Stills, Nash & Young
- Start date: 11 May 1977
- End date: 10 August 1978
- Legs: 3

Crosby, Stills, Nash & Young concert chronology
- CSNY 1974; 1977–1978 Reunion Tour; Crosby, Stills & Nash 1982 and 1983 tours

Tours
1977 Tour – Leg #1
| Date | City | Country | Venue |
|---|---|---|---|
| 11 May 1977 | South Bend | United States | Athletic & Convocation Center |
| 2 June 1977 | Clarkston | United States | Pine Knob Music Theatre |
| 3 June 1977 | Clarkston | United States | Pine Knob Music Theatre |
| 4 June 1977 | Clarkston | United States | Pine Knob Music Theatre |
| 7 June 1977 | Landover | United States | Capital Centre |
| 8 June 1977 | Landover | United States | Capital Centre |
| 10 June 1977 | Buffalo | United States | War Memorial Stadium |
| 11 June 1977 | Pittsburgh | United States | Civic Arena |
| 13 June 1977 | Providence | United States | Providence Civic Centre |
| 14 June 1977 | Boston | United States | Boston Garden |
| 15 June 1977 | Hartford | United States | Hartford Civic Centre |
| 17 June 1977 | Uniondale | United States | Nassau Coliseum |
| 18 June 1977 | Hartford | United States | Hartford Civic Center |
| 21 June 1977 | New York City | United States | Madison Square Garden |
| 23 June 1977 | Philadelphia | United States | Spectrum |
| 24 June 1977 | Philadelphia | United States | Spectrum |
| 25 June 1977 | Saratoga | United States | Saratoga Performing Arts Centre |
| 28 June 1977 | Los Angeles | United States | The Forum |
| 29 June 1977 | Los Angeles | United States | The Forum |
| 30 June 1977 | San Diego | United States | San Diego Sports Arena |
| 26 August 1977 | Houston | United States | Six Flags Astroworld |
1977 Tour – Leg #2
| Date | City | Country | Venue |
| 18 October 1977 | Portland | United States | Portland Memorial Coliseum |
| 19 October 1977 | Vancouver | Canada | PNE Coliseum |
| 20 October 1977 | Seattle | United States | Seattle Center Coliseum |
| 22 October 1977 | Oakland | United States | Oakland-Alameda County Coliseum |
| 23 October 1977 | Oakland | United States | Oakland-Alameda County Coliseum |
| 25 October 1977 | Salt Lake City | United States | Salt Palace |
| 27 October 1977 | Denver | United States | McNichols Sports Arena |
| 28 October 1977 | Lincoln | United States | Pershing Municipal Auditorium |
| 29 October 1977 | Ames | United States | Hilton Coliseum |
| 31 October 1977 | St. Paul | United States | St. Paul Civic Center |
| 1 November 1977 | Chicago | United States | Chicago Stadium |
| 4 November 1977 | Cincinnati | United States | Riverfront Coliseum |
| 5 November 1977 | South Bend | United States | Athletic & Convocation Center |
| 6 November 1977 | Lexington | United States | Rupp Arena |
| 9 November 1977 | Memphis | United States | Mid-South Coliseum |
| 10 November 1977 | Murfreesboro | United States | Murphy Athletic Centre |
| 12 November 1977 | Greensboro | United States | Greensboro Coliseum |
| 14 November 1977 | Atlanta | United States | The Omni |
| 15 November 1977 | Birmingham | United States | Jefferson County Civic Center |
| 16 November 1977 | Mobile | United States | Municipal Auditorium |
| 18 November 1977 | Jacksonville | United States | Jacksonville Memorial Coliseum |
| 19 November 1977 | Lakeland | United States | Lakeland Civic Center |
| 20 November 1977 | Miami | United States | Sportatorium |
| 22 November 1977 | Houston | United States | The Summit |
| 23 November 1977 | Fort Worth | United States | Tarrant County Convention Center |
| 24 November 1977 | Oklahoma City | United States | The Myriad |
1978 Tour
| Date | City | Country | Venue |
| 7 July 1978 | Indianapolis | United States | Market Square Arena |
| 8 July 1978 | Louisville | United States | Freedom Hall |
| 11 July 1978 | Clarkston | United States | Pine Knob Music Theater |
| 12 July 1978 | Clarkston | United States | Pine Knob Music Theater |
| 13 July 1978 | Clarkston | United States | Pine Knob Music Theater |
| 14 July 1978 | Clarkston | United States | Pine Knob Music Theater |
| 15 July 1978 | Detroit | United States | Masonic Temple |
| 16 July 1978 | Buffalo | United States | Memorial Auditorium |
| 17 July 1978 | Saratoga | United States | Saratoga Performing Arts Centre |
| 18 July 1978 | Montreal | Canada | Montreal Forum |
| 20 July 1978 | Providence | United States | Providence Civic Center |
| 22 July 1978 | New York City | United States | Madison Square Garden |
| 23 July 1978 | New Haven | United States | New Haven Coliseum |
| 24 July 1978 | Saratoga Springs | United States | Saratoga Performing Arts Center |
| 26 July 1978 | Pittsburgh | United States | Civic Arena Pittsburgh |
| 28 July 1978 | Landover | United States | Capital Center |
| 30 July 1978 | Uniondale | United States | Nassau Coliseum |
| 31 July 1978 | Uniondale | United States | Nassau Coliseum |
| 1 August 1978 | Springfield | United States | Springfield Civic Center |
| 2 August 1978 | Boston | United States | Boston Garden |
| 4 August 1978 | Philadelphia | United States | Robin Hood Dell West |
| 5 August 1978 | Philadelphia | United States | Robin Hood Dell West |
| 6 August 1978 | Hampton | United States | Hampton Coliseum |
| 8 August 1978 | Huntington | United States | Huntington Civic Center |
| 9 August 1978 | Cleveland | United States | Richfield Coliseum |
| 10 August 1978 | Cincinnati | United States | Riverfront Coliseum |
