= Just a Song Before I Go =

Single by Crosby, Stills & Nash

from the album CSN
- B-side: "Dark Star"
- Released: June 17, 1977
- Genre: Folk rock; soft rock
- Length: 2:14
- Label: Atlantic
- Songwriter: Graham Nash
- Producers: David Crosby; Stephen Stills; Graham Nash; The Albert Brothers

Crosby, Stills & Nash singles chronology
"Our House" (1970)	"Just a Song Before I Go" (1977)	"Fair Game" (1977)

"Just a Song Before I Go" is a song by Crosby, Stills & Nash that appeared on the 1977 album CSN. It was also released as a single and reached number 7 on the Billboard Hot 100 for two consecutive weeks ending August 27 and September 3, 1977, becoming the band's highest-charting hit. It is also one of the band's shortest songs, with a running time of only 2:14. In Canada, it peaked at number 10.

== Background ==
The song was written by Graham Nash about leaving loved ones behind before going on a concert tour. It was written in Hawaii in about 20 minutes at the piano while Nash and Leslie Morris were staying with a friend, later revealed to be a rather "low-level drug dealer". Nash had a little while to get to the airport to head back to his home in Los Angeles. The dealer queried Nash something along the lines of "You're a big shot song writer, I bet you can't write a song just before you go." In response to Nash asking how much the dealer was betting, he wagered $500. In a February 25, 2016, interview on The Late Show with Stephen Colbert, Nash stated that he still has that $500. This song came in the nick of time, because an upcoming hurricane was about to wreak havoc on the island.

Billboard praised the "hypnotically soothing orchestration" and the vocal harmonies. Cash Box said that "an unmistakable vocal blend and Stephen Stills' smooth electric guitar licks are here" and called the melody "gentle." Record World called it "a quiet, melodic song with a dreamy air."

Crosby, Stills and Nash arranged "Just a Song Before I Go" as a straight ballad, with mostly acoustic textures anchored by two electric guitar solos from Stephen Stills.

== Personnel ==
- David Crosby – vocals, acoustic guitar
- Stephen Stills – vocals, electric guitar
- Graham Nash – vocals, piano

=== Additional musicians ===
- Joe Vitale – electric piano
- Tim Drummond – bass
- Russ Kunkel – drums, percussion

== Charts ==
=== Weekly charts ===
Chart (1977)	Peak position
Australia (Kent Music Report)	59
Canadian Top Singles (RPM)	10
Netherlands (Single Top 100)	23
U.S. Billboard Hot 100	7
U.S. Cash Box Top 100	8
United States (Record World Singles)	12

=== Year-end charts ===
Chart (1977)	Position
U.S. Billboard Hot 100	47

== Cover versions ==
- In 2008, drummer Russ Kunkel and the group Chateau Beach covered the song on their album Rivage.

== Other sources ==
- Liner notes from the 1991 box set Crosby, Stills and Nash: CSN. The commentary on the songs's genesis is from David Crosby.
