= Masonic Temple Theater =

- U.S. National Register of Historic Places
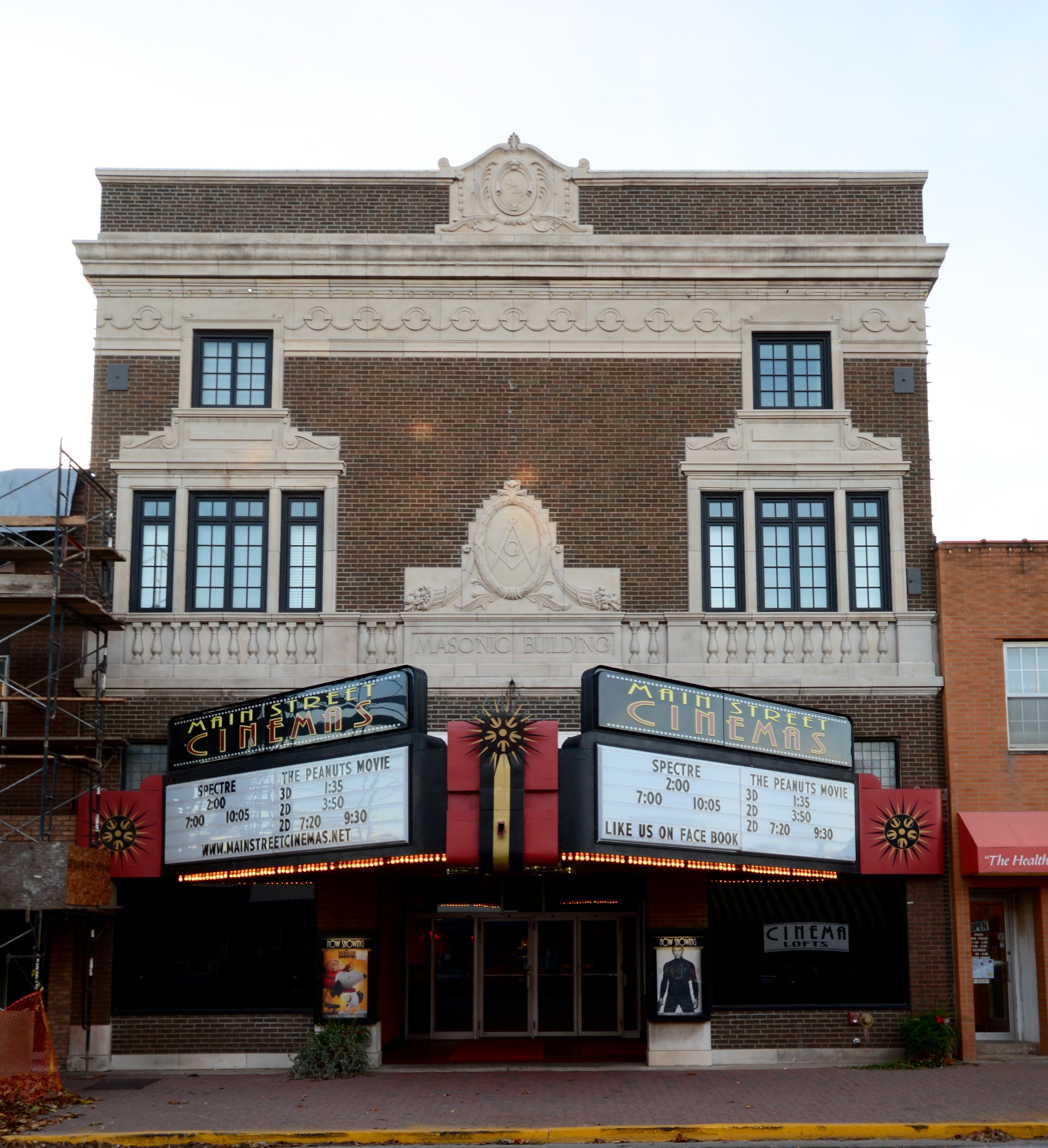

- Location within Iowa Location within the United States
- Location: 115 N. Main; Mount Pleasant, Iowa
- Coordinates: 40°58′2″N 91°33′11″W
- Area: less than one acre
- Built: 1923
- Built by: K.A. Bergdahl
- Architect: Owen, Payson & Carswell;
- Architectural style: Classical Revival
- MPS: Mount Pleasant MPS
- NRHP reference No.: 91001119
- Added to NRHP: September 06, 1991

The Masonic Temple Theater (subsequently the Temple Twin Theaters, and in 2013 the Main Street Cinemas) is a historic building located in Mount Pleasant, Iowa, United States. Built in 1923, it combined both commercial and fraternal functions in one building. The theater company paid for the construction of the lower level, and the Masons paid for the upper level. The Masons continued to occupy the space until 1989 when they moved to another facility. The building was designed in the Neoclassical style by Owen, Payson & Carswell, and K.A. Bergdahl was the contractor who built it. Neoclassical features include the balustrade, the medallion with the Masonic insignia, volutes above the windows, the parapet roof, and the ornamental frieze and cornice.

The building was listed on the National Register of Historic Places in 1991.
