= Crosby, Stills, Nash & Young =

Canadian, American, and British folk rock supergroup

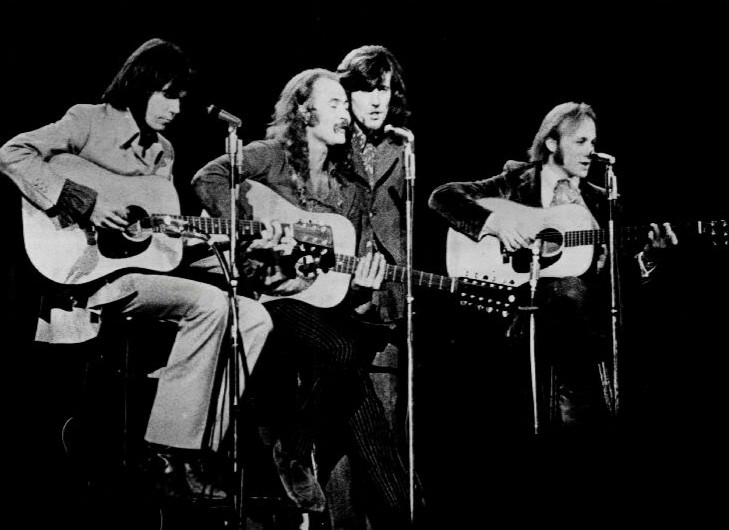
- Left to right: Neil Young, David Crosby, Graham Nash and Stephen Stills in a publicity photo, June 1970

Background information
- Also known as: Crosby, Stills & Nash
- Origin: Los Angeles, California, U.S.
- Genres: Folk rock; soft rock; country rock; folk pop
- Years active: 1968–1970; 1973–1974; 1976–2015
- Labels: Atlantic; Reprise
- Spinoffs: Crosby & Nash; Manassas; The Stills-Young Band
- Spinoff of: Buffalo Springfield; The Byrds; The Hollies
- Past members: David Crosby; Stephen Stills; Graham Nash; Neil Young
- Website: csny.com

Crosby, Stills & Nash (CSN) was a folk rock supergroup composed of the American singer-songwriters David Crosby (formerly of the Byrds) and Stephen Stills (formerly of Buffalo Springfield) and the British-American singer-songwriter Graham Nash (formerly of the Hollies). When joined by the Canadian singer-songwriter Neil Young (also formerly of Buffalo Springfield), they were known as Crosby, Stills, Nash & Young (CSNY). They are noted for their intricate vocal harmonies and lasting influence on American music and culture, their political activism and their tumultuous relationships.

CSN formed in 1968 shortly after Crosby, Stills and Nash performed together informally, discovering they harmonized well. Crosby had been fired from the Byrds in late 1967, Buffalo Springfield had broken up in early 1968, and Nash left the Hollies in December 1968. They signed a recording contract with Atlantic Records in early 1969. Their first album, Crosby, Stills & Nash (1969), produced the Top 40 hits "Suite: Judy Blue Eyes" and "Marrakesh Express". In preparation for touring, the trio added Young, Stills's former Buffalo Springfield bandmate, as an official member, while drummer Dallas Taylor and bassist Greg Reeves were also recruited as touring/session musicians. As Crosby, Stills, Nash & Young, they performed at the Woodstock festival that August.

The band's first album with Young, Déjà Vu, reached number one on several international charts in 1970. It remains their best-selling album, selling more than eight million copies and producing the hit singles "Woodstock", "Teach Your Children", and "Our House". The group's second tour, which produced the live double album 4 Way Street (1971), was fraught with arguments between Young and Taylor – which resulted in Taylor being replaced by John Barbata – and tensions with Stills. At the end of the tour they disbanded. In subsequent years, both CSN and CSNY would reunite several times and release six further studio albums, the last of which was CSNY's Looking Forward in 1999. They continued touring until 2015. Crosby died in 2023.

Crosby, Stills & Nash were inducted into the Rock and Roll Hall of Fame in 1997, and all three members have also been inducted for their work in their previous groups: Crosby for the Byrds, Stills for Buffalo Springfield, and Nash for the Hollies. Young has been inducted as a solo artist and as a member of Buffalo Springfield, though he was not included in the CSN induction.

== History ==
=== CSN formation and debut album: July 1968 – May 1969 ===
CSN emerged when David Crosby, a guitarist and singer-songwriter for the Byrds and Stephen Stills, a guitarist, keyboardist, and singer-songwriter with Buffalo Springfield (which also featured Neil Young), joined with Graham Nash, a guitarist, singer, and songwriter with the Hollies.

Crosby had been sacked from the Byrds in October 1967 due to disagreements over his songwriting. His first meeting with Stills was at the Monterey Pop Festival, where Crosby subbed for Neil Young (who quit the band before the gig) with Buffalo Springfield. By early 1968, Buffalo Springfield had disintegrated and Stills was unemployed following recording of their final album. Following the Monterey gig, Stills and Crosby began meeting informally and jamming. The result of one encounter in Florida on Crosby's schooner was the song "Wooden Ships", composed in collaboration with another guest, Paul Kantner of Jefferson Airplane.

Graham Nash first met Crosby on the Byrds' UK tour of 1966. Two years later, Nash relocated to California in 1968 and resumed his acquaintance with him. Nash met Stills at a party at Peter Tork's house in Laurel Canyon. He was captivated by Stills "banging the shit out of" a piano in a "Brazilian, and Latin, and boogie woogie, and rock and roll" style. In July 1968, over dinner at a party at another Laurel Canyon house (the home of either Joni Mitchell or Cass Elliot—accounts by the three members differ), Nash invited Stills and Crosby to perform a Stills composition, "You Don't Have to Cry". They did so twice, after which Nash had learned the lyrics and improvised a new harmony part on a third rendition. The vocals gelled, and the three realized that they had a very good vocal chemistry. While singing the third time, they broke out in laughter. The Byrds, Buffalo Springfield, and the Hollies had all been successful harmony bands: as Nash said in a 2014 interview, "We knew what we were doing". He continued, "Whatever sound Crosby, Stills, and Nash has was born in 30 seconds. That's how long it took us to harmonize."

Nash decided to quit the Hollies in December 1968 and flew to Los Angeles two days later, feeling that the new-forming CSN would be a better fit for him. The trio traveled to London in early 1969 to rehearse for what turned out to be an unsuccessful audition with the Beatles' Apple Records. However, back in California, Ahmet Ertegun, who had been a fan of Buffalo Springfield and was disappointed by that band's demise, signed them to Atlantic Records. From the outset, given their previous experiences, the trio decided not to be locked into a group structure. They used their surnames as identification to ensure independence and a guarantee that the band could not continue without one of them, unlike both the Byrds and the Hollies. They picked up a management team in Elliot Roberts and David Geffen, who got them signed to Atlantic and helped to gain clout for the group in the industry. Roberts kept the band focused and dealt with egos, while Geffen handled the business deals, since, in Crosby's words, they needed a "shark" and Geffen was it.

The band then ran into a problem. Stills was already signed to Atlantic Records through his Buffalo Springfield contract. Crosby had been released from his Byrds deal with Columbia, as he was considered to be unimportant and too difficult to work with. Nash, however, was still signed to Epic Records through the Hollies. Ertegun cut a deal with Clive Davis to essentially trade Nash to Atlantic in exchange for Richie Furay (who was also signed to Atlantic by virtue of his membership in Buffalo Springfield) and Poco, his new band.

The trio's first album, Crosby, Stills & Nash, was released in May 1969. The eponymously titled album was a major hit in the United States, peaking at No. 6 on the Billboard album chart during a 107-week stay that spawned two Top 40 hits ("Suite: Judy Blue Eyes" [#21] and "Marrakesh Express" [#28]) and significant airplay on FM radio. The album ultimately earned a RIAA triple platinum certification in 1999 and quadruple platinum certification in 2001.

=== CSNY: Déjà Vu to 4 Way Street, August 1969 – April 1971 ===
With the exception of drum parts (primarily performed by Dallas Taylor) and a handful of rhythm and acoustic guitar parts from Crosby and Nash, Stills (accorded the moniker "Captain Many Hands" by his bandmates) handled most of the instrumentation (including every lead guitar, bass and keyboard part) on the album, which left the band in need of additional personnel to be able to tour, a necessity given the debut album's commercial impact.

Retaining Taylor, the band tried initially to hire a keyboard player. Stills initially approached virtuoso multi-instrumentalist Steve Winwood, who was already occupied with the newly formed group Blind Faith. Ertegun suggested Neil Young, also managed by Elliot Roberts, as a fairly obvious choice; Young proved valuable because he could assist with guitar and keyboards by alternating with Stills and Nash in a live setting. Initially, Stills and Nash objected – Stills because of his history with Young in Buffalo Springfield and Nash because of his personal unfamiliarity with Young. Despite that, the trio expanded to a quartet after Young had lunch with Nash. The terms of the contract allowed Young full freedom to maintain a parallel career with his new band, Crazy Horse.

They initially completed the rhythm section with former Buffalo Springfield bassist Bruce Palmer. However, Palmer was let go due to his persistent personal problems following rehearsals at the Cafe au Go Go in New York City's Greenwich Village; according to Crosby, "Bruce Palmer was into another instrument and his head was not where it should have been." Teenaged Motown session bassist Greg Reeves joined in Palmer's place at the recommendation of Rick James, a friend and former bandmate of Neil Young.

The now expanded group embarked on a four-leg, 39-date tour that ended with three European concerts in January 1970. Their first major public gig was on August 16, 1969, at the Auditorium Theatre in Chicago, with Joni Mitchell as their opening act. They mentioned they were going to someplace called Woodstock the next day, but that they had no idea where it was. Their one-hour show at the Woodstock Festival in the early morning of August 18, 1969, was a baptism by fire. The crowd of industry friends looking on from offstage was intimidating and prompted Stills to say, "This is the second time we've ever played in front of people, man. We're scared shitless." Their appearance at the festival and in the subsequent movie Woodstock, along with recording the Joni Mitchell song memorializing Woodstock, boosted the visibility of the quartet. CSNY appeared at other prominent festivals that year. Footage from two performances from the Big Sur Folk Festival (held on the grounds of the Esalen Institute on September 13–14, 1969) appears in the movie Celebration at Big Sur. They also appeared at the violence-plagued Altamont Free Concert on December 6, 1969, alongside Santana, Jefferson Airplane, the Flying Burrito Brothers, and the headlining Rolling Stones. During Crosby, Stills, Nash & Young's set, Stills was reported to be repeatedly stabbed in the leg by a "stoned-out" Hells Angel, with a sharpened bicycle spoke. At the band's request, their performance was not included in the subsequent film Gimme Shelter (1970).

Great anticipation had built for the expanded supergroup and their first album with Young, Déjà Vu, which arrived in stores in March 1970. It topped the charts during a 97-week stay in the United States and generated three hit singles, including the Stills-sung cover of Mitchell's "Woodstock" (#11) and both of Nash's contributions ("Teach Your Children" [#16] and "Our House" [#30]). Certified septuple platinum by RIAA, the album's domestic sales currently sit at over 8 million copies; as of 2017, it remains the highest-selling album of each member's career. Déjà Vu was also the first release on the Atlantic Records SD-7200 "superstar" line, created by the label for its highest-profile artists; subsequent solo albums by Crosby, Stills, and Nash were the next releases in this series.

In consultation with other band members, Stills fired Reeves from the group shortly before the beginning of their second American tour in April 1970 "because [he] suddenly decided he was an Apache witch doctor." He further opined that "[Reeves] freaked too much on the bass and no one could keep up because [he] did not play one rhythm the same… he could play bass imaginatively, but he has to be predictable as well," while "Greg also wanted to sing some of his songs on the CSN&Y show, which I thought was ludicrous, only because the songs weren't great. We'll sing any song if it's great, but not just because it happens to be written by our bass player." He was replaced by Calvin "Fuzzy" Samuels, a homeless West Indian musician recently discovered by Stills at Island Records' London studios. Shortly thereafter, Taylor (who frequently clashed with Young over the band's tempos during the first tour and Déjà Vu sessions) was also dismissed when Young threatened to leave the group following the first performance of the tour at the Denver Coliseum on May 12, 1970. Notwithstanding these previous tensions, Taylor later asserted that his dismissal stemmed from a flirtation with Young's first wife (Topanga Canyon restaurateur Susan Acevedo) amid renewed conflict between Stills and Young in the aftermath of Reeves' firing. Shortly thereafter, drummer John Barbata (formerly of The Turtles) was hired for the remainder of the tour and associated recordings.

A week before the Denver performance, Young and Crosby were staying at a house near San Francisco when reports of the Kent State shootings arrived, inspiring Young to write the protest song "Ohio". Recorded and rush-released weeks later with the new rhythm section, it peaked at No. 14 in August 1970, providing another American Top 20 hit for the group. Their previously recorded song "Teach Your Children" was still climbing the chart, yet the group insisted that it be rushed to release. Crosby later stated in an interview that his callbacks "how many more?" in the final stages of the song was ad-libbed, bringing out his pure frustration.

As the 23-show tour progressed, the tenuous nature of the partnership was strained by Stills's alcohol and cocaine abuse, culminating in an extended solo set not countenanced by the other band members at the Fillmore East, when he was informed that Bob Dylan was in the audience. In this turbulent atmosphere, Crosby, Nash and Young decided to quit the tour during a two-night return engagement at Chicago's Auditorium Theatre in July 1970. Singer Rita Coolidge had been romantically involved with Stills, and her leaving him for Nash has also been cited as a contributing factor behind the breakup of the band. Concert recordings from that tour assembled by Nash produced the 1971 double album 4 Way Street, which also topped the charts during a 42-week stay. Although they continued to collaborate in various and largely ephemeral permutations, the four members did not come back together in earnest until their 1974 reunion tour.

=== Individual activity ===
Between September 1970 and May 1971, each of the quartet released high-profile solo albums: Young's After the Gold Rush in September (which peaked at No. 8 and included his first Top 40 solo hit, "Only Love Can Break Your Heart" [#33]); Stills's eponymous debut in November; Crosby's If I Could Only Remember My Name in February, and Nash's Songs for Beginners in May. Although all four solo LPs placed in the Top 15 on the Billboard 200, Stills's entry (including two Top 40 hits, "Love the One You're With" [#14] and "Sit Yourself Down" [#37]) peaked the highest at No. 3. Stills was the first to release a second post-CSNY solo album, 1971's Stephen Stills 2, which included two minor hits ("Change Partners" [#43]; "Marianne" [#42]) and peaked at No. 8. He supported this with a solo tour of major arenas (such as Madison Square Garden and the L.A. Forum) in the summer of 1971 with Dallas Taylor, Fuzzy Samuels, and the Memphis Horns. In the fall of 1971, Crosby and Nash embarked on a successful theater tour accompanied only by their acoustic guitars and a piano, as captured on the 1998 archival release Another Stoney Evening.

1972 proved to be another fruitful year for all the band members in their solo or duo efforts. Young achieved solo superstardom with the chart-topping Harvest and two Top 40 singles, the #1 hit "Heart of Gold" and "Old Man" (#31). Stills joined with former Byrd Chris Hillman to form the band Manassas, releasing a self-titled double album; although it did not generate any significant hits, counting the three CSN/CSNY records, Manassas became Stills's sixth Top Ten album in a row, peaking at No. 4 and being certified gold in the US a month after release. Nash and Young released Young's "War Song" as a joint single to support George McGovern's presidential campaign; despite their intentions, the single failed to make a serious impression. Meanwhile, Nash's and Crosby's touring was so successful and pleasant for them that they recorded and released their first album as a duo, Graham Nash David Crosby, which eclipsed their recent solo efforts with a Top 40 hit (Nash's "Immigration Man", #36); it peaked at No. 4 and was certified gold in the US.

The group members fared less well in 1973. Young recorded two dark albums. The first, Time Fades Away, chronicled his winter tour that followed the death of his Crazy Horse bandmate Danny Whitten from an alcohol/Valium overdose, a tour Crosby and Nash joined mid-way. A critical success despite his personal misgivings, it attained a RIAA gold certification before stalling at No. 22. The second album, Tonight's the Night, inspired by the death of CSNY roadie Bruce Berry, was so dark that Reprise Records refused to release it until 1975, though it was critically acclaimed, it only reached No. 25. Crosby spearheaded and produced a reunion album of the original Byrds quintet which was a notable critical failure upon its release in March 1973. The most commercially successful Byrds album since 1966, it sold only marginally well by CSNY's standards, peaking at No. 20. Stills released a second Manassas record in April 1973 and Nash recorded his second solo album Wild Tales (released in January 1974); again, neither disc sold to expectations, peaking respectively at No. 26 and No. 34. Apart from Time Fades Away, none of the CSNY-related albums in 1973 were certified gold in the US, a first for the band.

=== CSNY, reconciliation and further estrangement: 1973–1976 ===
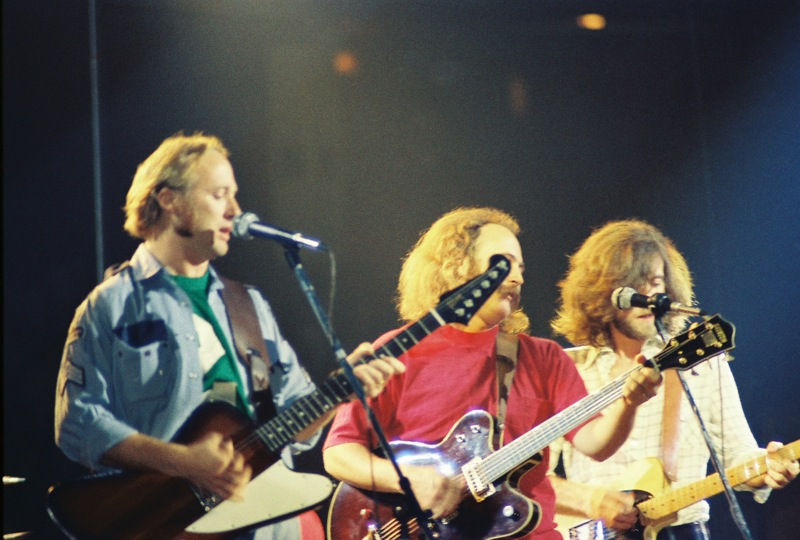
Stills (left), Crosby and Nash in August 1974

In June and July 1973, Crosby, Stills, Nash and Young met at Young's ranch in California and a recording studio in Hawaii for a working vacation, ostensibly to record a new album, tentatively titled Human Highway. However, the bickering that had sunk the band in 1970 quickly resumed, scattering the group again. After spontaneously reconvening for an acoustic set at a Manassas concert at San Francisco's Winterland Ballroom in October, the quartet failed once again to commit to a reunion; however, three days later, the CSN configuration performed an acoustic set at another Manassas Winterland show. Over the next few months, Roberts finally prevailed upon the group to realize their commercial potential, culminating in Stills announcing a CSNY summer tour and the projected studio album at a solo concert in March 1974. The quartet reassembled in earnest that summer, with sidemen Tim Drummond on bass, Russ Kunkel on drums, and Joe Lala on percussion, to rehearse at Young's ranch near Woodside, California before embarking on the two-month, 31-date tour.

The tour was directed by San Francisco-based impresario Bill Graham. Opening acts consisted of well known performers, including Joni Mitchell (who occasionally sat in during the acoustic and semi-acoustic interlude that bridged two electric sets), Santana, the Band, the Beach Boys, and Jesse Colin Young. The band typically played up to three and a half hours of old favorites and new songs. Crosby, in particular, was disillusioned by the bombastic nature of the performances, which he collectively dubbed the "Doom Tour": "We had good monitors, but Stephen and Neil were punching well over 100 db from their half stacks. Graham and I simply couldn't do the harmonies when we couldn't hear ourselves. Also, when you play a stadium you almost have to do a Mick Jagger where you wave a sash around and prance about. I can't quite do that. We did what we could, but I don't know how many people in the audience really got it. A lot of them were there for the tunes. When we'd start them, they'd hear the records." Graham Nash's unreleased film of the Wembley Stadium show highlights the scope and quality of these performances. They opted at the time not to release any recordings of the tour for an album, with Nash maintaining that "[the] main feeling at the end of the tour was that we weren't as good as we could have been." (Decades later, to mark the tour's 40th anniversary in 2014, Nash and archivist Joel Bernstein selected songs from the five shows that had been properly recorded and released CSNY 1974.)

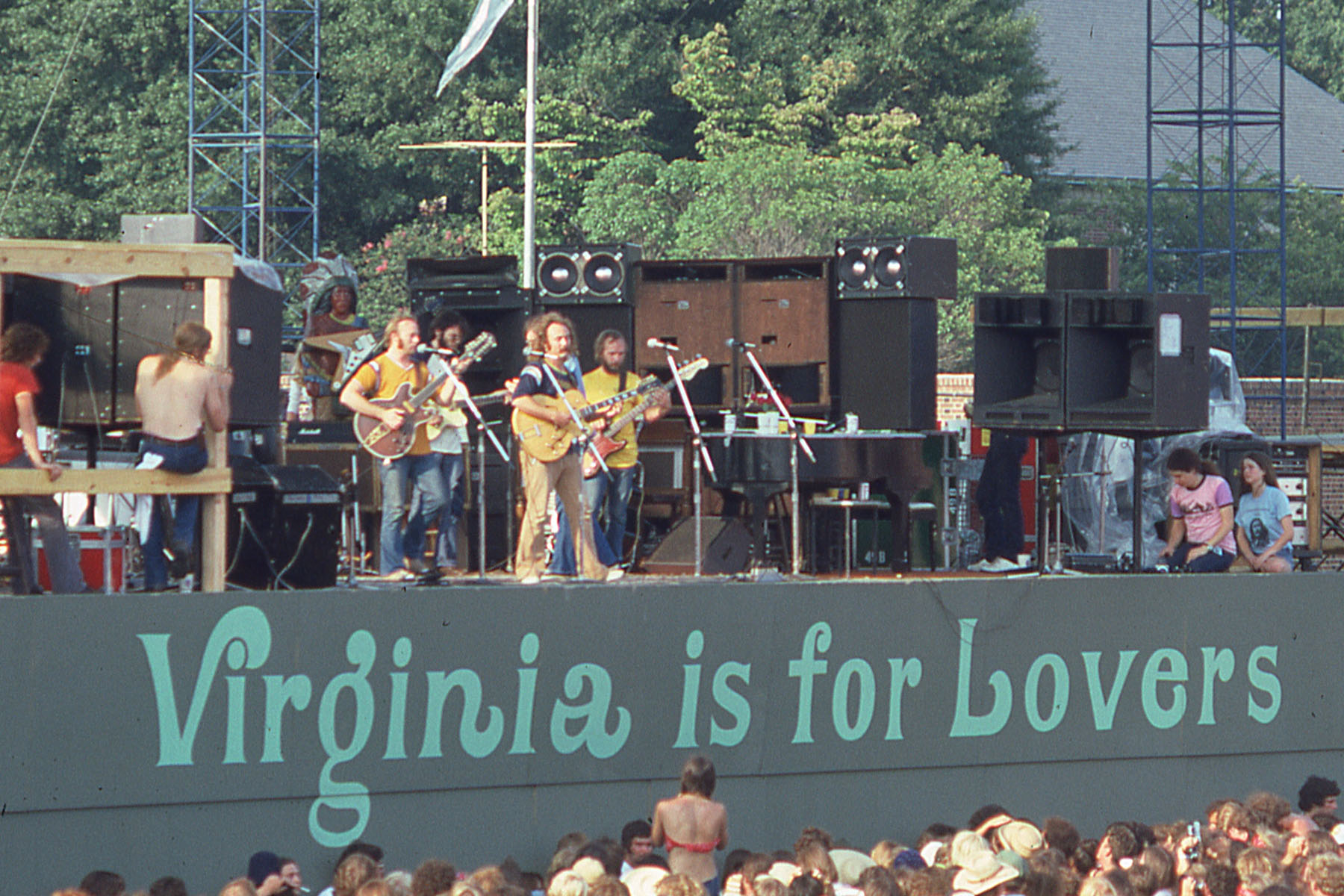
Crosby, Stills & Young outdoor stadium tour at Foreman Field, Old Dominion University, Norfolk VA. (August 17, 1974)

While the foursome would have the press believe that their characteristic arguments were a thing of the past, excesses typical to the era took their toll. Under the stewardship of Graham's production company, the tour was plagued by profligate spending, exemplified by pillowcases embroidered with the band's new Mitchell-designed logo and the routine chartering of helicopters and private jets in lieu of ground transportation. Nash later recalled that "the tour made just over eleven million dollars, which of course was a lot of money in those days. We all got less than a half million each. It was obvious that between Bill Graham, the promoters and a bunch of others, they all had a good time. Let's just put it that way." According to road manager Chris O'Dell, "One time they spilled cocaine on the carpet. They just got down on the floor and sniffed it off the carpet. I just went, 'Oh my God, this is so weird.' I'd never seen anything like it. They probably don't remember that." The relatively abstemious Nash "started taking Percocet and Percodan. I call them 'I Don't Give A Shit' pills. Someone could have said to me, 'Hey, your leg's on fire.' I would have been like, 'I don't care, man.' We were just up all night. It was insane. I wouldn't recommend it to anybody because the cocaine/quaalude ride should be in the ride of horrors in the circus."

Stills—who befuddled his colleagues by claiming to have participated in clandestine Vietnam War missions as a member of the United States Marine Corps during his tenure in Buffalo Springfield—began supplementing his trademark wardrobe of football jerseys with military fatigues while performing and fraternizing with his personal manager, Green Berets veteran Michael John Bowen. Having embraced a promiscuous lifestyle following the death of his girlfriend Christine Hinton several years earlier, Crosby was accompanied by two girlfriends (including future domestic partner Nancy Brown, who turned 18 during the tour) in lieu of Debbie Donovan, his nominal domestic partner at the time. This chagrined several employees and band members; according to Nash, "Often I would knock on his hotel door, which he kept propped open with a security jamb, and he'd be getting blown by both of those girls, all while he was talking and doing business on the phone and rolling joints and smoking and having a drink. Crosby had incredible sexual energy. It got to be such a routine scene in his room, I'd stop by with someone and go, "Aw, fuck, he's getting blown again. Oh, dear, let's give him a minute."

Although each member performed new songs that later appeared on solo and duo studio releases, Young premiered more than a dozen songs (including several from On The Beach, which was released during the tour) in one of the most creatively fertile phases of his career. Vexed by the diminished prolificacy of the trio, he isolated himself from the group, travelling separately in an RV with his son and entourage. He later asserted to biographer Jimmy McDonough that "the tour was disappointing to me. I think CSN really blew it... they hadn't made an album, and they didn't have any songs. How could they just stop like that?" Atlantic Records issued the compilation So Far to have something to promote during the tour. While Nash viewed the re-shuffling of items from only two albums and one single (typified by the exclusion of his "Marrakesh Express", a Top 40 hit) as absurd, it eventually topped the Billboard album chart in November.

Surmounting Young's interpersonal distance and new ebbs in their relationships with Stills, the quartet reconvened with The Albert Brothers at Rudy Records (Nash's San Francisco home studio) in November to finish the long-gestating follow-up to Déjà Vu. Renewed tensions were exacerbated by the relatively incommodious basement space, prompting the group to soon relocate to the Record Plant in nearby Sausalito, California. While several songs were completed and recorded (including Young's "Human Highway"; a take of Crosby's "Homeward Through the Haze" with the singer-songwriter on piano and Lee Sklar on bass; and Nash's anti-whaling opus "Wind on the Water"), Young left once again following a tumultuous argument. As the remaining members (augmented by a variety of session musicians, including Sklar and Kunkel) attempted to complete the album under the CSN name, the feud between Stills and Nash resurfaced, resulting in Stills destroying the master of "Wind on the Water" with a razor blade after Crosby and Nash objected to a harmony part on Stills's "Guardian Angel". Even though Stills characterized the incident as a joke, the sessions promptly dissolved.

Shortly thereafter, Crosby and Nash signed a separate contract with ABC Records and began to tour regularly again, playing a more intimate array of sports arenas, outdoor festivals and theaters. During this period they produced two studio albums, Wind on the Water (No. 6) in 1975 and Whistling Down the Wire (No. 26) in 1976 (both being certified gold in the US), and the 1977 concert album Crosby-Nash Live (No. 52). Along with Drummond (retained from the 1974 CSNY tour), they continued to use the sidemen from the ensemble known as The Section from their first LP. This crack session group (wryly rechristened The Mighty Jitters by Crosby in a nod to the era's endemic cocaine use) contributed to records by myriad other Los Angeles-based artists in the seventies, such as Carole King, James Taylor, and Jackson Browne. Throughout the mid-70s, Crosby and Nash also lent their harmonies to a range of recordings, including Taylor's "Mexico", Joni Mitchell's "Free Man in Paris" and Elton John's Blue Moves.

Meanwhile, Stills and Young returned to their own careers. Stills released an eponymous album in June 1975 (No. 19), a live album in December 1975 (Stephen Stills Live, No. 42) and in May 1976 another studio album (Illegal Stills, No. 31). Young, in 1975, belatedly released Tonight's the Night at the recommendation of Band bassist/vocalist Rick Danko (No. 25) and thence Zuma (No. 25), a new album primarily recorded with Crazy Horse that also featured one song recorded by CSNY in the June 1974 sessions. None of these solo albums initially attained RIAA certification in the United States, although Zuma was ultimately certified gold in 1997. Following the lead of Crosby and Nash, they briefly united for a one-off album and tour credited to the Stills-Young Band, Long May You Run (1976, No. 26), which was certified gold in 1977. Although the Miami-based sessions for this album briefly metamorphosed into the third attempt at a CSNY reunion album, Stills and Young wiped the vocal contributions of the other pair off the master tape when Crosby & Nash were obligated to leave the sessions to finish Whistling Down the Wire in Los Angeles. As Stills and Young embarked on a tour to promote the album in the summer of 1976, the old tensions between the pair resurfaced, exemplified by Stills's insistence that professional studio musicians back them rather than Young's preferred Crazy Horse. After a July 20, 1976, show in Columbia, South Carolina, Young's tour bus took a different direction from Stills'. Waiting at their next stop in Atlanta, Stills received a laconic telegram: "Dear Stephen, Funny how things that start spontaneously end that way. Eat a peach. Neil." Young's management claimed that he was under doctor's orders to rest and recover from an apparent throat infection, though he made up dates with Crazy Horse later in the year. Stills was contractually bound to finish the tour alone.

=== CSN reform: 1976–1985 ===
Later in 1976, Stills approached Crosby and Nash during a performance at the Greek Theatre in Los Angeles, setting the stage for the return of the trio.

Less than a year after reforming, Crosby, Stills & Nash released CSN. Recorded at Criteria Studios in Miami under the aegis of Ron and Howard Albert throughout late 1976 and early 1977, the album exemplified the meticulously stylized soft rock production ethos of the epoch and contained the band's highest-charting single, Nash's "Just a Song Before I Go" (#7); Stills's "Fair Game" also peaked at #43. The album peaked at No. 2 on the Billboard chart in the summer of 1977 during a 33-week stay, remaining at that position for the month of August (behind one of the best-selling LPs of all time, Fleetwood Mac's Rumours) and ultimately earning a RIAA quadruple platinum certification. As of 2017, it remains the trio configuration's best-selling album, outselling their debut by 200,000 records.

On June 21, 1978, Crosby, Stills & Nash received a star on the Hollywood Walk of Fame for their contributions to the music industry, located at 6666 Hollywood Boulevard.

After successful arena tours in 1977 and 1978, further work as a group was complicated by Crosby's newfound dependence on freebase cocaine. Earth & Sky, a 1980 Nash album that failed to chart in the Top 100, was envisaged as a Crosby & Nash project (itself spawned by aborted 1978 CSN sessions) until Nash determined that Crosby was not in shape to participate after his colleague stopped a jam because his freebase pipe had fallen off of an amp and broken.

Juxtaposing recent disco-inflected material (including the Andy Gibb showcase "What's the Game" and "Can't Get No Booty", co-written with Danny Kortchmar during a lull in the 1978 CSN sessions) against more conventional acoustic and blues rock arrangements (such as the Manassas-era title track), Stills's Thoroughfare Gap stalled at No. 83 following its release in October 1978. Stills's 1979 support tour with the California Blues Band (including a performance at the historic Havana Jam) was dominated by theater bookings and largely overshadowed by such tabloid-friendly stories as a brawl with Elvis Costello (instigated by the younger singer-songwriter's use of the word nigger in deprecatory assessments of James Brown and Ray Charles) amid his brief engagement to television actress Susan Saint James, reflecting his diminished critical and commercial stature. The tour's opening concerts at the Roxy Theatre in Los Angeles marked Stills's final full performances with onetime key collaborator Dallas Taylor, by then long addicted to heroin and cocaine. After entering recovery in 1985, Taylor worked as an interventionist and sober companion until his death in 2015.

With little recourse and a rapport that still evinced strain from the Rita Coolidge affair, Stills and Nash convened in 1980–1981 to record Daylight Again as a self-funded duo; however, Atlantic Records executives (led by Ahmet Ertegun, who seldom intervened in the band's affairs) refused to reimburse their expenses or release the LP until Crosby was reinstated. Crosby contributed "Delta" (his last original composition for several years) and a cover of Judy Henske's and Craig Doerge's "Might as Well Have a Good Time" along with some additional vocals on other tracks. Despite Crosby's condition and the relatively démodé nature of the group in the wake of the ascendancy of new wave and contemporary R&B, Daylight Again reached No. 8 in 1982 during a 41-week chart stay. The album contained two major hits: Nash's "Wasted on the Way" (#9) and Stills's "Southern Cross" (#18); Stills's "Too Much Love to Hide" also charted at #69. While the album ultimately failed to sell as well as its predecessors in the new musical climate, it received a RIAA platinum certification in early 1983.

Although the success of Daylight Again inaugurated a new tradition of near-annual touring that persisted for over thirty years, the bottom soon fell out for Crosby, who was arrested and jailed on drug and weapons charges in Texas in May 1982. Having recorded a potential title song for the film WarGames that was never used, the band released it as a single and hastily assembled concert recordings around two studio tracks for the album Allies, their lowest-charting record to date. Crosby was sentenced to two terms, but the conviction was overturned; arrested several more times, he finally turned himself in to the authorities in December 1985. He spent eight months in prison.

=== CSNY again: 1988–2015 ===
Based on a promise he made to Crosby should he clean himself up, Young agreed to rejoin the trio in the studio upon Crosby's release from prison for American Dream in 1988. Stills and Crosby (enfeebled by health problems from his fallow period that culminated in a 1994 liver transplant) were barely functioning for the making of the album, and the late eighties production completely swamped the band. It did make it to No. 16 on the Billboard chart during a 22-week stay, but the record received poor critical notices, and Young refused to support it with a CSNY tour. The band did produce a video for Young's title-song single, wherein each member played a character loosely based on certain aspects of their personalities and public image. Several years later, CSNY reunited to play the Bill Graham memorial concert ("Laughter, Love and Music") at Golden Gate Park in San Francisco on November 3, 1991.

CSN recorded two more studio albums in the 1990s, Live It Up (1990) and After the Storm (1994); both albums sold poorly by previous standards and failed to attain RIAA certifications. A box set arrived in 1991, four discs of expected group highlights amidst unexpected better tracks from various solo projects. Owing to certain difficulties, manager Roberts, no longer with the trio but still representing Young, pulled most of Young's material earmarked for the box. Ultimately, nineteen tracks out of the seventy-seven in the set were credited to CSNY. Intended for inclusion, the 1976 CSNY version of "Human Highway" was leaked to the internet several years later before receiving an official release on the Neil Young Archives Volume II: 1972–1976 box set in 2020.

In 1994, CSN collaborated with Suzy Bogguss, Alison Krauss, and Kathy Mattea to contribute "Teach Your Children" to the AIDS benefit album Red Hot + Country produced by the Red Hot Organization.

By the late 1990s, CSN found themselves without a record contract. They began financing recordings themselves, and in 1999 Stills invited Young to guest on a few tracks. Impressed by their gumption, Young increased his level of input, turning the album into a CSNY project, Looking Forward. The album was released at Young's behest via Reprise Records in October 1999. With writing credits mostly limited to band members, the disc was better received than the previous three albums from a critical standpoint. It also fared relatively well commercially, peaking at No. 26 (the group's highest chart placement since American Dream) during a 9-week stay. However, in a reflection of the shifting financial landscape of the music industry, Looking Forward was most notable for laying the groundwork for the ensuing CSNY2K Tour (2000) and the CSNY Tour of America (2002), both of which were major money-makers.

CSN were inducted into the Rock and Roll Hall of Fame in 1997; CSNY is the first band to have all its members inducted into the hall twice, although Young was inducted for his solo work (1995) and for Buffalo Springfield (1997). A year later, in 1998, CSN were inducted into the Vocal Group Hall of Fame. The CSN logo that Crosby, Stills and Nash used from the mid-1970s onward was designed by actor and comedian Phil Hartman during his first career as a graphic designer. Hartman later on revealed that he was never credited for his design of the logo, though he wasn't bitter about it but rather found it 'amusing'.

Various compilations of the band's configurations have arrived over the years, the box set being the most comprehensive, and So Far being the most commercially successful. Individual retrospective box sets have also been released. In 2007, David Crosby's Voyage chronicled his work with various bands and as a solo artist. Graham Nash's Reflections appeared in early 2009 under the same auspices, quite near his 67th birthday. The box set for Stephen Stills, Carry On, was released in February 2013. Compilation and oversight of these releases has largely been managed by Nash.

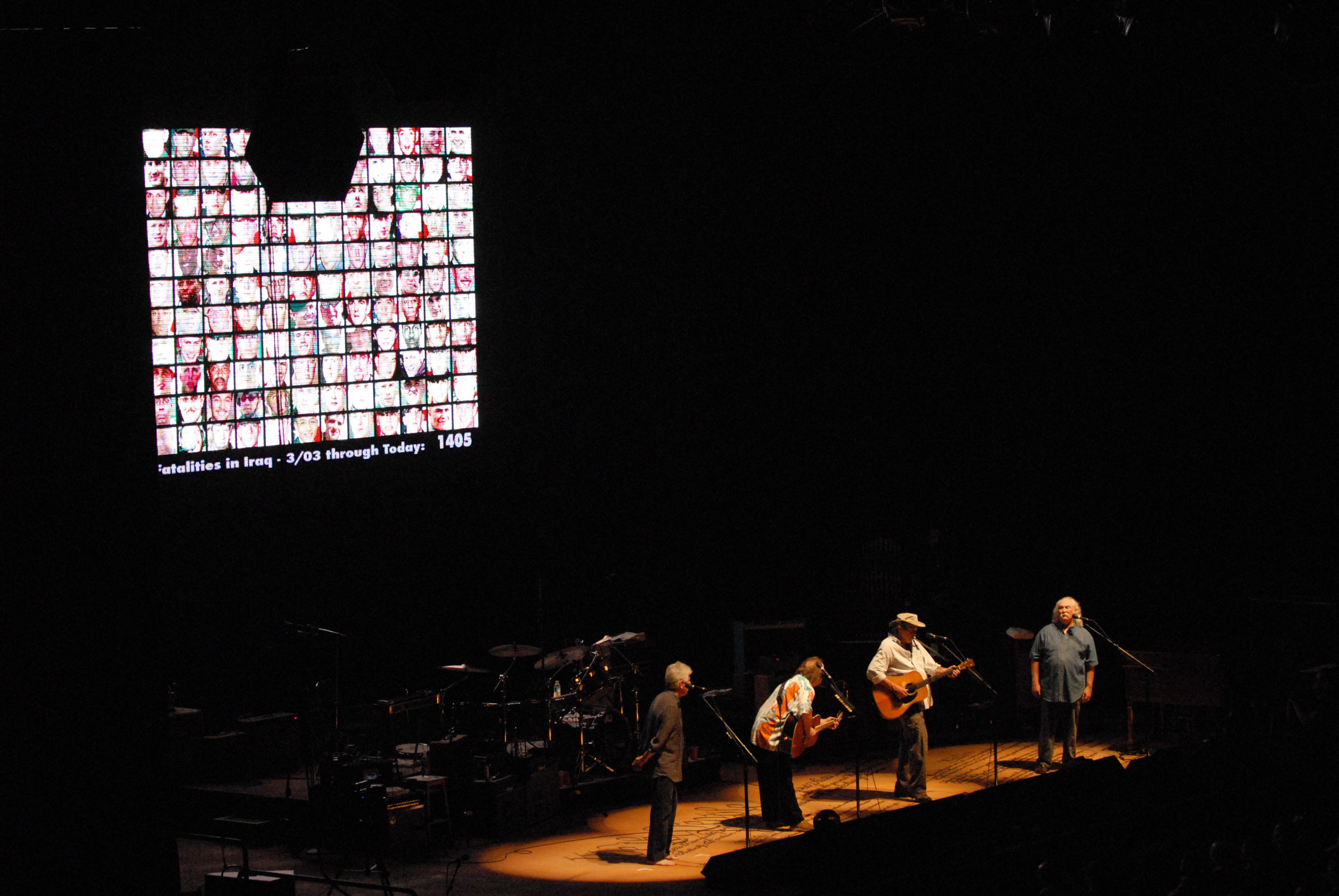
One of the backdrops during the 2006 "Freedom of Speech" tour, as shown here, was the photos of American soldiers who had died in the war in Iraq.

In 2006, Crosby, Stills, Nash and Young set off on their Freedom of Speech Tour in support of Living with War, a Young solo album written in response to the Iraq War. The long setlists included the bulk of the new protest album as well as material from Stills's long-delayed solo album Man Alive! and recent material from Crosby and Nash. On May 16, 2006, Crosby, Stills & Nash were honored as a BMI Icon at the 54th annual BMI Pop Awards. They were honored for their "unique and indelible influence on generations of music makers." In February 2007, CSN were forced to postpone a tour of Australia and New Zealand due to David Crosby's illness. Also in 2006, long-time manager Gerry Tolman died in a car accident.

The trio performed "Teach Your Children" on The Colbert Report on July 30, 2008, with host Stephen Colbert filling in the fourth harmony (Neil Young's portion) and wearing a Young-mocking outfit and being referred to by Nash as "Neil". In 2009, Crosby, Stills & Nash released Demos, an album made up of demo recordings of popular group and solo songs. In June 2009 Crosby, Stills and Nash performed at the Glastonbury Festival. Stephen Stills was praised for his exceptional guitar playing. Neil Young did not appear onstage with them but did perform as a solo artist. In July 2009, they headlined the 14th annual Gathering of the Vibes festival. Halfway through their set, they enthusiastically announced to the crowd that they would be back next year.

CSN convened with producer Rick Rubin to record a projected covers album (tentatively titled Songs We Wish We'd Written) for Sony Music Entertainment in 2010; seven songs were completed before the dissolution of the sessions due to the increasingly acrimonious relationship between Rubin and Crosby, who perceived the former as a disruptive and autocratic figure in the creative process. By 2012, CSN had completed five self-produced re-recordings in anticipation of a potential rights dispute over the Rubin sessions with Sony.

Crosby, Stills & Nash toured the United States, Australia, New Zealand and Brazil in 2012 and released a 2CD/DVD entitled CSN 2012 on July 17, 2012. Further tours of the United States and Europe followed in 2013 and 2014.

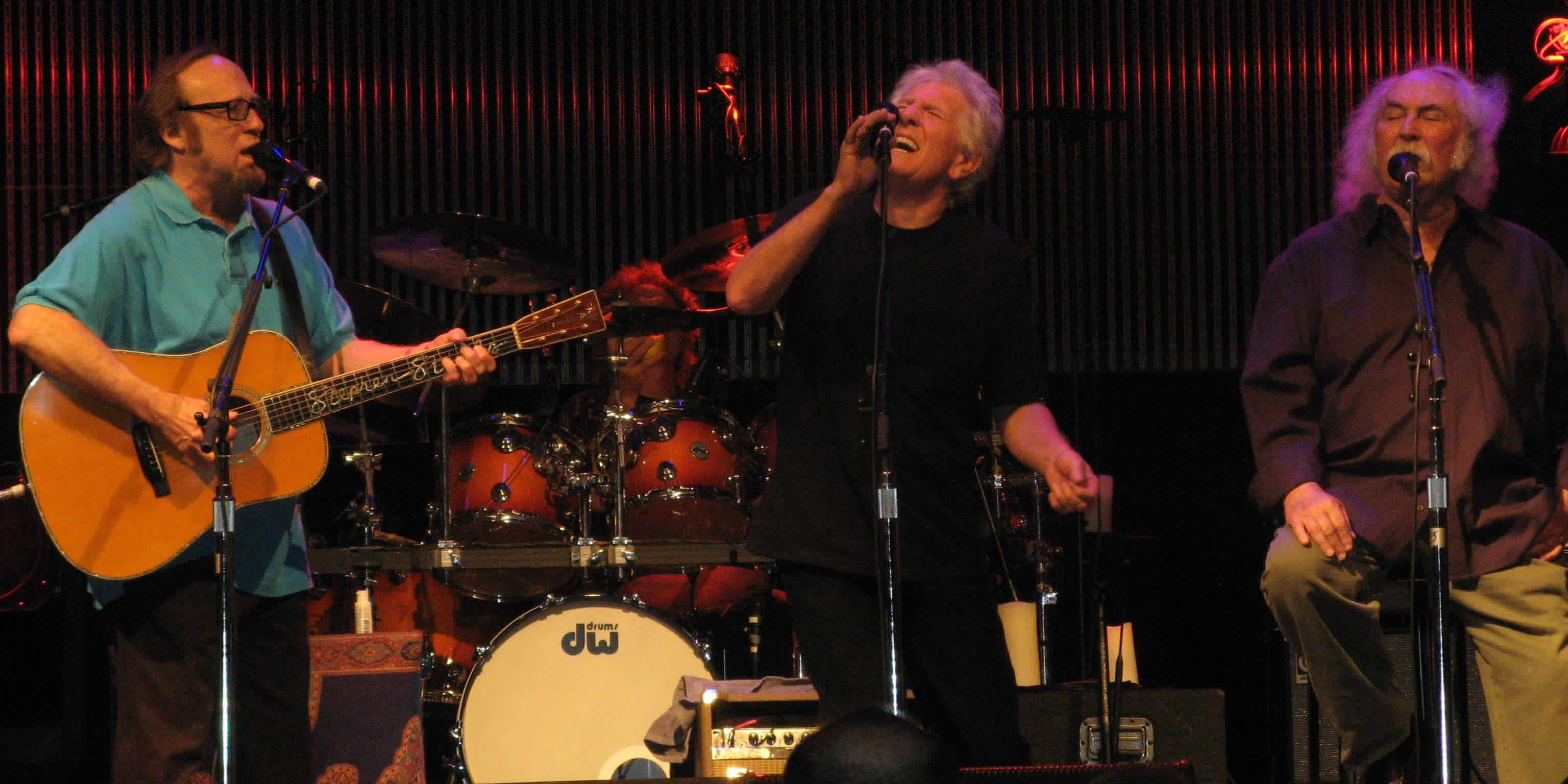
CSN in 2010

Crosby, Stills, Nash and Young performed an acoustic set at the 27th Bridge School Benefit on October 27, 2013 which was that configuration's final concert. CSNY 1974, an anthology culled from hitherto unreleased recordings of the 1974 tour by Nash and longtime band archivist Joel Bernstein, was released by Rhino Records on July 8, 2014 to widespread critical acclaim. In a September 2014 interview with the Idaho Statesman, Crosby dispelled rumors of another CSNY tour (citing Neil Young's general unwillingness and lack of financial incentive to perform with the ensemble) before characterizing Young's new partner Daryl Hannah as "a purely poisonous predator." While introducing a song during a solo performance at the Philadelphia Academy of Music on October 8, 2014, Young announced that "CSNY will never tour again, ever...but I love those guys." Two days later, Crosby confirmed that "[Young] is very angry with me," and likened Young's remarks to "saying there are mountains in Tibet." Crosby made further comments, including that he apologized on Twitter. On May 18, 2015, Crosby apologized publicly to Hannah and Young on The Howard Stern Show, saying "I'm screwed up way worse than that girl. Where do I get off criticizing her? She's making Neil happy. I love Neil and I want him happy," and "Daryl, if you're out there, I apologize. Where do I get off criticizing you? There are people I can criticize: politicians, pond scum. Not other artists that have gone through a hard life, same as me. She hasn't had it easy either."

=== CSN breakup and Crosby's death: 2016–present ===
Despite the unprecedented tumult between Crosby and Young, CSN embarked on a routine world tour encompassing American, European and Japanese venues in 2015, culminating in a performance of "Silent Night" at the National Christmas Tree lighting ceremony at The Ellipse in Washington, D.C., on December 3, 2015. However, contrary to a previous November 2015 interview in which he stated he still hoped the band had a future, Nash announced on March 6, 2016, following his divorce from his wife of 38 years, Susan Sennett, that Crosby, Stills & Nash would never perform again because of his recent estrangement from Crosby. In the summer of 2016, Young told Rolling Stone that he wouldn't "rule out" future collaborations with the trio; according to Nash in a follow-up interview, "Well, he's right, you never know. There have been times when I've been so pissed at us all for wasting time and not getting on with the job that I wouldn't talk to any of them. But if Crosby came and played me four songs that knocked me on my ass, what the fuck am I supposed to do as a musician, no matter how pissed we are at each other?"

Young echoed these sentiments in a January 2017 interview: "I think CSNY has every chance of getting together again. I'm not against it. There's been a lot of bad things happen[ing] among us, and a lot of things have to be settled. But that's what brothers and families are all about. We'll see what happens. I'm open. I don't think I'm a major obstacle." When queried about Young and the interview on Twitter shortly thereafter, Crosby said that Young is "a hugely talented guy" and a prospective reunion would be "fine with me." In April 2017, Nash framed the potential reunion in the context of the group's tradition of political activism amid the presidency of Donald Trump: "I believe that the issues that are keeping us apart pale in comparison to the good that we can do if we get out there and start talking about what's happening. So I'd be totally up for it even though I'm not talking to David and neither is Neil. But I think that we're smart people in the end and I think we realize the good that we can do." In a May 2021 interview for CBS News Sunday Morning, Nash said "when that silver thread that connects a band gets broken it's very difficult to glue the ends together." He nonetheless suggested that reuniting with Crosby and the others would be preferable "because of the loss of the music."

On January 18, 2023, David Crosby died at 81, ending any possibilities of a full reunion.

== Political activism ==
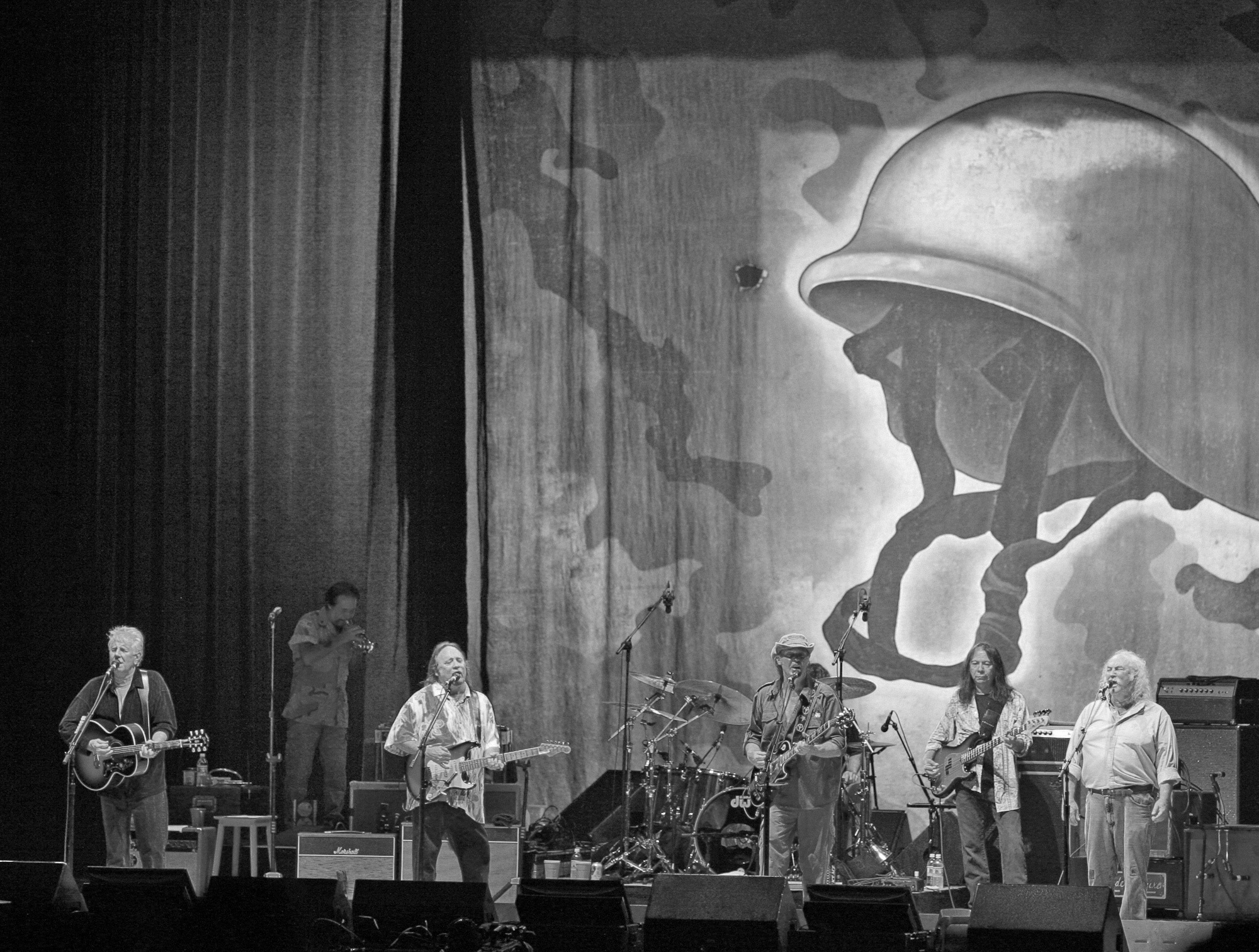
CSNY during their 2006 tour; L to R: Graham Nash, Tom Bray, Stephen Stills, Neil Young, Rick Rosas, and David Crosby

CSNY's music reflected the tastes and viewpoints of the counterculture in the late 1960s and early 1970s. With protest against the Vietnam War gearing up in 1970, the group (and Crosby in particular) made no secret of their political leanings.

As a group, they recorded one hit song in response to political events although they recorded other political songs as solo artists and in various combinations. The song, "Ohio", was written in response to the deaths of four students at Kent State University. The students were shot by Ohio National Guardsmen during an anti-war protest on the campus in May 1970.

Between "Ohio", their appearance in both the festival and movie of Woodstock, and the runaway success of their two albums, the group found themselves in the position of enjoying a level of adulation far greater than experienced with their previous bands, as evidenced by the 27 Platinum certifications they received across seven albums.

The band has been continuously associated with political causes throughout its existence, the latest example being the song "Almost Gone (The Ballad of Bradley Manning)" which focuses on the length and conditions of Chelsea Manning's pre-trial confinement.

Crosby, Nash, and Young were all vocal in their support for 2016 Democratic Presidential candidate Bernie Sanders.

== Legacy and influence ==
Allison Rapp of Ultimate Classic Rock conferred the title of the "folk rockiest of all the folk rock bands" on Crosby, Stills, Nash & Young.

The band's collective abilities allowed CSNY to straddle all the genres of popular music eminent at the time, from country rock to confessional ballads, from acoustic guitars and voice to electric guitar, and three-part harmony. With the Beatles' break-up made public by April 1970, and with Bob Dylan in reclusive low-key activity since mid-1966, CSNY found themselves the adopted standard bearers for the Woodstock Nation, serving an importance in society as counterculture figureheads, equaled at the time in rock and roll only by the Rolling Stones or the Who. Such was their standing in 1970 that Bill Graham referred to them as "The American Beatles". Producer Peter Fonda wanted CSN to create the soundtrack for Easy Rider, but director Dennis Hopper nixed the idea. Stills's composition, "Find the Cost of Freedom" (on the flip side of "Ohio"), was the only song known to be offered for the soundtrack.

== Members ==
=== Official members ===
- David Crosby – lead and backing vocals, rhythm guitar (1968–1970, 1973–2015; died 2023)
- Stephen Stills – lead and backing vocals, lead and rhythm guitar, bass, keyboards, percussion (1968–1970, 1973–2015)
- Graham Nash – lead and backing vocals, keyboards, rhythm guitar (1968–1970, 1973–2015)
- Neil Young – lead and backing vocals, lead and rhythm guitar, keyboards, harmonica (1969–1970, 1973–1974, 1985–1988, 1991, 1999–2006, 2013)

==== Timeline ====
Tour personnel

== Discography ==
For individual discographies, see entries on David Crosby, Stephen Stills, Graham Nash, and Neil Young. See also Crosby & Nash duo discography.

- (CSN) Crosby, Stills & Nash (1969)
- (CSNY) Déjà Vu (1970)
- (CSN) CSN (1977)
- (CSN) Daylight Again (1982)
- (CSNY) American Dream (1988)
- (CSN) Live It Up (1990)
- (CSN) After the Storm (1994)
- (CSNY) Looking Forward (1999)

== Tours ==
- Crosby, Stills, Nash and Young 1969–1970 tours
- CSNY 1974
- CSN 1977 & 1978 Tour
- CSN 1982 & 1983 Tours
- CSN 1980–90's Tours
- List of Crosby, Stills, Nash (& Young) concert tours (2000s–10s)
