= List of Crosby, Stills & Nash concert tours (1980s–90s) =

Crosby, Stills & Nash have toured for five decades. Since 1982 they toured yearly with a few exceptions. Notably in 1986 when David Crosby was serving a prison sentence. Touring has tended to focus on North America, but the band have also played in Europe and other parts of the world.

== 1984 Tour ==
1984 Tour
- United States tour by Crosby, Stills & Nash
- Poster for the concert Albuquerque, USA
- Location: United States
- Start date: June 1, 1984
- End date: December 6, 1984
- Legs: 2
- No. of shows: 68

=== Lineup ===
- David Crosby – guitar, vocals
- Stephen Stills – guitar, keyboards, vocals
- Graham Nash – guitar, keyboards, vocals
- Mike Finnigan – keyboards
- Kim Bullard – keyboards
- Kenny Passarelli (replaced by George "Chocolate" Perry) – bass
- Ian Wallace – drums
- Joe Lala – percussion

=== Dates ===
Tours
Date	City	Country	Venue
Leg 1
June 1, 1984	San Diego	United States	Jack Murphy Stadium
July 29, 1984	Louisville	United States	Louisville Palace Theatre
August 2, 1984	Boston	United States	Boston Common
August 4, 1984	Philadelphia	United States	Mann Music Center
August 5, 1984	Philadelphia	United States	Mann Music Center
August 7, 1984	Holmdel	United States	Garden State Arts Centre
August 8, 1984	Holmdel	United States	Garden State Arts Centre
August 10, 1984	Middletown	United States	Orange County Fairgrounds
August 11, 1984	North Conway	United States	Mount Cranmore Stadium
August 12, 1984	Newbury	United States	Spencer Pierce Little Farm
August 14, 1984	New York City	United States	Pier 84
August 15, 1984	New York City	United States	Pier 84
August 17, 1984	Wantagh	United States	Jones Beach Theatre
August 18, 1984	Niagara Falls	United States	Niagara Falls Convention and Civic Centre
August 19, 1984	Cleveland	United States	Cleveland Stadium
August 21, 1984	Chicago	United States	UIC Pavilion
August 22, 1984	Bristol	United States	Colt State Park
August 23, 1984	St Louis	United States	The Muny
August 24, 1984	Bonner Springs	United States	Sandstone Amphitheatre
August 25, 1984	Denver	United States	Mile High Stadium
August 27, 1984	Houston	United States	The Summit
August 29, 1984	Austin	United States	South Park Meadows
August 30, 1984	Dallas	United States	Park Center Amphitheatre
August 31, 1984	Oklahoma City	United States	Zoo Amphitheatre
September 1, 1984	San Diego	United States	Aztec Bowl
September 3, 1984	Costa Mesa	United States	Pacific Amphitheatre
September 7, 1984	Las Vegas	United States	Circus Maximus at Caesars Palace
September 8, 1984	San Francisco	United States	Candlestick Park
September 9, 1984	Nevada County Fairgrounds CA	United States	Sierra Sun Festival
September 12, 1984	Rochester Hills	United States	Meadow Brook Music Festival
September 13, 1984	Rochester Hills	United States	Meadow Brook Music Festival
September 14, 1984	East Troy	United States	Alpine Valley Music Theatre
September 15, 1984	St Paul	United States	Navy Island
September 17, 1984	Indianapolis	United States	Sports And Media Center
September 18, 1984	Pittsburgh	United States	Civic Arena
September 19, 1984	Hershey	United States	Hersheypark Arena
September 20, 1984	Binghamton	United States	Broome County Veterans Memorial Arena
September 22, 1984	Bristol	United States	Colt State Park
September 23, 1984	Glen Falls	United States	Glen Falls Civic Centre
September 28, 1984	Johnson City	United States	Freedom Hall Civic Center
September 29, 1984	Louisville	United States	Louisville Palace Theater
Leg 2
October 24, 1984	Rochester	United States	Rochester Community War Memorial
October 25, 1984	Erie	United States	Erie Civic Center
October 26, 1984	Dayton	United States	Hara Arena
October 28, 1984	Louisville	United States	Freedom Hall
October 29, 1984	South Bend	United States	Athletics And Covocation Centre
October 30, 1984	Columbus	United States	Battelle Hall
November 1, 1984	Kalamazoo	United States	Wings Stadium
November 2, 1984	Lansing	United States	
November 3, 1984	Champaign	United States	Assembly Hall
November 4, 1984	Iowa City	United States	Iowa Memorial Union Main Lounge
November 8, 1984	Omaha	United States	Omaha Civic Arean
November 9, 1984	Tulsa	United States	
November 10, 1984	Fayatteville	United States	Barnhill Arena
November 12, 1984	Albuquerque	United States	Tingley Coliseum
November 13, 1984	Las Cruces	United States	Corbett Centre Ballroom
November 14, 1984	Tucson	United States	McKale Memorial Centre
November 15, 1984	Tempe	United States	ASU Activity Centre
November 17, 1984	San Bernardino	United States	Orange Pavilion
November 19, 1984	Universal City	United States	Universal Amphitheatre
November 20, 1984	Universal City	United States	Universal Amphitheatre
November 25, 1984	Nevada	United States	University of Reno
November 28, 1984	Caspar	United States	
November 29, 1984	Salt Lake City	United States	Salt Palace
December 1, 1984	Seattle	United States	Seattle Center Coliseum
December 2, 1984	Spokane	United States	Spokane Coliseum
December 4, 1984	Portland	United States	Civic Auditorium
December 6, 1984	Honolulu	United States	Neal S. Blaisdell Arena

== 1985 Tour ==
1985 Tour
- United States tour by Crosby, Stills & Nash
- Location: United States
- Start date: June 28, 1985
- End date: September 30, 1985
- Legs: 2
- No. of shows: 56

=== Lineup ===
- David Crosby – guitar, vocals
- Stephen Stills – guitar, keyboards, vocals
- Graham Nash – guitar, keyboards, vocals
- Mike Finnigan – keyboards
- Kim Bullard (replaced by Craig Doerge) – keyboards
- George "Chocolate" Perry – bass
- Mark T. Williams – drums
- Joe Lala – percussion

=== Dates ===
Tours
Date	City	Country	Venue
Leg 1
June 28, 1985	Sacramento	United States	Cal Expo Amphitheatre
June 29, 1985	Concord	United States	Concord Pavilion
June 30, 1985	Concord	United States	Concord Pavilion
July 2, 1985	Costa Mesa	United States	Pacific Amphitheatre
July 3, 1985	Los Angeles	United States	Greek Theatre
July 4, 1985	Los Angeles	United States	Greek Theatre
July 5, 1985	Las Vegas	United States	Thomas & Mack Centre
July 7, 1985	Park City	United States	Park West
July 9, 1985	Morrison	United States	Red Rocks Amphitheatre
July 10, 1985	Morrison	United States	Red Rocks Amphitheatre
July 12, 1985	Oklahoma City	United States	Zoo Amphitheatre
July 13, 1985	Philadelphia	United States	JFK Stadium - Live Aid As Crosby, Stills, Nash & Young
July 14, 1985	Houston	United States	Southern Star Amphitheatre
July 17, 1985	Bonner Spring	United States	Sandstone Amphitheatre
July 18, 1985	St Louis	United States	Fox Theatre
July 19, 1985	Springfield	United States	Prairie Capital Convention Centre
July 20, 1985	Fort Wayne	United States	Allen County War Memorial Coliseum
July 23, 1985	Toledo	United States	Centennial Hall
July 24, 1985	Cincinnati	United States	Riverbed Music Theatre
July 26, 1985	East Troy	United States	Alpine Valley Music Theatre
July 27, 1985	Clarkston	United States	Pine Knob Music Theatre
July 28, 1985	Clarkston	United States	Pine Knob Music Theatre
July 30, 1985	Hoffman Estates	United States	Poplar Creek Music Theatre
August 1, 1985	Ohio	United States	Blossom Music Center
August 2, 1985	Pittsburgh	United States	Civic Arena
August 3, 1985	Buffalo	United States	Buffalo Memorial Auditorium
August 5, 1985	Columbia	United States	Merriweather Post Pavilion
August 6, 1985	Columbia	United States	Merriweather Post Pavilion
August 7, 1985	Norfolk	United States	Scope Arena
August 9, 1985	Philadelphia	United States	Mann Music Center
August 10, 1985	Philadelphia	United States	Mann Music Center
August 12, 1985	New York City	United States	Pier 84
August 13, 1985	New York City	United States	Pier 84
August 15, 1985	Wantagh	United States	Jones Beach Theater
August 16, 1985	Wantagh	United States	Jones Beach Theater
August 17, 1985	Hartford	United States	Hartford Civic Center
August 19, 1985	Holmdel	United States	Garden State Arts Centre
August 20, 1985	Holmdel	United States	Garden State Arts Centre
August 22, 1985	Bristol	United States	Colt State Park
August 25, 1985	Lewiston	United States	Lewiston Raceway
August 27, 1985	Saratoga	United States	Saratoga Performing Arts Centre
August 28, 1985	Boston	United States	Boston Common
August 29, 1985	Allentown	United States	Allentown Fairgrounds - Great Allentown Fair
August 31, 1985	Richmond	United States	Richmond Coliseum
Leg 2
September 18, 1985	Greensboro	United States	Greensboro Coliseum
September 20, 1985	Atlanta	United States	Chastain Park Amphitheatre
September 21, 1985	Atlanta	United States	Chastain Park Amphitheatre
September 22, 1985	New Orleans	United States	University Of New Orleans Soccer Field
September 24, 1985	Pensacola	United States	Pensacola Civic Center
September 25, 1985	Tallahassee	United States	Tallahassee-Leon Civic Center
September 26, 1985	St Petersberg	United States	Bayfront Center
September 28, 1985	Miami	United States	James L. Knight Civic Center
September 29, 1985	Miami	United States	James L. Knight Civic Center
September 30, 1985	Orlando	United States	Orange County Convention Civic Center

== 1987 Tour ==
1987 Tour
- United States tour by Crosby, Stills & Nash
- Location: United States
- Start date: January 7, 1987
- End date: November 27, 1987
- Legs: 2
- No. of shows: 76

=== Lineup ===
- David Crosby – guitar, vocals
- Stephen Stills – guitar, keyboards, vocals
- Graham Nash – guitar, keyboards, vocals
- Mike Finnigan – keyboards
- Bob Glaub – bass
- Joe Vitale – drums
- Joe Lala – percussion

=== Dates ===
Tours
Date	City	Country	Venue
Leg 1
January 7, 1987	Sunrise	United States	Sunrise Music Theatre
January 8, 1987	Sunrise	United States	Sunrise Music Theatre
January 9, 1987	Daytona Beach	United States	Ocean Center
January 10, 1987	Clearwater	United States	Ruth Eckard Hall 2 Shows
January 15, 1987	Upper Darby	United States	Tower Theatre 2 shows a night
January 16, 1987	Upper Darby	United States	Tower Theatre 2 shows a night
January 17, 1987	Upper Darby	United States	Tower Theatre 2 shows a night
January 18, 1987	Upper Darby	United States	Tower Theatre 2 shows a night
January 20, 1987	Bethlehem	United States	Stabler Arena
January 21, 1987	Boston	United States	Wang Theatre 2 Shows
January 23, 1987	Washington		DAR Constitution Hall 2 Shows
Odd dates
February 6, 1987	Santa Barbara	United States	Arlington Theatre - CSNY Show
June 23, 1987	Burbank	United States	The Tonight Show with Johnny Carson
Leg 2
July 2, 1987	Binghamton	United States	Broome County Veterans Memorial Arena
July 3, 1987	Hershey	United States	Hersheypark Arena
July 4, 1987	Landover	United States	Capital Centre - Welcome Home 1987
July 5, 1987	Columbia	United States	Merriweather Post Pavilion
July 6, 1987	Columbia	United States	Merriweather Post Pavilion
July 7, 1987	New York	United States	Radio City Music Hall
July 8, 1987	New York	United States	Radio City Music Hall
July 10, 1987	Richmond	United States	Richmond Coliseum
July 11, 1987	Charlotte	United States	Charlotte Coliseum
July 13, 1987	Atlanta	United States	The Omni
July 14, 1987	Antioch	United States	Starwood Amphitheatre
July 15, 1987	Pelham	United States	Oak Mountain Amphitheatre
July 17, 1987	Houston	United States	The Summit
July 18, 1987	Dallas	United States	Park Center Amphitheatre - Starfest 1987
July 19, 1987	Oklahoma City	United States	Frontier City
July 21, 1987	Memphis	United States	Mud Island Amphitheatre
July 23, 1987	Louisville	United States	Louisville Gardens
July 24, 1987	Chesterfield	United States	Chesterfield Amphitheatre
July 25, 1987	St Louis	United States	Fox Theatre
July 27, 1987	Morison	United States	Red Rocks Amphitheatre
July 28, 1987	Park West	United States	Park City Mountain Resort
July 30, 1987	Seattle	United States	Seattle Center Coliseum
July 31, 1987	Spokane	United States	Opera House
August 1, 1987	Portland	United States	Portland Memorial Coliseum
August 3, 1987	Sacramento	United States	Cal Expo Amphitheatre
August 4, 1987	Concord	United States	Concord Pavilion
August 5, 1987	Paso Robles	United States	Chumash Grand Stand Arena
August 7, 1987	Mountain View	United States	Shoreline Amphitheatre - CSNY
August 8, 1987	Irvine	United States	Irvine Meadows Amphitheatre
August 14, 1987	Clarkston	United States	Pine Knob Music Theatre
August 15, 1987	Hoffman Estates	United States	Poplar Creek Music Theatre
August 16, 1987	West Park	United States	Wisconsin State Fair
August 18, 1987	Ohio	United States	Blossom Music Centre
August 19, 1987	Columbus	United States	Ohio Theatre
August 20, 1987	Wyoming	United States	Lamar Park
August 22, 1987	Cincinnati	United States	Riverbend Music Center
August 23, 1987	Pittsburgh	United States	Civic Arena
August 24, 1987	New York	United States	Finger Lakes Performing Arts Center
August 25, 1987	New York	United States	Saratoga Performing Arts Centre
August 27, 1987	Philadelphia	United States	Mann Music Center
August 28, 1987	Philadelphia	United States	Mann Music Center
August 29, 1987	Hartford	United States	Hartford Civic Center
August 31, 1987	New York	United States	New York State Fair -
September 1, 1987	Old Orchard Beach	United States	Old Orchard Beach Ballpark
September 4, 1987	East Rutherford	United States	Brendan Bryne Arena
September 5, 1987	Wantagh	United States	Jones Beach Theatre
September 6, 1987	Mansfield	United States	Great Woods Centre
September 7, 1987	Mansfield	United States	Great Woods Centre
September 9, 1987	Huntington	United States	Huntington Civic Center
September 10, 1987	Indianapolis	United States	Sports And Music Center
September 11, 1987	East Troy	United States	Alpine Valley Music Theatre
September 20, 1987	Santa Barbara	United States	Santa Barbara Bowl
September 27, 1987	Oklahoma City	United States	Civic Center Music Hall
Club Date
November 21, 1987	West Hollywood	United States	The Roxy

== 1988 Tour ==
1988 Tour
- United States tour by Crosby, Stills & Nash
- Location: United States
- Start date: August 1, 1988
- End date: November 12, 1988
- Legs: 2
- No. of shows: 38

=== Lineup ===
- David Crosby – guitar, vocals
- Stephen Stills – guitar, keyboards, vocals
- Graham Nash – guitar, keyboards, vocals
- Mike Finnigan – keyboards
- Bob Glaub – bass
- Joe Vitale – drums
- Joe Lala – percussion

=== Dates ===
Date	City	Country	Venue
Odd dates
February 8, 1988	New Orleans	United States	Generation Hall
May 14, 1988	New York	United States	Madison Square Garden - Atlantic Records 40th Anniversary
June 3, 1988	Montreal	Canada	Forum De Montreal
Leg 1
August 1, 1988	Mansfield	United States	Great Woods Center for Performing Arts
August 2, 1988	Mansfield	United States	Great Woods Center for Performing Arts
August 4, 1988	Saratoga	United States	Saratoga Performing Arts Center
August 5, 1988	Bristol	United States	Lake Compounce
August 6, 1988	Wantagh	United States	Jones Beach Theater
August 8, 1988	East Rutherford	United States	Brendan Bryne Arena
August 10, 1988	Philadelphia	United States	Mann Music Centre
August 11, 1988	Philadelphia	United States	Mann Music Centre
August 12, 1988	Columbia	United States	Merriweather Post Pavilion
August 13, 1988	Pittsburgh	United States	AJ Palumbo Centre
August 15, 1988	Cincinnati	United States	Riverbend Music Center
August 16, 1988	Cuyahoga Falls	United States	Blossom Music Center
August 18, 1988	Auburn Hills	United States	The Palace at Auburn Hills
August 19, 1988	Indianapolis	United States	Sports & Music Center
August 20, 1988	East Troy	United States	Alpine Valley Music Theatre
August 22, 1988	La Crosse	United States	La Crosse Center
August 24, 1988	Hoffman Estates	United States	Poplar Creek Music Theatre
August 25, 1988	St Louis	United States	Fox Theatre
August 26, 1988	St Louis	United States	Fox Theatre
August 28, 1988	Colorado	United States	Colorado State Fair Events Center
August 29, 1988	Greenwood Village	United States	Fiddler's Green Amphitheatre
August 30, 1988	Park City	United States	Park West
September 1, 1988	Vancouver	Canada	Pacific Coliseum
September 2, 1988	Tacoma	United States	Tacoma Dome
September 3, 1988	Portland	United States	Portland Memorial Coliseum
September 5, 1988	Mountain View	United States	Shoreline Amphitheatre
September 6, 1988	Santa Barbara	United States	Santa Barbara Bowl
September 8, 1988	Tempe	United States	ASU Activity Center
September 9, 1988	San Diego	United States	SDSU Open Air Theatre
September 10, 1988	Costa Mesa	United States	Pacific Amphitheatre
September 11, 1988	Las Vegas	United States	Circus Maximus at Caesars Palace
September 13, 1988	Anchorage	United States	West Anchorage High School Auditorium
September 14, 1988	Fairbanks	United States	Carlson Center
September 17, 1988	Honolulu	United States	Waikiki Shell
September 18, 1988	Lahaina	United States	Lahaina Civic Center
Odd dates
November 12, 1988	Los Angeles	United States	Palace Theater
December 4, 1988	Oakland	United States	Oakland Alameda County Coliseum Bridge School Benefit CSNY

== 1989 Tour ==
1989 Tour
- United States tour by Crosby, Stills & Nash
- Location: United States
- Start date: August 25, 1989
- End date: November 26, 1989
- Legs: 2
- No. of shows: 32

=== Lineup ===
- David Crosby – guitar, vocals
- Stephen Stills – guitar, keyboards, vocals
- Graham Nash – guitar, keyboards, vocals
- Mike Finnigan – keyboards
- Bob Glaub – bass
- Joe Vitale – drums
- Joe Lala – percussion

=== Dates ===
Date	City	Country	Venue
Odd dates
July 4, 1989	Hershey	United States	Hersheypark Stadium
Leg 1
August 25, 1989	White Plains	United States	Westchester County Center
August 27, 1989	Atlantic City	United States	Bally's Grand Hotel & Casino
August 28, 1989	Atlantic City	United States	Bally's Grand Hotel & Casino
September 2, 1989	Darien Center	United States	Lakeside Amphitheatre
September 3, 1989	Auburn Hills	United States	The Palace at Auburn Hills
September 4, 1989	Allentown	United States	Great Allentown Fair
September 10, 1989	Lincoln	United States	Bob Devaney Sports Center
September 11, 1989	Merrillville	United States	Star Plaza Theatre
September 14, 1989	Poughkeepsie	United States	Mid-Hudson Civic Center
September 15, 1989	Springfield	United States	Symphony Hall
September 16, 1989	Syracuse	United States	Landmark Theater
September 18, 1989	Poughkeepsie	United States	Mid-Hudson Civic Center
September 20, 1989	Halifax	Canada	Halifax Metro Center
September 21, 1989	Moncton	Canada	Moncton Coliseum
September 23, 1989	Toronto	Canada	Massey Hall
September 25, 1989	Ottawa	Canada	Southam Hall
September 26, 1989	Tampa	United States	Tampa Bay Performing Arts Center
September 27, 1989	Orlando	United States	Bob Carr Performing Arts Center
September 28, 1989	Clearwater	United States	Ruth Eckerd Hall
September 30, 1989	Sunrise	United States	Sunrise Musical Theater
October 7, 1989	Yakima	United States	State Fair Park
October 13, 1989	Phoenix	United States	Arizona State Fair Arizona Veterans Memorial Coliseum
October 14, 1989	Phoenix	United States	Arizona State Fair Arizona Veterans Memorial Coliseum
October 28, 1989	Shoreline Amphitheatre	United States	Bridge School Benefit CSNY
November 8, 1989	Santa Cruz	United States	The Catalyst
November 9, 1989	Santa Cruz	United States	The Catalyst
November 18, 1989	New York	United States	United Nations General Assembly
November 20, 1989	West Berlin	West Germany	Brandenburger
November 21, 1989	West Berlin	West Germany	unknown venue
November 26, 1989	Daly City	United States	Earthquake Relief Concert Cow Palace

== 1990 Live It Up Tour ==
1990 Tour
- United States tour by Crosby, Stills & Nash
- Location: North America
- Start date: March 31, 1990
- End date: September 11, 1993

=== Lineup ===
- David Crosby – guitar, vocals
- Stephen Stills – guitar, keyboards, vocals
- Graham Nash – guitar, keyboards, vocals
- Mike Finnigan – keyboards
- Kim Bullard – keyboards
- Jorge Calderon – bass
- Joe Vitale – drums
- Michito Sanchez – percussion

== 1994 25th Anniversary After the Storm Tour ==
1994 Tour
- United States tour by Crosby, Stills & Nash
- Location: North America, Japan
- Start date: January 22, 1994
- End date: December 27, 1995

=== Lineup ===
- David Crosby – guitar, vocals
- Stephen Stills – guitar, keyboards, vocals
- Graham Nash – guitar, keyboards, vocals
- Mike Finnigan – keyboards
- Alexis Sklarevski – bass
- Jody Cortez – drums
- Ethan Johns – various

== 1996 Tour ==
1996 Tour
- United States tour by Crosby, Stills & Nash
- Location: North America, South Africa
- Start date: January 11, 1996
- End date: November 13, 1996

=== Lineup ===
- David Crosby – guitar, vocals
- Stephen Stills – guitar, keyboards, vocals
- Graham Nash – guitar, keyboards, vocals
- Mike Finnigan – keyboards
- Gerald Johnson – bass
- Joe Vitale – drums

== 1997–98 Tour ==
1997–98 Tour
- United States tour by Crosby, Stills & Nash
- Location: North America
- Start date: February 14, 1997
- End date: December 2, 1998

=== Lineup ===
- David Crosby – guitar, vocals
- Stephen Stills – guitar, keyboards, vocals
- Graham Nash – guitar, keyboards, vocals
- Mike Finnigan – keyboards
- James Hutchinson – bass
- Joe Vitale – drums

=== Dates ===
Date	City	Country	Venue
Leg 1
February 14, 1997	Atlantic City	United States	Circus Maximus Theater
February 15, 1997	Atlantic City	United States	Circus Maximus Theater
February 16, 1997	Atlantic City	United States	Circus Maximus Theater
February 21, 1997	Stateline	United States	Caesars Tahoe
February 22, 1997	Stateline	United States	Caesars Tahoe
February 27, 1997	Atlantic City	United States	Caesars Atlantic City
February 28, 1997	Las Vegas	United States	Circus Maximus at Caesars Palace
March 1, 1997	Las Vegas	United States	Circus Maximus at Caesars Palace
March 2, 1997	Las Vegas	United States	Circus Maximus at Caesars Palace
March 4, 1997	Los Angeles	United States	Palace Theater
Leg 2
April 23, 1997	Fargo	United States	Civic Auditorium
April 24, 1997	Mankato	United States	Mankato Civic Center
April 26, 1997	Minneapolis	United States	Orpheum Theater
April 27, 1997	Milwaukee	United States	Riverside Theater
April 29, 1997	Rockford	United States	Coronado Theater
April 30, 1997	Dubuque	United States	Five Flags Center
May 2, 1997	South Bend	United States	C. Morris Civic Auditorium
May 4, 1997	Cleveland	United States	Agora
May 5, 1997	Kent	United States	Kent State University
May 8, 1997	Cincinnati	United States	Taft Theater
May 9, 1997	Columbus	United States	Palace Theater
May 10, 1997	Detroit	United States	Fox Theater
May 12, 1997	Merrillville	United States	Star Plaza Theater
May 13, 1997	Louisville	United States	Louisville Palace Theater
May 14, 1997	Charleston	United States	Municipal Auditorium
May 17, 1997	Wallingford	United States	Oakdale Theater
May 18, 1997	Upper Darby	United States	Tower Theater
May 19, 1997	Red Bank	United States	Count Basie Theater
May 21, 1997	New York	United States	Beacon Theatre
May 22, 1997	Vienna	United States	Filene Center
May 24, 1997	Rio Marr Beach Resort	Puerto Rico	The West Inn
Leg 3
June 11, 1997		United States	
June 13, 1997		United States	
June 14, 1997		United States	
June 15, 1997		United States	
June 17, 1997		United States	
June 18, 1997		United States	
June 21, 1997		United States	
June 24, 1997		United States	
June 26, 1997		United States	
June 27, 1997		United States	
June 28, 1997		United States	
June 30, 1997		United States	
July 1, 1997		United States	
July 3, 1997		United States	
July 5, 1997		United States	
July 6, 1997		United States	
July 8, 1997		United States	
July 9, 1997		United States	
July 11, 1997		United States	
July 12, 1997		United States	
July 13, 1997		United States	
July 15, 1997		United States	
July 16, 1997		United States	
July 17, 1997		United States	
July 18, 1997		United States	
July 19, 1997		United States	
July 20, 1997		United States	
August 22, 1997		United States	
Leg 4
September 14, 1997		United States	
September 15, 1997		United States	
September 16, 1997		United States	
September 18, 1997		United States	
September 19, 1997		United States	
September 20, 1997		United States	
September 22, 1997		United States	
September 23, 1997		United States	
September 26, 1997		United States	
September 27, 1997		United States	
September 28, 1997		United States	
Leg 5
February 1, 1998		United States	
February 5, 1998		United States	
February 20, 1998		United States	
February 21, 1998		United States	
February 27, 1998		United States	
February 28, 1998		United States	
March 13, 1998		United States	
March 14, 1998		United States	
March 20, 1998		United States	
March 21, 1998		United States	
March 22, 1998		United States	
September 4, 1998		United States	
September 6, 1998		United States	
September 18, 1998		United States	
October 2, 1998		United States	
October 3, 1998	Melbourne, FL	United States	Maxwell C. King Center for the Performing Arts
October 4, 1998		United States	
December 2, 1998		United States	

== 1999 Tour ==
1999 Tour
- United States tour by Crosby, Stills & Nash
- Location: North America
- Start date: February 12, 1999
- End date: March 3, 1999
- Legs: 1
- No. of shows: 10

=== Lineup ===
- David Crosby – guitar, vocals
- Stephen Stills – guitar, keyboards, vocals
- Graham Nash – guitar, keyboards, vocals
- Mike Finnigan – keyboards
- James Hutchinson – bass
- Joe Vitale – drums

=== Dates ===
Date	City	Country	Venue
February 12, 1999	Atlantic City	United States	Circus Maximus Theater
February 13, 1999	Atlantic City	United States	Circus Maximus Theater
February 14, 1999	Atlantic City	United States	Circus Maximus Theater
February 19, 1999	Tahoe	United States	Caesars Tahoe
February 20, 1999	Tahoe	United States	Caesars Tahoe
February 21, 1999	Santa Monica	United States	Santa Monica Civic Auditorium
February 25, 1999	Las Vegas	United States	Circus Maximus at Caesars Palace
February 26, 1999	Las Vegas	United States	Circus Maximus at Caesars Palace
February 27, 1999	Las Vegas	United States	Circus Maximus at Caesars Palace
March 3, 1999	Thousand Oaks	United States	Fred Kavli Theater
