= CSN 2012 =

Live album by Crosby, Stills & Nash
- Released: July 2, 2012
- Recorded: April 22, 2012
- Genre: Rock
- Label: Atlantic
- Producer: Kevin Madigan; Graham Nash

Crosby, Stills & Nash chronology
Demos (2009)	CSN 2012 (2012)	CSNY 1974 (2014)

Professional ratings
Review scores
Source	Rating
AllMusic	3/5 stars

CSN 2012 is a live album by Crosby, Stills & Nash. Released in 2012 on Atlantic Records, it is the group's first release on their original label in 18 years. The album derives from a recording done April 22 on the group's 2012 tour in both audio and video formats.

== Background ==
After reuniting for a Bridge School Benefit in 2010, the surviving members of Buffalo Springfield played seven shows in 2011. In 2012, Stephen Stills, Richie Furay, and Neil Young planned a full-blown Buffalo Springfield tour. After venues had been secured and tour personnel hired, Young dropped out to join up with Crazy Horse for two albums and a tour instead, leaving Stills "in a lurch". Crosby & Nash canceled their plans for a duo tour to reunite with Stills for a Crosby, Stills and Nash tour in place of the Buffalo Springfield tour.

== Track listing ==
The DVD track list is in the same order as the compact disc version.

=== Disc one ===
No.	Title	Writer(s)	Length
1.	"Carry On/Questions"	Stephen Stills	8:43
2.	"Marrakesh Express"	Graham Nash	3:44
3.	"Long Time Gone"	David Crosby	6:30
4.	"Military Madness"	Nash	4:16
5.	"Southern Cross"	Stills, Richard Curtis, Michael Curtis	5:09
6.	"Lay Me Down"	James Raymond	5:08
7.	"Almost Gone"	Nash, Raymond	4:33
8.	"Wasted on the Way"	Nash	3:33
9.	"Radio"	Crosby	3:48
10.	"Bluebird"	Stills	7:18
11.	"Déjà Vu"	Crosby	13:18
12.	"Wooden Ships"	Crosby, Paul Kantner, Stills	10:40

=== Disc two ===
No.	Title	Writer(s)	Length
1.	"Helplessly Hoping"	Stills	5:02
2.	"In Your Name"	Nash	5:06
3.	"Girl from the North Country"	Bob Dylan	4:51
4.	"As I Come of Age"	Stills	4:09
5.	"Guinnevere"	Crosby	7:01
6.	"Johnny's Garden"	Stills	5:22
7.	"So Begins the Task"	Stills	4:03
8.	"Cathedral"	Nash	7:58
9.	"Our House"	Nash	3:46
10.	"Love the One You're With"	Stills	7:14
11.	"For What It's Worth"	Stills	5:55
12.	"Teach Your Children"	Nash	5:06
13.	"Suite: Judy Blue Eyes"	Stills	9:20

== Personnel ==
- David Crosby – vocals, rhythm guitar
- Stephen Stills – vocals, guitars, keyboards
- Graham Nash – vocals, rhythm guitar, keyboards
- Shane Fontayne – guitars
- James Raymond – keyboards, vocals
- Todd Caldwell – organ
- Kevin McCormick – bass guitar
- Steve DiStanislao – drums
