= Crosby & Nash: Highlights =

Studio album by Crosby & Nash
- Released: July 18, 2006
- Genre: Rock
- Label: Sanctuary Records
- Producer: David Crosby, Graham Nash, Stephen Barncard

Crosby & Nash chronology
Crosby & Nash (2004)	Crosby & Nash: Highlights (2006)

Crosby & Nash Highlights is a shortened version of 2004's Crosby & Nash.

== Track listing ==
1. "Lay Me Down" (James Raymond) – 3:37
2. "Milky Way Tonight" (Graham Nash) – 3:25
3. "Don't Dig Here" (Raymond, Nash, Kunkel) – 6:10
4. "Penguin in a Palm Tree" (Nash) – 3:50
5. "I Surrender" (Cohn) – 4:15
6. "Through Here Quite Often" (David Crosby, Dean Parks) – 4:05
7. "They Want It All" (Crosby) – 5:35
8. "Puppeteer" (Raymond) – 4:06
9. "Live on (the Wall)" (Flannery, Nash, Plunkett, Proffer) – 3:22
10. "Grace" (Raymond) – 0:46
11. "Jesus of Rio" (Nash, Jeff Pevar) – 4:12
12. "How Does It Shine?" (Crosby) – 5:21
13. "My Country 'Tis of Thee" (Traditional) – 1:43

== Personnel ==
- David Crosby - vocals, guitar
- Graham Nash - vocals, guitar, harmonica, piano
- Dean Parks - guitar
- Jeff Pevar - guitar
- Dan Dugmore - pedal steel guitar
- Steve Farris - electric guitar
- Leland Sklar - bass
- James Raymond - keyboards
- Matt Rollings - piano
- Russ Kunkel - drums, percussion
- Luis Conte - percussion
- Arnold McCuller - vocals
- Kate Markowitz - vocals
- Windy Wagner - vocals
