= Crosby & Nash (album) =

Studio album by Crosby & Nash
- Released: August 10, 2004
- Recorded: January–February 2004
- Length: 74:27
- Label: Sanctuary Records
- Producer: Nathaniel Kunkel, David Crosby; Russell Kunkel, Graham Nash

Crosby & Nash chronology
The Best of Crosby & Nash: The ABC Years (2002)	Crosby & Nash (2004)	Crosby & Nash: Highlights (2006)

Professional ratings
Review scores
Source	Rating
AllMusic	3/5 stars

Crosby & Nash is a double album by Crosby & Nash, released in 2004, the duo's fourth and final studio recording. It was the first studio album by the duo since Whistling Down the Wire 28 years earlier, and, to date, is the final album of original material by any grouping of Crosby, Stills, Nash & Young in a quartet, trio, or duo configuration. In 2006, a truncated version of this album appeared containing 13 of its tracks on one disc. The song "Michael (Hedges Here)" is in tribute to their friend, guitarist Michael Hedges, who died in 1997. The core band for the album includes James Raymond and Jeff Pevar from Crosby's CPR project, session musicians Leland Sklar and Russ Kunkel who played with Crosby and Nash in the 1970s, and guitarist Dean Parks. All tracks were recorded from January 12, 2004, through February 12, 2004, at Center Staging in Burbank, California and at Kazoo Studios in Kauai.

== Track listing ==
Disc one
No.	Title	Writer(s)	Length
1.	"Lay Me Down"	James Raymond	3:37
2.	"Puppeteer"	Raymond	4:06
3.	"Through Here Quite Often"	David Crosby, Dean Parks	4:05
4.	"Grace"	Raymond	0:46
5.	"Jesus of Rio"	Graham Nash, Jeff Pevar	4:12
6.	"I Surrender"	Marc Cohn	4:15
7.	"Luck Dragon"	Raymond, Crosby	4:45
8.	"On the Other Side of Town"	Nash	3:35
9.	"Half Your Angels"	Nash	5:05
10.	"They Want It All"	Crosby	5:35
11.	"How Does It Shine?"	Crosby	5:21

Disc two
No.	Title	Writer(s)	Length
1.	"Don't Dig Here"	Raymond, Nash, Russ Kunkel	6:10
2.	"Milky Way Tonight"	Nash	3:25
3.	"Charlie"	Crosby, Parks	3:34
4.	"Penguin in a Palm Tree"	Nash	3:50
5.	"Michael (Hedges Here)"	Nash	2:41
6.	"Samurai"	Crosby	1:42
7.	"Shining on Your Dreams"	Nash, Kunkel	2:35
8.	"Live on (the Wall)"	Patrick Flannery, Nash, Steve Plunkett, Spencer Proffer	3:22
9.	"My Country 'Tis of Thee"	traditional	1:43

== Personnel ==
- David Crosby – vocals, acoustic guitar
- Graham Nash – vocals, electric piano, guitar, harmonica
- Dean Parks – guitars
- Jeff Pevar – guitars
- James Raymond – keyboards
- Leland Sklar – bass
- Russell Kunkel – drums, percussion
- Matt Rollings – piano on "On the Other Side of Town," "Penguin in a Palm Tree," and "Michael (Hedges Here)"
- Luis Conte – percussion on "Jesus of Rio" and "How Does It Shine"
- Dan Dugmore – pedal steel guitar on "Penguin in a Palm Tree"
- Steve Farris – electric guitar on "Penguin in a Palm Tree"
- Kate Markowitz, Arnold McCuller, Windy Wagner – background vocals on "Penguin in a Palm Tree"

Production personnel

- Nathaniel Kunkel – producer, recording, mixing
- David Crosby, Russ Kunkel and Graham Nash – co-producers
- Kevin Plessner, Christine Sirous and Seth Waldmann – assistant engineers
- John Hurst – system engineer
- Robert Hadley and Doug Sax – mastering at The Mastering Lab (Hollywood, California)
- Kinski Gallo – art direction, photography, cover photography
- Edward Chen – design
- David "Mr. Bonzai" Goggin – photography
- Buzz Person – photography
