= Live at the Wiltern (CPR album) =

Live album by Crosby, Pevar and Raymond (CPR)
- Released: September 21, 1999
- Recorded: November 1998
- Genre: Rock
- Length: 113:41
- Label: Samson
- Producer: CPR; Paul Dieter

Crosby, Pevar and Raymond (CPR) chronology
CPR (1998)	Live at the Wiltern (1999)	Just Like Gravity (2001)

Professional ratings
Review scores
Source	Rating
Allmusic	3/5 stars

Live at the Wiltern is the second live album recorded by Crosby, Pevar and Raymond (CPR). It was recorded at the Wiltern Theater in Los Angeles in November 1998.

== Track listing ==
1. "Morrison" (David Crosby, James Raymond) – 5:46
2. "Little Blind Fish" (Crosby, Jeff Pevar) – 4:40
3. "One for Every Moment" (James Raymond) – 5:46
4. "That House" (CPR, Crosby) – 6:25
5. "Homeward Through the Haze" (Crosby) – 6:43
6. "At the Edge" (CPR, Crosby) – 4:53
7. "It's All Coming Back" (Crosby, Pevar) – 4:32
8. "Rusty and Blue" (Crosby, Pevar) – 9:52
9. "Delta" (Crosby) – 8:06

CD 2

1. "Dream for Him" (Crosby) – 6:43
2. "Old Soldier" (Marc Cohn) – 5:25
3. "Hero" (Phil Collins, Crosby) Performed by: CPR, Phil Collins, Graham Nash – 6:09
4. "Long Time Gone" (Crosby) – 6:28
5. "Déjà Vu" (Crosby) – 12:57
6. "Eight Miles High" (Gene Clark, Crosby, Roger McGuinn) – 5:29
7. "Ohio" (Neil Young) – 6:24
8. "Almost Cut My Hair" (Crosby) Performed by: CPR, Graham Nash – 7:23

== Personnel ==
Musicians

- David Crosby – guitar, vocals
- Stevie DiStanislao – drums, percussion, vocals
- Andrew Ford – bass
- Jeff Pevar – lead guitar, vocals
- James Raymond – keyboards, piano, Vocals

Guest musicians

- Graham Nash
- Marc Cohn
- Phil Collins

Production

- Marianne Hamann – photography
- J.J. McLeod – engineer
- Tim Owen – photography
- John Gonzales – guitar technician
- Chris Rich – engineer
- Norman Waitt Jr. – liner notes
- Paul Dieter – engineer, producer
