= CPR (album) =

Studio album by Crosby, Pevar and Raymond (CPR)
- Released: June 23, 1998
- Genre: Rock
- Length: 55:16
- Label: Sampson
- Producer: David Crosby; Jeff Pevar; James Raymond; Dan Garcia

Crosby, Pevar and Raymond (CPR) chronology
| Live at Cuesta College (1998) | CPR (1998) | Live at the Wiltern (1999) |

Professional ratings
Review scores
| Source | Rating |
|---|---|
| Allmusic | 3/5 stars |

CPR is the first studio album recorded by Crosby, Pevar and Raymond (CPR). CPR's self-titled debut album came four years after David Crosby received a life-saving liver transplant. Featuring renowned session guitarist Jeff Pevar and Crosby's son James Raymond, the trio crafted smart, heady, jazz-influenced rock that showcased their stunning harmonies. In 2001, they released Just Like Gravity.

== Track listing ==
1. "Morrison" (lyrics: David Crosby; music: James Raymond) – 4:45
2. "That House" (lyrics: Crosby; music: CPR) – 5:25
3. "One for Every Moment" (Raymond) – 3:59
4. "At the Edge" (lyrics: Crosby; music: CPR) – 4:21
5. "Somebody Else's Town" (lyrics: Crosby & Jeff Pevar; music: Raymond) – 5:15
6. "Rusty and Blue" (Crosby) – 7:35
7. "Somehow She Knew" (lyrics: Crosby; music: Crosby & Craig Doerge) – 7:05
8. "Little Blind Fish" (lyrics: Crosby; music: Pevar) – 3:37
9. "Yesterday's Child" (lyrics: Crosby & Raymond; music: Raymond) – 4:00
10. "It's All Coming Back to Me Now" (lyrics: Crosby & Pevar; music: Pevar) – 3:50
11. "Time Is the Final Currency" (Crosby) – 5:18

== Personnel ==
- David Crosby - lead vocals (1, 2, 4, 6–8, 10, 11), vocals (3, 5, 9), acoustic guitar (2, 6, 7, 11), acoustic 12-string guitar (5)
- Jeff Pevar - vocals, electric guitar (1, 4–6, 9–11), acoustic guitar (2, 4, 8, 9), electric slide guitar (2), nylon string guitar (3), fretless bass (4), ebow (5), mandolin (7)
- James Raymond - lead vocals (3, 5, 9), vocals (1, 2, 4, 6–8, 10, 11), piano (1–5, 7, 9), wedding ring (3), electric piano (5, 10, 11), acoustic piano (6), drum programming (5), organ (8, 10)
- Leland Sklar - bass (1, 3, 5)
- James "Hutch" Hutchinson - bass (2, 7, 9, 10), fretless bass (6, 8, 11)
- Russ Kunkel - drums (2)
- Steve DiStanislao - drums (1, 4)
- Luis Conte - percussion (1–6)
- Steve Tavaglione - soprano saxophone (3)
- Curt Bisquera - drums (5)
- Debra Dobkin - percussion (8)
- Michael Bland - drums (9, 10)

== Production ==
- CPR and Dan Garcia - producers
- Jan Crosby - executive producer
- Dan Garcia - engineer
- Sebastian Haimerl and Bobby Salcedo - assistant engineers
- John Gonzales - guitar technician
- Edd Kolakowski - piano technician
- R. Mac Holbert - cover design
- Floyd Crosby - cover photography
