= Steve DiStanislao =

American drummer (born 1963)

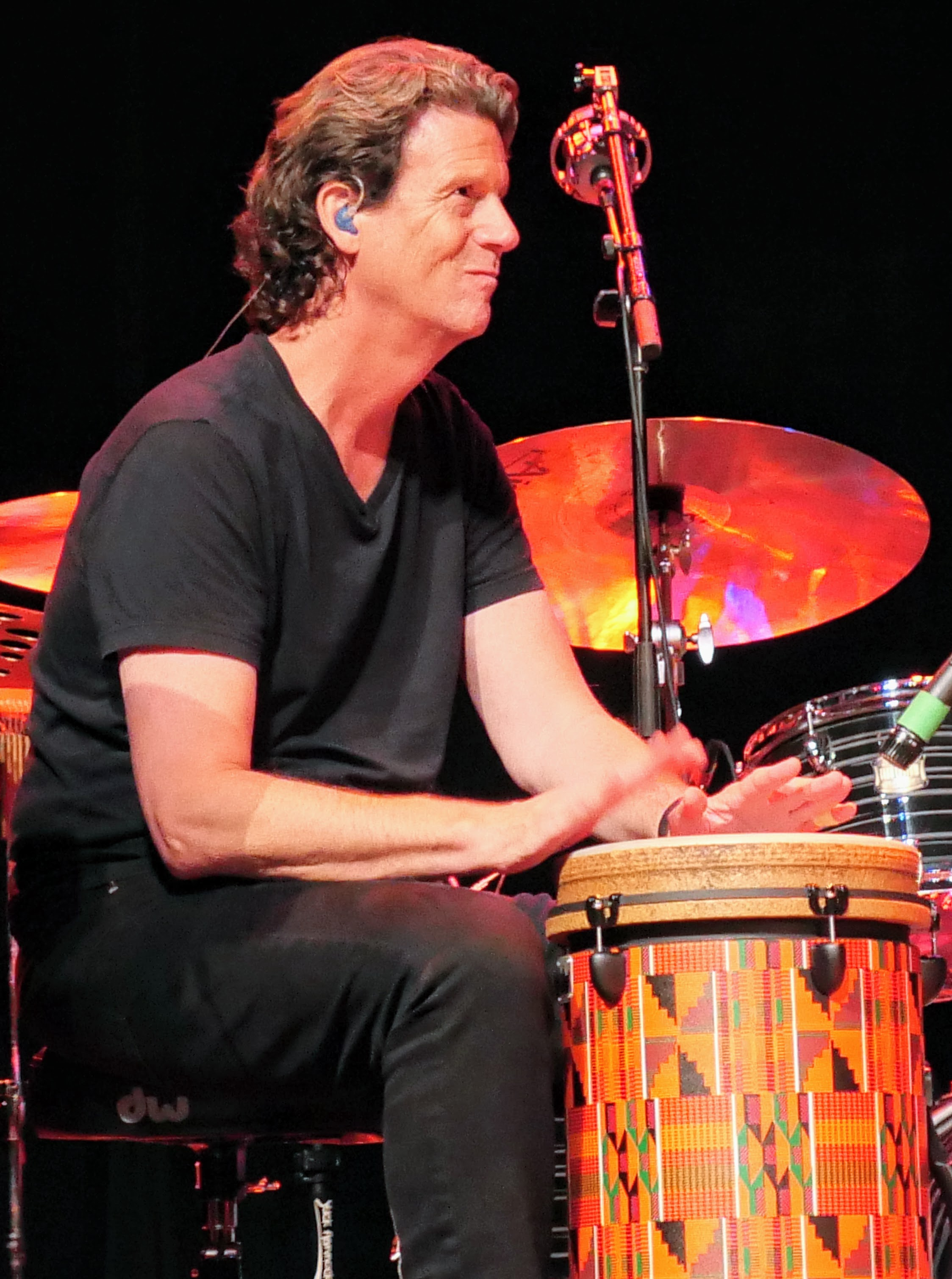
- DiStanislao performing in 2019

Background information
- Born: November 18, 1963 (age 62); Orange County, California, United States
- Genre: Rock
- Occupations: Musician; producer; entrepreneur
- Instrument: Drums
- Years active: 1980–present

Steve DiStanislao (born November 18, 1963) is an American drummer.

== David Crosby ==
DiStanislao frequently collaborated with David Crosby. He toured with Crosby & Nash, CPR, and Crosby's solo tours. He appears on the CPR albums CPR, Live at the Wiltern, and Just Like Gravity, as well as Crosby's solo albums Croz, Sky Trails, and For Free. While he was performing with Crosby & Nash at the Royal Festival Hall in London in 2005, he came to the attention of concert attendee David Gilmour.

== David Gilmour ==
DiStanislao toured and recorded with Pink Floyd guitarist David Gilmour, promoting his solo album On an Island. The touring band featured Pink Floyd keyboardist Richard Wright and occasional Floyd collaborator Dick Parry on saxophones. Also featured were long-time Gilmour collaborators Guy Pratt on bass and Jon Carin on keyboards, lap steel and vocals as well as Roxy Music's Phil Manzanera on guitars and vocals, who also co-produced On an Island.

The tour included three nights at the Royal Albert Hall with special guests David Bowie, Crosby & Nash, Robert Wyatt, Mica Paris and Nick Mason. Other performances took place in St. Mark's Square in Venice.

The last official show of the tour took place in Gdańsk, Poland where the band were joined by conductor Zbigniew Preisner and The Polish Baltic Philharmonic Orchestra, to celebrate the 26th anniversary of Solidarity of the Shipyard Worker's Union in Gdańsk. Over 55,000 fans turned out for this concert. The show was documented on Gilmour's live album Live in Gdańsk (2008).

In January 2007, DiStanislao, along with Guy Pratt and Richard Wright, joined Gilmour at his barn at his home in Sussex, England for a series of jamming sessions. The sessions consisted of the band playing instrumental material composed by Gilmour.

DiStanislao appears on five of the ten tracks on Gilmour's Rattle That Lock (2015) album, including its title track, as well as performing on the subsequent "Rattle That Lock" Tour 2015-2016, which was captured on the live album and video Live at Pompeii.

DiStanislao appears on the title track of Gilmour's 2024 album, Luck and Strange, in material taken from one of the 2007 jam sessions which also features Wright.
