= It's All Coming Back to Me Now... =

Live album by David Crosby
- Released: January 24, 1995
- Recorded: December 7, 1993
- Venue: Whisky a Go Go in Hollywood, California
- Studios: Record Plant (Los Angeles, California)
- Genre: Rock
- Length: 60:35
- Label: Atlantic
- Producer: Chris Rankin

David Crosby chronology
Thousand Roads (1993)	It's All Coming Back to Me Now... (1995)	King Biscuit Flower Hour (1996)

Professional ratings
Review scores
Source	Rating
AllMusic	2/5 stars

It's All Coming Back to Me Now... is a live album by David Crosby and his fourth solo effort. Chris Robinson of the Black Crowes and Graham Nash also appear on the album. Robinson duets with Crosby on "Almost Cut My Hair" and Nash appears on the last three songs.

== Track listing ==
All tracks composed by David Crosby; except where noted.

No.	Title	Writer(s)	Length
1.	"In My Dreams"		6:32
2.	"Rusty And Blue"		7:08
3.	"Hero"	Phil Collins, Crosby	4:57
4.	"Till It Shines On You"		5:39
5.	"Thousand Roads"		5:02
6.	"Cowboy Movie"		9:08
7.	"Almost Cut My Hair"		6:10
8.	"Déjà Vu"		10:18
9.	"Long Time Gone"		5:41
10.	"Wooden Ships"	Crosby, Paul Kantner, Stephen Stills	10:37

== Personnel ==
- David Crosby – vocals, guitars
- Mike Finnigan – keyboards (3–10), harmony vocals (3, 8–10)
- Jeff Pevar – guitars
- James "Hutch" Hutchinson – bass (2–10)
- Jody Cortez – drums (3–10)
- Kipp Lennon – harmony vocals (3, 8–10)
- Graham Nash – harmony vocals (8–10), harmonica (8), acoustic guitar (9, 10)
- Chris Robinson – vocals (7)

== Production ==
- Chris "Hoover" Rankin – producer, engineer, mixing
- Craig Brock – additional engineer, assistant engineer
- Joe Gastwirt – mastering at Oceanview Digital Mastering (Los Angeles, California)
- Nash Editions – cover design
- Murray Close – cover photography
- Siddons & Associates – management
- Gelfand, Rennert & Feldman – business management

Band crew

- John Gonzales
- Tony Michaels
- Mason Wilkinson

Live crew

- Chris "Hoover" Rankin – production manager, house sound engineer
- Connie Fernstorm – monitor engineer
- John Tripeny – engineer
- John Vanderslice – stage manager
