= Voyage (David Crosby album) =

Box set by David Crosby
- Released: November 21, 2006
- Genre: Folk rock
- Labels: Rhino Records; Warner Music Group
- Producers: Graham Nash; Joel Bernstein

David Crosby chronology
King Biscuit Flower Hour (1996)	Voyage (2006)	Croz (2014)

Professional ratings
Review scores
Source	Rating
Allmusic	3.5/5 stars

Voyage is a 3-CD box set by David Crosby. It features highlights from his career as a solo artist and with groups including The Byrds, various permutations of CSN&Y, and CPR. The tracks are arranged in general chronological order of release. One full disc is devoted to previously unreleased material, mainly acoustic demos.

The album was compiled by Graham Nash, who also compiled box sets for himself and for Stephen Stills. It was later reissued as The David Crosby Box with seven tracks removed from Disc 1 (1–3 and 17–20) due to licensing issues.

== Track listing ==
Disc One: Essential Vol. 1

1. "Eight Miles High" (Clark/McGuinn/Crosby) — The Byrds
2. "Renaissance Fair" (Crosby/McGuinn) — The Byrds
3. "Everybody's Been Burned" (Crosby) — The Byrds
4. "Wooden Ships" (Crosby/Kantner/Stills) — Crosby, Stills & Nash
5. "Guinnevere" (Crosby) — Crosby, Stills & Nash
6. "Long Time Gone" (Crosby) — Crosby, Stills & Nash
7. "Déjà Vu" (Crosby) — Crosby, Stills, Nash & Young
8. "Almost Cut My Hair" (Crosby) — Crosby, Stills, Nash & Young
9. "Tamalpais High (At About 3)" (Crosby) — David Crosby
10. "Laughing" (Crosby) — David Crosby
11. "Music Is Love" (Crosby/Nash/Young) — David Crosby
12. "Song with No Words (Tree with No Leaves)" (Crosby) — David Crosby
13. "What Are Their Names?" (Crosby/Garcia/Lesh/Shrieve/Young) — David Crosby
14. "I'd Swear There Was Somebody Here" (Crosby) — David Crosby
15. "Where Will I Be" (Crosby) — Crosby & Nash
16. "Page 43" (Crosby) — Crosby & Nash
17. "Critical Mass" (Crosby) — Crosby & Nash
18. "Carry Me" (Crosby) — Crosby & Nash
19. "Bittersweet" (Crosby) — Crosby & Nash
20. "Naked in the Rain" (Crosby/Nash) — Crosby & Nash
21. "Dancer" (Crosby) — Crosby & Nash

Disc Two: Essential Vol. 2

1. "Shadow Captain" (Crosby/Doerge) — Crosby, Stills & Nash
2. "In My Dreams" (Crosby) — Crosby, Stills & Nash
3. "Delta" (Crosby) — Crosby, Stills & Nash
4. "Compass" (Crosby) — Crosby, Stills, Nash & Young
5. "Tracks in the Dust" (Crosby) — David Crosby
6. "Arrows" (Hedges/Crosby) — Crosby, Stills & Nash
7. "Hero" (Collins/Crosby) — David Crosby
8. "Yvette in English" (Mitchell/Crosby) — David Crosby
9. "Rusty and Blue" (Crosby) — CPR
10. "Somehow She Knew" (Crosby) — CPR
11. "Breathless" (Crosby/Crosby/Pevar/Raymond/Ford/DiStanislao) — CPR
12. "Map to Buried Treasure" (Crosby/Crosby/Pevar/Raymond/Ford/DiStanislao) — CPR
13. "At the Edge" (Crosby/Pevar/Raymond) — CPR
14. "Through Here Quite Often" (Crosby/Parks) — Crosby & Nash
15. "My Country 'Tis of Thee" (Smith/trad., arr. Hedges) — David Crosby

Disc Three — Buried Treasure (All Previously Unissued)

1. "Long Time Gone" (Demo) (Crosby) — Crosby & Stills
2. "Guinnevere" (Alternate Mix) (Crosby) — David Crosby
3. "Almost Cut My Hair" (Demo) (Crosby) — David Crosby
4. "Games" (Demo) (Crosby) — David Crosby
5. "Déjà Vu" (Demo) (Crosby) — Crosby & Nash
6. "Triad" (Demo) (Crosby) — David Crosby
7. "Cowboy Movie" (Studio Version) (Crosby) — David Crosby
8. "Kids and Dogs" (Unissued Song) (Crosby) — David Crosby
9. "Have You Seen the Stars Tonight?" (Alternate Mix) (Kantner/Crosby) — Paul Kantner/Jefferson Starship
10. "The Lee Shore" (Live at Carnegie Hall, 1971) (Crosby) — Crosby & Nash
11. "Traction in the Rain" (Live at Carnegie Hall, 1971) (Crosby) — Crosby & Nash
12. "King of the Mountain" (Demo) (Crosby) — David Crosby
13. "Homeward Through the Haze" (Alternate Mix) (Crosby) — Crosby, Stills, Nash & Young
14. "Samurai" (Studio Version) (Crosby) — David Crosby
15. "Climber" (Studio Version) (Crosby) — Crosby, Stills, Nash & Young
16. "Dream for Him" (live in Columbus, OH, 2002) (Crosby) — Crosby, Stills, Nash & Young
