= Live at Cuesta College =

Live album by Crosby, Pevar and Raymond (CPR)
- Released: March 1998
- Recorded: 1997
- Genre: Rock
- Label: Sampson
- Producer: David Crosby; Jeff Pevar; James Raymond; Dan Garcia

Crosby, Pevar and Raymond (CPR) chronology
Live at Cuesta College (1998)	CPR (1998)

Live at Cuesta College is the debut album by the band CPR. It is a live document of their 1997 tour issued in limited release only via the CPR website.

== Track listing ==
1. "In My Dreams" – 6:51
2. "Tracks in the Dust" – 5:48
3. "Homewards Through the Haze" – 6:21
4. "Rusty & Blue" – 9:50
5. "Thousand Roads" – 5:33
6. "For Free" – 7:28
7. "Morrison" – 6:54
8. "Somehow She Knew" – 9:46
9. "'Til It Shines on You" – 4:56
10. "Time Is the Final Currency" – 8:01
11. "Where Will I Be/Page 43" – 6:06
12. "Delta" – 5:53
13. "Déjà Vu" – 12:13
14. "One for Every Moment" – 5:53
15. "Guinnevere" – 7:13
16. "Wooden Ships" – 10:12
