= Just Like Gravity =

Studio album by Crosby, Pevar and Raymond (CPR)
- Released: June 19, 2001
- Genre: Rock
- Label: Gold Circle Records
- Producers: David Crosby; Jeff Pevar; James Raymond; Dan Garcia

Crosby, Pevar and Raymond (CPR) chronology
Live at the Wiltern (1999)	Just Like Gravity (2001)

Professional ratings
Review scores
Source	Rating
AllMusic	4/5 stars

Just Like Gravity is the second studio album recorded by Crosby, Pevar and Raymond (CPR).

== Track listing ==
1. "Map to Buried Treasure" (David Crosby, Jan Crosby, Jeff Pevar, James Raymond, Andrew Ford, Steve DiStanislao) – 5:34
2. "Breathless" (Crosby, Crosby, Pevar, Raymond, Ford, DiStanislao) – 5:16
3. "Darkness" (Crosby, Pevar, Raymond) – 3:28
4. "Gone Forever" (Crosby, Pevar, Raymond) – 6:33
5. "Eyes Too Blue" (Raymond, Crosby) – 5:10
6. "Jerusalem" (Raymond) – 5:00
7. "Kings Get Broken" (Crosby) – 4:10
8. "Angel Dream" (Crosby, Nash, Raymond) – 6:41
9. "Katie Did" (Crosby, Jeff Pevar) – 4:02
10. "Climber" (Crosby) – 6:17
11. "Coyote King" (Crosby, Crosby, Pevar, Raymond, Ford, DiStanislao) – 5:10
12. "Just Like Gravity" (Crosby) – 3:49

== Personnel ==
- David Crosby – vocals, acoustic guitar (5, 7, 10, 12), electric guitar (6)
- Jeff Pevar – vocals (1, 3–11), acoustic guitar (1–4, 9, 11), electric guitar (1–4, 7–10), mandolin (5, 10), nylon string guitar (5), 6 & 12 string electric guitars (6)
- James Raymond – vocals (1–11), piano (1–2, 4–5, 7–11), Moog bass (1), marimba (2), synths (2, 4), Hammond organ (3, 8, 9), percussion (4), harmonica (5, 6), acoustic guitar (6)
- Steve DiStanislao – drums (1–11), percussion (5, 10, 11), vocals (6, 8)
- Andrew Ford – bass (2–5, 7–11)
- Jamaica Rafael – pizzicato violin (2)
- Leland Sklar – bass (6)
- Steve Tavaglione – alto flute (11)
