= King Biscuit Flower Hour (disambiguation) =

King Biscuit Flower Hour is a syndicated radio show.

King Biscuit Flower Hour may also refer to:

- King Biscuit Flower Hour (April Wine album), 1997
- King Biscuit Flower Hour (David Crosby album), 1996
- King Biscuit Flower Hour (Zebra album), 1999
- King Biscuit Flower Hour (In Concert), a 1996 album and DVD by Triumph

== See also ==
- King Biscuit Time
