= Songs for Survivors =

Studio album by Graham Nash
- Released: 30 July 2002
- Recorded: 2 October 2000 – 13 October 2000
- Studio: O'Henry Sound Studios (Burbank, California); Studio Without Walls (Santa Monica, California); Kazoo Studios (Kauai, Hawaii).
- Genre: Rock
- Length: 44:03
- Label: Artemis
- Producer: Graham Nash, Russ Kunkel, Nathaniel Kunkel

Graham Nash chronology
Innocent Eyes (1986)	Songs for Survivors (2002)	Reflections (2009)

Professional ratings
Review scores
Source	Rating
Allmusic	3/5 stars

Songs for Survivors is the fifth solo studio album by British-American singer-songwriter Graham Nash, released in July 2002.

== Track listing ==
All tracks are written by Graham Nash, except where noted

No.	Title	Writer(s)	Length
1.	"Dirty Little Secret"	Russ Kunkel, Nash	4:22
2.	"Blizzard of Lies"		4:08
3.	"Lost Another One"		3:23
4.	"The Chelsea Hotel"		3:55
5.	"I'll Be There for You"	Doug Ingoldsby, Nash, Joe Vitale	3:43
6.	"Nothing in the World"		5:21
7.	"Where Love Lies Tonight"	Nash, Vitale	3:13
8.	"Pavanne"	Richard Thompson, Linda Thompson	5:13
9.	"Liar's Nightmare"	Nash, Jean Ritchie	8:09
10.	"Come with Me"		2:37

== Personnel ==
- Graham Nash – lead vocals, acoustic guitar, harmonica
- Matt Rollings – keyboards
- Dan Dugmore – acoustic guitars, electric guitars, banjo, pedal steel guitar
- Steve Farris – acoustic guitars, electric guitars
- Dean Parks – acoustic guitars, electric guitars
- Viktor Krauss – acoustic bass, electric bass
- Russ Kunkel – drums, percussion
- Lenny Castro – percussion
- Sydney Forest – vocals
- David Crosby – vocals
- Nathaniel Kunkel – recording, mixing, mastering
- Andrew Ackland – assistant engineer
- Alan Mason – assistant engineer
- Wes Seidman – assistant engineer
- Doug Sax and Robert Hadley – stereo mastering at The Mastering Lab (Hollywood, California)
- Laura Grover – production coordinator
- Edd Kolakowski – keyboard technician
- John Gonzales – guitar technician
- Danny De La Luz – drum technician and atmosphere
