= King Biscuit Flower Hour (David Crosby album) =

Live album by David Crosby
- Released: August 27, 1996
- Recorded: April 8, 1989
- Venue: Tower Theater (Philadelphia, PA)
- Genre: Rock
- Length: 73:42
- Label: King Biscuit Flower
- Producer: Jack Ball; Steve Fish

David Crosby chronology
It's All Coming Back To Me Now... (1995)	King Biscuit Flower Hour (1996)	Voyage Box Set (2006)

Professional ratings
Review scores
Source	Rating
Allmusic	4.0/5 stars

King Biscuit Flower Hour is a live album by David Crosby, released in 1996. It is a recording of a concert at Tower Theater in Philadelphia, broadcast by King Biscuit Flower Hour, which took place in April 1989.

== Track listing ==
No.	Title	Length
1.	"Tracks In The Dust"	6:09
2.	"Guinnevere"	5:06
3.	"Compass"	4:22
4.	"In My Dreams"	4:42
5.	"Drive My Car"	3:50
6.	"Lady Of The Harbor"	3:39
7.	"Oh Yes I Can"	5:44
8.	"Monkey And The Underdog"	4:22
9.	"Delta"	5:13
10.	"Deja Vu"	7:48
11.	"Night Time For The Generals"	3:37
12.	"Wooden Ships"	8:03
13.	"Almost Cut My Hair"	5:16
14.	"Long Time Gone"	5:51

All tracks written by David Crosby, except 6, 8 and 11 by David Crosby and Craig Doerge and track 12 by David Crosby, Paul Kanter and Stephen Stills

== Personnel ==
- David Crosby – lead vocals, guitars
- Mike Finnigan – keyboards, backing vocals
- Dan Dugmore – guitars
- Davey Faragher – bass, backing vocals
- Jody Cortez – drums

== Production ==
- Executive Producer – Felix B. Mangione
- Production Coordination – Jack Ball and Steve Fish
- Mixed and Mastered by Glen Robinson at Studio Victor (Montreal, Quebec).
- Digital Editing – Ferand Martel
- Design – Barefoot Design
- Cover Photo – Murray Close
- Inside Photo – Chuck Pulin and David Seelig
- Tray Card Photo – Michael Spilotro
- Liner Notes – Bruce Pilato
