= Reflections (Graham Nash album) =

Box set by Graham Nash
- Released: 3 February 2009
- Recorded: 1965–2007
- Genre: Rock
- Label: Rhino

Graham Nash chronology
Songs for Survivors (2002)	Reflections (2009)	This Path Tonight (2016)

Reflections is a career-spanning 3-CD box set by British singer-songwriter Graham Nash including solo material, highlights from groups including The Hollies and various permutations of Crosby, Stills, Nash & Young, and previously unreleased tracks.

The release was compiled by Nash, who also compiled box sets for David Crosby and Stephen Stills.

== Track listing ==
Disc one:

1. "On a Carousel" (Mono) – The Hollies
2. "Carrie Anne" (Mono) – The Hollies
3. "King Midas in Reverse" (Mono) – The Hollies
4. "Marrakesh Express" – Crosby, Stills & Nash
5. "Pre-Road Downs" – Crosby, Stills & Nash
6. "Lady of the Island" – Crosby, Stills & Nash
7. "Our House" – Crosby, Stills, Nash & Young
8. "Teach Your Children" (Previously unreleased mix) – Crosby, Stills, Nash & Young
9. "Right Between the Eyes" (Previously unreleased version) – Graham Nash
10. "I Used to Be a King" (Previously unreleased mix) – Graham Nash
11. "Simple Man" (Previously unreleased mix) – Graham Nash
12. "Man in the Mirror" (Previously unreleased mix) – Graham Nash
13. "Better Days" (Previously unreleased mix) – Graham Nash
14. "Military Madness" (Previously unreleased mix) – Graham Nash
15. "Sleep Song" (Previously unreleased mix) – Graham Nash
16. "Chicago / We Can Change the World" (Previously unreleased mix) – Graham Nash
17. "Southbound Train" – Crosby/Nash
18. "Immigration Man" – Crosby/Nash
19. "Wild Tales" (Previously unreleased mix) – Graham Nash
20. "Prison Song" (Previously unreleased mix) – Graham Nash
21. "Oh! Camil (The Winter Soldier)" (Previously unreleased mix) – Graham Nash
22. "On the Line" (Previously unreleased mix) – Graham Nash
23. "You’ll Never Be the Same" (Previously unreleased mix) – Graham Nash
24. "Another Sleep Song" (Previously unreleased mix) – Graham Nash

Disc two:

1. "To the Last Whale" – Crosby/Nash
2. "Fieldworker" – Crosby/Nash
3. "Cowboy of Dreams" – Crosby/Nash
4. "Love Work Out" – Crosby/Nash
5. "Marguerita" – Crosby/Nash
6. "Taken at All" (Previously unreleased mix) – Crosby, Stills, Nash & Young
7. "Mutiny" – Crosby/Nash
8. "Just a Song Before I Go" – Crosby, Stills & Nash
9. "Cold Rain" (Previously unreleased mix) – Graham Nash
10. "Cathedral" (Previously unreleased mix) – Crosby, Stills & Nash
11. "Barrel of Pain (Half-Life)" – Graham Nash
12. "Magical Child" (Previously unreleased mix) – Graham Nash
13. "Song for Susan" – Crosby, Stills & Nash
14. "Wasted on the Way" – Crosby, Stills & Nash
15. "Love Is the Reason" (Previously unreleased mix) – Graham Nash
16. "Raise a Voice" – Crosby, Stills & Nash
17. "Clear Blue Skies" (Previously unreleased version) – Crosby, Stills & Nash
18. "Lonely Man" (Previously unreleased song) – Crosby, Stills & Nash
19. "Sad Eyes" (Previously unreleased mix) – Graham Nash
20. "Water from the Moon" (Previously unreleased song) – Graham Nash
21. "Soldiers of Peace" – Crosby, Stills, Nash & Young

Disc three:

1. "If Anybody Had a Heart" – Crosby, Stills & Nash
2. "Chippin’ Away" – Graham Nash
3. "After the Dolphin" – Crosby, Stills & Nash
4. "House of Broken Dreams" – Crosby, Stills & Nash
5. "Unequal Love" (live in Lennox, MA, 1993) – Graham Nash
6. "Liar's Nightmare" (live in Tampa, FL, 1993) – Graham Nash
7. "Heartland" (Previously unreleased mix) – Crosby, Stills, Nash & Young
8. "These Empty Days" – Crosby, Stills & Nash
9. "Try to Find Me" (Previously unreleased song) – Graham Nash
10. "Two Hearts" (Previously unreleased version) – Carole King & Graham Nash
11. "Behind the Shades" (Previously unreleased song) – Graham Nash
12. "Michael (Hedges Here)" (Previously unreleased version) – Graham Nash
13. "I Surrender" – Crosby/Nash
14. "Live On (The Wall)" – Crosby/Nash
15. "Dirty Little Secret" – Graham Nash
16. "We Breathe the Same Air" (Previously unreleased song) – Graham Nash
17. "Grace" – Crosby/Nash
18. "Jesus of Rio" – Crosby/Nash
19. "In Your Name" (Previously unreleased song) – Graham Nash
