= Croz =

Studio album by David Crosby
- Released: January 28, 2014
- Recorded: October 2011–October 2013
- Genre: Rock
- Length: 47:03
- Label: Blue Castle Records
- Producers: Daniel Garcia; David Crosby; James Raymond

David Crosby chronology
Voyage (2006)	Croz (2014)	Lighthouse (2016)

Croz is the fourth studio album by American musician David Crosby. The album was released on January 28, 2014, by Blue Castle Records. It was Crosby's first studio album in over 20 years; his previous release was 1993's Thousand Roads.

== Background ==
In a November 2013, interview with Rolling Stone, Crosby spoke about the album, saying: "I wanted to challenge myself. Most guys my age would have done a covers record or duets on old material. This won't be a huge hit. It'll probably sell nineteen copies. I don't think kids are gonna dig it, but I'm not making it for them. I'm making it for me. I have this stuff that I need to get off my chest." He also spoke about why they decided to release the album independently, saying: "We didn't have any money. None. We could have gone and gotten a deal, but everybody in the music business is very leery about the big companies and what kind of lifespan they might have. Most people are doing it on their own, so that's what we did."

In the same interview, he explained that "If She Called" was inspired by a group of prostitutes that he saw near his hotel in Belgium, saying: "It was cold out and they had these skinny legs. They were trying to entice these drunk animals to fuck them. It was so gross, man. So sad. I imagined these girls had come from Kosovo or some place really hideous and they were working their way west, trying to get their way out of the horror show that happened in the middle of Europe. But that's all imaginary. Mostly, I started thinking about where they hide their heart, their soul, their spirit when they're doing it. How do they disassociate? You can be damn sure they do."

He also spoke about what "Set That Baggage Down" was inspired by, saying: "That's a thing you learn in AA. I went there for about fourteen and half years. You have to look at what got you there. You have to look at the mistakes, and I made some horrific ones, and then you have to learn from them, figure out how to not wind up there again. You have to set that baggage down and walk on. If you spend all your life looking over your shoulder at the things you did wrong, you're gonna walk smack into a tree." He also spoke about how he got Mark Knopfler to play guitar on "What's Broken", saying: "That was a huge piece of generosity on Mark's part. We sent him the song and he just fucking killed it. He did me a huge favor and we don't even know each other. He's just brilliant." He went on to explain how he got Wynton Marsalis to play trumpet on "Holding on to Nothing", saying: "He's a consummate musician. "I took a chance and asked him and he just said, 'Yeah, send me the tape.' What he played was just beautiful. He has tone for days."

In a January 2014, interview with Billboard he spoke about recording the album, saying: "We decided we were making a record, and, God, it's been the most wonderful experience. I don't know how we pulled it off, 'cause we don't have any money. Actually, I do know how we pulled it off; my son has a studio (the Bamboom Room in Altadena, Calif.) he built into his garage, and I would go down and sleep there on his fold-out couch and we would work on it. It took us about two and a half years to do it." He also spoke about the songs on the album he wrote with his son James Raymond, saying: "He brings chemistry. These songs, we worked a lot on them, man, on things like 'The Clearing' or 'Dangerous Night'...There's probably six different sets of words to 'Dangerous Night' and four or five sets to 'Find a Heart,' different iterations of words that we kept going back and forth, 'This isn't good enough' or 'This really, really opens up another place for us to go. Let's look there.' It's such an alive process. The communication is so good between James and I. It's...well, the evidence is there before you" on the album."

== Critical reception ==
Professional ratings
Aggregate scores
Source	Rating
Metacritic	71/100
Review scores
Source	Rating
AllMusic	3.5/5 stars
The Arts Desk	4/5 stars
Drowned in Sound	6/10
The Independent	3/5 stars
musicOMH	3/5 stars
The Oakland Press	3/4 stars
The Observer	4/5 stars
Q	4/5 stars
Uncut	8/10
USA Today	3/4 stars

Croz was met with generally positive reviews from music critics. At Metacritic, which assigns a normalized rating out of 100 to reviews from critics, the album received an average score of 71, which indicates "generally favorable reviews", based on 11 reviews. Stephen Thomas Erlewine of AllMusic gave the album three and a half stars out of five, saying "That Croz prefers certainty to the untrammeled melancholy of If I Could Only Remember My Name is a reflection of where he stands in 2014: he's aware he's building upon a past he sometimes pines for, yet he's restless enough to forage ahead into new territory, but only when he's surrounded by cozy, familiar settings." Molloy Woodcraft of The Observer gave the album four out of five stars, saying "Recorded at his son's home studio, David Crosby's first solo studio album in two decades has a pleasingly jazzy feel, the arrangements full of blocky piano chords and big string bass which, with Crosby's much-envied harmonies, create a pleasant fug." Andy Gill The Independent gave the album three out of five stars, saying "It’s been 20 years since David Crosby’s last solo offering, but Croz finds his fire undimmed, and his freak flag still proudly flying, if slightly tattered." Aaron Lavery of Drowned in Sound gave the album a six out ten, saying "Anyone expecting a Bowie-esque return to centre stage or a fiery riposte in the style of Neil Young will be disappointed – but Crosby has never been a master of reinvention or an instinctive musical wanderer. If you’re looking for a neat musical reminder that David Crosby is one of the most influential men of his era – and can still sparkle with some of that same musical magic today, Croz is a worthy listen."

Jerry Shriver of USA Today gave the album three out of four stars, writing that Crosby "crafts a soul-baring, poetic and mostly engaging work that will please longtime fans." Gary Graff of The Oakland Press gave the album three out of four stars, stating that the "11 tracks [are] laced with tasteful intricacies and nuanced sonics that sound just fine up front but reveal more layers with each successive listen." David Welsh of musicOMH gave the album three out of five stars, saying "Croz, like its maker, is something of a curiosity. In an aural sense, it’s perfectly proficient yet frequently bland. Thematically, there is little light and an awful lot of shade. It’ll never go down as a classic of the Crosby canon, yet it is quite unlike anything else he’s ever done. Perhaps it’s best summed up in four simple words – one for the purists."

== Track listing ==
No.	Title	Writer(s)	Length
1.	"What's Broken"	James Raymond	3:48
2.	"Time I Have"	David Crosby	3:49
3.	"Holding On to Nothing"	David Crosby, Sterling Price	3:41
4.	"The Clearing"	James Raymond	4:00
5.	"Radio"	David Crosby, James Raymond	3:45
6.	"Slice of Time"	David Crosby, Marcus Eaton, James Raymond	4:16
7.	"Set That Baggage Down"	David Crosby, Shane Fontayne	4:01
8.	"If She Called"	David Crosby	4:59
9.	"Dangerous Night"	David Crosby, James Raymond	5:57
10.	"Morning Falling"	David Crosby, James Raymond	3:41
11.	"Find a Heart"	David Crosby, Marcus Eaton, James Raymond	5:04

== Personnel ==
- David Crosby – lead vocals, electric guitar (8)
- James Raymond – acoustic piano (1, 2, 5, 6, 9–11), Fender Rhodes (1, 3, 11), synthesizers (1, 4–6, 9–11), synth bass (1, 4, 5, 7, 9, 10), virtual pedal steel (1), percussion programming (1), backing vocals (2, 5, 9), drum programming (4, 7, 9, 10), sampled acoustic and electric guitars (4), sampled acoustic guitar (10)
- Todd Caldwell – Hammond B3 organ (2)
- Mark Knopfler – electric guitar (1), guitar solo (1)
- Marcus Eaton – acoustic guitar (1–7, 9, 11), backing vocals (1, 2, 4–7, 9, 11), electric guitar (4), electric sitar (4), 12-string acoustic guitar (8)
- Shane Fontayne – electric guitar (2, 4, 6, 7, 9), bass guitar (7), percussion (7), backing vocals (7)
- Kevin McCormick – bass guitar (2, 6), fretless bass (3)
- Leland Sklar – bass guitar (11)
- Steve DiStanislao – drums (1, 2, 4–6, 9, 11), percussion (2, 4, 11)
- Wynton Marsalis – trumpet (3)
- Steve Tavaglione – EWI (10), soprano saxophone (11)

== Production ==
- Producers – Daniel Garcia, David Crosby and James Raymond.
- Recorded and Mixed by Daniel Garcia
- Additional Engineers – Bil Lane, Eddy Santos, Glen Suravech and Rich Tosi.
- Additional recording (B3 organ) on Track 2 – Kevin Madigan
- Additional recording (trumpet) on Track 3 – Jeffrey Jones
- Recorded at The Bamboom Room (Altadena, CA); Radio Hill Recorders (Los Angeles, CA); Rumor Mill Recording (Santa Ynez, CA); Groove Masters (Santa Monica, CA); Jazz At Lincoln Center (New York, NY).
- Mastered by Doug Sax and Robert Hadley at The Mastering Lab (Ojai, CA).
- Art Direction and Design – Brian Porizek
- Photography – Daniel Garcia, Marcus Eaton and Buzz Person.

== Charts ==
Chart (2014)	Peak position
Spanish Albums (Promusicae)	97
US Billboard 200	36
