= CPR (band) =

American band

- Origin: Los Angeles
- Genres: Jazz-rock
- Years active: 1997–2004
- Labels: Sampson Music; Gold Circle
- Past members: David Crosby; Jeff Pevar; James Raymond

CPR (also billed as Crosby, Pevar & Raymond) was a jazz-rock band consisting of singer-songwriter David Crosby (a founding member of the Byrds and Crosby, Stills, Nash & Young), session guitarist Jeff Pevar, and Crosby's son, keyboardist James Raymond.

The first song that Crosby and Raymond co-wrote, "Morrison", was performed live for the first time in January 1997. The song recalled Crosby's ambivalent feelings about the portrayal of Jim Morrison in Oliver Stone's The Doors (1991). The success of the band's initial 1997 tour spawned a studio album, CPR, which was released in March 1998. Following another studio album, Just Like Gravity, in 2001, and several successful tours, the group disbanded in 2004.

In addition to continuing to perform with his father as part of the touring bands for Crosby & Nash and Crosby, Stills & Nash, Raymond has served as musical director and session player for most of Crosby's ensuing solo output and related tours, including Croz (2014) and Sky Trails (2017). From 2004 to 2005, Pevar was a member of the Crosby, Stills & Nash touring band alongside Raymond. Pevar's only solo album to date (2012's From the Core) was recorded in the Oregon Caves National Monument.

In 2017, following session work on Sky Trails, Pevar and Raymond toured together once again with drummer Stevie DiStanislao, keyboardist/vocalist Michelle Willis, and bassist Mai Agan as Crosby's backing group, the tour credited to David Crosby & Friends. That same lineup toured again in 2019 as David Crosby & the Sky Trails Band. In 2020 both studio albums, CPR and Just Like Gravity, were reissued by the BMG label. In 2021, both live albums will be reissued as well.

== Discography ==
- Live at Cuesta College, Samson Music 1998
- CPR, Samson Music 1998
- Live at the Wiltern, Samson Music 1999
- Just Like Gravity, Gold Circle 2001
