= Jeff Pevar =

American musician

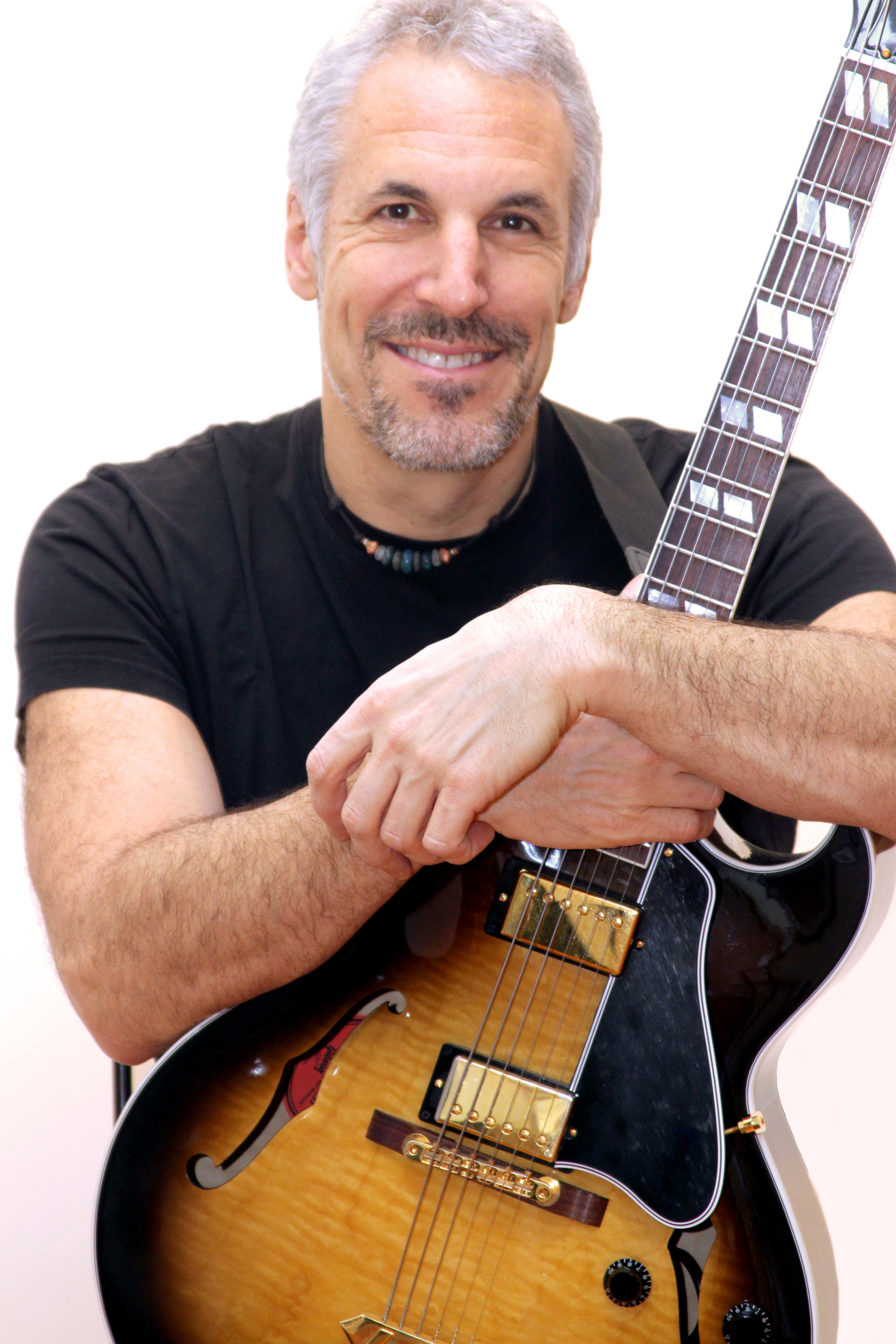
- Pevar in 2010

Background information
- Birth name: Jeffrey Pevar
- Born: February 16, 1957 (age 68)
- Genres: Rock; jazz; blues; R&B
- Occupation: Musician
- Instruments: Guitar; bass; mandolin; Dobro; lap steel; harmonica
- Years active: 1970s–present
- Labels: Pet Peev Music
- Formerly of: CPR; Jazz Is Dead
- Website: pevar.com

Jeffrey Pevar is an American producer, band leader, composer, touring and session musician. Pevar was the co-founder of CPR, (with David Crosby and James Raymond), The Gilmour Project (with Scott Guberman, Mark Karan, Kasim Sulton and Prairie Prince), JP3 (with Matt Spencer and Christo Pillani), and ZepDrix (with Inger Nova). Pevar recorded his debut record From the Core on his label Pet Peev Music, released in December 2012. In 2015 Pevar released the CD, Grateful Jazz which he produced for the ensemble Jazz Is Dead.

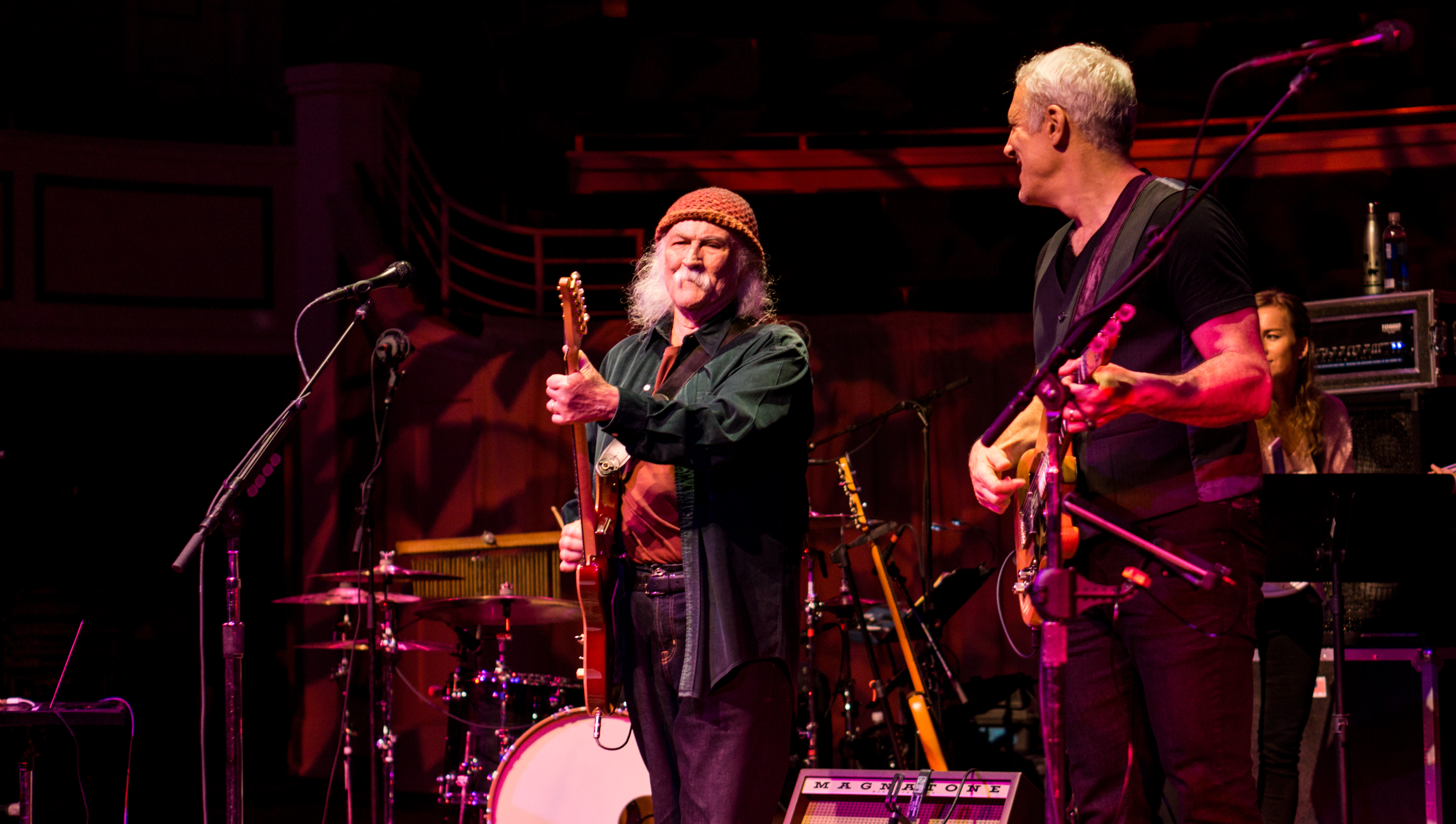
Pevar & Crosby in 2019

Pevar has worked with Crosby, Stills and Nash, Donald Fagen's Rock & Soul Revue, James Taylor, Marc Cohn, Ray Charles, Joe Cocker, Jimmy Webb, Rickie Lee Jones, Dr. John, Carly Simon, Kenny Loggins, Wilson Pickett, Jazz Is Dead, Phil Lesh and Friends, David Foster, Meat Loaf, Phil Collins, Aztec Two-Step, Richie Havens, Odetta, Jonatha Brooke, Willy Deville, Scott Murowski, Joe Linus, Peter Gallway and Pat McGee. He is a founding member of CPR: Crosby, Pevar & Raymond. In 2022 and 2023 Pevar toured with the Gilmour Project performing Pink Floyd songs.

== Associated acts ==
- CPR
- Jazz Is Dead
- Ray Charles
- Crosby, Stills & Nash
- Phil Lesh & Friends
- Joe Cocker
- Rickie Lee Jones
- Marc Cohn
- Jefferson Starship
- Bette Midler
- Cast of Clowns
- The Gilmour Project
- ZepDrix
