= Michelle Phillips filmography =

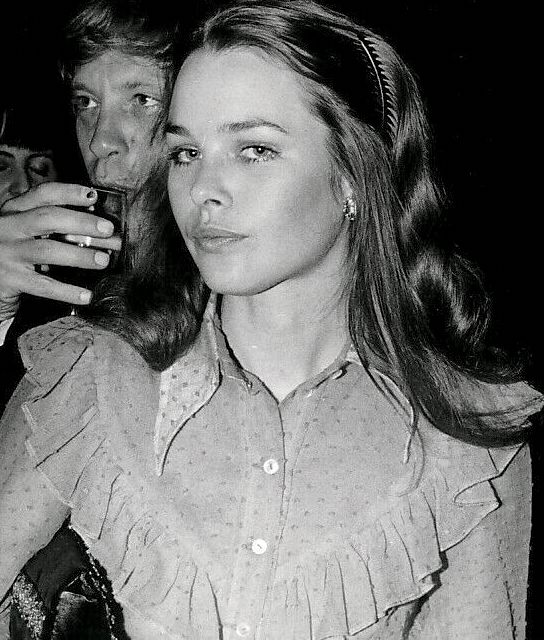
Phillips at the 1971 Golden Globe Awards

Michelle Phillips is an American actress and singer whose career spans over five decades. She initially came to prominence as a vocalist in the group The Mamas and the Papas in 1965. She had her first major screen appearance in a minor role in Dennis Hopper's The Last Movie (1971) before being cast as Billie Frechette in the John Dillinger biopic Dillinger (1973), which earned her a Golden Globe Award nominations for Most Promising Newcomer. Phillips subsequently had leading roles in the television films The Death Squad and The California Kid (both 1974).

In 1977, she was cast as Natacha Rambova in the Rudolph Valentino biopic Valentino, directed by Ken Russell. Subsequent film roles included The Man with Bogart's Face (1980), and the nature horror film Savage Harvest (1981). Throughout the majority of the 1980s, Phillips worked prolifically in television, appearing in guest-starring roles on Fantasy Island and The Love Boat, as well as appearing in a number of television films, such as Murder Me, Murder You (1983) and Secrets of a Married Man (1984).

Beginning in 1987, Phillips portrayed Anne Matheson on the series Knots Landing, a role she continued until 1993. She subsequently provided the voice role of Raven on the short-lived Ralph Bakshi animated series Spicy City (1997), and appeared in several episodes of Beverly Hills, 90210 (1997–1998), playing Abby Malone, mother of Valerie Malone. In the 2000s, Phillips appeared in several independent films, including the comedy Jane White Is Sick & Twisted (2002) and the gay-themed drama Harry + Max (2004), and the comedy Kids in America (2005). Since the millennium, she has also appeared in a number of documentary films as an interview subject, including Feminists: What Were They Thinking? (2018) and Echo in the Canyon (2019).

== Film ==
Key
| † | Denotes documentary film appearances |

| Year | Title | Role | Director(s) | Notes | Ref. |
|---|---|---|---|---|---|
| 1968 | Monterey Pop † | Herself | D. A. Pennebaker | Documentary film | |
| 1970 | Saturation 70 | | Tony Foutz | Unfinished; lost film | |
| 1971 | The Last Movie | Banker's Daughter | Dennis Hopper | | |
| 1973 | Dillinger | Evelyn "Billie" Frechette | John Millius | Nominated—Golden Globe Award for Most Promising Newcomer | |
| 1974 | The Death Squad | Joyce Kreski | Harry Falk | Television film | |
| 1974 | The California Kid | Maggie | Richard T. Heffron | Television film | |
| 1975 | Shampoo | Girl at Party | Hal Ashby | Uncredited | |
| 1975 | Miracle | Trixie | Edward Ruscha | Short film | |
| 1977 | Valentino | Natacha Rambova | Ken Russell | | |
| 1978 | The Users | Marina Brent | Joseph Hardy | Television film | |
| 1979 | Bloodline | Vivian Nichols | Terence Young | | |
| 1980 | The Man with Bogart's Face | Gena | Robert Day | | |
| 1981 | Savage Harvest | Maggie | Robert L. Collins | | |
| 1982 | Moonlight | Meredith Tyne | Jackie Cooper; Rod Holcomb | Television film | |
| 1983 | Murder Me, Murder You | Chris Jameson | Gary Nelson | Television film | |
| 1984 | Secrets of a Married Man | Katie Jordan | William Graham | Television film | |
| 1985 | The Covenant | Claire Noble | Walter Grauman | Television film | |
| 1985 | Stark: Mirror Image | Jennifer Clayton | Noel Nosseck | Television film | |
| 1986 | American Anthem | Linda Tevere | Albert Magnoli | | |
| 1987 | Assault and Matrimony | Madge Evers | James Frawley | Television film | |
| 1989 | Let It Ride | Mrs. Davis | Joe Pytka | | |
| 1989 | Mike Hammer: Murder Takes All | Leora Van Treas | John Nicolella | Television film | |
| 1989 | Trenchcoat in Paradise | Suzanna Hollander | Martha Coolidge | Television film | |
| 1991 | Keep on Running | Tracy | Holm Dressler | | |
| 1991 | Scissors | Ann Carter | Frank De Felitta | | |
| 1993 | Joshua Tree | Esther Severance | Vic Armstrong | Also known as: Vanishing Red and Army of One | |
| 1993 | Rubdown | Jordana Orwitz | Stuart Cooper | Television film | |
| 1996 | No One Would Tell | Laura Collins | Noel Nosseck | Television film | |
| 1996 | Pretty Poison | Mrs. Stepanek | David Burton Morris | Television film | |
| 1999 | Sweetwater | Nancy Nevins | Lorraine Senna | Television film | |
| 2000 | Lost in the Pershing Point Hotel | DeeDee Westbrook | Julia Jay Pierrepont III | | |
| 2000 | 919 Fifth Avenue | Mrs. Janet Van Degen | Neil Hagar | Television film | |
| 2000 | The Price of Air | Mrs. Rye | Josh Evans | | |
| 2001 | March | Joan | James P. Mercurio | | |
| 2002 | Jane White Is Sick & Twisted | June | David Michael Latt | | |
| 2004 | Harry + Max | Mother | Christopher Münch | | |
| 2005 | Kids in America | Singer | Josh Stolberg | | |
| 2006 | Unbeatable Harold | Erma | Ari Palitz | | |
| 2006 | And the Sea Took Us † | Herself (voice) | William Prosser | Documentary film | |
| 2009 | Betrayal | Eva Karlsen | Håkon Gundersen | | |
| 2016 | Good Fortune † | Herself | Joshua Tickell; Rebecca Harrell Tickell | Documentary film | |
| 2018 | Feminists: What Were They Thinking? † | Herself | Johanna Demetrakas | Documentary film | |
| 2019 | Echo in the Canyon † | Herself | Andrew Slater | Documentary film | |

== Television ==
| Year | Title | Role | Notes | Ref. |
|---|---|---|---|---|
| 1973 | Owen Marshall: Counselor at Law | Stephanie Marks | Episode: "The Prowler" | |
| 1977 | Aspen | Gloria Osborne | 3 episodes | |
| 1979 | The French Atlantic Affair | Jennie Barber | 3 episodes | |
| 1979–1984 | Fantasy Island | Various | 7 episodes | |
| 1980 | Vega$ | Officer Cassandra Hunt | 2 episodes | |
| 1981–1984 | The Love Boat | Barbara Carroll/Sheila Price/Linda Gammon | 5 episodes | |
| 1982 | Matt Houston | Glenda Collins | Episode: "Shark Bait" | |
| 1983 | The Fall Guy | Fay Charles | Episode: "The Chameleon" | |
| 1983 | The Mississippi | Caroline Foster | Episode: "The Last Voice You Hear" | |
| 1983 | Search For Tomorrow | Ruby Ashford | Procter & Gamble Productions | |
| 1983–1986 | Hotel | Elizabeth Bradshot Cabot | 8 episodes | |
| 1984 | Automan | Veronica Everly | Episode: "Murder, Take One" | |
| 1984 | Hammer House of Mystery and Suspense | Sandra Lorenz | Episode: "Paint Me a Murder" | |
| 1984 | Finder of Lost Loves | Alicia Marsh | Episode: "Yesterday's Child" | |
| 1984 | Murder, She Wrote | Regina Kellijian | Episode: "Death Casts a Spell" | |
| 1985 | T. J. Hooker | Teri Sherman | Episode: "Love Story" | |
| 1985 | Glitter | | Episode: "The Matriarch" | |
| 1987; 1989–1993 | Knots Landing | Anne Matheson | 88 episodes | |
| 1988 | Alfred Hitchcock Presents | Katherine Clark | Episode: "If Looks Could Kill" | |
| 1988 | Star Trek: The Next Generation | Jenice Manheim | Episode: "We'll Always Have Paris" | |
| 1993–1994 | Second Chances | Joanna Russell | 4 episodes | |
| 1994 | Burke's Law | Denise Kima | Episode: "Who Killed the Starlet?" | |
| 1994 | Herman's Head | Sandra Clayton | Episode: "A Head in the Polls" | |
| 1994 | Heaven Help Us | | Episode: "Stepping Out" | |
| 1994–1999 | Diagnosis Murder | Livia Parkinson/Christine Shaw | 2 episodes | |
| 1995 | Lois & Clark: The New Adventures of Superman | Claudette Wilder | Episode: "Target: Jimmy Olsen" | |
| 1996 | Malibu Shores | Suki Walker | 10 episodes | |
| 1996 | Too Something | Karen Reeves | Episode: "Donny's Mother" | |
| 1997 | The Big Easy | Collette | Episode: "Ghost of the Pricky Rose" | |
| 1997 | Pauly | Cassandra | Episode: "Foreplay" | |
| 1997 | Knots Landing: Back to the Cul-de-Sac | Anne Matheson Sumner | 2 episodes | |
| 1997 | Spicy City | Raven | 6 episodes | |
| 1997–98 | Beverly Hills, 90210 | Abby Malone | 9 episodes | |
| 1998 | Love Boat: The Next Wave | Quinn Ford | Episode: "True Course" | |
| 1998–2000 | The Magnificent Seven | Maude Standish | 3 episodes | |
| 1999 | Providence | Blair Mason | Episode: "If Memory Serves" | |
| 1999–2001 | Rude Awakening | Vivian | 3 episodes | |
| 2000 | Twice in a Lifetime | Edwina Lewis | Episode: "Old Flames" | |
| 2000 | Popular | Hellacious Akers | 2 episodes | |
| 2001 | All About Us | Juliana Merrick | Episode: "The Scare" | |
| 2001 | Spin City | Jane Moore | Episode: "The Wedding Scammer" | |
| 2001–2002 | That's Life | Maureen | 2 episodes | |
| 2001–2004 | 7th Heaven | Lilly | 3 episodes | |
| 2003 | Abby | Christine Newton | Episode: "The Mama and the Papa" | |

== Sources ==
- Collins, Max Alan; Traylor, James L. (2018). Mickey Spillane on Screen: A Complete Study of the Television and Film Adaptations. Jefferson, North Carolina: McFarland. ISBN 978-0-786-49242-8.
- Julius, Marshall (1996). Action!: The Action Movie A-Z. Bloomington, Indiana: Indiana University Press. ISBN 978-0-253-21091-3.
- Marill, Alvin H. (1980). Movies Made for Television: The Telefeature and the Mini-series, 1964-1979. New York City, New York: Da Capo Press. ISBN 978-0-306-80156-3.
- Marill, Alvin H. (1987). Movies Made for Television: The Telefeature and the Mini-series, 1964-1986 (4th ed.). New York City, New York: New York Zoetrope. ISBN 978-0-918-43280-3.
