= Celebration at Big Sur =

- Directed by: Baird Bryant; Johanna Demetrakas
- Produced by: Ted Mann; Carl Gottlieb
- Cinematography: Baird Bryant; Johanna Demetrakas; Gary Weis; Peter Smokler; Joan Churchill
- Distributed by: 20th Century Fox
- Release date: 1971
- Running time: 82 minutes
- Language: English

Celebration at Big Sur (also known simply as Celebration) is a film of the 1969 Big Sur Folk Festival in Big Sur, California, featuring Crosby, Stills, Nash and Young, Joan Baez, Joni Mitchell and others.

Released in 1971, the film was directed by Baird Bryant and Johanna Demetrakas. A young Gary Weis was among the cinematographers; other members of the camera and sound crew also went on to become famous in their fields, including Peter Smokler, Peter Pilafian, and Joan Churchill. The film was released in 2011 as a Region 1 DVD.

The festival, one in an annual series of concerts held on the grounds of the Esalen Institute in Big Sur from 1964 to 1971, was held on the weekend of September 13–14, 1969, only one month after the famous and considerably larger Woodstock Music & Art Fair, which is referred to repeatedly. Celebration at Big Sur did not receive the same critical acclaim as the 1970 Woodstock film.

== Performances ==
About 10–15,000 people camped out for three miles up and down Highway One for the two-day festival. The event audience was so well-mannered that those without the $4.00 admission price listened from the highway, even though there was no gate. The artists performed on a low stage behind a pool, backed by the Pacific Ocean. Musical performances dominate the film, with footage of surrounding occurrences interspersed into the music sequences.

=== Joan Baez ===
Baez was a Big Sur-festival regular whose folk music workshop at Esalen in 1965 helped attract pop/rock acts later to the festival. She is featured prominently throughout the film. Celebration begins with Baez opening the festival with Bob Dylan's "I Shall Be Released" and closes with her leading a large crowd in singing "Oh Happy Day" in the event's finale. She also sings two of her own compositions, "A Song for David" and "Sweet Sir Galahad", during the course of the film.

=== Crosby, Stills, Nash & Young ===
The film includes early footage of Neil Young, who had recently appeared at Woodstock with Crosby, Stills & Nash, but refused to be filmed. Here, fortified by session drummer Dallas Taylor and Motown bassist Greg Reeves, CSNY perform Young's "Sea of Madness" and "Down by the River". Perhaps the film's most famous scene is an altercation between Stephen Stills and a heckler.

=== Joni Mitchell ===
Mitchell, who did not appear at the Woodstock Festival, performs the song "Woodstock" prior to any album release, first attempting to teach the audience to sing the melodically complicated refrain. Ironically, Mitchell would later develop a well-known distaste for festival gigs, but in this performance her enthusiasm is evident. Mitchell talks about having spotted whales off the coast, and is generally seen with then-boyfriend Graham Nash of CSNY. She also sings "Get Together" with members of Crosby, Stills & Nash in a seemingly impromptu jam.

Although Mitchell had made earlier televised appearances, this may be her earliest filmed performance.

=== Others ===
In addition to CSNY, Baez and Mitchell, other performers featured in Celebration included John Sebastian, Dorothy Combs Morrison and The Combs Sisters, Mimi Fariña, Carol Ann Cisneros, Julie Payne, Chris Ethridge and The Struggle Mountain Resistance Band.

While Ruthann Friedman, The Flying Burrito Brothers and The Incredible String Band performed at this event, they do not appear in the film.

In the opening scene the filmmakers attempt to interview local patrol police, but fail to get permission.

== Songs performed ==
1. "I Shall Be Released" – Joan Baez
2. "Mobile Line" – John Sebastian with Stephen Stills
  - offstage
3. "Song for David" – Joan Baez
  - shown rehearsing offstage, with stage performance of same song cut in
4. "All of God's Children Got Soul" – Dorothy Combs Morrison and the Combs Sisters
5. "Sea of Madness" – CSNY
6. "4 + 20" – Stephen Stills solo performance
  - Stephen Stills introduces this number discussing his interaction with a heckler in the previous scene
7. "Get Together" – Joni Mitchell with Crosby, Stills & Nash and John Sebastian
8. "Put a Little Love in Your Heart" – Dorothy Combs Morrison and the Combs Sisters
  - incomplete
  - non-musical footage of nude sauna, audience happenings
9. "Swing Down Sweet Chariot" – various
  - offstage, incomplete
10. "Rainbows All Over Yours Blues" – John Sebastian
11. "Woodstock" – Joni Mitchell (playing piano)
  - non-musical footage of self-identified "freak" with Woodstock-themed bus
12. "Red-Eye Express" – John Sebastian with Stephen Stills
13. "Changes" – Mimi Fariña and Julie Payne with Stephen Stills
  - incomplete
14. "Malagueña Salerosa" – Carol Ann Cisneros
15. "Rise, Shine, and Give God the Glory" – The Struggle Mountain Resistance Band
  - incomplete
16. "Down By the River" – CSNY
  - incomplete, over 7 minutes
  - folk musician improvising outside the festival
17. "Sweet Sir Galahad" – Joan Baez
18. "Oh Happy Day" – Dorothy Combs Morrison and the Combs Sisters with Joan Baez
  - opens with Joan Baez rehearsing same number with Dorothy Combs Morrison
