= Robert Sacchi =

American character actor (1932–2021)

- Born: Robert Patsy Sacchi; March 27, 1932; Rome, Kingdom of Italy
- Died: June 23, 2021 (aged 89); Los Angeles, California, U.S.
- Education: Iona College; New York University
- Occupation: Actor
- Spouse: Angela De Hererera (m. 1970)
- Children: 8

Robert Patsy Sacchi (March 27, 1932 – June 23, 2021) was an Italian-American character actor who, since the 1970s, was known for his close resemblance to Humphrey Bogart. He appeared in many films and TV shows playing either Bogart or a character who happens to look and sound like him. He was best known for his role in the 1980 film The Man with Bogart's Face.

== Early life ==
Sacchi was born in Rome on March 27, 1932. His father, Alberto, worked as a carpenter; his mother was Marietta (D’Urbano). They emigrated to the United States when Sacchi was an infant, and settled in The Bronx. He attended Cardinal Hayes High School, where his friends and neighbors first noted his physical resemblance to Humphrey Bogart. He studied business and finance at Iona College, before obtaining a master's degree from New York University.

== Career ==
Sacchi's first three film credits in The French Sex Murders, Pulp, and Across 110th Street (all released in 1972) saw him play roles connected with Bogart in citing Bogart's manners. He began playing Bogart during the early 1970s, starting with Woody Allen's touring comedy Play It Again, Sam. He also played the role while touring college campuses.

Sacchi played the title role in the 1980 comedy The Man with Bogart's Face (also titled Sam Marlow, Private Eye) about a private investigator who gets plastic surgery to take after Bogart. He starred alongside Franco Nero, Michelle Phillips, Olivia Hussey, Yvonne De Carlo, Mike Mazurki, and George Raft (making his final film appearance). Writing in The New York Times, Tom Buckley was of the opinion that Sacchi "shows considerable acting skill in the title role, although his hopes for future employment in films would seem to be limited". In spite of this prediction, he went on to gain more roles as Bogart. These included Phil Collins's music video in 1990 titled "I Wish It Would Rain Down", as well as Sacchi's one-man show called Bogey’s Back. He also played Bogart in Fantasy Island (1981), Sledge Hammer! (1987), and the Cybill episode "In Her Dreams" (1997). He later recounted how he "never thought Bogie was too terrific-looking", adding that "like most kids at the time, I wanted to look like Gregory Peck".

During the 1990s, Sacchi played minor roles in Die Hard 2 (1990) and The Naked Truth (1992). In a notable episode of Tales from the Crypt entitled "You, Murderer" in 1995 (season 6 episode 15), Sacchi only provided the voice of a character who looks like Bogart. Computer manipulated film footage of Bogart provided the visuals. Also in 1995, he had a television role in the Pointman episode titled "The Psychic". One of his final film credits came in 1999 with Blast from the Past.

== Personal life ==
Sacchi had six children from his first marriage: Robert Jr., Barbara, Felicia, Maria, Lisa, and Anthony. His second marriage was to Peruvian artist Angela De Herrera. They remained married for 51 years until his death. Together, they had two children: Trish, and John who worked as a film producer.

Sacchi died on June 23, 2021, at Barlow Respiratory Hospital in Sherman Oaks, Los Angeles. He was 89, and suffered from a brief illness prior to his death.

== Selected filmography ==
=== Film ===
- 1972: The French Sex Murders (Casa d'appuntamento) – Inspector Fontaine
- 1972: Pulp – The Bogeyman
- 1972: Across 110th Street – Hood
- 1975: Shhh
- 1980: The Man with Bogart's Face – Sam Marlow
- 1984: E. Nick: A Legend in His Own Mind – Mr. Trowel
- 1987: Funland – Mario DiMauro / Bogie
- 1989: Another Chance – Mickey "Bogart" Pinco
- 1989: Cold Heat – Mikey Musconi
- 1990: Die Hard 2 – Engineer No. 3
- 1992: The Naked Truth – Gesundheim II
- 1992: The Erotic Adventures of the Three Musketeers – Athos
- 1999: Blast from the Past (1999) – Bogart DJ

=== Television ===
- 1981: Fantasy Island (episode: "Hard Knocks/Lady Godiva") – Humphrey Bogart
- 1983: Cadence 3 (episode dated March 9, 1983) – Himself
- 1983: Vorsicht Musik! (episode 1.4) – Himself
- 1987: Sledge Hammer! (episode: "Play It Again Sledge") – Bogie
- 1988: Simon & Simon (episode: "The Merry Adventures of Robert Hood") – Cyril Linehart
- 1989: Katts and Dog (episode: "Murder She Sang") – Nick McGee
- 1989: Der Stoff, aus dem die Filme sind
- 1994: Burke's Law (episode: "Who Killed Nick Hazard?") – Nick Hazard
- 1995: Tales from the Crypt (episode: "You, Murderer") – Lou Spinelli (voice)
- 1995: Pointman (episode: "The Psychic") – Humphrey Bogart
- 1997: Cybill (episode: "In Her Dreams") – Humphrey Bogart Look-Alike
- 1999: Oh Baby (episode: "Sitting on Babies") – Detective No. 1
- 2003: Biography (episode: "Humphrey Bogart") – Himself; Actor and Historian

=== Music Videos ===
- Phil Collins: "I Wish It Would Rain Down" – Humphrey Bogart

=== Songs ===
- "Jungle Queen" (1982)
- "Casablanca" (1982)
