= Victim of Romance =

Studio album by Michelle Phillips
- Released: February 1977
- Studio: Larrabee Sound Studios, North Hollywood, California; Record Plant, Los Angeles
- Genre: Pop rock
- Length: 36:18
- Label: A&M
- Producer: Jack Nitzsche

Professional ratings
Review scores
Source	Rating
The Encyclopedia of Popular Music	4/5 stars
Rolling Stone Record Guide, 1979	

Victim of Romance is singer and songwriter Michelle Phillips's first and only solo album, and was released in February 1977 (see 1977 in music). Despite good reviews, the record was unsuccessful and Phillips (previously with The Mamas & the Papas) then favored her acting career. The front cover photography was by Terry O'Neill.

== Critical reception ==
The Encyclopedia of Popular Music called the album "an unexpected triumph," writing that Moon Martin's contributions were "excellent." No Depression wrote that Phillips's "reported lack of confidence in her solo voice proved unfounded as she showed off a command of a spotlight that was previously diffused by her talented groupmates." Billboard called Victim of Romance a "thoroughly delightful collection of Spectoresque rockers and ballads, dreamy blues, and melodic upbeat pop flavored tunes."

== Track listing ==
1. "Aching Kind" (John "Moon" Martin) 3:20
2. "Let the Music Begin" (Alan Gordon) 3:56
3. "Victim of Romance" (John "Moon" Martin) 3:44
4. "Trashy Rumors" (Michelle Phillips) 4:04
5. "There She Goes" (Michelle Phillips) 4:19
6. "Paid the Price" (John "Moon" Martin) 2:42
7. "Baby as You Turn Away" (Barry Gibb, Robin Gibb, Maurice Gibb) 3:58
8. "Lady of Fantasy" (Michelle Phillips) 3:28
9. "Just One Look" (Gregory Carroll, Doris Payne) 2:44
10. "Where's Mine?" (Scott Mathews, Ron Nagle) 4:03

=== Bonus tracks ===
Bonus tracks on the limited edition, produced in 2005:

11. "No Love Today" (Roger Nichols, Willy Jennings)
12. "Aloha Louie" (Michelle Phillips, John Phillips)
13. "There She Goes" (original version) (Michelle Phillips)
14. "The Shoop Shoop Song (It's in His Kiss)" (Rudy Clark)
15. "Trashy Rumors" (original version) (John Phillips)
16. "Guerita" (Michelle Phillips)
17. "Aces with You" (Michelle Phillips)
18. "Champagne and Wine" (Roy Lee Johnson, Otis Redding, Alan Walden)
19. "Having His Way" (Michelle Phillips)
20. "You Give Good Phone" (Michelle Phillips)

== Personnel ==
- Michelle Phillips - vocals
- Moon Martin - guitar, backing vocals
- Jack Nitzsche - keyboards, percussion, arrangements
- Scott Mathews - drums, keyboards, guitar, bass, pedal steel guitar, lap steel guitar, accordion, percussion, vocals, additional production
- Ben Benay - guitar, mandolin
- David Allen, Jerry Donahue - guitar
- Greg Lee, Tim Drummond - bass
- Michael Boddicker - keyboards
- Don Randi - piano
- Gene Estes - percussion
- Steve Douglas - saxophone, percussion
- Bob Findley - trumpet
- Billy Guy, Cherie English, Grady Chapman, Jerome Evans, Kathy Ward, Maxine Willard Waters, Tricia Johns - backing vocals
- Jerry Jumonville - horn arrangement on "Just One Look"

Technical

- Kim King, Mike Beiriger, Sherry Klein - engineer
- Linda King - cover design, artwork
- Terry O'Neill - front cover photography
