= Faces of Jim =

British TV sitcom (1961–1963)

- Starring: Jimmy Edwards; June Whitfield; Ronnie Barker
- Country of origin: United Kingdom
- No. of episodes: 19 + 1 short

Production
- Running time: 30 minutes

Original release
- Network: BBC TV
- Release: 16 November 1961 – 9 August 1963

Faces of Jim is a black-and-white British comedy television series starring Jimmy Edwards, June Whitfield and Ronnie Barker, with each episode being an individual half-hour sitcom. The first series aired as The Seven Faces of Jim, the second as Six More Faces of Jim and the third series as More Faces of Jim. All the episodes were written by Frank Muir and Denis Norden.

== Cast ==
=== Main/recurring ===
- Jimmy Edwards as various characters (Jim, Jimmy Micklethwaite, Village Doctor, Frobisher, Caleb Tregarthen, Doc Jamieson, Patient, Mr Padgett, Roman Emperor Hadrian, Big Jim Paxton, Secret Agent Fleming, Sir James Chubb)
- June Whitfield as various characters (Nettie Winbourne, Prue Abernathy, Hannah Pengallon, Rowena, Madame Soo) (7 episodes)
- Ronnie Barker as various characters (Ron Glum, Witch Doctor, Dr Brunner, Lennie, Lascivius, Sanderson, Butters)
- Patrick Newell as various characters
- Richard Briers as Driver and various characters

=== Guests ===
- Victor Silvester
- Dick Emery
- Paul Eddington as Col. Downs (1 episode)
- Prunella Scales
- Toke Townley
- Richard Waring
- Amanda Barrie as Muriel (2 episodes)
- Melvyn Hayes
- Brian Oulton
- Donald Hewlett
- Jimmy Thompson
- Arthur Ridley
- Pat Coombs
- Derek Nimmo
- Edwin Apps
- Patrick Connor
- Derek Partridge as Grigor

== Episodes ==
=== Series 1: The Seven Faces of Jim (1961) ===
| Title | Airdate | Overview | IMDb link |
|---|---|---|---|
| The Face of Devotion | 16 November | Jim (Jimmy Edwards), a simple and honest garage owner, fears he is losing his wife (June Whitfield) to ballroom dancing. Guest starring Victor Silvester. | |
| The Face of Genius | 23 November | Jimmy Edwards plays a scientist who has to deal with a "thing" from outer space. Guest starring Dick Emery, Paul Eddington and Prunella Scales. | |
| The Face of Power | 30 November | Jimmy Micklethwaite (Jimmy Edwards) is a maker of gas mantles in Victorian Britain who has done very well, despite a militant workforce led a character played by Ronnie Barker. However, the invention of electric lighting destroys him. Guest starring Toke Townley. | |
| The Face of Dedication | 7 December | The saintly village doctor (Jimmy Edwards) holds a secret from his past, and this may be exposed upon the arrival of a smiling stranger. Guests starring Richard Waring and Amanda Barrie. | |
| The Face of Duty | 14 December | The retired Wing Commander Frobisher (Jimmy Edwards) runs a mini-cab company who with his assistant (June Whitfield) try to guide back their driver (played by Richard Briers) who is lost in the fog in their one and only vehicle. | |
| The Face of Guilt | 21 December | Caleb Tregarthen (Jimmy Edwards) owns a lighthouse in Cornwall is visited by Hannah Pengallon (June Whitfield), the sister of the previous lighthouse keeper who disappeared the year before. Guest starring Richard Briers. | |
| The Face of Enthusiasm | 28 December | A theatrical agent (Jimmy Edwards) has a flash of inspiration that then enables him to predict the incoming trends in popular entertainment. Guest starring Richard Briers, Amanda Barrie and Melvyn Hayes. | |

=== Series 2: Six More Faces of Jim (1962) ===
| Title | Airdate | Overview | IMDb link |
|---|---|---|---|
| The Face of Fatherhood | 15 November | Adapted from the radio series Take It From Here, Edwards and Whitfield reprised their characters from that, and Ronnie Barker played Ron Glum. In 1978, the Glum family reappeared on TV in The Glums. Guest starring Brian Oulton. | |
| The Face of Retribution | 22 November | The village grocer Jim discovers that he can read people's minds, and is appalled that his family thinks he needs medical help. Jim soon starts to use his gift to make money. Guest starring Richard Waring and Donald Hewlett. | |
| The Face of Wisdom | 29 November | Doc Jamieson (Jimmy Edwards) lives in Java and, unlike his younger colleague, understands the power of the local witch doctor (Ronnie Barker). Guest starring Jimmy Thompson. | |
| The Face of Perseverance | 6 December | James Bonnet is determined to marry off his six daughters and hosts and grand ball, and then tries to trick the unsuspecting bachelors into comprising positions with his daughters. Guest starring Richard Waring, Patrick Newell and Arthur Ridley. | |
| The Face of Loyalty | 13 December | During the war, Monger's Maraunders were a crack commando unit. Twenty years later they are brought together to aid their Colonel with one more daring mission. Guest starring Patrick Newell and Pat Coombs. | |
| The Face of Tradition | 20 December | Jim is very proud of the family tradition of a pantomime horse act called the Withers Brothers and Dobbin. However, his younger brother Sid wants to work in the mainstream theatre, and walks out on their partnership. They are reconciled when Jim marries Sid's replacement Gloria. Guest starring Patrick Newell. | |

=== Christmas Special (1962) ===
| Title | Airdate | Duration | Overview |
|---|---|---|---|
| The Christmas Face of Jim | 25 December | Short | Part of Christmas Night with the Stars; Like The Face of Fatherhood, this featured the Glum family. During a Christmas party, Ron and Eth try to complete a crossword while Pa makes advances towards a neighbour. |

=== Series 3: More Faces of Jim (1963) ===
| Title | Airdate | Overview | IMDb link |
|---|---|---|---|
| A Matter of Amnesia | 28 June | Dr Brunner (Ronnie Barker), a psychiatrist, has to unravel the puzzle of a patient (Jimmy Edwards) who is suffering from amnesia. | |
| A Matter of Growing Up | 5 July | Mr Padgett (Jimmy Edwards) finds that fatherhood is not rewarding thanks to his son Lennie (Ronnie Barker), who performs a hormone operation on a potted plant. Guest starring Derek Nimmo. | |
| A Matter of Spreadeagling | 19 July | Jimmy Edwards plays Roman Emperor Hadrian, June Whitfield plays Rowena, a hostile Saxon leader and Ronnie Barker plays Lascivius, a lovelorn lieutenant. Guest starring Edwin Apps. | |
| A Matter of Upbringing | 26 July | Big Jim Paxton (Jimmy Edwards) is a professional wrestler who has sacrificed the best years of his life to give his sons the advantages he did not have. Guest starring Amanda Barrie and Patrick Connor. | |
| A Matter of Espionage | 13 December | The retired secret agent Fleming (Jimmy Edwards) has made a startling discovery about an incident that happened during the war. He then tries to use the information to return to active service and to work for his old chief Sanderson (Ronnie Barker). Derek Partridge played Grigor in this episode. | |
| A Matter of Empire | 9 August | Sir James Chubb (Jimmy Edwards) is the Governor-General of Mandinao, a tropical island, who is threatened by the arrival of a crusading politician Butters (Ronnie Barker). However, Madame Soo (June Whitfield), the owner of a local teahouse, has a plan to help Chubb. | |

== Archive status ==
The first series of Faces of Jim survives in its entirety and so does the 1962 Christmas Short, but all of the other episodes (from series 2 and 3) were discarded by the BBC during the early 1970s, and remain missing. Some of the existing footage was used in a "Comedy Classics of the 60's" compilation VHS by Watershed Entertainment.
