= Comedy thriller =

Film genre

Comedy thrillers are a hybrid genre that draw subject matter generally from comedy and thrillers, combining suspense with sustained humor. It incorporates the core elements of thriller storytelling—high stakes, danger, escalating tension, and the possibility of death—while maintaining a comic tone throughout, a situation can be both genuinely threatening and funny at the same time. The characters are in real jeopardy, yet the film signals that the outcome will remain within the bounds of entertainment rather than genuine horror.

Examples range from verbal wit and farce to dark or absurd humor. The comedy-thriller differs from straight comedies with occasional danger or thrillers with brief comic relief because neither element dominates; both remain active throughout the story.

== Criteria ==
They often include a darker tone, relative to other genres, of humor. This tonal tightrope requires precise calibration. In these films, humor and tension do not alternate; they coexist and reinforce each other. The audience must believe, at least provisionally, that characters they have come to like could plausibly suffer serious harm or death, yet the film simultaneously reassures them—through performance style, directorial flourish, or narrative self-awareness—that the experience will remain playfully exhilarating rather than traumatically disturbing. When successful, the result is uniquely exhilarating: a heightened emotional state in which viewers find themselves laughing uncontrollably at situations that, under slightly different framing, would be cause for unmitigated terror.

In essence, the comedy-thriller functions as the cinematic equivalent of a meticulously engineered practical joke involving live ammunition: the threat is authentic enough to spike adrenaline, the execution is outlandish enough to provoke helpless laughter, and the ultimate resolution nearly always pulls the audience back from the brink with impeccable timing. The most accomplished works in the genre do not merely alternate between scares and punchlines; they fuse the two impulses so completely that each laugh is edged with unease and each moment of tension is undercut—or intensified—by comic absurdity. It is a form that demands both technical virtuosity from its creators and willingness from its audience to surrender simultaneously to dread and hilarity.

== List of comedy thriller films ==
Title	Release year
Arabesque	1966
The Big Fix	1978
Bullet Train	2022
Charade	1963
Clue: The Movie	1985
Crimewave	1985
Deathtrap	1982
Dr. Strangelove	1964
The Dream Team	1989
Family Plot	1976
Fargo	1996
Foul Play	1978
Fletch	1985
Friend of the World	2020
Hanky Panky	1982
Haunted Honeymoon	1986
Hemet, or the Landlady Don't Drink Tea	2023
Hopscotch	1980
In Bruges	2008
The King of Comedy	1983
Kingsman: The Secret Service	2014
Kiss Kiss Bang Bang	2005
Knight and Day	2010
Knives Out	2019
The Lady Vanishes	1938
The Ladykillers	1955
Lethal Weapon	1987
Lucky Number Slevin	2006
Mr. and Mrs. Smith	2005
Men at Work	1990
One Battle After Another	2025
Pulp	1972
Radioland Murders	1994
Silver Streak	1976
A Simple Favor	2018
A Thin Line Between Love and Hate	1996
The Thin Man	1934
Welcome to Collinwood	2002
Slither	1973

== See also ==
- Social thriller
- Postmodernist film
