= Shhh (film) =

- Directed by: Paul B. Price
- Produced by: Maurice Welsh Gable
- Starring: Rita Moreno; Robert Sacchi
- Distributed by: United Artists
- Release date: October 10, 1975 (United States)
- Country: United States
- Language: English
- Budget: $200,000
- Box office: $8,332

Shhh is a 1975 American comedy film directed by Paul B. Price and starring Rita Moreno and Robert Sacchi. The film was released in the United States on October 10, 1975, by United Artists.

== Plot ==
Seven short films, including the prize-winning Skaterdater, are packaged in this feature-length omnibus, with a framing device depicting a man and woman on a first date watching the shorts in a theatre.

== Cast ==
- Rita Moreno
- Robert Sacchi

== See also ==
- List of American films of 1975
