= Zsuzsanna Budapest =

American feminist writer (b. 1940)

Zsuzsanna Emese Mokcsay
- Born: 1940 (age 85–86); Budapest, Hungary
- Other names: Zsuzsanna Budapest, Z. Budapest
- Education: University of Vienna
- Occupations: Writer, activist, playwright, songwriter
- Known for: Founder of Dianic Wicca, Founder of the Susan B. Anthony Coven

Symbol of the Goddess with the Pentagram.

Zsuzsanna Emese Mokcsay (born 1940) is a Hungarian-American writer, activist, playwright and songwriter living in America who writes about feminist spirituality and Dianic Wicca under the pen name Zsuzsanna Budapest or Z. Budapest. She is the founder of the Susan B. Anthony Coven #1, which was founded in 1971 as the first women-only witches' coven. She founded the female-only style of Dianic Wicca.

She is the founder and director of the Women's Spirituality Forum, a nonprofit organization featuring lectures, retreats and other events, and was the lead of a cable TV show called 13th Heaven. She had an online autobiography entitled Fly by Night, and wrote for the religion section of the San Francisco Examiner on subjects related to Pagan religions. Her play The Rise of the Fates premiered in Los Angeles in the mid-seventies. She is the composer of several songs including "We All Come From the Goddess".

== Early life and education ==
Z. Budapest was born in Budapest, Hungary. Her mother, Masika Szilagyi, was a medium, a practicing witch, and a professional sculptor whose work reflected themes of goddess and nature spirituality. In 1956, when the Hungarian Revolution began, she fled to Austria as a political refugee. She finished high school in Innsbruck, graduated from a bilingual gymnasium, and won a scholarship to the University of Vienna where she studied linguistics.

Budapest emigrated to the United States in 1959, where she studied at the University of Chicago, with groundbreaking originator of the art of improvisation, Viola Spolin, and the improvisational theater group The Second City. She married and had two sons, Laszlo and Gabor, but later divorced. She realized she was a lesbian and chose, in her words, to avoid the "duality" between man and woman.

== Career ==
Budapest's first job in television was as a color girl for the CBS Network in New York, and was assigned to The Ed Sullivan Show.

=== Activism ===

Budapest moved to Los Angeles from New York City in 1970, and became an activist in the women's liberation movement. She was on the staff of the first Women's Center in the U.S. for many years, and became the founder and high priestess of Susan B. Anthony Coven #1, the first women-only witches' coven, which was founded in 1971. She was responsible for the creation of an Anti-Rape Squad and the Take Back the Night Movement in Southern California, and facilitated many of their street marches.

=== Tarot reading and arrest ===
In 1975, she was arrested for "fortune telling" at her candle and book store in Venice, California following a "sting" by an undercover policewoman, Rosalie Kimberlin, who received a tarot reading from her. Subsequently, Budapest was charged with violating a municipal by-law, Code 43.30, which made fortune telling unlawful. Budapest and her defense team described her as "the first witch prosecuted since Salem," and the ensuing trial became a focus for media and pagan protesters. Budapest was found guilty.

Duly, Budapest and her legal counsel set out to establish Wicca, and more specifically Dianic Wicca, as a bona fide religion. The state's Supreme Court reversed the guilty verdict as unconstitutional and in violation of the Freedom of Religion Act.

Following her conviction, she engaged in nine years of appeals on the grounds that reading the Tarot was an example of women spiritually counselling women within the context of their religion. With pro bono legal representation she was acquitted, and the laws against "fortune telling" were struck from California law.

=== Later career ===
In the 1980s, she created the TV show 13th Heaven, which ran on syndicated cable in the San Francisco Bay area for seven years.

She has organized the Goddess Festivals, which take place every other year, since 1991 where women gather for workshops and ritual in the Redwoods of California (see website goddess-fest.com).

== Works ==
=== Books ===
- The Feminist Book of Lights and Shadows. Feminist Wicca. 1975. OCLC 38697963.
- Selene, the Most Famous Bull-Leaper on Earth. Diana Press. 1976. ISBN 0-88447-010-5.
- The Grandmother of Time: A Woman's Book of Celebrations, Spells, and Sacred Objects for Every Month of the Year. HarperOne. 1989. ISBN 978-0-06-250109-7.
- The Holy Book of Women's Mysteries: Feminist Witchcraft, Goddess Rituals, Spellcasting and Other Womanly Arts. Wingbow Press. 1989. ISBN 978-0-914728-67-2.
- The Aquarian Holy Book of Women's Mysteries: Aquarian Rituals and Spells for Present and Future Witches. lulu Press. 2022. ISBN 978-0-137714407.
- Grandmother Moon: Lunar Magic in Our Lives—Spells, Rituals, Goddesses, Legends, and Emotions Under the Moon. HarperSanFrancisco. 1991. ISBN 0-06-250114-3.
- The Goddess in the Office: A Personal Energy Guide for the Spiritual Warrior at Work. HarperOne. 1993. ISBN 978-0-06-250087-8.
- The Goddess in the Bedroom: A Passionate Woman's Guide to Celebrating Sexuality Every Night of the Week. HarperSanFrancisco. 1995. ISBN 978-0-06-251186-7.
- Summoning the Fates: A Woman's Guide to Destiny. Three Rivers Press. 1999. ISBN 978-0-609-80277-9.
- My Dark Sordid Past as a Heterosexual: The Autobiography of Dr. Zsuzsanna E. Budapest, First Destiny. CreateSpace Independent Publishers Platform. 2014. ISBN 978-1500988906.

With Diana Paxson

- Celestial Wisdom for Every Year of Your Life: Discover the Hidden Meaning of Your Age. Weiser Books. 2003. ISBN 978-1-57863-282-4.

=== Music ===
- Copyright Z Budapest (1971). We All Come from The Goddess-Chant. PA0000474403.

=== Plays ===
- The Rise of the Fates: A Woman's Passion Play, 1976.

=== Films ===
- The Occult Experience (Motion picture). Cinetel Productions Ltd. 1987. Released on VHS by Sony/Columbia-Tristar on August 5, 1992.

== See also ==
- Goddess movement
- Feminist Witchcraft
- Dianic Wicca
- Feminists: What Were They Thinking?
