= Pulp (1972 film) =

- US film poster
- Directed by: Mike Hodges
- Written by: Mike Hodges
- Produced by: Michael Klinger
- Starring: Michael Caine; Mickey Rooney; Lionel Stander; Lizabeth Scott; Nadia Cassini
- Cinematography: Ousama Rawi
- Edited by: John Glen
- Music by: George Martin
- Production company: Three Michaels Film Productions
- Distributed by: United Artists
- Release dates: 16 August 1972 (London); November 1972 (limited); 8 February 1973 (New York City)
- Running time: 95 minutes
- Country: United Kingdom
- Language: English

Pulp is a 1972 British comedy thriller film, directed by Mike Hodges and starring Michael Caine, Mickey Rooney and Lizabeth Scott (in her final screen appearance).

== Plot ==
British writer Mickey King lives in Malta churning out violent, sexually charged pulp fiction novels under an array of lewd pen names such as "S. Odomy". King is approached to ghostwrite the autobiography of a mystery celebrity. Intrigued by the offer, King agrees and is told to go on a package tour, during which time a representative for the celebrity will make contact with him. King meets an American man named Miller, who identifies himself as a college professor. King assumes Miller is the mysterious contact but then discovers Miller dead in his bathtub after a hotel room mix-up.

The next day, Miller's body has mysteriously vanished and the real representative, a young woman named Liz, makes contact. King is taken to meet his subject: Preston Gilbert, a retired Hollywood star living in exile. Gilbert is known for portraying gangsters in movies and for his off-screen associations with real life mobsters. Revealing that he has been given a terminal cancer diagnosis, the pompous, vain Gilbert wants King to document his life story before he dies.

Gilbert and King attend a party. Among the attendees is Princess Betty Cippola, the wife politician Prince Cippola who seems to have a connection with Gilbert. After Gilbert has staged a practical joke and the party is underway, Miller returns disguised as a Catholic priest. Sensing danger, King flees as Miller opens fire, killing Gilbert. Party guests assume it's another of Gilbert's pranks and applaud as Gilbert dies.

As Gilbert's funeral is held, King pieces together the mystery. He discovers that Gilbert was connected to the death of young woman Silvana Lepri many years earlier and that other powerful people, including Prince Cippola, were also involved. As King visits Silvana's grave, Miller appears once more and begins shooting. King is wounded but eventually kills Miller by running him down with a truck. As he recovers from his injuries, King realises that Prince Cippola tried to keep the scandal secret by killing Gilbert and him. He is warned to keep quiet about what he knows or he will face murder charges for Miller's death.

== Cast ==
- Michael Caine as Mickey King
- Mickey Rooney as Preston Gilbert
- Lionel Stander as Ben Dinuccio
- Lizabeth Scott as Princess Betty Cippola
- Nadia Cassini as Liz Adams
- Dennis Price as The Englishman
- Al Lettieri as Jack Miller
- Leopoldo Trieste as Milos Marcovic
- Amerigo Tot as Sotgio
- Robert Sacchi as Jim Norman
- Ave Ninchi as Chambermaid
- Victor Mercieca as Prince Cippola
- Janet Agren as Sylvana
- Liù Bosisio as Typist
- Luciano Pigozzi as Clairvoyant

== Production ==
Originally titled Memoirs of a Ghost Writer, the film was almost entirely shot on the island of Malta. Facilities were provided by the then Malta Film Facilities and Intermed Sound Studio, later known as Britannia Film Sound Studios.

== Reception ==
In the Monthly Film Bulletin, Richard Combs wrote: "Plot, character and pastiche have been built up in a fairly loose and random fashion in this second feature by television director Mike Hodges. Various eccentrics act out their 'turns', occasionally to delightful effect, but never quite lift a light comedy-thriller through the more playful and productive inversions of parody. It is a conventional homage rather than a necessary irony, for instance, that invocations of Bogart and Bacall, and a smattering of titles and chat from the upper Chandler bracket, should be mingling with a spoof thriller about a hack writer whose only ambition is to match the output of Erle Stanley Gardner. The Chandler references remain as pale and homeless in this sun-blessed Mediterranean setting as they were in the grimmer climate of Get Carter."

In The Radio Times Guide to Films Tony Sloman gave the film 3/5 stars, writing: "One of the more interesting teams in the British post-New Wave period was that of the three Michaels – star Caine, writer/director Hodges, producer Klinger – who failed to hit their former Get Carter pay dirt with this, their second outing. Nevertheless, the sheer knowing coolness of this bizarre original bears watching. The central theme involving the hiring of a ghostwriter is explored with wit and style, as Hodges deploys his camera cleverly through Maltese locations, and the uncompromising plot makes excellent use of Hollywood icons Mickey Rooney and Lizabeth Scott."

In his Halliwell's Film Guide, film critic Leslie Halliwell said: "Occasionally funny pastiche which sorely lacks shape and is sustained by guest appearances and zany ideas."
