= Feminists: What Were They Thinking? =

2018 documentary film

- Directed by: Johanna Demetrakas
- Produced by: Lisa Remington
- Starring: Laurie Anderson; Phyllis Chesler; Judy Chicago
- Cinematography: Kristy Tully
- Edited by: Kate Amend
- Music by: Lili Haydn
- Distributed by: Netflix
- Release dates: February 9, 2018 (Big Sky Documentary Film Festival); October 12, 2018
- Running time: 86 minutes
- Country: United States
- Language: English

Feminists: What Were They Thinking? is a 2018 documentary film directed by Johanna Demetrakas and starring Laurie Anderson, Phyllis Chesler and Judy Chicago among others. Women of different ages and backgrounds are interviewed by Demetrakas and a team of assistants on the subject of feminism, anchored in the book 'Emergence' with portraits by the photographer Cynthia MacAdams published in 1977. The film was partly funded by the International Documentary Association and also by a crowd funding campaign that raised over $75,000. It was released by Netflix on October 12, 2018.

== Premise ==
In 1977 a book with portraits was released called 'Emergence' by photographer Cynthia MacAdams which captured women embracing feminism by shedding cultural restrictions. The documentary revisits those photos and those women, and contains interviews with women such as Jane Fonda, Lily Tomlin and Judy Chicago, and at the same time tackling topics such as identity, abortion, race, childhood and motherhood.

The film discusses the contribution of films like 9 to 5 and the emergence of feminist artworks like The Dinner Party with some of the people involved. The film does include the significant contribution of Lesbian women to feminism, but it is noted that it missed an opportunity to include trans women. Erika Voeller of Mpls MadWomen notes that the women of color in the documentary express frustration with balancing their multiple identities within the movement but that the documentary misses an opportunity to delve more deeply into intersectional feminism.

== Cast ==
- Laurie Anderson
- Phyllis Chesler
- Judy Chicago
- Jane Fonda
- Funmilola Fagbamila
- Joan Kellerman
- Sally Kirkland
- Celine Kuklowksy
- Wendy J.N. Lee
- Meredith Monk
- Michelle Phillips
- Margaret Prescod
- Catharine Stimpson
- Cheryl Swannack
- Lily Tomlin
- Marcy Vaj
- Anne Waldman
- Zsuzsanna Budapest (as Z. Budapest)
- Aloma Ichinose
- Germaine Greer (archival footage)
- Flo Kennedy (archival footage)
- Susan Brownmiller (archival footage)
- Margo Jefferson (archival footage)
- Kate Millett (archival footage)
- Shirley Chisholm (archival footage)

== Reception ==
Paige Munshell of The Diamondback rated the film 3.5 out of 4 and wrote, "Ironically, this documentary is subject to a common critique of women's art the film itself works to challenge: the brush-away claim that it is too sentimental, too emotional and not a serious work of art. The film is sentimental and emotional, but that doesn't make it unimportant or unworthy of attention... The documentary perfectly balances the old and the new, the ways feminism has grown and the way forward it must continue to march. It fearlessly shows us beauty and ugliness, women who painstakingly created something in a world of men, not to be accepted by them but in defiance of them."

== Release ==
It was released on February 9, 2018 on Netflix streaming.
