= Dorothy Combs Morrison =

American gospel music singer

- Birth name: Dorothy Marie Combs
- Born: May 8, 1944 (age 80); Longview, Texas, U.S.
- Genres: Gospel
- Occupation: Musician
- Instrument: Vocals

Dorothy Combs Morrison (born Dorothy Marie Combs, May 8, 1944) is an American gospel music singer. She sang lead vocal on the song "Oh Happy Day" recorded in 1967 by the Edwin Hawkins Singers.

== Biography ==
She was born in Longview, Texas, and grew up in Richmond, California. The seventh child of ten, Dorothy showed early signs of her talents. She began singing at the age of 13 and released her first single "I Am Free", while singing with her siblings as 'The Combs Family'. Dorothy's continued exposure while appearing with her family at church events led to her talents being noticed by others in the San Francisco and Oakland Bay Area.

In the 1960s, she then joined the Edwin Hawkins Singers and was the lead vocalist on the Grammy Award-winning Hall of Fame hymn, "Oh Happy Day". She toured with Edwin Hawkins, Van Morrison, Boz Scaggs, and Delaney and Bonnie, among others. She appeared on TV shows including The Carol Burnett Show and The Tonight Show Starring Johnny Carson.

Morrison's appearance at the 1969 Big Sur Folk Festival is seen in the film Celebration at Big Sur; with the Combs Sisters, she sang "All God's Children Got Soul", which reached #95 on the Billboard Top 100 in October, 1969. In Canada, her version of "Spirit in the Sky" reached #47 on the RPM Magazine top 100 singles, as well as #99 on Billboard's Hot 100 in October, 1970.

At home in the East Bay area, she performed for the Mayor of Oakland Jerry Brown; in the City Town Square, and in 2002 she was awarded the key to the city of Oakland. She sang on the Huey Lewis and the News cover of "Respect Yourself", released on their 2010 album Soulsville.

Morrison continues as one of the four Blues Broads, with leader Angela Strehli, Annie Sampson, and Tracy Nelson, as of 2019. The Blues Broads are based in Marin County, where Angela Strehli lives and works. Their live November 4, 2011, performance from the Throckmorton Theatre was released as a CD + DVD recording by Delta Groove Productions in 2012. Morrison has toured all over the world with the group.
