= Derek Partridge =

British television presenter, spokesman, voice-over artist and actor

- Born: 29 June 1935 (age 91); London, England, UK
- Occupations: TV spokesman and narrator

Derek Partridge (born 29 June 1935) is a British television presenter, spokesman and voice-over artist, formerly a film and TV actor.

Partridge's father was a diplomat in the British Foreign Service.

In the 1960s, Partridge appeared in a numerous television series and films, including in the 1968 Star Trek episode "Plato's Stepchildren" as Dionyd.

In the 1970s Partridge moved to Rhodesia and presented a number of programmes for Rhodesian Television (RTV), including the popular shows Frankly Partridge and The Kwhizz Kids. He also was employed as a news anchor for RBC. During his time in Rhodesia, Partridge also wrote extensively, including publishing the books Thought-Provoking Thoughts About Living and Rhodesia – As It Really Is, which was later republished under altered titles, and a weekly column in Rhodesia's TV Guide.

In the 1980s Partridge appeared in a number of films and television episodes, including a leading role in the 1981 film Savage Harvest.

Partridge narrated the documentary Leslie Howard: The Man Who Gave a Damn sixty-five years after the downing of BOAC Flight 777, a passenger plane which was shot down by a Luftwaffe patrol on June 1st 1943, killing all 17 aboard including actor Leslie Howard. Partridge was a child at the time, and he and his nanny were removed from Flight 777 to make room for Howard and his travelling companion, who had higher travel priority.

In November 2012, Partridge appeared in a music video for the garage band The Mad Caps. The video for the song "Baby Man" features Partridge as the host of a fictional series entitled Frame by Frame. He introduces the band and serves as a public service announcer halfway through the video .

== Filmography ==
Film

- Incident at Midnight (1963)
- King and Country (1964) - Captain Court Martial
- The High Bright Sun (released as McGuire, Go Home! in the US) (1964) - MP Corporal (uncredited)
- The Murder Game (1965) - Police Sergeant
- Thunderball (1965) - Vulcan Navigator Plotter (uncredited)
- Where the Spies Are (1965) - Duty Officer
- The Killing of Sister George (1968) - Personal Manager (uncredited)
- The Ivory Ape (1980) - Aubrey Range
- Savage Harvest (1981) - Derek
- My Tutor (1983) - Waiter
- The Down Home Alien Blues (2012) - Captain Pietr
- Dearly Departed (2013) - Cedric Longfellow
- Leslie Howard: The Man Who Gave a Damn (2016) – Narrator

Television

- Studio 4 (1962) - Radio Operator
- Dixon of Dock Green (1962) - Doctor / PC Spriggs
- ITV Television Playhouse (1963) - Hector
- More Faces of Jim (1963) - Grigor
- First Night (1963) - Jimmy Green
- Espionage (1964) - Policeman
- The Edgar Wallace Mystery Theatre (1963–64) - Peter / Detective
- The Verdict (1963-1964) - Peter / Detective
- Diary of a Young Man (1964) - German officer
- Night Train to Surbiton (1965) - Policeman
- Star Trek (1968), S3:E10 "Plato's Stepchildren" - Dionyd
- Frankly Partridge (1970s) – host of show
- The Kwhizz Kids (1970s) – host of show
- Remington Steele (1983) - Croupier
- R.S.V.P. (1984) - Governor
- T.J. Hooker (1985) - Croupier
- Dallas (1986) - TV Announcer
- Divorce Court (1987) - Michael Pagent
- Hunter (1987) - Maitre 'D
- Murder, She Wrote (1989) - Doctor
- The Hidden Truth (1993) - host of special
- The Naked Truth (1993) - host of special
- Single & Searching: How to Find the Perfect Person for You (2002) - Himself
- The Indie Pendant (2004) - Himself
- Baby Man by The Mad Caps (2012) - Himself
- Star Wars Rebels (2015) - Admiral Brom Titus
