= Johanna Demetrakas =

American film director

- Born: 1937 (age 87–88)
- Occupations: Filmmaker; television director

Johanna Demetrakas is an American independent filmmaker and television director known for documentaries like Womanhouse and Right Out of History. She has worked as a professor at Cal Arts and USC.

== Career ==
She attended Rhode Island School of Design, where she majored in Illustration. In 1971, Demetrakas co-directed the doc Celebration at Big Sur, which captured performances by Joan Baez, Joni Mitchell, and Dorothy Morrison at the Big Sur Folk Festival. The film was acquired by 20th Century Fox. She followed that up with Womanhouse, a doc about the feminist art installation at Cal Arts.

== Selected filmography ==
- Feminists: What Were They Thinking? (2018)
- Relocation, Arkansas: Aftermath of Incarceration (2016)
- Crazy Wisdom: The Life & Times of Chogyam Trungpa Rinpoche (2011)
- O La La (2010) (short)
- Out of Line (2001)
- Bus Rider's Union (2000)
- Some Nudity Required (1998)
- Homesick (1988) (short)
- The Three Worlds of Bali (1981)
- Right Out of History: The Making of Judy Chicago's Dinner Party (1980)
- Womanhouse (1974)
- Celebration at Big Sur (1971)
