= Secrets of a Married Man =

- Genre: Drama
- Written by: Dennis Nemec
- Directed by: William A. Graham
- Starring: William Shatner; Michelle Phillips; Cybill Shepherd
- Music by: Mark Snow
- Country of origin: United States
- Original language: English

Production
- Executive producer: Tristine Rainer
- Producers: R.W. Goodwin; Dennis Nemec; Judith A. Polone
- Production location: Vancouver
- Cinematography: Robert Steadman
- Editor: Ronald J. Fagan
- Running time: 100 minutes
- Production company: ITC Entertainment

Original release
- Network: NBC
- Release: September 24, 1984

Secrets of a Married Man is a 1984 American made-for-television erotic drama film starring William Shatner, Michelle Phillips and Cybill Shepherd. The film was directed by William A. Graham, written by Dennis Nemec and premiered on NBC on September 24, 1984.

== Plot ==
William Shatner stars as Chris Jordan, a man going through a mid-life crisis. His wife Katie (Michelle Phillips) is attractive, however after having three children, they have lost the prior intimacy in their relationship. Chris begins seeing prostitutes, but after a series of scares involving a sexually transmitted disease and a close scrape with a police sting, he decides to stop and instead attempt to repair his relationship with his wife.

While shopping for lingerie as a gift for his wife, he is approached by Elaine (Cybill Shepherd), another prostitute, and Chris begins an intense relationship with her, resulting in an emotional attachment. Eventually, his dual life begins to unravel as he encounters problems from Elaine's pimp and attempts to hide his behaviour from his family.

== Cast ==
- William Shatner as Chris Jordan
- Michelle Phillips as Katie Jordan
- Glynn Turman as Jesse
- Cybill Shepherd as Elaine
- Jackson Davies as Terry
- Kevin George as Brian
- Dameon Clarke as Alex
