= The Man with Bogart's Face =

1980 film by Robert Day

- US film poster
- Directed by: Robert Day
- Screenplay by: Andrew J. Fenady
- Based on: The Man with Bogart's Face by Andrew J. Fenady
- Produced by: Andrew J. Fenady
- Starring: Robert Sacchi; Franco Nero; Michelle Phillips; Olivia Hussey; Misty Rowe; Victor Buono; Sybil Danning; Herbert Lom
- Cinematography: Richard C. Glouner
- Edited by: Houseley Stevenson Jr.
- Music by: George Duning
- Production company: Melvin Simon Productions
- Distributed by: 20th Century Fox
- Release date: October 3, 1980
- Running time: 106 minutes
- Country: United States
- Language: English
- Budget: $2.0 million
- Box office: $1.5 million (domestic)

The Man with Bogart's Face (also called Sam Marlowe, Private Eye) is a 1980 American comedy film, released by 20th Century Fox and based on a novel of the same title. Andrew J. Fenady, author of the novel, produced the film and wrote the screenplay.

== Plot summary ==
A man calling himself Sam Marlowe has his face altered to resemble that of his idol, Humphrey Bogart, and then opens a detective agency. At first, he and his secretary Duchess have meager business, but things pick up after a shooting puts Sam's picture in the paper. Some ruthless people, including Commodore Alexander and Gena Anastas and Mr. Zebra, who are coincidentally also similar to characters in Bogart films are after a priceless set of blue sapphires called the Eyes of Alexander (from a statue of Alexander the Great), and Marlowe and Duchess are caught in the middle of it all.

== Cast ==
- Robert Sacchi as Sam Marlowe
- Franco Nero as Mustafa Hakim
- Michelle Phillips as Gena Anastas
- Olivia Hussey as Elsa Borsht
- Herbert Lom as Mr. Zebra
- Misty Rowe as Duchess
- Victor Buono as Commodore Alexander Anastas
- Sybil Danning as Cynthia Ashley
- Richard Bakalyan as Lieutenant Bumbera
- Gregg Palmer as Sergeant Hacksaw
- Jay Robinson as Wolf Zinderneuf
- George Raft as Petey Cane
- Yvonne De Carlo as Teresa Anastas
- Mike Mazurki as Himself
- Henry Wilcoxon as Mr. Chevalier
- Victor Sen Yung as Mr. Wing
- Martin Kosleck as Horst Borsht

== Background ==
The film was based on the debut novel by Andrew J. Fenady who wrote it in long hand over 23 days. Fenady had been writer and producer of television shows and movies for 30 years and was always interested in turning it into a film. The name Sam Marlow is taken from two film characters played by Humphrey Bogart: Sam Spade in The Maltese Falcon and Philip Marlowe in The Big Sleep.

In June 1976, it was announced that Fenady's book would be published next January and that a film version would follow. "Whatever the author had in mind does not come off very well", wrote the book critic of The New York Times, adding "the conception and writing are pretty sophomoric". The Los Angeles Times said Fenady "writes well".

The book was popular enough for a sequel The Secret of Sam Marlow: The Further Adventures of the Man with Bogart's Face.

== Production ==
Fenady took the film to Mel Simon who agreed to provide $4 million. Fenady says he wound up not needing all that money and returned $400,000 to Simon. "I'm a Depression baby, I don't believe in wasting money", he said.

The film was made in May 1979 with independently raised finance from Melvin Simon Productions. In September 1979, when the movie was in post-production, 20th Century Fox agreed to pick up all Melvin Simon's movies made in 1979 and 1980 in a deal worth an estimated $10 million. They had a fifty percent interest in Bogart, meaning Fox paid Simon $2 million.

Star Robert Sacchi was noted for his resemblance to Humphrey Bogart and had appeared as Bogart in various roles for over a decade, including various commercials, a Broadway production of Play It Again, Sam. He had toured America for four years in a one-man show Bogie's Back. "I'm just a working guy trying to make an honest living", he said. "I look the way I do and I always have, and there's not much I can do about it. I never had plastic surgery or wore makeup to look like Bogie."

Fenady said he cast another actor in the role until Sacchi walked in, after which the producer "went into shock. Bob doesn't need to do an impersonation. The physical impact is enough. When he began talking, I knew I had Bogart."

During the filming of one scene, a boat hit John Wayne's converted minesweeper, the Wild Goose. Appearing in this film are screen veterans George Raft (in his last film role), Jay Robinson, Henry Wilcoxon, Victor Sen Yung (who had appeared with Bogart in Across the Pacific), Victor Buono, Yvonne De Carlo, Mike Mazurki, and Franco Nero.

== Reception ==
The film debuted at the 1980 Cannes Film Festival and was released in Europe before debuting in the US.

The New York Times called it "an intelligent, amiable and often amusing spoof of Humphrey Bogart and the roles he played" although "everyone is so cool that there are moments when the picture seems about to drift off the screen". The Los Angeles Times wrote: "[...] all of Fenady's boundless affection for Bogart and vintage movies is not enough to make The Man with Bogart's Face (PG) come fully alive." The storyline has been noted for its resemblance to the 1947 film Dark Passage, in which the character portrayed by Bogart undergoes plastic surgery to alter his appearance to that of Bogart himself.

The film won the Golden Raspberry Award for Worst Original Song for "The Man with Bogart's Face" at the 1st Golden Raspberry Awards.

== Home media ==
The film was released on DVD by Image Entertainment on July 10, 2007.
