= Savage Harvest =

- Directed by: Robert L. Collins
- Written by: Ralph Helfer; Ken Noyle; Robert Blees
- Story by: Ralph Helfer; Ken Noyle
- Produced by: Ralph Helfer; Sandy Howard; Lamar Card
- Starring: Tom Skerritt; Michelle Phillips; Shawn Stevens; Anne-Marie Martin; Derek Partridge; Tana Helfer
- Cinematography: Ronnie Taylor
- Music by: Robert Folk
- Production company: Dysan International
- Distributed by: 20th Century Fox (United States and Canada); United Artists (International)
- Release date: May 1, 1981
- Running time: 86 minutes
- Country: United States
- Language: English
- Box office: $2-3 million

Savage Harvest is a 1981 American action-adventure natural horror film directed by Robert L. Collins and starring Tom Skerritt, Michelle Phillips, Shawn Stevens, Anne-Marie Martin, Derek Partridge and Tana Helfer.

== Plot ==
A family in Africa is besieged by a pride of ravenous lions, driven to desperation by the drought. They have to survive multiple attacks but some colleagues are eaten by the lions.

== Cast ==
- Tom Skerritt as Casey
- Michelle Phillips as Maggie
- Shawn Stevens as Jon
- Anne-Marie Martin as Wendy
- Derek Partridge as Derek
- Tana Helfer as Kristie
- Arthur Malet as MacGruder
- Vincent J. Isaac as Jurogi (credited as Vincent Isaac)
- Eva Kirrita as Tantsi
- Bill Okwirry as Yumadi
- Abdulla Sunado as Katinga
- Levit Tereria as Asian
- Philip Chege as Customs Officer
- Greg Odhambo as Wireless Operator
- René Le Vant as Alayo

== Filming ==
The production of the film was recorded in Brazil and Kenya.

== Cast notes ==
Tana Helfer, who played the role of daughter Kristie, is the daughter of producer and animal trainer Ralph Helfer.

== See also ==
- Roar, a film released in the same year featuring a similar story.
