= The Covenant (1985 film) =

Television film by Walter Grauman

- Promotional artwork
- Written by: Dan DiStefano; J.D. Feigelson
- Directed by: Walter Grauman
- Starring: Jane Badler; Kevin Conroy; Judy Parfitt; Michelle Phillips; José Ferrer
- Country of origin: United States
- Original language: English

Production
- Producer: Joseph B. Wallenstein
- Cinematography: James Crabe
- Editor: Sidney Katz
- Running time: 71 minutes
- Production companies: Filerman Productions; 20th Century Fox Television

Original release
- Network: NBC
- Release: August 5, 1985

The Covenant is a 1985 American horror television film directed by Walter Grauman and starring Jane Badler, Kevin Conroy, Judy Parfitt, Michelle Phillips, and José Ferrer. Its plot follows a group of people attempting to stop a powerful, Satanic family controlling the world's banks. The film premiered on NBC on August 5, 1985.

== Cast ==
- Jane Badler as Dana Noble
- Kevin Conroy as Stephen
- Charles Frank as David Wyman
- Whitney Kershaw as Angelica Noble
- Barry Morse as Zachariah
- Judy Parfitt as Renata Beck
- Michelle Phillips as Claire Noble
- José Ferrer as Victor Noble
- Bradford Dillman as Eric Noble
- Laurence Guittard as Stuart Hall
- Lenore Kasdorf as Cathy Resnick
- John Van Dreelen as Heinrich Bosch
- Jan Merlin as Karl
- Ji-Tu Cumbuka as Duboff

== Sources ==
- Young, R. G. (2000). The Encyclopedia of Fantastic Film: Ali Baba to Zombies. Hal Leonard Corporation. ISBN 1-55783-269-2.
