= Oh Happy Day =

Song by Edwin Hawkins Singers

Single by Edwin Hawkins Singers

from the album Let Us Go Into the House of the Lord
- B-side: "Jesus, Lover of My Soul"
- Released: 1968 (April 1969, U.S.)
- Recorded: 1967
- Studio: Ephesian Church of God in Christ, Berkeley, California, U.S.
- Genre: Gospel; urban contemporary gospel
- Length: 4:59
- Label: Pavilion/Buddah
- Songwriters: Edwin Hawkins, based on 1775 hymn
- Producer: Edwin Hawkins

Edwin Hawkins Singers singles chronology
"Oh Happy Day" (1968)	"All God's Children Got Soul" (1969)

Official audio
- "Oh Happy Day" on YouTube

"Oh Happy Day" is a 1967 gospel music arrangement of the 1755 hymn by clergyman Philip Doddridge. Recorded by the Edwin Hawkins Singers, it became an international hit in 1969, reaching No. 4 on the US Singles Chart, No. 1 in France, Germany, and the Netherlands and No. 2 on the Canadian Singles Chart, UK Singles Chart, and Irish Singles Chart. It has since become a gospel music standard, selling over 7 million copies worldwide, making it the second best-selling gospel song of all time.

The recording begins with a muted piano, drum, and bass, backing lead singer Dorothy Combs Morrison on the left-hand stereo channel, then alternates twice with a full-throated chorus that includes a large ensemble, rising to a crescendo with handclaps, and ending with a return to the muted sound as at the beginning. The track is notable for its clear sound given the powerful vocals and the modest equipment used to capture them. It was made at Hawkins' church, the Ephesian Church of God in Christ in Berkeley, California.

== Origins ==
The gospel style arrangement of the hymn "Oh, Happy Day" by Edwin Hawkins has a long pedigree. It began as a hymn, written in the mid-18th century ("O happy day, that fixed my choice"), by English clergyman Philip Doddridge (based on Acts 8:35) set to a 1704 melody by J. A. Freylinghausen. By the mid-19th century it had been given a new melody by Edward F. Rimbault, who also added a chorus, and was commonly used for baptismal or confirmation ceremonies in the UK and USA. The 20th century saw its adaptation from 3/4 to 4/4 time and this new arrangement by Hawkins, which contains only the repeated Rimbault refrain, with all of the original verses being omitted.

The B-side of the single was Hawkins' own modern arrangement of "Jesus, Lover of My Soul" originally written by Charles Wesley in 1740.

== Recording ==
Hawkins rearranged the hymn to give it more of a gospel feel, and devised a piano introduction which he said was influenced by the music of Sérgio Mendes. When the choir made the recording in 1967, lead singer Dorothy Morrison added some lyrical improvisations influenced by James Brown, which, she said, "made the song feel even more current".

== Legacy and influence ==
Hawkins' arrangement quickly became a "standard" and has been recorded by hundreds of artists. It was included on the RIAA Songs of the Century list and won Hawkins a Grammy Award for Best Soul Gospel Performance in 1970 (performed by the Edwin Hawkins Singers).

In 2005, "Oh Happy Day" was one of 50 recordings chosen that year by the Library of Congress to be added to the National Recording Registry.

In live performances and acoustic versions of the Nick Cave song "Deanna" (1988), portions of "Oh Happy Day" are included, revealing the inspiration for Cave's song. George Harrison has stated the song was a primary inspiration in the writing of his 1970 international hit single "My Sweet Lord."

The song has appeared in many movies, beginning with the German film Seventeen and Anxious in 1970, but most notably Whoopi Goldberg's Sister Act 2, with then 14-year-old Ryan Toby singing lead. The song also appears in Big Momma's House, Nutty Professor II: The Klumps, David LaChapelle's 2005 movie Rize, Robin Williams’s 2007 movie License to Wed, the 2010 biographical film produced by Walt Disney Pictures: Secretariat (played when Secretariat wins the Belmont), and Spike Lee's BlacKkKlansman.

The Edwin Hawkins Singers' performance of the song at the 1969 Harlem Cultural Festival appears in the 2021 music documentary, Summer of Soul.

The song is regularly performed by space-rock band Spiritualized as the last song of their live sets.

== Personnel ==
- Dorothy Combs Morrison – lead vocal
- Edwin Hawkins – choir director, arranger, piano
- Betty Watson – co-director, soprano vocals
- Choir Members – Walter Hawkins, Tramaine Hawkins, Elaine Kelly, Margarette Branch, Rueben Franklin, Donald Cashmere, Ruth Lyons and 40 others
- Drums, bass and percussion – unconfirmed (probably Bennie Bolton, drums, and Harley White, bass.)
- Recorded live at the Ephesian Church of God in Christ, Berkeley, California

The song was also included on the album Let Us Go Into the House of the Lord (1968). The album reached No. 19 in Canada. It was released as a 7-inch single on Pavilion Records in April 1969, then on the Buddah Records album It's a Happy Day also in 1969.

== Chart performance ==
=== Weekly charts ===
Weekly chart performance for "Oh Happy Day"
Chart (1968–1969)	Peak position
Australian (Kent Music Report)	19
Austria (Ö3 Austria Top 40)	2
Belgium (Ultratop 50 Flanders)	3
Belgium (Ultratop 50 Wallonia)	1
Canada Adult Contemporary (RPM)	6
Canada Top Singles (RPM)	2
France (SNEP)	1
Germany (GfK)	1
Ireland (IRMA)	2
Netherlands (Dutch Top 40)	1
Netherlands (Single Top 100)	1
New Zealand (NZ Listener)	20
South Africa (Springbok Radio)	13
Switzerland (Schweizer Hitparade)	1
UK Singles (Official Charts)	2
US Billboard Hot 100	4
US Adult Contemporary (Billboard)	22
US Hot R&B/Hip-Hop Songs (Billboard)	2
US Cash Box Top 100	3

=== Year-end charts ===
Year-end chart performance for "Oh Happy Day"
Chart (1969)	Rank
Canada	75
Germany	2
UK	36
UK International Single Disc (Melody Maker)	3
UK (Record Mirror)	42
US Billboard Hot 100	93
US R&B (Billboard)	28
US Cash Box	78

== Awards ==
- 1970 Grammy Award for Best Soul Gospel Performance

== Other notable versions ==
- Joan Baez performed the song at Woodstock in 1969.
- Glen Campbell covered it on his 1970 album Oh Happy Day. The single reached No. 45 on the U.S. Billboard Hot 100, No. 7 Adult Contemporary, and No. 44 in Canada.
- Aretha Franklin included it on her 1987 album One Lord, One Faith, One Baptism.
- Club Nouveau recorded it for their 1992 album A New Beginning. The single charted at No. 45 on the US R&B Chart.
- Elvis Presley performed the song as part of one of the rehearsals for his August 1970 Las Vegas residency concerts. The recorded performance was featured in the 2026 documentary EPiC: Elvis Presley in Concert, as well as on the film's soundtrack.

== Certifications ==
Region	Certification	Certified units/sales
United States (RIAA)	Gold	1,000,000^{^}
^{^} Shipments figures based on certification alone.
