= Big Sur Folk Festival =

Music festival held from 1964 to 1971

- Poster for the initial festival in 1964 by Bob Muson
- Genre: Folk
- Dates: June 21, 1964; September 13–14, 1965; July 10, 1966; June 28–29, 1967; September 8–9, 1968; September 13–14, 1969; October 3, 1970; September 25, 1971
- Locations: Big Sur and Monterey, California
- Years active: 1965-1971
- Founders: Nancy Carlen

The Big Sur Folk Festival, held from 1964 to 1971 in California, was an informal gathering of prominent and emerging folk artists from across the United States. Nancy Jane Carlen (1941–2013) was working at the Esalen Institute when Joan Baez was asked to lead workshops on music. Carlen was a good friend of Baez, and they decided to invite other artists, which turned into the first festival.

Baez performed at all seven events. Well-known acts included Joni Mitchell, Judy Collins, the Beach Boys, Crosby, Stills, Nash & Young, Country Joe McDonald, John Sebastian, Kris Kristofferson, Arlo Guthrie, Blood, Sweat & Tears, Taj Mahal, Dorothy Morrison with the Edwin Hawkins Singers, and Julie Payne. All of the artists were paid union scale, about $50. The audience paid $3.50 to $5.50, depending on the year. All proceeds benefited Baez's Institute for the Study of Nonviolence.

Carlen intended it to be a friendly and low-key event that allowed artists to relax after their long summer concert series. It was held except for one year in front of the pool at the Esalen Institute on the Big Sur coast. The second-to-last year was held at the Monterey County Fairgrounds. Carlen purposefully kept advertising to a minimum to help keep crowds small. Richard and Mimi Fariña performed for the first time at the festival, which led to a recording contract.

At the September 1969 festival, a documentary film was made. Celebration at Big Sur featured many performers who had played only four weeks earlier at Woodstock from August 15–18. The festival was later considered by some as the antithesis of the commercial Woodstock, but it was originally seen by the artists as an antidote to the Newport Folk Festival.

== Founding ==
The festival was founded in 1964 by Nancy Carlen. She was attending Boston University when she met Joan Baez. Baez at the time lived in Carmel Valley. Impressed with Baez' music and social convictions, Nancy drove cross-country and arrived in Big Sur in 1961. She got a job at Esalen and began living there.

Carlen wrote that the festival "started as a lark, Esalen Institute offering us a chance to take over that magnificent place for a whole weekend–the catch–an Esalen style seminar on "The New Folk Music". She invited Baez to lead the workshop. Carlen had met Richard and Mimi Farina at a mutual friend's home. She brainstormed ideas for the festival with Richard and invited both of them. It was their first professional performance.

Well, any time you found Joan Baez, Richard and Mimi Fariña, and me in the same place there had to be singing, so instead of meetings and lectures, sing we did, in the sulphur baths, on the lawns, even during meals sitting at long wooden tables in the lodge. Sunday afternoon we invited the neighborhood in general to join us, turned the deck of the Esalen swimming pool into a stage, and sang to everyone.

Carlen invited Malvina Reynolds, Mark Spoelstra, Roger Abraham, and local artists Janet Smith and Richard and Mimi Fariña. Carlen performed as well. Carlen later said she intended the festival to be a "performers' festival," where the artists could enjoy some peace and solitude together after the long summer on the festival circuit.

The audience liked Mimi and Dick Fariña so much that three record companies offered the duo a recording contract. Since Richard already had a publishing contract with folk giant Vanguard, and since Mimi's sister Joan had done well in her contract with Vanguard, they signed with them.

== Later concerts ==
The festival was held annually from 1964 through 1969 at the Esalen Institute in Big Sur. In 1970 it moved to the Monterey County Fairgrounds, and returned to Esalen for the last concert in 1971.

As the seminar evolved into full concerts, Carlen kept the events purposefully small, emphasizing "quality and atmosphere over publicity and commercial success". Even when well-known artists like the Beach Boys or Crosby, Stills, Nash & Young were scheduled to perform, Carlen kept attendance to no more than a few thousand. She preferred crowds of less than 6000, preferably 3000. In 1971, she paid for no advertising and issued no tickets, only invitations. She paid performers union scale, never more than $50 per person. The admission charge was $3.50 to $5.50, depending on the year. For security, she used members of Baez' Institute for the Study of Nonviolence.

From 1964 to 1971, the Big Sur Folk Festival featured a line up of emerging and established artists, including Joan Baez, Joni Mitchell, Judy Collins, the Beach Boys, Crosby, Stills, Nash and Young, Country Joe McDonald, John Sebastian, Kris Kristofferson, Arlo Guthrie, Dorothy Morrison with the Edwin Hawkins Singers, Julie Payne, and Mimi Farina. During the October 1970 festival, Kristofferson learned that Janis Joplin, with whom he had been involved, had died of an overdose in Los Angeles.

At Esalen, the audience sat on the grass in front of the swimming pool, and the artists performed on the other side of the pool with the Pacific Ocean in the distance. In 1968 the audience totaled around 5,000 each day. In September, 1970, the crowd at the Monterey County Fairgrounds numbered six or seven thousand.

The Beach Boys' performance at the 1970 festival at the Monterey County Fairgrounds helped establish their place as a rock and roll band, and their importance as a live act. Manager Jack Riley claimed that their appearance at the festival led to the invitation to play Carnegie Hall soon afterward. A recording of "Wouldn't It Be Nice" was included on a Live at Big Sur Folk Festival single and album.

Although the event is sometimes now regarded as the antithesis of the grossly commercial Woodstock, it was originally seen as antidote to the Newport Folk Festival.

== Documentary film ==
A documentary film, Celebration at Big Sur, was made about the September 13 and 14, 1969 Big Sur festival, which featured many performers who had played at Woodstock a few weeks earlier from August 15–18. The Los Angeles Herald Examiner reported that the performers donated their time for the concert and film in exchange for a portion of the net profits. The Daily Variety reported in April 1970 that the film's profits were divided between the Big Sur Folk Festival Foundation (88%) and the crew (12%). Another source reported that Baez' Institute for the Study of Nonviolence benefited from the film's profits.

About 10–15,000 people camped out for three miles up and down Highway One for the two-day festival. The event audience was so well-mannered that those without the $4.00 admission price listened from the highway, even though there was no gate.

== Performance dates and artists ==
The following artists performed from 1965 to 1971:

First Big Sur Folk Festival

Sunday, June 21, 1964

- Joan Baez
- Roger Abraham
- Nancy Carlen
- Malvina Reynolds
- Mark Spoelstra
- Janet Smith
- Mimi & Richard Fariña

Second Big Sur Folk Festival

September 13–14, 1965

- Joan Baez
- The Incredible String Band
- John Sebastian
- Delanie and Bonnie
- Dorothy Morrison and the Comb Sisters

Third Big Sur Folk Festival

Sunday, July 10, 1966

- Joan Baez
- Judy Collins
- Mark Spoelstra
- Malvina Reynolds
- Nancy Carlen
- Al Kooper
- Mimi Fariña

Fourth Big Sur Folk Festival

June 28–29, 1967

- Joan Baez
- Judy Collins
- Mark Spoelstra
- Jade the Mad Muse (?)
- Chambers Brothers
- Mimi Fariña
- Al Kooper

Fifth Big Sur Folk Festival

September 8–9, 1968

- Joan Baez
- Judy Collins
- Mimi Fariña
- Arlo Guthrie
- Charles River Valley Boys

Sixth Big Sur Folk Festival

September 13–14, 1969

- Joan Baez
- Joni Mitchell
- Crosby, Stills, Nash & Young
- John Sebastian
- Johanna Demetrakas
- Dorothy Morrison & the Edwin Hawkins Singers
- Mimi Fariña
- Julie Payne
- Ruthann Friedman
- Carol Ann Cisneros
- The Comb Sisters
- Chris Ethridge
- Flying Burrito Brothers
- Struggle Mountain Resistance Band

Seventh Big Sur Folk Festival

Saturday, October 3, 1970
Held at Monterey County Fairgrounds

1:00 pm concert:

- The Beach Boys
- John Phillips
- Joan Baez
- Merry Clayton and Love Ltd.
- Kris Kristofferson
- John Hartford

8:00 pm concert:

- The Beach Boys
- John Phillips
- Linda Ronstadt, with Swamp Water
- Mimi Fariña & Tom Jans
- Mark Spoelstra
- Country Joe McDonald
- Tom Ghent
- Joan Baez

Finale: All sing You Ain't Going Nowhere

Eighth (and final) Big Sur Folk Festival

Saturday, September 25, 1971

- Joan Baez
- Kris Kristofferson
- Mimi Fariña and Tom Jans
- Mickey Newbury
- Big Sur Choir
- Lily Tomlin & Larry Hankin
- Blood, Sweat and Tears

== Merchandise ==
Posters produced by Bob Muson and other artists are now collectable. Few were made as the festival was not widely advertised and very few posters remain in existence. A poster for the third Big Sur Folk Festival in 1966 sold in 2014 for $700.

== Recordings and media ==
- "California Saga: California", a single by the Beach Boys on their 1973 album Holland.
- "Wouldn't It Be Nice" by the Beach Boys, released on Celebration and as a single in 1971.
- Celebration at Big Sur, film, 1971. From the 1969 festival.
- Celebration, album, 1970. From the 1970 festival. (CD released only in Europe)
- One Hand Clapping, album, 1971. From the 1971 festival. (Not available on CD) Columbia, 1972, New York, N.Y.
- Live at the Big Sur Folk Festival, Kris Kristofferson 2016, 37min
