= Michelle Phillips =

American singer and actress (born 1944)

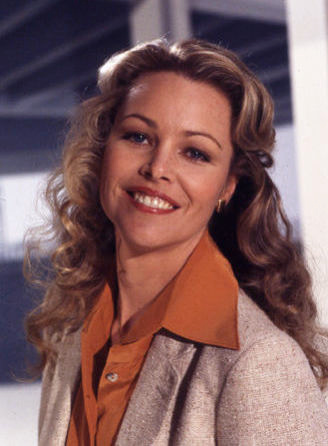
- Phillips in 1977
- Born: Holly Michelle Gilliam; June 4, 1944 (age 82); Long Beach, California, U.S.
- Occupations: Singer; songwriter; actress
- Years active: 1965–2009
- Spouses: John Phillips (m. 1962; div. 1969) Dennis Hopper (m. 1970; div. 1970) Robert Burch (m. 1978; div. 1979)
- Partners: Grainger Hines (1981–1984); Geoffrey Tozer (1987–1996); Steven Zax (1999–2017; his death)
- Children: 3, including Chynna Phillips
- Musical career
- Genres: Folk rock; psychedelic pop; sunshine pop
- Instrument: Vocals
- Label: A&M
- Formerly of: The Mamas & the Papas

Holly Michelle Phillips (née Gilliam; born June 4, 1944) is an American former singer, songwriter, and actress. Described by Time magazine as the "purest soprano in pop music", she rose to fame in the mid-1960s with the folk rock vocal group the Mamas & the Papas. After their disbandment, she started a successful acting career in film and television in the 1970s.

A native of Long Beach, California, she spent her early life in Los Angeles and Mexico City, raised by her widowed father. While working as a model in San Francisco, she met and married John Phillips in 1962 and went on to co-found the Mamas & the Papas in 1965. The band rose to fame with their popular singles "California Dreamin' " and "Creeque Alley", both of which she co-wrote. They released five studio albums before their dissolution in 1970. While married to John Phillips, she gave birth to their daughter, singer Chynna Phillips. Michelle Phillips is the last surviving original member of the band.

After the breakup of the Mamas & the Papas and her divorce from John Phillips, she transitioned into acting, appearing in a supporting part in The Last Movie (1971) before being cast as Billie Frechette in the critically acclaimed crime biopic Dillinger (1973), for which she was nominated for a Golden Globe Award for Most Promising Newcomer. In 1974, she had lead roles in two television films: the crime feature The Death Squad, and the teen drama The California Kid, in the latter of which she starred opposite Martin Sheen. She went on to appear in a number of films throughout the remainder of the 1970s, including Ken Russell's Valentino (1977), playing Natacha Rambova, and the thriller Bloodline (1979). She released her only solo album, Victim of Romance, in 1977.

Phillips's first film of the 1980s was the comedy The Man with Bogart's Face (1980). The next year she co-starred with Tom Skerritt in the nature-themed horror Savage Harvest (1981), followed by the television films Secrets of a Married Man (1984) and The Covenant (1985). In 1987, she joined the series Knots Landing, portraying Anne Matheson, the mother of Paige Matheson (portrayed by Nicollette Sheridan), until the series's 1993 conclusion.

Phillips later had supporting roles in the comedy film Let It Ride (1989) and the psychological thriller Scissors (1991). In 1998, she was inducted into the Rock and Roll Hall of Fame as a member of the Mamas & the Papas. Phillips appeared in independent films in the 2000s, with supporting parts in Jane White Is Sick and Twisted (2002) and Kids in America (2005) and had recurring guest roles in the television series That's Life (2001–2002) and 7th Heaven (2001–2004).

== Early life ==
Phillips was born Holly Michelle Gilliam on June 4, 1944, in Long Beach, California, the second child of Joyce Leone (née Poole), a Canadian-born accountant, and Gardner Burnett Gilliam, a merchant mariner from San Diego. She had one older sister, Russell Ann. Phillips's paternal grandfather, Marcus Gilliam, was from Walla Walla, Washington, and worked as a miner and hotelier in Erie, British Columbia. Gilliam County, Oregon, takes its name from her paternal ancestors. Her mother suffered heart problems stemming from a childhood bout with rheumatic fever, including subacute endocarditis, and died of a related Intracerebral hemorrhage when Phillips was five years old. Reflecting on her mother's illness, Phillips said: "They knew it was only a matter of time ... She would lie on the couch in the evenings, listening as my father read to her. One night, after my sister and I had been put to bed, my mother just raised her head, fell unconscious on the couch, and that was it."

Following his wife's death, Phillips's father, wanting a change of scenery, relocated the family to Buffalo, New York, where they lived for nine months while he worked as a bartender. They subsequently returned to California, settling in Pasadena. In June 1951, two days after Phillips's seventh birthday, the family relocated again to Mexico City, where her father had enrolled to study sociology on the GI Bill at Mexico City College. Phillips spent the following six years in Mexico, where she attended public schools and became fluent in Spanish. Throughout her childhood, Spanish remained Phillips's primary written language, though she later learned to write in English. She resided with her father and sister in the Roma Sur district of Cuauhtémoc. Phillips recalled that her and her sister's experiences living in a different culture "helped us get over my mother's death, and instead of grieving, we became very strong, independent, and free".

At the age of 13, Phillips returned to the United States with her father and sister, settling again in Los Angeles. There, she became a childhood friend of Sue Lyon. Phillips attended several high schools in Los Angeles, including Alexander Hamilton High School and Marshall High School. While a student, Phillips played several sports and studied piano, guitar, and cello. During her sophomore year, after being caught skipping classes and subsequently forging absence permission slips, Phillips was expelled from Marshall High School and transferred to Eagle Rock High School.

In mid-1961, at age 17, Phillips relocated to San Francisco to live with her friend Tamar Hodel and began working as a model. She appeared on a billboard advertising Lucky Lager beer and in print ads for Cole bathing suits. Phillips quickly became immersed in San Francisco's countercultural music scene and nightlife, recalling: "Tamar and I loved going out and showing off. We had a friend, Eddie, Tamar's hairdresser, who was a flaming homosexual and proud of it. Remember that this was early for gays to be obvious. Eddie was the first I knew and loved who was blatant. He loved to do our hair and make my face up and dress me ... We didn't always have a lot of money, but I only once went to bed hungry." At a club in San Francisco in July 1961, she met John Phillips while he was touring California with his band the Journeymen, and the two began a whirlwind romance. He divorced his first wife and married Michelle on December 31, 1962, when she was 18 years old.

== Career ==
=== 1965–1969: The Mamas and the Papas ===
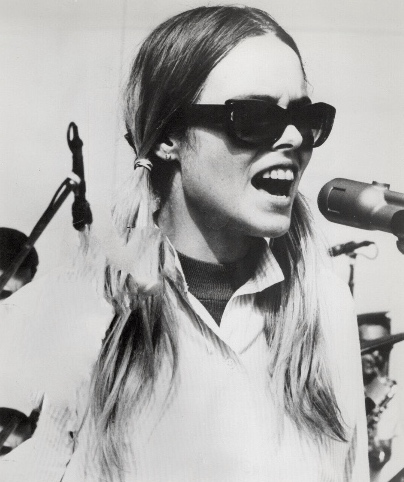
Phillips performing with the Mamas & the Papas, circa 1966

The Phillips newlyweds relocated to New York City, where they began writing songs together and formed the Mamas and the Papas in 1965. Michelle co-wrote some of the band's hits, including "California Dreamin'", which appears on the group's debut album, If You Can Believe Your Eyes and Ears (1966).

Recording of the Mamas and the Papas' second album, titled The Mamas and the Papas (1966) was interrupted when Michelle Phillips' affair with Gene Clark of the Byrds was revealed. An affair the previous year between Phillips and bandmate Denny Doherty had been forgiven; Doherty and John Phillips had reconciled and ostensibly written "I Saw Her Again" (1966) about the episode, although they later disagreed about how much Doherty had contributed to the song. This time, John Phillips was determined to fire his wife. After consulting their attorney and record label, John Phillips, Cass Elliot, and Denny Doherty served Michelle Phillips with a letter expelling her from the group on June 4, 1966. However, she was rehired on August 23 after the remaining band members concluded that her replacement, Jill Gibson, lacked her predecessor's "stage charisma and grittier edge". After Phillips's reinstatement, the band embarked on a brief tour of the East Coast, playing a series of shows in Washington, D.C., Baltimore, and at Fordham University in New York City.

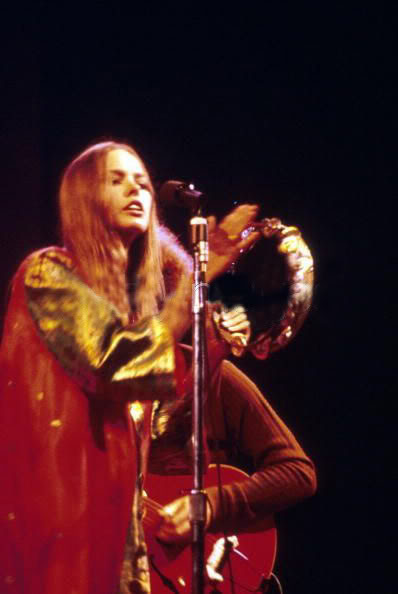
Phillips performing with the Mamas & the Papas at the Monterey Pop Festival, 1967

After returning to California and settling in Los Angeles, the group recorded their third album, The Mamas & The Papas Deliver (1967). In June 1967, Phillips performed with the group at the Monterey Pop Festival in Monterey, California, an event organized by John Phillips and Lou Adler. The festival also featured other prominent California-based counterculture musicians and psychedelic rock acts, including Jefferson Airplane, Big Brother and the Holding Company (featuring Janis Joplin) and Jimi Hendrix. Recounting the experience, Phillips said: "[It was like] a Renaissance Fair. It was convenient for the artists and the audience. Practically everyone had a seat, and if not, people were lining up against the fence, and they could see and hear. Or people were sitting outside, you could hear it outside, too ... It was lovely."

In August 1967, the band played what would be their final live performance at the Hollywood Bowl. Phillips would go on to record a fourth and final album with the band, The Papas & The Mamas (1968), before going on a hiatus. In February 1968, she gave birth to their daughter, Chynna Phillips, who later became a vocalist with the 1990s pop trio Wilson Phillips. Michelle and John, whose marriage was failing at the time, filed for divorce in a Los Angeles County court in May 1969. The Mamas and the Papas officially disbanded in 1971 before the release of their final album, People Like Us, which was recorded to fulfill contract obligations with their record label.

In 1969, Phillips had a brief affair with director Roman Polanski, while his pregnant wife Sharon Tate was filming in Rome. After the Tate-LaBianca murders, Polanski wrongly suspected that John Phillips had orchestrated the killings as an act of revenge.

=== 1970–1976: Transition to acting ===
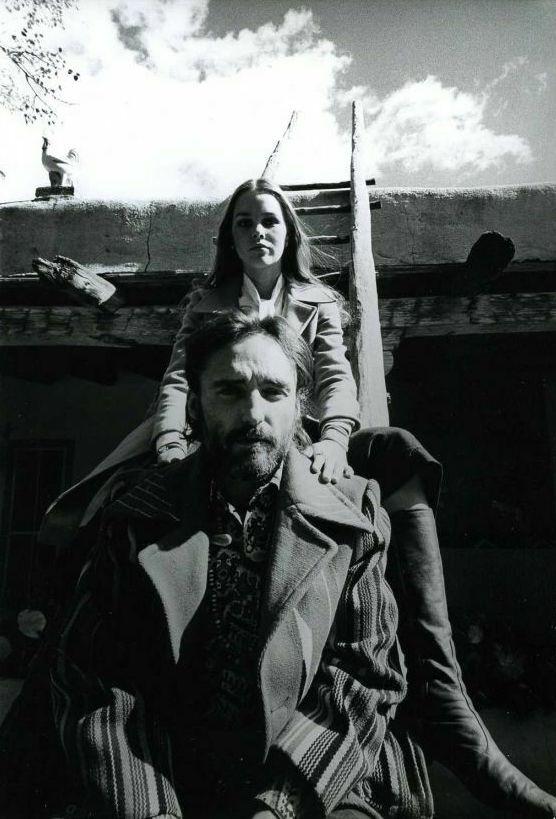
Phillips with Dennis Hopper in Taos, New Mexico, 1970, during editing of The Last Movie

In 1969, while still a member of the Mamas and the Papas, Phillips acted in Gram Parsons's science fiction film Saturation 70 alongside Nudie Cohn, Anita Pallenberg, and Julian Jones, the five-year-old son of Rolling Stones guitarist Brian Jones. The film was never finished, and became a lost film. The following year, after the breakup of the Mamas and the Papas, she enrolled in acting classes in Los Angeles and has said that she had intended to start her acting career "from scratch", stating that the royalties from the band's records provided her a sustained income while she began to venture into film. She studied acting with Peggy Feury.

Phillips's first film role came in Dennis Hopper's film The Last Movie (1971), in a minor part; she and Hopper married on October 31, 1970, shortly after the production, but the union lasted only eight days. Two years later, she was cast in a lead role in the thriller film Dillinger (1973) as John Dillinger's girlfriend, Billie Frechette. Phillips claimed she got cast by pretending to be half Cherokee, like her character. The film was critically acclaimed, and Variety said of her performance: "Phillips, making her film bow after having been a member of the Mamas & the Papas singing group, scores heavily as Dillinger's girlfriend", while the New York Times noted it as "mildly effective". Phillips was nominated for a Golden Globe Award for Most Promising Newcomer for her performance. Reflecting on the film, Phillips said: "I was so lucky to have been surrounded by really great actors. Everybody in that movie was a real actor: Warren Oates, Ben Johnson, Cloris Leachman, Richard Dreyfuss, Harry Dean Stanton. It was just a wonderful, wonderful experience for me and I had so much support and so much help and so much encouragement. That was really my first movie. Dennis' movie [The Last Movie] was a lot of improvisation and craziness." Phillips remained a lifelong friend of co-star Stanton.

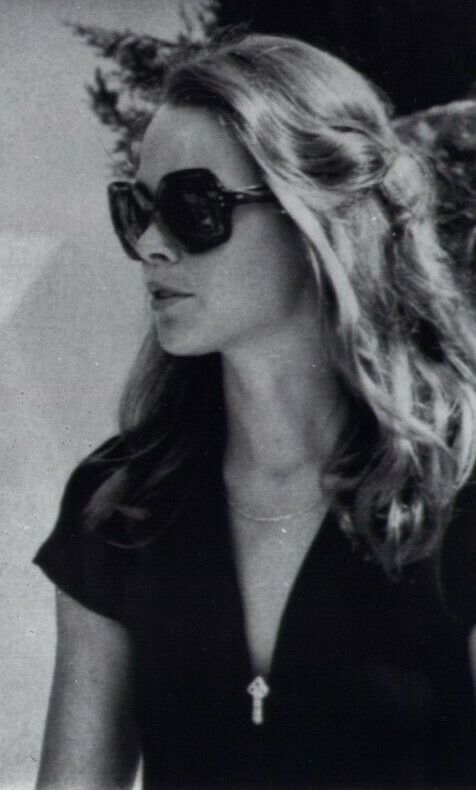
Phillips attending Cass Elliot's funeral, August 1974

That same year, Phillips recorded vocals as a cheerleader along with Darlene Love for the Cheech & Chong single Basketball Jones, which peaked at No 15 on the Billboard singles chart. In 1974, she was featured in the action-horror television film The California Kid opposite Martin Sheen. She had a cameo appearance in a party scene with then-boyfriend Warren Beatty in Shampoo (1975). She would later state that she considered Beatty the love of her life. In 1975, Phillips signed a solo recording contract with A&M Records and released a promo single, "Aloha Louie," a song she wrote with ex-husband John Phillips. Phillips released her first solo single in 1976, "No Love Today", which appeared on the Mother, Jugs & Speed movie soundtrack.

=== 1977–1986: Solo album, film, and writing ===
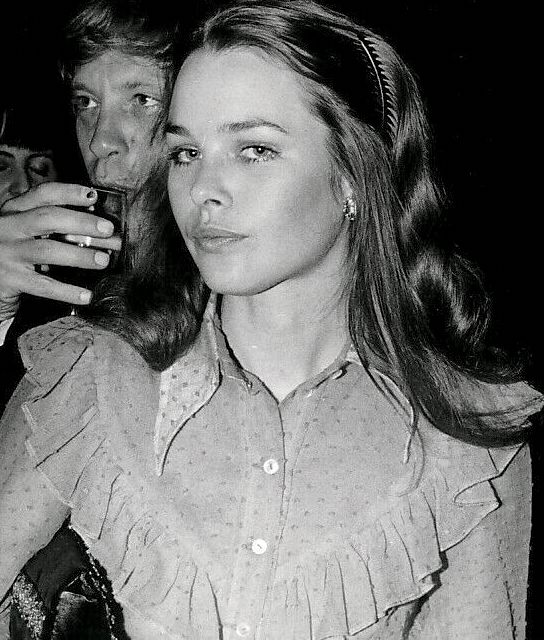
Phillips at the 1971 Golden Globe Awards

In 1977, Phillips released her only solo album, Victim of Romance, produced by Jack Nitzsche for A&M Records. Commenting on the record, she said: "I didn't do it earlier because I never felt secure enough as a vocalist. I'm good, but Cass was always better." Phillips also commented on her involvement in its production, saying that she had been involved in "every aspect, from mixing to putting together the package and cover myself". Her first two solo singles from the album failed to make the U.S. music charts. Concurrent with her solo album release, she sang backup vocals with former stepdaughter Mackenzie Phillips on "Zulu Warrior" for her ex-husband's second solo album, Pay Pack & Follow. Around the same time, she starred as Rudolph Valentino's second wife Natacha Rambova in Ken Russell's film Valentino (1977). The film received mixed reviews, with Time Out London saying: "Structured as a series of flashbacks from Valentino's funeral to his early years in America, the first hour or so of this biopic is Russell's sanest and most controlled work in several years, despite its hollow cynicism." The following year, Phillips married radio executive Robert Burch, though their marriage ended in 1979.

In 1979, she appeared in the film adaptation of the Sidney Sheldon novel Bloodline (1979), a thriller starring Audrey Hepburn and Ben Gazzara. Released in June 1979, Bloodline received negative reviews from critics, and Phillips's performance (along with those of James Mason and Maurice Ronet) was criticized by Variety as being "drab". The same year, she recorded the song Forever for the movie soundtrack of California Dreaming, a surf film unrelated to her former group despite its title.

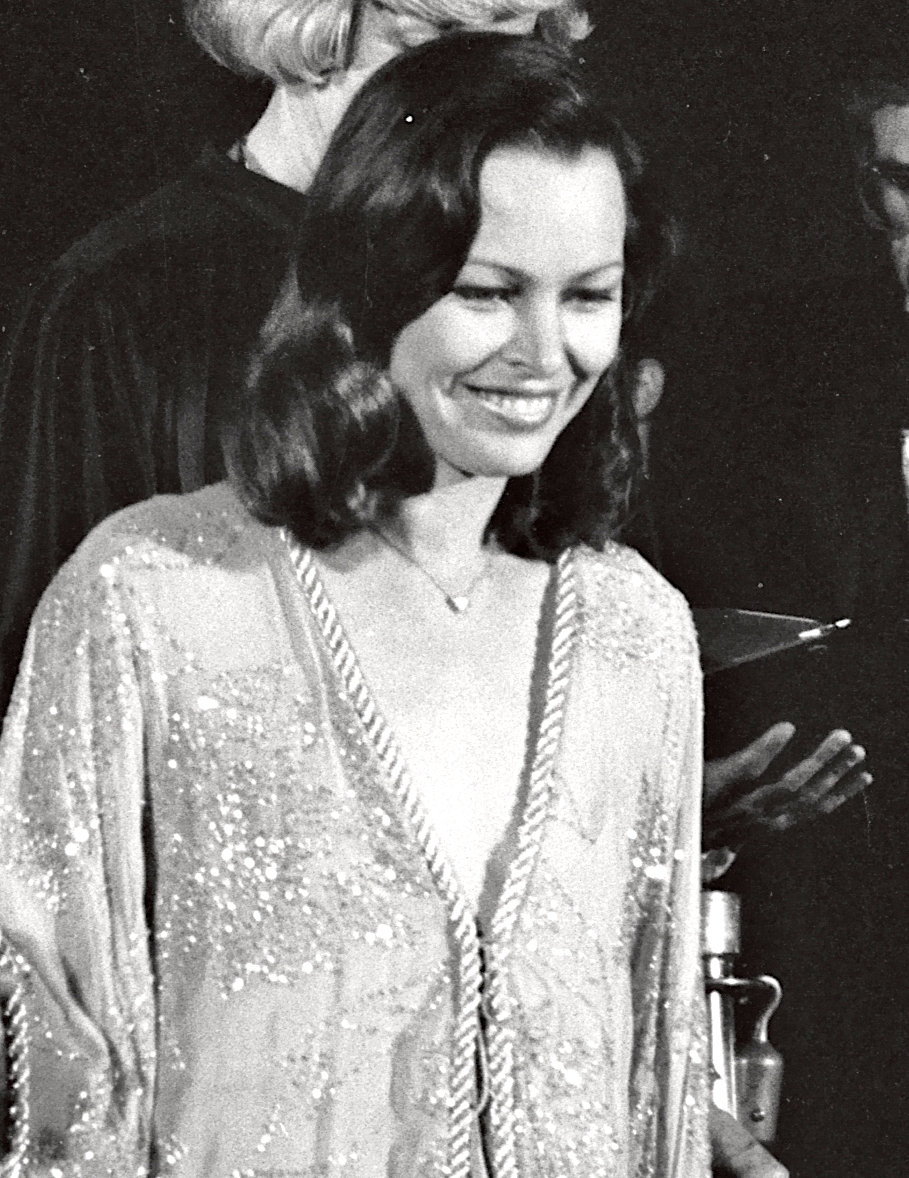
Phillips in 1979

Phillips' other film credits during this period include roles in the comedy The Man with Bogart's Face (1980), the nature horror film Savage Harvest (1981), about a family being attacked by a pride of lions, and American Anthem (1986). On television, Phillips played the mermaid princess Nyah in three episodes of Fantasy Island and Leora Van Treas in Mike Hammer: Murder Takes All (1983), starring Stacy Keach in the title role. She appeared in TV miniseries such as Aspen (1977) and The French Atlantic Affair (1979).

During this time, Phillips began dating actor Grainger Hines; she gave birth to their son, Austin Deveraux Hines, on March 3, 1982. The following year, she joined the cast of Hotel as the concierge, the daughter of hotel owner Victoria Cabot's rival, who plants his daughter as a spy to further his aim of acquiring control of the St. Gregory. Phillips continued to appear in the series until 1986. She also had a leading role in the television horror film The Covenant (1985) opposite Judy Parfitt and José Ferrer. Her relationship with Hines ended in 1984.

In 1986, she wrote her autobiography, California Dreamin': The True Story of the Mamas and the Papas, released just weeks after her former husband's autobiography, Papa John. In it, she describes events such as her first meeting with Cass Elliot; winning 17 straight shoots at a craps table in San Juan, Puerto Rico when the band was broke and could not afford the airfare back to the United States mainland; and how her writing credit on "California Dreamin'", which still nets her royalties, was "the best wake-up call" she ever had (she was asleep in a New York hotel room when husband John Phillips woke her to help him finish the new song that he was writing).

=== 1987–1993: Knots Landing and film ===
Beginning in 1987, Phillips starred on Knots Landing as the constantly scheming Anne Matheson Sumner, the mother of star Nicollette Sheridan's character Paige Matheson. She became a series regular in 1989 and continued to appear in the role until the series's 1993 conclusion.

On December 2, 1987, Phillips was arrested for marijuana possesssion in Amarillo, Texas after being pulled over for speeding. Phillips was a passenger in the car with boyfriend Geoffrey Tozer, and the marijuana was discovered after police searched the couple's vehicle. Phillips was booked and released on $500 bond. Also in late 1987, Phillips sang backup vocals on Belinda Carlisle's studio album Heaven on Earth, as well as its number-one single "Heaven Is a Place on Earth". The following year, she appeared in the Star Trek: The Next Generation first-season episode "We'll Always Have Paris" as Jenice Manheim, wife of the scientist Paul Manheim. Phillips and Tozer got engaged on February 29, 1988. The couple took in Aron Wilson, a friend of her son Austin's, whom they legally adopted and raised.

While starring on Knots Landing, Phillips continued to appear in films, including a supporting role in 1989's gambling-themed Let It Ride, co-starring with Richard Dreyfuss and Teri Garr, playing what Kevin Thomas of the Los Angeles Times characterized as a "deliciously blonde society tramp". She had a supporting role in the thriller Scissors (1991), opposite Sharon Stone, playing the politician wife of a therapist treating a mentally-unstable woman (Stone). Next, she had a supporting role as the wife of a former race-car driver in the action thriller Joshua Tree (1993), starring Dolph Lundgren.

Following the 1993 conclusion of Knots Landing, Phillips starred in the short-lived drama series Second Chances (1993–1994) opposite Connie Sellecca and Jennifer Lopez. She also had the lead role in the 1993 television thriller film Rubdown, playing a woman at the center of a divorce plot in which her husband pays a masseur to have an affair with her. Denise McIver of Variety panned the film, writing: "The most disturbing thing about this two-hour cable telefilm is its cynicism and the fact that none of the characters seemed redeemed, or at least changed, by their experiences. This is not to say it won't hold one's interest, if only for the scenario, which delivers lots of bare backs, naked legs and superficially steamy sex scenes." In late September 1993, Phillips and her friend Aloma Ichinose were robbed at gunpoint outside a restaurant in West Hollywood, California.

=== 1994–present: Television and film ===
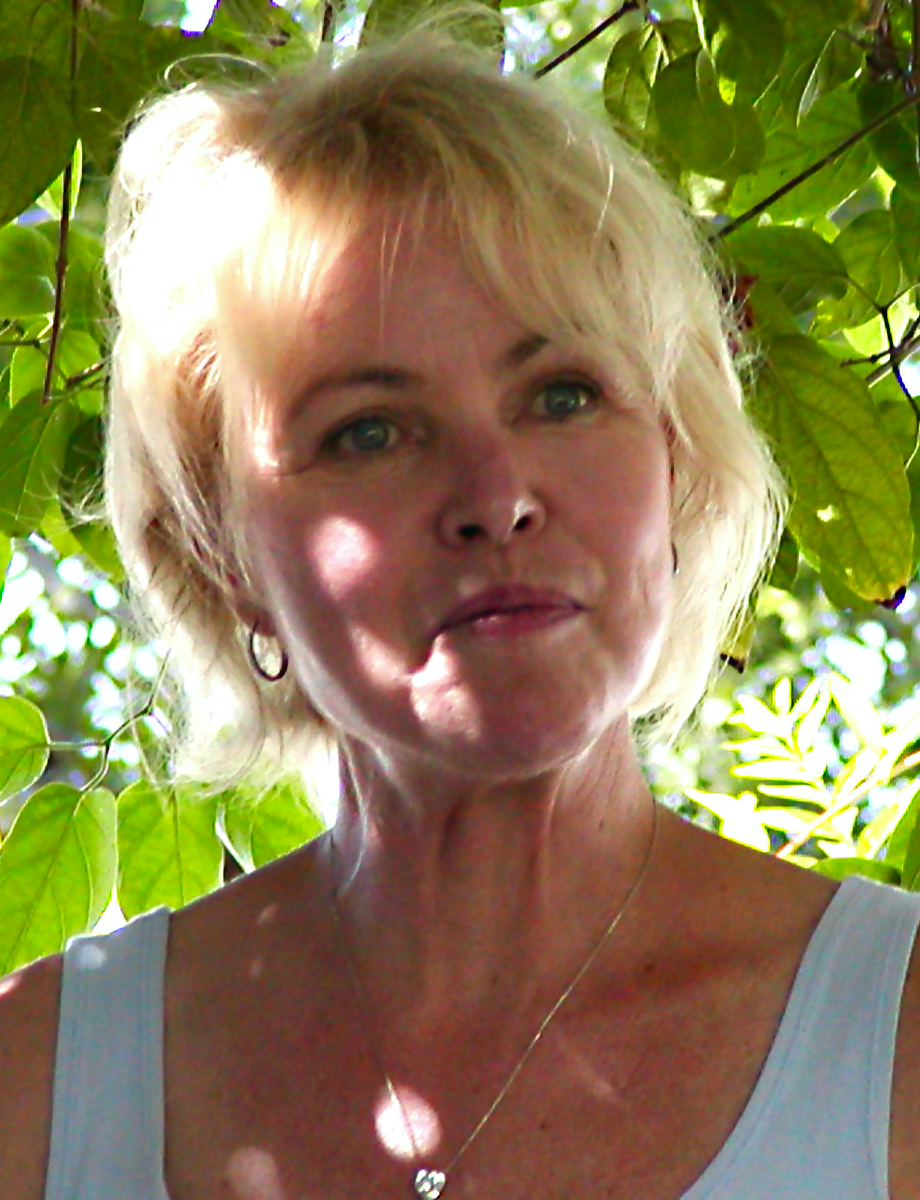
Phillips in 2002

Phillips played Laura Collins in the television drama film No One Would Tell (1996), and also supplied the voice of Raven, a television host, on Ralph Bakshi's HBO animated series Spicy City (1997). Beginning in 1997, she portrayed Abby Malone, mother of Valerie Malone (Tiffani Thiessen) on Fox's Beverly Hills, 90210, and in the same year reprised her role of Anne Matheson in the television film Knots Landing: Back to the Cul-de-Sac.

Having split with Tozer in 1996, Phillips began dating plastic surgeon Steven Zax in 1999. Zax was a divorced father of three sons from his marriage to Corinna Tsopei. From 1999 to 2000, Phillips had a guest role on the television series The Magnificent Seven, on which she played Maude Standish, the mother of one of the Seven. After the millennium, Phillips continued to occasionally appear in films. She had a supporting role in the comedy Jane White Is Sick & Twisted (2002), the controversial gay-themed drama Harry + Max (2004), and as a waitress in the independent comedy Unbeatable Harold (2006). Between 2001 and 2004, Phillips also appeared on television in a recurring role on The WB drama 7th Heaven as Lily Jackson, half-sister of family matriarch Annie Jackson Camden (Catherine Hicks).

In 2009, Phillips appeared at the annual TV Land Awards for the 30th-year celebration of Knots Landing. She also appeared in a minor role in the Norwegian historical film Betrayal, which chronicles the German occupation of Norway.

In 2017, Zax, Phillips' long-term partner of 18 years, died. In 2019, Phillips appeared as an interview subject in Andrew Slater's Echo in the Canyon, a documentary on the Laurel Canyon music scene of the 1960s.

== Artistry ==
Phillips has been noted for her soprano vocals, and was once deemed by Time as "the purest soprano" in pop music. A 1977 Billboard review described Phillips' vocals as "both spirited and smooth". Despite having received critical acclaim for her singing, Phillips has admitted to being self-conscious about her voice, and stated that Cass Elliot encouraged her during their tenure in the Mamas & the Papas. She recalled in 2004: "I've yet to meet another woman as strong, funny and fiercely independent as Cass was. She was very generous vocally, too. John would give us these impossibly high parts to sing because he loved the sound of girls in the clouds. Cass would tell me, 'Just go for it, Mich! You know I'm gonna make it—come and join me!'"

== Views ==
During a 1991 interview with Arsenio Hall, Phillips advocated providing teenagers with a pragmatic education on drugs, specifically to distinguish psychedelics and marijuana from more addictive substances such as cocaine and heroin. Though she admitted to having used LSD and marijuana in her youth, Phillips maintained that she never had experimented with other drugs, crediting the education her father instilled in her and her sister on drugs and addiction. She also spoke of her belief that parents should provide their children with condoms and other contraceptives once they are aware their children are sexually active. Phillips said that she raised her children this way: "At that time, it wasn't even a question of AIDS. It was a pregnancy issue, and venereal disease ... I raised [my children] in the same way that I was raised myself: When I was a young girl, my father said, 'When you become sexually active, let me know, so that we can arrange for you not to get pregnant.' I was raised in a very pragmatic household, and I believe that if you know your children are sexually active, then you have to try to protect them."

In 2008, Phillips advocated legalization of marijuana, crediting it with helping her quit smoking cigarettes: "When I really, really, really wanted a cigarette, I would take a puff of pot, and the cravings would go away."

== Discography ==
The Mamas & the Papas

Solo

- Victim of Romance (1977)

Solo singles

Single	Year	Ref.
"Aloha Louie"	1975	
"No Love Today"	1976	
"Aching Kind"	1977	
"There She Goes"	1978	

== Sources ==
- Biskind, Peter (1998). Easy Riders Raging Bulls: How the Sex-Drugs-and Rock 'n Roll Generation Saved Hollywood. New York: Simon & Schuster. ISBN 978-0-68485-708-4.
- Collins, Max Alan; Traylor, James L. (2018). Mickey Spillane on Screen: A Complete Study of the Television and Film Adaptations. Jefferson, North Carolina: McFarland. ISBN 978-0-786-49242-8.
- Rees, Dayfdd; Crampton, Luke (1999). Rock Stars Encyclopedia (2nd ed.). New York: D.K. Pub. ISBN 978-0-789-44613-8.
- Greenwald, Matthew (2002). Go Where You Wanna Go: The Oral History of the Mamas & the Papas. Cooper Square Press. ISBN 978-0-815-41204-5.
- International Television & Video Almanac. Vol. 49. New York: Quigley Publishing Company. 2004. ISSN 0895-2213.
- Julius, Marshall (1996). Action!: The Action Movie A–Z. Bloomington, Indiana: Indiana University Press. ISBN 978-0-253-21091-3.
- Larkin, Colin (2006). The Encyclopedia of Popular Music. Vol. 10. Oxford: Oxford University Press. ISBN 978-0-195-31373-4.
- Marill, Alvin H. (1980). Movies Made for Television: The Telefeature and the Mini-series, 1964–1979. New York: Da Capo Press. ISBN 978-0-306-80156-3.
- Marill, Alvin H. (1987). Movies Made for Television: The Telefeature and the Mini-series, 1964–1986 (4th ed.). New York: New York Zoetrope. ISBN 978-0-918-43280-3.
- Phillips, John (1986). Papa John: An Autobiography (of the Mamas and the Papas): A Music Legend's Shattering Journey Through Sex, Drugs, and Rock 'n' Roll. Garden City, New York: Doubleday. ISBN 978-0-38523-120-6.
- Phillips, Michelle (1986). California Dreamin'. New York: Warner Books. ISBN 978-0-44651-308-1.
- Riggs, Thomas, ed. (2001). Contemporary Theatre, Film, and Television. Detroit, Michigan: Gale Research Co. ISBN 978-0-787-65109-1.
- Strodder, Chris (2000). Swingin' Chicks of the '60s: A Tribute to 101 of the Decade's Defining Women. San Rafael, California: Cedco Pub. ISBN 978-0-768-32232-3.
- Wenning, Elizabeth (1991). Contemporary Musicians. Vol. 5. Detroit, Michigan: Gale. ISBN 978-1-414-49777-8.
