= Roxy: Tonight's the Night Live =

Live album by Neil Young
- Released: April 24, 2018
- Recorded: September 20 – 22, 1973
- Venue: Roxy Theatre, Sunset Strip, Los Angeles
- Genre: Blues rock; country rock
- Length: 53:15
- Label: Reprise
- Producer: David Briggs; Neil Young

Neil Young chronology
Paradox (2018)	Roxy: Tonight's the Night Live (2018)	Songs for Judy (2018)

Archives Performance Series chronology
PS04: Tuscaloosa (2019)	PS05: Roxy: Tonight's the Night Live (2018)	PS07: Songs for Judy (2018)

Professional ratings
Review scores
Source	Rating
Pitchfork	8.3/10
Rolling Stone	4/5 stars

Roxy: Tonight's the Night Live is a live album by Canadian-American musician Neil Young. The album is culled from live recordings made at the Roxy Theatre on the Sunset Strip in Los Angeles, shows that celebrated the club's opening as part of Neil Young Tonight's the Night Tour 1973. Neil Young and the backing band he called the Santa Monica Flyers played two sets a night on September 20, 21, and 22, 1973, shortly after the band had finished recording Tonight's the Night. Because of that, almost the entire concert is made up of that album.

The album was also included in the Archives Volume II boxset released in 2020, featuring an additional track "The Losing End" not present on the original version.

== Track listing ==
All songs written by Neil Young, except where noted.

No.	Title	Writer(s)	Length
1.	"Intro"		0:51
2.	"Tonight's the Night"		6:48
3.	"Roll Out the Barrel"	Jaromír Vejvoda	0:52
4.	"Mellow My Mind"		3:11
5.	"World on a String"		2:43
6.	"Band Intro"		1:23
7.	"Speakin' Out"		6:37
8.	"Candy Bar Rap"		0:31
9.	"Albuquerque"		3:51
10.	"Perry Como Rap"		0:17
11.	"New Mama"		2:39
12.	"David Geffen Rap"		0:35
13.	"Roll Another Number (For the Road)"		4:40
14.	"Candy Bar 2 Rap"		0:28
15.	"Tired Eyes"		7:02
16.	"Tonight's the Night – Part II"		6:38
17.	"Walk On"		3:38
18.	"Outro"		0:31
19.	"The Losing End (Bonus track only on Archives Volume II)"		6:51

== Personnel ==
- Neil Young – vocals, guitar, piano, harmonica
- Ben Keith – pedal steel guitar, slide guitar, vocals
- Nils Lofgren – piano, guitar, vocals
- Billy Talbot – bass
- Ralph Molina – drums, vocals

Engineering and production

- David Briggs, Neil Young – production
- Gene Eichelberger, Denny Purcell – recording engineers
- Tim Mulligan – front of house, monitor
- John Talbot, Carl Countryman – equipment
- John Nowland – mixing (Redwood Digital)
- Jeff Pinn – assistant engineer
- Chris Bellman – mastering (Bernie Grundman Mastering)
- John Hanlon – post-production, mastering

== Charts ==
Chart (2018)	Peak position
Australian Albums (ARIA)	97
Austrian Albums (Ö3 Austria)	25
Belgian Albums (Ultratop Flanders)	27
Belgian Albums (Ultratop Wallonia)	79
Croatian International Albums (HDU)	7
Dutch Albums (Album Top 100)	41
French Albums (SNEP)	141
German Albums (Offizielle Top 100)	20
Hungarian Albums (MAHASZ)	39
Irish Albums (IRMA)	63
Italian Albums (FIMI)	69
New Zealand Heatseeker Albums (RMNZ)	3
Norwegian Albums (VG-lista)	23
Scottish Albums (OCC)	10
Spanish Albums (PROMUSICAE)	36
Swedish Albums (Sverigetopplistan)	53
Swiss Albums (Schweizer Hitparade)	61
UK Albums (OCC)	30
US Billboard 200	70
US Top Rock Albums (Billboard)	9
US Folk Albums (Billboard)	5
US Top Catalog Albums (Billboard)	6
US Vinyl Albums (Billboard)	2
US Indie Store Album Sales (Billboard)	3
