= Tired Eyes (disambiguation) =

"Tired Eyes" is a song by Neil Young from Tonight's the Night. It may also refer to:

- Eye strain
- "Tired Eyes", song by Chicken Shack from Accept
- "Tired Eyes", song by +/- from Xs on Your Eyes
