= Neil Young Archives Volume II: 1972–1976 =

Box set by Neil Young
- Released: November 20, 2020
- Recorded: 1972–1976
- Genres: Folk rock; rock
- Length: 515:47
- Label: Reprise
- Producers: Neil Young; Henry Lewy; Elliot Mazer; David Briggs; Tim Mulligan; Al Schmitt; Mark Harman; Ben Keith; Stephen Stills; Don Gehman

Neil Young chronology
Return to Greendale (2020)	Neil Young Archives Volume II: 1972–1976 (2020)	Way Down in the Rust Bucket (2021)

Singles from Neil Young Archives Volume II: 1972–1976
- 1. "Come Along and Say You Will" Released: October 14, 2020; 2. "Homefires" Released: October 21, 2020; 3. "Powderfinger" Released: November 3, 2020; 4. "The Losing End" Released: November 13, 2020; 5. "Goodbye Christians on the Shore" Released: December 18, 2020; 6. "Pocahontas" Released: January 22, 2021; 7. "Daughters" Released: February 5, 2021; 8. "Stringman" Released: February 24, 2021

Professional ratings
Review scores
Source	Rating
AllMusic	4.5/5 stars
American Songwriter	4.5/5 stars
Classic Rock	4.5/5 stars
Mojo	4/5 stars
Riff Magazine	8/10
Rolling Stone	4.5/5 stars
Uncut	9/10
The Guardian	4/5 stars

Neil Young Archives Volume II: 1972–1976 is a 10-CD box set from American-Canadian folk rock musician Neil Young that was initially released in a limited deluxe box set (and streaming on the Neil Young Archives site) on November 20, 2020. The release is the second box set in his Neil Young Archives series, following 2009's The Archives Vol. 1 1963–1972, and covers a three-and-a-half-year period from 1972 to 1976. The track list was officially announced on the Neil Young Archives site on September 20, 2020, with the first single, "Come Along and Say You Will", being posted to the site as the Song of the Day on October 14. The set then went up for pre-order on October 16, 2020, as an exclusive release to his online store, with only 3,000 copies being initially made available worldwide. After selling out the following day, Young announced several weeks later that a general retail version, as well as a second pressing of the deluxe box set, is expected to be released to market on March 5, 2021. This was followed by the release of a second single, "Homefires", on October 21, and a third, an alternate version of "Powderfinger", on November 3.

Of the 131 tracks on the track listing, 63 are previously unreleased. These include live and alternate versions of previously released songs. Twelve of the songs on this set have never been released in any form.

== Background ==
Young's manager Elliot Roberts originally said in 2009 that Volume II would span the period of 1972 through 1982, and would be released "two or three years" after Volume I. In October 2009, Young told Guitar World that a disc called Time Fades Away II would be included in the second volume, noting: "It's interesting because [Time Fades Away II] has a different drummer than what was on that album. Kenny Buttrey was in there for the first half, and Johnny Barbata came in for the second. It's a completely different thing, with completely different songs" Time Fades Away II would eventually evolve into the Performance Series release Tuscaloosa though that album only contains two songs from the album Time Fades Away. Young had also said in 2012 that "four unreleased albums from this period are being rebuilt ... Chrome Dreams, Homegrown, and Oceanside-Countryside are the three unreleased studio albums. Also from this period is the unreleased Odeon Budokan live recording produced by David Briggs and Tim Mulligan".

In May 2014, Young stated that Volume II would be finished by the summer, and that the remaining volumes would be issued relatively quickly following the second. In July 2016, Rolling Stone and the Thrasher's Wheat website reported that Young intended to focus on completing Archives Volume II after his tour with Promise of the Real concluded that October. Although a physical release was still planned, it would also involve a "high-resolution website" and would also include unreleased works entitled Dume and Hitchhiker (Hitchhiker was later released as a standalone album on September 8, 2017, with Dume later confirmed to be a disc on Volume II. The Neil Young Archives website was also launched in December of that year.). In August 2018, in response to an enquiring fan in the Letters to the Editor section of the NYA Times-Contrarian area of his website, Young had the following to say: "May 2019 the NYA V2 CDs and a separate book by Toshi Onuki will be available. Blu Ray is no longer viable for economic reasons. NYA can give you what the blu ray had though, including Hi Res audio. Thanks NY."

In September 2018, March and April 2019, in response to other fans enquiring on its release in the Letters to the Editor section of the NYA, Neil Young stated: "We are currently reviewing all of the unreleased albums from the Volume II period, which is the seventies. Songs for Judy was one of those. Oceanside Countryside is another. We are reviewing the others"; "NYA vol 2 late this year/before Christmas. Odeon Budokon is on volume 2 as an album"; "Volume two has so much content that we have made it into two sets. The first is about ten discs and will include Odeon Budokan. The set covers about 4 or 5 years of intense recording and creativity."

In March 2020, Young confirmed Volume II for release on July 24 of that year. After numerous delays related to the coronavirus pandemic, it was scheduled to be released on November 20, according to the Archives website. A track listing posted to the Archives site on September 20 confirmed Volume II’s contents, and the first single, "Come Along and Say You Will", was posted to the site as the Song of the Day on October 14. The set then went up for pre-order on the 16th as an exclusive release to his online store, with only 3,000 copies being initially made available worldwide. After selling out the following day, Neil and Warner Records announced a second run of the deluxe edition, as well as a general retail version, several weeks later, both of which are scheduled to hit the market on March 5, 2021. This was followed by the release of a second single, "Homefires", on October 21, and a third, an alternate version of "Powderfinger", on November 3.

== Track listing ==
=== Disc 1 – Everybody's Alone (1972–1973) ===
1. "Letter from 'Nam" (3:35) – previously unreleased song (early version of "Long Walk Home")
  - Neil Young – guitar, harmonica, vocal
  - Recorded at A&M Studios, Los Angeles, 11/15/1972. Produced by Neil Young and Henry Lewy.
2. "Monday Morning" (2:47) – previously unreleased version of "Last Dance"
  - Neil Young – guitar, vocal
  - Recorded at A&M Recording Studios, Los Angeles, 11/15/1972. Produced by Neil Young and Henry Lewy.
3. "The Bridge" (2:56) – previously unreleased version
  - Neil Young – piano, harmonica, vocal
  - Recorded at A&M Recording Studios, Los Angeles, 11/15/1972. Produced by Neil Young and Henry Lewy.
4. "Time Fades Away" (4:21) – Neil Young with The Stray Gators – previously unreleased version
  - Neil Young – guitar, vocal; Ben Keith – lap slide guitar, vocal; Tim Drummond – bass; Jack Nitzsche – piano; Kenny Buttrey – drums
  - Recorded at Studio, Broken Arrow Ranch, 12/15/1972. Produced by Elliot Mazer and Neil Young
5. "Come Along and Say You Will" (2:28) – Neil Young with The Stray Gators – previously unreleased song
  - Neil Young – guitar, vocal; Ben Keith – pedal steel guitar, vocal; Tim Drummond – bass; Jack Nitzsche – piano; Kenny Buttrey – drums
  - Recorded at Studio, Broken Arrow Ranch, 12/15/1972. Produced by Elliot Mazer & Neil Young.
6. "Goodbye Christians on the Shore" (5:24) – Neil Young with The Stray Gators – previously unreleased song
  - Neil Young – guitar, harmonica, vocal; Ben Keith – dobro, vocal; Tim Drummond – bass; Jack Nitzsche – piano; Kenny Buttrey – drums
  - Recorded at Studio, Broken Arrow Ranch, 12/15/1972. Produced by Elliot Mazer & Neil Young.
7. "Last Trip to Tulsa" (4:19) – Neil Young with The Stray Gators – from the 45 RPM single of "Time Fades Away"
  - Neil Young – guitar, vocal; Ben Keith – lap slide guitar; Tim Drummond – bass; Jack Nitzsche – piano; Johnny Barbata – drums
  - Recorded at Louisiana State University Assembly Center, Baton Rouge, LA, 2/18/1973. Produced by Neil Young & Elliot Mazer.
8. "The Loner" (3:54) – Neil Young with The Stray Gators – previously unreleased version
  - Neil Young – guitar, vocal; Ben Keith – lap slide guitar; Tim Drummond – bass; Jack Nitzsche – piano; Johnny Barbata – drums
  - Recorded at Myriad Convention Center, Oklahoma City, OK, 3/1/1973. Produced by Elliot Mazer & Neil Young.
9. "Sweet Joni" (2:42) – previously unreleased song
  - Neil Young – piano, harmonica, vocal
  - Recorded at Bakersfield Civic Auditorium, Bakersfield, CA, 3/11/1973. Produced by Elliot Mazer and Neil Young.
10. "Yonder Stands the Sinner" (3:19) – Neil Young with The Stray Gators – from the album Time Fades Away
  - Neil Young – guitar, vocal; David Crosby – guitar, vocal; Ben Keith – slide guitar; Tim Drummond – bass; Jack Nitzsche – piano; Johnny Barbata – drums
  - Recorded at Seattle Center, Seattle, WA, 3/17/1973. Produced by Neil Young & Elliot Mazer.
11. "L.A." (Story) (4:02) – previously unreleased
  - Neil Young – guitar, vocal
  - Recorded at Memorial Auditorium, Sacramento, CA, 4/1/1973. Produced by Elliot Mazer and Neil Young.
12. "L.A." (3:35) – previously unreleased version
  - Neil Young – guitar, harmonica, vocal
  - Recorded at Memorial Auditorium, Sacramento, CA, 4/1/1973. Produced by Elliot Mazer and Neil Young.
13. "Human Highway" (3:04) – Crosby, Stills, Nash & Young – previously unreleased version from aborted Human Highway sessions.
  - Neil Young – guitar, vocal; Stephen Stills – guitar, vocal; David Crosby – vocal; Graham Nash – vocal
  - Recorded at Studio, Broken Arrow Ranch, 6/29/1973. Produced by Elliot Mazer and CSNY.

=== Disc 2 – Tuscaloosa (1973) ===
1. "Here We Are in the Years" (3:56)
2. "After the Gold Rush" (4:42)
3. "Out on the Weekend" (5:29)
4. "Harvest" (4:14)
5. "Old Man" (4:17)
6. "Heart of Gold" (3:48)
7. "Time Fades Away" (6:10)
8. "Lookout Joe" (4:59)
9. "New Mama" (3:01)
10. "Alabama" (3:50)
11. "Don't Be Denied" (8:09)
  - Neil Young – guitar, vocal, piano, harmonica; Ben Keith – pedal steel guitar, slide guitar, vocal; Jack Nitzsche – piano, vocal; Tim Drummond – bass; Kenny Buttrey – drums, vocal (all tracks)
  - Recorded at Memorial Auditorium, Tuscaloosa, AL, 2/5/1973. Produced by Neil Young & Elliot Mazer.

=== Disc 3 – Tonight's the Night (1973) ===
1. "Speakin' Out Jam" (5:01) – Neil Young and Santa Monica Flyers – previously unreleased version from Tonight’s the Night sessions
  - Neil Young – piano, vocal; Nils Lofgren – guitar; Ben Keith – pedal steel guitar; Billy Talbot – bass; Ralph Molina – drums
  - Recorded at S.I.R., Hollywood, 8/25/1973. Produced by David Briggs & Neil Young with Tim Mulligan.
2. "Everybody's Alone" (2:44) – Neil Young and Santa Monica Flyers – previously unreleased song from Tonight's the Night sessions
  - Neil Young – guitar, vocal; Nils Lofgren – piano, vocal; Ben Keith – pedal steel guitar, vocal; Billy Talbot – bass; Ralph Molina – drums, vocal
  - Recorded at S.I.R., Hollywood, 8/26/1973. Produced by David Briggs & Neil Young with Tim Mulligan.
3. "Tired Eyes" (4:41) – Neil Young and Santa Monica Flyers – from the album Tonight's the Night
  - Neil Young – guitar, harmonica, vocal; Nils Lofgren – piano, vocal; Ben Keith – pedal steel guitar, vocal; Billy Talbot – bass, vocal; Ralph Molina – drums, vocal
  - Recorded at S.I.R., Hollywood, 8/26/1973. Produced by David Briggs & Neil Young with Tim Mulligan.
4. "Tonight's the Night" (4:43) – Neil Young and Santa Monica Flyers – from the album Tonight's the Night
  - Neil Young – piano, vocal; Nils Lofgren – guitar; Ben Keith – pedal steel guitar, vocal; Billy Talbot – bass; Ralph Molina – drums, vocal
  - Recorded at S.I.R., Hollywood, 8/26/1973. Produced by David Briggs & Neil Young with Tim Mulligan.
5. "Mellow My Mind" (3:11) – Neil Young and Santa Monica Flyers – from the album Tonight's the Night
  - Neil Young – guitar, harmonica, vocal; Nils Lofgren – piano; Ben Keith – pedal steel guitar; Billy Talbot – bass; Ralph Molina – drums
  - Recorded at S.I.R., Hollywood, 8/26/1973. Produced by David Briggs & Neil Young with Tim Mulligan.
6. "World on a String" (2:27) – Neil Young and Santa Monica Flyers – from the album Tonight's the Night
  - Neil Young – guitar, harmonica, vocal; Nils Lofgren – piano; Ben Keith – pedal steel guitar; Billy Talbot – bass; Ralph Molina – drums, vocal
  - Recorded at S.I.R., Hollywood, 8/26/1973. Produced by David Briggs & Neil Young with Tim Mulligan.
7. "Speakin' Out" (4:57) – Neil Young and Santa Monica Flyers – from the album Tonight's the Night
  - Neil Young – piano, vocal; Nils Lofgren – guitar; Ben Keith – pedal steel guitar, vocal; Billy Talbot – bass; Ralph Molina – drums
  - Recorded at S.I.R., Hollywood, 8/26/1973. Produced by David Briggs & Neil Young with Tim Mulligan.
8. "Raised on Robbery" (3:37) – Neil Young and Santa Monica Flyers – previously unreleased Joni Mitchell song from Tonight's the Night sessions
  - Joni Mitchell – guitar, vocal; Neil Young – guitar, vocal; Nils Lofgren – piano; Ben Keith – lap slide guitar; Billy Talbot – bass; Ralph Molina – drums
  - Recorded at S.I.R., Hollywood, 8/26/1973. Produced by David Briggs, Neil Young and Joni Mitchell.
9. "Roll Another Number (for the Road)" (3:05) – Neil Young and Santa Monica Flyers – from the album Tonight's the Night
  - Neil Young – guitar, vocal; Nils Lofgren – piano, vocal; Ben Keith – pedal steel guitar, vocal; Billy Talbot – bass; Ralph Molina – drums, vocal
  - Recorded at S.I.R., Hollywood, 9/9/1973. Produced by David Briggs & Neil Young with Tim Mulligan.
10. "New Mama" (2:10) – Neil Young and Santa Monica Flyers – from the album Tonight's the Night
  - Neil Young – guitar, vocal, vibes; Nils Lofgren - piano; Ben Keith – vocal; Ralph Molina – vocal; George Whitsell – vocal
  - Recorded at S.I.R., Hollywood, 9/10/1973. Produced by David Briggs & Neil Young with Tim Mulligan.
11. "Albuquerque" (4:02) – Neil Young and Santa Monica Flyers – from the album Tonight's the Night
  - Neil Young – guitar, vocal; Nils Lofgren – piano, vocal; Ben Keith – pedal steel guitar, vocal; Billy Talbot – bass; Ralph Molina – drums, vocal
  - Recorded at S.I.R., Hollywood, 9/13/1973. Produced by David Briggs & Neil Young with Tim Mulligan.
12. "Tonight's the Night Part II" (5:18) – Neil Young and Santa Monica Flyers – from the album Tonight's the Night, features previously unreleased extended intro
  - Neil Young – piano, vocal; Nils Lofgren – guitar; Ben Keith – pedal steel guitar, vocal; Billy Talbot – bass; Ralph Molina – drums, vocal
  - Recorded at S.I.R., Hollywood, 9/13/1973. Produced by David Briggs & Neil Young with Tim Mulligan.

=== Disc 4 – Roxy: Tonight's the Night Live (1973) ===
1. "Tonight's the Night" (6:48)
2. "Mellow My Mind” (3:11)
3. “Roll Out the Barrel” (0:52)
4. "World on a String" (2:43)
5. "Speakin' Out" (6:37)
6. "Albuquerque" (3:51)
7. "New Mama" (2:39)
8. "Roll Another Number" (4:40)
9. "Tired Eyes" (7:02)
10. "Tonight's the Night Part II" (6:38)
11. "Walk On" (3:38)
12. "The Losing End" (6:20) – previously unreleased live version
  - Neil Young – guitar, vocal, piano, harmonica; Ben Keith – pedal steel guitar, slide guitar, vocal; Nils Lofgren – piano, guitar, vocal; Billy Talbot – bass; Ralph Molina – drums, vocal (all tracks)
  - Recorded at The Roxy, West Hollywood, CA, 9/20-9/22/1973. Produced by David Briggs & Neil Young.

=== Disc 5 – Walk On (1973–1974) ===
1. "Winterlong" (3:08) – from the album Decade
  - Neil Young – guitar, vocal; Ben Keith – pedal steel guitar, vocal; Billy Talbot – bass; Ralph Molina – drums, vocal
  - Recorded at Studio, Broken Arrow Ranch, 11/28/1973. Produced by David Briggs & Neil Young.
2. "Walk On" (2:42) – from the album On the Beach
  - Neil Young – guitar, vocal; Ben Keith – slide guitar, vocal; Billy Talbot – bass; Ralph Molina – drums, vocal
  - Recorded at Studio, Broken Arrow Ranch, 11/30/1973. Produced by David Briggs & Neil Young.
3. "Bad Fog of Loneliness" (2:16) – previously unreleased version from On the Beach sessions
  - Neil Young – guitar, vocal; Ben Keith – pedal steel guitar, vocal; Billy Talbot – bass; Ralph Molina – drums, vocal
  - Recorded at Studio, Broken Arrow Ranch, 12/1/1973. Produced by David Briggs & Neil Young.
4. "Borrowed Tune" (3:25) – from the album Tonight’s the Night
  - Neil Young – piano, harmonica, vocal.
  - Recorded at Studio, Broken Arrow Ranch, 12/5/1973. Produced by Neil Young & Tim Mulligan.
5. "Traces" (2:11) – previously unreleased version from On the Beach sessions
  - Neil Young – guitar, harmonica, vocal.
  - Recorded at Studio, Broken Arrow Ranch, 12/5/1973. Produced by Neil Young & Tim Mulligan.
6. "For the Turnstiles" (3:16) – from the album On the Beach
  - Neil Young – banjo guitar, vocal; Ben Keith – dobro, vocal
  - Recorded at Studio, Broken Arrow Ranch, 12/14/1973. Produced by Neil Young & Tim Mulligan.
7. "Ambulance Blues" (8:59) – from the album On the Beach
  - Neil Young – guitar, vocal, harmonica, electric tambourine; Ben Keith – bass; Rusty Kershaw – fiddle; Ralph Molina – hand drums
  - Recorded at Sunset Sound, Hollywood, 3/25/1974. Produced by Neil Young & Al Schmitt.
8. "Motion Pictures" (4:24) – from the album On the Beach
  - Neil Young – guitar, vocal, harmonica; Ben Keith – bass; Rusty Kershaw – slide guitar; Ralph Molina – hand drums
  - Recorded at Sunset Sound, Hollywood, 3/26/1974. Produced by Neil Young & Al Schmitt.
9. "On the Beach" (7:03) – from the album On the Beach
  - Neil Young – guitar, vocal; Ben Keith – hand drums; Graham Nash – Wurlitzer electric piano; Tim Drummond – bass; Ralph Molina – drums
  - Recorded at Sunset Sound, Hollywood, CA, 3/28/1974. Produced by Neil Young & Al Schmitt.
10. "Revolution Blues" (4:04) – from the album On the Beach
  - Neil Young – guitar, vocal; Ben Keith – Wurlitzer electric piano; David Crosby – guitar; Rick Danko – bass; Levon Helm – drums
  - Recorded at Sunset Sound, Hollywood, CA, 4/6/1974. Produced by Neil Young & Mark Harman.
11. "Vampire Blues" (4:11) – from the album On the Beach
  - Neil Young – guitar, vocal; Ben Keith – organ, vocal, hair drum; George Whitsell – guitar; Tim Drummond – bass, percussion; Ralph Molina – drums
  - Recorded at Sunset Sound, Hollywood, CA, 4/7/1974. Produced by Neil Young & Mark Harman.
12. "Greensleeves" (1:59) – previously unreleased song
  - Neil Young – guitar, vocal
  - Recorded at Studio, Broken Arrow Ranch, 5/8/1974. Produced by Neil Young

=== Disc 6 – The Old Homestead (1974) ===
1. "Love/Art Blues" (2:24) – previously unreleased version
  - Neil Young – guitar, harmonica, vocal
  - Recorded at Studio, Broken Arrow Ranch, 6/15/1974. Produced by Neil Young & Tim Mulligan.
2. "Through My Sails" (3:28) – previously unreleased version
  - Neil Young – guitar, vocal
  - Recorded at Studio, Broken Arrow Ranch, 6/15/1974. Produced by Neil Young & Tim Mulligan.
3. "Homefires" (2:31) – previously unreleased song
  - Neil Young – guitar, vocal, harmonica; Tim Drummond – bass
  - Recorded at Studio, Broken Arrow Ranch, 6/16/1974. Produced by Neil Young & Tim Mulligan.
4. "Pardon My Heart" (3:48) – previously unreleased version
  - Neil Young – guitar, vocal; Tim Drummond – bass
  - Recorded at Studio, Broken Arrow Ranch, 6/16/1974. Produced by Neil Young & Tim Mulligan.
5. "Hawaiian Sunrise" (2:45) – previously unreleased version
  - Neil Young – guitar, vocal; Tim Drummond – bass
  - Recorded at Studio, Broken Arrow Ranch, 6/16/1974. Produced by Neil Young & Tim Mulligan.
6. "LA Girls and Ocean Boys" (2:25) – previously unreleased song
  - Neil Young – piano, vocal
  - Recorded at Studio, Broken Arrow Ranch, 6/16/1974. Produced by Neil Young & Tim Mulligan.
7. "Pushed It Over the End" (7:44) – Crosby, Stills, Nash & Young – previously unreleased version
  - Neil Young – guitar, vocal; Stephen Stills - Wurlitzer, clavinet; David Crosby - guitar; Graham Nash - piano, vocals; Tim Drummond - bass; Russ Kunkel - drums
  - Recorded at Chicago Stadium, 8/27/1974. Produced by Elliot Mazer and Crosby, Stills, Nash & Young.
8. "On the Beach" (7:32) – Crosby, Stills, Nash & Young – previously unreleased mix
  - Neil Young – guitar, vocal; Stephen Stills - guitar; David Crosby - guitar; Graham Nash - Wurlitzer, vocals; Tim Drummond - bass; Russ Kunkel - drums; Joe Lala - percussion
  - Recorded at Chicago Stadium, 8/28/1974. Produced by Elliot Mazer and Crosby, Stills, Nash & Young.
9. "Vacancy" (3:35) – previously unreleased version
  - Neil Young – guitar, vocal
  - Recorded at Studio, Broken Arrow Ranch, 11/4/1974. Produced by Neil Young & Tim Mulligan.
10. "One More Sign" (3:01) – previously unreleased version
  - Neil Young – piano, vocal
  - Recorded at Studio, Broken Arrow Ranch, 11/4/1974. Produced by Neil Young & Tim Mulligan.
11. "Frozen Man" (2:59) – previously unreleased song
  - Neil Young – guitar, vocal
  - Recorded at Studio, Broken Arrow Ranch, 11/4/1974. Produced by Neil Young & Tim Mulligan.
12. "Give Me Strength" (3:02) – previously unreleased version
  - Neil Young – guitar, piano, harmonica, vocal; Ellen Talbot - harmony vocal
  - Recorded at Studio, Broken Arrow Ranch, 11/4/1974. Produced by Neil Young & Tim Mulligan.
13. "Bad News Comes to Town" (2:55) – previously unreleased version
  - Neil Young – guitar, vocal
  - Recorded at Studio, Broken Arrow Ranch, 11/4/1974. Produced by Neil Young & Tim Mulligan.
14. "Changing Highways" (2:00) – Neil Young and Crazy Horse – previously unreleased version
  - Neil Young – guitar, vocal; Ben Keith - pedal steel guitar; Frank “Poncho” Sampedro – guitar; Billy Talbot – bass; Ralph Molina – drums
  - Recorded at Chess Studios, Chicago, 12/4/1974. Produced by Neil Young & Elliot Mazer.
15. "Love/Art Blues" (2:25) – previously unreleased version from Homegrown sessions
  - Neil Young – guitar, harmonica, vocal; Ben Keith - dobro, vocal; Tim Drummond - bass
  - Recorded at Quadrafonic Sound Studios, Nashville, 12/10/1974. Produced by Neil Young & Elliot Mazer.
16. "The Old Homestead" (7:40) – from the album Hawks & Doves
  - Neil Young – guitar, vocal; Tim Drummond – bass; Levon Helm – drums; Tom Scribner – saw
  - Recorded at Quadrafonic Sound Studios, Nashville, 12/11/1974. Produced by Neil Young & Elliot Mazer.
17. "Daughters" (3:30) – previously unreleased song from Homegrown sessions
  - Neil Young – guitar, vocal; Ben Keith - pedal steel guitar, vocal; Tim Drummond – bass; Levon Helm – drums; Nicolette Larson - vocal
  - Recorded at Quadrafonic Sound Studios, Nashville, 12/11/1974. Produced by Neil Young & Elliot Mazer.
18. "Deep Forbidden Lake" (3:41) – from the album Decade
  - Neil Young – guitar, vocal; Ben Keith – pedal steel guitar; Tim Drummond – bass; Karl T. Himmel – drums
  - Recorded at Quadrafonic Sound Studios, Nashville, 12/13/1974. Produced by Neil Young & Elliot Mazer.
19. "Love/Art Blues" (2:40) – previously unreleased version from Homegrown sessions
  - Neil Young – guitar, harmonica, vocal; Ben Keith – pedal steel guitar; Tim Drummond – bass; Kenny Buttrey – drums; Stan Szelest - Wurlitzer
  - Recorded at Studio, Broken Arrow Ranch, 12/31/1974. Produced by Neil Young & Elliot Mazer.

=== Disc 7 – Homegrown (1974–1975) ===
1. "Separate Ways" (3:33)
  - Neil Young – guitar, vocal, harmonica; Ben Keith – pedal steel; Tim Drummond – bass; Levon Helm – drums
  - Recorded at Quadrafonic Sound Studios, Nashville, 12/11/1974. Produced by Neil Young & Elliot Mazer.
2. "Try" (2:47)
  - Neil Young – guitar, vocal; Ben Keith – pedal steel, vocal; Tim Drummond – bass; Levon Helm – drums; Emmylou Harris – vocal; Joe Yankee – piano
  - Recorded at Quadrafonic Sound Studios, Nashville, 12/11/1974. Produced by Neil Young & Elliot Mazer.
3. "Mexico" (1:40)
  - Neil Young – piano, vocal
  - Recorded at Village Recorders, Los Angeles, 1/21/1975. Produced by Neil Young & Ben Keith.
4. "Love Is a Rose" (2:16)
  - Neil Young – guitar, vocal, harmonica; Tim Drummond – bass
  - Recorded at Studio, Broken Arrow Ranch, Woodside, CA, 6/16/1974. Produced by Neil Young & Tim Mulligan.
5. "Homegrown" (2:47)
  - Neil Young – guitar, vocal; Ben Keith – lap slide guitar; Tim Drummond – bass; Karl T. Himmel – drums
  - Recorded at Quadrafonic Sound Studios, Nashville, 12/13/1974. Produced by Neil Young & Elliot Mazer.
6. "Florida" (2:58)
  - Neil Young – wine glass, piano strings, vocal; Ben Keith – wine glass, piano strings, narration
  - Recorded at Village Recorders, Los Angeles, 1/21/1975. Produced by Neil Young & Ben Keith.
7. "Kansas" (2:12)
  - Neil Young – guitar, vocal, harmonica
  - Recorded at Village Recorders, Los Angeles, 1/21/1975. Produced by Neil Young & Ben Keith.
8. "We Don't Smoke It No More" (4:50)
  - Neil Young – guitar, vocal, harmonica; Ben Keith – lap slide guitar, vocal; Tim Drummond – bass; Karl T. Himmel – drums; Stan Szelest – piano; Sandy Mazzeo – vocal
  - Recorded at Studio, Broken Arrow Ranch, Woodside, CA, 12/31/1974. Produced by Neil Young, Ben Keith & Tim Mulligan.
9. "White Line" (3:14)
  - Neil Young – guitar, vocal, harmonica; Robbie Robertson – guitar
  - Recorded at Ramport Studios, London, 9/12/1974. Produced by Neil Young & Elliot Mazer.
10. "Vacancy" (3:59)
  - Neil Young – guitar, vocal, harmonica; Ben Keith – lap slide guitar, vocal; Tim Drummond – bass; Karl T. Himmel – drums; Stan Szelest – Wurlitzer electric piano
  - Recorded at Studio, Broken Arrow Ranch, Woodside, CA, 1/4/1975. Produced by Neil Young, Ben Keith & Tim Mulligan.
11. "Little Wing" (2:10)
  - Neil Young – guitar, vocal, harmonica
  - Recorded at Village Recorders, Los Angeles, 1/21/1975. Produced by Neil Young & Ben Keith.
12. "Star of Bethlehem" (2:42)
  - Neil Young – guitar, vocal, harmonica; Ben Keith – dobro, vocal; Tim Drummond – bass; Karl T. Himmel – drums; Emmylou Harris – vocal
  - Recorded at Quadrafonic Sound Studios, Nashville, 12/13/1974. Produced by Neil Young & Elliot Mazer.

=== Disc 8 – Dume (1975) ===
1. "Ride My Llama" (3:44) – Neil Young and Crazy Horse – previously unreleased version from Zuma sessions
  - Neil Young – guitar, hand claps, vocal; Frank “Poncho” Sampedro – guitar, hand claps; Billy Talbot – bass, hand claps, vocal; Ralph Molina – drums, hand claps, vocal
  - Recorded at House, Point Dume, CA, 5/22/1975. Produced by David Briggs & Neil Young.
2. "Cortez the Killer" (7:32) – Neil Young and Crazy Horse – from the album Zuma
  - Neil Young – guitar, vocal; Frank “Poncho” Sampedro – guitar; Billy Talbot – bass, vocal; Ralph Molina – drums, vocal
  - Recorded at House, Point Dume, CA, 5/22/1975. Produced by David Briggs & Neil Young.
3. "Don't Cry No Tears" (2:37) – Neil Young and Crazy Horse – from the album Zuma
  - Neil Young – guitar, vocal; Frank “Poncho” Sampedro – guitar; Billy Talbot – bass, vocal; Ralph Molina – drums, vocal
  - Recorded at House, Point Dume, CA, 6/1/1975. Produced by David Briggs & Neil Young.
4. "Born to Run" (3:19) – Neil Young and Crazy Horse – previously unreleased song from Zuma sessions
  - Neil Young – guitar, vocal; Frank “Poncho” Sampedro – guitar; Billy Talbot – bass; Ralph Molina – drums
  - Recorded at House, Point Dume, CA, 6/3/1975. Produced by David Briggs & Neil Young.
5. "Barstool Blues" (3:02) – Neil Young and Crazy Horse – from the album Zuma
  - Neil Young – guitar, vocal; Frank “Poncho” Sampedro – guitar; Billy Talbot – bass, vocal; Ralph Molina – drums, vocal
  - Recorded at House, Point Dume, CA, 6/3/1975. Produced by David Briggs & Neil Young.
6. "Danger Bird" (6:55) – Neil Young and Crazy Horse – from the album Zuma
  - Neil Young – guitar, vocal; Frank “Poncho” Sampedro – guitar; Billy Talbot – bass, vocal; Ralph Molina – drums, vocal
  - Recorded at House, Point Dume, CA, 6/3/1975. Produced by David Briggs & Neil Young.
7. "Stupid Girl" (3:11) – Neil Young and Crazy Horse – from the album Zuma
  - Neil Young – guitar, vocal; Frank “Poncho” Sampedro – guitar; Billy Talbot – bass, vocal; Ralph Molina – drums, vocal
  - Recorded at House, Point Dume, CA, 6/8/1975. Produced by David Briggs & Neil Young.
8. "Kansas" (3:35) – Neil Young and Crazy Horse – previously unreleased version from Zuma sessions
  - Neil Young – guitar, vocal; Frank “Poncho” Sampedro – guitar; Billy Talbot – bass; Ralph Molina – drums
  - Recorded at House, Point Dume, CA, 6/12/1975. Produced by David Briggs & Neil Young.
9. "Powderfinger" (7:15) – Neil Young and Crazy Horse – previously unreleased version from Zuma sessions
  - Neil Young – guitar, vocal; Frank “Poncho” Sampedro – guitar; Billy Talbot – bass; Ralph Molina – drums
  - Recorded at House, Point Dume, CA, 6/12/1975. Produced by David Briggs & Neil Young.
10. "Hawaii" (4:26) – Neil Young and Crazy Horse – previously unreleased version from Zuma sessions
  - Neil Young – guitar, vocal; Frank “Poncho” Sampedro – guitar; Billy Talbot – bass; Ralph Molina – drums
  - Recorded at House, Point Dume, CA, 6/18/1975. Produced by David Briggs & Neil Young.
11. "Drive Back" (3:34) – Neil Young and Crazy Horse – from the album Zuma
  - Neil Young – guitar, vocal; Frank “Poncho” Sampedro – guitar; Billy Talbot – bass, vocal; Ralph Molina – Drums, vocal
  - Recorded at House, Point Dume, CA, 6/22/1975. Produced by David Briggs & Neil Young.
12. "Lookin' for a Love" (3:19) – Neil Young and Crazy Horse – from the album Zuma
  - Neil Young – guitar, vocal; Frank “Poncho” Sampedro – guitar; Billy Talbot – bass, vocal; Ralph Molina – drums, vocal
  - Recorded at Studio, Broken Arrow Ranch, 8/29/1975. Produced by Neil Young & Tim Mulligan.
13. "Pardon My Heart" (3:50) – Neil Young and Crazy Horse – from the album Zuma
  - Neil Young – guitar, piano, vocal; Tim Drummond – bass; Billy Talbot – vocal; Ralph Molina – vocal
  - Recorded at Studio, Broken Arrow Ranch, 6/16/1974, and 8/29/1975. Produced by Neil Young & Tim Mulligan.
14. "Too Far Gone" (2:42) – Neil Young and Crazy Horse – previously unreleased version from Zuma sessions
  - Neil Young – guitar, vocal; Frank "Poncho" Sampedro – mandolin
  - Recorded at Studio, Broken Arrow Ranch, 9/5/1975. Produced by Neil Young & Tim Mulligan.
15. "Pocahontas" (3:31) – Neil Young and Crazy Horse – previously unreleased version from Zuma sessions
  - Neil Young – guitar, vocal; Frank “Poncho” Sampedro – guitar; Billy Talbot – bass, vocal; Ralph Molina – drums, vocal
  - Recorded at Studio, Broken Arrow Ranch, 9/6/1975. Produced by Neil Young & Tim Mulligan.
16. "No One Seems to Know" (2:28) – previously unreleased version from Zuma sessions
  - Neil Young – piano, vocal
  - Recorded at Studio, Broken Arrow Ranch, 9/11/1975. Produced by Neil Young & Tim Mulligan.

=== Disc 9 – Look Out for My Love (1975–1976) ===
1. "Like a Hurricane" (8:19) – Neil Young and Crazy Horse – from the album American Stars 'n Bars
  - Neil Young – guitar, vocal; Frank “Poncho” Sampedro – Stringman, vocals; Billy Talbot – bass; Ralph Molina – drums, vocal
  - Recorded at Studio, Broken Arrow Ranch, 11/29/1975. Produced by David Briggs & Neil Young with Tim Mulligan.
2. "Lotta Love" (2:39) – Neil Young and Crazy Horse – from the album Comes a Time
  - Neil Young – guitar, vocal; Frank “Poncho” Sampedro – piano, vocal; Billy Talbot – bass, vocal; Ralph Molina – drums, vocal
  - Recorded at Wally Heider Recording Studios, Hollywood, 1/10/1976. Produced by David Briggs & Neil Young with Tim Mulligan.
3. "Look Out for My Love" (4:07) – Neil Young and Crazy Horse – from the album Comes a Time
  - Neil Young – guitar, vocal; Frank “Poncho” Sampedro – guitar; Billy Talbot – bass, vocal; Ralph Molina – drums, vocal
  - Recorded at Studio, Broken Arrow Ranch, 1/20/1976. Produced by David Briggs & Neil Young with Tim Mulligan.
4. "Separate Ways" (5:25) – The Stills-Young Band – previously unreleased version from Long May You Run sessions
  - Neil Young – guitar, vocal; Stephen Stills – piano, guitar; Joe Lala – percussion; Joe Vitale – drums; George "Chocolate" Perry – bass; Jerry Aiello – organ
  - Recorded at Criteria Studios, Miami, 2/3/1976. Produced by Stephen Stills, Neil Young & Don Gehman.
5. "Let It Shine" (4:46) – The Stills-Young Band – previously unreleased mix from the Long May You Run sessions
  - Neil Young – guitar, harmonica, vocal; Stephen Stills – guitar, vocal; Joe Vitale – drums; George “Chocolate” Perry – bass
  - Recorded at Criteria Studios, Miami, 2/4/1976. Produced by Stephen Stills, Neil Young & Don Gehman
6. "Long May You Run" (3:56) – The Stills-Young Band – from the album Long May You Run
  - Neil Young – guitar, harmonica, vocal; Stephen Stills – guitar, vocal; Joe Lala – percussion, vocal; Joe Vitale – drums, vocal; George "Chocolate" Perry – bass, vocal; Jerry Aiello – organ
  - Recorded at Criteria Studios, Miami, 2/5/1976. Produced by Stephen Stills, Neil Young & Don Gehman.
7. "Fontainebleau" (4:00) – The Stills-Young Band – from the album Long May You Run
  - Neil Young – electric guitar, vocal; Stephen Stills – organ, vocal; Joe Lala – percussion, vocal; Joe Vitale – drums, vocal; George "Chocolate" Perry – bass, vocal; Jerry Aiello – piano
  - Recorded at Criteria Studios, Miami, 2/8/1976. Produced by Stephen Stills, Neil Young & Don Gehman.
8. "Traces" (3:07) – The Stills-Young Band – previously unreleased version from Long May You Run sessions
  - Neil Young – guitar, harmonica, vocal; Stephen Stills – guitar, vocal; Joe Lala – percussion; Joe Vitale – drums; George "Chocolate" Perry – bass, vocal; Jerry Aiello – organ
  - Recorded at Criteria Studios, Miami, 2/8/1976. Produced by Stephen Stills, Neil Young & Don Gehman.
9. "Mellow My Mind" (2:42) – previously unreleased live version
  - Neil Young – banjo, harmonica, vocal
  - Recorded at Festival Hall, Osaka, 3/5/1976. Produced by David Briggs and Neil Young
10. "Midnight on the Bay" (3:09) – previously unreleased live version
  - Neil Young – guitar, harmonica, vocal
  - Recorded at Hammersmith Odeon, London, 3/30/1976. Produced by David Briggs & Neil Young.
11. "Stringman" (3:31) – previously unreleased version
  - Neil Young – piano, guitar, vocal
  - Recorded at Hammersmith Odeon, London, 3/31/1976. Overdubs done at CBS Studios, London, 4/1/1976. Produced by David Briggs & Neil Young.
12. "Mediterranean" (2:36) – previously unreleased song
  - Neil Young – electric guitar, acoustic guitar, vocal
  - Recorded at CBS Studios, London, 4/1/1976. Produced by David Briggs & Neil Young.
13. "Ocean Girl" (3:23) – Crosby, Stills, Nash & Young – previously unreleased version from Long May You Run/aborted Human Highway sessions
  - Neil Young – piano, vocal; Stephen Stills – guitar, vocal; Joe Lala – percussion, vocal; Joe Vitale – drums, vocal; George "Chocolate" Perry – bass, vocal; Jerry Aiello – organ; David Crosby – vocal; Graham Nash – vocal
  - Recorded at Criteria Studios, Miami, 4/14/1976. Produced by Stephen Stills, Neil Young & Don Gehman.
14. "Midnight on the Bay" (4:02) – Crosby, Stills, Nash & Young – previously unreleased version from Long May You Run/aborted Human Highway sessions
  - Neil Young – acoustic guitar, harmonica, vocal; Stephen Stills – guitar, vocal; Joe Lala – percussion, vocal; Joe Vitale – drums, vocal; George "Chocolate" Perry – bass, vocal; Jerry Aiello – organ; David Crosby – vocal; Graham Nash – vocal
  - Recorded at Criteria Studios, Miami, 4/14/1976. Produced by Stephen Stills, Neil Young & Don Gehman.
15. "Human Highway" (3:01) – Crosby, Stills, Nash & Young – previously unreleased version from Long May You Run/aborted Human Highway sessions
  - Neil Young – guitar, vocal; Stephen Stills – bottleneck slide guitar, vocal; David Crosby – vocal; Graham Nash – vocal
  - Recorded at Criteria Studios, Miami, 4/15/1976. Produced by Stephen Stills, Neil Young & Don Gehman.

=== Disc 10 – Odeon Budokan (1976) ===
1. "The Old Laughing Lady" (5:55) – previously unreleased live version
  - Neil Young – guitar, harmonica, vocal
  - Recorded at Hammersmith Odeon, London, 3/31/1976. Produced by David Briggs and Tim Mulligan
2. "After the Gold Rush" (4:29) – previously unreleased live version
  - Neil Young – piano, harmonica, vocal
  - Recorded at Hammersmith Odeon, London, 3/31/1976. Produced by David Briggs and Tim Mulligan
3. "Too Far Gone" (3:17) – previously unreleased live version
  - Neil Young – guitar, vocal
  - Recorded at Hammersmith Odeon, London, 3/31/1976. Produced by David Briggs and Tim Mulligan
4. "Old Man" (3:48) – previously unreleased live version
  - Neil Young – guitar, vocal
  - Recorded at Hammersmith Odeon, London, 3/31/1976. Produced by David Briggs and Tim Mulligan
5. "Stringman" (3:45) – previously unreleased live version
  - Neil Young – piano, vocal
  - Recorded at Hammersmith Odeon, London, 3/31/1976. Produced by David Briggs and Tim Mulligan
6. "Don’t Cry No Tears" (3:12) – previously unreleased live version
  - Neil Young – guitar, vocal; Frank “Poncho” Sampedro – guitar; Billy Talbot – bass, vocal; Ralph Molina – drums, vocal
  - Recorded at Nippon Budokan Hall, Tokyo, 3/10/1976. Produced by David Briggs and Tim Mulligan
7. "Cowgirl in the Sand" (4:56) – previously unreleased live version
  - Neil Young – guitar, vocal; Frank “Poncho” Sampedro – guitar; Billy Talbot – bass, vocal; Ralph Molina – drums, vocal
  - Recorded at Nippon Budokan Hall, Tokyo, 3/11/1976. Produced by David Briggs and Tim Mulligan
8. "Lotta Love" (2:57) – previously unreleased live version
  - Neil Young – guitar, vocal; Frank “Poncho” Sampedro – keyboards; Billy Talbot – bass, vocal; Ralph Molina – drums, vocal
  - Recorded at Nippon Budokan Hall, Tokyo, 3/10/1976. Produced by David Briggs and Tim Mulligan
9. "Drive Back" (4:37) – previously unreleased live version
  - Neil Young – guitar, vocal; Frank “Poncho” Sampedro – guitar; Billy Talbot – bass, vocal; Ralph Molina – drums, vocal
  - Recorded at Nippon Budokan Hall, Tokyo, 3/10/1976. Produced by David Briggs and Tim Mulligan
10. "Cortez the Killer" (7:04) – previously unreleased live version
  - Neil Young – guitar, vocal; Frank “Poncho” Sampedro – guitar; Billy Talbot – bass, vocal; Ralph Molina – drums, vocal
  - Recorded at Nippon Budokan Hall, Tokyo, 3/10/1976. Produced by David Briggs and Tim Mulligan

== Production ==
- Neil Young – production, audio tape research
- L.A. Johnson – production
- John Hanlon – production
- Tim Mulligan – editing, mastering
- Will Mitchell – audio production assistance
- Jeff Pinn – mixing, technical support
- John Hausmann – assistant engineering, analog and digital librarian
- John Nowland – audio tape restoration, analog to digital transferring, audio tape research
- Mike Schaff, Harry Sitam – technical support
- Andrew Mendelson, Chris Bellman – additional mastering
- Joel Bernstein – audio tape research
- Elliot Roberts – direction

Multimedia production

- Bernard Shakey (Neil Young) – direction
- Will Mitchell – production
- Hannah Johnson – production, archiving
- Elliot Rabinowitz – executive production
- Ben Johnson, Atticus Culver-Rease – photography direction
- Toshi Onuki – editing, art direction
- Cindi Peters – Cindi Peters
- Hannah Choe – production assistance
- Joe Mendoza – grip & electric
- Ben Young – dolly operator

Art and text production

- Jenice Heo, Neil Young – art direction and design
- Toshi Onuki – art direction and design, research and compiling, production
- Hannah Johnson – research and compiling, production
- Joel Bernstein – research and compiling
- Babak Saadat, Colin Liang, Kenichiro Ohara – production assistance
- Cindi Peters, Eric Custer, Daniele Taska, Bonnie Levetin, Tom Pope, Misao Ohno, Satoshi Yoneda – image licensing and clearances

== Charts ==
Chart performance for Neil Young Archives Volume II: 1972–1976
Chart (2021)	Peak position
Belgian Albums (Ultratop Flanders)	49
Belgian Albums (Ultratop Wallonia)	24
Dutch Albums (Album Top 100)	37
French Albums (SNEP)	151
German Albums (Offizielle Top 100)	8
Hungarian Albums (MAHASZ)	12
Scottish Albums (Official Charts)	16
Swiss Albums (Schweizer Hitparade)	35
US Top Album Sales (Billboard)	16
US Americana/Folk Albums (Billboard)	7
US Top Current Album Sales (Billboard)	13
