= Neil Young Archives =

Series of archival releases by singer-songwriter Neil Young

The Neil Young Archives is a longtime project by singer-songwriter Neil Young. It started as a series of archival releases featuring previously released as well as unreleased studio and live recordings. It eventually developed into a website featuring almost the whole of Young's recording output throughout his career, available for streaming in high resolution audio format. The project has been long in the making – work began in the late 1980s. Throughout its development, Young himself has made several statements about the material included, release dates, and marketing that have proven false as the project was modified for new multimedia formats and expanded upon to accommodate new releases or other relevant material. As of 2024, the Neil Young Archives series of box sets is scheduled to have five volumes.

The archives are divided into several series. The main series consists of several volumes of box sets, each covering a separate period of the artist's career. The Performance Series consists of individual releases of live material, each representing a specific show or tour. Finally, there is the Special Release Series, which consists of previously unreleased albums. These different series also overlap; for example, two volumes of the Performance Series that are included on each of the first two Archives box set releases are also available separately. Homegrown is also included in its entirety on Neil Young Archives Volume II: 1972–1976 but was also released on its own earlier in 2020.

As of 2019, Young has launched a subscription website and application where all of his music is available to stream in high resolution audio. The Neil Young Archives also include his newspaper, The Times-Contrarian; The Hearse Theater, which shows limited runs of concert films and rare footage; and photos and memorabilia throughout his career.

== Box sets ==
=== Volume I: 1963–1972 ===
The first volume, The Archives Vol. 1 1963–1972, was released on June 2, 2009. Covering Young's early years with The Squires and Buffalo Springfield, it also includes cuts, demos, outtakes and alternate versions of songs from his albums Neil Young, Everybody Knows This Is Nowhere, After the Gold Rush, and Harvest, as well as tracks he recorded with both Crazy Horse and Crosby, Stills, Nash & Young during this time. Also included in the set are several live discs, as well as (on the Blu-Ray/DVD versions) a copy of the long out-of-print film Journey Through the Past, directed by Young in the early 1970s.

Volume I was released as a set of 10 Blu-ray discs in order to present high resolution audio as well as accompanying visual documentation. It is also available as a 10 disc DVD set and an 8 disc CD set. On January 31, 2010, the box set won the Grammy Award for Best Art Direction on a Boxed or Special Limited Edition Package, and was shared by Neil Young along with his art directors Gary Burden and Jenice Heo.

=== Volume II: 1972–1976 ===
Similar in scope to the first box set, Neil Young Archives Volume II: 1972–1976 was officially released as a deluxe box set and for streaming on the Neil Young Archives site on November 20, 2020. Covering Young's work with The Stray Gators, Santa Monica Flyers, Crosby, Stills, Nash & Young, Crazy Horse, and The Stills-Young Band during this period, Vol. II includes album cuts, demos, outtakes and alternate versions of songs from his albums Time Fades Away, Tonight’s the Night, On the Beach, Zuma, and Long May You Run, as well as the then-recently released album Homegrown in its entirety and tracks from CSNY's multiple sessions for their aborted Human Highway album. Also as with Volume I, included in the set are several live discs, including the unreleased live album Odeon Budokan. Volume II was released as a set of 10 CDs (with a deluxe edition containing a hardbound book), and did not have accompanying Blu-ray or DVD editions as Vol. I did due to, as Young has explained, “economic reasons.”

=== Volume III: 1976–1987 ===
Neil Young Archives Volume III: 1976–1987 was released on September 6, 2024. Covering an eleven-year period from 1976–1987, Volume III included, among other tracks, an album and film called Across the Water that further documents his 1976 tour of Japan and Europe with Crazy Horse; A Snapshot in Time, an "audio documentary" of a rehearsal with Nicolette Larson and Linda Ronstadt prior to recording American Stars 'n Bars; Windward Passage, a live album of tracks recorded with The Ducks in Santa Cruz; the unreleased album Oceanside Countryside; Union Hall, a recording of Young rehearsing with Larson and the Give to the Wind Orchestra prior to their November 12, 1977 gig in Bicentennial Park in Miami; an album and film documenting his 1978 Boarding House residency; songs from both his unreleased album Island in the Sun and earlier versions of Old Ways; a live album documenting Young's February 7, 1984, shows with Crazy Horse at The Catalyst; and a disc of live tracks and studio cuts Young recorded with the International Harvesters.

On July 25, 2024, Young announced a pre-sale for members of his Archives website for the upcoming box set. Two distinct versions of this box set were released: a 17 CD standard box set available both online and brick-and-mortar retailers, and a "deluxe" version, available exclusively at Neil Young's Greedy Hand merch store, that also contains 5 Blu-Ray discs. These Blu-Rays will contain eleven films in total, including four that have never been released and are exclusive to this box set. Members of Neil Young Archives that pre-ordered in advance received a 16 track CD sampler and a pin. A 2 LP version of highlights, titled Archives Vol. III - Takes, was also released.

=== Volume IV: 1987–2004 ===
As of 2026, "Volume IV" is expected to be the second-to-last Archives box set to be released, according to a Times-Contrarian article. The set is currently in production and being developed by the Neil Young Archives team. While the exact scope is still being finalized, Volume IV is anticipated to cover the period from 1987 to 2004, beginning with material from his first tour with the Bluenotes in the fall of 1987.

== Performance Series ==
The series of box sets were preceded by individual concert releases, dubbed the Archives Performance Series. This section contains details of releases so far. The releases are ordered in chronological order of recording. The albums were released in a different order, with Volume 2 coming in 2006, Volume 3 in 2007 and Volume 1 included in the first Archives box.

=== 1960s ===
Volume 00: Sugar Mountain – Live at Canterbury House 1968

Sugar Mountain - Live at Canterbury House 1968 is labeled Volume 00 in the Performance Series, but was the third in the series to be released. It features recordings from Young's solo acoustic performances at Canterbury House on 9–10 November 1968. The album was released on December 2, 2008.

Volume 01: Live at the Riverboat 1969

Volume 1 is entitled Live at the Riverboat 1969 and is taken from a series of shows at the Riverboat Coffeehouse in Toronto in February 1969, recorded by Brian Ahern. The CD was released as part of the Archives Vol. I: 1963-1972 box set in June 2009. Chrome Dreams II from certain retailers also included a bonus CD with a preview track from the Riverboat. Different outlets had different CDs, each with a different preview track.

=== 1970s ===
Volume 02: Live at the Fillmore East 1970

Live at the Fillmore East, released in November 2006, features a March 1970 concert with Crazy Horse. The album was released on CD, LP and DVD with high definition 24/96 sound accompanied by still images from the concert. This album was also included as part of the Archives Vol. I: 1963-1972 box set.

Volume 02.5: Live at the Cellar Door

Live at the Cellar Door was recorded in Washington, D.C., during six-show between November 30 and December 2, 1970. This was released on December 10, 2013.

Volume 03: Live at Massey Hall 1971

A solo acoustic performance from January 1971, Live at Massey Hall 1971, saw release in March 2007. The album was released on LP, CD and DVD Video with the DVD version including high definition sound accompanied by 8mm film footage, which sourced from the Stratford, Connecticut, concert three days later (January 22, 1971). This album was also included as part of the Archives Vol. I: 1963-1972 box set.

Volume 03.5: Young Shakespeare

Young Shakespeare was released on March 26, 2021. It is an all-acoustic solo show and recorded at the Shakespeare Theatre in Stratford, Connecticut, on January 22, 1971, just three days after the Massey Hall show. After talks of it possibly being paired with the 50th Anniversary Edition of After the Gold Rush, it was officially available as a stand-alone release along with a companion concert film, which had previously been used for Massey Hall's accompanying DVD release.

Volume 04: Tuscaloosa

Tuscaloosa is a live album featuring recordings from the concert in Tuscaloosa, Alabama, on the 1973 tour with The Stray Gators, during which Time Fades Away was recorded. The album was released on June 7, 2019. Young has since stated on his Archives website that Tuscaloosa is "as close as Time Fades Away II that we'll get." This album was also included as part of the Archives Vol. II: 1972-1976 box set.

Volume 05: Roxy: Tonight's the Night Live 1973

Roxy: Tonight's the Night Live was released on April 24, 2018, with a Record Store Day vinyl release on April 21. The album is culled from a set of shows played during the opening of the Roxy Theatre from September 20–22, 1973. The shows featured Young backed by the Santa Monica Flyers and songs from the recently recorded Tonight's the Night. This album was also included as part of the Archives Vol. II: 1972-1976 box set with an additional performance of "The Losing End" not present on the original release.

Volume 06

Originally projected to be Odeon Budokan, this ended up being released as a Special Release Series album on September 1, 2023. As of now, this catalog number could be earmarked for the Across the Water discs that can be found in the Archives Vol. III box set.

Volume 07: Songs for Judy

Songs for Judy was released digitally and on CD on November 30, 2018, and as a double LP on December 14, 2018. Compiled by Joel Bernstein and Cameron Crowe from solo acoustic performances on the 1976 North American tour, it previously circulated among fans as a bootleg titled The Bernstein Tapes.

Volume 08

Catalogue number possibly reserved for Boarding House, an album compiled from the recordings made during Young's five-day residency at The Boarding House, San Francisco in May 1978; some of these recordings appeared on side A of Rust Never Sleeps. On July 26, 2024, it was announced that this will finally be seeing release as part of the Archives Vol. III box set.

=== 1980s ===
Volume 09: A Treasure

A Treasure documents the International Harvesters tours of 1984–1985. It was first released May 24, 2011 as an LP, with Blu-ray (and accompanying film) and CD following June 14.

Volume 10

This catalog number could possibly be reserved for "Crazy Horse Garage" – a series of concerts by Young & Crazy Horse during their US concert tours in October and November 1986. However, the concert film In a Rusted Out Garage is seeing release as part of the CD/Blu-Ray version of Archives Vol. III.

Volume 11: Bluenote Café

Bluenote Café, released November 13, 2015, documents the 1987/88 tour with the Bluenotes behind the 1988 album This Note's for You.

=== 1990s ===
Volume 11.5: Way Down in the Rust Bucket

Way Down in the Rust Bucket was the first release from his Archives Performance Series for the year 2021, and was released in CD, DVD, vinyl and deluxe box set editions on February 26. A live show that was recorded on November 13, 1990, at the Catalyst in Santa Cruz, California, with Crazy Horse, Young has previously shown all the concert video footage as part of the Movietone section of his Archives website.

Volume 12: Dreamin' Man Live '92

Dreamin' Man Live '92 was released on December 8, 2009, and features all ten songs from the album Harvest Moon (but in different order, locations and dates) performed live in 1992.

=== 2000s ===
Volume 16: Return to Greendale

Return to Greendale was officially released on November 6, 2020. Young has previously shown all the concert video footage as part of the Movietone section of his Archives website. The concert was held in Toronto, Canada in 2003 as the supporting tour for his album, Greendale.

=== 2010s ===
Volume 21: Noise & Flowers

Noise & Flowers is a live album by Neil Young and Promise of the Real. It was released through Reprise Records on August 5, 2022, and recorded during the band's 2019 European tour.

=== 2020s ===
Volume 22: Coastal Soundtrack

Coastal: The Soundtrack is the soundtrack from a documentary film by Daryl Hannah, chronicling the 2023 solo tour by Neil Young. It was released through Reprise Records on April 18, 2025, and recorded during some special intimate shows on the west coast of the United States.

Volume 25: As Time Explodes (Live Album)

Released on Record Store Day (April 18, 2026) by Reprise Records, this double album features performances by Neil Young & The Chrome Hearts during their 31-date "Love Earth" tour of Europe and North America in 2025.

== Official Bootleg Series ==
In September 2020, Young officially announced a new series of releases called the Official Bootleg Series. The original intent behind this series was to duplicate popular bootlegs, down to their original cover art, but upgrading the audio fidelity. However, the concept changed with the first officially announced entry, Carnegie Hall, which will take its audio from the December 4th, 1970 show as opposed to the heavily circulated December 5 midnight set.

On October 7, the first six entries of the Official Bootleg Series were announced, as well as that Niko Bolas will be helping Young in the production of these releases.

An article on the Neil Young Archives site announced a target release date of September 10, 2021. The first was released on October 1, 2021.

Official Bootleg Series 01:

- Carnegie Hall was officially released on October 1, 2021. It features all 23 songs recorded during the December 4, 1970 show as opposed to the heavily circulated December 5 midnight set.

Official Bootleg Series 02:

- High Flyin' is a recording of several of the Ducks' Bay Area shows from their August 1977 run and was officially released in April 14, 2023. The tracks included in this release were assembled by Tim Mulligan and were all professionally recorded either live in studio or with Young's analog truck.

Official Bootleg Series 03:

- "I'm Happy That Y'all Came Down" was released on May 6, 2022. It features a show from February 1, 1971.

Official Bootleg Series 04:

- Royce Hall was released on May 6, 2022. It features a show from January 30, 1971, the source for both "The Needle and the Damage Done" from Harvest and "Love in Mind" from Time Fades Away.

Official Bootleg Series 05:

- Citizen Kane Jr. Blues was released on May 6, 2022. It features a show from May 16, 1974, a legendary show in Young's career.

Official Bootleg Series 06:

- Somewhere Under the Rainbow: November 5, 1973: a heavily bootlegged show featuring the Santa Monica Flyers. It was put up to a fan vote as a potential official release before this series was announced, and it was officially released in April 14, 2023.

== Official Release Series ==
Although the Archives label is predominantly used for previously unreleased material, the name is also being attached to remastered editions of existing albums. Such releases are labeled Neil Young Archives Official Release Series. Since the introduction of PonoMusic, the following albums have been re-released as part of the Official Release Series:

Official Release Series 01:

- Neil Young

Official Release Series 02:

- Everybody Knows This Is Nowhere

Official Release Series 03:

- After the Gold Rush

Official Release Series 04:

- Harvest

Official Release Series 05:

- Time Fades Away

Official Release Series 06:

- On the Beach

Official Release Series 07:

- Tonight's the Night

Official Release Series 08:

- Zuma

Official Release Series 08.5:

- Long May You Run

Official Release Series 09:

- American Stars 'n Bars

Official Release Series 10:

- Comes a Time

Official Release Series 11:

- Rust Never Sleeps

Official Release Series 12:

- Live Rust

Official Release Series 13:

- Hawks & Doves

Official Release Series 14:

- Re·ac·tor

Official Release Series 20:

- This Note's For You

Official Release Series 21:

- Eldorado (EP)

Official Release Series 22:

- Freedom

Official Release Series 23+:

- Ragged Glory - Smell the Horse

Official Release Series 24:

- WELD

Official Release Series 25:

- ARC

Official Release Series 26:

- Harvest Moon

Official Release Series 27:

- Unplugged

Official Release Series 28:

- Sleeps with Angels

Official Release Series 29:

- Mirror Ball

Official Release Series 30:

- Dead Man (soundtrack)

Compact disc versions of the first four above albums were released on 14 July 2009. In addition, the albums were reissued as limited edition box sets on 24 November 2009, in both 180-gram vinyl and 24k gold CD versions. 140-gram vinyl editions of the individual albums were also issued on that date. On the 28th of November 2014, the series no. 05-08 were also reissued as limited edition vinyl box sets. When the PonoMusic Store went live in the end of 2014, another six albums were reissued as digital downloads, making a total of 14 albums available in 24 Bit & 192 kHz (including the 1973 album Time Fades Away, which hadn't been officially re-released before then).

=== Digital Masterpiece Series ===
The Digital Masterpiece Series was the predecessor to the Official Release Series (and the Neil Young Archives as a whole). In 2003 and 2004, Neil Young released On the Beach, American Stars 'N Bars, Hawks & Doves, and Re·ac·tor on HDCD-mastered compact disc and DVD-Audio for the first time. These albums have been re-classified as Official Release Series entries on subsequent vinyl reissues.

== Special Release Series ==
Neil Young has also announced a part of the archives known as the Special Release Series. Toast, an album recorded in 2000 with Crazy Horse, was the first album to be announced as being part of the Special Release Series. Though announced in 2008, Toast remained unreleased until July 8, 2022. It was then announced that The Archives Vol. II would include four SRS releases: the studio albums Homegrown, Chrome Dreams and Oceanside/Countryside, and the live album Odeon-Budokan. Homegrown was released standalone in June 2020, before Odeon Budokan was released as part of Neil Young Archives Vol. II: 1972-1976 and Chrome Dreams followed with an official release in August 2023. Oceanside/Countryside is scheduled for a future release, likely as part of The Archives Vol. III.

Volume 01: Early Daze

Long talked about by Neil Young over the years, including in his autobiography Waging Heavy Peace, Early Daze is a collection of rare and unreleased early studio recordings by Neil Young with Crazy Horse. The 10 songs featured on this album were all recorded in 1969 with the original Crazy Horse line-up of Danny Whitten, Ralph Molina, Billy Talbot, and Jack Nitzsche. Early Daze finally saw official release on June 28th, 2024.

Volume 02: Homegrown

Homegrown, a long lost unreleased 1975 album, was finally announced for a release in early 2020. Originally scheduled for release on April 17 as part of that year's Record Store Day, it was delayed until June 19 due to the COVID-19 pandemic.

Volume 03: Dume

A double LP with Crazy Horse drawn from the 1975 Zuma sessions, including most of the material that would appear on Zuma, alternate versions of songs that appear on Rust Never Sleeps, Homegrown, and Hitchhiker, as well as other unreleased songs from the period. It was released as part of the Neil Young Archives Vol. II: 1972-1976 box set on November 20, 2020. A standalone vinyl version was released on February 23, 2024.

Volume 04: Odeon Budokan

An unreleased live album featuring recordings from the 1976 shows at Budokan Hall, Tokyo and Hammersmith Odeon, London with Crazy Horse, Odeon Budokan was released as part of the Neil Young Archives Vol. II: 1972-1976 box set on November 20, 2020. It had been temporarily scheduled for a stand-alone release in 2019, but was delayed in favor of Tuscaloosa. A standalone vinyl version was eventually released on September 1, 2023.

Volume 05: Hitchhiker

Hitchhiker features an entirely solo 1976 session at Indigo Ranch Recording Studio in Malibu, California, possibly intended for release in the late 1970s but rejected by Reprise at the time. It was released on September 8, 2017, becoming the first officially released SRS volume.

Volume 06: Chrome Dreams

Chrome Dreams, officially released on August 11, 2023, is a showcase of songs that Young had recorded over the previous two years, having been compiled from several different sessions with various collaborators and backing musicians. First compiled as an acetate for consideration as an album for release in 1977, a copy of the acetate was widely circulated as a bootleg in the decades prior to its release.

Volume 07: Oceanside/Countryside

Oceanside/Countryside, officially released on March 7, 2025, is the precursor to Comes a Time, featuring many songs from that album in different mixes, as well as additional songs from the May '77 Crazy Mama sessions.

Volume 09: Toast

Released on July 8, 2022, Toast is an originally-shelved Neil Young & Crazy Horse album that was recorded in 2001. After not being satisfied with the results initially, it was set aside so Neil could focus on recording Are You Passionate?, his album with Booker T. & the M.G.'s.

Volume 10: Music from Paradox the Film

Paradox was released on March 23, 2018.

== Scheduled/possible upcoming releases ==
Young has mentioned many as-of-yet unreleased studio albums and live albums that he has recorded over the years, including :

- Homefires (1974-1975) – Likely to be a collection of outtakes and additional recordings that were made during the Homegrown era.
- Old Ways I (1983) – original version of Old Ways
- Hit 39 (1985) – A collection of Old Ways outtakes and additional recordings made with the International Harvesters in 1985.
- Times Square (1989) – Early version of Freedom recorded with the Restless
- Live Freedom (1989) – Live album
- Mirror Ball Live (1995) – Live album with Pearl Jam
- A Long Time Now (2001) – Live album with Crazy Horse
- Alchemy (2012–13) – Live album with Crazy Horse
- The Tower – Philadelphia (2018) – Live album
- Polar Vortex (2019) – Live album
