= Early Daze =

Studio album by Neil Young and Crazy Horse
- Released: June 28, 2024
- Recorded: January 17 – October 17, 1969
- Studio: Sunset Sound, Hollywood; Wally Heider Recording Studios, Hollywood; Larrabee Sound Studios, Hollywood
- Genre: Hard rock; country rock
- Length: 38:36
- Label: Reprise
- Producer: Neil Young; David Briggs; Jack Nitzsche

Neil Young chronology
Fuckin' Up (2024)	Early Daze (2024)	Neil Young Archives Volume III: 1976–1987 (2024)

Crazy Horse chronology
Fuckin' Up (2024)	Early Daze (2024)

Early Daze is the forty-seventh studio album by Neil Young, featuring his backing band Crazy Horse. Young has referenced it on multiple occasions, including 12 years earlier, in his biography Waging Heavy Peace. After being postponed and teased several times, Neil Young announced in May that he would be releasing the album on June 28, 2024.

== Critical reception ==
Professional ratings
Aggregate scores
Source	Rating
Metacritic	83/100
Review scores
Source	Rating
AllMusic	4.5/5 stars
Mojo	4/5 stars
PopMatters	7/10
Rolling Stone	4/5 stars
Uncut	7/10

Early Daze received a score of 79 out of 100 on review aggregator Metacritic based on three critics' reviews, which the website categorised as "generally favorable". Mojo cited that the album was "short but sweet", and Uncut said that, while the album was not remarkable, it gives insight into how much "repetitive, labour intensive hackwork" goes into transforming material into actual finished albums. PopMatters' Justin Cober-Lake said that, while the album highlights Neil Young's early days, it "adds only a little bit to our understanding of who the musicians were and are".

== Recording history ==
Neil Young first met with Crazy Horse for the 1969 album Everybody Knows This Is Nowhere, but certain songs never made the cut or were recorded after the fact. All 10 songs were recorded with the first Crazy Horse lineup, which included Danny Whitten (guitar and lead vocals), Billy Talbot (bass), Ralph Molina (drums) and Jack Nitzsche (piano). None of the songs are unreleased, as all have appeared on other albums, with and without Neil Young. However, six of the songs were revealed to be unreleased versions: "Come On Baby Let's Go Downtown" (later released on 1975 Tonight's the Night with a different recording), "Winterlong", "Wonderin'", "Look at All the Things", "Helpless", and "Down by the River" (with alternate lead, and perhaps also backing vocals). Two alternate mixes appear as "Birds" and "Everybody's Alone," while "Cinnamon Girl" appears as the original 7 inch single, and "Dance Dance Dance" as it appears on Neil Young Archives Volume 1 1963–1972.

== Track listing ==
1. "Dance Dance Dance" – 2:36
  - Neil Young (guitar, vocal), Danny Whitten (guitar, vocal), Billy Talbot (bass), Ralph Molina (drums, vocal), Jack Nitzsche (tambourine)
  - Recorded at Larrabee Studios, 10/17/1969.
  - Recording first released with a shorter fadeout on Neil Young Archives Volume 1 in 2009.
  - Song first released on Crazy Horse's 1971 solo album entitled Crazy Horse.
2. "Come On Baby Let's Go Downtown" – 4:12
  - Neil Young (guitar, vocal), Danny Whitten (guitar, vocal), Billy Talbot (bass), Ralph Molina (drums, vocal), Jack Nitzsche (piano)
  - Recorded at Larrabee Studios, 10/17/1969.
  - Song first released as "Downtown" on Crazy Horse in 1971, later released on Tonight's the Night in 1975.
3. "Winterlong" – 3:39
  - Neil Young (guitar, vocal), Danny Whitten (guitar, vocal), Billy Talbot (bass), Ralph Molina (drums, vocal), Jack Nitzsche (piano)
  - Recorded at Larrabee Studios, 10/17/1969.
  - Song first released on Decade in 1977.
4. "Everybody's Alone" – 2:31
  - Neil Young (guitar, piano, vocal), Danny Whitten (guitar, vocals), Billy Talbot (bass), Ralph Molina (drums, vocal)
  - Recorded at Sunset Sound, Hollywood, 8/4/1969.
  - Recording first released as a different mix on Neil Young Archives Volume 1 in 2009.
5. "Wonderin'" – 2:19
  - Neil Young (guitar, vibes, vocal), Danny Whitten (guitar, vocal), Billy Talbot (bass), Ralph Molina (drums, vocal)
  - Recorded at Sunset Sound, Hollywood, 8/7/1969.
  - Song first released on Everybody's Rockin' (1983) as a rockabilly song, although the song dates back to 1969.
6. "Cinnamon Girl" – 3:01
  - Neil Young (guitar, vocal, handclaps), Danny Whitten (guitar, vocal, handclaps), Billy Talbot (bass, handclaps), Ralph Molina (drums, vocal, handclaps)
  - Recorded at Wally Heider Recording Studios, Hollywood, 3/20/1969.
  - Recording appears on Everybody Knows This Is Nowhere (1969) and the original 7 inch single.
7. "Look at All the Things" – 2:58
  - Neil Young (guitar, vocal), Danny Whitten (guitar, vocal), Billy Talbot (bass), Ralph Molina (drums, vocal)
  - Recorded at Wally Heider Recording Studios, Hollywood, 10/9/1969.
  - Song first released on Crazy Horse in 1971.
8. "Helpless" – 4:39
  - Neil Young (guitar, vocal), Danny Whitten (guitar, vocal), Billy Talbot (bass), Ralph Molina (drums, vocal)
  - Recorded at Sunset Sound, Hollywood, 10/9/1969.
  - Song first appears with Crosby, Stills, Nash & Young on Deja Vu in 1970
9. "Birds" – 3:38
  - Neil Young (guitar, vocal), Danny Whitten (guitar, vocal), Billy Talbot (bass), Ralph Molina (drums, vocal)
  - Recorded at Sunset Sound, Hollywood, 8/3/1969.
  - Recording first released as a different mix on Neil Young Archives Volume 1 in 2009.
  - Song first appeared on After the Gold Rush in 1970.
10. "Down by the River" – 9:03
  - Neil Young (guitar, vocal), Danny Whitten (guitar, vocal), Billy Talbot (bass), Ralph Molina (drums, vocal)
  - Recorded at Wally Heider Recording Studios, Hollywood, 1/17/1969.
  - Song first released on Everybody Knows This Is Nowhere in 1969.

== Personnel ==
Neil Young & Crazy Horse

- Neil Young – guitar, vocals, piano (4), vibes (5), handclaps (6), production, writing (1-6, 8-10)
- Danny Whitten – guitar, vocals, handclaps (6), writing (2, 7)
- Billy Talbot – bass, handclaps (6)
- Ralph Molina – drums, vocals, handclaps (6)
- Jack Nitzsche – piano (1–3), production (1)

Additional contributors

- David Briggs – production (2–10)
- John Nowland – mixing (1–4, 7–8)
- John Hanlon – mixing (4–5, 8–9)
- Jeff Pinn – mixing assistance
- Chris Bellman – mastering
- Frank Gironda – direction
- Gary Burden – art direction
- Jenice Heo – art direction
- Al Kramer – cover photos
- Annalie Kothschild – spread photo

== Charts ==
Chart performance for Early Daze
Chart (2024)	Peak position
Austrian Albums (Ö3 Austria)	20
Belgian Albums (Ultratop Flanders)	42
Belgian Albums (Ultratop Wallonia)	66
German Albums (Offizielle Top 100)	12
Hungarian Physical Albums (MAHASZ)	6
Japanese Hot Albums (Billboard Japan)	88
Scottish Albums (OCC)	14
Spanish Albums (Promusicae)	67
Swedish Physical Albums (Sverigetopplistan)	2
Swiss Albums (Schweizer Hitparade)	19
UK Album Downloads (OCC)	79
US Americana/Folk Albums (Billboard)	23
US Top Album Sales (Billboard)	17
US Top Current Album Sales (Billboard)	17
US Indie Store Album Sales (Billboard)	4
US Vinyl Albums (Billboard)	18
