= Tuscaloosa (album) =

Live album by Neil Young and the Stray Gators
- Released: June 7, 2019
- Recorded: February 5, 1973
- Venue: Memorial Coliseum, University of Alabama, Tuscaloosa
- Genre: Folk rock; country rock
- Length: 52:35
- Label: Reprise
- Producer: Neil Young; Elliot Mazer

Neil Young chronology
Songs for Judy (2018)	Tuscaloosa (2019)	Colorado (2019)

Archives Performance Series chronology
PS03.5: Young Shakespeare (2021)	PS04: Tuscaloosa (2019)	PS05: Roxy: Tonight's the Night Live (2018)

Professional ratings
Review scores
Source	Rating
AllMusic	4/5 stars

Tuscaloosa is a live album by Canadian-American musician Neil Young, released on June 7, 2019, on American record label Reprise Records. It is Volume 04 in the Performance Series of Neil Young Archives.

The album features recordings from the February 5, 1973, concert in Tuscaloosa, Alabama, which was part of Young's Time Fades Away tour with his backing band The Stray Gators. Unlike the album Time Fades Away, which was compiled from later tour dates, the lineup features drummer Kenny Buttrey (who was later replaced by Johnny Barbata). The album doesn't feature the whole concert, as not all the songs were captured to tape, while "The Loner" and "On the Way Home" were not included for various reasons ("The Loner" eventually was made available for streaming for Archives subscribers in 2020).

The album was also included in the Archives Volume II boxset released in 2020.

Tuscaloosa was originally released on Neil Young's website through a monthly subscription that included other benefits for fans, for Young was known to criticize streaming platforms as he claimed they provided low-resolution music streaming quality and unequal payment methods to artists for every stream.

== Track listing ==
All songs written by Neil Young.

No.	Title	Length
1.	"Here We Are in the Years"	3:56
2.	"After the Gold Rush"	4:42
3.	"Out on the Weekend"	5:29
4.	"Harvest"	4:14
5.	"Old Man"	4:17
6.	"Heart of Gold"	3:48
7.	"Time Fades Away"	6:10
8.	"Lookout Joe"	4:59
9.	"New Mama"	3:01
10.	"Alabama"	3:50
11.	"Don't Be Denied"	8:09

== Personnel ==
- Neil Young – vocals, guitar, piano, harmonica

The Stray Gators

- Ben Keith – pedal steel, slide guitar, vocals
- Jack Nitzsche – piano, vocals
- Tim Drummond – bass
- Kenny Buttrey – drums

Engineering and production

- Neil Young, Elliot Mazer – production
- John Hanlon – mixing
- Chris Bellman – mastering
- Joel Bernstein – photos

== Charts ==
Chart (2019)	Peak position
Austrian Albums (Ö3 Austria)	28
Belgian Albums (Ultratop Flanders)	48
Belgian Albums (Ultratop Wallonia)	30
Dutch Albums (Album Top 100)	57
Finnish Albums (Suomen virallinen lista)	40
French Albums (SNEP)	59
German Albums (Offizielle Top 100)	20
Hungarian Albums (MAHASZ)	4
Irish Albums (IRMA)	52
Italian Albums (FIMI)	55
Scottish Albums (OCC)	8
Spanish Albums (PROMUSICAE)	23
Swedish Albums (Sverigetopplistan)	39
Swiss Albums (Schweizer Hitparade)	36
UK Albums (OCC)	30
US Billboard 200	108
US Top Rock Albums (Billboard)	20
US Americana/Folk Albums (Billboard)	3
US Vinyl Albums (Billboard)	2
US Indie Store Album Sales (Billboard)	1
