= Crazy Horse (album) =

Studio album by Crazy Horse
- Released: February 1971
- Recorded: 1970
- Studio: Wally Heider (San Francisco); Sunset Sound (Los Angeles); A&M (Hollywood)
- Genre: Country rock, roots rock, hard rock
- Length: 38:59
- Label: Reprise
- Producer: Jack Nitzsche, Bruce Botnick

Crazy Horse chronology
Everybody Knows This Is Nowhere (1969)	Crazy Horse (1971)	Loose (1972)

Professional ratings
Review scores
Source	Rating
AllMusic	4.5/5 stars
Christgau's Record Guide	A−

Crazy Horse is the debut album by Crazy Horse, released in 1971 by Reprise Records. It is the only album by the band to feature Danny Whitten recorded without Neil Young, and it peaked at No. 84 on the Billboard 200 album chart.

== Background ==
Members of this band had already released an album in 1968 as The Rockets and had appeared on record twice with Neil Young as Crazy Horse. The core trio from the Rockets, Danny Whitten, Billy Talbot, and Ralph Molina, provided instrumental backing for Young's 1969 album Everybody Knows This Is Nowhere, and performed on most songs from Young's 1970 album After the Gold Rush. Producer/keyboardist Jack Nitzsche, who had been a member of Phil Spector's Wrecking Crew and played on records by the Rolling Stones, had worked with Young on his debut solo album and on tracks for Buffalo Springfield. He was drafted into Crazy Horse to back up Young on their short tour in early 1970. During sessions for Gold Rush, they met teenage multi-instrumentalist Nils Lofgren, who joined the band in time for this album. The band got a contract with Reprise Records after the exposure garnered from their association with Young.

This was Whitten's last recording before his dismissal from the group and subsequent death from an alcohol/diazepam overdose in 1972. Due to Whitten’s increasingly erratic performances (stemming from a heroin addiction and longstanding rheumatoid arthritis), guitarist Ry Cooder was retained as a session musician on three tracks. Cooder had worked previously with Nitzsche on sessions for the Stones and Young's debut solo album.

The album contains compositions from four principal writers. Whitten's ballad "I Don't Want to Talk About It" would be covered by a variety of artists, including Rita Coolidge; Everything but the Girl on their 1988 album Idlewild; and Rod Stewart, who had a chart-topping hit with the song in the United Kingdom, taken from his 1975 album Atlantic Crossing. Young's "Dance Dance Dance" was covered by The New Seekers in 1972, and Randy Newman had already performed Nitzsche's "Gone Dead Train" on the soundtrack for the 1970 film Performance by Donald Cammell and Nicolas Roeg. The song was also covered by the Scottish hard rock band Nazareth on their 1977 album Expect No Mercy; the group had previously covered "Beggars Day" on their 1975 album Hair of the Dog.

A live version of "Downtown" by Whitten and Young would appear on Young's 1975 album Tonight's the Night, entitled "(Come On Baby Let's Go) Downtown." On this Crazy Horse album and Neil Young's 2006 archival release Live at the Fillmore East 1970, the song is credited to Whitten alone. This song is not to be confused with "Downtown" from Young's 1995 album Mirror Ball.

Crazy Horse was released on compact disc on March 22, 1994, as part of the Warner Brothers archive series, produced for compact disc by Lee Herschberg. It appeared in its entirety as part of Rhino Handmade's Scratchy compilation from 2005, which also included outtakes from the sessions for this album. The compilation is no longer in print.

== Track listing ==
Side one
No.	Title	Writer(s)	Length
1.	"Gone Dead Train"	Russ Titelman, Jack Nitzsche	4:06
2.	"Dance, Dance, Dance"	Neil Young	2:10
3.	"Look at All the Things"	Danny Whitten	3:13
4.	"Beggars Day"	Nils Lofgren	4:28
5.	"I Don't Want to Talk About It"	Whitten	5:18

Side two
No.	Title	Writer(s)	Length
1.	"Downtown"	Whitten, Young (uncredited on this album)	3:14
2.	"Carolay"	Titelman, Nitzsche	2:52
3.	"Dirty, Dirty"	Whitten	3:31
4.	"Nobody"	Lofgren	2:35
5.	"I'll Get By"	Whitten	3:08
6.	"Crow Jane Lady"	Nitzsche	4:24

== Personnel ==
- Danny Whitten – guitars, backing vocals; lead vocals except as indicated below
- Nils Lofgren – guitars, backing vocals; lead vocals on "Beggar's Day"
- Jack Nitzsche – piano, backing vocals; lead vocals on "Crow Jane Lady"
- Billy Talbot – bass, backing vocals
- Ralph Molina – drums, backing vocals; lead vocals on "Dance, Dance, Dance"

Additional personnel

- Ry Cooder – slide guitar on "I Don't Want to Talk About It," "Dirty, Dirty" and "Crow Jane Lady"
- Gib Guilbeau – violin on "Dance, Dance, Dance"

Technical

- Jack Nitzsche, Bruce Botnick – producer
- Gary Burden – art direction, design
- Joel Bernstein – photography
- Lee Herschberg – digital mastering
- Elliot Roberts, Ronald Stone – artist management
