= Songs for Judy =

Live album by Neil Young
- Released: November 30, 2018
- Recorded: November 6 – 24, 1976
- Venue: Various
- Genre: Folk rock
- Length: 79:14
- Label: Shakey Pictures Records
- Producer: Joel Bernstein; Cameron Crowe; David Briggs; Neil Young

Neil Young chronology
Roxy: Tonight's the Night Live (2018)	Songs for Judy (2018)	Tuscaloosa (2019)

Archives Performance Series chronology
PS05: Roxy: Tonight's the Night Live (2018)	PS07: Songs for Judy (2018)	PS09: A Treasure (2011)

Professional ratings
Review scores
Source	Rating
Allmusic	4/5 stars
Pitchfork	8.0/10
Rolling Stone	3.5/5 stars

Songs for Judy is a live album by Canadian / American musician Neil Young, released on November 30, 2018, on Shakey Pictures Records. It is Volume 07 in the Performance Series of Neil Young Archives. The album features recordings from Young's solo acoustic sets during the November 1976 United States tour with Crazy Horse.

In spring 1970, Young toured with Crazy Horse. He opened the shows with a solo acoustic set before bringing out Crazy Horse for a set of electric material. Live At The Fillmore East documents that tour.

In the fall 1976 tour that Songs For Judy documents, he did the same. During his acoustic sets, Young played different songs each night rather than the same songs at every show. As a result, he played a total of 22 acoustic songs throughout the course of the tour, each of which appears on Songs For Judy.

In addition, whereas Live at the Fillmore East documents only electric performances and omits acoustic material, Songs For Judy does the opposite and documents only acoustic performances.

== Background ==
Joel Bernstein, whom Young brought on tour as a guitar tech, recorded the shows directly from the PA feed to a cassette desk for personal listening. Together with his friend Cameron Crowe they compiled and sequenced a set of the best performances; a copy of this tape was later stolen and began to circulate among fans as The Joel Bernstein Tapes bootleg. The album features the same performances as the original compilation, with multitrack mixes replacing Bernstein's cassette recordings where possible; unlike the original compilation, songs are set in chronological order of performance dates.

A number of songs performed on the tour were unreleased at the time, including "Too Far Gone" and "White Line" which would appear in studio form years later on Freedom (1989) and Ragged Glory (1990), respectively, and "Give Me Strength," which was featured on 2017 archival release Hitchhiker. The song "No One Seems to Know" makes its first appearance on any official Neil Young release.

The name Songs for Judy originates from Young's story (told in the album introduction) about hallucinating during one of the shows and seeing Judy Garland in the orchestra pit.

I saw Judy Garland down there tonight, earlier. She was wearing a red dress with red lipstick and she had... one of those music portfolios; it said "Somewhere Over the Rainbow," and a picture of her as a little girl, looking up at me with the blue sky behind her. And there she was: Judy Garland, in her red dress with a piece of music, and she looked up at me and she said, "How's the business Neil?" You don't have to believe me.

== Track listing ==
All songs written by Neil Young.

No.	Title	Recording Date and Location	Length
1.	"Songs for Judy Intro"	November 6, 1976, Balch Fieldhouse, Boulder, CO	3:25
2.	"Too Far Gone"	November 6, 1976, Balch Fieldhouse, Boulder, CO	3:15
3.	"No One Seems to Know"	November 7, 1976, Balch Fieldhouse, Boulder, CO	2:29
4.	"Heart of Gold"	November 10, 1976, Tarrant County Convention Center, Fort Worth, TX	2:53
5.	"White Line"	November 10, 1976, Tarrant County Convention Center, Fort Worth, TX	2:45
6.	"Love Is a Rose"	November 11, 1976, The Summit, Houston, TX	2:20
7.	"After the Gold Rush"	November 11, 1976, The Summit, Houston, TX	4:15
8.	"Human Highway"	November 14, 1976, Dane County Veterans Memorial Coliseum, Madison, WI	3:04
9.	"Tell Me Why"	November 15, 1976, Auditorium Theater, Chicago, IL	3:34
10.	"Mr. Soul"	November 20, 1976, Palladium, New York, NY	3:06
11.	"Mellow My Mind"	November 20, 1976, Palladium, New York, NY	2:30
12.	"Give Me Strength"	November 20, 1976, Palladium, New York, NY (Late show)	3:26
13.	"A Man Needs a Maid"	November 20, 1976, Palladium, New York, NY (Late show)	4:54
14.	"Roll Another Number (for the Road)"	November 22, 1976, Music Hall, Boston, MA (Late show)	2:22
15.	"Journey Through the Past"	November 22, 1976, Music Hall, Boston, MA (Late show)	3:17
16.	"Harvest"	November 22, 1976, Music Hall, Boston, MA (Late show)	2:42
17.	"Campaigner"	November 22, 1976, Music Hall, Boston, MA (Late show)	3:30
18.	"Old Laughing Lady" (includes "Guilty Train")	November 24, 1976, Fox Theatre, Atlanta, GA (Early show)	5:18
19.	"The Losing End (When You're on)"	November 24, 1976, Fox Theatre, Atlanta, GA (Late show)	3:52
20.	"Here We Are in the Years"	November 24, 1976, Fox Theatre, Atlanta, GA (Late show)	3:53
21.	"The Needle and the Damage Done"	November 24, 1976, Fox Theatre, Atlanta, GA (Early show)	2:27
22.	"Pocahontas"	November 24, 1976, Fox Theatre, Atlanta, GA (Late show)	3:48
23.	"Sugar Mountain"	November 24, 1976, Fox Theatre, Atlanta, GA (Late show)	6:08

== Personnel ==
- Neil Young – vocals, acoustic guitar, piano, banjo, harmonica, Stringman

Engineering and production

- Joel Bernstein, Cameron Crowe, David Briggs, Neil Young – production
- Tracks 1–9, 23:
  - Joel Bernstein – cassette recording
  - Tim Mulligan – original PA mix
- Tracks 10–22:
  - Dave Hewitt – multitrack recording
  - Phil Gitamer – assistant engineer
- John Nowland, Tim Mulligan – mixing
- John Hanlon – post-production
- Tim Mulligan – mastering (Redwood Digital)
- Chris Bellman – mastering (Bernie Grundman Mastering)
- Daryl Hannah – artwork
- Alex Tenta – design, layout

== Charts ==
Chart (2018)	Peak position
Austrian Albums (Ö3 Austria)	57
Belgian Albums (Ultratop Flanders)	35
Belgian Albums (Ultratop Wallonia)	100
Dutch Albums (Album Top 100)	47
French Albums (SNEP)	138
German Albums (Offizielle Top 100)	54
Irish Albums (IRMA)	74
Italian Albums (FIMI)	79
Scottish Albums (OCC)	38
Spanish Albums (Promusicae)	68
Swedish Albums (Sverigetopplistan)	55
UK Albums (OCC)	62
US Top Album Sales (Billboard)	43
US Top Rock Albums (Billboard)	37
US Americana/Folk Albums (Billboard)	6
US Top Current Album Sales (Billboard)	28
US Indie Store Album Sales (Billboard)	4
