= Come On Baby Let's Go Downtown =

Song written by Danny Whitten

"Downtown"

Single by Crazy Horse

from the album Crazy Horse
- B-side: "Crow Jane Lady"
- Released: February 1971
- Recorded: 1970
- Genre: Rock
- Length: 3:14
- Label: Reprise
- Songwriter(s): Danny Whitten; Neil Young
- Producer(s): Jack Nitzsche; Bruce Botnick

"Come On Baby Let's Go Downtown"

Song by Neil Young and Crazy Horse

from the album Tonight's the Night
- Released: June 20, 1975
- Recorded: March 7, 1970
- Venue: Fillmore East, New York City
- Genre: Rock
- Length: 3:35
- Label: Reprise
- Songwriter(s): Danny Whitten; Neil Young
- Producer(s): David Briggs; Neil Young

"Come On Baby Let's Go Downtown", also known as "(Come On Baby Let's Go) Downtown" or "Downtown", is a song written by Danny Whitten, possibly in collaboration with Neil Young, that was first released on Crazy Horse's 1971 album Crazy Horse. A live version was later released on multiple Neil Young albums, most famously on his 1975 album Tonight's the Night, and then on his 2006 album Live at the Fillmore East.

== Lyrics and music ==
The lyrics of "Come On Baby Let's Go Downtown" deal with a drug addict looking to score heroin. Another line assures us that "sure enough they'll be selling stuff when the moon begins to rise." The refrain describes how the singer is "dealing with the man" who is "sellin' stuff."

Cash Box described the single as "a Young-tinged rock side pegged as the track at FM stations" that could reach the Top 40. Music lecturer Ken Bielen described the song as "an up-tempo track" with "a barrage of electric guitar chords." Pitchfork critic Mark Richardson described the song as a "joyous rave up" despite the somber theme. Allmusic critic William Ruhlmann praised Whitten's writing of the song, as well as his "rocking out" in his performance on the Crazy Horse album.

The writing credits on Tonight's the Night credited the song to both Whitten and Young, but on Crazy Horse's debut album and Live at the Fillmore East the song was credited solely to Whitten. Upon the Crazy Horse single release, Record World said that Young "assisted in the writing" of the song. Young has stated in concert that the song was written mostly by Whitten.

== Live versions ==
"Come On Baby Let's Go Downtown" was included in the set list of concerts that Young was performing with Crazy Horse at the Fillmore East in March 1970 with Whitten taking the lead vocals. Young had recorded 9 songs for the Tonight's the Night album in 1973 but did not feel the album was finished, and so the album sat unreleased for two years. Young's manager Elliot Mazer suggested adding three older songs to the album - "Come On Baby Let's Go Downtown" as well as "Borrowed Tune" and "Lookout Joe." With those three songs added, Young eventually decided to release the Tonight's the Night album in 1975, instead of Homegrown, which he had recently recorded. "Come On Baby Let's Go Downtown" was released as a single from the album.

Music critic Nigel Williamson stated that although Young does not sing on "Come On Baby Let's Go Downtown," the song is integral to the concept of the album, most of which was written and recorded in the shadow of the deaths of Whitten and Young's roadie Bruce Berry to drug overdoses. Young referred to those sessions as being essentially a wake for Whitten and Berry. Whitten died of a heroin overdose on November 18, 1972, after Young had fired him from the Time Fades Away project, possibly with drugs he bought with money Young had given him. Music critic Johnny Rogan similarly stated that the performance "intensifies the mood" of the album and said that "hearing Whitten in this context on lead vocal is a poignant reminder of all that was lost to the needle and works even more effectively than would another Young song on the same theme." Rolling Stone Magazine critic Dave Marsh stated that the performance "serves as a metaphor for the album's haunted, frightened emotional themes" and said that "musically, Whitten's guitar and voice complement, challenge and inspire Young." Allmusic critic Matthew Greenwald stated that this version is "a fabulous country barnburner, which encapsulates Crazy Horse's loud-and-proud appeal." He also noted that it was a sensible song to include on the album since it deals with drug culture but "with a lighter touch than some of Young's songs on the album." Music journalist Andrew Grant Jackson stated that despite the tragedy that led to the song's inclusion on the album, "the euphoria [Whitten] and Young share on the harmonies is palpable." Although Tonight's the Night producer David Briggs felt that the material added to the original album recordings detracted from the mood of the album, Young biographer Jimmy McDonough disagreed, saying that "when gone-dead Danny Whitten's voice jumps out of the speakers singing 'Come On Baby Let's Go Downtown,' it just hits you in the gut that much harder." Pitchfork reviewer Mark Richardson stated that "Whitten’s death seems impossible when this song crackles with so much life. It’s both a celebration and a lament. Hearing their voices in unison on the chorus is a kind of prayer, two music lifers realizing in a moment the power of what they could do together." Music journalist David Downing called it "great rock 'n' roll," saying that Whitten singing it in this context gives the song added resonance.

In 2006, Young released Live at the Fillmore East, which included most of the Young's electric set from the show which included the performance of "Come On Baby Let's Go Downtown" that was on Tonight's the Night. Neil Young FAQ author Glen Boyd stated that it's "really cool to finally hear Whitten's "(Come On Baby Let's Go) Downtown" in its proper context. Spin called the song "a jaunty showcase number about scoring dope" and said of Whitten's performance in this context that it's "sorta chilling in retrospect."

Young and Crazy Horse performed "Come On Baby Let's Go Downtown" live on their Rust Never Sleeps tour, with Young taking the lead vocals.

== Cover versions ==
Phish guitarist Trey Anastasio played "Come On Baby Let's Go Downtown" at a live solo concert on February 15, 1999. Phish began playing it live in concert at a show on September 23, 2000, in Rosemont, Illinois, the same city where Anastasio had seen Young perform live a year earlier and stated that the show was one of the best experiences of his life.
