= Tired Eyes =

Song by Neil Young and The Santa Monica Flyers

from the album Tonight's the Night
- Released: June 20, 1975
- Recorded: August 26, 1973
- Studio: Studio Instrument Rentals, Hollywood, CA
- Genre: Rock
- Length: 4:35
- Label: Reprise
- Songwriter: Neil Young
- Producers: David Briggs; Neil Young

"Tired Eyes" is a song written by Neil Young that was first released on his 1975 album Tonight's the Night.

== Recording ==
"Tired Eyes" was recorded at Studio Instrument Rentals in Los Angeles on August 26, 1973. It was recorded on the same day as four other songs from Tonight's the Night: "Tonight's the Night," "World on a String," "Mellow My Mind" and "Speakin' Out." Young was backed by drummer Ralph Molina and bassist Billy Talbot from what was left of his frequent backing band Crazy Horse after the drug overdose death of guitarist Danny Whitten, as well as Nils Lofgren on piano and Ben Keith on pedal steel. Young plays electric guitar. Young dubbed the band The Santa Monica Flyers for this album.

== Lyrics and music ==
The lyrics of "Tired Eyes" describe a cocaine deal that went bad, resulting in the death of four men. It is based on a true story that occurred in Topanga Canyon in 1972. According to Young, "That actually happened to a friend of mine. My friend was the one who shot the other guys. It was just one of those deals that went bad." According to Rolling Stone critic Dave Marsh (referencing fellow critic Bud Scoppa) pointed out that the plot of "Tired Eyes" is similar to that of Robert Stone's 1974 novel Dog Soldiers, which was published after "Tired Eyes" was recorded but before it was released. Allmusic critic Bill Janovitz claims that the opening lines of "Well he shot four men in a cocaine deal/And he left them lying in an open field/Full of old cars with bullet holes in their mirrors/He tried to do his best, but he could not" could describe a scene from a Sam Peckinpah film. At one point Young seems to be having a conversation with himself, with the lyrics "Well tell me more/I mean was he a heavy doper or was he just a loser."

Young speaks the verses over the instrumentation, in a manner that music lecturer Ken Bielen compares to Frank Zappa, and sings the refrain in what the Rolling Stone editors describe as a mumble. Rolling Stone says that Young "mumbles the chorus - "Please take my advice/Open up your tired eyes" - over and over, as if he's trying to wake himself up from a nightmare. Music critic Nigel Williamson said that Young's vocal "has a world weary lethargy so that the song is drained of tension and drama" but that "paradoxically, this only adds to its impact." Janovitz compares Young's vocal performance to Lou Reed, saying that he speaks the verses using a "straightforward" voice "with Reed-like dryness" and he sings the refrain "in an even more raw, wary voice."

According to Williamson, "Tired Eyes" and the previous song "Lookout Joe" widen the theme of the Tonight's the Night from the deaths of Whitten and Bruce Berry, who are memorialized in other songs on the album, to turn the album into "an epitaph for an America that has lost its moral compass and for its dead in the jungles of Vietnam as well as in the back streets and barrios of urban America." Music critic Johnny Rogan similarly states that with this song Young "extends the [album's] narrative beyond the deaths of Whitten and Berry." Uncut contributor Jon Dale says that "Young has moved us out of the immediate hell of his personal life and into the wider, less concrete hells of a community licking its wounds post-Altamont, not bothering to figure out why it all went wrong." In a related vein, music journalist David Downing regards "Tired Eyes" and "Lookout Joe" as an attempt to look outward after the "self-laceration" of the earlier songs on the album, but says that the relief is only temporary, as he regards the line "He tried to do his best, but he could not" as standing as "a requiem for Danny, for Bruce, for friends and colleagues, for all who let them die, for the whole goddam circus."

== Reception ==
In 2004 Rolling Stone rated "Tired Eyes" as Young's 18th greatest song. Rolling Stone critic Dave Marsh regarded it among Young's best songs since After the Gold Rush. Marsh said:

The whole [Tonight's the Night] album has pointed to ["Tired Eyes"], song after song building the tightness with the endless repetition of phrases—musical and lyric—until the rasp of the guitars on the rockers and the sweetness of the singing on the weepers begins to grate, aching for release. Young's whole career may have been spent in pursuit of this story—remember the sinister black limousines lurking in the shadows of "Mr. Soul" and "Broken Arrow"?—but it is only now that he has found a way to tell the tale so directly.

According to Neil Young FAQ author Glen Boyd, "Tired Eyes" "plays more like a long conversation Young is having with himself about the event" and Young "keeps it real" on what Boyd considers one of the "very best tracks" on the album.

Janovitz interprets "Tired Eyes" as reflecting Young's "disgust and wariness" at the dark side of the Woodstock dream, such as the drugs and violence that manifested themselves at the Altamont Free Concert in 1969.

Producer David Briggs claimed that "Tired Eyes" was the best song on Tonight's the Night, saying that "you'll never hear a song like it. The dreamy recitation, the lyrics are so abstract—Neil really caught dope murder, that kind of feel."

"Tired Eyes" has appeared on the 1977 compilation album Decade and on the 2020 box set Neil Young Archives Volume II: 1972–1976.

== Personnel ==
- Neil Young – guitar, harmonica, vocals
- Ben Keith – pedal steel guitar, vocals
- Nils Lofgren – piano, vocals
- Billy Talbot – bass
- Ralph Molina – drums, vocals
