= Tonight's the Night (Neil Young song) =

Song by Neil Young and The Santa Monica Flyers

from the album Tonight's the Night
- Released: June 20, 1975
- Recorded: August 26, 1973 (version 1); September 13, 1973 (version 2)
- Studio: Studio Instrument Rentals, Hollywood, CA
- Genre: Rock
- Length: 4:40 (version 1); 4:51 (version 2)
- Label: Reprise
- Songwriter: Neil Young
- Producers: David Briggs; Neil Young

"Tonight's the Night" is a song written by Neil Young that was first released on his 1975 album Tonight's the Night. Two versions of the song bookended the album, with one version as the first song, and the other as the last. "Tonight's the Night" has also appeared on some of Young's live and compilation albums.

== Lyrics and music ==
"Tonight's the Night" was inspired by the death from a heroin overdose of Young's roadie Bruce Berry. The song begins with Young singing the line "tonight's the night" eight times in a voice that music critic Nigel Williamson describes as sounding "fragile, vulnerable and close to panic." At this point Young is accompanied by only guitar, bass, and piano. Then Young sings that "Bruce Berry was a working man/He used to load that Econoline van." Young goes on to describe how Berry's passion for life was wrecked by his drug addiction. The lyrics relate how late at night Berry used to play Young's guitar and sing in "a shaky voice that was real as the day was long." Young also relates how it gave him a chill when he heard that Berry had "died out on the mainline." The song ends with more repeats of the title phrase over limited instrumentation before the song closes with some spare guitar chords.

Allmusic critic Matthew Greenwald described the version of "Tonight's the Night" that opens the Tonight's the Night album as a "loose, funky song that has a strong, under-rehearsed barroom feel." He describes the version that closes the album as being faster and heavier, "while retaining the song's dark, almost scary appeal." Music critic Johnny Rogan described the closing version as being "chunkier" than the version that begins the album. The editors of Rolling Stone described Young and the band as being in "rough shape – drunk, off-key, enraged, wracked by grief and tequila."

Young biographer Jimmy McDonough claims that "you could write a book on the bit of piano" that begins the first version of the song. McDonough describes it as "just an offhand uncertain tinkling of the ivories, but so ominous, so full of dread," saying that "it sets the tome for the onslaught to come [on the album]—out-of-tune singing, bum notes, mike hits, and some of the best, most beautiful music ever."

== Writing and recording ==
Young claims that he wrote "Tonight's the Night" in his head without a guitar, and that he just heard the bass line.

The version of "Tonight's the Night" that opens the album was recorded at Studio Instrument Rentals in Los Angeles on August 26, 1973. It was recorded on the same day as four other songs from Tonight's the Night: "Tired Eyes," "World on a String," "Mellow My Mind" and "Speakin' Out." Young was backed by drummer Ralph Molina and bassist Billy Talbot from what was left of his frequent backing band Crazy Horse after the drug overdose death of guitarist Danny Whitten, whose death was also commemorated on Tonight's the Night, as well as Nils Lofgren on guitar and Ben Keith on slide guitar. Young dubbed the band The Santa Monica Flyers for this album. Young played piano on "Tonight's the Night." Young described the sessions as a "wake" for Berry and Whitten, saying that "We played Bruce and Danny on their way all through the night...it was spooky."

The version of the song that ends the album was recorded a few nights later.

== Reception ==
In 2004 Rolling Stone rated "Tonight's the Night" as Young's 5th greatest song. Rogan says that "you can sense the drama as [Young] builds up to the close of the first verse when he remembers picking up the phone to learn of his friends' drug related death." In a contemporary review, Rolling Stone critic Dave Marsh said that Young "shouts, threats, begs, moans and curses, telling the story of roadie Bruce Berry, who ODed 'out on the mainline.'" Marsh continued saying that "sometimes it feels as though Young is still absorbing the shock of his friend's death, sometimes as though he is railing against mortality itself, sometimes as though he's accepted it" but said it never sounds as if Young believes that Berry is dead."

Uncut contributor Jon Dale commented on "the 'crude coherence' of the playing, the way everyone falls in and out of place at the most apposite times, the cracks in Young's voice marshaled for poignancy, for amplification of the loose narrative arc.

Neil Young FAQ author Glen Boyd says that the second version of the song Young "pushes the emotional intensity" even more than in the first version. He says that "with a vocal that plays more like an anguished howl, he sounds like he is within seconds of becoming completely emotionally unglued," adding that it is one of the most brutally honest soul-baring in rock 'n' roll.

== Other appearances ==
The first version of "Tonight's the Night" was included on Young's 1977 compilation album Decade. Both versions were included on the box set Neil Young Archives Volume II: 1972–1976, released in 2020.

In live concerts in 1973 Young would play two or even three versions of "Tonight's the Night." On that tour he typically played mostly songs from the Tonight's the Night album that the audience had never heard. Before playing the second version, he would tease the audience by telling them that he was about to play a song that they heard before, and it would possibly go on for up to 30 minutes.

A later live version closed out Young's 1979 live album Live Rust. Music lecturer Ken Bielen says that the Young and the band "grieve over a driving bass line" and end the song by chanting the title a capella before the bass drum and full band rejoin. Rolling Stone said that this version became an "unlikely stadium-shaking rock anthem...where you can hear the fans whoop, cheer and whistle along with a funeral dirge."

Another live version was also released on Young's 1991 live album Weld, during which Young screams "Go, Bruce, play that guitar." Yet another live version appears on the 2000 album Road Rock Vol. 1.

== Personnel ==
- Neil Young – piano, vocals
- Ben Keith – pedal steel guitar (Part I), slide guitar (Part II), vocals
- Nils Lofgren – guitar
- Billy Talbot – bass
- Ralph Molina – drums, vocals
