= Bruce Berry (roadie) =

American roadie

- Born: Bruce Anthony Berry; August 3, 1950; Los Angeles, California, United States
- Died: June 4, 1973 (aged 22); Los Angeles, California, United States
- Occupation: Roadie
- Employer: Crosby, Stills, Nash & Young

Bruce Anthony Berry (August 3, 1950 – June 4, 1973) was a professional roadie for the members of Crosby, Stills, Nash & Young, both as a group and individually.

His brother was Jan Berry of the musical duo Jan and Dean. His father William Berry was an aeronautical engineer, who worked with Howard Hughes on the Spruce Goose.

He got his start by working at his brother Ken's store Studio Instrument Rentals (S.I.R.) which brought him steady gigs. His happy, charismatic personality endeared him to the group and he was often on the road with them. He used to load all of his instruments into his trademark white Ford Econoline van, until he moved to England to work with Stephen Stills.

When he returned to the United States, he was a completely different person. Danny Whitten of Crazy Horse had introduced him to heroin and it took over his life. Berry died of an overdose of heroin and cocaine on June 4, 1973, just a few months after Whitten had died from an overdose of sedatives and alcohol. Berry's story was used as the theme of an unrealized Broadway play Young developed titled From Roadie to Riches, and for lyrics of the title track from Tonight's the Night by Neil Young. Additional album tracks "Lookout Joe," "Borrowed Tune," and "Come on Baby Let's Go Downtown" also had their origin as soundtrack cuts for the musical.
