= Live at the Fillmore East (Neil Young and Crazy Horse album) =

Live album by Neil Young and Crazy Horse
- Released: November 14, 2006
- Recorded: March 6 – 7, 1970
- Venues: Fillmore East, New York City
- Genres: Garage rock; hard rock; folk rock
- Length: 43:15
- Label: Reprise
- Producer: Paul Rothchild

Neil Young chronology
Living with War (2006)	Live at the Fillmore East (2006)	Living with War: In the Beginning (2006)

Crazy Horse chronology
Scratchy: The Complete Reprise Recordings (2005)	Live at the Fillmore East (2006)	Americana (2012)

Archives Performance Series chronology
PS01: Live at the Riverboat 1969 (2009)	PS02: Live at the Fillmore East (2006)	PS02.5: Live at the Cellar Door (2013)

Professional ratings
Review scores
Source	Rating
AllMusic	4.5/5 stars
Okayplayer	3.5/5 stars
Pitchfork	(8.2/10)
Rolling Stone	4/5 stars

Live at the Fillmore East is a live album by Neil Young and Crazy Horse featuring guitarist Danny Whitten, released in 2006. It also has the distinction of being the first album released as part of the Neil Young Archives series of archival recordings.

== Overview ==
In February and March 1970, Young and Crazy Horse went on tour to support Everybody Knows This Is Nowhere (1969). Live at the Fillmore East features performances from the tour. The tour was the last Neil Young and Crazy Horse tour to feature Whitten.

Young played four shows at the Fillmore East on March 6 and 7, each show consisting of a solo acoustic set and an electric set with Crazy Horse. This release contains each song performed during the electric set, minus "Cinnamon Girl" (which was eventually released as a BD-Live download as part of The Archives Vol. 1 1963–1972 box set). It was released on CD and DVD. The DVD features pictures from the show, pictures of the original handwritten lyrics and reviews from the era, as well as improved sound (24bit/96 kHz PCM audio) over the CD release.

The album is the first live release featuring Danny Whitten, who died in 1972. It also features Jack Nitzsche as an official member of the band, as indicated by Young in the band introductions; this four-man line-up of Crazy Horse backed Young for a short American tour in February and March 1970. "Come On Baby Let's Go Downtown" was previously released on Young's 1975 album Tonight's the Night, which explores Young's grief at the loss of friends to drugs. In that release, the second line of each chorus was edited out, presumably to tighten up the arrangement; the present release is an unedited performance. When Young resurrected live performances of the song after this release, the lines edited out were restored. A studio version of this song appears on the album Crazy Horse. While the song is credited to Young and Whitten both on that album and on Tonight's the Night, here "Downtown" is credited to Whitten alone. (At the very end of the final track, "Cowgirl in the Sand", one can hear the studio version of James Taylor's "Sweet Baby James" being played.)

The release features two other songs from the era that wouldn't see the light of day until years after the concert. "Winterlong" was first released on the 1977 compilation Decade and "Wonderin'" would feature on the 1983 rockabilly album Everybody's Rockin', complete with doo-wop backing vocals.

It is the first release related to the Archives series, but labeled the second. (However, two earlier concerts have since been released, Sugar Mountain - Live at Canterbury House 1968 which was released on November 25, 2008 and Live at the Riverboat 1969, from a 1969 Young residency at the Toronto coffee house of the same name, which was released on June 2, 2009.)

The release is a departure of format from what fans had expected. In previous interviews, Young had expressed interest in releasing a series of multi-disc box sets of unreleased material and performances, long referred to as the "Archives". Later, another installment, Live at Massey Hall 1971 was released and fared better on the charts. The release date of the first of the box sets Young discussed, The Archives Vol. 1 1963-1972, was announced in March 2007 for release in September or October of that year. Soon after those months passed without the box set, a new release date was announced - February 2008 - which also passed without further Archive releases. Finally on June 2, 2009, the Archives were released with Live at Fillmore East comprising disc 5 of the 8-disc CD release.

The album debuted on the Billboard 200 album chart at number 55 on December 2, 2006, with sales of 20,000 copies. It spent three weeks on the chart.

There is also a 200-gram vinyl LP pressing by Classic Records. Though originally planned to include a bonus performance of "Cinnamon Girl" as a bonus track, the final product has the same track listing as the CD and DVD. "Cinnamon Girl" is separately available online.

The support act for this performance was Miles Davis performing with an electric sextet. Davis' performance has also been released as the live album Live at the Fillmore East, March 7, 1970: It's About that Time.

== Track listing ==
All tracks written by Neil Young except as indicated.

No.	Title	Writer(s)	Length
1.	"Everybody Knows This Is Nowhere"		3:36
2.	"Winterlong"		3:40
3.	"Down By The River"		12:24
4.	"Wonderin'"		3:35
5.	"Come On Baby Let's Go Downtown"	Danny Whitten, Neil Young	3:51
6.	"Cowgirl In The Sand"		16:09

== Personnel ==
- Neil Young – guitar, vocals, mixing

Crazy Horse

- Danny Whitten – guitar, vocals
- Billy Talbot – bass
- Ralph Molina – drums, backing vocals
- Jack Nitzsche – electric piano

Additional roles

- Paul Rothchild – production
- Peter K. Siegel – engineering, mixing ("Cowgirl in the Sand")
- John Nowland – analog to digital transferring, mixing
- Tim Mulligan – mastering
- John Hausmann – assistant engineering

DVD production

- Bernard Shakey (Neil Young) – direction
- L.A. Johnson – production
- Elliot Rabinowitz – executive production
- Will Mitchell – assiocate production
- Benjamin Johnson – photography direction
- Toshi Onuki – editing, art direction
- Joel Bernstein – archiving, photography
- Paul Supplee – production coordination
- Steven Gregory – main title design
- Rich Winter – authoring
- Ziemowit Darski, Beca Lafore, John Fadeff, Megan McKenna – graphics production
- Topher White – assistant production
- Amalie R. Rothschild, Joe Sia, Al Kramer – photography
- Jack Weston – Fillmore East memorabilia

== Charts ==
Chart (2006)	Peak position
Belgian Albums (Ultratop Flanders)	71
Dutch Albums (Album Top 100)	64
German Albums (Offizielle Top 100)	81
Italian Albums (FIMI)	74
Swedish Albums (Sverigetopplistan)	32
UK Albums (Official Charts)	88
US Billboard 200	55
US Top Rock Albums (Billboard)	18
US Indie Store Album Sales (Billboard)	4
