= David Downing =

British author

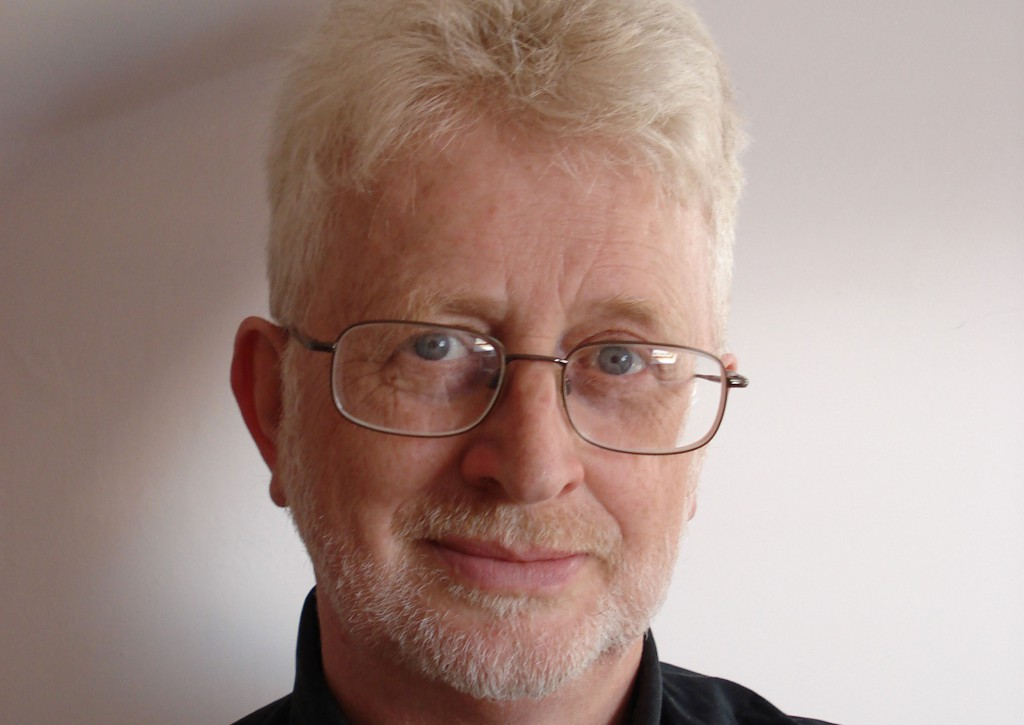
- Born: 9 August 1946 (age 80); London, England
- Occupation: Novelist
- Writing career
- Genres: Non-fiction, fiction, crime, mystery

David Downing (born 1946) is a British author of mystery novels and nonfiction. His works have been reviewed by Publishers Weekly, The New York Times, and The Wall Street Journal. He is known for his convincing depictions of World War II and Berlin. He has written a series of espionage thrillers, based around Anglo-American character John Russell exploring Germany in the 1940s. They are known as "The Station Series" because they are all named after train stations, mostly in Berlin.

== Life ==
Downing grew up in Harrow, London. He gained a BA in Afro-Asian Studies and an MA in International Relations from the University of Sussex. In 1974 he travelled overland to India via Iran and Afghanistan. He visited the Soviet Union three times. In the late 1980s and early 1990s he was involved in the creation of an environmental centre in north-east London, and visited South and Central America. From 1993 he lived in Boston, Massachusetts with his future wife Nancy. Since 1998 they have lived in Guildford.

== Writing ==
Between 1973 and 1976, Downing contributed to the music magazine Let It Rock and freelanced for other rock magazines. His first book, Future Rock, was published in 1975. This is a study of utopian and science fiction explorations of the future in music, analysing the work of Bob Dylan, David Bowie, Pink Floyd and others.

Jack of Spies, the first novel in a new series set before, during and after World War I, was published in September 2013.

His contributions to the studies of World War II history have appeared in nonfiction books and thrillers. His studies mainly examine the events that decided "the fate of Germany and Japan" toward the end of the war. He wrote a counterfactual history of the Second World War, The Moscow Option. He wrote An Atlas of Territorial and Border Disputes (1980, New English Library, ISBN 0-450-04804-7).

Under the name David Monnery he has written novels about the Special Air Service and Special Boat Service.

He has also written books about football, history books for children, and a biography of Neil Young.

== Publications ==
=== John Russell series ===
- Zoo Station (2007) ISBN 978-1-56947-971-1
- Silesian Station (2008) ISBN 978-1-56947-573-7
- Stettin Station (2009) ISBN 978-1-56947-919-3
- Potsdam Station (2010) ISBN 1-56947-917-8
- Lehrter Station (2012) ISBN 978-1-61695-074-3
- Masaryk Station (2013) ISBN 978-1616952235
- Wedding Station (2021) ISBN 978-1641291088
- Union Station (2024) ISBN 978-1641293570

=== Jack McColl series ===
- Jack of Spies (2013) ISBN 978-1-61695-268-6
- One Man's Flag (2015) ISBN 978-1-61695-270-9
- Lenin's Roller Coaster (2017) ISBN 978-1-61695-604-2
- The Dark Clouds Shining (2018) ISBN 978-1-61695-606-6

=== Other novels ===
- The Moscow Option (1980) ISBN 978-185367-463-1
- Russian Revolution (1985) ISBN 978-0-45006-002-1
- The Red Eagles (1987) ISBN 978-1-61695-599-1
- Diary of a Dead Man on Leave (2019) ISBN 978-1-61695-843-5

=== As David Monnery ===
==== Special Boat Service ====
- Monnery, David (1995). Marine C: The Florida Run. ISBN 9781898125396.
- Monnery, David (1996). Marine G: China Seas. ISBN 1898125635.
- Monnery, David (1996). Marine I: Escape from Azerbaijan. 22 Books. ISBN 978-1-898125-83-9.

==== Special Air Service ====
- Gambian Bluff
- Guatemala - Journey into Evil
- For King and Country
- Zulu Four
- Mission to Argentina
- Bosnian Inferno
- Samarkand Hijack
- Colombian Cocaine War
- Days of the Dead

=== Nonfiction books ===
- Future Rock (1976) ISBN 978-0-586-04308-0
- Clint Eastwood—All-American Anti-Hero (1978, with Gary Herman) ISBN 0-86001-412-6
- Jane Fonda—All-American Anti-Heroine (1980, with Gary Herman) ISBN 0-86001-644-7
- A Dreamer Of Pictures: Neil Young: The Man And His Music (1994) ISBN 0747518815
- Sealing Their Fate: The Twenty-two Days that Decided World War II, (2009) ISBN 0-306-81620-2
