= Tonight's the Night (Neil Young album) =

1975 studio album by Neil Young

Studio album by Neil Young
- Released: June 20, 1975
- Recorded: August – September 1973 (Note: except: "Downtown" on March 7, 1970; "Lookout Joe" on December 15, 1972; and "Borrowed Tune" on December 5, 1973)
- Studios: Studio Instrument Rentals, Hollywood, California (Note: except: "Downtown", live at the Fillmore East; "Lookout Joe", Broken Arrow Ranch; "Borrowed Tune": Broken Arrow Ranch)
- Genres: Country rock; blues rock
- Length: 44:52
- Label: Reprise
- Producers: David Briggs and Neil Young with Tim Mulligan; Elliot Mazer (on "Lookout Joe")

Neil Young chronology
On the Beach (1974)	Tonight's the Night (1975)	Zuma (1975)

Tonight's the Night is the sixth studio album by Canadian-American songwriter Neil Young. It was recorded in August–September 1973, mostly on August 26, but its release was delayed until June 1975. It peaked at No. 25 on the Billboard 200. The album is the third and final of the so-called "Ditch Trilogy" of albums that Young released following the major success of 1972's Harvest, whereupon the scope of his success and acclaim became so difficult for Young to handle that he subsequently experienced alienation from his music and career.

In 2003, the album was ranked number 331 on Rolling Stone's list of the 500 Greatest Albums of All Time, moving up to number 330 in the list's 2012 edition and climbing further to number 302 in the 2020 update.

== Background ==
Tonight's the Night is a direct expression of grief. Crazy Horse guitarist Danny Whitten and Young's friend and roadie Bruce Berry had both died of drug overdoses in the months before the songs were written. Bruce Berry was the brother of both Jan Berry of Jan and Dean fame and of Ken Berry, owner of S.I.R. studios where the album was recorded. Berry leveraged his music industry connections to work as a roadie for both Young and Stephen Stills during his Manassas tour. Berry died of a heroin overdose in June 1973. Danny Whitten was a singer, songwriter and guitarist in the band Crazy Horse, with whom Young had recorded two albums. He died in November 1972 the night after Young fired him during rehearsals for the Time Fades Away tour due to his inability to play. The sessions were the first time the remaining members of Crazy Horse had played together since the passing of Whitten. In 1975, Young explained to Bud Scoppa of Creem magazine how the loss was both personal and professional:

"At S.I.R. we were playing, and these two cats who had been a close part of our unit – of our force and our energy – were both gone to junk. Both of them O.D.'d, and we're playing in a place where we're getting together to make up for what is gone and try to make ourselves stronger and continue. Because we thought we had it with Danny Whitten – at least I did. I thought that I had a combination of people that could be as effective as groups like the Rolling Stones had been. Just for rhythm, which I'm really into. I haven't had that rhythm for a while and that's why I haven't been playing my guitar; because without that behind me I won't play. I mean you can't get free enough. So I've had to play the rhythm myself ever since Danny died".

Tonight's the Night was not the first of Young's work to concern the dangers of heroin and the toll it had taken on the musicians around him. "The Needle and the Damage Done" from the album Harvest addresses the topic directly, and was partly inspired by Whitten's struggles. The song was also inspired by several other artists Young had seen fall to heroin, as he explained to a January 1971 audience: "I got to see to see a lot of great musicians before they happened. Before they became famous. When they were just gigging. Five and six sets a night. Things like that. I got to see a lot of great musicians who nobody got to see for one reason or another. But strangely enough the real good ones that you never got to see was because of heroin. And that started happening over and over. And then it happened to some that everybody knew about."

The title track "Tonight's the Night" mentions Berry by name, while Whitten's guitar and vocal work highlight "Come on Baby Let's Go Downtown", taken from a March 1970 Crazy Horse concert at the Fillmore East. The song later appeared, unedited, on a live album from the same concerts, Live at the Fillmore East, with Whitten credited as the sole author. Nils Lofgren's guitar parts on the album are intentionally played in a style reminiscent of how Whitten would play: "When I use Nils, like on Tonight's the Night I used him for piano, and I played piano on a couple of songs and he played guitar. In the songs where he plays guitar he's actually playing as Danny Whitten, the way Danny Whitten played guitar. The thing is, I'm talking about him and you can hear him. So Nils just fits in – he plays that hot rock & roll style guitar. He was really into it."

The band assembled for the album was known as the Santa Monica Flyers. It consisted of Young, Ben Keith, Nils Lofgren, and the Crazy Horse rhythm section of Billy Talbot and Ralph Molina. Young had previously recorded with Talbot and Molina on Everybody Knows This Is Nowhere, with Lofgren on After the Gold Rush and with Keith on Harvest. "Lookout Joe" dates from an earlier session with his band the Stray Gators, with whom he had recorded Harvest. "Borrowed Tune" was recorded solo at Young's ranch after the album's sessions.

== Writing ==
The title track "Tonight's the Night" was written in Young's head, "without a guitar: I just heard the bass line." Its lyrics starkly address Berry's death.

"Borrowed Tune" borrows its melody from "Lady Jane" by the Rolling Stones. In the liner notes to Decade, Young describes it as "A song I had written at the beginning of the Time Fades Away tour reflecting on whether a big stadium tour was right for me." Young explains the song's development to Rolling Stone in 1975: "I played 'Lady Jane' and forgot the chords. I started playing my own chords, it started sounding better to me, so I kept playing that. It just turned into another song."

"Come On Baby Let's Go Downtown", written and sung by Whitten, is about buying drugs.

"Mellow My Mind" is about being weary from a long tour and not being able to unwind. He tells an audience in 1976: "This is a song about being on the road. It's a song about wanting to stop after a long tour; just wanting to be able to slow down. Even though it's over you can't stop because you get going so fast from place to place. Then when it ends you keep on going for awhile. "Albuquerque" shares similar sentiments.

In "Roll Another Number (For the Road)", written during the recording sessions, Young mourns the end of the Woodstock era, and the loss of members of that movement to drugs.

"New Mama" was written for Young's partner Carrie Snodgress upon the birth of their son Zeke in September 1972. He explains in concert in January 1973: "This next tune is a tune I wrote a little while ago, just a while ago, about five months ago or something, when my old lady had a baby. I wrote this song. People always come up and say, 'Did you write a song about your kid yet? Hey, did you write a song about your kid?' And I say, 'No, not yet. Don't know if I'm gonna. Can't think of anything nice.' But I finally did it anyway. I kept thinking about that morning, you know, too much."

The lyrics to "Lookout Joe" are about a soldier returning home from the Vietnam War.

"Tired Eyes" was inspired by an April 1972 drug deal gone bad that ended in murder in Topanga Canyon, an artistic community in Southern California where Young once lived: "That actually happened to a friend of mine. It was just one of those deals that turned bad, he didn't have any choice really. The lyric is just a straight narrative account of what happened."

== Recording ==
In the summer of 1973, after the conclusion of the Time Fades Away tour, Young made another attempt to record with Crosby, Stills & Nash at his ranch, capturing the songs "See the Changes" and "Human Highway" with the group. As the sessions wound down, Young reached out to producer David Briggs, who had recorded Young's first three solo albums. Briggs remembers Young knocking on his door: "I opened it and there was Neil. He said, 'Hey, I was just on my way to a CSNY session and I just don't feel like going there. Let's go make some rock and roll.' So, we packed our bags and came to L.A. and wound up with the Tonight's the Night album." The album was recorded at S.I.R. Studios, or Studio Instrument Rentals, a Hollywood musical instrument rental business managed by Bruce Berry's brother, Ken. Young commandeered the facility's rehearsal space, knocked a hole through a wall to run cables and built a makeshift studio. "Briggs rented a lot of recording equipment from Wally Heider, including a sixteen-track tape machine, some outboard gear, microphones, and a tube recording console called the Green Board," Young explains in Special Deluxe. Drummer Ralph Molina remembers the setting in an April 2023 interview:

"We recorded Tonight’s The Night at Bruce’s brother’s rehearsal studio in Hollywood, the S.I.R. studio. We would shoot pool, and just walk around. The thing was, we all somehow got the mood at the same time, usually around midnight, and we all just walked to our instruments and began to play. The mood we had was light but at the same time dark, it was as one. The album with those great songs was magical. Neil, Billy, Ben, Nils and myself, were just one unit. The songs made it possible to play passionately."

Young explains further in an August 1975 interview with Cameron Crowe for Rolling Stone:

"Tonight's The Night is like an OD letter. The whole thing is about life, dope and death. When we played that music we were all thinking of Danny Whitten and Bruce Berry, two close members of our unit lost to junk overdoses. The Tonight's The Night sessions were the first time what was left of Crazy Horse had gotten together since Danny died. It was up to us to get the strength together among us to fill the hole he left. The other OD, Bruce Berry, was CSNY's roadie for a long time. His brother Ken runs Studio Instrument Rentals, where we recorded the album. So we had a lot of vibes going for us. There was a lot of spirit in the music we made. It's funny, I remember the whole experience in black and white. We'd go down to S.I.R. about 5:00 in the afternoon and start getting high, drinking tequila and playing pool. About midnight, we'd start playing. And we played Bruce and Danny on their way all through the night. I'm not a junkie and I won't even try it out to check out what it's like. But we all got high enough, right out there on the edge where we felt wide open to the whole mood. It was spooky. I probably feel this album more than anything else I've ever done."

Much of the album was recorded live in the studio and features a raw sound. Young's voice is sore on several tracks, and notably cracks during an emotional moment in "Mellow My Mind". Drummer Ralph Molina shares "I still get chills when it gets to that fuckin' note. It's so real. I'll tell ya, man, Neil was right there with us. He was wide open." Young discusses the album's sound in a 1975 NME interview: "Those mixes were a little unorthodox. Like it's real music. Sometimes I'd be on mic and sometimes I'd be two feet off it. Sometimes I'd be lookin' around the room and singin' back off mic … we'd have to bring it way back up in the mix to get it. And you can hear the echo in the room. We were all on stage at SIR just playing, with the PA system and everything, just like a live thing."

In addition to the album tracks, the group also attempted the older songs "Wonderin'", "Everybody's Alone" and "One More Sign" while at S.I.R. Joni Mitchell dropped by the sessions and sang her recent song "Raised on Robbery" with the group. In his memoir, Young describes the performance as "the most sexy and revealing version that song ever had. She still refuses to let me release it. I don't know what the hell she was thinking when she joined us and sang the song. It kicks ass. What the fuck was that about? It was funkier than anything she has ever cut. A total gem!" Outtakes from the sessions were made available in 2020 on Neil Young Archives Volume II: 1972–1976.

At the conclusion of the sessions, the group performed the new repertoire in a series of inaugural concerts at the newly opened Roxy Theatre. The shows were released in 2018 as Roxy: Tonight's the Night Live. The group also toured behind the material in North America and the United Kingdom.

== Early version ==
The album was recorded in August and September 1973, but not released until June 1975. The album was initially shelved. In interviews and on his website, Young has described an earlier, more somber version of Tonight's the Night. In a 1985 interview with Adam Sweeting of Melody Maker, Young explains that

"The original Tonight's The Night was much heavier than the one that hit the stands. The original one had only nine songs on it. It was the same takes, but the songs that were missing were Lookout Joe and Borrowed Tune, a couple of songs that I added. They fit lyrically but they softened the blow a little bit. What happened was the original had only nine songs but it had a lot of talking, a lot of mumbling and talking between the group and me, more disorganized and fucked-up sounding than the songs, but they were intros to the songs. Not counts but little discussions, three and four word conversations between songs, and it left it with a spooky feeling. It was like you didn't know if these guys were still gonna be alive in the morning, the way they were talking. More like a wake than anything else."

Neil Young's father, Scott Young, wrote of it in his memoir, Neil and Me:

Ten years after the original recording, David Briggs and I talked about Tonight's the Night, on which he had shared the producer credit with Neil. At home a couple of weeks earlier he had come across the original tape, the one that wasn't put out. "I want to tell you, it is a handful. It is unrelenting. There is no relief in it at all. It does not release you for one second. It's like some guy having you by the throat from the first note, and all the way to the end." After all the real smooth stuff Neil had been doing, David felt most critics and others simply failed to read what they should have into Tonight's the Night – that it was an artist making a giant growth step. Neil came in during this conversation, which was in his living room. When David stopped Neil said, "You've got that original? I thought it was lost. I've never been able to find it. We'll bring it out someday, that original."

Young described the experience of sharing the album for the first time with his record company in a November 1978 Tony Schwartz interview for Newsweek:

"When I handed it to Warner's, they hated it. We played it ten times as loud as they usually play things and it was awful. I mean, can you imagine listening to it at 1:00 in the afternoon in some corporate office? Well, I wasn't trying to make a masterpiece. I was trying to capture a moment. I didn't want to clean it up. I don't want the Carpenters to play Tonight's The Night. The album was recorded very high on tequila, and we did the same thing when we went out on the road with the "Tonight" tour. For me, it's very much like being an actor. I try to live the songs in my mind. Tonight's The Night was a story of death and dope. It was about a sleazy, burned-out rock star just about to go, about what fame and crowds do to you. I had to exorcise those feelings. I felt like it was the only chance I had to stay alive."

== Later sessions ==
Between the shelving of the album and its ultimate release, Young tinkered with the running order, re-recording some songs and adding new songs. In spring 1974, he made a new attempt at the title track in an upbeat, power trio version recorded with Ralph Molina and Greg Reeves of CSNY. He also recorded an acoustic version of "New Mama" and a banjo performance of "Mellow My Mind" at his ranch. Different running orders of the album were proposed, incorporating songs from the On the Beach sessions. An acetate of one such alternate version circulated as a bootleg and included the songs "Walk On", "For the Turnstiles", "Bad Fog of Loneliness", "Winterlong" and "Traces". The released album ultimately reflected the original concept and running order. Archivist Joel Bernstein explained in an August 1988 interview:

"There are a couple of Tonight's the Night acetates that have different running orders. There were many different versions of Tonight's the Night and the one that came out was actually one of the original ones. The sequence is a much earlier sequence. After that time he'd experiment with other songs like "Bad Fog of Loneliness". I think "Winterlong" was there too. Between 1972 and 1975 Neil had a lot of finished recorded songs that never made it on to an album, especially the 1974 period, the spring of 1974. Like "Barefoot Floors" for example."

== Release ==
After abandoning the album, in 1974, Young recorded and released On the Beach, went on tour with CSNY, and recorded the album Homegrown. At a listening party for the completed Homegrown, Young decided to change course, and elected to release Tonight's the Night instead. Young played the new album to a group of friends including members of the Band, and Tonight's the Night happened to be on the same reel. Young explains in Waging Heavy Peace: "Ben Keith and I played the tapes one midnight in what is now known as the Belushi bungalow of Hollywood's Chateau Marmont for Rick Danko of the Band and some other musicians. Rick said after hearing Homegrown and then Tonight's the Night, "You ought to put THAT out! What the hell is THAT?" So we did. It was Rick Danko who brought it back." Young further explains to Cameron Crowe:

"I had a playback party for Homegrown for me and about ten friends. We were out of our minds. We all listened to the album and Tonight's The Night happened to be on the same reel. So we listened to that too, just for laughs. No comparison. I know the first time I listened back on Tonight's The Night it was the most out-of-tune thing I'd ever heard. Everybody's off-key. I couldn't hack it. But by listening to those two albums back to back at the party, I started to see the weaknesses in Homegrown. I took Tonight's The Night because of its overall strength in performance and feeling. The theme may be a little depressing, but the general feeling is much more elevating than Homegrown."

The released album largely matches the original running order, but without the dialogue between the songs, and with an additional three tracks. Young explains to Bud Scuppa: "Tonight's the Night didn't come out right after it was recorded because it wasn't finished. It just wasn't in the right space, it wasn't in the right order, the concept wasn't right. I had to get the color right, so it was not so down that it would make people restless. I had to keep jolting every once in a while to get people to wake up so they could be lulled again." Young told Cameron Crowe how the final running order was selected:

"I only had nine songs, so I set the whole thing aside and did On The Beach instead. It took Elliot to finish Tonight's The Night. You see, a while back there were some people who were gonna make a Broadway show out of the story of Bruce Berry and everything. They even had a script written. We were putting together a tape for them and in the process of listening back on the old tracks, Elliot found three even older songs that related to the trip, "Lookout Joe," "Borrowed Tune" and "Come on Baby Let's Go Downtown," a live track from when I played the Fillmore East with Crazy Horse. Danny even sings lead on that one. Elliot added those songs to the original nine and sequenced them all into a cohesive story."

The decision to release the album in 1975 presented considerable career risk. In a 1987 interview with Dave Fanning, Young recalls:

"I remember when I handed in the album, the President of Reprise Records, they were supportive no matter whether they liked it or understood it, but on this record they came back and said, 'Well, Neil, if you want to put it out you can put it out. You know you had Harvest then you put out On the Beach and it was kind of off the wall, you didn't sell that many. Time Fades Away, we didn't do very well with that. We think that if you put this album out it could be the end of your career.' So I said, 'Well, we better put this out right away then, because I think it's good."

== Liner notes ==
Included with the early original vinyl releases of Tonight's the Night is a cryptic message written by Young: "I'm sorry. You don't know these people. This means nothing to you."

On the front of the insert is a letter to a character called "Waterface"; scratched into the run-out grooves on side one is the message "Hello Waterface" while the run-out grooves on side two read "Goodbye Waterface". No explanation is given to this person's identity. In Jimmy McDonough's Shakey, Young says that "Waterface is the person writing the letter. When I read the letter, I'm Waterface. It's just a stupid thing—a suicide note without the suicide." The picture of Roy Orbison in the insert is taken from a bootleg tape Young came across and, feeling bad that Orbison most likely did not know the bootleg existed, printed it in the insert for him to see.

The back of the insert has some text superimposed over the credits to Young's On the Beach album, released a year earlier. This text is reportedly the lyrics to a Homegrown-era unreleased song titled "Florida", characterized by McDonough as "a cockamamie spoken-word dream, set to the shrieking accompaniment of either Young or [Ben] Keith drawing a wet finger around the rim of a glass."

When unfolded, a whole side of the insert features a lengthy article printed entirely in Dutch. It is a review of a Tonight's the Night live show by Dutch journalist Constant Meijers for the Dutch rock music magazine Muziekkrant OOR. In 1976 Young said he chose to print it "Because I didn't understand any of it myself, and when someone is so sickened and fucked up as I was then, everything's in Dutch anyway." Meijers later spent a week at Young's ranch in California: during this visit, Young explained that he chose the article after some Dutch girls who were visiting him translated the story and made him aware of the fact "that someone on the other end of the world exactly understood what he was trying to say."

The Reprise Records label on the vinyl copy was printed in black and white rather than the standard orange color, a process Young undertook again on the CD label art for 1994's Sleeps with Angels. Early editions of the sleeve were made on blotter paper.

In Shakey, Young maintains that along with the inserts there was a small package of glitter inside the sleeve that was meant to fall out ("our Bowie statement"), spilling when the listener took the record out. However, neither McDonough nor Young archivist Joel Bernstein have yet found a copy of Tonight's the Night featuring the glitter package.

== Critical reception ==
Professional ratings
Review scores
Source	Rating
AllMusic	5/5 stars
Christgau's Record Guide	A
Pitchfork	10/10
Rolling Stone	5/5 stars
Rolling Stone Album Guide	5/5 stars

Dave Marsh wrote in the original Rolling Stone review:

The music has a feeling of offhand, first-take crudity matched recently only by Blood on the Tracks, almost as though Young wanted us to miss its ultimate majesty in order to emphasize its ragged edge of desolation. [...] More than any of Young's earlier songs and albums—even the despondent On the Beach and the mordant, rancorous Time Fades Away—Tonight's the Night is preoccupied with death and disaster. [...] There is no sense of retreat, no apology, no excuses offered and no quarter given. If anything, these are the old ideas with a new sense of aggressiveness. The jitteriness of the music, its sloppy, unarranged (but decidedly structured) feeling is clearly calculated.

In a follow-up review published in the 1983 edition of The New Rolling Stone Record Guide, Marsh writes:

The record chronicles the post-hippie, post-Vietnam demise of counterculture idealism, and a generation's long, slow trickle down the drain through drugs, violence, and twisted sexuality. This is Young's only conceptually cohesive record, and it's a great one.

Chris Fallon of PopMatters said, "Tonight's the Night is that one rare record I will never tire of."

== Track listing ==
All tracks written by Neil Young, except "Come on Baby Let's Go Downtown" written with Danny Whitten.

=== Side one ===
1. "Tonight's the Night" (4:39)
  - Neil Young – piano, vocal; Nils Lofgren – guitar; Ben Keith – pedal steel guitar, vocal; Billy Talbot – bass; Ralph Molina – drums, vocal
  - Recorded at S.I.R., Hollywood, 8/26/1973. Produced by David Briggs & Neil Young.
2. "Speakin' Out" (4:56)
  - Neil Young – piano, vocal; Nils Lofgren – guitar; Ben Keith – pedal steel guitar, vocal; Billy Talbot – bass; Ralph Molina – drums
  - Recorded at S.I.R., Hollywood, 8/26/1973. Produced by David Briggs & Neil Young.
3. "World on a String" (2:27)
  - Neil Young – guitar, harmonica, vocal; Nils Lofgren – piano; Ben Keith – pedal steel guitar; Billy Talbot – bass; Ralph Molina – drums, vocal
  - Recorded at S.I.R., Hollywood, 8/26/1973. Produced by David Briggs & Neil Young.
4. "Borrowed Tune" (3:26)
  - Neil Young – piano, harmonica, vocal. The lyrics, by Young, are set to the melody of "Lady Jane" by Mick Jagger/Keith Richards. Both the title and lyrics ("I'm singing this borrowed tune / I took from the Rolling Stones") note the song's origin.
  - Recorded at Studio, Broken Arrow Ranch, 12/5/1973. Produced by Neil Young.
5. "Come On Baby Let's Go Downtown" (3:35)
  - Neil Young – guitar, vocal; Danny Whitten – guitar, vocal; Jack Nitzsche – piano; Billy Talbot – bass; Ralph Molina – drums, vocal
  - Recorded at Fillmore East, New York City, 3/7/1970. Produced by David Briggs & Neil Young.
6. "Mellow My Mind" (3:07)
  - Neil Young – guitar, harmonica, vocal; Nils Lofgren – piano; Ben Keith – pedal steel guitar; Billy Talbot – bass; Ralph Molina – drums
  - Recorded at S.I.R., Hollywood, 8/26/1973. Produced by David Briggs & Neil Young.

=== Side two ===
1. "Roll Another Number (For the Road)" (3:02)
  - Neil Young – guitar, vocal; Nils Lofgren – piano, vocal; Ben Keith – pedal steel guitar, vocal; Billy Talbot – bass; Ralph Molina – drums, vocal
  - Recorded at S.I.R., Hollywood, 9/9/1973. Produced by David Briggs & Neil Young.
2. "Albuquerque" (4:02)
  - Neil Young – guitar, vocal; Nils Lofgren – piano, vocal; Ben Keith – pedal steel guitar, vocal; Billy Talbot – bass; Ralph Molina – drums, vocal
  - Recorded at S.I.R., Hollywood, 9/13/1973. Produced by David Briggs & Neil Young.
3. "New Mama" (2:11)
  - Neil Young – guitar, vocal, vibes; Nils Lofgren - piano; Ben Keith – vocal; Ralph Molina – vocal; George Whitsell – vocal
  - Recorded at S.I.R., Hollywood, 9/10/1973. Produced by David Briggs & Neil Young.
4. "Lookout Joe" (3:57)
  - Neil Young – guitar, vocal; Ben Keith – slide guitar, vocal; Tim Drummond – bass; Jack Nitzsche – piano; Kenny Buttrey – drums
  - Recorded at Studio, Broken Arrow Ranch, 12/15/1972. Produced by Elliot Mazer and Neil Young
5. "Tired Eyes" (4:38)
  - Neil Young – guitar, harmonica, vocal; Nils Lofgren – piano, vocal; Ben Keith – pedal steel guitar, vocal; Billy Talbot – bass, vocal; Ralph Molina – drums, vocal
  - Recorded at S.I.R., Hollywood, 8/26/1973. Produced by David Briggs & Neil Young.
6. "Tonight's the Night – Part II" (4:52)
  - Neil Young – piano, vocal; Nils Lofgren – guitar; Ben Keith – pedal steel guitar, vocal; Billy Talbot – bass; Ralph Molina – drums, vocal
  - Recorded at S.I.R., Hollywood, 9/13/1973. Produced by David Briggs & Neil Young.

== Personnel ==
- Neil Young – vocals; guitar on "World on a String", "Come On Baby Let's Go Downtown", "Mellow My Mind", "Roll Another Number", "Albuquerque", "New Mama", "Lookout Joe", and "Tired Eyes"; piano on "Tonight's the Night", "Speakin' Out", and "Borrowed Tune"; harmonica on "World on a String", "Borrowed Tune", and "Mellow My Mind"; vibes on "New Mama"
- Ben Keith – pedal steel guitar, vocal on "Tonight's the Night", "Speakin' Out", "Roll Another Number", "Albuquerque", and "Tired Eyes"; pedal steel guitar on "World on a String" and "Mellow My Mind"; vocal on "New Mama"; slide guitar, vocal on "Lookout Joe"
- Nils Lofgren – piano on "World on a String", "Mellow My Mind", "Roll Another Number", "Albuquerque", "New Mama", and "Tired Eyes"; vocal on "Roll Another Number", "Albuquerque", and "Tired Eyes"; guitar on "Tonight's the Night" and "Speakin' Out"
- Danny Whitten – vocal, electric guitar on "Come On Baby Let's Go Downtown"
- Jack Nitzsche – electric piano on "Come On Baby Let's Go Downtown"; piano on "Lookout Joe"
- Billy Talbot – bass all tracks except "Borrowed Tune", "New Mama", and "Lookout Joe"
- Tim Drummond – bass on "Lookout Joe"
- Ralph Molina – drums, vocal all tracks except "Borrowed Tune", "New Mama", and "Lookout Joe"
- Kenny Buttrey – drums on "Lookout Joe"
- George Whitsell – vocal on "New Mama"

Additional roles

- Gary Burden – art direction
- Gijsbert Hanekroot, Joel Bernstein – photography

== Charts ==
1975 chart performance for Tonight's the Night
Chart (1975)	Peak position
Australian Albums (Kent Music Report)	42
Canadian RPM 100 Albums	12
Dutch MegaCharts Albums	10
French Album Charts	11
Japanese Album Charts	61
UK Album Charts	48
US Billboard Top LPs & Tape	25
US Cash Box Top 100 Albums	19
US Record World Album Chart	39

2025 chart performance for Tonight's the Night
Chart (2025)	Peak position
Croatian International Albums (HDU)	2
Hungarian Physical Albums (MAHASZ)	15

Year-end charts

Chart (1975)	Rank
Canadian Albums (RPM 100 Albums)	75

== Certifications ==
Region	Certification	Certified units/sales
Australia (ARIA)	Gold	35,000^{^}
United Kingdom (BPI)	Silver	60,000^{*}
^{*} Sales figures based on certification alone.^{^} Shipments figures based on certification alone.
