= New Mama =

1973 song by Neil Young

Song by Neil Young

from the album Tonight's the Night
- Released: June 20, 1975
- Recorded: September 10, 1973
- Studio: Studio Instrument Rentals, Hollywood
- Genre: Folk rock
- Length: 2:11
- Label: Reprise
- Songwriter(s): Neil Young
- Producer(s): David Briggs; Neil Young

"New Mama" is a song by Neil Young, recorded initially for his 1973 album Tonight's the Night.

It is said to have been inspired by the birth in 1972 of Zeke, his son with Carrie Snodgress. It is a slow song with sparse instrumentation—guitar, piano, and vibes.

Critics have described the song as "tender" and "poignantly lovely," but noted also that while it offered "some hope in family life," Tonight's the Night as a whole, an album of mourning, "did not offer solutions to the personal and professional problems it posed."

New Mama (first verse)

New mama's got a sun in her eyes
No clouds are in my changing skies
Each morning when I wake up to rise
I'm livin' in a dreamland.

Stephen Stills recorded the song for the 1975 album Stills. Young referred to the song on his 1982 album Trans, in the song "Transformer Man" ("Every morning when I look in your eyes, / I feel electrified by you"), and in "Big Time", a song from his 1996 album Broken Arrow ("I'm still living in dreamland").

== Personnel ==
- Neil Young – guitar, vibraphone, vocals
- Ben Keith – vocals
- Nils Lofgren – piano
- Ralph Molina – vocals
- George Whitsell – vocals
