= Joel Bernstein =

American photographer and musician

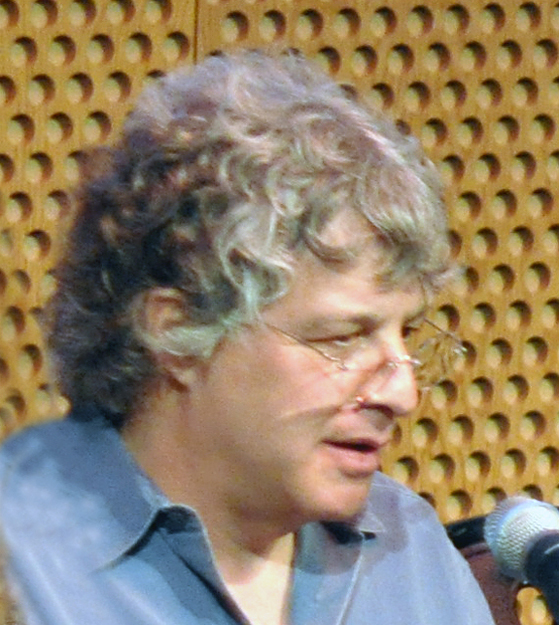
- Joel Bernstein 2010.
- Born: 1952 (age 73–74)
- Occupations: Photographer, musician, record producer
- Years active: 1968–present
- Musical career
- Genre: Rock and roll
- Instruments: Vocals, guitar
- Website: www.joelbernstein.com

Joel Bernstein is a photographer, guitarist, and record producer based in Oakland, California. His photographs have appeared as the album covers for After the Gold Rush, 4 Way Street, Rita Coolidge, Wind on the Water, Running on Empty, CSN, Bob Dylan at Budokan, Rust Never Sleeps, Shadows and Light, Hard Promises and many others. His photographs have been published in Time, The New York Times, and Rolling Stone, among other publications, and there have been retrospective exhibits of his work in New York City, San Francisco, Los Angeles, and London.

As a guitarist, he is most noted for support work to his friends David Crosby and Graham Nash, both individually and on their Crosby & Nash records. He has acted as a co-producer and archivist with Nash for Crosby, Stills, Nash & Young, and is responsible with Nash for the compilation and production of the box sets Voyage for Crosby, Reflections for Nash, Carry On for Stephen Stills, and CSNY 1974 for the band's tour of that year.

Joel Bernstein has been working with Neil Young since 1970 as albums and biography photographer along with Gary Burden and Henry Diltz, guitarist, producer, and photography and music tapes archivist, especially active on Neil Young Archives from the 1980s till now.

In 2018 Joel Bernstein was inducted into the International Photography Hall of Fame and Museum.
