= Neil Young discography and filmography =

Neil Young discography
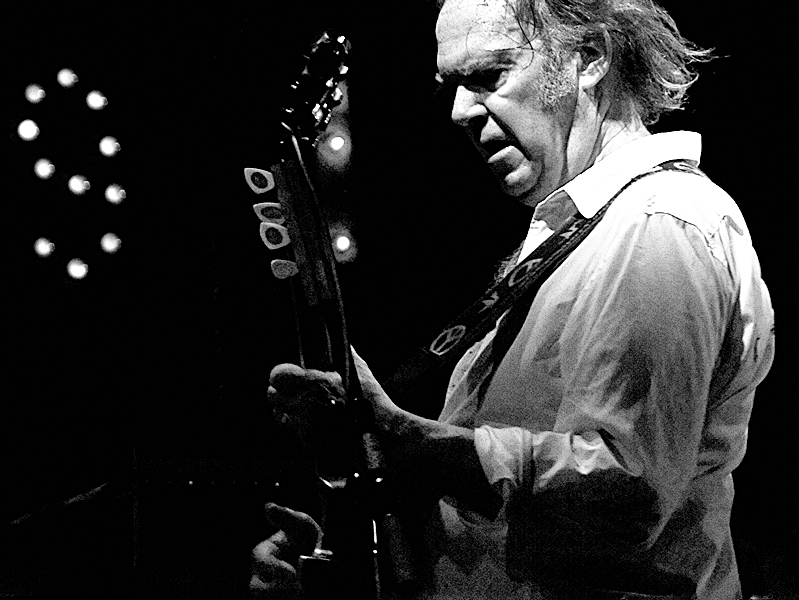
- Young performing in Florence on 22 June 2008
- Studio albums: 45
- Extended plays: 2
- Soundtrack albums: 4
- Live albums: 22
- Compilation albums: 3
- Tribute albums: 3
- Singles: 116
- The Stills-Young Band: 1
- Archives series: 31

The discography and filmography of Neil Young contains both albums and films produced by Young. Through his career most of Young's work has been recorded for and distributed by Reprise Records, a company owned by Warner Bros. Records since 1963 and now part of the Warner Music Group. The only exceptions are Young's five albums for Geffen Records in the 1980s, which were once distributed by Warner, but are now distributed by Universal Music Group.

== Albums ==
=== Studio albums ===
| Title | Series no. | Album details | Peak chart positions | | | | | | | | | | | | | | Certifications |
| Title | Series no. | Album details | CAN | AUS | FIN | FRA | GER | ITA | JPN | NED | NZ | NOR | SPA | SWE | UK | US | Certifications |
|---|---|---|---|---|---|---|---|---|---|---|---|---|---|---|---|---|---|
| Neil Young | ORS 00/01 | Released: November 12, 1968; Label: Reprise | — | — | — | — | — | — | 84 | — | — | — | — | — | — | — | |
| Everybody Knows This Is Nowhere (with Crazy Horse) | ORS 02 | Released: May 14, 1969; Label: Reprise | 32 | — | — | — | — | — | — | — | — | — | 18 | — | — | 34 | US: Platinum; UK: Silver |
| After the Gold Rush | ORS 03 | Released: September 19, 1970; Label: Reprise | 5 | 13 | — | — | — | — | 82 | 1 | — | 17 | 10 | 14 | 7 | 8 | UK: 2× Platinum; US: 2× Platinum |
| Harvest | ORS 04 | Released: February 1, 1972; Label: Reprise | 1 | 1 | 12 | 1 | 4 | 12 | 6 | 1 | 48 | 1 | 4 | 12 | 1 | 1 | AUS: 7× Platinum; GER: 3× Gold; ITA: Gold; UK: 3× Platinum; US: 4× Platinum |
| On the Beach | ORS 06 | Released: July 19, 1974; Label: Reprise | 13 | 34 | — | 3 | — | 15 | 48 | 5 | — | 10 | — | — | 42 | 16 | UK: Silver; US: Gold |
| Tonight's the Night | ORS 07 | Released: June 20, 1975; Label: Reprise | 12 | 42 | — | 11 | — | 19 | 61 | 10 | — | — | — | — | 48 | 25 | AUS: Gold; UK: Silver |
| Zuma (with Crazy Horse) | ORS 08 | Released: November 10, 1975; Label: Reprise | 69 | 44 | 27 | 13 | — | 17 | 84 | 4 | 35 | — | 13 | — | 44 | 25 | UK: Silver; US: Gold |
| Long May You Run (as Stills-Young Band) | ORS 08.5 | Released: September 10, 1976; Label: Reprise | 35 | 16 | — | — | — | — | — | 3 | 17 | 19 | — | — | 12 | 26 | UK: Silver; US: Gold |
| American Stars 'n Bars (with Crazy Horse) | ORS 09 | Released: May 27, 1977; Label: Reprise | 16 | 21 | 30 | 4 | — | 13 | 63 | 5 | 35 | 5 | — | 16 | 17 | 21 | UK: Silver; US: Gold |
| Comes a Time | ORS 10 | Released: October 21, 1978; Label: Reprise | 4 | 6 | 10 | 2 | — | 9 | 65 | 3 | 6 | 9 | — | — | 42 | 7 | AUS: 2× Platinum; NZ: Gold; UK: Gold; US: Gold |
| Rust Never Sleeps (with Crazy Horse) | ORS 11 | Released: June 22, 1979; Label: Reprise | 28 | 8 | 9 | — | 59 | 12 | — | 19 | 7 | — | — | 9 | 13 | 8 | NZ: Platinum; UK: Silver; US: Platinum |
| Hawks & Doves | ORS 13 | Released: October 29, 1980; Label: Reprise | 50 | 10 | — | — | — | 10 | 72 | 30 | 4 | 15 | — | 22 | 34 | 30 | |
| Re·ac·tor (with Crazy Horse) | ORS 14 | Released: October 28, 1981; Label: Reprise | 20 | 27 | — | — | — | 20 | — | — | 4 | 24 | — | 32 | 69 | 27 | |
| Trans | ORS 15 | Released: December 29, 1982; Label: Geffen | 10 | 23 | 27 | — | 51 | — | 90 | 32 | 8 | 13 | — | 6 | 29 | 19 | |
| Everybody's Rockin' (with The Shocking Pinks) | ORS 16 | Released: July 27, 1983; Label: Geffen | 22 | 30 | 29 | — | 61 | — | — | 29 | 21 | 18 | — | 15 | 50 | 46 | |
| Old Ways | ORS 17 | Released: August 12, 1985; Label: Geffen | 31 | 30 | 17 | — | — | — | — | 25 | 29 | — | — | 13 | 39 | 75 | |
| Landing on Water | ORS 18 | Released: July 21, 1986; Label: Geffen | 40 | 43 | 39 | — | — | — | — | 34 | — | — | — | 15 | 52 | 46 | |
| Life (with Crazy Horse) | ORS 19 | Released: June 30, 1987; Label: Geffen | 42 | — | — | — | — | — | — | 37 | — | — | — | 9 | 71 | 75 | |
| This Note's for You (with The Bluenotes) | ORS 20 | Released: April 12, 1988; Label: Reprise | 26 | 45 | — | — | — | — | — | 50 | 36 | — | — | 22 | 56 | 61 | |
| Freedom | ORS 22 | Released: October 2, 1989; Label: Reprise | 16 | — | — | — | 40 | — | — | 30 | — | — | — | 21 | 17 | 35 | CAN: Gold; UK: Silver; US: Gold |
| Ragged Glory (with Crazy Horse) | ORS 23 | Released: September 9, 1990; Label: Reprise | 20 | 62 | 18 | — | 42 | — | — | 19 | 22 | 13 | — | 25 | 15 | 31 | CAN: Gold; UK: Silver |
| Harvest Moon | ORS 26 | Released: November 2, 1992; Label: Reprise | 4 | 40 | 18 | 35 | 34 | — | 46 | 23 | 7 | 6 | — | 13 | 9 | 16 | CAN: 5× Platinum; AUS: Gold; NZ: Gold; UK: Gold; US: 2× Platinum |
| Sleeps with Angels (with Crazy Horse) | ORS 28 | Released: August 6, 1994; Label: Reprise | 7 | 23 | 2 | 29 | 11 | 29 | 65 | 10 | 17 | 4 | 29 | 2 | 2 | 9 | UK: Gold; US: Gold |
| Mirror Ball (featuring Pearl Jam) | ORS 29 | Released: June 27, 1995; Label: Reprise | 4 | 4 | 11 | 19 | 8 | 17 | 40 | 18 | 10 | 2 | 33 | 3 | 4 | 5 | UK: Silver; US: Gold |
| Broken Arrow (with Crazy Horse) | ORS 31 | Released: July 2, 1996; Label: Reprise | 19 | 43 | 12 | 42 | 13 | 42 | — | 24 | 27 | 9 | — | 14 | 17 | 31 | |
| Silver & Gold | ORS 33 | Released: April 25, 2000; Label: Reprise | 5 | 30 | 18 | 38 | 5 | 11 | 45 | 25 | 49 | 2 | — | 9 | 10 | 22 | |
| Are You Passionate? (featuring Booker T. & the M.G.'s) | ORS 35 | Released: April 9, 2002; Label: Reprise | 17 | 41 | 8 | 41 | 11 | 20 | 70 | 21 | 25 | 4 | 41 | 4 | 24 | 10 | |
| Greendale (with Crazy Horse) | ORS 36 | Released: August 19, 2003; Label: Reprise | 22 | 48 | 12 | 32 | 6 | 6 | 70 | 20 | 41 | 5 | 60 | 5 | 24 | 22 | |
| Prairie Wind | ORS 37 | Released: September 27, 2005; Label: Reprise | 3 | 59 | 16 | 25 | 16 | 9 | 72 | 15 | 29 | 3 | 65 | 3 | 22 | 11 | UK: Silver; US: Gold |
| Living with War | ORS 38 | Released: May 2, 2006; Label: Reprise | 7 | 41 | 18 | 92 | 13 | 28 | 101 | 24 | 31 | 4 | 37 | 11 | 14 | 15 | |
| Living with War: "In the Beginning" | ORS 38.5 | Released: December 19, 2006; Label: Reprise | — | — | — | — | — | — | — | — | — | — | — | — | — | — | |
| Chrome Dreams II | ORS 39 | Released: October 16, 2007; Label: Reprise | 8 | 38 | 32 | 9 | 13 | 28 | 134 | 14 | — | 5 | 80 | 13 | 14 | 11 | |
| Fork in the Road | ORS 40 | Released: April 7, 2009; Label: Reprise | 15 | 37 | 16 | 31 | 17 | 36 | 104 | 23 | 28 | 1 | 38 | 11 | 22 | 19 | |
| Le Noise | ORS 41 | Released: September 28, 2010; Label: Reprise | 2 | 41 | 30 | 23 | 22 | 26 | 85 | 18 | 30 | 3 | 21 | 2 | 18 | 14 | CAN: Gold |
| Americana (with Crazy Horse) | ORS 42 | Released: June 5, 2012; Label: Reprise | 2 | 34 | 19 | 27 | 12 | 32 | 64 | 15 | 26 | 11 | 14 | 11 | 16 | 4 | |
| Psychedelic Pill (with Crazy Horse) | ORS 43 | Released: October 30, 2012; Label: Reprise | 7 | 28 | 18 | 19 | 4 | 19 | 71 | 11 | 20 | 6 | 25 | 7 | 14 | 8 | |
| A Letter Home | ORS 44 | Released: April 18, 2014; Label: Third Man | 17 | 46 | 26 | 42 | 19 | 41 | 69 | 18 | 37 | 37 | 46 | 52 | 17 | 13 | |
| Storytone | ORS 45 | Released: November 4, 2014; Label: Reprise | — | — | 28 | 54 | 11 | 35 | 129 | 28 | — | 7 | 42 | 21 | 20 | 33 | |
| The Monsanto Years (with Promise of the Real) | ORS 46 | Released: June 29, 2015; Label: Reprise | — | 23 | 23 | 24 | 13 | 27 | 110 | 14 | — | 38 | 40 | 47 | 24 | 21 | |
| Peace Trail | ORS 48 | Released: December 9, 2016; Label: Reprise | 72 | 52 | — | — | 23 | 75 | 97 | 23 | — | 36 | 82 | 14 | 57 | 76 | |
| The Visitor (with Promise of the Real) | ORS 49 | Released: December 1, 2017; Label: Reprise | 43 | 85 | 47 | 113 | 25 | — | 168 | 39 | — | 36 | 52 | 32 | 65 | 167 | |
| Colorado (with Crazy Horse) | ORS 50 | Released: October 25, 2019; Label: Reprise | 83 | — (Note: Colorado did not enter the ARIA Albums Chart, but peaked at number 19 on the ARIA Digital Album Chart.) | 14 | 36 | 6 | 36 | 94 | 21 | 40 | 5 | 15 | 13 | 17 | 46 | |
| Barn (with Crazy Horse) | ORS 51 | Released: December 10, 2021; Label: Reprise | 51 | 54 | 14 | 25 | 5 | 33 | — | 9 | — | 8 | 40 | 11 | 16 | 66 | |
| World Record (with Crazy Horse) | ORS 52 | Released: November 18, 2022; Label: Reprise | — | — | 42 | 51 | 5 | 69 | — | 31 | — | — | 59 | 47 | 45 | — | |
| Talkin to the Trees (with Chrome Hearts) | ORS 55 | Released: June 13, 2025; Label: Reprise | — | 12 | — | 66 | 9 | — | — | 87 | — | — | — | — | — | — | |
| Second Song (with Chrome Hearts) | | Released: September 18, 2026; Label: Reprise | — | — | — | — | 18 | — | — | 37 | — | — | — | — | — | — | |
"—" denotes items that did not chart or were not released in that territory.

=== Live albums ===
| Title | Series no. | Album details | Peak chart positions | | | | | | | | | | | | | | Certifications |
| Title | Series no. | Album details | CAN | AUS | FIN | FRA | GER | ITA | JPN | NED | NZ | NOR | SPA | SWE | UK | US | Certifications |
|---|---|---|---|---|---|---|---|---|---|---|---|---|---|---|---|---|---|
| Time Fades Away | ORS 05 | Released: October 15, 1973; Label: Reprise | 9 | 29 | — | — | — | — | 24 | — | — | 16 | — | 17 | 20 | 22 | US: Gold |
| Live Rust (with Crazy Horse) | ORS 12 | Released: November 19, 1979; Label: Reprise | 27 | 21 | 18 | — | — | — | — | — | 1 | 27 | — | — | 55 | 15 | NZ: Platinum; UK: Gold; US: Platinum |
| Weld (with Crazy Horse) | ORS 24 | Released: October 23, 1991; Label: Reprise | 58 | 90 | 27 | — | — | — | — | 46 | — | 12 | — | 33 | 20 | 154 | UK: Silver |
| Arc (with Crazy Horse) | ORS 25 | Released: October 23, 1991; Label: Reprise | — | — | — | — | — | — | — | — | — | — | — | — | — | — | |
| Unplugged | ORS 27 | Released: June 8, 1993; Label: Reprise | 8 | 19 | 7 | 38 | 31 | — | 37 | 13 | 16 | 5 | — | 8 | 4 | 23 | AUS: Gold; UK: Gold; US: Gold |
| Year of the Horse (with Crazy Horse) | ORS 32 | Released: June 17, 1997; Label: Reprise | 75 | 77 | 19 | — | 30 | — | — | 51 | — | 19 | — | 35 | 36 | 57 | |
| Road Rock Vol. 1 (with friends and relatives) | ORS 34 | Released: December 5, 2000; Label: Reprise | — | — | — | — | 49 | — | — | — | — | 37 | — | — | — | 169 | |
| Earth (with Promise of the Real) | ORS 47 | Released: June 24, 2016; Label: Reprise | — | 37 | 32 | 29 | 10 | 33 | 174 | 30 | — | 30 | 49 | 40 | 14 | 138 | |
| Before and After | ORS 53 | Released: December 8, 2023; Label: Reprise | — | — | — | 126 | 29 | — | — | 50 | — | — | — | — | — | — | |
| Fuckin' Up (with Crazy Horse) | ORS 54 | Released: April 26, 2024; Label: Reprise | — | — | — | 130 | 12 | — | — | — | — | — | 80 | — | — | — | |
| Coastal: The Soundtrack | | Released: April 18, 2025; Label: Reprise | — | — | — | — | 50 | — | — | — | — | — | — | — | — | — | |
"—" denotes items that did not chart or were not released in that territory.

Neil Young has included material recorded live on many of his albums; listed here are albums consisting completely or primarily of live concert recordings. Time Fades Away consists of previously unreleased material. Weld and Arc were initially released as a single package, Arc-Weld. See also the Archives Series listed separately below.

=== Compilation albums ===
| Title | Series no. | Album details | Peak chart positions | | | | | | | | | | | | | Certifications |
| Title | Series no. | Album details | CAN | AUS | FIN | FRA | GER | ITA | JPN | NED | NZ | NOR | SWE | UK | US | Certifications |
|---|---|---|---|---|---|---|---|---|---|---|---|---|---|---|---|---|
| Decade | ORS 9.9 | Released: October 28, 1977; Label: Reprise | 47 | 21 | 40 | — | — | 38 | — | 7 | 34 | 28 | — | 46 | 43 | AUS: Platinum; UK: Platinum; US: Platinum |
| Lucky Thirteen | ORS 26 | Released: January 6, 1993; Label: Geffen | — | — | 34 | — | 69 | — | — | 73 | — | — | — | 69 | — | |
| Greatest Hits | ORS 36.5 | Released: November 2004; Label: Reprise | 21 | 25 | 24 | 174 | 41 | 72 | 84 | 49 | 3 | 10 | 13 | 45 | 27 | CAN: Gold; AUS: Platinum; GER: Platinum; NZ: 2× Platinum; UK: Platinum; US: Gold |
"—" denotes items that did not chart or were not released in that territory.

=== Box sets ===
| Title | Album details | Peak chart positions | | |
| Title | Album details | AUS | NZ | UK |
|---|---|---|---|---|
| Gold Anniversary Edition (Harvest/Harvest Moon) | Released: August 1994; Label: Warner Australasia | 38 | 44 | — |
| Official Release Series Discs 1–4 (Neil Young/Everybody Knows This Is Nowhere/After the Gold Rush/Harvest) | Released: June 2012; Label: Reprise | — | — | 30 |
| Original Release Series Discs 5–8 (Time Fades Away/On the Beach/Tonight's the Night/Zuma) | Released: August 2017; Label: Reprise | — | — | — |
| Original Release Series Discs 8.5–12 (Long May You Run/American Stars & Bars/Comes a Time/Rust Never Sleeps/Live Rust) | Released: August 2017; Label: Reprise | — | — | — |
| Official Release Series Discs 13, 14, 20 & 21 (Hawks & Doves/Re·ac·tor/This Note's for You/Eldorado) | Released: April 2022; Label: Reprise | — | — | — |
| Official Release Series Discs 22, 23+, 24 & 25 (Freedom/Ragged Glory (Smell the Horse Edition)/Weld/Arc) | Released: July 2023; Label: Reprise | — | — | — |
| Official Release Series Discs 26, 27, 28 & 29 (Harvest Moon/Unplugged/Sleeps With Angels/Mirror Ball) | Released: October 2025; Label: Reprise | — | — | — |
"—" denotes items that did not chart or were not released in that territory.

=== Soundtracks ===
| Title | Series no. | Album details | Peak chart positions | | | | | |
| Title | Series no. | Album details | CAN | AUS | JPN | FRA | AUT | US |
|---|---|---|---|---|---|---|---|---|
| Journey Through the Past | -- | Released: November 7, 1972; Label: Reprise | 19 | 39 | 32 | — | — | 45 |
| Where the Buffalo Roam | -- | Released: March 1, 1980; Label: Backstreet | — | — | — | — | — | — |
| Dead Man | ORS 30 | Released: February 27, 1996; Label: Vapor | — | — | — | — | 37 | — |
| Paradox | SRS 10 | Released: March 23, 2018; Label: Shakey Pictures Inc. | — | — | — | 171 | 36 | — |
"—" denotes items that did not chart or were not released in that territory.

=== Archives series ===
| Title | Series no. | Album details | Peak chart positions | | | | | | | | | | | | | |
| Title | Series no. | Album details | CAN | AUS | AUT | FRA | GER | ITA | JPN | NED | NZ | NOR | SPA | SWE | UK | US |
|---|---|---|---|---|---|---|---|---|---|---|---|---|---|---|---|---|
| Live at the Fillmore East (with Crazy Horse) | PS 02 | Released: November 14, 2006; Label: Reprise | — | — | — | — | 81 | 74 | — | 64 | — | — | — | 32 | 88 | 55 |
| Live at Massey Hall 1971 | PS 03 | Released: March 13, 2007; Label: Reprise/WEA | 1 | 34 | 54 | 78 | 63 | 30 | 99 | 5 | — | 6 | — | 5 | 30 | 6 |
| Sugar Mountain – Live at Canterbury House 1968 | PS 00 | Released: November 25, 2008; Label: Reprise | 49 | — | — | 124 | — | 72 | 115 | 59 | — | 30 | — | 47 | 72 | 40 |
| The Archives Vol. 1 1963–1972 | -- | Released: June 2, 2009; Label: Warner Bros. | — | — | — | — | 96 | — | — | — | — | 18 | — | 50 | — | 102 |
| Live at the Riverboat 1969 | PS 01 | Released: June 2, 2009; Label: Warner Bros. | — | — | — | — | — | — | — | — | — | — | — | — | — | — |
| Dreamin' Man Live '92 | PS 12 | Released: December 8, 2009; Label: Reprise | — | — | — | — | — | — | — | 74 | — | — | — | — | — | 193 |
| A Treasure (with The International Harvesters) | PS 09 | Released: June 7, 2011; Label: Reprise | 18 | — | 39 | 116 | 28 | 56 | — | 22 | 37 | 9 | 43 | 19 | 38 | 29 |
| Live at the Cellar Door | PS 02.5 | Released: December 10, 2013; Label: Reprise | — | — | 61 | 120 | 45 | — | 72 | 35 | — | — | — | 38 | 57 | 28 |
| Bluenote Café (with The Bluenotes) | PS 11 | Released: November 13, 2015; Label: Reprise | — | — | 23 | 84 | 16 | 55 | 162 | 21 | — | 24 | 86 | 55 | 39 | 89 |
| Hitchhiker | SRS 05 | Released: September 8, 2017; Label: Reprise | 23 | 22 | 9 | 27 | 8 | 31 | 70 | 14 | 18 | 10 | 15 | 7 | 6 | 20 |
| Roxy: Tonight's the Night Live (with The Santa Monica Flyers) | PS 05 | Released: April 21, 2018 (Record Store Day); April 24, 2018 (standard release); Label: Reprise | — | 97 | 25 | 141 | 20 | 69 | 82 | 41 | — | 23 | 36 | 53 | 30 | 70 |
| Songs for Judy | PS 07 | Released: November 30, 2018; Label: Shakey Pictures Records; Features solo performances recorded during a November 1976 tour | — | — | 57 | 138 | 54 | 79 | 135 | 47 | — | — | 68 | 55 | 62 | — |
| Tuscaloosa (with The Stray Gators) | PS 04 | Released: June 7, 2019; Label: Reprise | — | — | 28 | 59 | 20 | 55 | 111 | 57 | — | — | 23 | 39 | 30 | 108 |
| Homegrown | SRS 02 | Released: June 19, 2020; Label: Reprise | 51 | 17 | 3 | 12 | 4 | 10 | 29 | 2 | 5 | 2 | 62 | 6 | 2 | 17 |
| Return to Greendale (with Crazy Horse) | PS 16 | Released: November 6, 2020; Label: Reprise | — | — | 20 | — | 15 | — | — | 67 | — | — | 39 | — | — | — |
| Neil Young Archives Volume II: 1972–1976 | -- | Release: November 20, 2020; Label: Reprise | — | — | — | 151 | 8 | — | — | 37 | — | — | — | — | — | — |
| Way Down in the Rust Bucket (with Crazy Horse) | PS 11.5 | Release: February 26, 2021; Label: Reprise | — | — | 9 | 99 | 7 | — | — | 45 | — | 24 | 17 | 34 | 18 | 109 |
| Young Shakespeare | PS 3.5 | Release: March 26, 2021; Label: Reprise | — | — | 20 | 72 | 12 | — | — | 22 | — | — | 59 | 34 | 29 | 95 |
| Carnegie Hall 1970 | OBS 01 | Released: October 1, 2021; Label: Reprise | — | — | 19 | 64 | 16 | 42 | — | 21 | — | 21 | 38 | 58 | 32 | 145 |
| Dorothy Chandler Pavilion 1971 | OBS 03 | Released: May 6, 2022; Label: Reprise | — | — | — | — | 40 | — | — | 64 | — | — | 79 | — | — | — |
| Royce Hall 1971 | OBS 04 | Released: May 6, 2022; Label: Reprise | — | — | — | 183 | 34 | — | — | 78 | — | — | 71 | — | — | — |
| Citizen Kane Jr. Blues | OBS 05 | Released: May 6, 2022; Label: Reprise | — | — | — | — | 33 | — | — | 59 | — | — | 69 | — | — | — |
| Toast (with Crazy Horse) | SRS 09 | Released: July 8, 2022; Label: Reprise | — | — | 7 | 77 | 4 | 97 | — | 18 | — | — | 37 | 34 | 23 | 198 |
| Noise & Flowers (with Promise of the Real) | PS 21 | Released: August 5, 2022; Label: Reprise | — | — | 23 | 101 | 7 | — | — | 16 | — | — | 42 | — | 44 | — |
| Somewhere Under the Rainbow (with the Santa Monica Flyers) | OBS 06 | Released: April 14, 2023; Label: Reprise | — | — | 36 | 119 | 18 | — | — | 67 | — | — | 54 | — | 94 | — |
| High Flyin' (with The Ducks) | OBS 02 | Released: April 14, 2023; Label: Reprise | — | — | — | — | 53 | — | — | — | — | — | 77 | — | — | — |
| Chrome Dreams | SRS 06 | Released: August 11, 2023; Label: Reprise | — | — | 14 | 57 | 4 | 96 | — | 33 | — | — | 57 | 60 | 56 | 186 |
| Odeon Budokan | SRS 04 | Released: September 1, 2023; Label: Reprise | — | — | — | — | 45 | — | — | — | — | — | — | — | — | — |
| Dume (with Crazy Horse) | SRS 03 | Released: February 23, 2024; Label: Reprise | — | — | 68 | — | 12 | — | — | — | — | — | — | — | — | — |
| Early Daze (with Crazy Horse) | SRS 01 | Released: June 28, 2024; Label: Reprise | — | — | 20 | — | 12 | — | — | — | — | — | 67 | — | — | — |
| Neil Young Archives Volume III: 1976–1987 | -- | Released: September 6, 2024; Label: Reprise | — | — | 68 | 200 | 23 | — | — | — | — | — | — | — | — | — |
| Oceanside Countryside | SRS 07 | Released: March 7, 2025 (vinyl LP), April 25, 2025 (CD); Label: Reprise | — | — | — | — | 24 | — | — | — | — | — | — | — | — | — |
"—" denotes items that did not chart or were not released in that territory.

== EPs ==
| Title | Series no. | EP details | Peak chart positions | | | |
| Title | Series no. | EP details | FRA | GER | ITA | UK |
|---|---|---|---|---|---|---|
| Eldorado | ORS 21 | Released: April 7, 1989; Label: Reprise | — | 44 | — | — |
| The Times | -- | Released: September 9, 2020; Label: Reprise | 107 | 57 | 89 | 99 |

== Singles ==
| Year | Title | Peak chart positions | | | | | | Certification | Album |
| Year | Title | CAN | CAN AC | CAN Country | US | US Rock | UK | Certification | Album |
|---|---|---|---|---|---|---|---|---|---|
| 1969 | "The Loner"/"Sugar Mountain" (non-album track) | — | — | — | — | — | — | | Neil Young |
| 1969 | "Everybody Knows This Is Nowhere" (different version to album track) /"The Emperor of Wyoming" | — | — | — | — | — | — | | Everybody Knows This Is Nowhere |
| 1969 | "Down by the River"/"The Losing End (When You're On)" | — | — | — | — | — | — | | Everybody Knows This Is Nowhere |
| 1969 | "Oh Lonesome Me"/"I've Been Waiting for You"(from Neil Young) | — | — | — | — | — | — | | Later released on After the Gold Rush |
| 1970 | "Cinnamon Girl"/"Sugar Mountain" (non-album track) | 25 | — | — | 55 | — | — | | Everybody Knows This Is Nowhere |
| 1970 | "Only Love Can Break Your Heart"/"Birds" | 16 | — | — | 33 | — | — | | After the Gold Rush |
| 1971 | "When You Dance I Can Really Love"/"Sugar Mountain" (non-album track) | 54 | — | — | 93 | — | — | | After the Gold Rush |
| 1971 | "Heart of Gold"/"Sugar Mountain" (non-album track) | 1 | — | — | 1 | — | 10 | RIAA: Gold; BPI: Gold; RMNZ: 4× Platinum | Harvest |
| 1972 | "Old Man"/"The Needle and the Damage Done" | 4 | — | — | 31 | — | — | RMNZ: 2× Platinum | Harvest |
| 1972 | "War Song" (with Graham Nash)/"The Needle and the Damage Done" (from Harvest) | 40 | — | — | 61 | — | — | | single only |
| 1973 | "Time Fades Away" (live)/"The Last Trip to Tulsa" (live) | — | — | — | 108 | — | — | | Time Fades Away |
| 1974 | "Walk On"/"For the Turnstiles" | — | — | — | 69 | — | — | | On the Beach |
| 1975 | "Lookin' for a Love"/"Sugar Mountain" (non-album track) | 48 | — | — | — | — | — | | Zuma |
| 1976 | "Stupid Girl"/"Drive Back" | — | — | — | — | — | — | | Zuma |
| 1976 | "Long May You Run"/"12/8 Blues (All the Same)" | — | — | — | — | — | — | | Long May You Run |
| 1976 | "Midnight on the Bay"/"Black Coral" | — | — | — | 105 | — | — | | Long May You Run |
| 1977 | "Hey Babe"/"Homegrown" | — | — | — | — | — | — | | American Stars 'n Bars |
| 1977 | "Like a Hurricane"/"Hold Back the Tears" | — | — | — | — | — | 48 | | American Stars 'n Bars |
| 1977 | "Sugar Mountain"/"The Needle and the Damage Done" | — | — | — | — | — | — | | Decade |
| 1978 | "Comes a Time"/"Motorcycle Mama" | — | — | — | — | — | — | | Comes a Time |
| 1978 | "Four Strong Winds" (NA B-side: "Human Highway", UK B-side: "Motorcycle Mama") | 61 | 18 | 48 | 61 | — | 57 | | Comes a Time |
| 1979 | "Hey Hey, My My (Into the Black)"/"My My, Hey Hey (Out of the Blue)" | — | — | — | 79 | — | — | RMNZ: Platinum | Rust Never Sleeps |
| 1980 | "The Loner"(live)/"Cinnamon Girl" (live) | — | — | — | — | — | — | | Live Rust |
| 1980 | "Stayin' Power"/"Captain Kennedy" | — | — | — | — | — | — | | Hawks & Doves |
| 1980 | "Hawks & Doves"/"Union Man" | — | — | — | — | — | — | | Hawks & Doves |
| 1981 | "Opera Star"/"Surfer Joe and Moe the Sleaze" | — | — | — | — | — | — | | Re·ac·tor |
| 1981 | "Southern Pacific"/"Motor City" | — | — | — | 70 | 22 | — | | Re·ac·tor |
| 1982 | "Little Thing Called Love"/"We R in Control" | — | — | — | 71 | 12 | — | | Trans |
| 1982 | "Sample and Hold"/"Computer Age" | — | — | — | — | — | — | | Trans |
| 1983 | "Mr. Soul (Parts I and II)" | — | — | — | — | 14 | — | | Trans |
| 1983 | "Wonderin'"/"Payola Blues" | — | — | — | — | — | — | | Everybody's Rockin' |
| 1983 | "Cry, Cry, Cry"/"Payola Blues" | — | — | — | — | — | — | | Everybody's Rockin' |
| 1985 | "Get Back to the Country"^{[A]}/"Misfits" | — | — | 32 | — | — | — | | Old Ways |
| 1985 | "Old Ways"/"Once an Angel" | — | — | 32 | — | — | — | | Old Ways |
| 1985 | "Are There Any More Real Cowboys?" (with Willie Nelson; b/w Willie Nelson's "I'm a Memory") | — | — | — | — | — | — | | Old Ways |
| 1986 | "Touch the Night" | — | — | — | — | 8 | — | | Landing on Water |
| 1986 | "Weight of the World"/"Pressure" | — | — | — | — | 33 | — | | Landing on Water |
| 1987 | "Long Walk Home"/"Cryin' Eyes" | — | — | — | — | 14 | — | | Life |
| 1987 | "Mideast Vacation"/"Long Walk Home" | — | — | — | — | — | — | | Life |
| 1988 | "This Note's for You" (edited live version)/"This Note's for You" (LP version) | 80 | — | — | — | 19 | — | | This Note's for You |
| 1988 | "Ten Men Workin'" (b/w "I'm Goin'", non-album track) | — | — | — | — | 6 | — | | This Note's for You |
| 1989 | "Rockin' in the Free World" (edited version)/"Rockin' in the Free World" (live acoustic version) | 39 | — | — | — | 2 | — | RMNZ: Gold | Freedom |
| 1989 | "No More" | — | — | — | — | 7 | — | | Freedom |
| 1989 | "Someday"/"Don't Cry" (European release only) | — | — | — | — | — | — | | Freedom |
| 1990 | "Mansion on the Hill" (b/w "Don't Spook the Horse", non-album track) | — | — | — | — | 3 | — | | Ragged Glory |
| 1990 | "Over and Over" | — | — | — | — | 33 | — | | Ragged Glory |
| 1990 | "Love to Burn" | — | — | — | — | 49 | — | | Ragged Glory |
| 1990 | "Crime in the City" (live) | — | — | — | — | 34 | — | | Weld |
| 1991 | "Arc, the Single" | — | — | — | — | — | — | | Arc |
| 1992 | "War of Man" | — | — | — | — | 7 | — | | Harvest Moon |
| 1992 | "Harvest Moon"/"Old King" | 5 | 11 | — | — | — | 36 | BPI: Platinum; RMNZ: 2× Platinum | Harvest Moon |
| 1992 | "Unknown Legend" | — | — | — | — | 38 | — | | Harvest Moon |
| 1993 | "The Needle and the Damage Done"/"You and Me" (live) | — | — | — | — | — | 75 | | Unplugged |
| 1993 | "Long May You Run"/"Sugar Mountain" (live) | 28 | — | — | — | 34 | 71 | | Unplugged |
| 1993 | "All Along the Watchtower" (European release, with Booker T. & the MGs) | — | — | — | — | — | — | | Bob Dylan – The 30th Anniversary Concert Celebration |
| 1994 | "Rockin' in the Free World" (UK re-release) | — | — | — | — | — | 83 | | Freedom |
| 1994 | "Philadelphia" | — | — | — | — | — | 62 | | Philadelphia |
| 1994 | "Change Your Mind" | — | — | — | — | 18 | 89 | | Sleeps with Angels |
| 1994 | "Piece of Crap" | — | — | — | — | — | — | | Sleeps with Angels |
| 1995 | "Downtown"/"Big Green Country" (featuring Pearl Jam) | 13 | — | — | — | 6 | 91 | | Mirror Ball |
| 1995 | "Peace and Love" (featuring Pearl Jam) | — | — | — | — | 34 | — | | Mirror Ball |
| 1996 | "Big Time" (b/w "Interstate", non-album track) | — | — | — | — | 35 | — | | Broken Arrow |
| 2000 | "Razor Love"/"Buffalo Springfield Again" | — | — | — | — | — | — | | Silver & Gold |
| 2000 | "Good to See You" | — | — | — | — | — | — | | Silver & Gold |
| 2000 | "Fool for Your Love"/"All Along the Watchtower" | — | — | — | — | — | — | | Road Rock Vol. 1 |
| 2001 | "Let's Roll" | — | — | — | — | 32 | — | | Are You Passionate? |
| 2006 | "Let's Impeach the President" | — | — | — | — | — | — | | Living with War |
| 2009 | "Fork in the Road" | — | — | — | — | — | — | | Fork in the Road |
| 2009 | "Johnny Magic" | — | — | — | — | — | — | | Fork in the Road |
| 2010 | "Love and War" | — | — | — | — | — | — | | Le Noise |
| 2011 | "Sign of Love" | — | — | — | — | — | — | | Le Noise |
| 2011 | "Grey Riders" | — | — | — | — | — | — | | A Treasure |
| 2012 | "Hitchhiker" | — | — | — | — | — | — | | Psychedelic Pill |
| 2012 | "Born in Ontario" | — | — | — | — | — | — | | Psychedelic Pill |
| 2014 | "Who's Gonna Stand Up" | — | — | — | — | — | — | | Storytone |
| 2015 | "A Rock Star Bucks a Coffee Shop" | — | — | — | — | — | — | | The Monsanto Years |
| 2015 | "Wolf Moon" | — | — | — | — | — | — | | The Monsanto Years |
| 2016 | "My Pledge" | — | — | — | — | — | — | | Peace Trail |
| 2016 | "Indian Givers" | — | — | — | — | — | — | | Peace Trail |
| 2016 | "Peace Trail" | — | — | — | — | — | — | | Peace Trail |
| 2016 | "Show Me" | — | — | — | — | — | — | | Peace Trail |
| 2017 | "Children of Destiny" | — | — | — | — | — | — | | The Visitor |
| 2017 | "Hitchhiker" | — | — | — | — | — | — | | Hitchhiker |
| 2017 | "Already Great" | — | — | — | — | — | — | | The Visitor |
| 2018 | "Almost Always" | — | — | — | — | — | — | | The Visitor |
| 2018 | "Peace Trail" | — | — | — | — | — | — | | Paradox |
| 2019 | "Milky Way" | — | — | — | — | — | — | | Colorado |
| 2019 | "Rainbow of Colors" | — | — | — | — | — | — | | Colorado |
| 2020 | "Lookin' for a Leader 2020" | — | — | — | — | — | — | | The Times |
| 2020 | "Falling from Above" | — | — | — | — | — | — | | Return to Greendale |
| 2020 | "Bandit" | — | — | — | — | — | — | | Return to Greendale |
| 2020 | "Come Along and Say You Will" | — | — | — | — | — | — | | Neil Young Archives Volume II: 1972—1976 |
| 2020 | "Homefires" | — | — | — | — | — | — | | Neil Young Archives Volume II: 1972—1976 |
| 2020 | "Powderfinger" | — | — | — | — | — | — | | Neil Young Archives Volume II: 1972—1976 |
| 2020 | "The Losing End" | — | — | — | — | — | — | | Neil Young Archives Volume II: 1972—1976 |
| 2020 | "Goodbye Christians on the Shore" | — | — | — | — | — | — | | Neil Young Archives Volume II: 1972—1976 |
| 2021 | "Pocahontas" | — | — | — | — | — | — | | Neil Young Archives Volume II: 1972—1976 |
| 2021 | "Daughters" | — | — | — | — | — | — | | Neil Young Archives Volume II: 1972—1976 |
| 2021 | "Stringman" | — | — | — | — | — | — | | Neil Young Archives Volume II: 1972—1976 |
| 2021 | "Country Home" | — | — | — | — | — | — | | Way Down in the Rust Bucket |
| 2021 | "Don't Cry No Tears" | — | — | — | — | — | — | | Way Down in the Rust Bucket |
| 2021 | "Homegrown" | — | — | — | — | — | — | | Way Down in the Rust Bucket |
| 2021 | "Tell Me Why" | — | — | — | — | — | — | | Young Shakespeare |
| 2021 | "Down by the River" | — | — | — | — | — | — | | Young Shakespeare |
| 2021 | "Song of the Seasons" | — | — | — | — | — | — | | Barn |
| 2021 | "Heading West" | — | — | — | — | — | — | | Barn |
| 2021 | "Welcome Back" | — | — | — | — | — | — | | Barn |
| 2022 | "From Hank to Hendrix" | — | — | — | — | — | — | | Noise & Flowers |
| 2022 | "Love Earth" | — | — | — | — | — | — | | World Record |
| 2022 | "Break the Chain" | — | — | — | — | — | — | | World Record |
| 2023 | "Chevrolet" | — | — | — | — | — | — | | World Record |
| 2023 | "I'm the Ocean" / "Homefires" / "Burned" | — | — | — | — | — | — | | Before and After |
| 2023 | "On the Way Home" / "If You Got Love" / "A Dream That Can Last" | — | — | — | — | — | — | | Before and After |
| 2024 | "Stand for Peace" | — | — | — | — | — | — | | Non-album single |
| 2024 | "Bright Sunny Day" | — | — | — | — | — | — | | Neil Young Archives Volume III: 1976–1987 |
| 2024 | "Winter Winds" | — | — | — | — | — | — | | Neil Young Archives Volume III: 1976–1987 |
| 2024 | "Lady Wingshot" | — | — | — | — | — | — | | Neil Young Archives Volume III: 1976–1987 |
| 2024 | "Thrasher" | — | — | — | — | — | — | | Neil Young Archives Volume III: 1976–1987 |
| 2025 | "Big Change" | — | — | — | — | — | — | | Talkin' to the Trees |
| 2025 | "Let's Roll Again" | — | — | — | — | — | — | | Talkin' to the Trees |
Local national releases not included. "—" denotes releases that did not chart. US charts are Billboard unless otherwise noted. * Cash Box Singles Chart. ** Record World Singles Chart.

^{A} Peaked at No. 33 on the US Hot Country Songs chart.

== Other appearances ==
=== Studio appearances ===
| Year | Song | Album |
|---|---|---|
| 1994 | "Philadelphia" | Philadelphia |
| 1996 | "Spring Is Nearly Here" (with Randy Bachman) | Twang! A Tribute to Hank Marvin & the Shadows |
| 2010 | "This Wheel's on Fire" (with the Sadies) | A Canadian Celebration of the Band |
| 2017 | "Campfire" (with DRAM) | Bright: The Album |

=== Live appearances ===
| Year | Song | Album |
|---|---|---|
| 2005 | "Walkin' to New Orleans" | ReAct Now download |
| 2023 | "Song of the Seasons" | All Roads Lead Home |
| 2023 | "Are There Any More Real Cowboys?" | (Long Story Short) Willie Nelson 90 (Live at the Hollywood Bowl) |

=== Guest appearances ===
| Year | Song(s) | Album | Artist |
|---|---|---|---|
| 1968 | "As We Go Along" | Head | The Monkees |
| 1969 | "You and I" | Instant Replay | The Monkees |
| 1971 | "Music Is Love" / "What Are Their Names" | If I Could Only Remember My Name | David Crosby |
| 1971 | "Helpless" / "She Used to Want to Be a Ballerina" / "Sweet September Morning" | She Used to Wanna Be a Ballerina | Buffy Sainte-Marie |
| 1971 | "I Used to Be King" / "Man in the Mirror" / "Better Days" | Songs for Beginners | Graham Nash |
| 1971 | "Outlaw" / "Pioneer Mary" / "See What Love Can Do" | Grin | Grin |
| 1974 | "And So It Goes" | Wild Tales | Graham Nash |
| 1975 | "Light of the Stable" | Light of the Stable | Emmylou Harris |
| 1976 | "Furry Sings the Blues" | Hejira | Joni Mitchell |
| 1978 | various | Crazy Moon | Crazy Horse |
| 1985 | "Harriet Tubman" | Stealin Horses | Stealin Horses |
| 1987 | "Sentimental Hygiene" | Sentimental Hygiene | Warren Zevon |
| 1989 | "All That You Have Is Your Soul" | Crossroads | Tracy Chapman |
| 1989 | "Gridlock" / "Splendid Isolation" | Transverse City | Warren Zevon |
| 1991 | "Soap Box Preacher" | Storyville | Robbie Robertson |
| 1992 | "My Back Pages" (live) / "Knockin' On Heaven's Door" (live) | Bob Dylan: The 30th Anniversary Concert Celebration | various |
| 1992 | "Prairie Town" (electric) / "Prairie Town" (acoustic) | Any Road | Randy Bachman |
| 1992 | "You" / "Someday" / "Drunken Driver" | Crooked Line | Nils Lofgren |
| 1992 | various | Now and Then | Rusty Kershaw |
| 1993 | "Easy Answers" | Trios | Rob Wasserman and Bob Weir |
| 1994 | "Ambushin' Bastard" | Wish You Were Here Right Now | Bobby Charles |
| 1994 | produced album, appears on various tracks | Seven Gates: A Christmas Album (re-released as Christmas at the Ranch) | Ben Keith & Friends |
| 1995 | "Wrecking Ball" / "Sweet Old World" | Wrecking Ball | Emmylou Harris |
| 1995 | "I Got ID" / "The Long Road" | Merkinball | Pearl Jam |
| 1996 | "Made in Canada" | Merge | Randy Bachman |
| 1997 | "Alison" (live) / "Believe" (live) | The Bridge School Concerts Vol. 1 | Elvis Costello / Nils Lofgren |
| 1999 | "For a Dancer" / "Across the Border" | Western Wall: The Tucson Sessions | Linda Ronstadt and Emmylou Harris |
| 1999 | "Country Feedback (live) "/"Ambulance Blues" (live) | N/A | R.E.M. |
| 2001 | "Treaty" | Eagle Cries | Joanne Shenandoah |
| 2001 | "Houses" | Elyse (reissue) | Elyse Weinberg |
| 2001 | "The Long Road" | America: A Tribute to Heroes | various |
| 2002 | "Furry Sings the Blues" (live) | The Last Waltz (reissue) | The Band and Joni Mitchell |
| 2004 | various | Last Train to Memphis | Bobby Charles |
| 2005 | "Round the Bend" / "Different Man" | Man Alive! | Stephen Stills |
| 2005 | "Downtown" | Scratchy: The Complete Reprise Recordings | Crazy Horse |
| 2006 | "For What It's Worth" / "Sweet Old World" | The Bridge School Collection, Vol. 1 | Billy Idol / Emmylou Harris |
| 2006 | "Down by the River" | The Bridge School Collection, Vol. 2 | Elvis Costello |
| 2006 | "Climber" | Voyage | David Crosby |
| 2006 | "Cowboy Movie" (alternate mix) | Voyage (digital-only bonus track) | David Crosby |
| 2006 | "You Don't Have to Go" | Last Man Standing | Jerry Lee Lewis |
| 2006 | "Kind Woman" | The Heartbeat of Love | Richie Furay |
| 2007 | presumably all tracks | Pegi Young | Pegi Young and the Survivors |
| 2009 | various | Potato Hole | Booker T. Jones |
| 2009 | "Soldiers of Peace"/ "Heartland" / "Taken At All" ("Horses Through a Rainstorm") | Reflections | Graham Nash |
| 2009 | "Whole Lotta Shakin' Going On" (live) | The Bridge School Collection, Vol. 4 | Jerry Lee Lewis |
| 2010 | "Campfire Scene" | A Postcard from California | Al Jardine |
| 2010 | "A California Saga" | A Postcard from California | Al Jardine (with David Crosby and Stephen Stills) |
| 2010 | "Gone to Shiloh" | The Union | Elton John and Leon Russell |
| 2010 | "Starting Over" / "Side of the Road" / "Body Breaks" | Foul Deeds | Pegi Young and the Survivors |
| 2011 | "Lie" / "Number 9 Train" / "Doghouse" / "Song for a Baby Girl" | Bracing for Impact | Pegi Young and the Survivors |
| 2011 | "California Saga" | A Postcard From California | Al Jardine |
| 2011 | "Walk With Me" | Pearl Jam Twenty | Pearl Jam |
| 2011 | "Smile" / "Smile (Backing Track - Take 1)" | Instant Replay (reissue) | The Monkees |
| 2013 | "Black Coral" | Carry On | Stephen Stills |
| 2014 | "Down the Wrong Way" | Stockholm | Chrissie Hynde |
| 2014 | "Keith Don't Go" | Face the Music | Nils Lofgren |
| 2014 | "Don't Let Me Be Lonely" | Lonely in a Crowded Room | Pegi Young and the Survivors |
| 2014 | "Sail Away" / "Long May You Run" / "Whiskey River" | Willie Nelson and Friends Live at Third Man Records | Willie Nelson |
| 2014 | "Bright Lights, Big City" | Rock & Roll Time | Jerry Lee Lewis |
| 2014 | "Keith Don't Go" | Face the Music | Grin |
| 2015 | "Houses" | Greasepaint Smile | Elyse Weinberg |
| 2015 | "Kind Woman" | Hand in Hand | Richie Furay |
| 2015 | "Little Girl Lost" | Heavy Blues | Randy Bachman |
| 2016 | "San Francisco (Be Sure to Wear Some Flowers in Your Hair)" | Something Real | Lukas Nelson & Promise of the Real |
| 2019 | "Hungry Heart" (live) | Springsteen Bridge School | Bruce Springsteen (with Crosby, Stills and Nash, and Don Henley) |
| 2019 | "Cross Creek Road" | Threads | Sheryl Crow |
| 2019 | "I Just Wasn't Made for These Times" / "What's Happening" | Echo In The Canyon | Jakob Dylan |
| 2019 | "Turn Off the News (Build a Garden)" | N/A | Promise of the Real |
| 2020 | "Hey America" | N/A | Young Bob & the Peterboroughs |
| 2023 | "You Turn Me On, I'm a Radio" | Joni Mitchell Archives – Vol. 3: The Asylum Years (1972–1975) | Joni Mitchell |
| 2025 | "My Plane Leaves Tomorrow (Au Revoir)" | Islands in the Sun | Al Jardine (with Flea) |

== Filmography ==
=== Directed films (as Bernard Shakey) ===
| Year | Film | Notes |
|---|---|---|
| 1973 | Journey Through the Past | documentary featuring Neil Young |
| 1979 | Rust Never Sleeps | concert film featuring Neil Young & Crazy Horse |
| 1982 | Human Highway (with Dean Stockwell) | also actor |
| 1991 | Weld | concert video featuring Neil Young & Crazy Horse |
| 2003 | Greendale | features Neil Young & Crazy Horse |
| 2003 | Inside Greendale | documentary featuring Neil Young & Crazy Horse |
| 2007 | Live at Massey Hall 1971 | solo concert video |
| 2008 | CSNY/Déjà Vu (with Benjamin Johnson) | documentary featuring Crosby, Stills, Nash & Young |
| 2012 | A Day at the Gallery | also actor |
| 2015 | Muddy Track | documentary featuring Neil Young & Crazy Horse |
| 2019 | Mountaintop | documentary featuring Neil Young & Crazy Horse |
| 2020 | Return to Greendale | concert film featuring Neil Young & Crazy Horse |
| 2020 | Timeless Orpheum | solo documentary |
| 2021 | Young Shakespeare | solo concert video |
| 2022 | World Record: The Making Of − A Chronicle of the Music | documentary featuring Neil Young & Crazy Horse |
| 2022 | Harvest Time | documentary featuring Neil Young & the Stray Gators during the 1971 recording of Harvest |

=== Music videos ===
| Year | Song | Album | Director | Notes |
|---|---|---|---|---|
| 1983 | "Wonderin'" | Everybody's Rockin' | Tim Pope | |
| 1983 | "Cry Cry Cry" | Everybody's Rockin' | | |
| 1985 | "Are There Any More Real Cowboys?" | Old Ways | L.A. Johnson | |
| 1986 | "Weight of the World" | Landing on Water | Tim Pope | |
| 1986 | "Touch the Night" | Landing on Water | Tim Pope | |
| 1986 | "Pressure" | Landing on Water | Tim Pope | |
| 1986 | "People on the Street" | Landing on Water | Tim Pope | |
| 1988 | "This Note's for You" | This Note's for You | Julien Temple | 1989 MTV Video Music Award for Video of the Year |
| 1988 | "Hey Hey" | This Note's for You | Julien Temple | |
| 1989 | "Rockin' in the Free World" | Freedom | Julien Temple | |
| 1989 | "No More" | Freedom | Julien Temple | |
| 1990 | "Over and Over" | Ragged Glory | Julien Temple | |
| 1990 | "Mansion on the Hill" | Ragged Glory | Julien Temple | |
| 1990 | "Fuckin' Up" (Version 1) | Ragged Glory | Julien Temple | |
| 1990 | "Fuckin' Up" (Version 2) | Ragged Glory | Julien Temple | |
| 1990 | "Farmer John" | Ragged Glory | Julien Temple | |
| 1992 | "Harvest Moon" | Harvest Moon | Julien Temple | |
| 1992 | "Unknown Legend" | Harvest Moon | Julien Temple | |
| 1993 | "The Needle and the Damage Done" (Live) | Unplugged | Julien Temple | |
| 1993 | "Mr. Soul" (Live) | Unplugged | Julien Temple | |
| 1994 | "Change Your Mind" | Sleeps With Angels | | |
| 1994 | "Piece of Crap" | Sleeps With Angels | | |
| 1994 | "My Heart" | Sleeps With Angels | | |
| 1994 | "Prime of Life" | Sleeps With Angels | | |
| 1995 | "Downtown" | Mirror Ball | | |
| 1995 | "Peace and Love" | Mirror Ball | | |
| 1996 | "Big Time" | Broken Arrow | Jim Jarmusch | |
| 1996 | "This Town" | Broken Arrow | Tim Pope | |
| 2004 | "Rockin' in the Free World" (Fahrenheit 9/11 Mix) | Fahrenheit 9/11 | | |
| 2005 | "Falling Off the Face of the Earth" | Prairie Wind | | |
| 2006 | "Living with War" | Living with War | | |
| 2006 | "The Restless Consumer" | Living with War: "In the Beginning" | | |
| 2007 | "Helpless" (Live) | Live at Massey Hall 1971 | | |
| 2007 | "Ohio" (Live) | Live at Massey Hall 1971 | | |
| 2010 | "Love and War" | Le Noise | | |
| 2010 | "Hitchhiker" | Le Noise | | |
| 2012 | "Ramada Inn" | Psychedelic Pill | | |
| 2012 | "Born in Ontario" | Psychedelic Pill | | |
| 2012 | "Driftin' Back" | Psychedelic Pill | | |
| 2012 | "Psychedelic Pill" | Psychedelic Pill | | |
| 2012 | "She's Always Dancing" | Psychedelic Pill | | |
| 2014 | "Who's Gonna Stand Up" | Storytone | | |
| 2015 | "A Rock Star Bucks a Coffee Shop" | The Monsanto Years | | |
| 2015 | "Wolf Moon" | The Monsanto Years | | |
| 2017 | "My Pledge" | Peace Trail | David Braun | |
| 2017 | "Indian Givers" | Peace Trail | Brad Strickman | |
| 2017 | "Children of Destiny" | The Visitor | | |
| 2017 | "Already Great" | The Visitor | | |
| 2018 | "Almost Always" | The Visitor | Daryl Hannah | |
| 2018 | "Peace Trail" | Paradox | Daryl Hannah | |
| 2020 | "The Losing End" | Neil Young Archives Volume II: 1972–1976 | | |
| 2020 | "Shut it Down" | Colorado | | |
| 2020 | "Looking for a Leader 2020" | | | |
| 2020 | "Homegrown" (Barnyard Edition) | | | |
| 2020 | "Falling from Above" (Live) | Return to Greendale | | |
| 2020 | "Be the Rain" (Live) | Return to Greendale | | |
| 2020 | "Wonderin'" | After the Gold Rush (50th Anniversary Edition) | | |
| 2021 | "Pocahontas" | Neil Young Archives Volume II: 1972–1976 | | |
| 2021 | "Daughters" | Neil Young Archives Volume II: 1972–1976 | | |
| 2021 | "Don't Cry No Tears" (Live) | Way Down in the Rust Bucket | | |
| 2021 | "Homegrown" (Live) | Way Down in the Rust Bucket | | |
| 2021 | "Mansion on the Hill" (Live) | Way Down in the Rust Bucket | | |
| 2021 | "Down By the River" (Live) | Young Shakespeare | | |
| 2021 | "Cowgirl in the Sand" (Live) | Carnegie Hall 1970 | | |
| 2021 | "Welcome Back" | Barn | Daryl Hannah | |
| 2021 | "Heading West" | Barn | Daryl Hannah | |
| 2021 | "Don't Forget Love" | Barn | Daryl Hannah | |
| 2022 | "Love Earth" | World Record | Daryl Hannah | |
| 2022 | "Break the Chain" | World Record | Bernard Shakey | |
| 2022 | "Chevrolet" | World Record | | |
| 2022 | "Heart of Gold" (Live) | Harvest (50th Anniversary Edition) | | |
| 2022 | "Old Man" (Live) | Harvest (50th Anniversary Edition) | | |
| 2023 | "Chevrolet" (Radio edit) | World Record | | |
| 2023 | "Human Highway" (Live) | Somewhere Under the Rainbow | | |
| 2023 | "Stand for Peace" | | Daryl Hannah | |
| 2024 | "Thrasher" (Live) | Neil Young Archives Volume III: 1976–1987 | | |
| 2025 | "Pocahontas" (Live) | Neil Young Archives Volume III: 1976–1987 | | |
| 2025 | "big change" | Talkin to the Trees | | |
| 2025 | "When You Dance I Can Really Love" (Live) | Neil Young Archives Volume III: 1976–1987 | | |
| 2025 | "Let It Shine" (Live) | Neil Young Archives Volume III: 1976–1987 | | |
| 2025 | "Old Man" (Live) | Neil Young Archives Volume III: 1976–1987 | | |
| 2025 | "Let's Roll Again" | Talkin to the Trees | | |

=== Acting performances ===
- 1987 – Made in Heaven – as Truck Driver
- 1988 – '68 – as Westy
- 1990 – Love at Large – as Rick
- 2018 – Paradox – as The Man in the Black Hat

=== Documentary appearances ===
- 1978 – The Last Waltz ("Helpless" with The Band)
- 1983 – Neil Young in Berlin (concert film by Michael Lindsay-Hogg)
- 1984 – Solo Trans (concert film by Hal Ashby)
- 1985 – Live Aid (solo and with Crosby, Stills & Nash)
- 1989 – Freedom: A Live Acoustic Concert (filmed at Jones Beach and The Palladium, New York, September 5–6, 1989)
- 1991 – Neil Young & Crazy Horse: Ragged Glory (Ragged Glory music video compilation)
- 1993 – Bob Dylan: 30th Anniversary Concert Celebration ("Just Like Tom Thumb's Blues", "All Along the Watchtower", "My Back Pages" "Knockin' on Heaven's Door")
- 1993 – Neil Young Unplugged
- 1994 – Neil Young & Crazy Horse: The Complex Sessions (directed by Jonathan Demme)
- 1997 – Year of the Horse (documentary by Jim Jarmusch)
- 2000 – Neil Young: Silver and Gold
- 2000 – Neil Young: Red Rocks Live
- 2001 – America: A Tribute to Heroes ("Imagine")
- 2003 – Live at Vicar Street (concert film by Ned O'Hanlon)
- 2005 – Live 8 ("Four Strong Winds", "When God Made Me", "Rockin' in the Free World")
- 2006 – Neil Young: Heart of Gold (concert film by Jonathan Demme)
- 2009 – Neil Young: Trunk Show (concert film by Jonathan Demme)
- 2011 – Pearl Jam Twenty (documentary film by Cameron Crowe)
- 2011 – Neil Young Journeys (concert film by Jonathan Demme)
- 2011 – Neil Young: Don't Be Denied (BBC Four documentary)
- 2013 – Sound City (documentary by Dave Grohl)
- 2014 – A MusiCares Tribute to Bruce Springsteen ("Born in the U.S.A.")
- 2019 – Neil Young in London (concert film by Tim Pope)
- 2021 – Way Down in the Rust Bucket (concert film by L.A. Johnson)
- 2021 – Barn: A Band A Brotherhood A Barn (documentary by Daryl Hannah and Gary Ward)

== See also ==
- "Tears Are Not Enough" – single by Northern Lights
