= Before and After (Neil Young album) =

Live album by Neil Young
- Released: December 8, 2023
- Recorded: July 2023
- Venue: Various
- Genre: Folk rock
- Length: 47:58
- Label: Reprise
- Producer: Neil Young; Lou Adler

Neil Young chronology
Odeon Budokan (2023)	Before and After (2023)	Fuckin' Up (2024)

Singles from Before and After
- 1. "I'm the Ocean" / "Homefires" / "Burned" Released: October 20, 2023; 2. "On the Way Home" / "If You Got Love" / "A Dream that Can Last" Released: November 17, 2023

Before and After is a live album by Canadian-American singer-songwriter Neil Young. It was released on December 8, 2023, through Reprise. Consisting of 13 tracks, the album features solo acoustic re-recordings of some of his past songs. The album tracks were recorded during Young's 2023 Coastal Tour.

== Background and recording ==
Before and After was conceived by Young and Lou Adler, while mixing was handled by the former and Niko Bolas. It sees the singer-songwriter revisiting some of his back catalog, "a trip into his music history", with re-recordings that have them appear in a new guise. The album contains "eclectic" fresh takes on some of Young's lesser known tracks pulled from his vault. Previews of three songs, "I'm the Ocean", "Homefires", and "Burned", were released as an EP upon announcement of the album on October 20. Young spoke of the release as a unique experience where a "feeling is captured" and has to be listened to "as a whole piece". As a matter of fact, the project comprises one "uninterrupted 48-minute piece", referred to by Young as "a music montage with no beginnings or endings".

== Critical reception ==
Professional ratings
Aggregate scores
Source	Rating
Metacritic	80/100
Review scores
Source	Rating
AllMusic	3/5 stars
American Songwriter	3.5/5 stars
Classic Rock	3.5/5 stars
DIY	4/5 stars
The Guardian	4/5 stars
Mojo	4/5 stars
The Observer	4/5 stars
Record Collector	5/5 stars
Slant Magazine	4/5 stars
Uncut	8/10

Before and After received a score of 80 out of 100 on review aggregator Metacritic based on 11 critics' reviews, indicating "generally favorable" reception. Stephen Thomas Erlewine of AllMusic wrote that the album "isn't agitated or electric" as "the starkness of the arrangements helps draw attention to the distance between the origin of a song and Young's present", and Young's voice "doesn't sound fragile, yet his vocals display some age-related raggedness". Lee Zimmerman of American Songwriter opined that "the intimacy is obvious and revealing, as if the listener is eavesdropping on the artist at a particularly vulnerable moment" as they are "delivered in stripped-down settings that dramatically change the tone and tempo".

Uncut stated that "this is about consistency of themes and mood over time, reimagined by a man reckoning with his past and drawing new light to the deepest of cuts". Mojo felt that "here the stage show had the intimacy of Young's between-song chats, the intimacy here comes from the sensation that you're listening in on his thoughts as one song drifts, like memories do, from one tome to another". Writing for Classic Rock, Everett True felt that "the overall effect is hypnotic, mesmeric – a musical montage that has no start or end point".

Slant Magazine's Lewie Parkinson-Jones wrote that "the intimacy of the recordings emphasizes what Young was trying to achieve rather than obscures it" and its "idiosyncratic nature only makes it that much more appealing". Phil Mongredien of The Observer found that "'On the Way Home' loses some of the 1968 original's joyous momentum, but gains much in the way of emotional power. A more fragile and intimate-sounding 'Comes a Time' similarly benefits from its reinvention". The Guardian's Dave Simpson complimented the "gentle melodies" and commented that "while his voice has lost some of the old youthful power, it has gained in tenderness, nuance, humanity and warmth". James Hickey of DIY judged that the "songs are rarely improved upon, with the fidelity to ruggedness giving the songs the feel of half-finished demos, but the songwriting itself is, of course, stellar".

== Track listing ==
All tracks are written by Neil Young.

Before and After track listing
No.	Title	Originally appeared on	Length
1.	"I'm the Ocean"	Mirror Ball	6:44
2.	"Homefires"	Neil Young Archives Volume II: 1972–1976	2:04
3.	"Burned"	Buffalo Springfield	2:06
4.	"On the Way Home"	Last Time Around	3:14
5.	"If You Got Love"	previously unreleased; originally recorded for Trans	3:32
6.	"A Dream That Can Last"	Sleeps with Angels	4:32
7.	"Birds"	After the Gold Rush	2:47
8.	"My Heart"	Sleeps with Angels	3:01
9.	"When I Hold You in My Arms"	Are You Passionate?	5:23
10.	"Mother Earth"	Ragged Glory	3:43
11.	"Mr. Soul"	Buffalo Springfield Again	3:42
12.	"Comes a Time"	Comes a Time	3:20
13.	"Don't Forget Love"	Barn	3:41
Total length:			47:58

== Personnel ==
- Neil Young – vocals, guitar, harmonica, piano, pump organ, production, mixing
- Lou Adler – production
- Chris Bellman – mastering
- Niko Bolas – mixing
- CW Alkire – engineering
- Tom Mulligan – recording
- Howard Frank – production assistance
- Mark Humphrey – monitor engineering
- Eliot Howerton – technician
- John Hausmann – technician
- Jeff Pinn – backline technician, guitar technician
- Jeff Tweedy – backline technician, guitar technician
- Bob Rice – vibraphone (track 8), piano (9)

== Charts ==
Chart performance for Before and After
Chart (2023–2024)	Peak position
Austrian Albums (Ö3 Austria)	43
Belgian Albums (Ultratop Flanders)	76
Belgian Albums (Ultratop Wallonia)	113
Dutch Albums (Album Top 100)	50
French Albums (SNEP)	126
German Albums (Offizielle Top 100)	29
Hungarian Albums (MAHASZ)	39
Scottish Albums (OCC)	30
Swiss Albums (Schweizer Hitparade)	22
UK Album Downloads (OCC)	25
US Top Album Sales (Billboard)	35
US Americana/Folk Albums (Billboard)	20
US Top Current Album Sales (Billboard)	24
US Indie Store Album Sales (Billboard)	5
