= World Record (Neil Young and Crazy Horse album) =

Studio album by Neil Young and Crazy Horse
- Released: November 18, 2022
- Recorded: May 2 – 11, 2022
- Studios: Shangri-La, Malibu, California
- Genre: Folk rock
- Length: 46:38; 44:57 (vinyl)
- Label: Reprise
- Producers: Neil Young; Rick Rubin

Neil Young chronology
Noise & Flowers (2022)	World Record (2022)	Chrome Dreams (2023)

Crazy Horse chronology
Toast (2022)	World Record (2022)	Chrome Dreams (2023)

Singles from World Record
- 1. "Love Earth" Released: October 1, 2022; 2. "Break the Chain" Released: October 21, 2022; 3. "Chevrolet (Radio Edit)" Released: January 23, 2023

World Record is the forty-fifth studio album by Canadian-American singer-songwriter Neil Young and his 15th with Crazy Horse, released on November 18, 2022, through Reprise Records. The album was produced by Young and Rick Rubin, and preceded by the lead single "Love Earth".

== Writing ==
World Record's lyrical content concerns Young "reminisc[ing] with gratitude about the gifts the Earth has given him" as well as the "state of Earth" and "its uncertain future", as well as "Chevrolet", a song about "Young's relationship with cars". Several of the songs, including the lead single "Love Earth", were written while taking long walks in the woods around Young's Colorado home. He explains, "I was whistling it in the forest, that melody. And I recorded it on a flip phone. And I put it on my computer, and months later I wrote the song, just after hearing me whistle the melody, walking along through the forest. So that's how I got that song, and seven or eight others that are on this record. I was just walking."

"Love Earth" is inspired by Young's admiration for the planet, and his concerns about climate change. "This Old Planet" also deals with climate change, and a longing for earlier times when the planet was healthier, while "Break the Chain" was inspired by the early days of the COVID-19 pandemic.

While most of the songs on the album deal with world events from COVID to war to climate change, the longest song on the album, "Chevrolet" relates a series of life events experienced from within an automobile. Young wrote the song on piano while living in a remote cabin, and it features a more complex structure than many of his other long songs he has written throughout his career. He continues with Tom Power: "It's got a very complex structure to it - much more complex than any of my other songs that are long songs like "Cowgirl" or "Down by the River" or "Love and Only Love". [...] But the song itself about the car, and not just about the car, but all the cars that have been there. They've taken me from place to place through things in my life – that came to me while writing that song. Monumental parts of my life. And now as much as I love that, I need to be thinking about the world. So I can't drive those cars anymore."

== Recording ==
The album was recorded live and mixed to analog tape at Rick Rubin's Shangri-La studio in Malibu, California. It was completed in July 2022 with its release delayed to "properly release" the album in "quality" form on vinyl. The album marks the first released collaboration between Young and Rubin. The duo had previously attempted to record together in 1997, but the sessions did not result in an album. Young had previously recorded the albums Peace Trail and The Visitor at Rubin's Shangri-La studios and the duo performed interviews together prior to the sessions for World Record.

Lofgren explains how having an outside producer made World Record different from Colorado and Barn: "The idea of using a producer means turning over control. That's not something in Neil's nature. He used Rick as a guide. It was never like, 'You've got to do it this way.' That's just not going to work with Neil, and Rick knows that. But he would sometimes say things like, 'Why don't you try that one on acoustic guitar?' or 'Try going down a different road on this one.' At times, it allowed Neil to show up and just be a singer and guitar player."

Young reached out to his longtime collaborators Crazy Horse to record the album as he wrote a fresh batch of songs. Lofgren recalls, "Neil reached out to us and was like, 'Hey, I've got two or three songs; When I get a batch, we'll record again. Maybe in the summer.' Sessions were moved up to May once Young wrote new material faster than anticipated. Lofgren continues, "I went, 'May 1?' That's not summer. That's a week and a half away!'"

Young noted that the album is unlike 2021's Barn, and contains "unheard of combinations of instruments". The fact the songs were written while whistling meant that Young and the group had more freedom to choose instrumentation for each of the songs while recording. Lofgren spent the night during the sessions on site at Shangri-La, just outside the studio, giving him the ability to experiment with additional instruments and sounds for the album. On "I Walk with You (Earth Ringtone)", he plays pedal-steel guitar.

Young and Rubin employed a mix of analog and digital technology to record and mix the album. Young called it "a hybrid. This was done to tape and immediately to digital, so it was only on tape for a split second and then it was digital. But we still have the original tape. So then after that we're working with the digital copy of it."

== Album cover ==
The album cover is a photograph of Young's father, the journalist Scott Young, with his date of birth printed next to it in the style of a dossier. Inside the album are pictures of his mother, brother, and sister with their dates of birth. The cover image dates from the 1950s. Young explains "I think that was taken in the fifties, probably Toronto. My dad was working for the Toronto Globe and Mail at the time. He's just walking down the street. It's a great picture of him. There's somebody who knows where they're going!"

== Release ==
The album was released on three-sided 2-LP to "optimize audio quality" with an etching on the remaining side, along with CD, cassette, and for streaming and download. CD copies include tracks 1–9 on disc one, and tracks 10 and 11 on disc two.

== Critical reception ==
Professional ratings
Aggregate scores
Source	Rating
Metacritic	75/100
Review scores
Source	Rating
AllMusic	4/5 stars
Christgau’s Consumer Guide	B+
Clash	8/10
Classic Rock	4.5/5 stars
Exclaim!	7/10
Paste	6.8/10
Pitchfork	7.1/10
The Telegraph	4/5 stars
Uncut	4/5 stars
Under the Radar	7.5/10

On review aggregator Metacritic, World Record has a score of 75 out of 100 based on seven critics' reviews, indicating "generally favorable" reception. Reviews from Mojo and Uncut noted the presence of background harmonies, keyboards and pump organ, which are uncharacteristic of Young and Crazy Horse's previous output. Fred Thomas of AllMusic also acclaimed Rubin's "muscular and often barnstorming production", which he found "lends itself unexpectedly well to the off-the-cuff recording method, pushing Young's vocals to the front of the mixes but making lots of space for the songs to breathe".

Michael Gallucci of Ultimate Classic Rock felt that while the album "doesn't go too deep" and "can be messy and often unfocused", "Young and Crazy Horse's allegiance to the material and themselves leads them to do what they've always done best: plugging in, following the leader and having a blast for 45 or so minutes". Reviewing the album for Exclaim!, Daniel Sylvester wrote that while "on paper [it is] a middle-of-the-pack Neil Young & Crazy Horse album", "it's filled with so much personality and passion that it begs to be remembered as one of his most soul-bearing".

Pat King of Paste opined that the songs on World Record "come off feeling like an unflinching and unfiltered plea for our dying planet. When they don't click, though, the songs just feel unsubtle and unpracticed in their performance and messaging". Writing for Under the Radar, Michael James Hall described the album as "a call to protest and a call to action delivered through a series of rough and tumble recordings", concluding that "even if [it] has neither the reach nor the presentation it might need to have a real impact, its heartfelt racket at least draws attention to itself and, consequently, to the action it begs us to take".

== Track listing ==
World Record track listing
No.	Title	Length
1.	"Love Earth"	4:03
2.	"Overhead"	3:40
3.	"I Walk with You (Earth Ringtone)"	3:57
4.	"This Old Planet (Changing Days)"	2:30
5.	"The World (Is in Trouble Now)"	3:15
6.	"Break the Chain"	4:07
7.	"The Long Day Before"	2:18
8.	"Walkin' on the Road (To the Future)"	2:57
9.	"The Wonder Won't Wait"	3:17
10.	"Chevrolet"	15:15
11.	"This Old Planet (Reprise)"	1:19
Total length:		46:38

== Personnel ==
- Neil Young – lead vocals (1–11), upright piano (1, 2, 4, 8, 10), kick tub drum (1, 3, 5), Marxophone and vibes (2), harmonica (2, 5, 7–9), guitar (3, 6, 10), pump organ (5, 7–9), Wurlitzer electric piano (11)

Crazy Horse

- Nils Lofgren – lap steel guitar (1), slide guitar (2), pedal steel guitar (3, 7), accordion (4), guitar (5, 10), bottleneck guitar (6), acoustic guitar and muted upright piano (8), dobro and percussion (9), vocals (1–10)
- Billy Talbot – bass guitar and vocals (1–10)
- Ralph Molina – drums and vocals (1–10)

Technical

- Rick Rubin – producer
- Neil Young – producer
- Ryan Hewitt – engineer, mixer
- Louis Remenapp – assistant engineer
- Taylor Jackson – assistant engineer

== Charts ==
Chart performance for World Record
Chart (2022)	Peak position
Australian Digital Albums (ARIA)	10
Austrian Albums (Ö3 Austria)	20
Belgian Albums (Ultratop Flanders)	18
Belgian Albums (Ultratop Wallonia)	28
Dutch Albums (Album Top 100)	31
Finnish Albums (Suomen virallinen lista)	42
French Albums (SNEP)	51
German Albums (Offizielle Top 100)	5
Italian Albums (FIMI)	69
Japanese Hot Albums (Billboard Japan)	90
Portuguese Albums (AFP)	27
Scottish Albums (Official Charts)	15
Spanish Albums (Promusicae)	59
Swedish Albums (Sverigetopplistan)	47
Swiss Albums (Schweizer Hitparade)	10
UK Albums (Official Charts)	45
US Americana/Folk Albums (Billboard)	10
US Top Album Sales (Billboard)	34
US Top Current Album Sales (Billboard)	23
US Indie Store Album Sales (Billboard)	14
