= Return to Greendale =

Live album by Neil Young and Crazy Horse
- Released: November 6, 2020
- Recorded: September 4, 2003
- Venue: The Air Canada Centre, Toronto, Ontario, Canada
- Genre: Rock
- Length: 80:36
- Label: Warner
- Producer: Neil Young; L.A. Johnson

Neil Young chronology
The Times (2020)	Return to Greendale (2020)	Neil Young Archives Volume II: 1972–1976 (2020)

Crazy Horse chronology
Colorado (2019)	Return to Greendale (2020)	Way Down in the Rust Bucket (2021)

Archives Performance Series chronology
PS12: Dreamin' Man Live '92 (2009)	PS16: Return to Greendale (2020)	PS21: Noise & Flowers (2022)

Singles from Return to Greendale
- 1. "Falling From Above" Released: October 2, 2020; 2. "Bandit" Released: October 22, 2020

Return to Greendale is a live album from American-Canadian folk rock musician Neil Young and American rock band Crazy Horse recorded in 2003 while touring to promote the album Greendale.

== Recording and release ==
Young announced the Greendale Live album on his website on January 1, 2020 with the intention to release it in the year, alongside Way Down in the Rust Bucket, a 1990 recording of his tour with Crazy Horse supporting Ragged Glory. The album was initially announced for release on June 19 before being delayed until its release on November 6. A concert film edition was screened in San Francisco and via the Movietone section of Neil Young's Archives website. On September 25, Young revealed that the album would be released on compact disc, vinyl LP, and the concert film edition on Blu-ray and DVD with the documentary Inside Greendale.

== Track listing ==
Disc one
No.	Title	Length
1.	"Falling From Above"	7:42
2.	"Double E"	5:32
3.	"Devil's Sidewalk"	6:23
4.	"Leave The Driving"	6:34
5.	"Carmichael"	10:40
6.	"Bandit"	6:35

Disc two
No.	Title	Length
1.	"Grandpa's Interview"	13:24
2.	"Bringin' Down Dinner"	3:17
3.	"Sun Green"	12:19
4.	"Be The Rain"	8:20

== Personnel ==
Neil Young and Crazy Horse

- Ralph Molina – drums, vocals
- Billy Talbot – bass guitar, vocals
- Frank "Poncho" Sampedro – Wurlitzer electric piano
- Neil Young – guitar, organ, harmonica, vocals, art direction, design

Additional personnel

- Chris Bellman – mastering at Grundman Mastering
- Gabe Burch – mixing assistance on "Bandit"
- dhlovelife – art direction and design
- John Hanlon – editing and mixing on "Bandit" at The Village and master transfer assembly
- John Hausmann – mixing assistance, except on "Bandit"
- James Mazzeo – illustration
- The Mountainettes (Twink Brewer, Nancy Hall, Susan Hall, Pegi Young) – backing vocals
- Tim Mulligan – editing and mixing at Redwood Digital, except on "Bandit"
- John Nowland – mixing assistance
- Harry Sitam – technical support

== Charts ==
Chart performance for Return to Greendale
Chart (2020)	Peak position
Austrian Albums (Ö3 Austria)	20
Belgian Albums (Ultratop Flanders)	92
Belgian Albums (Ultratop Wallonia)	58
Dutch Albums (Album Top 100)	67
Finnish Albums (Suomen virallinen lista)	47
German Albums (Offizielle Top 100)	15
Hungarian Albums (MAHASZ)	10
Scottish Albums (OCC)	27
Spanish Albums (Promusicae)	39
US Top Album Sales (Billboard)	42
US Americana/Folk Albums (Billboard)	18
US Top Current Album Sales (Billboard)	30
US Indie Store Album Sales (Billboard)	6
