= Noise & Flowers =

Live album by Neil Young and Promise of the Real
- Released: August 5, 2022
- Recorded: July 2 – 14, 2019
- Venue: Various
- Genre: Rock
- Length: 74:46
- Label: Reprise
- Producer: Neil Young; Niko Bolas

Neil Young chronology
Toast (2022)	Noise & Flowers (2022)	World Record (2022)

Archives Performance Series chronology
PS16: Return to Greendale (2020)	PS21: Noise & Flowers (2022)	PS22: Coastal: The Soundtrack (2025)

Singles from Noise & Flowers
- 1. "From Hank to Hendrix" Released: June 24, 2022

Noise & Flowers is a live album by Neil Young and Promise of the Real. It was released through Reprise Records on August 5, 2022, and recorded during the band's 2019 European tour.

== Critical reception ==
Professional ratings
Aggregate scores
Source	Rating
Metacritic	78/100
Review scores
Source	Rating
AllMusic	3.5/5 stars
American Songwriter	4/5 stars
Clash	9/10
Classic Rock	3.5/5 stars
Mojo	4/5 stars
Tom Hull – on the Web	B+
Uncut	7/10

Nick Roseblade of Clash called Noise & Flowers "a greatest hits selection worthy of [manager] Elliot Roberts' 50-year friendship with Neil Young" and "one of Neil Young's best live DVDs and one that should delight both old and new fans of his work".

== Track listing ==
Noise & Flowers track listing
No.	Title	Recording Date and Location	Length
1.	"Mr. Soul"	July 3, 2019, Waldbühne, Berlin, Germany	4:33
2.	"Everybody Knows This Is Nowhere"	July 3, 2019, Waldbühne, Berlin, Germany	2:46
3.	"Helpless"	July 3, 2019, Waldbühne, Berlin, Germany	5:22
4.	"Field of Opportunity"	July 3, 2019, Waldbühne, Berlin, Germany	4:17
5.	"Alabama"	July 12, 2019, Hyde Park, London, England	4:14
6.	"Throw Your Hatred Down"	July 14, 2019, Nowlan Park, Kilkenny, Ireland	8:59
7.	"Rockin' in the Free World"	July 3, 2019, Waldbühne, Berlin, Germany	9:59
8.	"Comes a Time"	July 2, 2019, Filmnächte am Elbufer, Dresden, Germany	3:19
9.	"From Hank to Hendrix"	July 9, 2019, Sportpaleis, Antwerp, Belgium	5:07
10.	"On the Beach"	July 9, 2019, Sportpaleis, Antwerp, Belgium	7:35
11.	"Are You Ready for the Country?"	July 9, 2019, Sportpaleis, Antwerp, Belgium	3:15
12.	"I've Been Waiting for You"	July 10, 2019, Ziggo Dome, Amsterdam, the Netherlands	3:52
13.	"Winterlong"	July 5, 2019, SAP Arena, Mannheim, Germany	4:11
14.	"Fuckin' Up"	July 6, 2019, Olympiahalle, Munich, Germany	7:17
Total length:			74:46

== Personnel ==
- Neil Young – guitar, piano, harmonica, vocals
- Lukas Nelson – guitar, vocals
- Micah Nelson – Wurlitzer, stringman, piano, guitar, vocals
- Anthony LoGerfo – drums
- Corey McCormick – bass, vocals
- Tato Melgar – percussion

Additional roles

- Daryl Hannah – creative director, art
- Aaron Huey – art
- Adam CK Vollick – art
- Jay Blakesberg – photography
- Joey Martinez – photography
- Jenice Heo – art direction
- Tim Mulligan – engineering

== Charts ==
Chart performance for Noise & Flowers
Chart (2022)	Peak position
Australian Digital Albums (ARIA)	38
Australian Physical Albums (ARIA)	85
Austrian Albums (Ö3 Austria)	23
Belgian Albums (Ultratop Flanders)	12
Belgian Albums (Ultratop Wallonia)	30
Dutch Albums (Album Top 100)	16
French Albums (SNEP)	101
German Albums (Offizielle Top 100)	7
Portuguese Albums (AFP)	22
Scottish Albums (OCC)	4
Spanish Albums (Promusicae)	42
Swiss Albums (Schweizer Hitparade)	29
UK Albums (OCC)	44
US Top Album Sales (Billboard)	23
US Americana/Folk Albums (Billboard)	9
US Top Current Album Sales (Billboard)	20
US Indie Store Album Sales (Billboard)	12
