= Way Down in the Rust Bucket =

Live album by Neil Young and Crazy Horse
- Released: February 26, 2021
- Recorded: November 13, 1990
- Venue: The Catalyst, Santa Cruz, California, United States
- Genre: Hard rock
- Length: 142:37
- Label: Reprise
- Producer: Neil Young; David Briggs

Neil Young chronology
Neil Young Archives Volume II: 1972–1976 (2020)	Way Down in the Rust Bucket (2021)	Young Shakespeare (2021)

Crazy Horse chronology
Return to Greendale (2020)	Way Down in the Rust Bucket (2021)	Barn (2021)

Archives Performance Series chronology
PS11: Bluenote Café (2015)	PS11.5: Way Down in the Rust Bucket (2021)	PS12: Dreamin' Man Live '92 (2009)

CD cover

Singles from Way Down in the Rust Bucket
- 1. "Country Home" Released: February 16, 2021; 2. "Don't Cry No Tears" Released: February 16, 2021; 3. "Homegrown" Released: February 19, 2021

Way Down in the Rust Bucket is a live album and concert film from Canadian-American rock musician Neil Young and his band Crazy Horse, released on February 26, 2021. It is Volume 11.5 in the Performance Series of Neil Young Archives.

== Recording and release ==
The album was recorded on November 13, 1990, at The Catalyst in Santa Cruz, California, where the band was warming up for their upcoming Ragged Glory tour. The show consisted of three sets and an encore, featuring most of the recently released Ragged Glory as well as older fan favorites and deeper cuts. Guitarist Poncho Sampedro remembers the show fondly in a March 2021 interview for Rolling Stone:

"Let me go on record as saying that I think this Way Down in the Rust Bucket is the best Crazy Horse record we ever recorded. I love it! I love this record. Neil plays great, unbelievably great. He's just electrified. "Country Home" sounds like a country tune I never heard in my life. He just takes it to all kinds of different levels. He nails "Cortez." He nails "Danger Bird" and "Over and Over." He's just playing so good and the band played really good. We'd go onstage and we played "T-Bone". We'd played that song at a birthday party for one of Pegi's friends and then we played it there. We never played it too many other places. It was just fun. We played "Homegrown," and at the end, people were throwing weed on the stage since it's a big weed-growing community. We were having fun. It was all about the beginning of a new era. We were becoming alive. I just don't see it as a warm-up. It doesn't hit me like that. We played "Cortez" and it sounds so beautiful. When I hear Neil play it with other people, it just doesn't sound the same to me, ever."

Due to a temporary power loss, the multitrack recording of "Cowgirl in the Sand" was damaged; it was decided to remove the song from the CD and LP running order (which also allowed the release format to be limited to two CDs/four LPs). "Cowgirl in the Sand" appears only on the DVD version, with dropout sections augmented by lower-fidelity FOH mix.

Young announced the release on his site on January 1, 2020, with the intention to release it that year along with Greendale Live, which was later retitled Return to Greendale, a 2003 rock opera that also features Crazy Horse. This album was initially scheduled to come out on October 16, 2020, before being postponed to January 15, 2021 and later February 26. Young has previously shown all the concert video footage of this show as part of the Movietone section of his Archives website.

== Critical reception ==
Professional ratings
Aggregate scores
Source	Rating
Metacritic	85/100
Review scores
Source	Rating
AllMusic	4/5 stars
And It Don't Stop	A−
Clash	9/10
Rolling Stone	3.5/5 stars
Tom Hull – on the Web	B+

Way Down in the Rust Bucket was met with acclaim from critics. At Metacritic, which assigns a weighted average rating out of 100 to reviews from mainstream publications, this release received an average score of 85 based on 7 reviews.

== Track listing ==
All songs written by Neil Young except as noted.

Disc one
No.	Title	Writer(s)	Length
1.	"Country Home"		9:13
2.	"Surfer Joe and Moe the Sleaze"	Neil Young, Frank "Poncho" Sampedro	5:40
3.	"Love to Burn"		13:54
4.	"Days That Used to Be"		4:56
5.	"Bite the Bullet"		3:58
6.	"Cinnamon Girl"		4:04
7.	"Farmer John"	Don Harris, Dewey Terry	6:01
8.	"Over and Over"		10:20
9.	"Danger Bird"		10:26
10.	"Don’t Cry No Tears"		4:22
11.	"Sedan Delivery"		5:44

Disc two
No.	Title	Writer(s)	Length
1.	"Roll Another Number (For the Road)"		4:45
2.	"Fuckin’ Up"	Neil Young, Frank "Poncho" Sampedro	5:12
3.	"T-Bone"		6:44
4.	"Homegrown"		4:46
5.	"Mansion on the Hill"		5:58
6.	"Like a Hurricane"		12:56
7.	"Love and Only Love"		13:16
8.	"Cortez the Killer"		11:24

=== DVD ===
- "Country Home"
- "Surfer Joe and Moe the Sleaze"
- "Love to Burn"
- "Days That Used to Be"
- "Bite the Bullet"
- "Cinnamon Girl"
- "Farmer John"
- "Cowgirl in the Sand"
- "Over and Over"
- "Danger Bird"
- "Don't Cry No Tears"
- "Sedan Delivery"
- "Roll Another Number (For the Road)"
- "Fuckin' Up"
- "T-Bone"
- "Homegrown"
- "Mansion on the Hill"
- "Like a Hurricane"
- "Love and Only Love"
- "Cortez the Killer"

== Personnel ==
Neil Young and Crazy Horse

- Neil Young – vocals, guitar
- Ralph Molina – drums, vocals
- Frank Sampedro – guitar, Stringman, vocals
- Billy Talbot – bass guitar, vocals

Engineering and production

- Neil Young, David Briggs – production
- John Hanlon – recording, mixing
- Jenice Heo – art direction & design
- Frank Gironda – direction

== Charts ==
Chart performance for Way Down in the Rust Bucket
Chart (2021)	Peak position
Austrian Albums (Ö3 Austria)	9
Belgian Albums (Ultratop Flanders)	19
Belgian Albums (Ultratop Wallonia)	12
Croatian International Albums (HDU)	1
Danish Albums (Hitlisten)	35
Dutch Albums (Album Top 100)	45
Finnish Albums (Suomen virallinen lista)	32
French Albums (SNEP)	99
German Albums (Offizielle Top 100)	7
Hungarian Albums (MAHASZ)	5
Irish Albums (OCC)	27
Norwegian Albums (VG-lista)	24
Spanish Albums (Promusicae)	17
Swedish Albums (Sverigetopplistan)	34
Swiss Albums (Schweizer Hitparade)	18
UK Albums (OCC)	18
US Billboard 200	109
US Americana/Folk Albums (Billboard)	5
US Top Rock Albums (Billboard)	15
US Indie Store Album Sales (Billboard)	4
