= Second Song =

Studio album by Neil Young and the Chrome Hearts
- Released: September 18, 2026
- Studios: Shangri La, Malibu
- Length: 42:15
- Label: Reprise
- Producers: Lou Adler; Niko Bolas; Neil Young

Neil Young and the Chrome Hearts chronology
Talkin to the Trees (2025)	Second Song (2026)

Singles from Second Song
- 1. "Second Song" Released: August 7, 2026

Second Song is the fiftieth studio album by Neil Young, released on September 18, 2026, by Reprise Records. Recorded at Shangri La in Malibu and produced by Lou Adler, it is his second album recorded with his band the Chrome Hearts. It follows Young's previous album Talkin' to the Trees, also produced by Adler and recorded at Shangri La. The first single, the title track, released on August 7, runs for nearly 11 and a half minutes long.

== Background and release ==
Second Song contains "Casting Me Away from You" and "I'll Love You Forever", both written sometime in the 1960s that went unreleased until Second Song. According to a press release, Second Song is primarily an acoustic album. According to Andy Greene of Rolling Stone, the title track is about "the passage of time and the need for human connection." Neil Young said of the album: "I'm in the studio recording a new album with the Chrome Hearts. I love the songs and the feelings of life and love. Music is. So far we have eight new songs. They make me feel". The album was released on September 18, 2026, on Reprise Records.

== Critical reception ==
Professional ratings
Review scores
Source	Rating
AllMusic	3.5/5 stars
Robert Christgau	A+
Pitchfork	7.7/10

Any Decent Music gave the album a weighted average score of 7.6 out of 10 from nine critic scores. According to Metacritic, it received "generally favorable" reviews based on a weighted average score of 80 out of 100 from eight critic scores.

== Track listing ==
All tracks are written by Neil Young.

Second Song track listing
No.	Title	Length
1.	"The Foggy Edge of Time"	4:05
2.	"Day After Day"	7:03
3.	"Earth Girl"	3:31
4.	"Second Song"	11:15
5.	"Casting Me Away from You"	2:38
6.	"Soon I Might Be Going"	9:14
7.	"I'll Love You Forever"	4:29
Total length:		42:15

== Personnel ==
Credits are adapted from Tidal.

=== Neil Young and the Chrome Hearts ===
- Neil Young – vocals, production (all tracks); vibes (tracks 2–4), acoustic guitar (2, 4, 5, 7); Marxophone, Mellotron, piano (1, 3); harmonica (4, 5), electric guitar (6)
- Anthony LoGerfo – drums, associate production (all tracks); vocals (3, 4), percussion (4–6)
- Corey McCormick – upright bass (all tracks), vocals (1–4, 7), electric bass guitar (4)
- Micah Nelson – vocals (1–4, 7), electric guitar (1–3, 5–7), dulcimer (4)
- Spooner Oldham – Hammond B3 organ (1, 3, 4, 6, 7), Mellotron (1), Farfisa organ (2, 5, 6), piano (2), pump organ (3), vibes (7)

=== Technical ===
- Lou Adler – production
- Niko Bolas – production
- Manny Adler – associate production
- John Hanlon – engineering, recording, mixing
- Mark Humphreys – monitor engineering
- Emily Paalman – engineering assistance
- Nick Hodges – engineering assistance
- Pedro Laet – engineering assistance
- Sofia Staedler – engineering assistance
- Taylor Goss – engineering assistance
- Jon Tan – Pro Tools
- Louis Remenapp – tape operation
- Chris Bellman – mastering
- Jeff Pinn – backline technician
- Greg Back – bass technician, guitar technician
- Jarrett Borba – drum technician
- Bob Rice – guitar technician
- Jeff Tweedy – guitar technician
- Marcus Douglas – sound technician

== Charts ==
Chart performance for Second Song
Chart (2026)	Peak position
Austrian Albums (Ö3 Austria)	52
Belgian Albums (Ultratop Flanders)	33
Belgian Albums (Ultratop Wallonia)	87
Croatian International Albums (HDU)	7
Danish Vinyl Albums (Hitlisten)	10
Dutch Albums (Album Top 100)	37
Finnish Physical Albums (Suomen virallinen lista)	10
French Rock & Metal Albums (SNEP)	43
German Albums (Offizielle Top 100)	18
German Rock & Metal Albums (Offizielle Top 100)	7
Greek Albums (IFPI)	100
Norwegian Physical Albums (IFPI Norge)	2
Swedish Physical Albums (Sverigetopplistan)	9
Scottish Albums (Official Charts)	23
Swiss Albums (Schweizer Hitparade)	18
UK Albums Sales (Official Charts)	27
UK Americana Albums (Official Charts)	4
US Top Album Sales (Billboard)	29
