= Neil Young: Silver and Gold =

Neil Young: Silver & Gold

Video by Neil Young
- Released: June 15, 2000
- Venue: Bass Concert Hall, Austin, Texas
- Genre: Acoustic rock
- Length: 62 minutes
- Label: Shakey Pictures
- Director: L.A. Johnson
- Producer: L.A. Johnson

Professional ratings
Review scores
Source	Rating
Allmusic	3/5 stars

Neil Young: Silver & Gold is a live video by Neil Young performing solo on acoustic guitar and piano. All but the last song were performed at Austin, Texas' Bass Concert Hall during his 1999 solo acoustic tour. The album largely consists of live performances of songs from Silver and Gold and CSNY's Looking Forward, his most recent studio releases.

== Track listing ==
1. "Intro"
2. "Looking Forward"
3. "Out of Control"
4. "Buffalo Springfield Again"
5. "Philadelphia"
6. "Daddy Went Walkin'"
7. "Distant Camera"
8. "Red Sun"
9. "Long May You Run"
10. "Harvest Moon"
11. "The Great Divide"
12. "Slowpoke"
13. "Good to See You"
14. "Silver & Gold"
