= CSNY/Déjà Vu =

2008 film by Neil Young

- Theatrical release poster
- Directed by: Benjamin Johnson; Neil Young (as Bernard Shakey)
- Written by: Neil Young; Mike Cerre
- Produced by: L.A. Johnson
- Starring: David Crosby; Graham Nash; Stephen Stills; Neil Young; Mike Cerre; Stephen Colbert
- Cinematography: Mike Elwell
- Edited by: Mark Faulkner
- Production companies: Shangri-La Entertainment; Shakey Pictures
- Distributed by: Roadside Attractions
- Release dates: January 25, 2008 (Sundance Film Festival); July 25, 2008 (United States)
- Running time: 96 minutes
- Country: United States
- Language: English

CSNY/Déjà Vu is a 2008 documentary film directed by Neil Young (credited under the pseudonym Bernard Shakey) and Benjamin Johnson. It focuses on the career of Crosby, Stills, Nash & Young, its musical connection to its audience and the turbulent times with which its music is associated as the band goes on their 2006 Freedom of Speech tour.

It was shown as the closing film of the 2008 Sundance Film Festival.

Metrodome Distribution released CSNY/Déjà Vu on DVD in the UK on September 29, 2008. The DVD also features an exclusive interview with Neil Young and all ten Living with War music videos.
