= Talkin to the Trees =

Studio album by Neil Young and the Chrome Hearts
- Released: June 13, 2025
- Recorded: October 21–22, 2024; November 17, 2024
- Studios: Shangri La, Malibu
- Length: 37:57
- Labels: The Other Shoe; Reprise
- Producers: Lou Adler; Neil Young

Neil Young chronology
Coastal: The Soundtrack (2025)	Talkin to the Trees (2025)	Second Song (2026)

Singles from Talkin to the Trees
- 1. "Big Change" Released: January 17, 2025; 2. "Lets Roll Again" Released: May 2, 2025

Talkin to the Trees is the forty-ninth studio album by Neil Young. It was released on June 13, 2025, through The Other Shoe Productions and Reprise Records.

== Critical reception ==
Professional ratings
Aggregate scores
Source	Rating
Metacritic	71/100
Review scores
Source	Rating
AllMusic	3.5/5 stars
The Arts Desk	4/5 stars
Classic Rock	3.5/5 stars
The Independent	3/5 stars
The Line of Best Fit	7/10
Mojo	4/5 stars
Paste	6.8/10
Rolling Stone	3/5 stars
The Telegraph	4/5 stars
Uncut	3.5/5 stars

On review aggregator Metacritic, Talkin to the Trees has a score of 71 out of 100 based on eleven critics' reviews, indicating "generally favorable" reception.

A review from Mojo describes the album as a "simple [pleasure], a port in the storm in these troubled times," while also acknowledging jarring detours on the bluesy garage rock track "Dark Mirage", and "Movin Ahead" with its strong fuzz bass sound.

Rob Sheffield of Rolling Stone summarizes the album as a "deliberately spiky songbag from a man who remains miraculously undiminished as a live performer." Sheffield also notes the wide variety of songs on the album, from protest songs such as "Big Change" and "Lets Roll Again" targeting figures such as Donald Trump and Elon Musk to the jarring opening tracks of "Family Life" and "Dark Mirage" that single out his estranged daughter, Amber Jean, with unique instrumental arrangements.

== Track listing ==
All tracks are written by Neil Young.

1. "Family Life" – 2:50
2. "Dark Mirage" – 5:39
3. "First Fire of Winter" – 4:43
4. "Silver Eagle" – 3:17
5. "Lets Roll Again" – 3:29
6. "Big Change" – 2:53
7. "Talkin to the Trees" – 3:52
8. "Movin Ahead" – 3:18
9. "Bottle of Love" – 4:06
10. "Thankful" – 3:45

== Personnel ==
Credits adapted from Tidal.

=== Neil Young and the Chrome Hearts ===
- Neil Young – lead vocals, guitar, harmonica, piano, vibraphone, production
- Anthony LoGerfo – drums
- Corey McCormick – bass, background vocals
- Micah Nelson – guitar, background vocals
- Spooner Oldham – keyboards, organ

=== Technical ===
- Lou Adler – production
- John Hanlon – mixing, engineering
- Chris Bellman – mastering
- Nick Hodges – additional engineering, tape operation
- Pedro Laet – additional engineering
- Eddie Roberts – mixing assistance
- Nicole Schmiddt – mixing assistance
- Gregg White – engineering assistance
- Liv Painter – engineering assistance
- Sofia Staedler – engineering assistance
- Phillip Broussard – tape operation

== Charts ==
=== Weekly charts ===
Weekly chart performance for Talkin to the Trees
Chart (2025)	Peak position
Austrian Albums (Ö3 Austria)	12
Belgian Albums (Ultratop Flanders)	50
Belgian Albums (Ultratop Wallonia)	43
Croatian International Albums (HDU)	1
Dutch Albums (Album Top 100)	87
French Albums (SNEP)	66
German Albums (Offizielle Top 100)	9
Hungarian Physical Albums (MAHASZ)	13
Scottish Albums (Official Charts)	9
Swiss Albums (Schweizer Hitparade)	13
UK Album Downloads (Official Charts)	25
US Top Album Sales (Billboard)	24
US Top Current Album Sales (Billboard)	16
US Indie Store Album Sales (Billboard)	9

=== Year-end charts ===
Year-end chart performance for Talkin to the Trees
Chart (2025)	Position
Croatian International Albums (HDU)	25
