= Coastal (film) =

2025 documentary film

- 2025 promotional poster
- Directed by: Daryl Hannah
- Written by: Neil Young
- Produced by: Niko Bolas; Neil Young
- Starring: Neil Young
- Cinematography: Daryl Hannah
- Edited by: Daryl Hannah
- Music by: Neil Young
- Release date: April 17, 2025
- Running time: 105 minutes
- Country: United States
- Language: English

Coastal is a 2025 American documentary film which depicts Neil Young's Coastal Tour. It was directed by Daryl Hannah.

== Reception ==
On the review aggregator website Rotten Tomatoes, 80% of 15 critics' reviews are positive. Metacritic, which uses a weighted average, assigned the film a score of 53 out of 100, based on five critics, indicating "mixed or average" reviews.

== Soundtrack ==
Coastal: The Soundtrack

Soundtrack album by Neil Young
- Released: April 18, 2025
- Recorded: July 2023
- Studios: The Ford, Los Angeles; Greek Theatre, Los Angeles; White River Amphitheatre, Auburn
- Genre: Folk rock
- Length: 41:02
- Labels: The Other Shoe; Reprise
- Producers: Neil Young; Niko Bolas

Neil Young chronology
Oceanside Countryside (2025)	Coastal: The Soundtrack (2025)	Talkin to the Trees (2025)

Archives Performance Series chronology
PS21: Noise & Flowers (2022)	PS22: Coastal: The Soundtrack (2025)	PS25: As Time Explodes (2026)

Coastal: The Soundtrack is a soundtrack album by Neil Young released on April 18, 2025, on Reprise Records. The soundtrack includes cuts from the movie recorded by Daryl Hannah, including live tracks such as "I'm the Ocean" and "Love Earth", along with instrumental soundcheck tracks such as "Song X" and "Expecting to Fly".

=== Track listing ===
No.	Title	Recording date/venue	Length
1.	"I'm the Ocean"	July 5, 2023 at The Ford, Los Angeles, CA	7:19
2.	"Comes a Time"	July 20, 2023 at White River Amphitheatre, Auburn, WA	3:15
3.	"Love Earth"		2:38
4.	"Prime of Life"	July 5, 2023 at The Ford, Los Angeles, CA	3:40
5.	"Throw Your Hatred Down"	July 13, 2023 at Greek Theatre, Los Angeles, CA	4:39
6.	"Vampire Blues"	July 3, 2023 at The Ford, Los Angeles, CA	2:44
7.	"When I Hold You in My Arms"	July 10, 2023 at the Greek Theatre, Los Angeles, CA	6:20
8.	"Expecting to Fly"	July 15, 2023 at Greek Theatre, Los Angeles, CA	3:51
9.	"Song X"		2:42
10.	"I Am a Child"		3:01
11.	"Don't Forget Love"	July 3, 2023 at The Ford, Los Angeles, CA	0:53
