= The Times (EP) =

EP by Neil Young
- Released: September 18, 2020
- Recorded: June 19–23, 2020
- Studio: Neil Young's porch
- Genre: Lo-fi
- Length: 26:46
- Label: Reprise
- Producer: Niko Bolas; Neil Young

Neil Young chronology
Homegrown (2020)	The Times (2020)	Return to Greendale (2020)

Singles from The Times
- 1. "Lookin' for a Leader 2020" Released: August 14, 2020

The Times is a live EP from Canadian-American folk rock musician Neil Young. Released on September 18, 2020, the album is made up of live recordings that Young did in his home for the Fireside Sessions series.

== Recording and release ==
The Fireside Sessions is a series of concerts that Young streamed online for fans to provide some solace during the COVID-19 pandemic. This EP was made available only via Young's site and Amazon Music HD for maximum audio quality.

== Critical reception ==
Review aggregator Album of the Year characterizes critical consensus for The Times as a 73 out of 100 with three reviews. Writing for NME, Leonie Cooper gave the album four out of five stars, citing its relevance to ongoing Black Lives Matter protests and in opposition to the Donald Trump 2020 presidential campaign using Young's music. Vish Khanna of Exclaim! agrees that the music is timeless, which is why he finds it depressing, considering the political climate. His review gives The Times eight out of 10 for being "stark and haunting". The editorial staff of JamBase named it a new album highlight. Writing for AllMusic Guide, Stephen Thomas Erlewine, writing that the album is "designed to stir memories of past activism" and "it feels almost more nostalgic than modern", noting that "Young's voice quivers slightly and by supporting himself with just a guitar, he seems slightly fragile, a quality that gives these simple, straightforward covers a subtle new dimension." The editorial staff of the site gave it three out of five stars. Writing for Pitchfork Media, Jesse Jarnow gave the EP a 6.9 out of 10, praising the "lo-fi but distinctly modern starkness that stands in contrast to Young’s longstanding fixation on sound quality and love of vintage (and expensive) analog gear" and Young's "commitment to righteousness" but noting that the protest songs, "neither hit particularly hard as music". Rolling Stone included this release as one of the 18 picks for the month of September 2020.

== Track listing ==
All songs written by Neil Young, except where noted.

No.	Title	Writer(s)	Length
1.	"Alabama"		3:00
2.	"Campaigner"		3:28
3.	"Ohio"		2:49
4.	"The Times They Are A-Changin"	Bob Dylan	5:01
5.	"Lookin’ for a Leader 2020"		4:11
6.	"Southern Man"		3:32
7.	"Little Wing"		4:45

== Personnel ==
- Neil Young – guitar, vocals, harmonica, production
- Niko Bolas – production
- dhlovelife – photography, art direction, recording
- Janice Heo – art direction assistance
- Dana Neilsen – mastering

== Charts ==
Chart performance for The Times
Chart (2020–21)	Peak
Austrian Albums (Ö3 Austria)	38
Belgian Albums (Ultratop Flanders)	144
Belgian Albums (Ultratop Wallonia)	66
French Albums (SNEP)	107
German Albums (Offizielle Top 100)	57
Hungarian Albums (MAHASZ)	10
Italian Albums (FIMI)	89
Scottish Albums (OCC)	14
Swiss Albums (Schweizer Hitparade)	31
UK Albums (OCC)	99
US Top Album Sales (Billboard)	71
US Top Current Album Sales (Billboard)	47
US Indie Store Album Sales (Billboard)	14
