= A Treasure =

Live album by Neil Young
- Released: June 14, 2011
- Recorded: September 20 – October 26, 1984; September 1 – 10, 1985
- Venue: Various
- Genre: Country; rock
- Length: 52:43
- Label: Reprise
- Producer: Neil Young; Ben Keith

Neil Young chronology
| Le Noise (2010) | A Treasure (2011) | Americana (2012) |

Archives Performance Series chronology
| PS07: Songs for Judy (2018) | PS09: A Treasure (2011) | PS11: Bluenote Café (2015) |

Singles from A Treasure
- 1. "Grey Riders" Released: May 20, 2011

Professional ratings
Review scores
| Source | Rating |
|---|---|
| AllMusic | 4/5 stars |
| Robert Christgau | A− |
| Pitchfork | 7.3/10 |
| Rolling Stone | 4/5 stars |

A Treasure is a live album by Canadian / American musician Neil Young, released on June 14, 2011, featuring performances from his 1984–1985 U.S. tour with the International Harvesters. The album is volume nine in Young's Archives Performance Series and the sixth to be released.

== Background ==
The album results from a tour following Young's recording what he later called the first Old Ways, an album of country music that his record company refused to release since they claimed it wasn't commercial enough. In this period, the early to mid-eighties, Young played music in many different genres. His backing band, the "International Harvesters", consisted of professional country musicians from Nashville some of whom had also played (as "The Shocking Pinks") on his rock and roll album Everybody's Rockin'. The album contains old Young songs and newer songs from Old Ways. It contains five previously unreleased songs (tracks 1, 5, 8, 11, and 12).

According to Young, the album's name comes from Ben Keith. "I hadn't heard these takes in 25 years, but when we unearthed them co-producer Ben Keith said, 'This is a treasure.'"

== Track listing ==
All songs written by Neil Young except where indicated.

1. "Amber Jean" – 3:17
  - Recorded for Nashville Now TV, Nashville, 9/20/1984.
2. "Are You Ready for the Country?" – 3:39
  - Recorded at Riverbend Music Center, Cincinnati, 9/21/1984.
3. "It Might Have Been" (Ronnie Green, Harriet Kane) – 2:43
  - Recorded for Austin City Limits TV, Austin, 9/25/1984.
4. "Bound for Glory" – 5:59
  - Recorded at Gilleys Rodeo Arena, Pasadena, TX, 9/29/1984.
5. "Let Your Fingers Do the Walking" – 3:03
  - Recorded at Universal Amphitheater, Universal City, CA, 10/22/1984.
6. "Flying on the Ground Is Wrong" – 4:48
  - Recorded at Greek Theater, Berkeley, CA, 10/26/1984.
7. "Motor City" – 3:22
  - Recorded at Greek Theater, Berkeley, CA, 10/26/1984.
8. "Soul of a Woman" – 4:28
  - Recorded at Greek Theater, Berkeley, CA, 10/26/1984.
9. "Get Back to the Country" – 2:31
  - Recorded at Greek Theater, Berkeley, CA, 10/26/1984.
10. "Southern Pacific" – 7:53
  - Recorded at Minnesota State Fair, St. Paul, 9/1/1985.
11. "Nothing Is Perfect" – 5:02
  - Recorded at Minnesota State Fair, St. Paul, 9/1/1985.
12. "Grey Riders" – 5:58
  - Recorded at Pier 84, New York, 9/10/1985.

== Personnel ==
- Neil Young – guitar, vocals
- Ben "Long Grain" Keith – pedal steel guitar, lap slide guitar, stringman, vocals
- Anthony Crawford – guitar, banjo, vocals
- Rufus Thibodeaux – fiddle
- Spooner Oldham – piano
- Tim Drummond – bass
- Karl T. Himmel – drums
- Hargus "Pig" Robbins – piano (on tracks 10, 11, 12)
- Joe Allen – bass (on tracks 10, 11, 12)
- Matraca Berg & Tracy Nelson – background vocals (on track 11)

Additional roles

- Tim Mulligan – recording, mixing, mastering
- Terry Farris – recording, mixing (track 1)
- Jeff Peterson – recording, mixing (track 3)
- John Nowland, Joel Bernstein – archives research

Blu-ray production

- Bernard Shakey (Neil Young) – direction
- Will Mitchell – production
- Elliot Rabinowitz – executive production
- Atticus Culver-Rease – editing
- Kris Kunz – graphics
- Hannah Johnson, Mark Faulkner – production assistance
- Marcy Gensic – licensing
- Anthony Crawford, Mark Golley – research
- Jan Flanzraich, Robert Sampimon – concert film
- Pegi Young, Steve Cross – photography

== Chart performance ==
| Chart (2011) | Peak position |
|---|---|
| Austrian Albums (Ö3 Austria) | 39 |
| Belgian Albums (Ultratop Flanders) | 39 |
| Belgian Albums (Ultratop Wallonia) | 89 |
| Canadian Albums Chart | 18 |
| Danish Albums (Hitlisten) | 21 |
| Dutch Albums (Album Top 100) | 22 |
| French Albums (SNEP) | 116 |
| German Albums (Offizielle Top 100) | 28 |
| Italian Albums (FIMI) | 56 |
| New Zealand Albums (RMNZ) | 37 |
| Norwegian Albums (VG-lista) | 9 |
| Spanish Albums (Promusicae) | 43 |
| Swedish Albums (Sverigetopplistan) | 19 |
| UK Albums (OCC) | 38 |
| US Billboard 200 | 29 |
| US Top Rock Albums (Billboard) | 7 |
| US Top Current Album Sales (Billboard) | 25 |
| US Indie Store Album Sales (Billboard) | 2 |
