= Grey Riders =

Song of Neil Young

- Danish promotional single cover

Song by Neil Young

from the album A Treasure
- Released: May 20, 2011
- Recorded: September 10, 1985
- Venue: Hudson River Park, NYC
- Genre: Country; rock
- Length: 5:58
- Label: Reprise
- Songwriter: Neil Young
- Producers: Neil Young; Ben Keith

Neil Young singles chronology
"Sign of Love" (2011)	"Grey Riders" (2011)	"Hitchhiker" (2012)

"Grey Riders" is a song performed by artist Neil Young. It is track 12 on Young's A Treasure, and the one song on the album that was released as a single.

== Personnel ==
- Neil Young – guitar, vocals
- Ben Keith – pedal steel guitar
- Anthony Crawford – guitar, vocals
- Rufus Thibodeaux – fiddle
- Hargus "Pig" Robbins – piano
- Joe Allen – bass
- Karl T. Himmel – drums
