= Toast (Neil Young and Crazy Horse album) =

Album by Neil Young & Crazy Horse

Studio album by Neil Young and Crazy Horse
- Released: July 8, 2022
- Recorded: November 8 – December 15, 2000; February 6 – 9, 2001
- Studio: Toast Recording Studios, San Francisco
- Genre: Rock
- Length: 51:59
- Label: Reprise
- Producer: Neil Young; John Hanlon

Neil Young chronology
Barn (2021)	Toast (2022)	Noise & Flowers (2022)

Crazy Horse chronology
Barn (2021)	Toast (2022)	World Record (2022)

Professional ratings
Aggregate scores
Source	Rating
Metacritic	77/100
Review scores
Source	Rating
AllMusic	3.5/5 stars
The Arts Desk	4/5 stars
Clash	6/10
The Observer	3/5 stars
Pitchfork	6.3/10
The Telegraph	5/5 stars
Uncut	4.5/5 stars
Under the Radar	9/10

Toast is the forty-fourth studio album by Canadian-American singer-songwriter Neil Young and Crazy Horse. One of Young's several "lost" albums, it was recorded from 2000 to 2001 but shelved in favor of Are You Passionate?, and was finally released on July 8, 2022. It is Volume 09 of Neil Young Archives' Special Release Series.

== Background ==
The album was recorded in late 2000 and early 2001 at Toast Recording Studios (a facility that previously housed the venerable Coast Recorders, utilized by the likes of Nat King Cole, John Coltrane and Creedence Clearwater Revival) in San Francisco. At that time, Young had trouble writing songs amid a difficult period in his marriage to then-wife Pegi, which largely influenced the somber mood of the material that ensued. According to guitarist Frank "Poncho" Sampedro, "It felt like there was something wrong."

In the middle of the tumultuous sessions, the group took a break to play their first shows in Brazil and Argentina; Sampedro claimed that when the reinvigorated band came back to the studio, everything "had a Latin feel." However, Young said he was not satisfied with the results and ultimately decided to abandon the sessions: "The songs of Toast were so sad at the time that I couldn't put it out. I just skipped it and went on to do another album in its place". According to Young, Rick Rubin often sat in on the Toast sessions as a guest in the control room, although it remains unclear if he made any substantive production contributions.

Instead, Young made the critically maligned Are You Passionate? with Sampedro and Booker T. & the M.G.'s, re-recording "Quit", "How Ya Doin'?" (as "Mr. Disappointment") and "Boom Boom Boom" (as "She's a Healer") from scratch; "Goin' Home" was the only Crazy Horse recording from the Toast sessions to be included in its original form. The title "Gateway of Love" also appeared on Are You Passionate?' sleeve, but the song itself was not included.

Over the next years, Young reappraised the album. In April 2008, Toast was announced for an imminent release as the first installment of the new Special Release Series of Neil Young Archives, with Young comparing it to "a down-played Tonight's The Night" due to its "ambient atmosphere, foggy, blue and desolate". The release failed to materialize, but in the following years Young would periodically talk about Toast in interviews and articles on his website, as well as in his memoir Special Deluxe. It was finally released on July 8, 2022, via Reprise Records on vinyl, CD and digitally.

== Track listing ==
All tracks are written by Neil Young.

Toast track listing
No.	Title	Length
1.	"Quit" (Neil Young, Frank Sampedro)	5:24
2.	"Standing in the Light of Love"	4:18
3.	"Goin' Home"	7:52
4.	"Timberline"	4:10
5.	"Gateway of Love"	10:10
6.	"How Ya Doin'?"	7:00
7.	"Boom Boom Boom"	13:05

== Personnel ==
- Neil Young – vocals, guitar, piano, squeezebox, vibes
- Ralph Molina – drums, percussion, vocals
- Frank Sampedro – guitar, vocals
- Billy Talbot – bass guitar, vocals
- Pegi Young – vocals
- Astrid Young – vocals
- Tom Bray – trumpet

Engineering and production

- Neil Young – production, art direction
- John Hanlon – production, engineering
- Niko Bolas – editing
- Aaron Prellwitz, Alex Osborne, John Hausmann – assistant engineers
- Chris Bellman – mastering
- Hannah Johnson, Ebet Roberts – photography
- Gary Burden, Janice Heo – art direction & design

== Charts ==
Chart performance for Toast
Chart (2022)	Peak position
Austrian Albums (Ö3 Austria)	7
Belgian Albums (Ultratop Flanders)	11
Belgian Albums (Ultratop Wallonia)	17
Dutch Albums (Album Top 100)	18
French Albums (SNEP)	77
German Albums (Offizielle Top 100)	4
Irish Albums (IRMA)	76
Italian Albums (FIMI)	97
Scottish Albums (OCC)	4
Spanish Albums (Promusicae)	37
Swedish Albums (Sverigetopplistan)	34
Swiss Albums (Schweizer Hitparade)	8
UK Albums (OCC)	23
US Billboard 200	198
US Americana/Folk Albums (Billboard)	5
US Indie Store Album Sales (Billboard)	6
