= Young Shakespeare =

Live album by Neil Young
- Released: March 26, 2021
- Recorded: January 22, 1971
- Venue: Shakespeare Theatre, Stratford, Connecticut, United States
- Genre: Folk rock
- Length: 50:26
- Label: Reprise
- Producer: Neil Young; John Hanlon

Neil Young chronology
Way Down in the Rust Bucket (2021)	Young Shakespeare (2021)	Barn (2021)

Archives Performance Series chronology
PS03: Live at Massey Hall 1971 (2007)	PS03.5: Young Shakespeare (2021)	PS04: Tuscaloosa (2019)

Singles from Young Shakespeare
- 1. "Tell Me Why" Released: February 12, 2021; 2. "Down by the River" Released: March 12, 2021

Young Shakespeare is a live album and concert film from Canadian-American folk rock musician Neil Young recorded in 1971, and released on March 26, 2021. Recorded three days after Live at Massey Hall 1971, during the Journey Through the Past Solo Tour.

== Track listing ==
All songs written by Neil Young.

No.	Title	Length
1.	"Tell Me Why"	2:37
2.	"Old Man"	4:08
3.	"The Needle and the Damage Done"	3:47
4.	"Ohio"	3:02
5.	"Dance Dance Dance"	2:26
6.	"Cowgirl in the Sand"	4:20
7.	"A Man Needs A Maid / Heart Of Gold (Medley)"	6:58
8.	"Journey Through The Past"	3:35
9.	"Don't Let It Bring You Down"	2:56
10.	"Helpless"	3:50
11.	"Down By The River"	4:11
12.	"Sugar Mountain"	8:39

== Personnel ==
- Neil Young – guitar, piano, vocals

Additional roles

- Chris Bellman – mastering
- Frank Gironda – director
- John Hanlon – production, mixing
- Jenice Heo – art direction & design
- Wim van der Linden – recording

== Charts ==
Chart performance for Young Shakespeare
Chart (2021)	Peak position
Austrian Albums (Ö3 Austria)	20
Belgian Albums (Ultratop Flanders)	10
Belgian Albums (Ultratop Wallonia)	32
Dutch Albums (Album Top 100)	22
French Albums (SNEP)	72
German Albums (Offizielle Top 100)	12
Hungarian Albums (MAHASZ)	5
Irish Albums (IRMA)	61
Spanish Albums (Promusicae)	59
Swedish Albums (Sverigetopplistan)	34
Swiss Albums (Schweizer Hitparade)	28
UK Albums (OCC)	29
US Billboard 200	95
US Top Rock Albums (Billboard)	14
US Americana/Folk Albums (Billboard)	3
US Vinyl Albums (Billboard)	3
US Indie Store Album Sales (Billboard)	2
