= Barn (album) =

Studio album by Neil Young and Crazy Horse
- Released: December 10, 2021
- Recorded: June 19 – 24, 2021
- Studio: Studio in the Clouds, Rocky Mountains, Colorado
- Genre: Rock
- Length: 42:47
- Label: Reprise
- Producer: Neil Young; Niko Bolas (credited as "The Volume Dealers")

Neil Young chronology
| Young Shakespeare (2021) | Barn (2021) | Toast (2022) |

Crazy Horse chronology
| Way Down in the Rust Bucket (2021) | Barn (2021) | Toast (2022) |

Singles from Barn
- 1. "Song of the Seasons" Released: October 15, 2021; 2. "Heading West" Released: October 28, 2021; 3. "Welcome Back" Released: December 3, 2021

Barn is the forty-third studio album by Canadian-American singer-songwriter Neil Young and his 14th with American rock band Crazy Horse. The album was released on December 10, 2021, by Reprise Records. A stand-alone film of the same name directed by Young's wife Daryl Hannah was also released for streaming and on Blu-ray.

== Background ==
The album is Young's first since the COVID-19 pandemic, and the sessions marked the first time he attempted to record since 2019. Crazy Horse band member Nils Lofgren explains, "In April or May, Neil reached out and said, 'Look, we're not going to be able to play until next summer at the earliest. It's just weird to not do anything as a band for a year and a half. I have four songs I wrote. Why don't we get together, safely, in the Rockies and just be old friends with instruments on and maybe record a few songs?' He had in mind that maybe we'd do that a few times in different locations, every couple of months get together somewhere safely — with testing and masks and all that stuff, vaccinations, and maybe after three trips we'd have an album."

Lofgren continues, "The plan was to get four songs. He thought maybe he'd write another one. He thought we might do that in two or three other locations through the year, just to work towards a record. The great news was, he kept writing. All of a sudden, we had 10 songs. When Neil came up with this idea it was a Godsend to get together and not only be a professional musician, but to do it with a group of great players I've known for over half a century, making new music. Sitting around telling tales and catching up as old friends is a great thing, but after every half hour of that you get up and play for a couple hours and create new music. That's a real gift."

== Writing ==
For the album, Young tried to record the songs as soon as possible after writing them, so as to not lose the feel or emotion of the song.

In a 2021 post to his website, Young states that "Heading West" recalls moving to Winnipeg from Ontario to start a new life as a child after his parents' divorce. "My mom and I traveled across the country together, heading west. She was on her way back home to start over. I was on my way there with her. Here's a song about me and my mom and those 'growing up' times. It's so great to remember her this way!"

== Recording ==
The album was recorded inside an 1870s barn in Colorado. Young had the falling-down barn rebuilt for the sessions, he explains. "It was falling down and going back into the ground So we took it and got a real master barn builder and we rebuilt. Made it just like it was in the old drawings of it and old photographs." He continues, "We got these great ponderosa pines — beautiful building, with all these round surfaces. The thing is, logs on top of each other create a ripple of roundness. There's no squares. Squares are the enemy of sound. They create a standing wave, which makes some frequencies jump way out and other ones disappear. So you have to compensate for all that when you’re recording. We hardly had to do any of that. Everything sounded really good, right in the building."

The songs were recorded live as a band, often as a first take. Producer Niko Bolas explains, "You can always overdub or do it again, but you can never do a first take twice. When Neil, particularly, or that band walks in they're not thinking about making a record. They're thinking about each other. So, if you're recording when everybody walks in, then you get all the mistakes that I say come from the angels. Then you can embellish it. You've got ideas to make it better. Neil's all about it; we got all day, that's fine. But don't mess with the first inspiration."

For the sessions, Lofgren plays a piano he calls the "Gold Rush Upright", which he'd earlier used on After the Gold Rush (1970). He explains, "It's the piano that I played "Southern Man" on when I was 18 years old. And "Only Love Can Break Your Heart", and "Don't Let It Bring You Down". So to sit at that same piano at the age of 70 was really kind of spooky and haunting and beautiful."

One of the highlights during recording for Nils Lofgren was capturing the song "Welcome Back". He explains: "We were doing an aggressive take, and then we took a break. We went back up and Neil started, before we really got rolling, singing this very Beatnik, poetry club, spooky narrative. Ralphie and Billy sucked the whole rhythm down and we just stayed there. We started getting a little interplay there that was beautiful, and we meandered for about eight minutes. That was one of my favourite moments."

Young's wife Daryl Hannah filmed the sessions on an iPad and produced a 73-minute documentary also titled Barn.

== Critical reception ==
Professional ratings
Aggregate scores
| Source | Rating |
|---|---|
| Metacritic | 75/100 |
Review scores
| Source | Rating |
| AllMusic | 4/5 stars |
| And It Don't Stop | A |
| Classic Rock | 4.5/5 stars |
| The Guardian | 3/5 stars |
| Mojo | 4/5 stars |
| NME | 4/5 stars |
| Pitchfork | 6.8/10 |
| PopMatters | 7/10 |
| Record Collector | 4/5 stars |
| Rolling Stone | 3.5/5 stars |

Reviewing in his "Consumer Guide" column, Robert Christgau gave Barn an "A" and declared it the first worthwhile album of new Young songs since 2009's Fork in the Road. In comparison to that album, he said that "Crazy Horse is quieter and gentler [here] as the green consciousness their boss embraced as of 2003's Greendale turns ever more militant and also, unfortunately but fittingly, much darker". Among the highlights in Christgau's mind were "Canerican", "Change Ain't Never Gonna", "Human Race", "Tumblin' Through the Years", and "Don't Forget Love", although he was most impressed by "Welcome Back", calling it a "full-bore astonishment" whose sincerity is evinced in Young's guitar, "so quiet and caring it feels like love". He ultimately named it the best album of 2021.

Writing for PopMatters, John Amen gave the project a 7/10, concluding, "Their navigations of sublimity vs. subtlety, maximalism vs. spaciousness, and free improvisation vs. precise composition are like inexhaustible stylistic lodes ...."

== Track listing ==
| No. | Title | Length |
|---|---|---|
| 1. | "Song of the Seasons" | 6:04 |
| 2. | "Heading West" | 3:23 |
| 3. | "Change Ain't Never Gonna" | 2:53 |
| 4. | "Canerican" | 3:12 |
| 5. | "Shape of You" | 2:55 |
| 6. | "They Might Be Lost" | 4:32 |
| 7. | "Human Race" | 4:14 |
| 8. | "Tumblin' Thru the Years" | 3:20 |
| 9. | "Welcome Back" | 8:28 |
| 10. | "Don't Forget Love" | 3:48 |

== Personnel ==
- Neil Young – vocals, guitar, piano, harmonica
- Nils Lofgren – backing vocals, guitar, piano, accordion
- Billy Talbot – backing vocals, bass
- Ralph Molina – backing vocals, drums

Additional roles

- Jenice Heo – art direction
- Niko Bolas – production
- Daryl Hannah – photography, creative direction
- Adam CK Vollick – photography
- Larry Cragg – photography
- Guy Charbonneau – engineering
- Anthony Catalano – engineering
- Chris Bellman – mastering
- Steve Drymalski – production manager
- Frank Gironda – direction
- Cindi Peters – production coordinator

== Charts ==
=== Weekly charts ===
Weekly chart performance for Barn
| Chart (2021) | Peak position |
|---|---|
| Australian Albums (ARIA) | 54 |
| Austrian Albums (Ö3 Austria) | 10 |
| Belgian Albums (Ultratop Flanders) | 13 |
| Belgian Albums (Ultratop Wallonia) | 34 |
| Canadian Albums (Billboard) | 51 |
| Danish Albums (Hitlisten) | 18 |
| Dutch Albums (Album Top 100) | 9 |
| Finnish Albums (Suomen virallinen lista) | 14 |
| French Albums (SNEP) | 25 |
| German Albums (Offizielle Top 100) | 5 |
| Hungarian Albums (MAHASZ) | 26 |
| Irish Albums (OCC) | 26 |
| Italian Albums (FIMI) | 33 |
| Norwegian Albums (VG-lista) | 8 |
| Portuguese Albums (AFP) | 38 |
| Scottish Albums (OCC) | 8 |
| Spanish Albums (Promusicae) | 40 |
| Swedish Albums (Sverigetopplistan) | 11 |
| Swiss Albums (Schweizer Hitparade) | 9 |
| UK Albums (OCC) | 16 |
| US Billboard 200 | 66 |
| US Americana/Folk Albums (Billboard) | 1 |
| US Top Rock Albums (Billboard) | 6 |
| US Indie Store Album Sales (Billboard) | 3 |

=== Year-end charts ===
Year-end chart performance for Barn
| Chart (2022) | Position |
|---|---|
| German Albums (Offizielle Top 100) | 82 |
