= Are You Passionate? =

Studio album by Neil Young and Booker T. & the M.G.'s
- Released: April 9, 2002
- Recorded: February 8 – December 5, 2001
- Studios: The Site Recording, California (Note: except for "Goin' Home", recorded at Toast Recording Studios)
- Genres: Rock; soul
- Length: 65:46
- Label: Reprise
- Producers: Neil Young; Booker T. Jones; Duck Dunn; Frank Sampedro

Neil Young and Booker T. & the M.G.'s chronology
Road Rock Vol. 1 (2000)	Are You Passionate? (2002)	Greendale (2003)

Singles from Are You Passionate?
- 1. "Let's Roll" Released: December 2001

Professional ratings
Aggregate scores
Source	Rating
Metacritic	54/100
Review scores
Source	Rating
AllMusic	2/5 stars
The Austin Chronicle	3/5 stars
Blender	4/5 stars
E!	B+
Entertainment Weekly	B
Mojo	1.5/5 stars
Pitchfork	7.5/10
Rolling Stone	3.5/5 stars
Spin	7/10
Uncut	4/10

Are You Passionate? is the twenty-sixth studio album by Canadian / American musician Neil Young, his only album to feature Booker T. & the M.G.'s, and his 9th with Crazy Horse, released on April 9, 2002 as a double LP and as a single CD. The album represents Young's foray into soul music, one of many explorations into different genres during his career. Exceptions are rocker "Goin' Home", recorded with Crazy Horse, and the brooding "Let's Roll", a response to the 9/11 terrorist attacks. The album ends with "She's a Healer", an extended jam.

== Background and recording ==
Young had previously toured North America and Europe with Booker T. & the M.G.'s in 1993, after appearing with the group at Bob Dylan's The 30th Anniversary Concert Celebration earlier that year. Young recorded Are You Passionate? with the group at The Site Recording Environment in Marin County during sessions in May 2001 and again in November and December 2001. Young had previously recorded several of the album's songs with longtime collaborators Crazy Horse between November 2000 and February 2001 at Toast studios in San Francisco. "Goin' Home" dates from these sessions. Young would later compile and release an album from these sessions in 2022, entitled Toast. Young explains the decision to change direction during the production of the album:

"Everything just kept evolving, and the songs came back and they were where they need to be to really happen. So it all just fell together as easily as you could imagine: I just let it go, I just let it happen. I knew what was making me feel good, and I knew that I wanted to play my guitar more like a saxophone this time. And I felt more like a horn player while I was playing my guitar."

== Songs ==
The album was written and recorded during a time of "serious problems" in Young's marriage; the lyrics of "Mr. Disappointment", "Differently" and "Quit (Don't Say You Love Me)" in particular reflect a sense of relationship regret.

"Let's Roll" was written in response to the downing of United Airlines Flight 93 during the September 11 attacks. Young would tell Pulse: "It's just so poignant, and there's no more of a legendary, heroic act than what those people did – with no promise of martyrdom, no promise of any reward anywhere for this, other than just knowing that you did the right thing. And not even having a chance to think about it or plan it or do anything — just a gut reaction that was heroic and ultimately cost them all their lives. What more can you say? It was just so obvious that somebody had to write something or do something." Young felt motivated to recognize the valor of the passengers despite the risk that the song would be perceived as trite:

"I said to myself, 'There's gonna be ten people that come out with songs called "Let’s Roll" next week — there'll be two country "Let's Rolls" and a rock and roll "Let's roll" and an R&B "Let's Roll." They'll be everywhere.' So I sat back and waited for six weeks or so, and nothing happened. And then Bush goes on TV and says, 'Let's roll,' and for me that was the last straw. I said, 'I just gotta do this. I don't care if it's the most obvious thing that ever happened."

== Critical reception ==
Are You Passionate? was met with "mixed or average" reviews from critics. At Metacritic, which assigns a weighted average rating out of 100 to reviews from mainstream publications, this release received an average score of 54 based on 17 reviews.

In a review for AllMusic, critic reviewer Stephen Thomas Erlewine wrote: "Instead of sounding like a refreshing change of pace, it's a muddled, aimless affair from an artist who's had too many middling efforts over the last decade." At The Austin Chronicle, Raoul Hernandez admitted the "songs are too long, too slow, and they all sound the same." Billboard called it the "great next step in Young's career but also the best album he could have issued right now."

== Track listing ==
All tracks are written by Neil Young.

Are You Passionate track listing
No.	Title	Length
1.	"You're My Girl"	4:43
2.	"Mr. Disappointment"	5:24
3.	"Differently"	6:03
4.	"Quit (Don't Say You Love Me)"	6:03
5.	"Let's Roll"	5:53
6.	"Are You Passionate?"	5:11
7.	"Goin' Home"	8:47
8.	"When I Hold You in My Arms"	4:43
9.	"Be with You"	3:34
10.	"Two Old Friends"	6:15
11.	"She's a Healer"	9:10

The track "Gateway of Love" is listed on the back cover, but not included on the album. The song was not released until 2022 on the Toast album, but was played in concert with Crazy Horse during 28 of 29 dates of their European tour in 2001. An 8:36 minute performance of the song at Rotterdam Ahoy Sportpaleis, Rotterdam (July 24, 2001) is officially available to stream from the Neil Young Archives website.

== Personnel ==
- Neil Young - vocals, guitar, piano, production
- Booker T. Jones - organ, vibes, vocals, production
- Donald Dunn - bass guitar, vocal on "Differently", production
- Steve Potts - drums, bongos, tambourine
- Frank "Poncho" Sampedro - guitar, vocals, production
- Tom Bray - trumpet
- Pegi Young - vocals
- Astrid Young - vocals

Except "Goin' Home" (Neil Young & Crazy Horse):

- Neil Young - vocals, guitar
- Frank "Poncho" Sampedro - guitar, vocals
- Billy Talbot - bass guitar
- Ralph Molina - drums, vocals

Additional roles

- Gary Burden – art direction & design, front cover
- Jenice Heo – art direction & design
- Joe Yankee – back cover, inside poster, label
- Tim Mulligan – engineering, recording, mixing, mastering
- Kevin Scott, Aaron Prellvitz, Alex Osborne – engineering
- John Hausmann – engineering, mastering
- John Hanlon – engineering, recording (on "Goin' Home")
- Denny Purcell – mastering

== Charts ==
Chart performance for Are You Passionate?
Chart (2002)	Peak position
Australian Albums (ARIA)	41
Austrian Albums (Ö3 Austria)	14
Belgian Albums (Ultratop Flanders)	13
Belgian Albums (Ultratop Wallonia)	46
Danish Albums (Hitlisten)	18
Dutch Albums (Album Top 100)	21
Finnish Albums (Suomen virallinen lista)	8
French Albums (SNEP)	41
German Albums (Offizielle Top 100)	11
Italian Albums (FIMI)	20
New Zealand Albums (RMNZ)	25
Norwegian Albums (VG-lista)	4
Scottish Albums (Official Charts)	18
Swedish Albums (Sverigetopplistan)	4
Swiss Albums (Schweizer Hitparade)	27
UK Albums (Official Charts)	24
US Billboard 200	10
