= Greendale (album) =

2003 studio album by Neil Young and Crazy Horse

Studio album by Neil Young and Crazy Horse
- Released: August 19, 2003
- Recorded: July 11 – September 19, 2002
- Studios: Plywood Analog, Woodside, Redwood City, California
- Genre: Rock
- Length: 78:19
- Label: Warner Bros.
- Producers: Neil Young; L. A. Johnson

Neil Young chronology
Are You Passionate? (2002)	Greendale (2003)	Greatest Hits (2004)

Crazy Horse chronology
Year of the Horse (1997)	Greendale (2003)	Gone Dead Train: The Best of Crazy Horse 1971–1989 (2005)

Professional ratings
Aggregate scores
Source	Rating
Metacritic	64/100
Review scores
Source	Rating
AllMusic	3.5/5 stars
Blender	3.5/5 stars
Dotmusic	5/10
E!	B−
Entertainment Weekly	C−
The Guardian	3/5 stars
Playlouder	3.5/5 stars
Q	4/5 stars
Rolling Stone	4/5 stars
Uncut	7/10

Greendale is the twenty-seventh studio album by Neil Young and Crazy Horse. Greendale is a 10-song musical novel set in a fictional California seaside town of the same name. Based on the saga of the Green family, it combines numerous themes on corruption, observation of the passing of time, environmentalism and mass media consolidation.

== Recording and writing ==
Young recorded the album between July and September 2002 at his Broken Arrow Ranch. The sessions were produced by Young and filmmaker L. A. Johnson. The sessions feature Young on guitar, organ and harmonica backed only by drummer Ralph Molina and bassist Billy Talbot of longtime collaborators Crazy Horse. Unlike other works credited to the band, it does not feature a rhythm guitarist. Frank "Poncho" Sampedro does not appear on the album but did perform with the group during the album's tour. Young chose to record the songs with a stripped-down production team with minimal backing from other musicians to allow the song's stories and characters to be the focus. "There were fewer people, fewer things going on, less distraction. I just tried to focus right in on the core and get back to the roots of what we do. Simple form enables you to get complex with the actual muse. You're not distracted by technicalities. It was all about the content, and I just felt like with Crazy Horse the more simple it is, the better it is."

Young recorded each song as he wrote it, beginning with "Devil's Sidewalk". "The songs started to unravel, I saw the story, what happened next. I wrote the songs one at a time and recorded each one before I'd write the next one. The songs just happened. First thing in the morning, I'd pick up a guitar, play two or three chords and go, 'That's the blueprint. That's what my soul told me, so that's what it is.' Then I'd go to the studio. I would write the words, without guitar, in my car. I'd keep stopping on the way – write two verses, go a hundred yards, stop, write some more. I kept moving, and writing, until I got to the studio. Whatever I had then, that was the song. "Devil's Sidewalk" – the recording is the first time I sang it, the first time the band had ever heard it."

Young did not start with an overall premise and write the songs to fit the overall story, but rather wrote each song one by one, and the overall story emerged from the individual songs themselves. "I simply started writing. I don't know exactly what happened. I've never written songs with characters in them before. I simply wrote a song and then thought: 'Hey, that's interesting.' And then I wrote another song. In the first song, I found it exciting that there were characters with names, that conversed. The next day I wrote a new song with the same characters." "I just let it out. I never tried to make things fit together or anything. I just kept on going. Luckily I could jump from character to character and so continuity wasn't that important. And I found out later that the continuity was golden all the way through." A contemporary review of the album by The Guardian succinctly rehashes the album's storyline as follows: "Grandpa Green is an ornery patriarch who finds himself in the media spotlight when his great-nephew Jed accidentally shoots a cop. Grandpa then suffers a fatal heart attack while fending off a reporter. The death somehow prompts his granddaughter Sun to become an eco-warrior, until FBI surveillance prompts her to leave Greendale for good."

== Release ==
In 2004, the CD was released with a DVD containing Inside Greendale, a documentary featuring in-studio performances of the album being recorded. A DVD-Audio version and box set vinyl LP version were also released, with both Advanced Resolution Stereo and 5.1 surround sound mixes, and a video of "Devil's Sidewalk" from the film.

A map of the fictional town, a gallery of Earl Green's art, a family tree diagram, and biographies of each character were provided on Young's website at the time. Young filmed a movie on Super 8 to accompany the music. Young cast friends and family members as the album's characters. Wife Pegi Young plays Edith and steel guitarist Ben Keith plays Grandpa. Sun Green is played by Sarah White, a classmate of Young's daughter Amber. In the movie, the actors lip-synch Young's lyrics as he sings them. The movie was played on stage during the full-band concerts in fall 2003 and a feature-length DVD of the movie was released in late 2004.

== Tour ==
Young performed the song cycle in a solo acoustic setting during a tour of Europe in April and May 2003. Young gave extended intros to each song and shared the story of the characters during the performances. The concerts marked the first time Young played a setlist consisting of a song cycle of new material since introducing Tonight's the Night to audiences in 1973. "There's a charge in doing all these new songs at once, all in a row. It's a big rebirth for me. I was apprehensive introducing this much new material at once, but it's something I looked forward to, because it's a challenge. A challenge for me, and a challenge for the audience: It's really one long song, and to get your money's worth, you have to pay attention." A DVD of performances filmed at Vicar Street, Dublin was included with some editions of the album. An audio-only version has since been made available as a stand-alone live album on digital download and streaming services such as iTunes and Amazon.

Between June and November 2003, Young toured the material with the support of Crazy Horse and background singers. In November 2020, a live album from a September performance from The Air Canada Centre in Toronto was released as Return to Greendale.

== Reception ==
Greendale has been compared to the literary classics of Thornton Wilder's Our Town and Sherwood Anderson's Winesburg, Ohio for its complexity and emotional depth in exploring a small town in America. The album, concert, film and DVDs have produced a vast divergence of critical opinion ranging from being called "amateur" to being voted as one of the best albums of 2003 by Rolling Stone magazine music critics.

== Track listing ==
All songs written by Neil Young.

No.	Title	Length
1.	"Falling from Above"	7:27
2.	"Double E"	5:18
3.	"Devil's Sidewalk"	5:18
4.	"Leave the Driving"	7:14
5.	"Carmichael"	10:20
6.	"Bandit"	5:13
7.	"Grandpa's Interview"	12:57
8.	"Bringin' Down Dinner"	3:16
9.	"Sun Green"	12:03
10.	"Be the Rain"	9:13
Total length:		78:19

== Personnel ==
- Neil Young – guitar, organ, harmonica, vocal, production, mixing

Crazy Horse

- Ralph Molina – drums, vocal
- Billy Talbot – bass, vocal

with:

- The Mountainettes:
  - Pegi Young – vocal
  - Nancy Hall – vocal
  - Twink Brewer – vocal
  - Sue Hall – vocal

Additional roles

- John Hausmann – engineering, assistant mixing
- Will Mitchell – engineering, audio effects, assistant mixing
- Mark Humphreys – in-house music production
- Tim Mulligan – mastering

== Comics adaptation ==
Vertigo Comics made the production of the comic book adaptation of the album with the same title. Writer Joshua Dysart and Neil Young were involved in the project. Greendale graphic novel (ISBN 1-4012-2698-1) was released in June 2010, with Cliff Chiang providing the art.

== Charts ==
Chart performance for Greendale
Chart (2003)	Peak position
Australian Albums (ARIA)	48
Austrian Albums (Ö3 Austria)	10
Belgian Albums (Ultratop Flanders)	2
Belgian Albums (Ultratop Wallonia)	10
Danish Albums (Hitlisten)	5
Dutch Albums (Album Top 100)	20
Finnish Albums (Suomen virallinen lista)	12
French Albums (SNEP)	32
German Albums (Offizielle Top 100)	6
Irish Albums (IRMA)	5
Italian Albums (FIMI)	6
New Zealand Albums (RMNZ)	41
Norwegian Albums (VG-lista)	5
Swedish Albums (Sverigetopplistan)	5
Swiss Albums (Schweizer Hitparade)	34
UK Albums (Official Charts)	24
US Billboard 200	22
