= Larry Johnson (film producer) =

American film producer

- Born: June 11, 1947; Ft. Benning, Georgia, United States
- Died: January 21, 2010 (aged 62); Redwood City, California, United States
- Other name: L. A. Johnson
- Occupations: Film and music producer

Larry Alderman Johnson (June 11, 1947 – January 21, 2010) was an American film and music producer, director, and editor best known for his long association with musician Neil Young.

== Early life ==
Born in Ft. Benning, Georgia to a military family, this self-described "military brat" attended Peekskill Military Academy and Rutgers University. While at Peekskill Military Academy, his creative skills and "good ear" for music were well respected. He served as a band leader and drum major. Johnson became involved in filmmaking in the late 1960s and was originally one of the East Coast guerilla documentary filmmakers that emerged in that era. Part of a New York scene that also included Martin Scorsese, Brian De Palma, editor Thelma Schoonmaker, L.M. Kit Carson and others, they brought a street-wise sensibility and engaged political bent to their work that reflected the turbulent era of the late Sixties.

Johnson's lengthy career includes stints as producer, director, editor, sound recordist, cinematographer, and production manager. Among fellow staff like Thelma Schoomaker, Jeanne Field, and Bob Meurice at Paradigm Films, Johnson worked as an assistant to Paradigm Films founders John Binder and Michael Wadleigh in 1969. Beginning his career as a sound recordist, he was nominated for an Academy Award in 1971 for Best Sound for his location recording, mixing and sound design on the feature documentary, Woodstock and also was involved as an assistant to director Michael Wadleigh. Of his role in the production of Woodstock, one source claims Johnson as having "embodied the soul of Woodstock more than any other of the film crew people."

In 1972, Marjoe, an exposé of the evangelist-con man Marjoe Gortner, was released in which Johnson was the sound recordist. Frequently teamed with veteran cameraman David Myers, in the early 1970s Johnson was frequently associated with TVTV, a band of renegade documentarians who brought a fresh sensibility to the conventions of television documentaries and their work appeared on PBS and gained much critical respect.

== Working with Neil Young ==
L.A. Johnson and Neil Young first crossed paths at Woodstock in 1969 where Young, who was performing as part of Crosby, Stills & Nash, refused to be filmed (although there is footage on Young's "Archives" of Young and Stills playing the slower, original arrangement of "Mr. Soul" on acoustic guitars). Johnson and cameraman David Meyers were recruited by CSNY to film their residence at the Fillmore East in 1970 for a never-completed concert film. 1971 saw Frederic Underhill and Johnson produce Neil Young's film Journey Through the Past, which incorporated some of the CSNY 1970 footage and was the beginning of his long association with Neil Young. He received producer credit for the soundtrack LP.

In 1978, Johnson re-united with Young for Young's concert film, Rust Never Sleeps, and was also producer of Young's feature film, the eccentric "nuclear comedy", Human Highway featuring Young, Dennis Hopper, Dean Stockwell, Russ Tamblyn and Sally Kirkland, which was released in 1982. His continued association with Young also found him producing the 1984 Solo Trans LaserDisc/VHS directed by Hal Ashby and directing Young's 1986 Cow Palace concert "Live from a Rusted-Out Garage" for Pay Per View.

As head of Young's film production company, Shakey Pictures, Johnson has produced Young's concert videos, Weld, Year of the Horse, Neil Young: Silver and Gold, and Neil Young: Red Rocks Live, directing the latter two as well. Johnson continued working with Young on his many projects including the long-awaited The Archives and was co-producer of Young's ambitious concept album Greendale (2003). Described by Young as a "musical novel," it was a series of songs depicting a small-town California family caught up in the post-9/11 world, as they struggle to maintain their way of life during a time of social and political upheaval. Reminiscent of David Lynch's Blue Velvet and Twin Peaks, with the Devil lurking in the shadows, Johnson helped Young craft the multi-layered backstories for the song's characters and the record and ensuing film remain one of the singer-songwriters greatest accomplishments. Johnson also produced the accompanying movie, directed by Young, and oversaw the two-year Greendale tour, a rock concert-cum-Broadway musical hybrid that was an astonishing realization of the concept. Recently, both a comic book and a play based on the concept album have been reputed to be in the works.

Johnson also co-produced Young's 2006 protest album, Living with War and served as in-house video director on many of Young's tours, including the CSNY "Freedom of Speech" tour, which drew heavily from Young's anti-war album. While producing videos for the Living with War website, Young and Johnson became acquainted with "Nightline" correspondent Michael Cerre, who provided stories of his experiences as a correspondent in Iraq. Cerre and Young began to craft a narrative that would incorporate footage of soldiers in Iraq intercut with concert footage of the tour. Johnson produced the feature, which garnered Young his strongest reviews as a filmmaker. Writing for The Huffington Post website, Evan Handler opined, "I feel strange saying it, but "CSNY/Déjà Vu" might just be the most important film to come out of the 2008 Sundance festival. Not due to any great filmmaking innovation (though I do think it's a good movie), but due to the simple choice by director Neil Young (working under the pseudonym Bernard Shakey) to make the film's focus not so much his and his bandmates' outspokenness in opposition to the Bush administration and the war in Iraq, but the reactions that outspokenness provoked in their audiences and the press." The film was also accepted at the Berlin Festival. It opened in American theatres in July 2008 and received further praise for its emotional power, with the Los Angeles Times saying, "Though it may be another in a long line of choir-preaching, anti-Iraq war documentaries, "CSNY/Déjà Vu," Neil Young's effective hybrid of concert film and political snapshot, is one of the shrewdest and most entertaining of the bunch....Recent and archival interview, news, war and music footage, which often juxtapose the Vietnam and Iraq conflicts, round out this unflinching, well-constructed picture," while Richard Roeper gave it a thumbs up on "At the Movies", calling it, "A good, strong documentary....(Young) is a brilliant artist;” and Steven Rea of "The Philadelphia Inquirer" wrote, "as Young – er, Shakey – shifts the focus from himself and his bandmates to several of these veterans, the film achieves a level of unexpected power and poignancy." Johnson was heavily involved in both the video and physical production of the two decade gestation of Young's The Archives Vol. 1 1963-1972 and was credited as the producer when released in June 2009.

=== LincVolt ===
Johnson continued to work with Young on his latest film project, a documentary about converting older gas-guzzling automobiles into fuel-efficient, low emission, environment-friendly vehicles, better known as Linc-Volt.

== Other projects ==
Returning to the rock scene in 1975, Johnson handled sound recording on Bob Dylan's Rolling Thunder Review fantasia, Renaldo & Clara, and was a line producer for the legendary The Last Waltz concert and film. In the 1980s, Johnson turned to directing concert videos for various musicians including Joni Mitchell's "Shadows and Light", Belinda Carlisle's "Live in Concert", New Edition's "Past & Present", and Bobby Brown's "My Prerogative". He also directed music videos, including the popular jingoist anthem, "God Bless the U.S.A." by country singer Lee Greenwood.

1993 saw the release of a different kind of music video for Johnson, "Lean by Jarre,” a symphonic performance by the Oscar-winning film composer Maurice Jarre, whose long collaboration with director David Lean was the basis for the concert video. With clips from such Lean film classics as Lawrence of Arabia and Doctor Zhivago, the home video release was a testament to the unforgettable contribution of Jarre's scores to Lean's later films as well confirmation that Johnson was a master of the in-concert form, be it classical or popular and it remains a career highlight.

In 1995 Johnson produced and directed the innovative Forrest Gump: Music and the Times CD-ROM featuring songs from the Academy Award-winning film's soundtrack and interviews with the recording artists including reunions of the members of The Byrds and Buffalo Springfield. He also worked outside of his involvement with Neil Young, often utilizing the talents of his son, Ben, an acclaimed director/cameraman in his own right. Though perhaps not well known to the public at large, L.A. Johnson was widely respected by his peers in both the film and music communities. Twice married and divorced to music contractor Leslie Morris, he was father to a son, Ben (b. 1982) and a daughter, Hannah (b. 1984). An avid fisherman, he named his production company Upstream Productions, and lived on a boat in the Bay Area.

== Death ==
Johnson died in Redwood City, California on January 21, 2010, at the age of 62.

== Achievements ==
- Nominated for an Academy Award for Best Sound, Woodstock 1971
- Nominated for a Grammy for co-producing "Looking for a Leader" from Living with War 2007
