= Reactor (album) =

Re·ac·tor

Studio album by Neil Young and Crazy Horse
- Released: November 2, 1981
- Recorded: October 9, 1980 – July 21, 1981
- Studios: Modern Recorders, Redwood City, California
- Genres: Hard rock; post-punk; punk blues; krautrock; proto-grunge; heartland rock
- Length: 38:45
- Label: Reprise
- Producers: David Briggs; Tim Mulligan; Neil Young; Jerry Napier

Neil Young chronology
Hawks & Doves (1980)	Re·ac·tor (1981)	Trans (1982)

Crazy Horse chronology
Live Rust (1979)	Re·ac·tor (1981)	Life (1987)

Singles from Reactor
- 1. "Southern Pacific" / "Motor City" Released: December 14, 1981; 2. "Opera Star" / "Surfer Joe and Moe the Sleaze" Released: February 1982

Re·ac·tor is the twelfth studio album by Canadian-American musician Neil Young, and his fourth with American rock band Crazy Horse, released on November 2, 1981. It was his last album released through Reprise Records before he moved to Geffen for his next five albums.

== Background ==
Reactor sees Young reunited with longtime collaborators Crazy Horse, their first album together since Rust Never Sleeps in 1979 and their first full studio album since 1975's Zuma. The album is notable for its driving rhythms and long jams with repetitive lyrics. Young was involved in an intensive therapy program for his young son who had cerebral palsy, and biographer Jimmy McDonough suggests that the repetition of the therapy sessions influenced the structure of the songs on the album. The album was Young's last album for Reprise Records until 1988. His next five records would be released under a new contract with Geffen Records.

== Writing and recording ==
"Surfer Joe and Moe the Sleaze" tells a satirical tale supposedly inspired by Reprise executives Joe Smith and Mo Ostin. Frank Sampedro recalls recording the song and the difficulty the band had maintaining a consistent tempo, which the band remedied through overdubbing tambourines and other percussion. "'Surfer Joe' sped up, slowed down, so we would spend time hittin' everything we could find in there to play the groove through it: banging tambourine, banging pieces of metal together, doing handclaps." The original 1981 album gave Neil Young sole writing credit on every track; however, the 2021 live release Way Down in the Rust Bucket added Frank Sampedro's name as a co-writer on "Surfer Joe and Moe the Sleaze".

The song "T-Bone" has been singled out for ridicule for its simplistic lyrics. In a 1981 Rockline interview, Young recalled the recording of the song fondly:

"The night we recorded that we didn't have anything else happening in particular. We were just in the studio and we had already recorded the song that we thought we were gonna be recording and we really felt like playing. So I just went in, picked up my guitar and started playing. If you notice, the song starts with a straight cut right through the middle. We'd already started playing before the machine started. So that was a one-shot deal. I just made up the lyrics and we did the whole thing that night. It was a one-take thing. It seems like the lyrics were just on my mind. It's very repetitive but I'm not such an inventive guy. I thought those two lines were good. Every time it sounded a little different to me when I started singing. Then I was thinking about something else. I really like that cut better than the rest on Re-ac-tor."

"Southern Pacific" launches an album side largely devoted to lyrics about transportation. "Southern Pacific" finds Young imagining life as a train conductor nearing retirement. In the 1980s, Young enjoyed sharing a model trainset with his son, would later acquire a share in Lionel, and would help invent a remote control model train operating system. "Southern Pacific" would feature prominently in Young's country setlists in 1984 and 1985 during his tour with the International Harvesters, and again during Young's 1999 solo acoustic tour.

In "Motor City" Young addresses the malaise era of automobile manufacturing in Detroit, and the recent success of Toyota and Datsun in the American market. Young would continue to play the song throughout the early 1980s, and, like "Southern Pacific," feature the song in his country setlists during the Old Ways era.

The album closes with the war song "Shots". It was first performed live in May 1978 at the Boarding House in San Francisco during the sessions for Rust Never Sleeps in a plaintive, solo acoustic performance. On Re-ac-tor, it appears as a driving, full band performance with additional machine gun sound effects overdubbed. The song also features Young's first use of the Synclavier, which he would use more extensively on Trans and Landing on Water.

== Packaging ==
The cover of the album displays the title separated by syllable. In the 1981 Rockline interview, Young explains, "I wanted to know what the word meant before I used it as a title so I looked it up in the dictionary and that's the way it was broken up and it made sense to me like that; that's the vision I had when I looked at it. It looked right. There's no reason behind it, no cosmic reason."

The album features a Latin translation of the Serenity Prayer on its back cover ("'Deus dona mihi serenitatem accipere res quae non possum mutare fortitudinem mutare res quae possum atque sapientiam differentiam cognoscere'" – "God grant me the serenity to accept the things I cannot change, the courage to change the things I can, and the wisdom to know the difference"). Young explains in the 1981 Rockline interview:

"It's a serenity prayer. It was on a plate in my bathroom and I saw it every morning for about a year and a half and it applies a lot to what I'm thinking about in my personal life, so I thought I'd put it on my record but it was too much of a personal trip to lay on everybody in English so I put it in Latin so it wouldn't be so up front."

The year and a half likely corresponds to the eighteen month period Young and his wife devoted to an intensive therapy program for their special-needs child, Ben. Young had not yet shared publicly details about his family situation at the time. Young would further explain in a 1995 interview with Nick Kent for Mojo magazine:

"We didn't spend as much time recording Re-ac-tor as we should've. The life of both that record and the one after it – Trans – were sucked up by the regime we'd committed ourselves to. See, we were involved in this program with my young son Ben for 18 months which consumed between 15 and 18 hours of every day we had. It was just all-encompassing and it had a direct effect on the music of Re-ac-tor and Trans."

== Release ==
The album was unavailable on compact disc until it was released as a HDCD-encoded remastered version on August 19, 2003, as part of the Neil Young Archives Digital Masterpiece Series.

The lackluster sales of the album upon its initial release led Young to feel his record company, Reprise, did not put forth enough effort in promoting the record. This contributed to Young's decision to sign with Geffen Records for his next five albums, a decision he would later regret.

== Critical reception ==
Professional ratings
Review scores
Source	Rating
AllMusic	2/5 stars
Pitchfork	6.8/10
The Rolling Stone Album Guide	3/5 stars
Spin Alternative Record Guide	7/10
The Village Voice	B+

William Ruhlmann of AllMusic is largely dismissive of Re·ac·tor in his retrospective review, but praises "Shots" as "a more substantive and threatening song given a riveting performance". He deemed the album "a guitar-drenched hard rock set made up of thrown-together material."

In 2003, Greg Kot of the Chicago Tribune proclaimed that Re·ac·tor "works up a punk-blues racket [...] that sounds as shaggy and disheveled as anything the Replacements recorded". Salon described the album as a proto-grunge effort. The Harvard Crimson described it retrospectively in 1985 as "gritty post-punk".

== Track listing ==
All tracks are written by Neil Young, except "Surfer Joe and Moe the Sleaze", written by Young and Frank Sampedro.

Side one
No.	Title	Length
1.	"Opera Star"	3:31
2.	"Surfer Joe and Moe the Sleaze"	4:15
3.	"T-Bone"	9:10
4.	"Get Back on It"	2:14
Total length:		19:10

Side two
No.	Title	Length
5.	"Southern Pacific"	4:07
6.	"Motor City"	3:11
7.	"Rapid Transit"	4:35
8.	"Shots"	7:42
Total length:		19:35

== Personnel ==
- Neil Young – vocals, guitar, Synclavier, piano, handclaps, production

Crazy Horse

- Frank Sampedro – guitar, synthesizer, vocals, handclaps
- Billy Talbot – bass, vocals, handclaps
- Ralph Molina – drums, percussion, vocals, handclaps

Additional roles

- David Briggs – production
- Tim Mulligan – production, recording, mastering
- Jerry Napier – production, recording
- Simon Levy – art direction
- Richard Keyes – art design (CD packaging)
- Gary Burden, Jenice Heo – art design (CD repackaging)
- David Gold – mastering

== Charts ==
Chart (1981)	Peak position
Canada Top Albums/CDs (RPM)	20
New Zealand Albums (RMNZ)	4
Norwegian Albums (VG-lista)	24
Swedish Albums (Sverigetopplistan)	32
UK Albums (Official Charts)	69
US Billboard 200	27
