= Crazy Moon (album) =

Studio album by Crazy Horse
- Released: 1978
- Genres: Hard rock; rock
- Length: 37:06
- Label: RCA
- Producers: Richard Heenan; Kirby Johnson; Neil Young; David Briggs; Tim Mulligan

Crazy Horse chronology
Zuma (1975)	Crazy Moon (1978)	Rust Never Sleeps (1979)

Professional ratings
Review scores
Source	Rating
AllMusic	3.5/5 stars
Christgau's Record Guide	C+

Crazy Moon is the fourth album by the American band Crazy Horse. It was released by RCA Records in 1978. The record was recorded at the Broken Arrow in Redwood City, Kendun Studio in Burbank, Village Records in West Los Angeles, and Sound City in Van Nuys (mixed at Woodrow Hill in Hollywood).

== Track listing ==
Side one
No.	Title	Writer(s)	Length
1.	"She's Hot"	Steve Antoine, Frank Sampedro	3:08
2.	"Going Down Again"	Ralph Molina	3:24
3.	"Lost and Lonely Feelin'"	Sampedro	3:09
4.	"Dancin' Lady"	Sampedro, Billy Talbot	3:19
5.	"End of the Line"	Molina	3:06
6.	"New Orleans"	Ben Keith, Talbot	3:10

Side two
No.	Title	Writer(s)	Length
7.	"Love Don't Come Easy"	Molina	3:08
8.	"Downhill"	Sampedro	4:14
9.	"Too Late Now"	Sampedro	2:53
10.	"That Day"	Talbot	3:14
11.	"Thunder and Lightning"	Sampedro, Talbot	3:56

== Personnel ==
- Billy Talbot - bass, vocals
- Ralph Molina - drums, vocals
- Frank "Poncho" Sampedro - guitars, vocals

Additional personnel

- Neil Young - guitar, co-producer on 1, 2, 6, 8, 11
- Greg Leroy - guitar
- Michael Curtis - synthesizer
- Bobby Notkoff - violin
- Kenny Walther - trombone
- Tom Bray - trumpet
- Mike Kowalski - drums
- Jay Graydon - guitar
- Barry Goldberg - piano, keyboards
- Steve Lawrence - saxophone
- Kirby Johnson - producer
- Dan Doyle - art direction, photography
- Richard Heenan - producer, engineer
- David Briggs - engineer, co-producer on 1, 2, 6, 8, 11
- Tim Mulligan - engineer, co-producer on 1, 2, 6, 8, 11
- Bob Bullock - engineer
- Leslie Foster - engineer
- Spellbound Kelly - engineer
- Jackson Schwartz - engineer
- D.C. Snyder - engineer
