= Gone Dead Train: The Best of Crazy Horse 1971–1989 =

Compilation album by Crazy Horse
- Released: Nov 15, 2005
- Genre: Hard rock; rock
- Label: Raven

Crazy Horse chronology
Greendale (2003)	Gone Dead Train: The Best of Crazy Horse 1971–1989 (2005)	Scratchy: The Complete Reprise Recordings (2005)

Professional ratings
Review scores
Source	Rating
AllMusic	4.5/5 stars

Gone Dead Train: The Best of Crazy Horse 1971–1989 is a 2005 compilation album released by Crazy Horse.

== Track listing ==
No.	Title	Writer(s)	Length
1.	"Gone Dead Train"	Jack Nitzsche, Russ Titelman	4:09
2.	"Dance, Dance, Dance"	Neil Young	2:13
3.	"Beggars Day"	Nils Lofgren	4:31
4.	"I Don't Want To Talk About It"	Danny Whitten	5:20
5.	"Downtown"	Whitten, Young	3:16
6.	"Rock And Roll Band"	Sidonie Jordan	3:11
7.	"Don't Keep Me Burning"	Michael Curtis	4:14
8.	"Lady Soul"	Curtis	3:35
9.	"Don't Look Back"	Curtis	3:28
10.	"She's Hot"	Steve Antoine, Frank Sampedro	3:11
11.	"Downhill"	Sampedro	4:13
12.	"End Of The Line"	Ralph Molina	3:01
13.	"Going Down Again"	Molina	3:25
14.	"Thunder And Lightning"	Sampedro, Billy Talbot	3:59
15.	"Left For Dead"	Sonny Mone	4:20
16.	"Child Of War"	Mone	3:35
17.	"World Of Love"	Mone	4:29
18.	"In The Middle"
19.	"Pill's Blues"	George Whitsell	4:02
20.	"Let Me Go"	Whitten	3:47
