= Landing on Water =

Studio album by Neil Young
- Released: July 21, 1986
- Recorded: August 1983 – March 1986
- Studios: Broken Arrow Ranch, Woodside; Record One, Los Angeles
- Genre: Rock • new wave
- Length: 40:04
- Label: Geffen
- Producers: Neil Young; Danny Kortchmar

Neil Young chronology
Old Ways (1985)	Landing on Water (1986)	Life (1987)

Singles from Landing on Water
- 1. "Weight of the World" / "Pressure" Released: September 1986; 2. "Touch the night (Promo)" Released: 1986

Landing on Water is the sixteenth studio album by Neil Young. The album was released on July 21, 1986, by Geffen Records.

The album represents a return to a contemporary rock sound after the 1985 country album Old Ways and 1983 rockabilly album Everybody's Rockin'. Young's record company, Geffen famously had sued the artist for creating albums unrepresentative of his familiar style. For Landing on Water, Young employed producer Danny Kortchmar, engineer Niko Bolas and studio drummer Steve Jordan. The album is noted for its unique production and synthetic 1980s sound with prominent drums, synclavier and synthesizers, giving it a "claustrophobic" feel. According to Young in a 2009 interview, "one record company president in Europe told me it was the most claustrophobic record he had ever heard, and I thought that was pretty cool. He put it on in his Porsche and would turn it up real loud. He just felt like it was all over him."

== Recording ==
=== First attempts ===
Like its predecessor, Old Ways, Landing on Water was recorded over the course of over two years. The first attempt at a commercial, non-genre album dates from late 1983 and early 1984. The backing tracks for "I Got a Problem" and "Hard Luck Stories" were both recorded at Young's home studio at Broken Arrow Ranch as solo recordings with Synclavier. "Hard Luck Stories" was recorded the same day in January 1984 as an early attempt at "Razor Love", which later appeared on 2000's Silver & Gold, and a new attempt at "If You Got Love", an outtake from Trans. Some elements of Young's original 1983-1984 recordings were used as backing tracks with new drum, guitar and synth parts added during the later Record One sessions.

Young would also attempt new material at the ranch with Crazy Horse and producer Elliot Mazer. The band struggled to achieve Young's desired commercial, synthetic sound with a strong drum sound. In interviews for Jimmy McDonough's biography Shakey, the band express their frustrations with the recording process. Mazer and Young had the band record separately in contrast to their familiar live recording style. Feedback and other equipment problems culminated in Young smashing a guitar in frustration and eventually abandoning the sessions.

The band would perform the new material in a live setting at The Catalyst in Santa Cruz across four shows on February 6 and 7, 1984. The new material included album tracks "Touch the Night", "Violent Side", and "I Got a Problem" as well as the songs "Rock, Rock, Rock", "So Tired" and "Your Love Is Good To Me". The concerts were professionally recorded and circulate as bootlegs. Young and the band would attempt additional sessions at The Power Station in New York with David Briggs as producer, but again were unsuccessful at completing an album. In a 1990 Rolling Stone interview with James Henke, Young explains: "We went to New York and tried to record these songs for three weeks, and we didn’t get one track. We just blew a whole bunch of time. That was when I first introduced the horns; we had a horn section with Crazy Horse. We just never could get it to gel." According to a 1995 interview with Nick Kent for Mojo Magazine, an attempt was made to record the album with the band R.E.M., but efforts were scuttled when Geffen threatened to sue Young for recording with the group. Young's experiences with Geffen would result in the band signing with Warner instead of Geffen in their own negotiations for a major label contract that decade. Eventually, Young would place his attempts on recording a rock album on hold and go on tour for the next year with a country band instead. Young would reflect on the difficulties of recording a commercial sounding album for Geffen in early 1984 during interviews for Shakey:

"I'd listen to the radio and hear this big drum sound, and I'd say, "That's pretty cool. I wanna get that. But I don't wanna do what they're doing. I don’t wanna sound like those records—but I want that drum sound." It turned out it was a very difficult thing to do. And y’know, with Crazy Horse it’s such a special thing, because none of us can really play. We know we aren’t any good. Fuck, we’d get it in the first take every time, and it was never right—but we could never do it better. So what happens is when a real musician enters that, it fucks it all up. They were great "feel" guys, both of 'em, but it made everybody conscious of how they were really dumb players. Oh, the sessions sucked. We were all inhibited by each other—and we were all sick, fuckin' Legionnaires' disease or something. I don't know why we went to New York. We took the Horse way out of its environment. The Power Station—too many hit records had been made there. It ended up a big fuckin' bum-out. Everybody was bummed, and we didn't do anything for a long time. Because we never failed completely to fuckin' get anything. It was a rough time. I had a lot of animosity from my own team during those years—I mean, Briggs was pissed at me. Crazy Horse had a big chip on their shoulder. They were pissed because I recorded with other people. Everybody was pissed at me, y'know."

=== Record One Sessions ===
In late 1985 and early 1986, Young would make a new attempt at recording a more commercial sounding album at Record One Studios in Los Angeles. This time, Young would hire producer Danny Kortchmar, who had recently seen success with Don Henley's Building the Perfect Beast. Young, Kortchmar and studio drummer Steve Jordan play all the instruments on the album, including Synclavier, synth bass and other synthesizers. Young would later play with Jordan again during his SNL performance of "Rockin' in the Free World" in 1989. Jordan would also later go on to join the Rolling Stones. Kortchmar would bring in engineer Niko Bolas, launching a long term working relationship. Bolas would go on to produce several of Young's subsequent albums.

Kortchmar recalled his experiences making the album in a 2019 interview with Dale Kawashima:

"He had heard the stuff I was doing with Don Henley, and he was intrigued by the idea of using more electronics. He had a Synclavier (synthesizer/work station), and so he brought me in, thinking I was a guy that knew this stuff, which I did to some degree. The first thing I did was call two of my great pals to work with me on it. One was Steve Jordan the great drummer, and the other was Niko Bolas, who’s a brilliant audio engineer. And we came in there and just blew the joint up. That was incredible working with Neil, because we were really pounding away. I was playing a synth bass on most of it, and Neil had pre-sequenced stuff that he’d done on his Synclavier. So we’d run the Synclavier, and Neil would bash away and Steve…his drum sound is just punching right through the wall. And Neil responded brilliantly to this big beat, so that was a lot of fun. I love Neil, he’s such a great cat...he’s such a talented, adventurous fellow, musically. We had a great time making that record.

The album's distinctive production and mix were the result of Young's desire to create a unique sound. Additionally, he insisted on a recording process where layers of instruments were overdubbed onto the original demos. Young explained in interviews for Shakey:

"I needed a complete change. I wanted to see what was happening, what was going on in the studios in L.A., what kind of records were being made, how they were making them. The vocals on that record were pretty weak because they were all overdubbed. The demos were overdubbed, too, because the original track was overdubbed onto a click track. It wasn’t Danny's idea to do that. That was my fault. It was a concept thing, I wanted to see what would happen. That was sort of a reentry into creative recording. I kind of lost it awhile there. Landing on Water was the beginning...or the end, depending on how you look at it. I just wanted to try somethin' else, break out...I felt like I was dying. Felt like if I didn't do something, I was gonna lose it. Something had to wake me up."

The decision to add a boy's choir to the tracks "Violent Side" and "Touch the Night" was the result of meeting the San Francisco Boys Choir at an event that Young and his wife attended. The couple were asked to speak at a parents event about their experiences raising a child with cerebral palsy, and Young was asked to introduce the choir. He later asked them to perform for the album.

== Songs ==
The lyrics of several of the songs reflect the personal pressure Young was facing from his record company and the need to care for his family at the time. Additionally, Young took up weight-lifting during the recording of the album, which he credits in making the music more aggressive.

=== "Weight of the World" ===
The bookends of the album, "Weight of the World" and "Drifter," both consider the impact of relationship in confronting the world's challenges. In "Weight of the World," he praises his relationship for helping him rise above his challenges, while in "Drifter," he reexamines the benefits of partnership and whether he'd prefer to escape his troubles instead.

=== "Violent Side" ===
"Violent Side" was one of the first songs written for the album, from the period when Young's relationship with Geffen was at a nadir and he was struggling to prioritize both his family's needs and his waning rock career. Its lyrics describe insomnia and the inability to sleep due to inner struggle and processing emotion.

=== "Hippie Dream" ===
The song "Hippie Dream" revisits and laments the apparent failure of 60s idealism. The opening lines Take my advice / Don't listen to me mirror the opening line Please take my advice of "Tired Eyes" from 1975's Tonight's the Night. Its lyrics reference creative partner David Crosby's "Wooden Ships" at a time when Crosby was facing significant personal challenges. Young explained to Rolling Stone's James Henke in June 1988: "I wrote that one for Crosby. But I guess it could have been for me, or for anybody. It's really about the excesses of our whole generation. From hippie to yuppie – I mean, it's been quite an evolution." Crosby had long been associated with the hippie movement and had performed with Young at Woodstock. In the early 1980s, Crosby had an ongoing addiction to freebase cocaine and started carrying a gun in paranoia after the assassination of John Lennon. Crosby was arrested several times on gun, drug and drunk-driving charges and ultimately spent 9 months in a Texas jail in 1985. In light of Crosby's difficulties, the lyrics of "Hippie Dream" find Young reflecting on whether the ideals of the Woodstock generation were now dead: And the Wooden Ships / Are a hippie dream / Capsized in excess / If you know what I mean. Young seems to argue that hippie idealism isn't dead, and that music will help it overcome its current challenges: Just because it's over for you / Don't mean it's over for me / It's a victory for the heart / Every time the music starts / So please don't kill the machine. Archivist Joel Bernstein and mutual friend of both artists who had attempted to help Crosby with his addictions stated for Shakey "I got chills when I heard it. 'Hippie Dream' is a great portrait of David. So cutting." In a Rockline interview, Young recalls writing the song and reaching out to Crosby:

"I had (Crosby) in mind for about five years and I kept writing different things. Then one night I wrote that. I called him up and said 'I wrote this song; you're probably going to hear it. All you have to do is prove that I didn't know what I was talking about, and I'd be a happy guy if you could do that."

According to an October 1983 Rockline interview, Young promised Crosby at the height of his problems that if Crosby got sober and overcame his addictions, Young would once again collaborate with CSNY. After coming clean during his time in prison, Crosby held Young to the promise, resulting in 1988's American Dream.

=== "Bad News Beat" ===
"Bad News Beat" finds Young taking the perspective of someone who uses surveillance to discover their partner has left them.

=== "Touch the Night" ===
"Touch the Night" is the most guitar driven song on the album. Its lyrics consider the sudden loss of a partner. Biographer Jimmy McDonough compares it to its predecessor "Like a Hurricane."

=== "People on the Street" ===
"People on the Street" empathizes with the experience of the homeless.

=== "Hard Luck Stories" ===
One of the earliest songs written for the record, the song dates from the timeframe when Young's relationship with his record company turned sour and Geffen sued him for putting out uncommercial albums. In Shakey, Young describes dealing with a lawsuit stemming from the production of his movie Human Highway plus his struggles with Geffen while trying to maintain his flailing rock music career and tending to his family needs. He would often find himself spending his days torn between acrimonious business calls and trying to maintain creativity and productivity in recording sessions.

=== "I Got a Problem" ===
The lyrics to "I Got a Problem" deal with addiction. In a post on the Neil Young Archives website, Young stated "Addiction is hell. You got to get over it. It doesn’t have to be."

=== "Pressure" ===
The song "Pressure" was the last song recorded for the album, and deals with the pressure of keeping up a public persona with lyrics that poke fun at television figures and reference Max Headroom. It is also likely influenced by Geffen's decision to cut off funding for the album sessions, leaving Young to finish the album out of pocket. It features a processed scream by drummer Jordan at the end. Young intended to release the song as a single, but the idea was rejected by Geffen

=== "Drifter" ===
The closing track does little to relieve the tension built by the preceding songs. "Drifter" appears to echo some of the sentiments of Young's previous songs "The Loner" and "Sail Away," and the feeling of release that comes with being able to escape one's situation and shift gears to a new setting. Young addresses these themes in a 1990 interview with Vox's Nick Kent:

I think I’ve just had an uncanny ability to escape. There’s no magic to it, but it’s like a little light goes on. And when the light goes on, I leave. See, I don't see change as a curse. It's just part of my makeup. Without change, the whole thing would fall apart. I'm not talking about rock and roll here; I'm talking about my life. I’ve got to keep moving somewhere. I've written some of my best songs on the move, driving on a long journey, scribbling lyrics on cigarette packets while steering. I like that style, though I tend to get pulled over a lot by traffic cops for driving erratically, heh heh. They just pop into my head, these songs and ideas, while I'm driving along, and when I get home I move over to the typewriter, and sometimes what comes out is good and sometimes it isn't; but it never stops. In a sense, it's all about running away. I've been running all my life. Where I'm going, who the fuck knows?

== Title and album cover ==
The album cover shows an excerpt of an airplane seat pocket guide with instructions on how to evacuate the plane in event of an emergency landing on a body of water. The cover represents an apparent criticism of Geffen's efforts to encourage Young to produce an album that caters to commercial tastes rather than his artistic motives. In a 1986 Rockline interview, Young explains the origin:

"I was on an airplane on the way home from a vacation after I'd finished Landing on Water. I was just reading the safety brochure; there is a plane and I noticed the graphic there down on the bottom of the page, of a plane landing on water and an illustration of how to do it. I was feeling tentative about the record and how people would like it, and I looked down at those people in the diagram, and the big plane with the water lapping up at the windows, and they are all trying to get their rafts out of the doors just right, and following the directions. It didn't look as if they had a chance. So I kind of felt like that myself."

In a 1994 interview with Spin's Greil Marcus, Young further explains:

"The cover and the title of that album, it’s directions on how to survive an insurvivable thing: how to land on water, in a jet that’s crashing. The most ridiculous damn thing you’ve ever heard of. You’re really landing on water where there’s no clear floor underneath you: everybody dies. That title was there because I knew where that album was going. I knew the process and the thought behind the people who were putting the album out; what they wanted me to do. That was me doing their method. And my title for it. Geffen tried to force me to do things—the record company, not David Geffen himself—when they saw that I was on—tangents. Ultimately, ‘Make a record that sounds like you.’ That was a very tough thing to do. But I tried to do a great record. We put everything we had into making that a great record. But I was just starting to come out of the trees at that point."

== Music videos ==
Young had plans to make a longform video directed by British film director Tim Pope, featuring each of the ten songs on the album. After Geffen Records refused to support the idea, Young decided to finance the project on his own. Ultimately, only four videos were finished - "Weight of the World", "Touch the Night", "Pressure" and "People on the Street". The videos all employ humor, with Young playing a variety of characters. In "Touch the Night", which was shot in a single continuous take, he played a local TV news reporter at the scene of an accident. In "Weight of the World" he wears a wig, moustache and business suit at a pool party; in "People on the Street" he plays a tap dancer who battles dog poop. For "Pressure," he plays a nerdy father driving a family on vacation who hits himself on the head repeatedly; during filming Young managed to knock himself out cold. According to a March 1987 article by music critic Jim Farber, the videos were intended to show different aspects of the American character. A video for "Drifter" would have featured Young as a hillbilly pig farmer with a history of incest. "Violent Side" would have featured the artist as a loner who wanders into a nuclear testing site causing a transformation into the Lone Ranger. Other videos would have featured Young as a 'wimp banker' and a 'drug crazed Greek boy.' According to Pope, "Neil’s the only person I’ve ever worked with who will jump completely in at the deep end. He really is an actor—he gets into stuff in a Method sort of way." Pope explained to Billboard "When Neil gets a bee in his bonnet about something, it`s bound to happen." Tim Pope had previously directed videos for "Wonderin'" and "Cry Cry Cry" from 1983's Everybody's Rockin' and would also direct the video for "This Town" from Broken Arrow in 1996.

== Releases ==
The album was released July 21, 1986. A promotional ad for the album in the UK featured the iconic image of Neville Chamberlain holding up a copy of the album in place of his agreement with Hitler promising "peace in our time." When asked about the ad concept in 1994, Young stated: "I didn’t have anything to do with that...but I kind of like the concept. Whoever thought of that must have been a genius. Sounds like high art to me. It does."

On April 2, 2022, a high-resolution edition of the album was released. In an April 18, 2022 article posted to Neil Young's website, engineer and producer Niko Bolas describes the process of making a new transfer from the original analog master tapes. Fans had written in to Young to question the sound quality of the album as it was originally made available on Young's Archives website. As a result, Bolas and engineer John Hausmann tracked down the master tapes and made a new transfer with significantly improved sound quality and clarity.

== Tour ==
Young's partnership with Kortchmar would result in Young sharing a ticket with Don Henley at benefit concerts in 1986. In August, Young would appear at the "Get Tough on Toxics" event in Long Beach. In October, Henley, backed by Kortchmar, would perform an acoustic set at the first Bridge School Benefit concert at Shoreline Amphitheatre in Mountain View, California. CSNY, Nils Lofgren, Bruce Springsteen, Tom Petty and Robin Williams would also perform. The benefit was organized by Young and his wife Pegi to raise funds for a local school for kids with special needs. The benefit would become an annual event with dozens of prominent musicians performing acoustic sets over the next three decades.

In the fall of 1986, Young embarked on an American tour with Crazy Horse to promote the album. "Touch the Night", "Bad News Beat", "Violent Side" and "Hippie Dream" would all feature in the setlists. The band struggled to recreate the electronic sounds of the Landing on Water tracks live. The performances required new equipment including a keyboard bass and complex computer programs. According to Poncho Sampedro in Shakey,

"We lost it almost every night. Neil was yellin’ and screamin'. All of a sudden we were thrown into this full-blown MIDI electronic techno-jive shit that we knew nothing about. The thing that bummed me out the most was, we were tryin’ to cop these other guys’ chops—Ralph playing like Steve Jordan, me tryin’ to play like Danny Kortchmar. What a joke."

The setlists would also feature several new songs that would be recorded on tour for the follow-up record, 1987's Life. The tour was the first with Crazy Horse since the 1978 Rust Never Sleeps/Live Rust tour. The "Live from a Rusted Out Garage" tour would feature much of the same atmosphere with fun sets and visual gags, this time with oversized remote controlled cockroaches and calls mid set where Young would pretend to speak with his mother. One concert, recorded for pay-per-view television broadcast, featured additional cameos from comedian Sam Kinison.

== Critical reception ==
Professional ratings
Review scores
Source	Rating
AllMusic	2/5 stars
Robert Christgau	C+
The Rolling Stone Album Guide	2.5/5 stars
Spin Alternative Record Guide	4/10

The album has received mixed reviews since its release, with the mid-80s production bearing the brunt of criticism. A contemporary review in Rolling Stone is mostly favorable, however. It compliments the freshness of the sound and the album's pop melodies, as well as the upfront drumming of Steve Jordan, while criticizing the album's dark lyrics for sometimes being simple.

People gave less charitable assessments of the album: "In this dismal piece of self-flagellation, when you come to the track about a highway accident, you've found the upbeat stuff. This is just what you need when you're headed for a desert island and have to leave behind only one album." Ralph Novak criticizes the album's dark lyrics and mocks Young's singing:

"Young might have been better off hiring a shrink to listen to all the self- pitying nonsense he tries to pass off as songs on this album. His titles suggest his one-note mood: "Hard Luck Stories", "I Got a Problem", "Violent Side", "Pressure", "Weight of the World" and "Bad News Beat". Actually, Weight of the World is relatively positive, but then Touch the Night, which sounds innocuous, is about a highway accident. ("Touch the Night" is dramatized in a video that is grisly and vulgar even by MTV standards.) It would be comforting to think that Young was only satirizing this narcissistic attitude. His lyrics, however, are hardly funny: Here comes the night/ Here comes the anger/ Hidden so deep inside/ No one can see. It doesn't help that Young's singing is so awful. He sounds like an eighth grader and a wimpy, not very musical eighth grader at that. The only lyric that deserves to be taken seriously is in "Hippie Dream": 'Take my advice/ Don't listen to me.'"

Later reviews are more balanced but hardly more favorable. Stereogum ranked the album as one of Young's worst, describing the production as a "digital mess" and charitably concedes that at least it isn't a total fiasco. Spin similarly ranks the album toward the bottom of Young's catalog, calling the release "rigid and soulless" AllMusic gives the album two out of five stars arguing the production ruins a batch of songs that were weak anyway. It does highlight Jordan's drumming and the songwriting of "Hippie Dream" as highlights, and suggests the album was a much needed step in the right direction. Though many of Young's fans have long considered the album to be a lackluster release, the album has become something of a cult favorite among others. In discussion posts on music forums and unofficial fan sites, fans advocate that the album's reputation should be reconsidered.

Neil Young's own opinions of the album have varied over the years. In 1987, he gave a frank assessment in an interview with Dave Fanning:

"It's a piece of crap. Let’s be honest about it. I don't know what to say about it, it's last year's record. They are all different. There are a couple of songs I really feel good about, but there was a lot of pressure on me during recording. I'd just been sued for being non-commercial after twenty years of making records. They were on my case about it all the time. Then they pulled the plug out and took the money away while I was recording it and said 'you can't have any more money because you are going over budget.' So I finished it myself. Basically at that point I said 'Well, here I am in L.A.; I don't like L.A. that much; I'm making a record with studio musicians. Theses guys are great guys but they don't know me very well.' The record company said that that was the way you got to do it. I'm thinking: pretty soon I'm not going to be with this record company anymore; so I had some songs and I went in and I played them, and there they are. There's some good things on that record, but if I was going to give one of my records to somebody, I don’t think that would be the one I'd give them."

In a 1988 interview with James Henke for Rolling Stone, he takes a more charitable view: "That album was like a rebirth, just me coming back to L.A. after having been secluded for so long. I was finding my rock & roll roots again. And my vibrancy as a musician. Something came alive; it was like a bear waking up." In 1994, he gave a broader perspective to Spin's Greil Marcus:

"How can you find yourself if you don't lose yourself? How can you be renewed if—if you don't get old? You can't. You have to do that. There have to be peaks and valleys, or it's boring. If I've done that, I guess it's because I believe in that part of life, and I believe that's the way things are. Even if it means temporarily sacrificing success. I don’t really give a shit. "I don't make excuses for those records. I think those records are going to stand up, in time. I don't feel the records are not as good as the records I'm doing now. I just feel that they’re not aimed at success—in any way. Yet if you put them on a wall—I look at them as if you’re walking through a museum. You see somebody's paintings. You go, 'Wow, look at this period here! Is this weird!' Especially considering what came after it and what was before it. And then you have to look at 'Well, during that period, what was the artist doing?'—and even knowing what he was doing, no one knew what was going to follow. Obviously, people considered nothing was going to follow. This was the end."

== Track listing ==
All tracks are written by Neil Young.

Side one
No.	Title	Recording date	Length
1.	"Weight of the World"	1/28/1986	3:40
2.	"Violent Side"	11/01/1985	4:22
3.	"Hippie Dream"	11/21/1985	4:11
4.	"Bad News Beat"	11/25/1985	3:18
5.	"Touch the Night"	10/29/1985	4:30

Side two
No.	Title	Recording date	Length
6.	"People on the Street"	12/4/1985	4:33
7.	"Hard Luck Stories"	1/1/1984	4:06
8.	"I Got a Problem"	8/1/1983	3:16
9.	"Pressure"	3/17/1986	2:46
10.	"Drifter"	10/30/1985	5:05

== Personnel ==
- Neil Young – harmonica, lead guitar, producer, synthesizer, vocals
- Steve Jordan – drums, synthesizer, vocals
- Danny Kortchmar – guitar, producer, synthesizer, vocals
- San Francisco Boys Chorus – vocals on tracks "Violent Side" and "Touch the Night"

Technical

- Niko Bolas – engineer, mixing
- Richard Bosworth – engineer
- Julie Last – engineer
- Laura LiPuma – design
- Louis Magor – choir director
- Tim Mulligan – engineer
- Doug Sax – mastering, original mastering
- Duane Seykora – engineer
- Bernard Shakey – art director

== Charts ==
Album

Chart (1986)	Peak position
Australian Albums (Kent Music Report)	43
Canada Top Albums/CDs (RPM)	40
Dutch Albums (Album Top 100)	34
Finnish Albums (Suomen virallinen lista)	39
Swedish Albums (Sverigetopplistan)	15
UK Albums (Official Charts)	52
US Billboard 200	46

Singles

Single	Chart	Peak position
"Touch the Night"	US Mainstream Rock	8
"Weight of the World"	US Mainstream Rock	33
