= Life (Neil Young and Crazy Horse album) =

Studio album with live recordings by Neil Young and Crazy Horse
- Released: June 30, 1987
- Recorded: November 18–19, 1986 (Note: except for "We Never Danced" on February 11, 1987, and "Cryin' Eyes" on March 20, 1987)
- Venues: Universal Amphitheatre (Universal City, California)
- Studios: Record One, Los Angeles
- Genres: Synth-rock; hard rock
- Length: 40:40
- Label: Geffen
- Producers: David Briggs & Neil Young; Jack Nitzsche & Neil Young ("We Never Danced")

Neil Young chronology
Landing on Water (1986)	Life (1987)	This Note's for You (1988)

Crazy Horse chronology
Re·ac·tor (1981)	Life (1987)	Left for Dead (1989)

Singles from Life
- 1. "Long Walk Home" / "Cryin' Eyes" Released: 1986; 2. "Mideast Vacation" / "Long Walk Home" Released: September 1987

Professional ratings
Review scores
Source	Rating
AllMusic	3/5 stars
The Village Voice	B

Life is the seventeenth studio album by Canadian-American musician Neil Young and his American backing band Crazy Horse, and it is Young's last release on the Geffen label. As with their 1979 album Rust Never Sleeps, most of the songs were recorded live with later studio overdubs. The album was released on June 30, 1987.

== Recording ==
The album largely consists of songs that Young debuted during the 1986 Live in a Rusted Out Garage Tour in support of his Landing on Water album. Backing tracks for seven of the nine tracks were recorded in concert at the Universal Amphitheatre in Universal City, CA on November 18 and 19, 1986. "Mideast Vacation", "Around the World" and "When Your Lonely Heart Breaks" were recorded on the 18th, "Inca Queen", "Too Lonely" and "Prisoners of Rock 'N' Roll" were recorded on the 19th. "Long Walk Home" is a mix of recordings from both these dates. "Cryin' Eyes" and "We Never Danced" were recorded at the Record One recording studio and further overdubs were added to the live tracks to complete the album.

James Jackson Toth of Stereogum described Life as a synth-rock album where the studio tracks feature a "digital sheen" and quirky sound effects, whereas the live tracks feature a sound similar to earlier Neil Young work. Describing the songs, he says "Prisoners of Rock and Roll" features a power pop/garage rock sound evocative of Young's subsequent album Ragged Glory (1990), whereas "When Your Lonely Heart Breaks" features production evocative of Richard Marx. "Long Walk Home", he writes, "imagines Phil Ochs confronting MIDI", whereas "Inca Queen" unusually attempts to "introduce new age to new wave."

== Songs ==
=== "Mideast Vacation" ===
The first three tracks all handle the topic of world politics, and ponder the role of the United States in the world. "Mideast Vacation" is a dream-like narrative where Young imagines experiencing warfare while on vacation abroad.

=== "Long Walk Home" ===
"Long Walk Home" empathizes with troops deployed overseas. It was originally written as "Letter from 'Nam" in the early 1970s with different lyrics concerning the experience of soldiers returning home from the Vietnam War. That track was officially released in 2020 on the Archives Volume II. For Life, Young would update the lyrics in response to the foreign policy issues of the time (Beirut, Qaddafi).

=== "Inca Queen" ===
"Inca Queen" finds Young imagining life in pre-Columbian times, much as he does on the earlier "Cortez the Killer" and "Like an Inca".

=== "Prisoners of Rock and Roll" ===
"Prisoners of Rock and Roll" finds Young protesting his relationship with his record company, with lyrics suggesting "that's why we don't wanna be good". Life would be his fifth and final album under his contract with Geffen. The cover depicts a picture of Young behind prison bars with five tally marks scratched into the wall.

=== "Cryin' Eyes" ===
"Cryin' Eyes" was first performed in 1977 with Young's short-lived collaborators The Ducks.

=== "We Never Danced" ===
"We Never Danced" had made its first appearance on the soundtrack to the 1987 film Made in Heaven, in a version sung by Martha Davis of the Motels. Young had a cameo in the film as a truck driver.

== Legacy ==
Young found new meaning in these songs in the context of the war on terror and the occupation of Iraq. During his "Freedom of Speech" tour in support of Living with War, Young posted videos of these three songs on his website. The "Mideast Vacation" and "Long Walk Home" videos were later released on the DVD included with the album Living with War: In the Beginning. The performances are from his 1986 tour with Crazy Horse and are labeled as being "From Neil Young Archives Volume 3," a perennially unreleased box set in a series of such collections eventually promised to chronicle Young's entire career. However, when this volume finally was released in September 2024, it did not include the three tracks. The performance of "Inca Queen", without overdubs, from November 19, 1986, is available at the Neil Young Archives as an out-take of the album.

== Track listing ==
All tracks are written by Neil Young.

Side one
No.	Title	Length
1.	"Mideast Vacation"	4:20
2.	"Long Walk Home"	4:56
3.	"Around the World"	5:25
4.	"Inca Queen"	7:58

Side two
No.	Title	Length
5.	"Too Lonely"	2:48
6.	"Prisoners of Rock 'N' Roll"	3:12
7.	"Cryin' Eyes"	2:52
8.	"When Your Lonely Heart Breaks"	5:16
9.	"We Never Danced"	3:37

== Personnel ==
Track numbering refers to CD and digital releases of the album.

- Neil Young – vocals, guitar, harmonica, keyboards, production

Crazy Horse

- Poncho Sampedro – guitar, keyboards, backing vocals
- Billy Talbot – bass, keyboards, backing vocals
- Ralph Molina – drums, backing vocals

Additional

- Jack Nitzsche – entire backing track (9)

Technical

- David Briggs – production (1–8)
- Jack Nitzsche – production (9)
- Bryan Bell – programming, synth-bank
- Michael Hoenig – programming (9)
- Niko Bolas – recording (1–6, 8, 9), mixing (1–4, 9)
- Coke Johnson – recording (7), mixing (5–8)
- Tim Mulligan – engineering
- Richard Landers – engineering
- Brian Soucy – engineering
- Chris Bellman – mastering

== Charts ==
Chart (1987)	Peak position
Canada Top Albums/CDs (RPM)	42
Dutch Albums (Album Top 100)	37
Swedish Albums (Sverigetopplistan)	9
UK Albums (Official Charts)	71
US Billboard 200	75
