= At Crooked Lake =

Studio album by Crazy Horse
- Released: October 1972
- Genres: Rock; country rock
- Length: 34:01
- Label: Epic
- Producers: Crazy Horse; Ronald Stone

Crazy Horse chronology
Loose (1972)	At Crooked Lake (1972)	Zuma (1975)

Professional ratings
Review scores
Source	Rating
AllMusic	2.5/5 stars
Christgau's Record Guide	B−

At Crooked Lake is a 1972 album released by the group Crazy Horse. The album marked the departure of guitarist and former Rockets member George Whitsell, as well as organ player John Blanton. In their place for this album were Rick and Michael Curtis.

Record World said that the album "often successfully recaptures the early-middle Byrds sound."

Record World reviewed the single "Rock and Roll Band" and said that "always known for quality material and performance, group could be ready to break."

== Track listing ==
Side one
No.	Title	Writer(s)	Length
1.	"Rock And Roll Band"	Sydney Jordon	3:10
2.	"Love Is Gone"	Rick Curtis, Mike Curtis	3:17
3.	"We Ride"	Rick Curtis	3:16
4.	"Outside Lookin' In"	Greg Leroy	2:05
5.	"Don't Keep Me Burning"	Rick Curtis	4:21

Side two
No.	Title	Writer(s)	Length
6.	"Vehicle"	Rick Curtis	3:50
7.	"Your Song"	Greg Leroy	2:47
8.	"Lady Soul"	Mike Curtis	3:41
9.	"Don't Look Back"	Rick Curtis	3:31
10.	"85 El Paso's"	Greg Leroy	5:00

== Personnel ==
- Billy Talbot - bass, backing vocals
- Ralph Molina - drums, backing vocals
- Greg Leroy - guitars, bottleneck guitar, lead and backing vocals
- Michael Curtis - organ, guitars, mandolin, piano, lead and backing vocals
- Rick Curtis - banjo, guitars, lead and backing vocals

=== Additional personnel ===
- "Sneaky" Pete Kleinow - pedal steel
- Patti Moan - vocals
- Bobby Notkoff - violin
- Ronald Stone - producer
- David Brown - engineer
- Johnny Pacheco - conductor
