= Left for Dead (Crazy Horse album) =

Studio album by Crazy Horse
- Released: 1989
- Studios: Sonora West Studios, Elbee Studios (Glendale, California)
- Genres: Hard rock; rock
- Length: 36:18
- Label: Heyday Records
- Producer: Crazy Horse

Crazy Horse chronology
Life (1987)	Left for Dead (1989)	Ragged Glory (1990)

Left for Dead is a 1989 album released by the group Crazy Horse.

For the last Crazy Horse studio album until the iTunes-only release Trick Horse in 2009, Billy Talbot and Ralph Molina teamed up with singer/songwriter/guitarist Sonny Mone.

Made while Crazy Horse guitarist Frank "Poncho" Sampedro was otherwise engaged with Neil Young (having been the only member of Crazy Horse that Young did not fire from his late-eighties band the Bluenotes), Left For Dead was the first Crazy Horse album in 11 years and the album's title was a defiant statement of alienation felt by the other band members having been left behind. In 1990, Talbot and Molina would again reunite with Young and Sampedro for Ragged Glory.

== Track listing ==
No.	Title	Writer(s)	Length
1.	"Left For Dead"	Sonny Mone	4:19
2.	"Child Of War"	Mone	3:34
3.	"You And I"	Billy Talbot, Matt Piucci	2:45
4.	"Mountain Man"	Mone	3:06
5.	"In The Middle"	Jerry Conforti, Molina, Talbot	4:55
6.	"If I Ever Do"	Mone	3:12
7.	"World Of Love"	Mone	4:30
8.	"Show A Little Faith"	Mone	4:48

1990 reissue bonus track
No.	Title	Writer(s)	Length
4.	"I Could Never Lose Your Love"	Mone	5:09

== Personnel ==
Crazy Horse

- Billy Talbot - bass, keyboards, vocals
- Ralph Molina - drums, vocals
- Sonny Mone - lead vocals, guitar
- Matt Piucci - lead guitar, vocals

Additional personnel

- Dino Papanicolaou - Hammond organ, piano
- Jimmy Mitchell - engineer
- Richard "Bonzo" Agron - production assistant
- Mark Humphreys - production assistant
- D. Hall - art direction
