= Scratchy: The Complete Reprise Recordings =

Compilation album by Crazy Horse
- Released: Nov 29, 2005
- Genre: Rock; hard rock; country rock
- Label: Rhino Handmade

Crazy Horse chronology
Gone Dead Train: The Best of Crazy Horse 1971–1989 (2005)	Scratchy: The Complete Reprise Recordings (2005)	Live at the Fillmore East (2006)

Professional ratings
Review scores
Source	Rating
AllMusic	4.5/5 stars
The Encyclopedia of Popular Music	3/5 stars

Scratchy: The Complete Reprise Recordings is a 2005 compilation album released by the group Crazy Horse. It is a re-issue of the first two Crazy Horse albums, Crazy Horse and Loose, on Reprise Records, with bonus tracks and the first single by the pre-Crazy Horse group Danny & The Memories.

The album went out of print in 2006. It was briefly released in Europe in 2006 under the title The Complete Reprise Recordings 1971–'73, without the Danny & The Memories single. In 2013, Wounded Bird licensed the release and reissued the album using the original track listing and mastering. The booklet from the original release was replaced by a four-page booklet with credits for the album.

== Track listing ==
=== Disc One ===
1. "Gone Dead Train" (Nitzsche, Titelman) – 4:06
2. "Dance, Dance, Dance" (Young) – 2:10
3. "Look at All the Things" (Whitten) – 3:13
4. "Beggar's Day" (Lofgren) – 4:28
5. "I Don't Want to Talk About It" (Whitten) – 5:18
6. "Downtown" (Whitten, Young) – 3:14
7. "Carolay" (Nitzsche, Titelman) – 2:52
8. "Dirty, Dirty" (Whitten) – 3:31
9. "Nobody" (Lofgren) – 2:35
10. "I'll Get By" (Whitten) – 3:08
11. "Crow Jane Lady" (Nitzsche) – 4:24
12. "Hit and Run" (Blanton) – 2:42
13. "Try" (Whitsell) – 3:18
14. "One Thing I Love" (Leroy) – 2:37
15. "Move" (Whitsell) – 3:14
16. "All Alone Now" (Whitsell) – 2:47
17. "All the Little Things" (Leroy) – 5:01
18. "Fair Weather Friend" (Leroy) – 2:42
19. "You Won't Miss Me" (Whitsell) – 2:47
20. "Going Home" (Leroy) – 2:50
21. "I Don't Believe It" (Whitsell) – 3:07
22. "Kind of Woman" (Blanton) – 4:25
23. "One Sided Love" (Whitsell) – 3:12
24. "And She Won't Even Blow Smoke in My Direction" (Whitsell) – 1:21

=== Disc Two ===
1. "Dirty, Dirty" (Alternate Version) – 2:42
2. "Scratchy" (Takes 1–3) – 12:47
3. "Dear Song Singer" – 2:50
4. "Downtown" (Unedited Long Version) – 10:42
5. "Susie's Song" (Takes 1–5) – 4:25
6. "When You Dance You Can Really Love" – 3:12
7. "Radio Spot" – 1:21
8. "Can't Help Loving That Girl of Mine" – 45 rpm single by Danny & The Memories – 3:54
9. "Don't Go" – 45 rpm single by Danny & The Memories – 2:02
