= Landing on water =

Landing on water could be:

- Water landing, any landing on water, also a euphemism for crash-landing into water in an aircraft
- Landing on Water, an album by Neil Young released in 1986
