= Loose (Crazy Horse album) =

Studio album by Crazy Horse
- Released: January 1972
- Genre: Rock; country rock
- Length: 40:03
- Label: Reprise
- Producer: Fred Catero; Crazy Horse

Crazy Horse chronology
Crazy Horse (1971)	Loose (1972)	At Crooked Lake (1972)

Professional ratings
Review scores
Source	Rating
AllMusic	2.5/5 stars
Christgau's Record Guide	D+

Loose is the second studio album by the American rock band Crazy Horse, the follow-up to their self-titled debut. It was released in January 1972. It marked the departure of founding guitarist Danny Whitten, as well as Jack Nitzsche and Nils Lofgren. In their place for this album were George Whitsell and Greg Leroy on guitars, and John Blanton on organ.

== Track listing ==
Side one
No.	Title	Writer(s)	Length
1.	"Hit And Run"	John Blanton	2:42
2.	"Try"	George Whitsell	3:19
3.	"One Thing I Love"	Greg Leroy	2:40
4.	"Move"	Whitsell	3:15
5.	"All Alone Now"	Whitsell	2:52
6.	"All The Little Things"	Leroy	5:05

Side two
No.	Title	Writer(s)	Length
7.	"Fair Weather Friend"	Leroy	2:42
8.	"You Won't Miss Me"	Whitsell	2:48
9.	"I Don't Believe It"	Leroy	2:53
10.	"Going Home"	Whitsell	3:06
11.	"Kind Of Woman"	Blanton	4:26
12.	"One Sided Love"	Whitsell	3:11
13.	"And She Won't Even Blow Smoke In My Direction"	Whitsell	1:26

== Personnel ==
Crazy Horse

- George Whitsell - electric and acoustic guitars, lead and backing vocals, congas
- Greg Leroy - electric, acoustic and slide guitars, lead and backing vocals
- John Blanton - organ, lead and backing vocals, piano, harmonica, cello
- Billy Talbot - bass, backing vocals
- Ralph Molina - drums, backing vocals, acoustic guitar

Additional personnel

- Joel Tepp - harmonica (13)

=== Production ===
- Fred Catero - producer/engineer
- Crazy Horse - producer
