= Zuma (Neil Young and Crazy Horse album) =

Studio album by Neil Young and Crazy Horse
- Released: November 10, 1975
- Recorded: June 16, 1974 – August 29, 1975
- Studios: Broken Arrow Ranch; Redwood City, California; Pt. Dume, California
- Genres: Country rock; hard rock; acoustic rock
- Length: 36:34
- Label: Reprise
- Producers: Neil Young and David Briggs; Neil Young and Tim Mulligan ("Pardon My Heart", "Lookin' for a Love", and "Through My Sails")

Neil Young chronology
Tonight's the Night (1975)	Zuma (1975)	Long May You Run (1976)

Crazy Horse chronology
At Crooked Lake (1972)	Zuma (1975)	Crazy Moon (1978)

Singles from Zuma
- 1. "Lookin' for a Love" / "Sugar Mountain" Released: 1975; 2. "Stupid Girl" / "Drive Back" Released: 1976

Zuma, the seventh studio album by Canadian/American musician Neil Young, was released on Reprise Records in November 1975. It was the first album co-credited to Neil Young and Crazy Horse in six years and the first with Frank Sampedro on rhythm guitar, following the death of Danny Whitten in 1972. A continuation of the country rock and heavy rock sound established on Everybody Knows This Is Nowhere, Zuma includes "Cortez the Killer", one of Young's best-known songs with Crazy Horse.

== Background ==
Zuma was the first album released after the so-called Ditch Trilogy, consisting of the albums Time Fades Away, On the Beach and Tonight's the Night. The death of former Crazy Horse guitarist and bandmate Danny Whitten from an alcohol/diazepam overdose in 1972 affected Neil Young greatly and contributed to a hiatus of Crazy Horse.

Late in 1973, Young went on tour with the Crazy Horse rhythm section of bassist Billy Talbot and drummer Ralph Molina; the multi-instrumentalist Nils Lofgren, who had played on Young's After the Gold Rush (1970) before joining the Whitten-led iteration of Crazy Horse from 1970 to 1971; and the Stray Gators holdover Ben Keith. This group, initially billed as Crazy Horse at its first engagements, became known as the Santa Monica Flyers. They recorded most of the tracks on Tonight's the Night (1975).

After the 1974 stadium tour with Crosby, Stills & Nash and another abandoned attempt at a second CSNY studio album, Young reformed Crazy Horse in 1975 with rhythm guitarist Frank Sampedro alongside Talbot and Molina. Aside from a brief period in the late 1980s, this line-up would remain stable until 2014, when Sampedro retired as a professional musician. He was eventually replaced in 2018 by Lofgren.

== Writing ==
The songs on Zuma are a mix of the personal and the abstract, inspired by Neil Young's recent breakup with Carrie Snodgress and various contemporaneous dreams. In a June 1975 interview, he said, "It's about the Incas and the Aztecs. It takes on another personality. It's like being in another civilization. It's a lost sort of form, sort of a soul-form that switches from history scene to history scene trying to find itself, man, in this maze." Young noted on his website that the melody and lyrics of "Don't Cry No Tears" are partially derived from "I Wonder", which he wrote in high school. Early recordings of the original were included on Neil Young Archives Vol. 1 (1963–1972) (2009).

In "Danger Bird", Young interpolates sections of a previous song called "L.A. Girls and Ocean Boys" about the breakup with Snodgress, specifically the lines, "'Cause you've been with another man / There you are and here I am." In the biography Shakey, Young described it as "a wild song. It's so slow and great. Isn't it slow? Briggs always wanted to remix it. I like the mix. A combination of two songs... I'll be writin' another and say, 'Oh, that fits.' Bang! Drop it right in." Young released a piano demo of "L.A. Girls and Ocean Boys" on Neil Young Archives Volume II: 1972–1976 (2020). "Pardon My Heart" was also inspired by the deterioration of Young's relationship with Snodgress and dates from the spring of 1974. At his solo acoustic performance at the Bottom Line that year, he introduced it as "a song I learned recently. I wrote it too. This is a love song. It's one of the saddest love songs I've ever heard."

Young wrote "Barstool Blues" after returning from a bar, but said when he woke up, "I couldn't remember writing it. I couldn't remember any of it. I started playin' the chords and it was so fuckin' high - I mean, it was three steps higher than the fuckin' record." The lyrics to "Cortez the Killer" were first written in high school, according to a story Young told an audience in 1996: "One night I stayed up too late when I was goin' to high school. I ate like six hamburgers or something. I felt terrible, very bad... and in the morning I woke up and I'd written this song." In 1995, he told rock critic Nick Kent that Hernán Cortés represents "the explorer with two sides, one benevolent, the other utterly ruthless. I mean, look at Columbus! Everyone now knows he was less than great. And he wasn't even there first. It always makes me question all these other so-called 'icons'." Young speculated that Cortez "[might] not have felt as good about [killing all those people] as he did when he was just dancing across the water in his boat. I have to think that changed his life, that experience. That he was not able to sleep well."

"Through My Sails" dates from 1974 sessions at Young's ranch during rehearsals for that year's stadium tour with CSNY, who perform backing vocals on the track. Like his CSNY bandmates, Young is an avid sailor, and would purchase his own sailboat in the mid-1970s.

== Recording ==
The sessions for the album were a prolific time for Young, and a fresh start for him personally. He was newly single, having recently split with Carrie Snodgress. He and the re-formed Crazy Horse moved into David Briggs' house near Point Dume and Zuma Beach in Malibu, California, from which the album takes its name. In his memoir Special Deluxe, Young recalls that the setup in the garage "was tight and comfortable". Briggs recounted that they had "cut big pieces of foam for the windows", and then "just set up, recorded, and I mixed 'em on the spot. That's why those records sound so crude and elementary... Neil's a lot better in houses than he is in studios."

The band tried out many new songs, some of which would be revisited for Rust Never Sleeps. Songs performed during the Zuma sessions that did not make the album include "Pocahontas", "Sedan Delivery", "Hitchhiker", "Ride My Llama", "Powderfinger", "Hawaii", "Kansas" and "Born to Run". In 1975, Young told Cameron Crowe that the songs were "about Peru, the Aztecs and the Incas. Time travel stuff. We've got one song called "Marlon Brando, John Ehrlichman, Pocahontas and Me"". He anticipated wrapping the sessions quickly and embarking on a tour. "I couldn't be happier. That, combined with the bachelor life... I feel magnificent. Now is the first time I can remember coming out of a relationship, definitely not wanting to get into another one". In his 2012 memoir, Waging Heavy Peace, Young recalls how they "kept playing day after day and partying at night", and noted the tracks he chose to hold back. "Today I like listening to all of those tracks together in a compilation I call Dume that is in The Archives Volume 2. Those were some of the finest, most alive days of my life. I was getting past the lost relationship with Carrie, living the life with my best friends, making some good music, and starting to get a grip on something: an open future in my personal life and a new future with Crazy Horse after Danny."

Poncho Sampedro also recalled the Zuma sessions fondly, in March 2021 telling Stereogum that the band "didn't have a concept in mind. It wasn't going to be this or that. It was all just wide open. We were just playing and recording, and we didn't know what people did with the recordings. We just kept making new ones". One of the first songs recorded for the album was "Cortez the Killer", when a power surge resulted in one verse not being recorded. Young's reaction to hearing of this was that he "never liked that verse anyway." In 1990, Young told Nick Kent that "[you] can hear the splice on the recording where we stop and start again. It's a messy edit. It was a total accident. But that's how I see my best art, as one magical accident after another." Poncho Sampedro recalled that the band "just played the whole thing and that was the take... We did lose the third verse. Something about 'a rocky grave.' Neil never sang it again." Young rediscovered the lost verse and performed it for the first time in April 2024.

"Stupid Girl" features double-tracked lead vocals, with one pitched low and the other high. Young explains in a 1988 interview: "I recorded it with Crazy Horse at 4 o’clock in the morning. We were all messed up and did the track, all the vocals and everything, all in one shot. But when I listened to it with just the low vocal, I said, 'That sounds too dark.' So I added the high one." Towards the end of the sessions, Young and the band revisited a pair of acoustic tracks he had recorded in June 1974 during rehearsals for the CSNY tour that year. Electric guitar and backing vocals were added to "Pardon My Heart", which was added to the album's sequencing in between the newly recorded full band cuts, along with "Through My Sails".

The sessions were notable for the many visitors they attracted, including Rod Stewart, Britt Ekland and Bob Dylan. In an April 2021 Aquarium Drunkard interview, Frank Sampedro recounted that Young called the band outside, saying: ""Check this out. There's a van parked in the driveway. This guy is listening to us. Check it out", and it was Dylan. Dylan lived around the corner... and then he came in and played with us one day... I wish we would have got "Tangled Up In Blue" because I was having a blast playing that song. But somebody kept missing one of the changes. Neil was killin' it with the lead guitar. We all had big smiles on our faces. We just weren't that accomplished of a band to pick up a song in three minutes." Dylan gave Young some feedback. "When he heard "Hitchhiker," a confessional about the progressive history of drugs I had taken through my life, he told me, "That's honest." That moment still crosses my mind. It makes me laugh every time I think of it because Bob's humor is so wry. I think it was his way of saying kindly that the song was not very inventive as far as creating a story goes".

== Reception ==
Professional ratings
Review scores
Source	Rating
AllMusic	4.5/5 stars
Christgau's Record Guide	A−
Encyclopedia of Popular Music	4/5 stars
The Great Rock Discography	8/10
MusicHound Rock	4/5
Pitchfork	8.7/10
The Rolling Stone Album Guide	4.5/5 stars
Spin Alternative Record Guide	9/10
Tom Hull	B+

Upon release, it peaked at #25 on the Billboard 200. In 1997, the album received a RIAA gold certification. The album has received acclaim since its release. Robert Christgau enjoyed the album and rated it A−, explaining, "Young has violated form so convincingly over the past three years that this return may take a little getting used to. In fact, its relative neatness and control--relative to Y, not C, S, N,(Crosby, Stills, Nash and Young) etc.--compromises the sprawling blockbuster cuts, "Danger Bird" and "Cortez the Killer." But the less ambitious tunes--"Pardon My Heart," say--are as pretty as the best of After the Gold Rush, yet very rough. Which is a neat trick."

In 2000, it was voted number 410 in Colin Larkin's All Time Top 1000 Albums.

== Track listing ==
All tracks are written by Neil Young.

=== Side one ===
1. "Don't Cry No Tears" (2:34)
  - Neil Young – guitar, vocal; Frank “Poncho” Sampedro – guitar; Billy Talbot – bass, vocal; Ralph Molina – drums, vocal
  - Recorded at House, Point Dume, CA, 6/1/1975. Produced by David Briggs & Neil Young.
2. "Danger Bird" (6:54)
  - Neil Young – guitar, vocal; Frank “Poncho” Sampedro – guitar; Billy Talbot – bass, vocal; Ralph Molina – drums, vocal
  - Recorded at House, Point Dume, CA, 6/3/1975. Produced by David Briggs & Neil Young.
3. "Pardon My Heart" (3:49)
  - Neil Young – guitar, piano, vocal; Tim Drummond – bass; Billy Talbot – vocal; Ralph Molina – vocal
  - Recorded at Studio, Broken Arrow Ranch, 6/16/1974 with overdubs 8/29/1975. Produced by Neil Young & Tim Mulligan.
4. "Lookin' for a Love" (3:17)
  - Neil Young – guitar, vocal; Frank “Poncho” Sampedro – guitar; Billy Talbot – bass, vocal; Ralph Molina – drums, vocal
  - Recorded at Studio, Broken Arrow Ranch, 8/29/1975. Produced by Neil Young & Tim Mulligan.
5. "Barstool Blues" (3:02)
  - Neil Young – guitar, vocal; Frank “Poncho” Sampedro – guitar; Billy Talbot – bass, vocal; Ralph Molina – drums, vocal
  - Recorded at House, Point Dume, CA, 6/3/1975. Produced by David Briggs & Neil Young.

=== Side two ===
1. "Stupid Girl" (3:13)
  - Neil Young – guitar, vocal; Frank “Poncho” Sampedro – guitar; Billy Talbot – bass, vocal; Ralph Molina – drums, vocal
  - Recorded at House, Point Dume, CA, 6/8/1975. Produced by David Briggs & Neil Young.
2. "Drive Back" (3:32)
  - Neil Young – guitar, vocal; Frank “Poncho” Sampedro – guitar; Billy Talbot – bass, vocal; Ralph Molina – Drums, vocal
  - Recorded at House, Point Dume, CA, 6/22/1975. Produced by David Briggs & Neil Young.
3. "Cortez the Killer" (7:29)
  - Neil Young – guitar, vocal; Frank “Poncho” Sampedro – guitar; Billy Talbot – bass, vocal; Ralph Molina – drums, vocal
  - Recorded at House, Point Dume, CA, 5/22/1975. Produced by David Briggs & Neil Young.
4. "Through My Sails" (2:41)
  - Neil Young – guitar, vocal; Stephen Stills – bass, vocal; David Crosby – vocal; Graham Nash – vocal; Russ Kunkel – congas
  - Recorded at Studio, Broken Arrow Ranch, 6/17/1974. Produced by Neil Young & Tim Mulligan.

== Personnel ==
- Neil Young – vocals, guitars, piano

Crazy Horse

- Frank Sampedro – rhythm guitar (all tracks except "Pardon My Heart" and "Through My Sails")
- Billy Talbot – bass (all tracks except "Pardon My Heart" and "Through My Sails"), backing vocals (all tracks except "Through My Sails")
- Ralph Molina – drums (all tracks except "Pardon My Heart" and "Through My Sails"), backing vocals (all tracks except "Through My Sails")

Additional musicians

- Tim Drummond – bass ("Pardon My Heart")
- Stephen Stills – bass, backing vocals ("Through My Sails")
- David Crosby, Graham Nash – backing vocals ("Through My Sails")
- Russ Kunkel – congas ("Through My Sails")

Technical

- Mazzeo – cover artwork
- George Horn – mastering
- Elliot Roberts – direction

== Charts ==
1975 chart performance for Zuma
Chart (1975)	Peak position
Australia (Kent Music Report)	44
US Billboard Top LPs & Tape	25
UK Album Charts	44
Canadian RPM 100 Albums	69
Finnish Album Charts	27
French Album Charts	13
Japanese Album Charts	84
Spain Album Charts	13
New Zealand Album Charts	35
Dutch MegaCharts Albums	4
US Cash Box Top 100 Albums	25
US Record World Album Chart	30

2025 chart performance for Zuma
Chart (2025)	Peak position
Greek Albums (IFPI)	59

== Certifications ==
Region	Certification	Certified units/sales
United Kingdom (BPI)	Silver	60,000^{^}
United States (RIAA)	Gold	500,000^{^}
^{^} Shipments figures based on certification alone.
