= Crazy Moon =

Crazy Moon may refer to:

- Crazy Moon (film), a 1987 film
- Crazy Moon (album), a 1978 by Crazy Horse
