= Old Ways =

Studio album by Neil Young
- Released: August 12, 1985
- Recorded: January 1983 – April 1985
- Venues: The Opry, Austin, Texas
- Studios: House of David, Nashville; The Castle, Franklin, Tennessee; Pedernales Recording, Spicewood, Texas
- Genres: Country; country rock
- Length: 36:43
- Label: Geffen
- Producers: Neil Young; David Briggs; Ben Keith; Elliot Mazer

Neil Young chronology
Everybody's Rockin' (1983)	Old Ways (1985)	Landing on Water (1986)

Singles from Old Ways
- 1. "Are There Any More Real Cowboys?" / "I'm a Memory" Released: 1985; 2. "Get Back to the Country" / "Misfits" Released: September 1985; 3. "Old Ways" / "Once an Angel" Released: February 1986

Professional ratings
Review scores
Source	Rating
AllMusic	3/5 stars
Robert Christgau	B
Kerrang!	0.5/5 stars
Rolling Stone	(favorable)

Old Ways is the fifteenth studio album by Canadian-American musician and singer-songwriter Neil Young, released on August 12, 1985, by Geffen Records. He recorded several songs at producer David Briggs' Nashville recording studio House of David with long-time collaborators Ben Keith, Tim Drummond, Karl T. Himmel, Spooner Oldham and Rufus Thibodeaux, in January 1983. Young went into Castle Recording Studios, Tennessee, in March 1985 with both the musicians from the earlier Harvest album and various local studio musicians, to complete the album. He duets with Waylon Jennings on "Bound for Glory", and with Willie Nelson on "Are There Any More Real Cowboys?".

== Background ==
Young first made an attempt at a country album in January 1983. He recorded several songs at producer David Briggs' Nashville recording studio House of David with long-time collaborators Ben Keith, Tim Drummond, Karl T. Himmel, Spooner Oldham and Rufus Thibodeaux, who had all previously backed Young on Comes a Time from 1978. The songs "Old Ways", "Depression Blues", "California Sunset", "My Boy", "Are There Any More Real Cowboys?" and "Silver and Gold" all date from these sessions. After turning in Trans and the unreleased Island in the Sun in 1982, Young's record label, Geffen, objected to a country album, asking Young for a "rock 'n roll" record, which Young gave them in the form of 1983's Everybody's Rockin'. "Depression Blues" later appeared on Young's Geffen-era compilation Lucky Thirteen, while "Silver and Gold" appeared as the title track of an album in 2000. Young describes this first effort in a June 1988 Rolling Stone interview with James Henke:

There was a whole other record, the original Old Ways, which Geffen rejected. It was like Harvest II. It was a combination of the musicians from Harvest and Comes a Time. It was done in Nashville in only a few days, basically the same way Harvest was done, and it was co-produced by Elliot Mazer, who produced Harvest. There's Harvest, Comes a Time and Old Ways I, which is more of a Neil Young record than Old Ways II. Old Ways II was more of a country record – which was a direct result of being sued for playing country music. The more they tried to stop me, the more I did it. Just to let them know that no one's gonna tell me what to do. I was so stoked about that record. I sent them a tape of it that had eight songs on it. I called them up a week later, 'cause I hadn't heard anything, and they said, "Well, frankly, Neil, this record scares us a lot. We don't think this is the right direction for you to be going in." ... They didn't look at me as an artist; they looked at me as a product, and this product didn't fit in with their marketing scheme.

In 1984, Young toured with the band from the 1983 sessions. The tour included an appearance on the Austin City Limits TV show and would eventually be chronicled on the live album A Treasure in 2011. Young saw country music and his adopted country music persona as a respite from his then-waning career in rock music, the demands of his record company, and his struggles to record the rock album that would become Landing on Water. He explained to the Melody Maker's Adam Sweeting in a September 1985 interview: "In some ways rock 'n' roll has let me down. It really doesn't leave you a way to grow old gracefully and continue to work. If you're gonna rock you better burn out, 'cause that's the way they wanna see you."

== Recording ==
In Spring 1985, Young returned to the studio to record a country music album. During sessions at various Nashville studios, over a dozen new songs were recorded with both his longtime collaborators and local studio musicians as well as Waylon Jennings. The sessions featured many of the musicians from the earlier Harvest and Comes a Time albums. Additionally, Willie Nelson added vocals and guitar to the 1983 recording of "Are There Any More Real Cowboys?" at his Lake Travis recording studio, making the song into a duet. Outtakes from the 1985 sessions include "Amber Jean", "Beautiful Bluebird" and "Let Your Fingers Do the Walking", among others.

== Songs ==
Many of the songs on the album reflect a sense of contentment with family life. "Once an Angel" is a tribute to his wife, Pegi, while "My Boy" is an ode to his son, Zeke. In a 2020 posting on his Archives website, Young describes "My Boy" as "probably the most soulful recording I have ever made." The outtake "Amber Jean" celebrates the birth of his newborn daughter. Another outtake, "Silver and Gold" also reflects his seeming satisfaction with family life, while "California Sunset" is dedicated to his adopted home.

"The Wayward Wind" is a cover of a 1955 Gogi Grant song that Young remembers, in a version by Frankie Laine, from his childhood in Ontario; the song brings back important memories for him: "I always remember that same stretch of road, the railroad tracks, the whole thing—every time I hear that song, it comes right back. That feeling when you're young and open, you have all these ideas. Real wide view. I dug the song a lot. You can really get lost in it."

"Misfits (Dakota)" offers surreal lyrics about space station astronauts and Muhammad Ali. Young explains how quickly the song came about in a 1985 interview with Adam Sweeting for the Melody Maker: "It only took me a few minutes to write it. I picked up my electric guitar one night in the studio, I was by myself and I turned it up real loud and started playing and, I wrote it just that night."

"Bound for Glory" is a ballad that tells the tale of an affair between a long-distance truck driver and a lone hitchhiker. Young recounts in a 1986 interview with Bill Flanagan: "I wrote that one on a little word processor in the back of my bus while I was rolling. I wrote it with a couple of beers and a little smoke. The bus was rolling down the road and I typed it out and I knew the melody in my head already. That's my favorite one on the Old Ways album."

== Promotion ==
The partnership with Willie Nelson and Young's delve into the country world would have a lasting impact on the artist's interest in the financial plight of small scale family farmers. Young, Nelson and John Mellencamp would found the Farm Aid organization, performing benefit concerts almost every year in the subsequent decades. Young made plans to release an EP to promote the Farm Aid cause, but the idea was rejected by Geffen Records. Some of the songs from the project were eventually released on A Treasure.

== Track listing ==
All tracks are written by Neil Young, except "The Wayward Wind", by Herb Newman, Stanley Lebowsky.

Side one
No.	Title	Duet with	Length
1.	"The Wayward Wind" (^)	Denise Draper	3:12
2.	"Get Back to the Country" (^)		2:50
3.	"Are There Any More Real Cowboys?" (*)	Willie Nelson	3:03
4.	"Once an Angel" (^)		3:55
5.	"Misfits" (^)		5:07

Side two
No.	Title	Duet with	Length
6.	"California Sunset" (^{§})		2:56
7.	"Old Ways" (^)		3:08
8.	"My Boy" (*)		3:37
9.	"Bound for Glory" (^)	Waylon Jennings	5:48
10.	"Where Is the Highway Tonight?" (^)		3:02

^Recorded at Castle Recording Studios, Franklin, Tennessee, March 1985
*Recorded at House of David, Nashville, Jan 1983
^{§}Recorded live on Austin City Limits TV show, Sept 1984

== Personnel ==
- Neil Young – guitar, banjo-guitar, harmonica, vocals
- Waylon Jennings – guitar, vocals
- Willie Nelson – guitar, vocals
- Rufus Thibodeaux – fiddle
- Ben Keith – pedal steel guitar, dobro
- Tim Drummond – bass
- Karl Himmel – drums
- Joe Allen – electric & upright bass
- Ralph Mooney – pedal steel guitar
- Hargus "Pig" Robbins – piano
- Gordon Terry – fiddle
- Joe Osborn – bass
- Anthony Crawford – mandolin, vocals
- Terry McMillan – harmonica, jew's harp
- Béla Fleck – banjo
- Bobby Thompson – banjo
- David Kirby – guitar
- Grant Boatwright – guitar
- Johnny Christopher – guitar
- Ray Edenton – guitar
- Gove Scrivenor – autoharp
- Farrell Morris – percussion
- Marty Stuart – mandolin
- Carl Gorodetzky – violin
- Spooner Oldham – piano
- Larry Byrom – vocals
- Rick Palombi – vocals
- Doana Cooper – vocals
- Denise Draper – vocals
- Gail Davies – vocals
- Betsy Hammer – vocals
- Pam Rose – vocals
- Janis Oliver-Gill – vocals
- Mary Ann Kennedy – vocals
- Kristine Oliver-Arnold – vocals
- Leona Williams – vocals
- Strings:
  - Carl Gorodetsky – leader
  - George Binkley
  - John Borg
  - Roy Christensen
  - Virginia Christensen
  - Charles Everett
  - Larry Harvin
  - Mark Hembree
  - Lee Larrison
  - Betty McDonald
  - Dennis Molchan
  - Pamela Sixfin
  - Mark Tanner
  - David Vanderkooi
  - Gary Vanosdale
  - Carol Walker
  - Stephanie Woolf
- JT Cantwell – assistant engineer

Recording personnel

- Neil Young – producer
- Ben Keith – producer
- David Briggs – producer
- Gene Eichelberger – engineer
- Keith Odle – second engineer
- Clark Schleicher – recording assistant
- J.T. Cantwell – recording assistant

== Chart performance ==
Chart (1985)	Peak position
Canada Top Albums/CDs (RPM)	31
Dutch Albums (Album Top 100)	25
Finnish Albums (Suomen virallinen lista)	17
New Zealand Albums (RMNZ)	29
Swedish Albums (Sverigetopplistan)	13
UK Albums (Official Charts)	39
US Billboard 200	75
US Top Country Albums (Billboard)	24
