= Insane Asylum (album) =

Studio album by Kathi McDonald
- Released: February 1974
- Genre: Blue-eyed soul; blues rock; rock & roll
- Label: Capitol
- Producer: David Briggs

Kathi McDonald chronology
Insane Asylum (1974)	Save Your Breath (1994)

Singles from Insane Asylum
- 1. "Freak Lover" Released: February 1974; 2. "Bogart to Bowie" Released: April 1974

Insane Asylum is the debut album by American blues rock singer Kathi McDonald. The album was released on Capitol Records in February 1974.

== Background ==
Anacortes, Washington native Kathi McDonald played in several bands around the Pacific Northwest in the 1960s. She got her first professional experience recording with Ike & Tina Turner as an Ikette. She recorded with Leon Russell as part of his Shelter People and trouped along with Joe Cocker's Mad Dogs and Englishmen tour. McDonald sang on the Rolling Stones album Exile On Main St. and she worked with Delaney & Bonnie, Freddie King, and Big Brother and the Holding Company before she signed a solo deal with Capitol Records.

== Recording and release ==
McDonald recorded the album in 1973 with co-producers David Briggs and Pete Sears who also played keys, bass and was musical arranger for the record. The album, Insane Asylum, is titled after the Willie Dixon penned track by Koko Taylor, which McDonald sang as a duet with Sly Stone. Two singles were released from the album, "Freak Lover" and "Bogart to Bowie."

== Critical reception ==
Professional ratings
Review scores
Source	Rating
Allmusic	2/5 stars

Cash Box (March 2, 1974):

The pretty young lady whose voice so gorgeously backed the likes of Leon Russell and Joe Cocker explodes with beauty and power at the same time on her new Capitol LP. Reminiscent in a way of Janis Joplin in her prime, Kathi displays her talents both as a stylist and songwriter as she sings the Bee Gees "To Love Somebody", Holland-Dozier-Holland's "Heat Wave", and the Elvis Presley classic, "Heartbreak Hotel". The title track, written by Willie Dixon, is probably the strongest cut on the album and could be a potential single if given a good shot. The time is right for Kathi and this LP.

== Track listing ==
1. "Bogart to Bowie" (Kathi McDonald, Pete Sears) - 4:07
2. "To Love Somebody" (Barry Gibb, Robin Gibb) - 4:32
3. "(Love is Like a) Heat Wave" (Holland-Dozier-Holland) - 2:03
4. "Threw My Love Away" (Pete Sears) - 2:56
5. "Freak Lover" (Mark Unobski) - 3:36
6. "Down to the Wire" (Neil Young) - 2:53
7. "Heartbreak Hotel" (Elvis Presley, Mae Boren Axton, Tommy Durden) - 2:32
8. "If You Need Me" (Robert Bateman, Sonny Sanders, Wilson Pickett) - 2:52
9. "Somethin' Else" (Eddie Cochran, Sharon Sheeley) - 2:45
10. "All I Want to Be" (Peter Frampton) - 3:41
11. "Insane Asylum" (Willie Dixon) - 6:05

== Personnel ==
- Kathi McDonald - lead vocals
- Sly Stone - vocals on "Insane Asylum"
- Pointer Sisters - backing vocals
- Pete Sears - bass, keyboards, musical arrangements, guitar on "Insane Asylum", piano on "Freak Lover"
- Nils Lofgren - guitar on "Down to the Wire" and "Insane Asylum"
- John Cipollina - lead guitar on "Somethin' Else"
- Greg Douglass - rhythm guitar on "(Love is Like a) Heat Wave", "Heartbreak Hotel" and "If You Need Me"
- Ronnie Montrose - lead guitar on "(Love is Like a) Heat Wave", "Heartbreak Hotel" and "If You Need Me"
- Jim McPherson - bass on "Freak Lover"
- Papa John Creach - violin on "Freak Lover"
- Gary Philippet - rhythm guitar on "Somethin' Else"
- Neal Schon - guitar on "Threw My Love Away" and "All I Want to Be"
- Aynsley Dunbar - drums
- Bobbye Hall - percussion on "Bogart to Bowie", "(Love is Like a) Heat Wave" and "Down to the Wire"
- Tower of Power Horns - on "(Love is Like a) Heat Wave" and "If You Need Me"
- Boots Hughston - trumpet and saxophone on "Insane Asylum"

== Chart performance ==
Chart (1974)	Peak position
US Billboard Top LP's & Tapes	156
US Cash Box Top 100 Albums Cont'd	104
US Record World The Album Chart	140
