= David Briggs (music producer) =

American record producer (1944–1995)

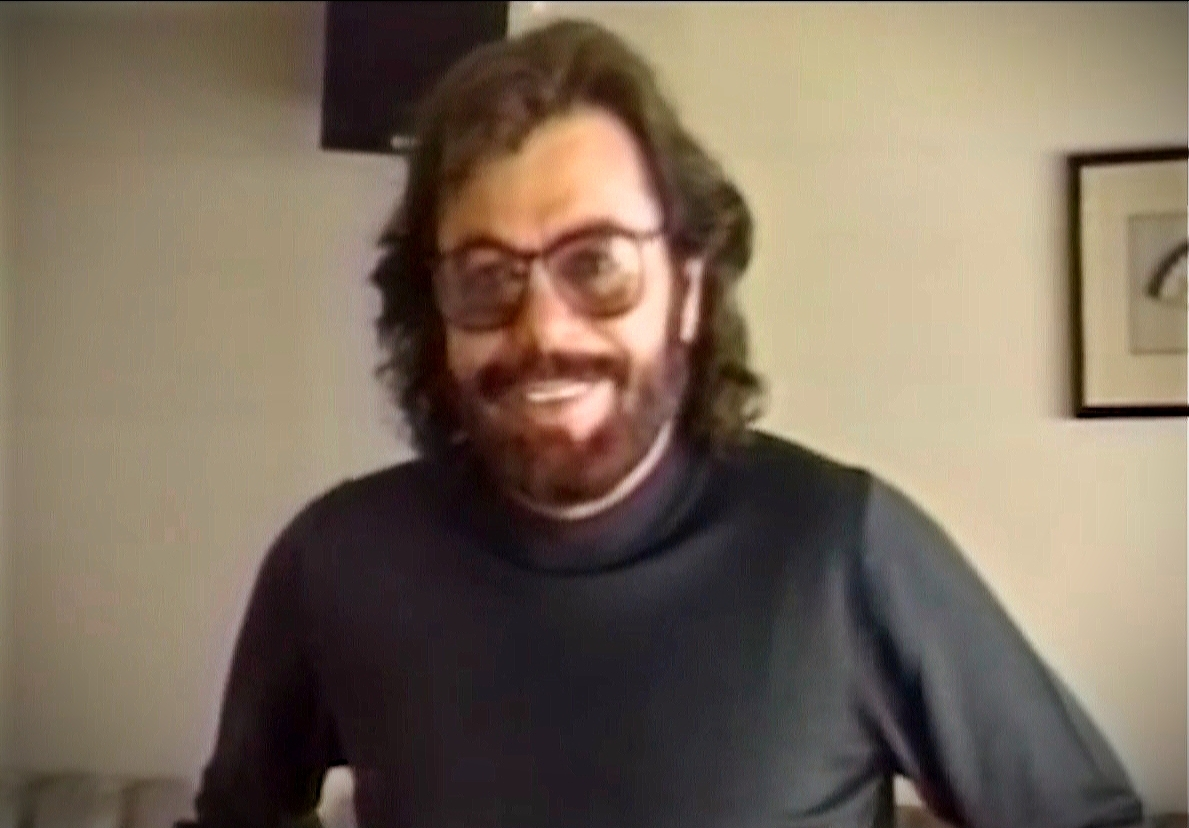
- Briggs in 1994

Background information
- Born: David Manning Briggs; February 29, 1944; Douglas, Wyoming, United States
- Died: November 26, 1995 (aged 51) San Francisco, California, U.S.
- Occupation: Record producer
- Years active: c.1965 – 1995

David Manning Briggs (February 29, 1944 – November 26, 1995) was an American record producer best known for his work with Neil Young and his band Crazy Horse.

== Early life and career ==
David Briggs was born in Douglas, Wyoming. He left Wyoming in 1962 to hitchhike his way to Los Angeles and Canada, then finally settled in California, the place he would call home for the rest of his life. In the mid-sixties, Briggs began producing in the music business working on Bill Cosby's label, Tetragrammaton Records. One of the first albums he produced was for comedian Murray Roman. According to Briggs, this was the first album ever released with the word "fuck" on it. Working on Cosby's label led Briggs into doing his own production work with artists such as Alice Cooper, Summerhill, Quatrain, Spirit, Nils Lofgren and his band Grin, and Jerry Lynn Williams.

In 1968, after picking up a hitchhiking Neil Young, Briggs went on to produce the singer-songwriter's first solo album, entitled Neil Young (1968). This led to a lifelong friendship between the two men, with Briggs co-producing over a dozen of Young's albums including Everybody Knows This Is Nowhere and After the Gold Rush. Young's Sleeps with Angels album (1994) is the last work that Briggs produced before his death in 1995. Other than producing with Young, Briggs worked on albums with many successful artists, including Willie Nelson, Tom Rush, Steve Young, Nick Cave and the Bad Seeds and Royal Trux.

A production and distribution deal was formed in 1970 between Columbia Records, Briggs and attorney Art Linson. Already an established producer, Briggs and Linson founded Spindizzy Records.

== Death and posthumous projects ==
Briggs died of lung cancer on November 26, 1995. He was 51 years old. Before his death, he was still working with Joel Bernstein on the Neil Young Archives project. This project had been underway for five years before his death and it was estimated at that time there could be anywhere from three to 20 albums worth of unreleased material. (Neil Young Archives Volumes 1 and 2 were released in 2009 and 2020 respectively.)

After Briggs's death, Neil Young and Crazy Horse went on to record material such as Broken Arrow, released in 1996 and Year of the Horse, released in 1997. They have recorded sporadically in the new millennium, releasing the studio albums Greendale (2003), Americana, Psychedelic Pill (both 2012), Barn (2021) and World Record (2022).

The band The Low & Sweet Orchestra was working with Briggs at the time of his death. Their album Goodbye To All That was released in 1996 and featured 9 out of 12 tracks produced by Briggs.

== Critical views ==
According to his New York Times obituary: "He developed a reputation as a passionate and opinionated producer, placing great demands on the musicians with whom he worked to get the rawest, most direct sound he could in the least amount of time."

Briggs's work was not universally acclaimed. Neal Smith of the Alice Cooper group later said "David hated our music and us. I recall the term that he used, referring to our music, was 'psychedelic shit'." I think Easy Action sounded too dry, more like a TV or radio commercial, and he did not help with song arrangement or positive input in any way." His sessions with Nick Cave for the album Henry's Dream also did not turn out the way the artist wanted, with Cave later saying "He was a fucking nightmare, that guy. I know he's dead now and all, but, fuck, man. I put a lot of energy into the writing of that record, and then for each day to see it drift away… it was a horrible, horrible experience."

== Personal life ==
Briggs had one son, Lincoln, with artist Shannon Forbes in 1969.

In 1988, Briggs married Bettina Linnenberg, who became the production coordinator on many of the projects that Briggs produced in the 1990s. These included recordings with Cave, Royal Trux, 13 Engines and Sidewinder. She also helped him on projects that remain unreleased, including work with John Eddie and Blind Melon.

Briggs was a spiritual atheist.

== Selective discography as producer or co-producer ==
=== Neil Young ===
- 1968 – Neil Young
- 1969 – Everybody Knows This Is Nowhere
- 1970 – After the Gold Rush
- 1974 – On the Beach
- 1975 – Tonight's the Night
- 1975 – Zuma
- 1977 – American Stars 'N Bars
- 1978 – Comes a Time
- 1979 – Rust Never Sleeps
- 1979 – Live Rust
- 1981 – Re-ac-tor
- 1982 – Trans
- 1985 – Old Ways
- 1987 – Life
- 1990 – Ragged Glory
- 1991 – Weld
- 1993 – Unplugged
- 1994 – Sleeps with Angels
- 2017 – Hitchhiker
- 2018 – Roxy: Tonight's the Night Live
- 2018 – Songs for Judy
- 2021 – Way Down in the Rust Bucket

=== Other Artists ===
- 1968 Murray Roman – You Can't beat People Up and Have Them Say "I Love You"
- 1968 Lost and Found – Lost and Found
- 1968 Quatrain – Quatrain
- 1969 Summerhill – Summerhill
- 1970 Alice Cooper – Easy Action
- 1970 Tom Rush – Wrong End of the Rainbow
- 1970 Spirit – Twelve Dreams of Dr. Sardonicus
- 1971 Nils Lofgren & Grin – Grin
- 1972 Nils Lofgren & Grin – 1+1
- 1972 Spirit – Feedback
- 1973 Kathi McDonald – Insane Asylum
- 1975 Nils Lofgren – Nils Lofgren
- 1976 Nils Lofgren – Cry Tough
- 1986 Bradley Ditto – Check Me Out
- 1991 13 Engines – A Blur to Me Now
- 1992 Nick Cave and the Bad Seeds – Henry's Dream
- 1995 Royal Trux – Thank You
- 1996 The Low & Sweet Orchestra – Goodbye to all that
