= Michael Curtis (musician) =

- Also known as: Mike Curtis
- Origin: Goshen, Indiana
- Genres: Rock music, folk music
- Occupation: Musician/Songwriter
- Instruments: Keyboards, piano, organ, guitar, mandolin
- Years active: 1960s to present
- Formerly of: These Vizitors, Truck, Crazy Horse, The Curtis Bros., Hoyt Axton band

Michael Curtis is a musician and composer. He was also a member of These Vizitors, The Curtis Brothers, Crazy Horse, Buffalo Springfield Again, the Byrds with Gene Clark, and later with Hoyt Axton. He also co-wrote the hit "Southern Cross" with Steve Stills, which was recorded by Crosby, Stills & Nash. It had originally been "Seven League Boots" written with brother Rick.

== Background ==
Michael Curtis was born in Goshen, Indiana. His family was a musical one. When they were in their teens, they formed the band These Vizitors. With the help of their father, who was a disc jockey at a local radio station, they traveled about playing at high schools and local functions. As they refined their talents, doors began to open for them till finally they landed a recording session with Capitol Records. Both singles, "Happy Man" and "For Mary's Sake", made the charts. In later years, Michael co-wrote, with brother Rick, "Seven League Boots" which Stephen Stills modified along with Michael. The song was released as "Southern Cross" in 1982 by Crosby, Stills, and Nash. "Blue Letter" was co-written by himself and brother Rick. It was later recorded by Fleetwood Mac.

== Career ==
Along with Rick Curtis, Tom Curtis, Patti Curtis and Travis Rose, he was a member of the Goshen, Indiana band, These Vizitors, He co-wrote a single for These Vizitors, "Happy Man" and "For Mary’s Sake" which was recorded in New York and released on Capitol P-2163 in May 1968. After relocating to Florida, they played at the Kandy Bar and local clubs in the West Palm Beach area. They played at the Miami Pop Festival in 1968. The Miami Pop Festival was produced by Michael Lang and was a precursor to Woodstock in 1969.

In 1972, he was a member of Crazy Horse and played on the album, At Crooked Lake, contributing vocals, piano, organ, guitar and mandolin and wrote most of the songs for the album,

During the 1970s, he and brother Rick were based at West Palm Beach then moved to Southern California and playing at venues in Southern California which included The Troubador.

In the late 1980s and early 1990s, he was the lead vocalist in a latter version of Buffalo Springfield put together by drummer Dewey Martin. as well as the Byrds with Gene Clark. He was also a member of Hoyt Axton's band in the early 1990s. During that period, Axton and his band played the first Farm Aid concert in Champaign, Illinois.

In the early 2000s he was a member of a The Byrds Celebration that was set to play at the Arts Festival Oklahoma, Oklahoma City Community College in early September 2000.
