= Crazy Horse (band) =

American rock band

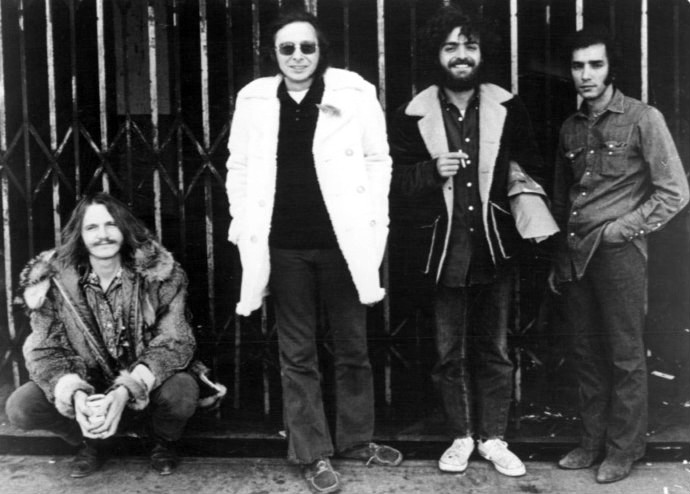
- Crazy Horse in 1972 (From left to right: Danny Whitten, Jack Nitzsche, Billy Talbot, Ralph Molina)

Background information
- Also known as: Danny & the Memories; the Rockets; the Psyrcle; Neil Young & Crazy Horse
- Origin: Los Angeles, California
- Genres: Garage rock; folk rock; country rock; hard rock; psychedelic rock
- Years active: 1969–present
- Labels: Reprise; Epic; Rhino
- Members: Neil Young; Ralph Molina; Billy Talbot; Micah Nelson
- Past members: Danny Whitten; Frank "Poncho" Sampedro; Nils Lofgren; Jack Nitzsche; George Whitsell; Greg LeRoy; John Blanton; Rick Curtis; Michael Curtis; Sonny Mone; Matt Piucci

Crazy Horse is an American rock band best known for their association with the musician Neil Young. Since 1969, fifteen studio albums and eight live albums have been billed as being by Neil Young and Crazy Horse. They have also released six studio albums of their own between 1971 and 2009.

Billy Talbot (bass) and Ralph Molina (drums) have been the only consistent members of the band across its fifty-seven years. Founding guitarist Danny Whitten died in 1972 after recording two studio albums, Everybody Knows This Is Nowhere (with Young) and Crazy Horse. Except for two notable intervals, Frank "Poncho" Sampedro (rhythm guitar) regularly performed with the group from 1975 until 2014. On four of Crazy Horse's stand-alone studio albums, Talbot and Molina serve as the rhythm section to different sets of musicians.

Following Sampedro's retirement, Nils Lofgren, a member of Crazy Horse between 1970 and 1971, rejoined the group. The quartet of Young, Talbot, Molina and Lofgren recorded three studio albums between 2019 and 2022. In 2024, guitarist Micah Nelson, who had previously played with Young in Promise of the Real, replaced Lofgren.

== History ==
=== Early years ===
The band's origins date to 1963 and the Los Angeles-based a cappella doo-wop group Danny & the Memories, which consisted of lead singer Danny Whitten and supporting vocalists Lou Bisbal (soon to be replaced by Benjamin Rocco, the husband of actress Lorna Maitland), Billy Talbot, and Ralph Molina.

Sly Stone produced a single for the group (by then re-christened the Psyrcle) in San Francisco on Lorna Records (a subsidiary of Autumn Records); however, it did not sell very well either regionally or nationally.

Back in Los Angeles, the group evolved over the course of several years into the Rockets, a psychedelic pop/folk rock ensemble that juxtaposed the rudimentary instrumental abilities of Whitten (rhythm guitar), Talbot (bass) and Molina (drums) against the more accomplished Bobby Notkoff (violin) and Leon Whitsell (lead guitar). After leaving the group as sessions for their first album commenced, the mercurial and reclusive Whitsell was promptly replaced by his younger brother George, a R&B-influenced guitarist also respected in the band's social circle. After Leon petitioned to return, it was decided that both Whitsells would remain in the group.

This sextet recorded the Rockets' only album, a self-titled record released in 1968 on White Whale Records. Whitten and Leon Whitsell contributed four songs apiece, with one song credited to Talbot and Molina and another, "Pill's Blues", to George Whitsell. Whitten's "Let Me Go" was prominently covered by Three Dog Night on their 1968 debut album; during this period, vocalist Danny Hutton considered recruiting Whitten for that band.

Although their album sold only about 5,000 copies, the Rockets soon re-connected with Neil Young, whom they had met two years earlier during the early days of Buffalo Springfield. In August 1968, three months after Buffalo Springfield dissolved, Young played with the group during a Rockets performance at the Whisky a Go Go; Molina would later recall that Young's idiosyncratically distinctive guitar style "blew George Whitsell's away. He was kind of overshadowed."

=== With Neil Young, 1968–1970 ===
Shortly after the club collaboration, Young enlisted Whitten, Talbot, and Molina to back him on his second solo album. Although all parties initially envisaged the Rockets continuing as a separate project, the older band soon folded due to Young's insistence on having his new backing trio keep to a strict practice schedule. According to George Whitsell, "My understanding was Neil was gonna use the guys for a record and a quick tour, bring 'em back and help us produce the next Rockets album. It took me a year and a half to realize that my band had been taken."

Credited to Neil Young with Crazy Horse, Everybody Knows This Is Nowhere was released in May 1969. During a 98-week chart stay, it peaked at No. 34 on the Billboard 200 in August 1970 after Young had come to greater prominence as a member of Crosby, Stills, Nash & Young. It included the U.S. No. 55 pop hit "Cinnamon Girl"; the extended, jam-driven "Down by the River" and "Cowgirl in the Sand"; and a panoply of country and folk-influenced songs exemplified by the spare title track and "Running Dry (Requiem for the Rockets)," a florid tribute to the defunct band that featured a guest appearance by Notkoff.

Crazy Horse toured clubs and theaters with Young throughout the first half of 1969 and, following the October 1969 addition of frequent Young collaborator Jack Nitzsche on electric piano, in early 1970. The latter tour was showcased on the 2006 album Live at the Fillmore East. Young would later say that "[on] some of the stuff, Nitzsche was in the way, tonally... Crazy Horse was so good with the two guitars, bass and drums it didn't need anything else." Although Nitzsche openly disdained the rhythm section of Talbot and Molina, he retrospectively lauded Whitten (who was of Scotch-Irish American ancestry) as "the only Black man in the band."

While Young worked on his second album with Crazy Horse (including takes of Whitten's "Look at All the Things", Whitten & Young's "Come On Baby Let's Go Downtown" and Young's "Helpless" and "Winterlong") throughout the summer and autumn of 1969, Young joined Crosby, Stills & Nash as a full fourth member contemporaneously, recording an album and touring with the ensemble in 1969 and 1970. When Young returned to his solo album in 1970, Crazy Horse found its participation more limited. The group as a whole appears on just three of the eleven tracks on After the Gold Rush, which was credited solely to Young upon its September 1970 release: "When You Dance I Can Really Love", "I Believe in You", and a cover of Don Gibson's "Oh Lonesome Me" from the 1969 sessions. Even though Talbot's appearances on the album were confined to the Crazy Horse tracks, Molina was the project's main drummer (often performing in an ad hoc backing ensemble with emergent singer-songwriter/multi-instrumentalist Nils Lofgren and CSNY bassist Greg Reeves on the non-Crazy Horse tracks), while Whitten continued to contribute backing vocals and guitar to several songs (including "Southern Man" and "Only Love Can Break Your Heart", a U.S. No. 33 hit) despite his escalating heroin abuse.

Young "fired" the group in the aftermath of the 1970 tour due to Whitten's addiction (partially attributable to his severe rheumatoid arthritis, for which he had previously received a medical discharge from the United States Navy) following an incapacitated performance during the Fillmore East engagement. According to Molina, Whitten also felt that Young was "holdin' him back" as a guitarist and songwriter. Decades later, the extant recordings from the 1969 sessions (most notably a heretofore unknown iteration of "Helpless", long presumed lost due to an engineering error) were combined with select alternate mixes from Everybody Knows This Is Nowhere on Early Daze (2024).

=== With and without Young, late 1970–1989 ===
If I played Crazy Horse tours every tour, I'd be dead. There's no way I'd be here. I can remember playing with that band where I'm almost blacking out, hyperventilating. There's something very free about playing with that band, but I couldn't stay there. I wouldn't be here if I stayed there all the time.

— Neil Young, comment made at the 2006 South by Southwest Music + Media Conference

Despite Young's dismissal, Crazy Horse capitalized on its newfound exposure and recorded its eponymous debut album for Reprise Records that year. The band retained Nitzsche (who co-produced the album with Bruce Botnick) and added Lofgren as a second guitarist; singer-songwriter and guitarist Ry Cooder also sat in on three tracks at the behest of Nitzsche to substitute for the ailing Whitten. Although the album peaked at only No. 84 on the Billboard 200 chart in 1971, Whitten's "I Don't Want to Talk About It" would later be covered by a wide range of artists, including Geoff Muldaur, the Indigo Girls, Pegi Young, and Rod Stewart.

Following the commercial failure of Crazy Horse, Lofgren and Nitzsche left the group to resume their solo careers; meanwhile, Whitten's drug problems pushed Talbot and Molina to dismiss him and turn to outside musicians. The band released two albums (Loose and At Crooked Lake) on different labels to critical and commercial failure in 1972; along with Talbot and Molina, guitarist/singer-songwriter Greg Leroy was the only musician to appear on both albums. While the former saw Rockets guitarist George Whitsell briefly return to the fold, fronting the band in conjunction with Leroy and keyboardist John Blanton, the latter was dominated by the polished country rock of Rick and Mike Curtis, formerly of These Vizitors and best known for their later work as the Curtis Brothers.

In the fall of 1972, Young placed Whitten on retainer with a view toward including the guitarist in his new touring band, the Stray Gators. However, following his poor performance in rehearsals at Dress Review Sound Studio in Hollywood, the band pressured Young to dismiss him. Although Young let Whitten live on his ranch near Woodside, California and worked with him one-on-one during off-hours in an unsuccessful effort to keep him in the group, Young fired him and Whitten died several hours later after returning to Los Angeles, his death attributed to a fatal overdose of alcohol and Valium.

After Whitten's death and the tepid reception of their most recent albums, Talbot and Molina were left as the only members of the band. They let the Crazy Horse name go unused while resolving not to retire it altogether. In mid-1973, Young brought together a band comprising Talbot, Molina, Lofgren, and pedal steel guitarist Ben Keith to record a new album, the majority of which became the basis of 1975's Tonight's the Night. In the autumn of 1973, that ensemble (initially billed as Crazy Horse for the inaugural concerts at the Roxy in September 1973) toured Canada, the United Kingdom, and the United States as the Santa Monica Flyers. Molina and Whitsell would subsequently contribute to Young's On the Beach in 1974.

Shortly after aborted Young sessions involving Talbot, Molina and Keith at Chicago's Chess Studios in late 1974, the band spontaneously reconvened without Keith at Talbot's Echo Park home in 1975. These jam sessions cemented the role of rhythm guitarist Frank "Poncho" Sampedro, a friend of Talbot who began to play with the group during the Chicago sessions and would go on to be a long-time member of Crazy Horse. "It was great," Talbot would say of the gathering and the chemistry it evoked. "We were all soaring. Neil loved it. We all loved it. It was the first time we heard the Horse since Danny Whitten died."

After the five-year hiatus since 1970, Young, Crazy Horse, and producer David Briggs, quickly recorded Zuma in the summer of 1975, in the basement of Briggs' rented house in Malibu. Sampedro's lack of technical proficiency at the time ("Neil kept writin' simpler songs so I could play them") and desire to see Young "rockin' and having fun" would greatly inform the sound of the record.

Following a warmup tour of unannounced appearances at various San Francisco Bay Area bars (dubbed by the media as the Rolling Zuma Revue in contrast to Bob Dylan's contemporaneous Rolling Thunder Revue) in December 1975, Young and the band toured Japan and Europe from March to April 1976. However, they were shut out of a proposed leg of touring when Young re-kindled his collaboration with Stephen Stills. Crazy Horse toured America that autumn when Young was forced to make up a series of canceled concert dates after leaving the Stills-Young tour before it was finished.

Following sessions in November 1975 for an aborted Crazy Horse album, the band went on to appear on both 1977's American Stars 'n Bars (including several discrete tracks and the entire first side, which was credited to an expanded lineup [Neil Young, Crazy Horse and the Bullets] with Ben Keith, violinist Carole Mayedo and backing vocalists Linda Ronstadt and Nicolette Larson) and on two tracks ("Look Out for My Love" and "Lotta Love") on 1978's Comes a Time.

In 1978, Crazy Horse released Crazy Moon, their fourth original album. It features instrumental contributions from Young, Bobby Notkoff, Greg Leroy, and Michael Curtis. Before the album's release, the band joined Young on the autumn 1978 arena tour that served as both the basis of the live/studio album Rust Never Sleeps and the tour document Live Rust, both released in 1979 and credited to Neil Young & Crazy Horse.

As Young spent much of the eighties pursuing his most experimental work to date, Crazy Horse recorded with him more sporadically after the critically disparaged 1981 album Re·ac·tor. The band began to record Trans (1982) before Young designated the project as a solo album, and a 1984 album was abandoned after their performances were dubbed by Young and Briggs as subpar. Following sporadic performances in 1984 and 1985, Neil Young & Crazy Horse toured in 1986 and recorded the album Life (1987).

Immediately thereafter, Young included all three members of Crazy Horse in a horn-augmented ensemble, the Bluenotes, and toured clubs in the fall of 1987. But when Talbot and Molina proved ill-suited to a blues-oriented approach, Young replaced them while retaining Sampedro, who would remain with Young in various band permutations over the next two years. During this period, Talbot and Molina hired former Rain Parade lead guitarist Matt Piucci and recruited Sonny Mone from Hanover, Massachusetts to provide lead vocals and rhythm guitar. With seven songs by Mone, this incarnation of the band recorded the pointedly-titled Left for Dead, released in 1989.

=== Neil Young & Crazy Horse: 1990–2014 ===
The split with Sampedro and Young proved relatively short-lived, as the duo reunited with Talbot and Molina under the name Crazy Horse in 1990 for the acclaimed album Ragged Glory and for a tour in 1991 that generated the live album Weld and the sound collage Arc. Over the next 12 years, Crazy Horse would steadily collaborate with Young, joining him for Sleeps with Angels (1994), Broken Arrow (1996), the live album Year of the Horse (1997), the long-shelved Toast (recorded in 2001 and ultimately released in 2022) and Greendale (2003). Sampedro, who was instructed to sit out the recording of Greendale (as Young felt the material called for only one guitar) considered leaving the band; eventually, he participated on guitar and organ for the ensuing tour of 2003-2004.

According to Jimmy McDonough, Crazy Horse had begun a sixth album of its own in the mid-1990s, but left the project unfinished when Young called upon the group to join him for some secret club dates in California (for which the quartet billed themselves as the Echoes), leading to the recording of Broken Arrow.

Crazy Horse remained on hiatus for seven years following the Greendale tour. Although Sampedro was employed as a full-time assistant to Kevin Eubanks on The Tonight Show with Jay Leno from 1992 to 2010, the band continued to rehearse several times a year and more intermittently with Young during this period. Trick Horse—based on previously unreleased Crazy Horse recordings, possibly derived from older Sampedro-funded sessions where session musicians were hired to play the instrumental parts—was released on iTunes in 2009. According to Young in a 2011 interview with American Songwriter, "They have to be together before I can be together with them. They haven't been doing anything together, so they need to be able to do it. I don't have the time to support things. I have to go with things that are going to support me. But I think they can do it."

Shortly thereafter, Young and Crazy Horse convened to record two new albums, both of which were released in 2012. Americana was composed entirely of covers, mostly of American folk music revival standards, while Psychedelic Pill featured original songs written by Young for the band. Young and Crazy Horse embarked on the Alchemy Tour throughout 2012 and 2013 in support of both albums, traveling to the United States, Canada, Australia, New Zealand, and Europe.

In 2013, Talbot, Molina, George Whitsell, and lead vocalist/guitarist Ryan James Holzer formed Wolves. They released their first recording, Wolves EP, on February 16, 2014.

With the addition of background singers Dorene Carter and YaDonna West, Young and Crazy Horse toured Europe in the summer of 2014 to make-up cancelled dates from the Alchemy Tour, relating to an injury suffered by Sampedro. For the tour, longtime Young collaborator Rick Rosas stood in for Talbot, who was recovering from a minor stroke. Rosas died from pulmonary hypertension with cardiac arrest on November 8, less than three months after the tour concluded.

=== Poncho's departure, Lofgren's return and renewed activity: 2018–present ===
In May 2018, Lofgren joined Young, Talbot, and Molina for a series of five minimally advertised "open rehearsal" concerts in Fresno, California and Bakersfield, California, with the marquee reading "NYCH" (the band described by Young as the "Horse of a Different Color"). According to Young, "Life is an unfolding saga [...] Poncho is unable to join us right now but we all hope he will be back." In 2021, Sampedro confirmed that he had retired from music due to complications from arthritis in both wrists and a 2013 finger injury: "It became painful for me to be on the road. When we were on that last tour [in 2014], I was rolling down the road with both of my hands in ice buckets and one foot in an ice bucket, every night. That's really not that much fun. Then I got my finger slammed in the door [on the 2013 European tour]. There were too many signs saying it was over for me. It wasn't for any other reason. [...] I was messing things up on the last tour during the early songs in the set."

In February 2019, the Lofgren-era line-up performed two shows in Winnipeg. Its first album, Colorado, was released in October 2019, leading to the most prolific period of recording in the band's history. A second album, Barn, was recorded entirely in Young's barn in Colorado and released on December 10, 2021. In 2022, the band released the shelved album Toast (retaining Sampedro's guitar parts) and later the same year they released a third album with Lofgren in the lineup, World Record. In 2023, the members of Crazy Horse released All Roads Lead Home, a compilation comprising primarily solo recordings made during the COVID-19 pandemic. Young contributed a live version of a Crazy Horse song, and the collection was released under the collective name of Molina, Talbot, Lofgren & Young.

In September 2023, the band performed two shows celebrating the 50th anniversary of The Roxy, with Promise of the Real guitarist Micah Nelson filling in for Lofgren. Fuckin' Up, a live recording of a private November 4, 2023 performance of Ragged Glory at Toronto's The Rivoli, was released on April 26, 2024; credited to "Neil & the Horse," it features a line-up of Young, Talbot, Molina, Lofgren and Nelson.

In April 2024, Neil Young and Crazy Horse launched the acclaimed North America-based Love Earth Tour under the aegis of Young, Talbot, Molina and Nelson. On June 26, the remaining dates of the tour were cancelled due to unspecified illnesses in the band.

== Re-issued recordings ==
The self-titled debut album was re-issued on CD in 1994. In 2005, Rhino Records' Handmade division released the two-disc set, Scratchy: The Complete Reprise Recordings, in a limited edition of 2,500 copies. It included re-mastered versions of the debut album and their second, Loose in their entirety on the first disc, with the second disc containing nine rarities and out-takes (including both sides of a 1962 single by Danny and the Memories). The original set is currently out of print, but was re-issued on Rhino in England and Wounded Bird in the United States. Loose was also re-issued as a stand-alone CD by Wounded Bird in 2006. The Australian re-issue specialty label Raven Records put out Crazy Moon in 1999 with seven rare bonus tracks, as well as a 20-track retrospective in 2005, Gone Dead Train: The Best of Crazy Horse 1971–1989, featuring material from each of the group's five albums, with the exception of its second one, Loose. Left for Dead was released in 1995 on the Sisapa/Curb label, and Crazy Moon was re-issued on CD again as a BMG import in 2005. At Crooked Lake was re-issued in 2013 on the Floating World label.

== Members ==
=== Current ===
- Billy Talbot – bass, backing and lead vocals, occasional keyboards (1968–present)
- Ralph Molina – drums, backing and lead vocals (1968–present)
- Micah Nelson – guitar, keyboards, backing vocals (2023–present)

=== Neil Young & Crazy Horse past members ===
- Danny Whitten – guitar, lead and backing vocals (1968–1971; died 1972)
- Nils Lofgren – guitar, keyboards, backing and lead vocals (1970–1971; 1973; 2018–2023)
- Rick Rosas – bass (substitute for Talbot in 2014; died 2014)
- Jack Nitzsche – keyboards, backing and lead vocals (1970–1971; died 2000)
- Frank "Poncho" Sampedro – rhythm guitar, keyboards, mandolin, backing and lead vocals (1975–1988; 1990–2001; 2003–2014)

=== Other past members ===
- George Whitsell – guitar, lead and backing vocals (1971–1972)
- Greg Leroy – guitar, lead and backing vocals (1971–1972; guest 1978)
- John Blanton – keyboards, harmonica, cello, backing and lead vocals (1971–1972)
- Rick Curtis – banjo, guitar, lead and backing vocals (1972)
- Michael Curtis – keyboards, guitar, mandolin, lead and backing vocals (1972; guest 1978)
- Sonny Mone – lead vocals, rhythm guitar (1989)
- Matt Piucci – lead guitar, backing vocals (1989)

=== Neil Young tenures ===
- Neil Young – lead vocals, lead guitar, keyboards, harmonica (1969–1970; 1973–1976; 1978–1987; 1990–present)

== Discography ==
=== Crazy Horse ===
Studio albums (without Neil Young)

- Crazy Horse (1971)
- Loose (1972)
- At Crooked Lake (1972)
- Crazy Moon (1978)
- Left for Dead (1989)
- Trick Horse (2009)

Compilations

- Gone Dead Train: The Best of Crazy Horse 1971–1989 (2005)
- Scratchy: The Complete Reprise Recordings (2005)

=== Neil Young and Crazy Horse ===
==== Studio albums ====
- Everybody Knows This Is Nowhere (1969)
- Zuma (1975)
- American Stars 'n Bars (1977)
- Rust Never Sleeps (1979)
- Re·ac·tor (1981)
- Life (1987)
- Ragged Glory (1990)
- Sleeps with Angels (1994)
- Broken Arrow (1996)
- Greendale (2003)
- Americana (2012)
- Psychedelic Pill (2012)
- Colorado (2019)
- Barn (2021)
- Toast (2022; recorded 2001)
- World Record (2022)
- Early Daze (2024; recorded 1969)

==== Live albums ====
- Live Rust (1979)
- Weld (1991)
- Arc (1991) - a 35-minute composite of feedback, guitar noise, and vocal fragments culled from endings of songs performed live
- Year of the Horse (1997)
- Live at the Fillmore East (2006; recorded March 6–7, 1970)
- Return to Greendale (live, 2020; recorded September 4, 2003)
- Way Down in the Rust Bucket (2021; recorded November 13, 1990)
- Fuckin' Up (2024; recorded November 4, 2023 with Lofgren and Nelson)

==== Films and videos ====
- Rust Never Sleeps (1979)
- Weld (1991)
- The Complex Sessions (1995)
- Year of the Horse (1997)
- Greendale (2004)
  - video release includes "Be the Rain" live at the Air Canada Centre, Toronto, Ontario, 9/4/03

Other appearances

- Farm Aid 2003: A Soundstage Special Event (c. 2004)
  - includes "Hey Hey, My My (Into the Black)" live at the Germain Amphitheater, Columbus, Ohio, 9/7/03
- A MusiCares Tribute to Bruce Springsteen (2014)

=== Session work ===
Neil Young

- After the Gold Rush (1970) - "Oh Lonesome Me", "When You Dance I Can Really Love" and "I Believe in You"
- Tonight's the Night (1975) - most tracks featuring Lofgren, Molina, and Talbot as part of the Santa Monica Flyers; "Come on Baby Let's Go Downtown" (recorded live at the Fillmore East on March 7, 1970)
- American Stars 'n Bars (1977) - all songs except "Star of Bethlehem" and "Will to Love"
- Comes a Time (1978) - "Look Out for My Love" and "Lotta Love"
- Trans (1982) - "We R in Control" and "Computer Cowboy (aka Syscrusher)"
- Are You Passionate? (2002) - "Goin' Home"

Other artists

- She Used to Wanna Be a Ballerina, Buffy Sainte-Marie, Vanguard, 1971
- Head like a Rock, Ian McNabb, 1994 (on four songs only; without Sampedro)

=== Related albums ===
The Rockets

- The Rockets (White Whale Records; 1968)

Billy Talbot

- Alive in the Spirit World (2004)
- On the Road to Spearfish (2013)

Ralph Molina

- Love & Inspiration (2019)
- All Roads Lead Home (as Molina, Talbot, Lofgren & Young; 2023)
