= Rockline =

- Genre: Call-in interview, active rock, classic rock
- Running time: 90 minutes (including commercials)
- Country of origin: United States
- Language: English
- Home station: KLOS (Los Angeles)
- Syndicates: Global Satellite Network (1981–1998); AMFM (1998–2000); Premiere Radio Networks (2000–2002); Crystal Media Networks (2003–2008); Dial Global (2008–2014)
- Hosted by: Bob Coburn; See also § Hosts
- Recording studio: L.A. Studios; Los Angeles, California
- Original release: May 4, 1981 – December 22, 2014
- No. of episodes: ≈1,650
- Audio format: Stereophonic sound

Rockline was a nationally syndicated radio interview program hosted by Bob Coburn that was broadcast live via satellite every Monday and Wednesday night from 8:30pm-10pm PT to radio stations in the United States and Canada. Founded in 1981, it was considered to be the longest running, uninterrupted program in rock history. The main guests interviewed on the program were various musical artists of the rock genre, including both active rock artists (on Mondays) and classic rock artists (on Wednesdays). The primary feature of the program was the ability for listeners to call live and ask questions to the guests. Several of the shows were also live performances.

== History ==
=== Owners, syndicators, and show format ===
Rockline started in 1981 with a weekly format on Monday nights, Monday being chosen because at the time most bands did not play on Mondays. The first guests on the show were Joe Walsh of the Eagles and Tom Johnston of The Doobie Brothers, on May 4, 1981. The show generally originated in Los Angeles, occasionally from the ABC Studios in New York City.

In the early 1990s, a TV show called Rockline on MTV was spun off the radio show. It kept the same live, call-in format.

In June 1998, AMFM Radio Networks purchased Rockline, among other programs, from the Global Satellite Network. Under the ownership of AMFM, the show expanded to two nights a week, Mondays and Wednesdays, on January 1, 1999. In August 2000, AMFM was merged into Premiere Radio Networks, a wholly owned subsidiary of Clear Channel Communications. Two years later, in November 2002, Premiere announced that 15 programs were being cut from their roster, including Rockline. Shortly thereafter, in January 2003, host Bob Coburn purchased the show from Premiere. Later that same year, in November, Crystal Media Networks began syndicating the show. November 2008 saw a change in syndicator when Dial Global picked up Rockline, while Bob Coburn continued to be the host.

On November 20, 2014, Coburn announced that Rockline would have its final broadcast on December 22, 2014. In a statement released by syndicator, Westwood One, Coburn noted that "the world has changed from an innovative, unique idea back in 1981 to one of near constant exposure for artists in 2014. With the Internet, Twitter accounts, hundreds of television channels and a more sophisticated press, artists are now literally at the fingertips of their fans. 'Rockline' is no longer the invaluable tool to connect fans with their Rock & Roll heroes, it has become but one of many…Now is the time to pass the mantle."

=== Hosts ===
The original host for six months was B. Mitchel Reed. Following that, Coburn was the lone host until the early 1990s. Following his departure, there were three full-time hosts, Steve Downes, Beau Rials and Riki Rachtman, until March 10, 1997, when Coburn returned. Coburn died of lung cancer on December 17, 2016, at age 68.

== Guests ==
Two major "hold-out" guests who never appeared on the show were Bruce Springsteen and Eric Clapton. Axl Rose and Slash made their last interview together, in 1994, on Rockline. The two guests who appeared the most are Ozzy Osbourne (19 times) and Rush (18 times).

Notable non-musical guests include then Governor of Arkansas Bill Clinton with running mate, then-United States Senator from Tennessee Al Gore during their presidential campaign in 1992; and on December 16, 1993, radio superstar Howard Stern, the latter of whom was promoting his New Year's Eve pay-per-view special.

== Other entities ==
There was also a Rockline that began in 1982 by a group of radio and record company executives, one of whom being a co-founder of MTV. This 2nd Rockline was the very first electronic bulletin board (now called website) in the Rock genre, and it offered rock musician interviews, band news, album reviews, concert information and ticket prices, major record label releases for the week, artist discographies, film reviews, TV show reviews, musician job referrals and MTV and FM radio station playlists. Rockline was the first rock show online, on the internet, and ultimately, it was transmitted to the national public via CompuServe. The terminal program was PC-Talk III.
