= Ralph Molina =

American musician (born 1943)

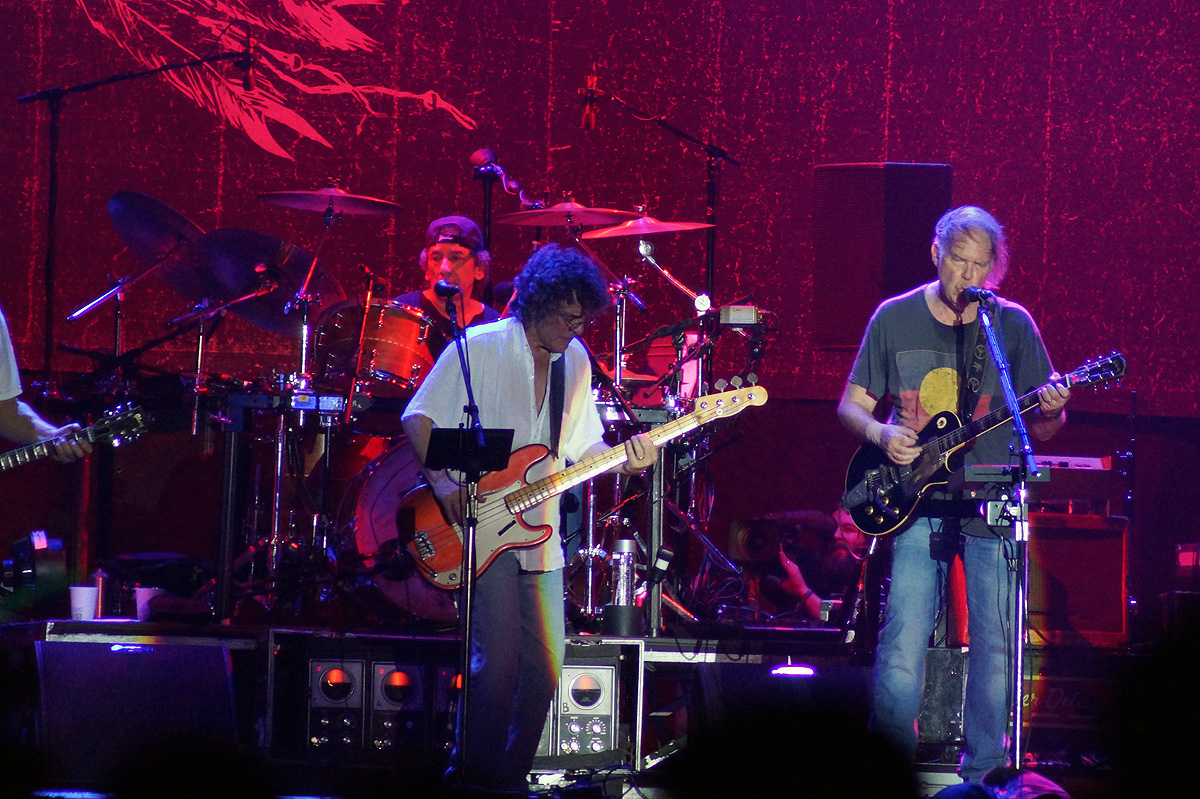
- Ralph Molina (drums), Billy Talbot (bass), Neil Young (guitar) in 2012

Background information
- Born: June 22, 1943 (age 81); Puerto Rico
- Genres: Rock
- Occupation: Musician
- Instruments: Drums; vocals
- Years active: 1962–present
- Member of: Crazy Horse

Ralph Molina (born June 22, 1943) is a Puerto Rico-born American musician, best known as the drummer for Neil Young's backing band Crazy Horse.

Born in Puerto Rico, Molina has been a member of Crazy Horse since they were formed in 1962 as Danny & the Memories. He has remained throughout the band's many personnel changes, and has performed on all releases by the band, with and without Young. Molina's style of drumming is characterized by simple but steady beats and fills.

Molina's musical beginnings were in local doo-wop groups, singing harmonies with friends in New York, and then in Florida, where he graduated from high school. He later moved to California to sing with his cousin Lou's group, which led to other musical opportunities. Molina joined Danny Whitten, Billy Talbot, and Ben Rocco in the doo-wop group Danny and the Memories, which in the 60s morphed into a folk-rock act called The Psyrcle, later known as The Rockets.

As the decade came to a close, the group renamed themselves Crazy Horse after playing with Neil Young. Although the band lineup has changed over the years, Molina and Talbot have remained as core members of Crazy Horse, recording over 30 albums. Molina released his first solo album, Love & Inspiration in March 2019.
