= Billy Talbot =

American singer-songwriter and musician (born 1943)

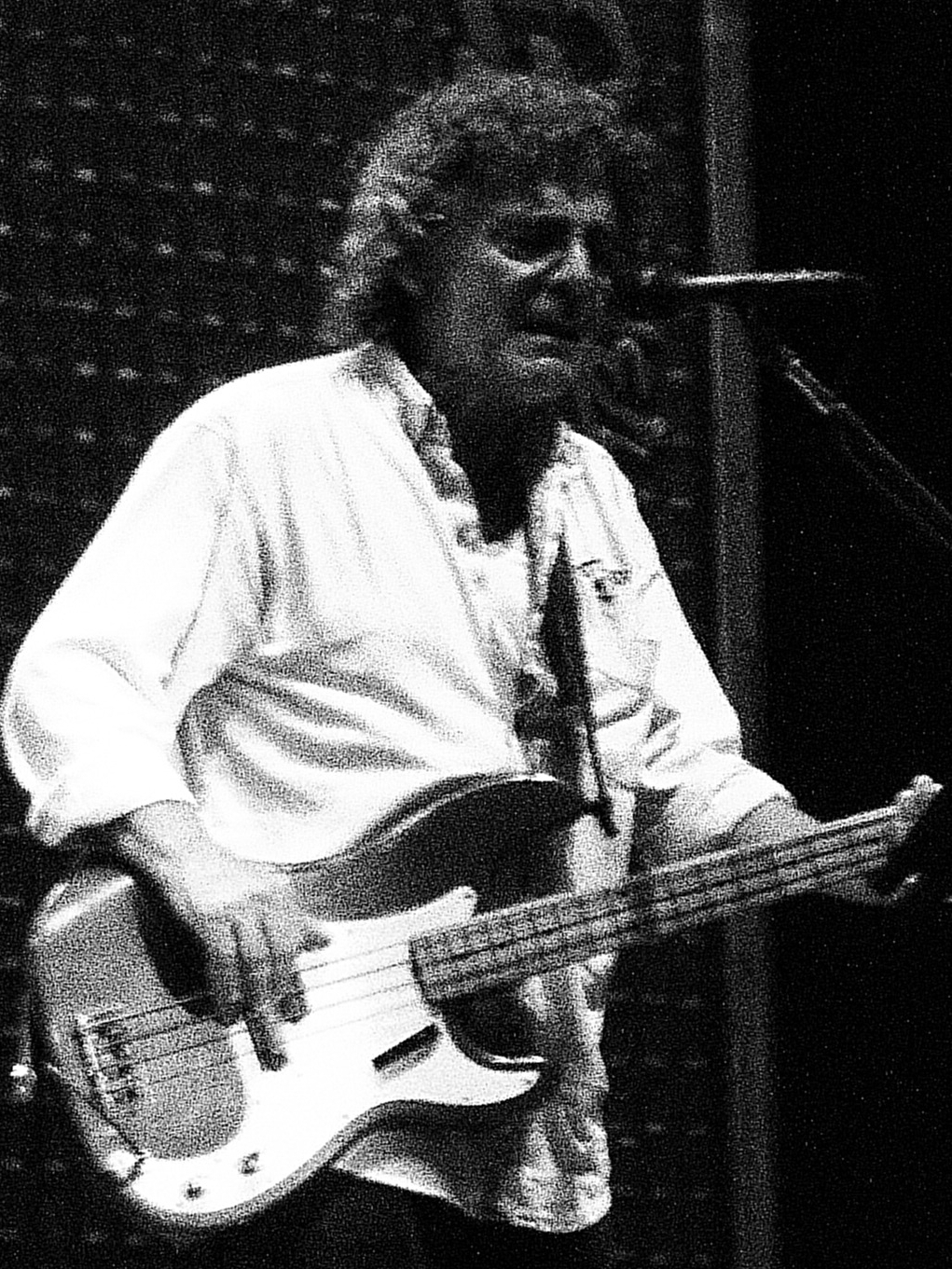
- Talbot performing with Neil Young and Crazy Horse in 2012

Background information
- Born: William Hammond Talbot; October 23, 1943 (age 82); New York City, U.S.
- Occupations: Singer-songwriter; musician
- Instruments: Bass; vocals
- Member of: Crazy Horse
- Website: www.billytalbotband.com

William Hammond Talbot (born October 23, 1943) is an American singer-songwriter and musician, best known as the bassist of Crazy Horse.

== Music career ==
Born in New York City, Talbot started his musical career singing on street corners at the age of 14. He moved to New Jersey with his family the next year, and by 17 he had moved to Los Angeles. There, he befriended fellow expatriate New Yorkers Ralph Molina, Danny Whitten and Benjamin Rocco. Together they formed a doo-wop group called Danny and the Memories. After moving the group to San Francisco, they morphed into The Psyrcle, which eventually grew to encompass Leon and George Whitsell along with Bobby Notkoff. At this point, Talbot and his bandmates renamed the group The Rockets.

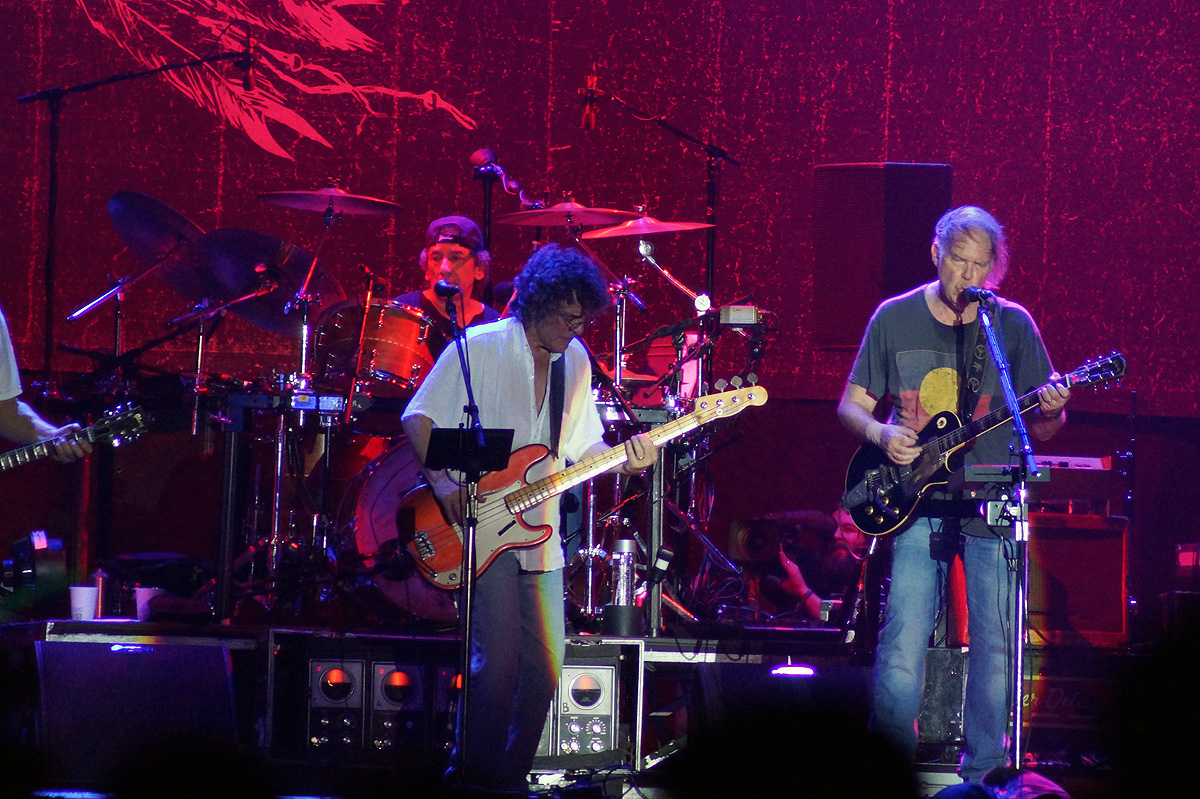
Ralph Molina (drums), Billy Talbot (bass), Neil Young (guitar) in with Crazy Horse in 2012

In 1967, the group met Neil Young, who at the time was a member of Buffalo Springfield. This meeting saw Molina, Whitten, and Talbot join forces with Young to create Crazy Horse.

Talbot began performing solo in 1999 at small venues. In October 2004, Talbot struck out on his own with The Billy Talbot Band, releasing the album Alive in the Spirit World on Sanctuary Records. In 2013, the band released their second album On the Road to Spearfish on Vapor Records.

In 2013 Talbot joined forces with Ralph Molina, George Whitsell and Ryan James Holzer to form the band Wolves. They released their first album Wolves EP on February 16, 2014. In June 2014, Talbot suffered a minor stroke and was forced to sit out Crazy Horse's imminent European tour. He has since recovered and rejoined the band.

== Discography ==
=== The Billy Talbot Band ===
Albums

- Alive in the Spirit World (2004)
- On the Road to Spearfish (2013)

Contributions

- "Rain", "Cherish", and "The Hunter" (2023) for All Roads Lead Home

=== with Wolves ===
EP

- Wolves (2014)
