= Neil Young Archives Volume III: 1976–1987 =

Box set by Neil Young
- Released: September 6, 2024
- Recorded: 1976–1987
- Genre: Rock
- Length: 841:37
- Label: Reprise
- Producers: Neil Young; David Briggs; Richard Kaplan; Tim Mulligan; Joel Bernstein; Cameron Crowe; Robbie Robertson; Jonathan Taplin; Bill Graham; Niko Bolas; Nicolette Larson; Jeff Blackburn; Ben Keith; Jerry Napier; Elliot Mazer; Danny Kortchmar

Neil Young chronology
Early Daze (2024)	Neil Young Archives Volume III: 1976–1987 (2024)	Oceanside Countryside (2025)

Singles from Neil Young Archives Volume III: 1976–1987
- 1. "Bright Sunny Day" Released: July 26, 2024; 2. "Winter Winds" Released: August 9, 2024; 3. "Lady Wingshot" Released: August 23, 2024; 4. "Thrasher" Released: August 30, 2024

Neil Young Archives Volume III: 1976–1987 is a 17-CD and 5-Blu-ray disc (comprising 11 films) box set from American-Canadian folk rock musician Neil Young that was released on CD and vinyl on September 6, 2024. Pre-ordering went live for members of Neil Young Archives on July 25, 2024, with access to a version that came with a CD sampler of 16 tracks and a pin. The release is the third box set in his Neil Young Archives series, following 2009's The Archives Vol. 1 1963–1972 and 2020's Neil Young Archives Volume II: 1972–1976, and covers an eleven-year period from 1976 to 1987.

Of the 198 tracks on the track listing, 121 are previously unreleased. These include live and alternate versions of previously released songs. Fifteen of the songs on this set have never been released in any form.

The first single for the album was released on July 26, 2024, entitled "Bright Sunny Day". The song was an outtake from the Rust Never Sleeps sessions from 1978. The lead single was followed by "Winter Winds" on August 9, "Lady Wingshot" on August 23, and "Thrasher" on August 30.

== Background ==
The first significant mention of the release of Volume III after the release of Volume II was in an article Neil wrote that was published on the Neil Young Archives site on March 26, 2021. Entitled "A Message from Neil: A Pandemic and a Rare Gift," he discussed the making of Volume III in great detail: "we continued on at the cottage in Canada with Daryl, Niko and I putting together Volume three of the archives. Seven or eight films. More discs that [sic] the other Archives Volumes. Maybe more songs. Many unreleased albums back in their original shape like we did with Homegrown when we found it." He went on to describe a box set that would end in 1990 with a live album called Live Freedom, would feature nine films, and would be released in two separate configurations: a 12-CD set and a 10 Blu-Ray set (with the Blu-Rays featuring all of the songs found on the CD version, in addition to its films). However, by July of that year, Young stated that Volume III had been "scaled back to 1987 or so."

After 2021, no further significant updates were published until 2023, when that November Young stated in a Letter to the Editor response that it would be "coming first half of 2024," while also saying in another response that it had been "delayed by me changing my mind too many times." These responses culminated in a Zoom call that was held with Neil Young Archives Patron members on the 29th of that month. In addition to laying out specifics regarding its content, including disc names and selected tracks, he mentioned that Volume III would contain, in total, "17 discs" and "four or five films."

After this meeting, in April of 2024, Young responded to a letter from a fan on his website, saying that the 22-disc set was scheduled for a release in September. This tentative date proved to be accurate once Volume III was announced on July 26th.

On July 25, 2024, pre-ordering went live for members of Young's website. A limited-edition deluxe box set was announced, featuring all 17 CDs in 11 "soft-paks" (covering 198 tracks with 121 unreleased and 15 never-released songs in 28 hours of content) and 5 Blu-rays in three "soft-paks" (covering 11 films and 14 hours of content). Super deluxe editions included a 160-page book that was "chronologically illustrated with archive materials, detailed descriptions of the music, and a fold-out timeline of the period," along with a poster. The regular deluxe edition included a 36-page booklet in lieu of the book and poster.

Also announced was Neil Young Archives Volume III: Takes, a 16-track, 2-LP release highlighting one song from all but one disc on the box set. It also came as a CD sampler along with a pin as part of the deluxe editions of the box set.

In early August 2024, the German Rolling Stone announced that their latest issue, scheduled to be released on August 30, would come with an exclusive 7" single consisting of "Heart of Gold" live at Budokan Hall in 1976, and "Comes a Time" live at the Boarding House in 1978. Both tracks would be released on the Volume III box set one week later.

=== Content ===
Neil Young's third archival release features material from 11 different years, which spans from the critically acclaimed albums, Comes a Time and Rust Never Sleeps, to experimental albums like Trans and Everybody's Rockin'. Most discs include "raps", where Young explains to the listener where and when the recording is taking place, and who he's recording with.

The first two discs, Across the Water, cover Neil Young and Crazy Horse's European and Japanese legs of their 1976 tour (something previously documented on Odeon Budokan). Hitchhikin' Judy primarily features songs from Hitchhiker (an archival album featuring a one-day studio session in August of 1976) and Songs for Judy (a live album that features Neil Young performing parts of his Crazy Horse tour solo in 1976 and 1977). A Snapshot in Time features recordings of rehearsals with Nicolette Larson and Linda Ronstadt, while Windward Passage features Young live with The Ducks (something previously covered on the Neil Young official bootleg series release High Flyin').

Oceanside Countryside is a long-rumored release, with tracks that were recorded before Comes a Time at Triad Studios in Fort Lauderdale, Florida. On January 3, 2025, Young announced its release as an individual album, in its original track listing order. It is one of Young's albums from his previously announced analog original project, designed to preserve the original sound quality. It was released on March 7, 2025 for vinyl, and April 25, 2025 for CD.

Union Hall features live recordings with Nicolette Larson, which Neil Young called "the highlight of everything I've done with Nicolette." The Boarding House discs feature Neil Young solo performing some of his newest songs in a several-day residency, while Sedan Delivery and Coastline feature studio and live sessions from Rust Never Sleeps, Hawks & Doves, and Re·ac·tor.

Trans/Johnny's Island covers both Trans and Young's unreleased studio album, Johnny's Island, which Young worked on in May of 1982, until Geffen Records suggested he shelve the project and work on something better (which turned into Trans). Evolution shows Young's various projects with Geffen, starting with songs from the unreleased Old Ways I, and evolving into his rockabilly persona, and ending off with solo demos recorded in 1984. Grey Riders features Young live and in the studio with his mid-1980s backing band, The International Harvesters, while Touch the Night is a live album with Crazy Horse culled from several February 1984 performances at The Catalyst.

The box set ends with Road of Plenty, primarily featuring Landing on Water tracks, and Summer Songs, a solo acoustic album of newly written songs in 1987. Young stated that he sat down one day and recorded a number of new songs, including harmony parts, then put them on tape (which remained on the shelf for years until 2021, when Young released it exclusively on his website).

== Track listing ==
=== Disc 1 – Across the Water I (1976) ===
1. "Let It Shine" (4:44) – previously unreleased live version
  - Neil Young – guitar, harmonica, vocals
  - Recorded at Budokan Hall, Tokyo, 3/11/1976. Produced by David Briggs and Neil Young.
2. "Mellow My Mind" (3:12) – previously unreleased live version
  - Neil Young – banjo, harmonica, vocals
  - Recorded at Budokan Hall, Tokyo, 3/11/1976. Produced by David Briggs and Neil Young.
3. "Too Far Gone" (3:15) – previously unreleased live version
  - Neil Young – guitar, vocals
  - Recorded at Budokan Hall, Tokyo, 3/11/1976. Produced by David Briggs and Neil Young.
4. "Only Love Can Break Your Heart" (3:04) – previously unreleased live version
  - Neil Young – guitar, vocals
  - Recorded at Budokan Hall, Tokyo, 3/11/1976. Produced by David Briggs and Neil Young.
5. "A Man Needs a Maid" (3:54) – previously unreleased live version
  - Neil Young – piano, vocals
  - Recorded at Budokan Hall, Tokyo, 3/11/1976. Produced by David Briggs and Neil Young.
6. "No One Seems to Know" (2:47) – previously unreleased live version
  - Neil Young – piano, vocals
  - Recorded at Budokan Hall, Tokyo, 3/11/1976. Produced by David Briggs and Neil Young.
7. "Heart of Gold" (3:44) – previously unreleased live version
  - Neil Young – guitar, harmonica, vocals
  - Recorded at Budokan Hall, Tokyo, 3/11/1976. Produced by David Briggs and Neil Young.
8. "Country Home" (5:54) – previously unreleased live version
  - Neil Young – guitar, vocals; Frank Sampedro – guitar; Billy Talbot – bass, vocals; Ralph Molina – drums, vocals
  - Recorded at Budokan Hall, Tokyo, 3/11/1976. Produced by David Briggs and Neil Young.
9. "Don't Cry No Tears" (2:42) – previously unreleased live version
  - Neil Young – guitar, vocals; Frank Sampedro – guitar; Billy Talbot – bass, vocals; Ralph Molina – drums, vocals
  - Recorded at Budokan Hall, Tokyo, 3/11/1976. Produced by David Briggs and Neil Young.
10. "Cowgirl in the Sand" (6:39) – previously unreleased mix
  - Neil Young – guitar, vocals; Frank Sampedro – guitar; Billy Talbot – bass, vocals; Ralph Molina – drums, vocals
  - Recorded at Budokan Hall, Tokyo, 3/11/1976. Produced by David Briggs and Neil Young.
11. "Lotta Love" (3:00) – previously unreleased live version
  - Neil Young – guitar, vocals; Frank Sampedro – piano, vocals; Billy Talbot – bass, vocals; Ralph Molina – drums, vocals
  - Recorded at Budokan Hall, Tokyo, 3/11/1976. Produced by David Briggs and Neil Young.
12. "The Losing End (When You're On)" (3:49) – previously unreleased live version
  - Neil Young – guitar, vocals; Frank Sampedro – guitar; Billy Talbot – bass; Ralph Molina – drums, vocals
  - Recorded at Budokan Hall, Tokyo, 3/11/1976. Produced by David Briggs and Neil Young.
13. "Southern Man" (8:03) – previously unreleased live version
  - Neil Young – guitar, vocals; Frank Sampedro – guitar; Billy Talbot – bass, vocals; Ralph Molina – drums, vocals
  - Recorded at Budokan Hall, Tokyo, 3/11/1976. Produced by David Briggs and Neil Young.
14. "Cortez the Killer" (7:39) – previously unreleased live version
  - Neil Young – guitar, vocals; Frank Sampedro – guitar, vocals; Billy Talbot – bass; Ralph Molina – drums, vocals
  - Recorded at Budokan Hall, Tokyo, 3/11/1976. Produced by David Briggs and Neil Young.

=== Disc 2 – Across the Water II (1976) ===
1. "Human Highway" (3:27) – previously unreleased live version
  - Neil Young – banjo, vocals
  - Recorded at the Hammersmith Odeon, London, 3/31/1976. Produced by Neil Young and David Briggs.
2. "The Needle and the Damage Done" (2:45) – previously unreleased live version
  - Neil Young – guitar, vocals
  - Recorded at the Hammersmith Odeon, London, 3/31/1976. Produced by Neil Young and David Briggs.
3. "Stringman" (3:43) – previously unreleased mix
  - Neil Young – piano, vocals
  - Recorded at the Hammersmith Odeon, London, 3/31/1976. Produced by Neil Young and David Briggs.
4. "Down by the River" (11:32) – previously unreleased live version
  - Neil Young – guitar, vocals; Frank Sampedro – guitar; Billy Talbot – bass, vocals; Ralph Molina – drums, vocals
  - Recorded at the Hammersmith Odeon, London, 3/31/1976. Produced by Neil Young and David Briggs.
5. "Like a Hurricane" (9:04) – previously unreleased live version
  - Neil Young – guitar, vocals; Frank Sampedro – stringman; Billy Talbot – bass, vocals; Ralph Molina – drums, vocals
  - Recorded at the Hammersmith Odeon, London, 3/31/1976. Produced by Neil Young and David Briggs.
6. "Drive Back" (5:50) – previously unreleased live version
  - Neil Young – guitar, vocals; Frank Sampedro – guitar, vocals; Billy Talbot – bass, vocals; Ralph Molina – drums, vocals
  - Recorded at the Hammersmith Odeon, London, 3/31/1976. Produced by Neil Young and David Briggs.
7. "Cortez the Killer" (8:22) – previously unreleased live version
  - Neil Young – guitar, vocals; Frank Sampedro – guitar, vocals; Billy Talbot – bass, vocals; Ralph Molina – drums, vocals
  - Recorded at the Hammersmith Odeon, London, 3/31/1976. Produced by Neil Young and David Briggs.
8. "Homegrown" (3:44) – previously unreleased live version
  - Neil Young – guitar, vocals; Frank Sampedro – guitar; Billy Talbot – bass, vocals; Ralph Molina – drums, vocals
  - Recorded at the Apollo Theater, Glasgow, 4/2/1976. Produced by Neil Young and David Briggs.

=== Disc 3 – Hitchhikin' Judy (1976–77) ===
1. "Rap" (0:09)
2. "Powderfinger" (3:25) – previously released on Hitchhiker
  - Neil Young – guitar, vocals
  - Recorded at Indigo Ranch, Malibu, 8/11/1976. Produced by David Briggs.
3. "Captain Kennedy" (2:50) – previously released on Hitchhiker
  - Neil Young – guitar, vocals
  - Recorded at Indigo Ranch, Malibu, 8/11/1976. Produced by David Briggs, Neil Young, Richard Kaplan, and Tim Mulligan.
4. "Hitchhiker" (4:39) – previously released on Hitchhiker
  - Neil Young – guitar, vocals
  - Recorded at Indigo Ranch, Malibu, 8/11/1976. Produced by David Briggs.
5. "Give Me Strength" (3:42) – previously released on Hitchhiker
  - Neil Young – guitar, harmonica, vocals
  - Recorded at Indigo Ranch, Malibu, 8/11/1976. Produced by David Briggs.
6. "The Old Country Waltz" (3:35) – previously released on Hitchhiker
  - Neil Young – piano, harmonica, vocals
  - Recorded at Indigo Ranch, Malibu at 8/11/1976. Produced by David Briggs.
7. "Rap (Intro Judy Garland)" (1:39)
8. "Too Far Gone" (3:15) – previously released on Songs for Judy
  - Neil Young – guitar, vocals
  - Recorded at Balch Fieldhouse, Boulder, Colorado, 11/6/1976. Produced by Joel Bernstein, Cameron Crowe, David Briggs, and Neil Young.
9. "White Line" (2:55) – previously released on Songs for Judy
  - Neil Young – guitar, harmonica, vocals
  - Recorded at Tarrant County Convention Center, Fort Worth, Texas, 11/10/1976. Produced by Joel Bernstein, Cameron Crowe, David Briggs, and Neil Young.
10. "Mr. Soul" (2:47) – previously released on Songs for Judy
  - Neil Young – guitar, vocals
  - Recorded at Palladium, New York City, 11/20/1976 (early show). Produced by Joel Bernstein, Cameron Crowe, David Briggs, and Neil Young.
11. "A Man Needs Needs a Maid" (4:51) – previously released on Songs for Judy
  - Neil Young – guitar, Stringman, vocals
  - Recorded at Palladium, New York City, 11/20/1976 (late show). Produced by Joel Bernstein, Cameron Crowe, David Briggs, and Neil Young.
12. "Journey Through the Past" (3:17) – previously released on Songs for Judy
  - Neil Young – piano, harmonica, vocals
  - Recorded at Music Hall, Boston, Massachusetts, 11/22/1976 (late show). Produced by Joel Bernstein, Cameron Crowe, David Briggs, and Neil Young.
13. "Campaigner" (3:30) – previously released on Songs for Judy
  - Neil Young – guitar, vocals
  - Recorded at Music Hall, Boston, Massachusetts, 11/22/1976 (late show). Produced by Joel Bernstein, Cameron Crowe, David Briggs, and Neil Young.
14. "The Old Laughing Lady" (5:18) – previously released on Songs for Judy
  - Neil Young – guitar, harmonica, vocals
  - Recorded at Fox Theatre, Atlanta, Georgia, 11/24/1976 (early show). Produced by Joel Bernstein, Cameron Crowe, David Briggs, and Neil Young.
15. "The Losing End (When You're On)" (3:47) – previously released on Songs for Judy
  - Neil Young – guitar, harmonica, vocals
  - Recorded at Fox Theatre, Atlanta, Georgia, 11/24/1976 (late show). Produced by Joel Bernstein, Cameron Crowe, David Briggs, and Neil Young.
16. "Rap (Intro The Last Waltz)" (0:24)
17. "Helpless" (5:42) – previously released on The Last Waltz
  - Neil Young – guitar, vocals; Joni Mitchell – vocals; Robbie Robertson – guitar, vocals; Rick Danko – bass, vocals; Richard Manuel – piano; Levon Helm – drums; Garth Hudson – organ, synth
  - Recorded at The Last Waltz, Winterland Ballroom, San Francisco, 11/25/1976. Produced by Robbie Roberston, Jonathan Taplin & Bill Graham.
18. "Four Strong Winds" (4:21) – previously released on The Last Waltz (2002 version)
  - Neil Young – guitar, harmonica, vocals; Joni Mitchell – vocals; Robbie Robertson – guitar; Rick Danko – bass; Richard Manuel – piano; Levon Helm – drums; Garth Hudson – organ, synth
  - Recorded at The Last Waltz, Winterland Ballroom, San Francisco, 11/25/1976. Produced by Robbie Roberston, Jonathan Taplin & Bill Graham.
19. "Rap (Intro "Will to Love")" (0:27)
20. "Will to Love" (7:13) – previously released on American Stars 'n Bars
  - Neil Young – guitar, organ, piano, vibraphone, drums, vocals
  - Recorded at Young's home and Indigo Ranch, Malibu, 12/3/1976. Produced by David Briggs and Neil Young.
21. "Lost in Space" (3:41) – previously unreleased original
  - Neil Young – piano, vocals; Ronnie Wood – guitar
  - Recorded at Broken Arrow Ranch, 12/31/1976. Produced by Neil Young and Tim Mulligan.

=== Disc 4 – Snapshot in Time (1977) ===
1. "Rap (Intro "Hold Back the Tears")" (0:14)
2. "Hold Back The Tears" (5:14) – previously released on Chrome Dreams
  - Neil Young – guitar, keyboard, percussion, vocals
  - Recorded at Indigo Ranch, Malibu, 2/6/1977. Produced by David Briggs, Neil Young and Tim Mulligan.
3. "Rap (Intro Snapshot in Time)" (0:23)
4. "Long May You Run" (2:56) – previously unreleased version
  - Neil Young – guitar, vocals; Nicolette Larson – vocals; Linda Ronstadt – vocals
  - Recorded at House, Trancas, 3/1/1977. Produced by Niko Bolas and Neil Young.
5. "Hey Babe" (3:49) – previously unreleased version
  - Neil Young – guitar, vocals; Nicolette Larson – vocals; Linda Ronstadt – vocals
  - Recorded at House, Trancas, 3/1/1977. Produced by Niko Bolas and Neil Young.
6. "The Old Country Waltz" (3:16) – previously unreleased version
  - Neil Young – guitar, vocals; Nicolette Larson – vocals; Linda Ronstadt – vocals
  - Recorded at House, Trancas, 3/1/1977. Produced by Niko Bolas and Neil Young.
7. "Hold Back the Tears" (4:04) – previously unreleased version
  - Neil Young – guitar, vocals; Nicolette Larson – vocals; Linda Ronstadt – vocals
  - Recorded at House, Trancas, 3/1/1977. Produced by Niko Bolas and Neil Young.
8. "Peace of Mind" (2:57) – previously unreleased version
  - Neil Young – guitar, vocals; Nicolette Larson – vocals; Linda Ronstadt – vocals
  - Recorded at House, Trancas, 3/1/1977. Produced by Niko Bolas and Neil Young.
9. "Sweet Lara Larue" (4:13) – previously unreleased version
  - Neil Young – guitar, vocals; Nicolette Larson – vocals; Linda Ronstadt – vocals
  - Recorded at House, Trancas, 3/1/1977. Produced by Niko Bolas and Neil Young.
10. "Bite the Bullet" (3:32) – previously unreleased version
  - Neil Young – guitar, vocals; Nicolette Larson – vocals; Linda Ronstadt – vocals
  - Recorded at House, Trancas, 3/1/1977. Produced by Niko Bolas and Neil Young.
11. "Saddle Up the Palomino" (3:51) – previously unreleased version
  - Neil Young – guitar, vocals; Nicolette Larson – vocals; Linda Ronstadt – vocals
  - Recorded at House, Trancas, 3/1/1977. Produced by Niko Bolas and Neil Young.
12. "Star of Bethlehem" (2:07) – previously unreleased version
  - Neil Young – guitar, vocals; Nicolette Larson – vocals; Linda Ronstadt – vocals
  - Recorded at House, Trancas, 3/1/1977. Produced by Niko Bolas and Neil Young.
13. "Bad News Comes To Town" (2:18) – previously unreleased version
  - Neil Young – guitar, vocals; Nicolette Larson – vocals; Linda Ronstadt – vocals
  - Recorded at House, Trancas, 3/1/1977. Produced by Niko Bolas and Neil Young.
14. "Motorcycle Mama" (3:18) – previously unreleased version
  - Neil Young – guitar, vocals
  - Recorded at House, Trancas, 3/1/1977. Produced by Niko Bolas and Neil Young.
15. "Rap (Intro American Stars 'n Bars)" (0:13)
16. "Hey Babe" (3:31) – previously released on American Stars 'n Bars
  - Neil Young – guitar, vocals; Frank Sampedro – guitar; Ben Keith – pedal steel guitar; Carole Mayedo – fiddle; Billy Talbot – bass; Ralph Molina – drums; Linda Ronstadt – vocals; Nicolette Larson – vocals
  - Recorded at Broken Arrow Ranch, 4/4/1977. Produced by David Briggs, Tim Mulligan, and Neil Young.
17. "Rap (Intro "Barefoot Floors")" (0:08)
18. "Barefoot Floors" (4:34) – previously unreleased version
  - Neil Young – guitar, vocals
  - Recorded at House, Trancas, 12/15/1977. Produced by Nicolette Larson.

=== Disc 5 – Windward Passage (1977) ===
1. "Rap (Intro the Ducks)" (0:41)
2. "I Am A Dreamer" (4:22) – previously released on High Flyin'
  - Neil Young – guitar, vocals; Jeff Blackburn – guitar, vocals; Bob Mosley – bass, vocals; Johnny Craviotto – drums, vocals
  - Recorded at Magic Devices Studio, Santa Cruz, California, 7/29/1977. Produced by Tim Mulligan, Jeff Blackburn, and Neil Young.
3. "Sail Away" (5:32) – previously unreleased original
  - Neil Young – guitar, vocals; Jeff Blackburn – guitar, vocals; Bob Mosley – bass, vocals; Johnny Craviotto – drums, vocals
  - Recorded at The Steamship, Santa Cruz, California, 8/1/1977. Produced by Tim Mulligan, Jeff Blackburn, and Neil Young.
4. "Wide Eyed and Willin'" (4:19) – previously released on High Flyin'
  - Neil Young – guitar, vocals; Jeff Blackburn – guitar, vocals; Bob Mosley – bass, vocals; Johnny Craviotto – drums, vocals
  - Recorded at Catalyst, Santa Cruz, California, 8/3/1977. Produced by Tim Mulligan, Jeff Blackburn, and Neil Young.
5. "I'm Tore Down" (3:35) – previously released on High Flyin'
  - Neil Young – guitar, vocals; Jeff Blackburn – guitar, vocals; Bob Mosley – bass, vocals; Johnny Craviotto – drums, vocals
  - Recorded at Catalyst, Santa Cruz, California, 8/3/1977. Produced by Tim Mulligan, Jeff Blackburn, and Neil Young.
6. "Little Wing" (4:44) – previously released on High Flyin'
  - Neil Young – guitar, vocals; Jeff Blackburn – guitar, vocals; Bob Mosley – bass, vocals; Johnny Craviotto – drums, vocals
  - Recorded at Catalyst, Santa Cruz, California, 8/3/1977. Produced by Tim Mulligan, Jeff Blackburn, and Neil Young.
7. "Hey Now" (2:55) – previously released on High Flyin'
  - Neil Young – guitar, vocals; Jeff Blackburn – guitar, vocals; Bob Mosley – bass, vocals; Johnny Craviotto – drums, vocals
  - Recorded at Catalyst, Santa Cruz, California, 8/3/1977. Produced by Tim Mulligan, Jeff Blackburn, and Neil Young.
8. "Windward Passage" (5:41) – previously unreleased edit
  - Neil Young – guitar; Jeff Blackburn – guitar; Bob Mosley – bass; Johnny Craviotto – drums
  - Recorded at the Crossroads, Santa Cruz, California, 8/5/1977. Produced by Tim Mulligan, Jeff Blackburn, and Neil Young.
9. "Cryin' Eyes" (3:34) – previously unreleased original
  - Neil Young – guitar, vocals; Jeff Blackburn – guitar, vocals; Bob Mosley – bass, vocals; Johnny Craviotto – drums, vocals
  - Recorded at Catalyst, Santa Cruz, California, 8/22/1977. Produced by Tim Mulligan, Jeff Blackburn, and Neil Young.

=== Disc 6 – Oceanside Countryside (1977) ===
1. "Rap (Intro "Crazy Mama")" (0:16)
2. "Field of Opportunity" (3:10) – previously unreleased mix
  - Neil Young – guitar, vocals; Nicolette Larson – vocals; Ben Keith – pedal steel guitar; Rufus Thibodeaux – fiddle; Joe Osborn – bass; Karl T. Himmel – drums
  - Recorded at Crazy Mama's, Nashville, Tennessee, 5/3/1977. Produced by Neil Young and Ben Keith.
3. "It Might Have Been" (2:33) – previously unreleased version
  - Neil Young – guitar, vocals; Ben Keith – pedal steel guitar; Rufus Thibodeaux – fiddle; Joe Osborn – bass; Karl T. Himmel – drums
  - Recorded at Crazy Mama's, Nashville, Tennessee, 5/3/1977. Produced by Neil Young and Ben Keith.
4. "Dance Dance Dance" (2:29) – previously unreleased version
  - Neil Young – guitar, vocals; Ben Keith – dobro; Rufus Thibodeaux – fiddle; Joe Osborn – bass; Karl T. Himmel – drums
  - Recorded at Crazy Mama's, Nashville, Tennessee, 5/3/1977. Produced by Neil Young and Ben Keith.
5. "Rap (Intro "Pocahontas")" (0:09)
6. "Pocahontas" (3:23) – previously unreleased mix
  - Neil Young – guitar, vocals
  - Recorded at Indigo/Triad, Fort Lauderdale, Florida, 9/4/1977. Produced by Neil Young and David Briggs.
7. "Peace of Mind" (5:34) – previously unreleased mix
  - Neil Young – piano, guitar, vocals
  - Recorded at Triad, Fort Lauderdale, Florida, 9/12/1977. Produced by Neil Young.
8. "Sail Away" (3:47) – previously unreleased mix
  - Neil Young – guitar, vocals
  - Recorded at Triad, Fort Lauderdale, Florida, 9/12/1977. Produced by Neil Young.
9. "Human Highway" (3:10) – previously unreleased mix
  - Neil Young – guitar, vocals
  - Recorded at Triad, Fort Lauderdale, Florida, 9/14/1977. Produced by Neil Young.
10. "Comes A Time" (2:41) – previously unreleased version
  - Neil Young – guitars, vocals
  - Recorded at Triiad Studios, Fort Lauderdale, 9/14/1977. Produced by Neil Young.
11. "Lost In Space" (4:18) – previously released on Hawks & Doves
  - Neil Young – 6 and 12 string guitar, vocal, vibes
  - Recorded at Triiad Recording Studios, Fort Lauderdale, 9/15/1977. Produced by Neil Young.
12. "Goin' Back" (5:05) – previously unreleased mix
  - Neil Young – guitar, stringman, vocals
  - Recorded at Triad, Fort Lauderdale, Florida, 9/16/1977. Produced by Neil Young.

=== Disc 7 – Union Hall (1977) ===
1. "Comes A Time" (3:07) – previously released on Comes A Time
  - Neil Young – guitar, harmonica, vocal; Nicolette Larson – harmony vocal; Ben Keith – steel guitar; Karl T. Himmel – Drums; Tim Drummond – bass; Spooner Oldham – piano; Rufus Thibodeaux – fiddle; J.J. Cale – acoustic guitar; Farrell Morris – percussion; Rita Fey – autoharp; Chuck Cochran – arranger; Gone with the Wind Orchestra – acoustic guitars, strings
  - Recorded at Woodland Studio, Nashville, 11/2/1977. Produced by Neil Young, Ben Keith and Tim Mulligan.
2. "Love/Art Blues" (2:50) – previously unreleased version
  - Neil Young – guitar, vocal; Ben Keith – dobro; Tim Drummond – bass; Rufus Thibodeaux – fiddle; Karl T. Himmel – drums
  - Recorded at Woodland Studio, Nashville, 11/3/1977. Produced by Neil Young and Ben Keith.
3. "Rap (Intro Union Hall)" (0:17)
4. "Are You Ready for the Country?" (4:13) – previously unreleased version
  - Neil Young – guitar, harmonica, vocals; Ben Keith – steel guitar; Spooner Oldham – piano; Tim Drummond – bass; Rufus Thibodeaux – fiddle; Karl T. Himmel – drums; Nicolette Larson – vocals
  - Recorded at the Nashvillle Musicians Union Hall, 11/10/1977. Produced by Neil Young and Tim Mulligan.
5. "Dance Dance Dance/Love Is a Rose" (4:07) – previously unreleased version
  - Neil Young – guitar, harmonica, vocals; Ben Keith – steel guitar; Spooner Oldham – piano; Tim Drummond – bass; Rufus Thibodeaux – fiddle; Karl T. Himmel – drums; Nicolette Larson – vocals
  - Recorded at the Nashvillle Musicians Union Hall, 11/10/1977. Produced by Neil Young and Tim Mulligan.
6. "Old Man" (3:44) – previously unreleased version
  - Neil Young – guitar, harmonica, vocals; Ben Keith – steel guitar; Spooner Oldham – piano; Tim Drummond – bass; Rufus Thibodeaux – fiddle; Karl T. Himmel – drums; Nicolette Larson – vocals
  - Recorded at the Nashvillle Musicians Union Hall, 11/10/1977. Produced by Neil Young and Tim Mulligan.
7. "The Losing End (When You're On)" (4:03) – previously unreleased version
  - Neil Young – guitar, harmonica, vocals; Ben Keith – steel guitar; Spooner Oldham – piano; Tim Drummond – bass; Rufus Thibodeaux – fiddle; Karl T. Himmel – drums; Nicolette Larson – vocals
  - Recorded at the Nashvillle Musicians Union Hall, 11/10/1977. Produced by Neil Young and Tim Mulligan.
8. "Heart of Gold" (3:22) – previously unreleased version
  - Neil Young – guitar, harmonica, vocals; Ben Keith – steel guitar; Spooner Oldham – piano; Tim Drummond – bass; Rufus Thibodeaux – fiddle; Karl T. Himmel – drums; Nicolette Larson – vocals
  - Recorded at the Nashvillle Musicians Union Hall, 11/10/1977. Produced by Neil Young and Tim Mulligan.
9. "Already One" (5:21) – previously unreleased version
  - Neil Young – guitar, harmonica, vocals; Ben Keith – steel guitar; Spooner Oldham – piano; Tim Drummond – bass; Rufus Thibodeaux – fiddle; Karl T. Himmel – drums; Nicolette Larson – vocals
  - Recorded at the Nashvillle Musicians Union Hall, 11/10/1977. Produced by Neil Young and Tim Mulligan.
10. "Lady Wingshot" (3:19) – previously unreleased song
  - Neil Young – guitar, harmonica, vocals; Ben Keith – steel guitar; Spooner Oldham – piano; Tim Drummond – bass; Rufus Thibodeaux – fiddle; Karl T. Himmel – drums; Nicolette Larson – vocals
  - Recorded at the Nashvillle Musicians Union Hall, 11/10/1977. Produced by Neil Young and Tim Mulligan.
11. "Four Strong Winds" (4:10) – previously unreleased version
  - Neil Young – guitar, harmonica, vocals; Ben Keith – steel guitar; Spooner Oldham – piano; Tim Drummond – bass; Rufus Thibodeaux – fiddle; Karl T. Himmel – drums; Nicolette Larson – vocals
  - Recorded at the Nashvillle Musicians Union Hall, 11/10/1977. Produced by Neil Young and Tim Mulligan.
12. "Down By The River" (8:41) – previously unreleased version
  - Neil Young – guitar, harmonica, vocals; Ben Keith – steel guitar; Spooner Oldham – piano; Tim Drummond – bass; Rufus Thibodeaux – fiddle; Karl T. Himmel – drums; Nicolette Larson – vocals
  - Recorded at the Nashvillle Musicians Union Hall, 11/10/1977. Produced by Neil Young and Tim Mulligan.
13. "Alabama" (5:44) – previously unreleased version
  - Neil Young – guitar, harmonica, vocals; Ben Keith – steel guitar; Spooner Oldham – piano; Tim Drummond – bass; Rufus Thibodeaux – fiddle; Karl T. Himmel – drums; Nicolette Larson – vocals
  - Recorded at the Nashvillle Musicians Union Hall, 11/10/1977. Produced by Neil Young and Tim Mulligan.
14. "Are You Ready For the Country?" (Reprise) (4:20) – previously unreleased version
  - Neil Young – guitar, harmonica, vocals; Ben Keith – steel guitar; Spooner Oldham – piano; Tim Drummond – bass; Rufus Thibodeaux – fiddle; Karl T. Himmel – drums; Nicolette Larson – vocals
  - Recorded at the Nashvillle Musicians Union Hall, 11/10/1977. Produced by Neil Young and Tim Mulligan.
15. "Rap (Intro Comes a Time Outtakes)" (0:05)
16. "We're Having Some Fun Now" (4:23) – previously unreleased song
  - Neil Young – guitar, vocals; Nicolette Larson – vocals; Ben Keith – steel guitar; Karl T. Himmel – drums; Tim Drummond – bass; Spooner Oldham – piano; Rufus Thibodeaux – fiddle
  - Recorded at the Sound Shop, Nashville, Tennessee, 11/17–21/1977. Produced by Neil Young, Ben Keith and Tim Mulligan.
17. "Rap (Intro "Please Help Me I'm Falling") (0:07)"
18. "Please Help Me, I'm Falling" (2:56) – previously unreleased version
  - Neil Young – guitar, vocals; Nicolette Larson – vocals; Ben Keith – steel guitar; Karl T. Himmel – drums; Tim Drummond – bass; Spooner Oldham – piano; Rufus Thibodeaux – fiddle
  - Recorded at the Sound Shop, Nashville, Tennessee, 11/21/1977. Produced by Neil Young, Ben Keith and Tim Mulligan.
19. "Motorcycle Mama" (3:09) – previously released on Comes A Time
  - Neil Young – electric guitar, vocal; Nicolette Larson – harmony vocal; Ben Keith – steel guitar; Karl T. Himmel – Drums; Tim Drummond – bass; Spooner Oldham – piano
  - Recorded at Sound Shop, Nashville, 11/21/1977. Produced by Neil Young, Ben Keith, and Tim Mulligan.

=== Disc 8 – Boarding House I (1978) ===
1. "Rap" (0:12)
2. "Shots" (5:28) – previously unreleased live version
  - Neil Young – guitar, harmonica, vocals
  - Recorded at The Boarding House, 5/24/1978. Produced by David Briggs, Joel Bernstein, Niko Bolas, and Neil Young.
3. "Ride My Llama" (3:12) – previously unreleased live version
  - Neil Young – guitar, vocals
  - Recorded at The Boarding House, 5/25/1978. Produced by David Briggs, Joel Bernstein, Niko Bolas, and Neil Young.
4. "Sail Away" (3:55) – previously unreleased live version
  - Neil Young – guitar, harmonica, vocals
  - Recorded at The Boarding House, 5/25/1978. Produced by David Briggs, Joel Bernstein, Niko Bolas, and Neil Young.
5. "Pocahontas" (3:56) – previously unreleased live version
  - Neil Young – guitar, vocals
  - Recorded at The Boarding House, 5/26/1978. Produced by David Briggs, Joel Bernstein, Niko Bolas, and Neil Young.
6. "Human Highway" (3:31) – previously unreleased live version
  - Neil Young – guitar, harmonica, vocals
  - Recorded at The Boarding House, 5/26/1978. Produced by David Briggs, Joel Bernstein, Niko Bolas, and Neil Young.
7. "Already One" (4:40) – previously unreleased live version
  - Neil Young – guitar, vocals
  - Recorded at The Boarding House, 5/26/1978. Produced by David Briggs, Joel Bernstein, Niko Bolas, and Neil Young.
8. "Birds" (2:27) – previously unreleased live version
  - Neil Young – piano, vocals
  - Recorded at The Boarding House, 5/26/1978. Produced by David Briggs, Joel Bernstein, Niko Bolas, and Neil Young.
9. "Cowgirl in the Sand" (4:10) – previously unreleased live version
  - Neil Young – guitar, vocals
  - Recorded at The Boarding House, 5/26/1978. Produced by David Briggs, Joel Bernstein, Niko Bolas, and Neil Young.
10. "Sugar Mountain" (6:27) – previously unreleased live version
  - Neil Young – guitar, harmonica, vocals
  - Recorded at The Boarding House, 5/26/1978. Produced by David Briggs, Joel Bernstein, Niko Bolas, and Neil Young.
11. "Powderfinger" (3:40) – previously unreleased live version
  - Neil Young – guitar, vocals
  - Recorded at The Boarding House, 5/26/1978. Produced by David Briggs, Joel Bernstein, Niko Bolas, and Neil Young.
12. "Thrasher" (6:18) – previously unreleased live version
  - Neil Young – guitar, harmonica, vocals
  - Recorded at The Boarding House, 5/27/1978. Produced by David Briggs, Joel Bernstein, Niko Bolas, and Neil Young.
13. "Comes a Time" (3:27) – previously unreleased live version
  - Neil Young – guitar, harmonica, vocals
  - Recorded at The Boarding House, 5/27/1978. Produced by David Briggs, Joel Bernstein, Niko Bolas, and Neil Young.

=== Disc 9 – Boarding House II (1978) ===
1. "Rap (Intro Devo)" (0:09)
2. "Hey Hey, My My (Into the Black)" (9:28) – previously unreleased version
  - Neil Young – guitar; Mark Mothersbaugh – synth, vocals; Bob Casale – guitar; Gerald Casale – bass; Alan Myers – drums; Bob Mothersbaugh – guitar
  - Recorded at Different Fur, San Francisco, 5/28/1978 (featuring Devo). Produced by Neil Young, Devo, David Briggs, and Tim Mulligan.
3. "Rap (Back to the Boarding House)" (0:05)
4. "My My, Hey Hey (Out of the Blue)" (4:04) – previously unreleased live version
  - Neil Young – guitar, harmonica, vocals
  - Recorded at The Boarding House, 5/28/1978. Produced by David Briggs, Joel Bernstein, Niko Bolas, and Neil Young.
5. "The Ways of Love" (3:31) – previously unreleased live version
  - Neil Young – guitar, vocals
  - Recorded at The Boarding House, 5/28/1978. Produced by David Briggs, Joel Bernstein, Niko Bolas, and Neil Young.
6. "Homegrown" (2:12) – previously unreleased live version
  - Neil Young – guitar, harmonica, vocals
  - Recorded at The Boarding House, 5/28/1978. Produced by David Briggs, Joel Bernstein, Niko Bolas, and Neil Young.
7. "Down by the River" (4:26) – previously unreleased live version
  - Neil Young – guitar, vocals
  - Recorded at The Boarding House, 5/28/1978. Produced by David Briggs, Joel Bernstein, Niko Bolas, and Neil Young.
8. "After the Gold Rush" (3:56) – previously unreleased live version
  - Neil Young – piano, harmonica, vocals
  - Recorded at The Boarding House, 5/28/1978. Produced by David Briggs, Joel Bernstein, Niko Bolas, and Neil Young.
9. "Out Of My Mind" (2:26) – previously unreleased live version
  - Neil Young – piano, vocals
  - Recorded at The Boarding House, 5/28/1978. Produced by David Briggs, Joel Bernstein, Niko Bolas, and Neil Young.
10. "Dressing Room" (0:22)

=== Disc 10 – Sedan Delivery (1978) ===
1. "Bright Sunny Day" (2:43) – previously unreleased song
  - Neil Young – guitar, vocals; Frank Sampedro – guitar, vocals; Billy Talbot – bass, vocals; Ralph Molina – drums, vocals
  - Recorded at Broken Arrow Ranch, 8/24/1978. Produced by Neil Young, David Briggs, and Tim Mulligan.
2. "The Loner" (5:01) – previously released on Live Rust
  - Neil Young – guitar, vocals; Frank "Poncho" Sampedro – guitar, vocals; Billy Talbot – bass, vocals; Ralph Molina – drums, vocals
  - Recorded at Chicago Stadium, 10/14/1978. Produced by David Briggs, Neil Young, and Tim Mulligan.
3. "Welfare Mothers" (3:49) – previously released on Rust Never Sleeps
  - Neil Young – guitar, vocals, percussion; Frank "Poncho" Sampedro – guitar, vocals; Billy Talbot – bass, vocals; Ralph Molina – drums, vocals
  - Recorded at St. Paul Civic Center, 10/15/1978. Produced by David Briggs, Neil Young, and Tim Mulligan.
4. "Lotta Love" (2:57) – previously released on Live Rust
  - Neil Young – guitar, vocals; Frank "Poncho" Sampedro – piano, vocals; Billy Talbot – bass, vocals; Ralph Molina – drums, vocals
  - Recorded at St. Paul Civic Center, 10/15/1978. Produced by David Briggs, Neil Young, and Tim Mulligan.
5. "Sedan Delivery" (4:41) – previously released on Rust Never Sleeps
  - Neil Young – guitar, vocals; Frank "Poncho" Sampedro – guitar, vocals; Billy Talbot – bass, vocals; Ralph Molina – drums, vocals
  - Recorded at St. Paul Civic Center, 10/15/1978. Produced by David Briggs, Neil Young, and Tim Mulligan.
6. "Cortez the Killer" (7:32) – previously released on Live Rust
  - Neil Young – guitar, vocals; Frank "Poncho" Sampedro – guitar, vocals; Billy Talbot – bass, vocals; Ralph Molina – drums, vocals
  - Recorded at St. Paul Civic Center, 10/15/1978. Produced by David Briggs, Neil Young, and Tim Mulligan.
7. "Tonight's the Night" (7:20) – previously released on Live Rust
  - Neil Young – guitar, vocals; Frank "Poncho" Sampedro – guitar, vocals; Billy Talbot – bass, vocals; Ralph Molina – drums, vocals
  - Recorded at St. Paul Civic Center, 10/15/1978. Produced by David Briggs, Neil Young, and Tim Mulligan.
8. "Powderfinger" (5:30) – previously released on Rust Never Sleeps
  - Neil Young – guitar, vocals; Frank "Poncho" Sampedro – guitar, vocals; Billy Talbot – bass, vocals; Ralph Molina – drums, vocals
  - Recorded at McNichols Arena, Denver, 10/19/1978. Produced by David Briggs, Neil Young, and Tim Mulligan.
9. "When You Dance, I Can Really Love" (3:52) – previously released on Live Rust
  - Neil Young – guitar, vocals; Frank "Poncho" Sampedro – guitar, vocals; Billy Talbot – bass, vocals; Ralph Molina – drums, vocals
  - Recorded at Cow Palace, 10/22/1978. Produced by David Briggs, Neil Young, and Tim Mulligan.
10. "Hey Hey, My My (Into the Black)" (5:14) – previously released on Rust Never Sleeps
  - Neil Young – guitar, vocals; Frank "Poncho" Sampedro – guitar, vocals; Billy Talbot – bass, vocals; Ralph Molina – drums, vocals
  - Recorded at The Cow Palace, San Francisco, 10/22/1978. Produced by David Briggs, Neil Young, and Tim Mulligan.

=== Disc 11 – Coastline (1980–81) ===
1. "Coastline" (2:28) – previously released on Hawks & Doves
  - Neil Young – piano, vocals; Greg Thomas – drums; Dennis Belfield – bass; Ben Keith – guitar, vocals; Rufus Thibodeaux – fiddle; Ann Hillary O'Brien – vocals
  - Recorded at Gold Star Studios, 7/2/1980. Produced by David Briggs, Neil Young, Tim Mulligan, and Jerry Napier.
2. "Stayin' Power" (2:19) – previously released on Hawks & Doves
  - Neil Young – piano, vocals; Greg Thomas – drums; Dennis Belfield – bass; Ben Keith – guitar, vocals; Rufus Thibodeaux – fiddle; Ann Hillary O'Brien – vocals
  - Recorded at Gold Star Studios, 7/3/1980. Produced by David Briggs, Neil Young, Tim Mulligan, and Jerry Napier.
3. "Hawks & Doves" (3:30) – previously released on Hawks & Doves
  - Neil Young – guitar, vocals; Greg Thomas – drums; Dennis Belfield – bass; Ben Keith – guitar, vocals; Rufus Thibodeaux – fiddle; Ann Hillary O'Brien – vocals
  - Recorded at Gold Star Studios, 7/4/1980. Produced by David Briggs, Neil Young, Tim Mulligan, and Jerry Napier.
4. "Comin' Apart at Every Nail" (2:37) – previously released on Hawks & Doves
  - Neil Young – guitar, vocals; Greg Thomas – drums; Dennis Belfield – bass; Ben Keith – guitar, vocals; Rufus Thibodeaux – fiddle; Ann Hillary O'Brien – vocals
  - Recorded at Gold Star Studios, 7/5/1980. Produced by David Briggs, Neil Young, Tim Mulligan, and Jerry Napier.
5. "Union Man" (2:12) – previously released on Hawks & Doves
  - Neil Young – guitar, vocals; Greg Thomas – drums; Dennis Belfield – bass; Ben Keith – guitar, vocals; Rufus Thibodeaux – fiddle; Ann Hillary O'Brien – vocals
  - Recorded at Gold Star Studios, 7/5/1980. Produced by David Briggs, Neil Young, Tim Mulligan, and Jerry Napier.
6. "Winter Winds" (3:13) – previously unreleased song
  - Neil Young – piano, vocals; Ben Keith – steel guitar, vocals; Rufus Thibodeaux – fiddle; Dennis Belfield – bass; Greg Thomas – drums; Anne Hillary O'Brien – vocals
  - Recorded at Broken Arrow Ranch, 9/6/1980. Produced by David Briggs, Tim Mulligan, and Neil Young.
7. "Southern Pacific" (4:08) – previously released on Re·ac·tor
  - Neil Young – guitar, vocals; Frank Sampedro – guitar; Billy Talbot – bass, vocals; Ralph Molina – drums, vocals
  - Recorded at Modern Recorders, Redwood City, California, 12/7/1980. Produced by David Briggs and Neil Young.
8. "Opera Star" (3:32) – previously released on Re·ac·tor
  - Neil Young – guitar, synclavier, handclaps, vocals; Frank Sampedro – guitar, vocals; Billy Talbot – bass, vocals; Ralph Molina – drums, vocals
  - Recorded at Modern Recorders, Redwood City, California, 12/8/1980. Produced by David Briggs and Neil Young.
9. "Rapid Transit" (4:36) – previously released on Re·ac·tor
  - Neil Young – guitar, vocals; Frank Sampedro – guitar; Billy Talbot – bass, vocals; Ralph Molina – drums, vocals
  - Recorded at Modern Recorders, Redwood City, California, 1/18/1981. Produced by David Briggs and Neil Young.
10. "Sunny Inside" (2:30) – previously unreleased original
  - Neil Young – piano, Synclavier, vocals; Frank Sampedro – guitar; Billy Talbot – bass; Ralph Molina – percussion, drums, vocals
  - Recorded at Modern Recorders, Redwood City, California, 6/17/1981. Produced by David Briggs, Tim Mulligan, Jerry Napier, and Neil Young.
11. "Surfer Joe and Moe the Sleaze" (4:19) – previously released on Re·ac·tor
  - Neil Young – guitar, vocals, handclaps; Frank Sampedro – guitar, vocals, handclaps; Billy Talbot – bass, vocals, handclaps; Ralph Molina – drums, percussion, vocals, handclaps
  - Recorded at Modern Recorders, Redwood City, California, 6/23/1981. Produced by David Briggs and Neil Young.
12. "Get Up" (2:27) – previously unreleased song
  - Neil Young – Wurlitzer, Synclavier, vocals; Frank Sampedro – guitar; Billy Talbot – bass, vocals; Ralph Molina – percussion, drums, vocals
  - Recorded at Modern Recorders, Redwood City, California, 7/14/1981. Produced by David Briggs, Tim Mulligan, Jerry Napier, and Neil Young.

=== Disc 12 – Trans/Johnny's Island (1981–82) ===
1. "Rap (Intro Trans)" (0:17)
2. "Sample and Hold" (5:13) – previously released on Trans
  - Neil Young – vocoder, guitar, Synclavier, vocal; Frank Sampedro – guitar; Billy Talbot – bass; Ralph Molina – drums
  - Recorded at Broken Arrow Ranch, 9/24/1981. Produced by David Briggs and Neil Young.
3. "Mr. Soul" (3:19) – previously released on Trans
  - Neil Young – vocoder, guitar, bass, Synclavier, vocal
  - Recorded at Broken Arrow Ranch, 9/25/1981. Produced by David Briggs and Neil Young.
4. "Computer Cowboy" (4:14) – previously released on Trans
  - Neil Young – vocoder, guitar, Synclavier, vocal; Frank Sampedro – guitar; Billy Talbot – bass; Ralph Molina – drums
  - Recorded at Broken Arrow Ranch, 9/30/1981. Produced by David Briggs and Neil Young.
5. "We R In Control" (3:33) – previously released on Trans
  - Neil Young – vocoder, guitar, Synclavier, vocal; Frank Sampedro – guitar; Billy Talbot – bass; Ralph Molina – drums
  - Recorded at Broken Arrow Ranch, 10/14/1981. Produced by David Briggs and Neil Young.
6. "Computer Age" (5:26) – previously released on Trans
  - Neil Young – vocoder, guitar, bass, Synclavier, vocal
  - Recorded at Broken Arrow Ranch, 10/29/1981. Produced by David Briggs and Neil Young.
7. "Transformer Man" (3:25) – previously released on Trans
  - Neil Young – vocoder, guitar, bass, Synclavier, vocal
  - Recorded at Broken Arrow Ranch, 12/11/1981. Produced by David Briggs and Neil Young.
8. "Rap (Intro "Johnny")" (0:12)
9. "Johnny" (3:30) – previously unreleased song
  - Neil Young – guitar, Synclavier, bass, keyboards, vocals; Kenney Buttrey – drums
  - Recorded at Broken Arrow Ranch, 1/1/1982. Produced by Neil Young and Tim Mulligan.
10. "Island In The Sun" (3:56) – previously unreleased song
  - Neil Young – acoustic guitar, vocals; Nils Lofgren – electric guitar, wurlitzer, vocals; Ben Keith – pedal steel guitar, vocals; Bruce Palmer – bass; Ralph Molina – drums, vocals; Joe Lala – percussion, vocals
  - Recorded at Commercial Recorders, 5/7/1982 (with the "Royal Pineapples"). Produced by Neil Young and Tim Mulligan.
11. "Rap (Intro "It's an Island")" (0:18)
12. "Silver & Gold" (3:20) – previously unreleased version
  - Neil Young – Synclavier, guitar, vocals; Nils Lofgren – Wurlitzer, vocals; Ben Keith – pedal steel guitar, vocals; Bruce Palmer – bass; Ralph Molina – drums, vocals; Joe Lala – percussion, vocals
  - Recorded at Commercial Recorders, 5/9/1982 (with the "Royal Pineapples"). Produced by Neil Young and Tim Mulligan.
13. "If You Got Love" (3:20) – previously unreleased version
  - Neil Young – acoustic guitar, vocals; Nils Lofgren – electric guitar, wurlitzer, vocals; Ben Keith – pedal steel guitar, vocals; Bruce Palmer – bass; Ralph Molina – drums, vocals; Joe Lala – percussion, vocals
  - Recorded at Commercial Recorders, 5/11/1982 (with the "Royal Pineapples"). Produced by Neil Young and Tim Mulligan.
14. "Raining in Paradise" (4:24) – previously unreleased song
  - Neil Young – guitar, vocals; Nils Lofgren – guitar, vocals; Ben Keith – pedal steel guitar, vocals; Bruce Palmer – bass; Ralph Molina – drums, vocals; Joe Lala – percussion, vocals
  - Recorded at Commercial Recorders, 5/12/1982 (with the "Royal Pineapples"). Produced by Neil Young and Tim Mulligan.
15. "Big Pearl" (3:19) – previously unreleased song
  - Neil Young – guitar, vocals; Nils Lofgren – Synclavier, wurlitzer, vocals; Ben Keith – pedal steel guitar, slide guitar, vocals; Bruce Palmer – bass; Ralph Molina – drums, vocals; Joe Lala – percussion, vocals
  - Recorded at Commercial Recorders, 5/12/1982 (with the "Royal Pineapples"). Produced by Neil Young and Tim Mulligan.
16. "Hold On To Your Love" (3:06) – previously released on Trans
  - Neil Young – electric piano, vocal; Nils Lofgren – Stringman, vocal; Ben Keith – pedal steel guitar, vocal; Bruce Palmer – bass; Ralph Molina – drums, vocal; Joe Lala – percussion, vocal
  - Recorded at Commercial Recording, Honolulu, 5/12/1982. Produced by David Briggs and Neil Young.
17. "Soul Of A Woman" (3:40) – previously unreleased original
  - Neil Young – guitar, vocals; Nils Lofgren – Wurlitzer; Ben Keith – slide guitar; Bob Mosley – bass; Ralph Molina – drums; Joe Lala – percussion
  - Recorded at Sherwood Hall, Salinas California, 8/11/1982. Produced by Neil Young and Tim Mulligan.
18. "Rap (Intro Johnny's Island)" (0:07)
19. "Love Hotel" (3:37) – previously unreleased song
  - Neil Young – guitar, vocals; Nils Lofgren – Synclavier, vocals; Ben Keith – piano; Bruce Palmer – bass; Ralph Molina – drums; Joe Lala – percussion
  - Recorded at National Exhibition Centre Arena, Birmingham, England, 9/24/1982. Produced by Neil Young and Tim Mulligan.

=== Disc 13 – Evolution (1983–84) ===
1. "California Sunset" (2:54) – previously unreleased original
  - Neil Young – banjo, harmonica, vocals
  - Recorded at Santa Cruz Civic Auditorium, California, 1/5/1983. Produced by Neil Young and Tim Mulligan.
2. "My Boy" (2:58) – previously unreleased original
  - Neil Young – banjo, harmonica, vocals
  - Recorded at Santa Cruz Civic Auditorium, California, 1/5/1983. Produced by Neil Young and Tim Mulligan.
3. "Old Ways" (3:46) – previously unreleased version
  - Neil Young – guitar, vocals; Ben Keith – dobro; Karl T. Himmel – drums; Tim Drummond – bass; Rufus Thibodeaux – fiddle; Spooner Oldham – organ; Anthony Crawford, Rick Palombi, Larry Byrom – vocals
  - Recorded at House of David, Nashville, 1/28/1983. Produced by Elliot Mazer and Neil Young.
4. "Depression Blues" (4:09) – previously released on Lucky Thirteen
  - Neil Young – guitar, harmonica, vocals; Spooner Oldham – organ; Ben Keith – pedal steel guitar; Rufus Thibodeaux – fiddle; Tim Drummond – bass; Karl Himmel – drums; Rick Palombi – vocals; Anthony Crawford – vocals; Larry Byrom – vocals
  - Recorded at House of David, Nashville, 1/28/1983. Produced by Elliot Mazer and Neil Young.
5. "Cry, Cry, Cry" (2:38) – previously released on Everybody's Rockin'
  - Neil Young – piano, vocals; Ben Keith – guitar; Tim Drummond – bass; Karl Himmel – drums; Rick Palombi – vocals; Anthony Crawford – vocals; Larry Byrom – vocals
  - Recorded at Broken Arrow Ranch, 4/27/1983. Produced by Elliot Mazer and Neil Young.
6. "Mystery Train" (2:47) – previously released on Everybody's Rockin'
  - Neil Young – guitar, vocals; Ben Keith – guitar; Tim Drummond – bass; Karl Himmel – drums; Rick Palombi – vocals; Anthony Crawford – vocals; Larry Byrom – vocals
  - Recorded at Broken Arrow Ranch, 4/28/1983. Produced by Elliot Mazer and Neil Young.
7. "Payola Blues" (3:09) – previously released on Everybody's Rockin'
  - Neil Young – piano, harmonica, vocals; Ben Keith – guitar; Tim Drummond – bass; Karl Himmel – drums; Rick Palombi – vocals; Anthony Crawford – vocals; Larry Byrom – vocals
  - Recorded at Broken Arrow Ranch, 5/23/1983. Produced by Elliot Mazer and Neil Young.
8. "Betty Lou's Got A New Pair Of Shoes" (3:01) – previously released on Everybody's Rockin'
  - Neil Young – guitar, vocals; Ben Keith – saxophone; Tim Drummond – bass; Karl Himmel – snare; Rick Palombi – vocals; Anthony Crawford – vocals; Larry Byrom – piano, vocals
  - Recorded at Broken Arrow Ranch, 5/24/1983. Produced by Elliot Mazer and Neil Young.
9. "Bright Lights, Big City" (2:17) – previously released on Everybody's Rockin'
  - Neil Young – guitar, harmonica, vocals; Ben Keith – guitar; Tim Drummond – bass; Karl Himmel – drums; Rick Palombi – vocals; Anthony Crawford – vocals; Larry Byrom – piano, vocals
  - Recorded at Broken Arrow Ranch, 5/24/1983. Produced by Elliot Mazer and Neil Young.
10. "Rainin' in My Heart" (2:10) – previously released on Everybody's Rockin'
  - Neil Young – piano, harmonica, vocals; Ben Keith – guitar; Tim Drummond – bass; Karl Himmel – drums; Rick Palombi – vocals; Anthony Crawford – vocals; Larry Byrom – vocals
  - Recorded at Broken Arrow Ranch, 5/25/1983. Produced by Elliot Mazer and Neil Young.
11. "Get Gone" (6:12) – previously unreleased original
  - Neil Young – guitar, keyboards, harmonica, vocoder, vocals; Ben Keith – guitar; Larry Byrom – piano, vocals; Anthony Crawford – maracas, vocals; Craig Hayes – baritone saxophone; Tim Drummond – bass; Karl T. Himmel – drums; Rick Palombi – tambourine, vocals
  - Recorded at Convention Center, San Antonio, 7/18/1983. Produced by Elliot Mazer and Neil Young.
12. "I Got A Problem" (3:02) – previously unreleased original
  - Neil Young – LinnDrum, Simmons drums, synclavier, vocals
  - Recorded at Broken Arrow Ranch, 8/25/1983. Produced by Neil Young and Tim Mulligan.
13. "Hard Luck Stories" (3:55) – previously unreleased original
  - Neil Young – LinnDrum, Simmons drums, synclavier, vocals
  - Recorded at Broken Arrow Ranch, early 1/1984. Produced by Neil Young and Tim Mulligan.
14. "Your Love" (3:37) – previously unreleased version
  - Neil Young – LinnDrum, electric guitar, harmonica, synclavier, vocals
  - Recorded at Broken Arrow Ranch, early 1/1984. Produced by Neil Young and Tim Mulligan.
15. "If You Got Love" (5:00) – previously unreleased version
  - Neil Young – LinnDrum, synth bass, harmonica, synclavier, vocals
  - Recorded at Broken Arrow Ranch, early 1/1984. Produced by Neil Young and Tim Mulligan.
16. "Razor Love" (5:08) – previously unreleased version
  - Neil Young – LinnDrum, Simmons drums, synclavier, vocals
  - Recorded at Broken Arrow Ranch, early 1/1984. Produced by Neil Young and Tim Mulligan.

=== Disc 14 – Touch the Night (1984) ===
1. "Rock" (4:07) – previously unreleased song
  - Neil Young – guitar, vocals; Frank Sampedro – guitar; Billy Talbot – bass, vocals; Ralph Molina – drums, vocals; Ben Keith – alto saxophone
  - Recorded at the Catalyst, Santa Cruz, California, 2/7/1984. Produced by Neil Young and Tim Mulligan.
2. "So Tired" (3:28) – previously unreleased song
  - Neil Young – guitar, vocals; Frank Sampedro – guitar; Billy Talbot – bass, vocals; Ralph Molina – drums, vocals
  - Recorded at the Catalyst, Santa Cruz, California, 2/7/1984. Produced by Neil Young and Tim Mulligan.
3. "Violent Side" (6:25) – previously unreleased live version
  - Neil Young – guitar, vocals; Frank Sampedro – guitar, vocals; Billy Talbot – bass, vocals; Ralph Molina – drums, vocals
  - Recorded at the Catalyst, Santa Cruz, California, 2/7/1984. Produced by Neil Young and Tim Mulligan.
4. "I Got A Problem" (3:52) – previously unreleased live version
  - Neil Young – guitar, vocals; Frank Sampedro – guitar; Billy Talbot – bass, vocals; Ralph Molina – drums, vocals; Ben Keith – Synclavier
  - Recorded at the Catalyst, Santa Cruz, California, 2/7/1984. Produced by Neil Young and Tim Mulligan.
5. "Your Love" (4:44) – previously unreleased song
  - Neil Young – guitar, vocals; Frank Sampedro – guitar; Billy Talbot – bass, vocals; Ralph Molina – drums, vocals
  - Recorded at the Catalyst, Santa Cruz, California, 2/7/1984. Produced by Neil Young and Tim Mulligan.
6. "Barstool Blues" (4:37) – previously unreleased live version
  - Neil Young – guitar, vocals; Frank Sampedro – guitar; Billy Talbot – bass, vocals; Ralph Molina – drums, vocals
  - Recorded at the Catalyst, Santa Cruz, California, 2/7/1984. Produced by Neil Young and Tim Mulligan.
7. "Welfare Mothers" (4:39) – previously unreleased live version
  - Neil Young – guitar, vocals; Frank Sampedro – guitar; Billy Talbot – bass, vocals; Ralph Molina – drums, vocals
  - Recorded at the Catalyst, Santa Cruz, California, 2/7/1984. Produced by Neil Young and Tim Mulligan.
8. "Touch The Night" (11:11) – previously unreleased live version
  - Neil Young – guitar, vocals; Frank Sampedro – guitar; Billy Talbot – bass, vocals; Ralph Molina – drums, vocals; Ben Keith – alto saxophone
  - Recorded at the Catalyst, Santa Cruz, California, 2/7/1984. Produced by Neil Young and Tim Mulligan.

=== Disc 15 – Grey Riders (1984–85) ===
1. "Amber Jean" (3:28) – previously unreleased original
  - Neil Young – guitar, harmonica, vocals; Ben Keith – pedal steel guitar; Anthony Crawford – guitar, vocals; Rufus Thibodeaux – fiddle; Spooner Oldham – piano; Tim Drummond – bass; Karl T. Himmel – drums
  - Recorded at Saddle Rack, San Jose, California, 6/6/1984. Produced by Neil Young and Tim Mulligan.
2. "Get Back To The Country" (3:23) – previously unreleased original
  - Neil Young – guitar, vocals; Ben Keith – pedal steel guitar; Anthony Crawford – mandolin, vocals; Larry Cragg – banjo; Rufus Thibodeaux – fiddle; Spooner Oldham – piano; Tim Drummond – bass; Karl T. Himmel – drums
  - Recorded at Saddle Rack, San Jose, California, 6/6/1984. Produced by Neil Young and Tim Mulligan.
3. "Are You Ready For The Country?" (3:38) – previously released on A Treasure
  - Neil Young – guitar, vocals; Ben Keith – pedal steel guitar; Anthony Crawford – guitar, vocals; Rufus Thibodeaux – fiddle; Spooner Oldham – piano; Tim Drummond – bass; Karl T. Himmel – drums
  - Recorded at Riverbend Music Center, Cincinnati, Ohio, 9/21/1984. Produced by Neil Young and Ben Keith.
4. "It Might Have Been" (2:43) – previously released on A Treasure
  - Neil Young – guitar, vocals; Ben Keith – pedal steel guitar; Anthony Crawford – fiddle, vocals; Rufus Thibodeaux – fiddle; Spooner Oldham – piano; Tim Drummond – bass; Karl T. Himmel – drums
  - Recorded at Austin City Limits, 9/25/1984. Produced by Neil Young and Ben Keith.
5. "Bound For Glory" (5:59) – previously released on A Treasure
  - Neil Young – guitar, vocals; Ben Keith – pedal steel guitar; Anthony Crawford – guitar, vocals; Rufus Thibodeaux – fiddle; Spooner Oldham – organ; Tim Drummond – bass; Karl T. Himmel – drums
  - Recorded at Gilley, Pasadena, Texas, 9/29/1984. Produced by Neil Young and Ben Keith.
6. "Let Your Fingers Do the Walking" (3:03) – previously released on A Treasure
  - Neil Young – guitar, vocals; Ben Keith – pedal steel guitar; Anthony Crawford – guitar, vocals; Rufus Thibodeaux – fiddle; Spooner Oldham – piano; Tim Drummond – bass; Karl T. Himmel – drums
  - Recorded at Universal Amphitheatre, Universal City, 10/22/1984. Produced by Neil Young and Ben Keith.
7. "Soul of a Woman" (4:28) – previously released on A Treasure
  - Neil Young – guitar, vocals; Ben Keith – lap slide guitar; Anthony Crawford – guitar, vocals; Rufus Thibodeaux – fiddle; Spooner Oldham – piano; Tim Drummond – bass; Karl T. Himmel – drums
  - Recorded at Greek Theatre, Berkeley, 10/26/1984. Produced by Neil Young and Ben Keith.
8. "Misfits (Dakota)" (5:23) – previously unreleased live version
  - Neil Young – guitar, vocals; Ben Keith – pedal steel guitar, vocals; Anthony Crawford – guitar, vocals; Rufus Thibodeaux – fiddle; Frank Sampedro – guitar; Billy Talbot – bass; Ralph Molina – drums
  - Recorded at the Entertainment Centre, Sydney, New South Wales, Australia, 3/14/1985. Produced by Neil Young and Tim Mulligan.
9. "Nothing is Perfect" (3:48) – previously unreleased version
  - Neil Young – guitar, vocals; Terry McMillan – harmonica; Hargus Robbins – piano; Rufus Thibodeaux, Gordon Terry – fiddle; Joe Allen – bass; Karl T. Himmel – drums; Matraca Ber, Gail Davies – vocals
  - Recorded at Castle Recording Studios, Franklin, Tennessee, 6/30/1985. Produced by David Briggs, Neil Young and Ben Keith.
10. "Time Off For Good Behavior" (3:40) – previously unreleased song
  - Neil Young – guitar, vocals; Larry Byrom – guitar, vocals; Hargus Robbins – piano; Joe Allen – bass; Karl T. Himmel – drums
  - Recorded at Bennet House, Franklin, Tennessee, 7/1/1985. Produced by David Briggs, Neil Young and Ben Keith.
11. "This Old House" (5:32) – previously unreleased original
  - Neil Young – guitar, vocals; Ben Keith – pedal steel guitar, vocals; Anthony Crawford – guitar, vocals; Rufus Thibodeaux – fiddle; Hargus Robbins – piano; Joe Allen – bass; Karl T. Himmel – drums
  - Recorded at State Fair, Springfield, Illinois, 8/12/1985. Produced by Neil Young and Tim Mulligan.
12. "Southern Pacific" (7:51) – previously released on A Treasure
  - Neil Young – guitar, vocals; Ben Keith – pedal steel guitar; Anthony Crawford – banjo, vocals; Rufus Thibodeaux – fiddle; Hargus Robbins – piano; Joe Allen – bass; Karl T. Himmel – drums
  - Recorded at Minnesota State Fair, St. Paul, 9/1/1985. Produced by Neil Young and Ben Keith.
13. "Interstate" (5:12) – previously unreleased live version
  - Neil Young – guitar, vocals; Anthony Crawford – guitar; Rufus Thibodeaux – fiddle; Ben Keith – stringman; Hargus Robbins – piano; Joe Allen – bass; Karl T. Himmel – drums
  - Recorded at Mann Music Center, Philadelphia, Pennsylvania 9/7/1985. Produced by Neil Young and Tim Mulligan.
14. "Grey Riders" (5:57) – previously released on A Treasure
  - Neil Young – guitar, vocals; Ben Keith – pedal steel guitar; Anthony Crawford – guitar, vocals; Rufus Thibodeaux – fiddle; Hargus Robbins – piano; Joe Allen – bass; Karl T. Himmel – drums
  - Recorded at Pier 84, New York City, 9/10/1985. Produced by Neil Young and Ben Keith.

=== Disc 16 – Road of Plenty (1984–86) ===
1. "Drifter" (5:04) – previously released on Landing on Water
  - Neil Young – guitar, harmonica, synth, vocals; Steve Jordan – drums, synth, vocals; Danny Kortchmar – guitar, synth, vocals
  - Recorded at Record One Studios, Sherman Oaks, California, 10/30/1985. Produced by Danny Kortchmar and Neil Young.
2. "Hippie Dream" (4:13) – previously released on Landing on Water
  - Neil Young – guitar, harmonica, synth, vocals; Steve Jordan – drums, synth, vocals; Danny Kortchmar – guitar, synth, vocals
  - Recorded at Record One Studios, Sherman Oaks, California, 11/21/1985. Produced by Danny Kortchmar and Neil Young.
3. "Bad News Beat" (3:17) – previously released on Landing on Water
  - Neil Young – guitar, harmonica, synth, vocals; Steve Jordan – drums, synth, vocals; Danny Kortchmar – guitar, synth, vocals
  - Recorded at Record One Studios, Sherman Oaks, California, 11/25/1985. Produced by Danny Kortchmar and Neil Young.
4. "People On The Street" (4:33) – previously released on Landing on Water
  - Neil Young – guitar, harmonica, synth, vocals; Steve Jordan – drums, synth, vocals; Danny Kortchmar – guitar, synth, vocals
  - Recorded at Record One Studios, Sherman Oaks, California, 12/4/1985. Produced by Danny Kortchmar and Neil Young.
5. "Weight of the World" (3:41) – previously released on Landing on Water
  - Neil Young – guitar, harmonica, synth, vocals; Steve Jordan – drums, synth, vocals; Danny Kortchmar – guitar, synth, vocals
  - Recorded at Record One Studios, Sherman Oaks, California, 1/28/1986. Produced by Danny Kortchmar and Neil Young.
6. "Pressure" (2:46) – previously released on Landing on Water
  - Neil Young – guitar, harmonica, synth, vocals; Steve Jordan – drums, synth, vocals; Danny Kortchmar – guitar, synth, vocals
  - Recorded at Record One Studios, Sherman Oaks, California, 3/17/1986. Produced by Danny Kortchmar and Neil Young.
7. "Road of Plenty" (7:28) – previously unreleased song
  - Neil Young – guitar, vocals; Frank Sampedro – guitar; Billy Talbot – bass; Ralph Molina – drums
  - Recorded at the Community War Memorial Auditorium, Rochester, New York, 9/15/1986. Produced by Neil Young and Tim Mulligan.
8. "We Never Danced" (4:11) – previously unreleased original
  - Neil Young – guitar, vocals; Frank Sampedro – guitar, vocals; Billy Talbot – bass, vocals; Ralph Molina – drums, vocals; Joel Bernstein, Larry Cragg – keyboards
  - Recorded at the James L. Knight Center, Miami, Florida, 10/28/1986. Produced by Neil Young and Tim Mulligan.
9. "When Your Lonely Heart Breaks" (5:10) – previously unreleased original
  - Neil Young – guitar, vocals; Frank Sampedro – synth, vocals; Billy Talbot – bass, vocals; Ralph Molina – drums, vocals
  - Recorded at the Reunion Arena, Dallas, Texas, 11/8/1986. Produced by Neil Young and Tim Mulligan.

=== Disc 17 – Summer Songs (1987) ===
1. "Rap (Intro)" (0:24)
2. "American Dream" (4:39) – previously released exclusively on Neil Young Archives website
  - Neil Young – guitar, vocals
  - Recorded at Broken Arrow Ranch, 1987. Produced by Neil Young and Niko Bolas.
3. "Someday" (6:32) – previously released exclusively on Neil Young Archives website
  - Neil Young – piano, vocals
  - Recorded at Broken Arrow Ranch, 1987. Produced by Neil Young and Niko Bolas.
4. "For the Love of Man" (4:19) – previously released exclusively on Neil Young Archives website
  - Neil Young – piano, vocals
  - Recorded at Broken Arrow Ranch, 1987. Produced by Neil Young and Niko Bolas.
5. "One of These Days" (4:34) – previously released exclusively on Neil Young Archives website
  - Neil Young – piano, vocals
  - Recorded at Broken Arrow Ranch, 1987. Produced by Neil Young and Niko Bolas.
6. "Wrecking Ball" (4:06) – previously released exclusively on Neil Young Archives website
  - Neil Young – piano, vocals
  - Recorded at Broken Arrow Ranch, 1987. Produced by Neil Young and Niko Bolas.
7. "Hanging on a Limb" (4:40) – previously released exclusively on Neil Young Archives website
  - Neil Young – guitar, vocals
  - Recorded at Broken Arrow Ranch, 1987. Produced by Neil Young and Niko Bolas.
8. "Name of Love" (5:15) – previously released exclusively on Neil Young Archives website
  - Neil Young – guitar, vocals
  - Recorded at Broken Arrow Ranch, 1987. Produced by Neil Young and Niko Bolas.
9. "Last of His Kind" (3:48) – previously released exclusively on Neil Young Archives website
  - Neil Young – guitar, harmonica, Synclavier, vocals
  - Recorded at Broken Arrow Ranch, 1987. Produced by Neil Young, Tim Mulligan, Niko Bolas.
10. "Rap (Outro)" (0:14)

=== Blu-ray discs ===
1. Across the Water
2. Boarding House, Rust Never Sleeps
3. Human Highway, Trans, Neil Young in Berlin
4. Solo Trans, Catalyst, A Treasure
5. In a Rusted Out Garage, Muddy Track

== Archives Vol. III – Takes ==
In addition to the two box set configurations, a 2 LP version was released that compiles some of the highlights of Volume III (one track representing 16 of its 17 discs).

=== Track listing ===
==== Side A ====
1. "Hey Babe" (3:50) – Snapshot in Time
2. "Drive Back" (5:50) – Across the Water II
3. "Hitchhiker" (4:40) – Hitchhikin' Judy
4. "Let It Shine" (4:44) – Across the Water I

==== Side B ====
1. "Sail Away" (5:32) – Windward Passage
2. "Comes a Time" (2:42) – Oceanside Countryside
3. "Lady Wingshot" (3:19) – Union Hall
4. "Thrasher" (6:19) – Boarding House I

==== Side C ====
1. "Hey Hey, My My (Into the Black)" (9:29) – Boarding House II
2. "Bright Sunny Day" (2:43) – Sedan Delivery
3. "Winter Winds" (3:13) – Coastline
4. "If You Got Love" (3:20) – Trans/Johnny's Island

==== Side D ====
1. "Razor Love" (5:09) – Evolution
2. "This Old House" (5:32) – Grey Riders
3. "Barstool Blues" (4:38) – Touch the Night
4. "Last of His Kind" (3:48) – Summer Songs

== Production ==
Credits adapted from Neil Young Archives.

- Neil Young – production, audio tape research, art direction and design, assistance in research and compiling
- Niko Bolas – production, digital editing, additional mastering
- Tim Mulligan – production, digital editing, mastering, assistance in research and compiling, production assistance
- John Hanlon – audio editing
- John Hausmann – audio editing, audio tape research, production assistance
- Geoff Neal, Clint Welander, Sean Badum – assistant engineering (Boarding House)
- John Nowland – audio tape restoration, analog-to-digital transferring
- Tal Miller – audio tape restoration, analog-to-digital transferring
- Jamie Howarth – cassette restoration
- Jeff Pinn – technical support
- Andrew Medelson, Chris Bellman – additional mastering
- Bonnie Levetin, Cindi Peters – production coordination, image and licensing clearances
- Joel Bernstein – audio tape research, art direction and design (book), research and compiling, production assistance
- John O'Neill – archiving, art direction (book), research and compiling, production
- Jenice Heo – art direction and design (box art and "soft-paks")
- Toshi Onuki – art direction and design
- Alex Tenta – art direction and design (book)
- Hannah Johnson – research and compiling, production
- Frank Gironda – direction
- Liela Crosset, Zeke Young – production assistance

== Charts ==
Chart performance for Neil Young Archives Volume III: 1976–1987
Chart (2024)	Peak position
Austrian Albums (Ö3 Austria)	68
Belgian Albums (Ultratop Flanders)	41
French Albums (SNEP)	200
German Albums (Offizielle Top 100)	23
Swiss Albums (Schweizer Hitparade)	46
