= Live Rust =

Live album by Neil Young and Crazy Horse
- Released: November 14, 1979
- Recorded: October 1978
- Venues: Cow Palace, Daly City; Boston Garden, Boston; Civic Center, St. Paul; Chicago Stadium, Chicago; McNichols Arena, Denver
- Genres: Hard rock; country rock
- Length: 71:47
- Label: Reprise
- Producers: David Briggs; Tim Mulligan; Neil Young

Neil Young chronology
Rust Never Sleeps (1979)	Live Rust (1979)	Hawks & Doves (1980)

Crazy Horse chronology
Rust Never Sleeps (1979)	Live Rust (1979)	Re·ac·tor (1981)

Singles from Live Rust
- 1. "The Loner" / "Cinnamon Girl" Released: February 1980

Professional ratings
Review scores
Source	Rating
Allmusic	4.5/5 stars
Christgau's Record Guide	A−

Live Rust is a live album by Neil Young and Crazy Horse, recorded during their fall 1978 Rust Never Sleeps tour.

Live Rust is composed of performances recorded at several venues, including the Cow Palace near San Francisco. Young also directed a companion film, Rust Never Sleeps, under a pseudonym "Bernard Shakey", which consisted of footage from the Cow Palace.

The CD version of the album was slightly edited to fit on a single compact disc, which were limited to 74 minutes at the time this album was first issued on CD. In 2014, a remastered, high-resolution download was made available on the Pono store, restoring the album to its original length.

Between tracks 2 and 3 on side 2 there is a stage announcement calling for people to get off of a tower and comments on an ongoing rainstorm. This is actually taken from Woodstock, almost a decade prior where Young performed as a member of Crosby, Stills, Nash & Young.

== Track listing ==
Adapted from original LP labels. All tracks written by Neil Young, except "My My, Hey Hey (Out of the Blue)" by Neil Young and Jeff Blackburn.
Crazy Horse appears on all tracks, except side one and "The Needle and the Damage Done". All tracks recorded 10/22/1978 at Cow Palace, Daly City, CA, except where noted.

Side one
No.	Title	Recording date/venue	Length
1.	"Sugar Mountain"		4:53
2.	"I Am a Child"		2:53
3.	"Comes a Time"		3:05
4.	"After the Gold Rush"	10/4/1978 at Boston Garden, Boston, MA	3:38
5.	"My My, Hey Hey (Out of the Blue)"		3:49

Side two
No.	Title	Recording date/venue	Length
1.	"When You Dance I Can Really Love"		3:39
2.	"The Loner"	10/14/1978 at Chicago Stadium, Chicago, IL	4:51
3.	"The Needle and the Damage Done"	10/15/1978 at St. Paul Civic Center, St. Paul, MN	2:12
4.	"Lotta Love"	10/15/1978 at St. Paul Civic Center, St. Paul, MN	2:51
5.	"Sedan Delivery"		4:46

Side three
No.	Title	Recording date/venue	Length
1.	"Powderfinger"		5:29
2.	"Cortez the Killer"	10/15/1978 at St. Paul Civic Center, St. Paul, MN	7:25
3.	"Cinnamon Girl"	10/19/1978 at McNichols Arena, Denver, CO	3:08

Side four
No.	Title	Recording date/venue	Length
1.	"Like a Hurricane"	10/14/1978 at Chicago Stadium, Chicago, IL	7:10
2.	"Hey Hey, My My (Into the Black)"		4:59
3.	"Tonight's the Night"	10/15/1978 at St. Paul Civic Center, St. Paul, MN	6:59
Total length:			71:47

== Rust Never Sleeps film ==
A film, Rust Never Sleeps, was released on August 15, 1979, in the US, featuring the October 22, 1978, concert performance at the Cow Palace.

Track listing:

1. Sugar Mountain
2. I Am a Child
3. Comes a Time
4. After the Gold Rush
5. Thrasher
6. My My, Hey Hey (Out of the Blue)
7. When You Dance I Can Really Love
8. The Loner
9. Welfare Mothers
10. The Needle and the Damage Done
11. Lotta Love
12. Sedan Delivery
13. Powderfinger
14. Cortez the Killer
15. Cinnamon Girl
16. Like a Hurricane
17. Hey Hey, My My (Into the Black)
18. Tonight's the Night [not present in the theatrical release, only in video releases]

== Personnel ==
- Neil Young – lead vocals, 12-string acoustic guitar (on 1–3, 5), acoustic guitar (on 6, 10 & 11), lead electric guitar (on 7–9, 12–18), harmonica (1–6), piano (on 4), production

Crazy Horse

- Frank Sampedro – rhythm guitar (on 6–7, 10, 12–16), keyboards (on 9, 11), backing vocals
- Billy Talbot – bass (on 6, 7, & 9–16), backing vocals
- Ralph Molina – drums (on 6, 7, & 9–16), backing vocals

Additional roles

- David Briggs – production
- Tim Mulligan – production
- Elliot Roberts – direction

== Charts ==
Album

Chart (1979–80)	Peak position
New Zealand Albums (RMNZ)	1
Norwegian Albums (VG-lista)	27
UK Albums (Official Charts)	55
US Billboard 200	15
Canadian Album (RPM)	27
Australian Albums (ARIA)	21
Finnish Albums (IFPI)	18
US Cashbox Albums	15
US Record World Albums	18

Singles

Year	Single	Chart	Peak Position
1979	"Hey Hey, My My (Into the Black)"	US Billboard Hot 100	79

Year End Chart

Year	Chart	Position
1980	Billboard Year End Chart	85
1980	Cashbox Year End Chart	72
1980	New Zealand Albums (RMNZ)	5

== Certifications ==
Region	Certification	Certified units/sales
United Kingdom (BPI)	Gold	100,000^{^}
United States (RIAA)	Platinum	1,000,000^{^}
^{^} Shipments figures based on certification alone.
