= Oceanside Countryside =

Studio album by Neil Young
- Released: March 7, 2025
- Recorded: May–December 1977
- Genre: Country
- Length: 38:07
- Label: Reprise
- Producers: David Briggs; Tim Mulligan; Neil Young; Ben Keith; Elliott Mazer

Neil Young chronology
Neil Young Archives Volume III: 1976–1987 (2024)	Oceanside Countryside (2025)	Coastal: The Soundtrack (2025)

Oceanside Countryside is the forty-eighth studio album by Canadian/American country musician Neil Young. Originally recorded in 1977, the album was finally released almost 50 years later as a part of the Neil Young Archives, a series dedicated to archiving Young's unreleased music.

== Background ==
In 1977, Neil Young recorded 10 tracks he planned to include on his ninth studio release, Comes a Time. One of the recordings would never officially see the light of day until Oceanside Countryside, with every other song on the album being released on other Young albums. As Young wrote: "This analogue original album, recorded in 1977, was unreleased at the time. These songs are the original mixes done at the time of the recordings. I sang the vocals and played the instruments on Oceanside, in Florida at Triad studios and Malibu, at Indigo studio. I sang the vocals and recorded with my great band of friends at Crazy Mama’s in Nashville on Countryside. I hope you enjoy this treasure of an Analog Original recording as much as I do."

== Album cover ==
The album cover shows Neil Young wearing sunglasses, a cowboy hat and a plaid shirt.

== Reception ==
Professional ratings
Aggregate scores
Source	Rating
Metacritic	77/100
Review scores
Source	Rating
AllMusic	3.5/5 stars
Clash	7/10
Classic Rock	4/5 stars
The Independent	3/5 stars
The Irish Times	4/5 stars
The Line of Best Fit	8/10
Mojo	4/5 stars
musicOMH	4/5 stars
The Telegraph	4/5 stars
Uncut	8/10

On Metacritic', a review aggregator site that compiles reviews from mainstream publications and assigns a weighted average score out of 100, Oceanside Countryside received a "generally favorable reviews" score of 77, based on eleven reviews. In an AllMusic review, Fred Thomas called it "another strong chapter in Young's ongoing crawl through the vaults", while noting that that it is "a different way to experience some familiar tunes, and yet another window into one of the more vibrant periods of Young's ever-shifting creativity." Nick Roseblade called it a "country-tinged acoustic album", noting that all songs are different to their previously released versions, Roseblade specifically states to like "The Old Homestead", stating the new version "feels slower and more relaxed", Roseblade ends his review of the album by stating that it "conjures something more poetic". Ed Power of the Irish Times states the album starts "as many great Neil Young records do, with a fluttering harmonica and gently lulling acoustic guitar of Sail Away, with Young painting an emotive picture of what he regards as the idealised lifestyle.", stating the album "takes inspiration from all over", calling it a "wonderful record" and "a keepsake to treasure" The Line of Best Fit critic Janne Onionen states that it "provides a snapshot of Young in the middle of his 1970s winning streak, possibly the most creatively fertile run that any songwriter has ever had the good fortune to find themselves in." Ross Horton called it a "winner, from a strange time in Young's career", noting that "It's a very enjoyable, consistent and relaxing listen that doesn't come with any of the luggage of many of Young's Heavier releases". David Gill states that "Basically, this is the kind of album The Dude from "The Big Lebowski" would have on his walkman to chill to when not listening to the sounds of bowling", noting that "There's a simple Southern California stoner vibe to the whole endeavor that somehow avoids the schmaltz of The Eagles, who The Dude really doesn't like", calling it "emblematic of our current zeitgeist that these artifacts, which reveal the vagaries of artistic intent along with the fickleness of market forces in the previous century, appear before us now, as expensive relics that attest to a purer creative time than we find ourselves in today." Nieve Elis states it "feels like a time capsule that, for newer fans, opens up a fresh route into discovering his work, offering different iterations of songs that have cropped up on various albums across several decades", noting that it "might not offer anything that hasn't been heard before, making 'Oceanside Countryside' a skip for some die-hards, other long-time fans will find fresh nuance to these 'new' songs, no matter how subtle their changes may be". The Telegraph critic Andrew Perry states it "captures the maverick Canadian songsmith in relaxed mood", stating the music "wonderful. It's supremely chilled yet deeply soulful, a dream soundtrack for early-summer evenings – should we ever scrape clear of this bitter winter." Austin Saalman notes that Oceanside "stands as the album's stronger half", summarizing that it "suggests that Young had yet to shake the murky despair of his famously mournful “Ditch” Trilogy.", Saalman states Countryside "finds Young accompanied by his band, immersing themselves in the era’s now-iconic Nashville scene", ending that the songs "appear here in their most naked and unvarnished forms, lending Oceanside Countryside much of its appeal" and that it "offers healthy doses of both, rendering it a worthwhile listen for modern audiences seeking a bit of prophetic poetry as well-suited to the current era of doom and gloom as it was the tumultuous 1970s." Michael Galluchi stated in his review of the album for Ultimate Classic Rock that it "isn't as revelatory as the other formerly shelved records from the era, it does give a new perspective to songs such as the opening "Sail Away" (later on Rust Never Sleeps), "Field of Opportunity" (without Nicolette Larson's backing vocals that were added for Comes a Time) and "Dance Dance Dance," which Young first recorded in 1969 with Crazy Horse for another unreleased album before that band released a version on their 1971 self-titled debut, stating it "offers a more pure depiction of the time".

== Track listing ==
All songs are written by Neil Young.

Oceanside:

1. "Sail Away" – 3:49
2. "Lost in Space" – 4:21
3. "Captain Kennedy" – 2:52
4. "Goin' Back" – 5:08
5. "Human Highway" – 3:11

Countryside:

1. "Field of Opportunity" – 3:08
2. "Dance Dance Dance" – 2:33
3. "The Old Homestead" – 7:10
4. "It Might Have Been" – 2:36
5. "Pocahontas" – 3:26

== Personnel ==
Track personnel is according to Uncut:

=== Side one ===
==== "Sail Away" ====
- Neil Young – guitar, vocals

==== "Lost in Space" ====
- Neil Young – guitar, vocals

==== "Captain Kennedy" ====
- Neil Young – guitar, harmonica, piano, vocals
- Greg Thomas – drums
- Dennis Belfield – bass
- Ben Keith – steel guitar, Dobro
- Rufus Thibodeaux – fiddle

==== "Goin' Back" ====
- Neil Young – guitar, stringman, vocals

==== "Human Highway" ====
- Neil Young – guitar, vocals

=== Side two ===
==== "Field of Opportunity" ====
- Neil Young – guitar, vocals
- Ben Keith – pedal steel guitar
- Rufus Thibodeaux – fiddle
- Joe Osborn – bass
- Karl T. Himmel – drums

==== "Dance Dance Dance" ====
- Neil Young – guitar, vocals
- Ben Keith – Dobro
- Rufus Thibodeaux – fiddle
- Joe Osborn – bass
- Karl T. Himmel – drums

==== "The Old Homestead" ====
- Neil Young – guitar, harmonica, piano
- Levon Helm – drums
- Tim Drummond – bass
- Ben Keith – steel guitar, Dobro
- Rufus Thibodeaux – fiddle
- Tom Scribner – saw player

==== "It Might Have Been" ====
- Neil Young – guitar, vocal
- Ben Keith – Dobro
- Rufus Thibodeaux – fiddle
- Joe Osborn – bass
- Karl T. Himmel – drums

==== "Pocahontas" ====
- Neil Young – guitar, vocals

== Charts ==
Chart performance for Oceanside Countryside
Chart (2025)	Peak position
German Albums (Offizielle Top 100)	24
US Top Album Sales (Billboard)	29
US Indie Store Album Sales (Billboard)	12
US Vinyl Albums (Billboard)	17
