= Muddy Track =

Documentary film by Neil Young

- Directed by: Bernard Shakey
- Produced by: L.A. Johnson
- Starring: Neil Young and Crazy Horse
- Cinematography: Neil Young; David Briggs; Niko Bolas; Brian Bell; Billy Talbot; Harlan Goodman; Contant Meyer
- Edited by: Glen Scantlebury
- Music by: Neil Young and Crazy Horse
- Release date: 2015
- Running time: 72 minutes
- Language: English

Muddy Track is a documentary film by Neil Young (under the alias Bernard Shakey), made during his 1986/7 European tour with Crazy Horse. In 2015 Muddy Track was premiered in cinemas as a part of "Shakey Films Retrospective". Since 2018 it has also been sporadically available for streaming for paid subscribers on Young's Archives website. It was given an official DVD release in 2021, and in 2024 as a Blu-ray in the Neil Young Archives Volume III: 1976–1987 box set.

== Background ==
Neil Young made his directorial debut with the 1973 film Journey Through the Past and later directed the 1982 comedy film Human Highway.

== Production ==
Muddy Track was created during Neil Young's 1986-87 European tour with Crazy Horse. Large portions of the film were shot by Young himself.

== Release ==
In April 2015, the film was screened alongside Human Highway at the IFC Center for a retrospective on Young's directorial work.

Sections of the film were featured in the 1997 Jim Jarmusch documentary Year of the Horse, which followed Young's 1996 tour with Crazy Horse.

== Information ==
Shot largely with a handheld camera (dubbed "Otto" by Young), Muddy Track documents a difficult tour of Europe, plagued by poor weather, dwindling ticket sales, backstage arguments and audience riots.

In an interview with Mojo magazine in 1995, Young claimed that Muddy Track was among the favorites of all his films: "It's dark as hell. God, it's a heavy one! [...] But it's funky."
