= DAP Products =

Sealant manufacturing company

DAP Products Inc.
- The DAP "putty knife" logo
- Formerly: Dicks-Armstrong-Pontius
- Company type: Subsidiary
- Industry: Home repair and building materials
- Founded: 1957; 69 years ago
- Headquarters: Baltimore, Maryland, US
- Area served: Worldwide
- Parent: RPM
- Website: www.dap.com

DAP Products, Inc. is a manufacturer of latex caulks, silicone sealants, adhesives, insulating foams, and patch & repair products. DAP has been made in the USA since 1864 and headquartered in Baltimore, MD since 1998.

DAP Products Inc. is an operating company of RPM International. RPM International Inc., a holding company, manufactures coatings, sealants, and specialty chemicals.

== History ==
DAP began in 1865, when Robert H. Dicks and Elmer Wiggim began producing sealing wax for food canning in Dicks' garage in Dayton, Ohio. In 1906, Dicks bought out Wiggim and joined with George Pontius, incorporating their partnership in 1913 as the Dicks-Pontius Company. When Robert Dicks died, his son John entered the business and expanded it to include putty and caulk manufacturing in bulk form.

In the 1940s and 1950s, the Dicks-Pontius Company began selling caulks and sealants in disposable cartridges. Through the 1950s, the company grew through several acquisitions, including a merger with the Chicago-based Armstrong Company in 1957. The resulting entity was renamed Dicks-Armstrong-Pontius, which was eventually shortened to the brand name DAP. DAP was the first to the market with the introduction of latex caulk in 1964, and since then the company has introduced numerous other caulks, sealants, insulating foams and other patch and repair products. They followed with acrylic latex technology in 1970 and silicone sealants in the mid-1980s. In the 1990s, the Plastic Wood brand was integrated into the DAP portfolio of products, and between 2004 and 2006, DAP acquired both Phenoseal and Custom Building Products ready-mix repair products.

DAP has three manufacturing plants and four distribution facilities in the United States, Canada and Mexico, serving North America and the world. Its products are sold in more than 60,000 retail stores throughout North and Latin America.
