= Hey Hey, My My (Into the Black) =

1979 song by Neil Young

Single by Neil Young and Crazy Horse

from the album Rust Never Sleeps
- B-side: "My My, Hey Hey (Out of the Blue)"
- Released: August 27, 1979
- Recorded: October 22, 1978
- Venue: The Cow Palace, Daly City, California
- Genre: Hard rock; proto-grunge
- Length: 5:18
- Label: Reprise
- Songwriter: Neil Young
- Producers: Neil Young; David Briggs; Tim Mulligan

Neil Young and Crazy Horse singles chronology
"Four Strong Winds" (1978)	"Hey Hey, My My (Into the Black)" (1979)	"The Loner (Live)" (1980)

"Hey Hey, My My (Into the Black)" is a song written by Canadian-American musician Neil Young. Combined with its acoustic counterpart "My My, Hey Hey (Out of the Blue)", it bookends Young's 1979 album Rust Never Sleeps. The song was influenced by the punk rock zeitgeist of the late 1970s, in particular by Young's collaborations with the American art punk band Devo, and what he viewed as his own growing irrelevance.

== Origins ==
The song "Hey Hey, My My...", as well as the title of the album on which it was featured, Rust Never Sleeps, sprang from Young's collaborations with Devo and, in particular, the band's frontman, Mark Mothersbaugh. In 1977, Devo had been asked by Young to participate in the creation of his film, Human Highway, and a scene in the film shows Young playing the song in its entirety with Devo (with Mothersbaugh changing a lyric about "Johnny Rotten" to "Johnny Spud").

On May 28, 1978, Young collaborated with Devo on a version of "Hey Hey, My My (Into the Black)" at the Different Fur studio in San Francisco and would later introduce the song to Crazy Horse. During the Different Fur studio sessions, Mothersbaugh added the lyrics "rust never sleeps", a slogan he remembered from his graphic arts career that promoted the automobile rust proofing product Rust-Oleum. Young adopted the line and used it in the Crazy Horse version of the song, as well as for the title of his album. The lyrics from counterpart My My, Hey Hey (Out of the Blue), "it's better to burn out than to fade away" were widely quoted by his peers and by critics. The line "It's better to burn out than it is to rust" is often credited to Young's friend Jeff Blackburn of The Ducks.

According to Young, the version of the song on Rust Never Sleeps is the same as that on Live Rust, except that for the Rust Never Sleeps version they removed the crowd noise and added sound effects such as hand claps and slamming doors in the studio.

== Reception ==
Cash Box called it a "grinding three-chord rocker" that makes "a challenging musical and lyrical statement" with "thrashing drums and brash fuzz guitar." Record World called it "a perfect anthem with its slam-bang 'rock'n'roll will never die.'"

Texas author and journalist Brad Tyer wrote in the Houston Press that "Hey Hey, My My" was stylistically "proto-grunge grunt rock".

== Legacy ==
The song appeared on Young's Greatest Hits in 2004 and was included at #93 in Bob Mersereau's book The Top 100 Canadian Singles in 2010. The Chromatics version was used as the closing music in HBO's The Sex Lives of College Girls season 1, episode 1.

Oasis covered the song during their 2000 world tour, including it on their live album and DVD Familiar to Millions. The band acknowledged Kurt Cobain's attachment to both versions of the song by dedicating it to him when they played it in Seattle on the sixth anniversary of his death.

== Personnel ==
- Neil Young – guitar, vocals
- Frank Sampedro – guitar, vocals
- Billy Talbot – bass, vocals
- Ralph Molina – drums, vocals

== Sources ==
- McDonough, Jimmy (2002). Shakey: Neil Young's Biography. New York City, NY: Random House. ISBN 978-0-679-42772-8. OCLC 47844513.
