= RPM International =

American industrial company

RPM International Inc.

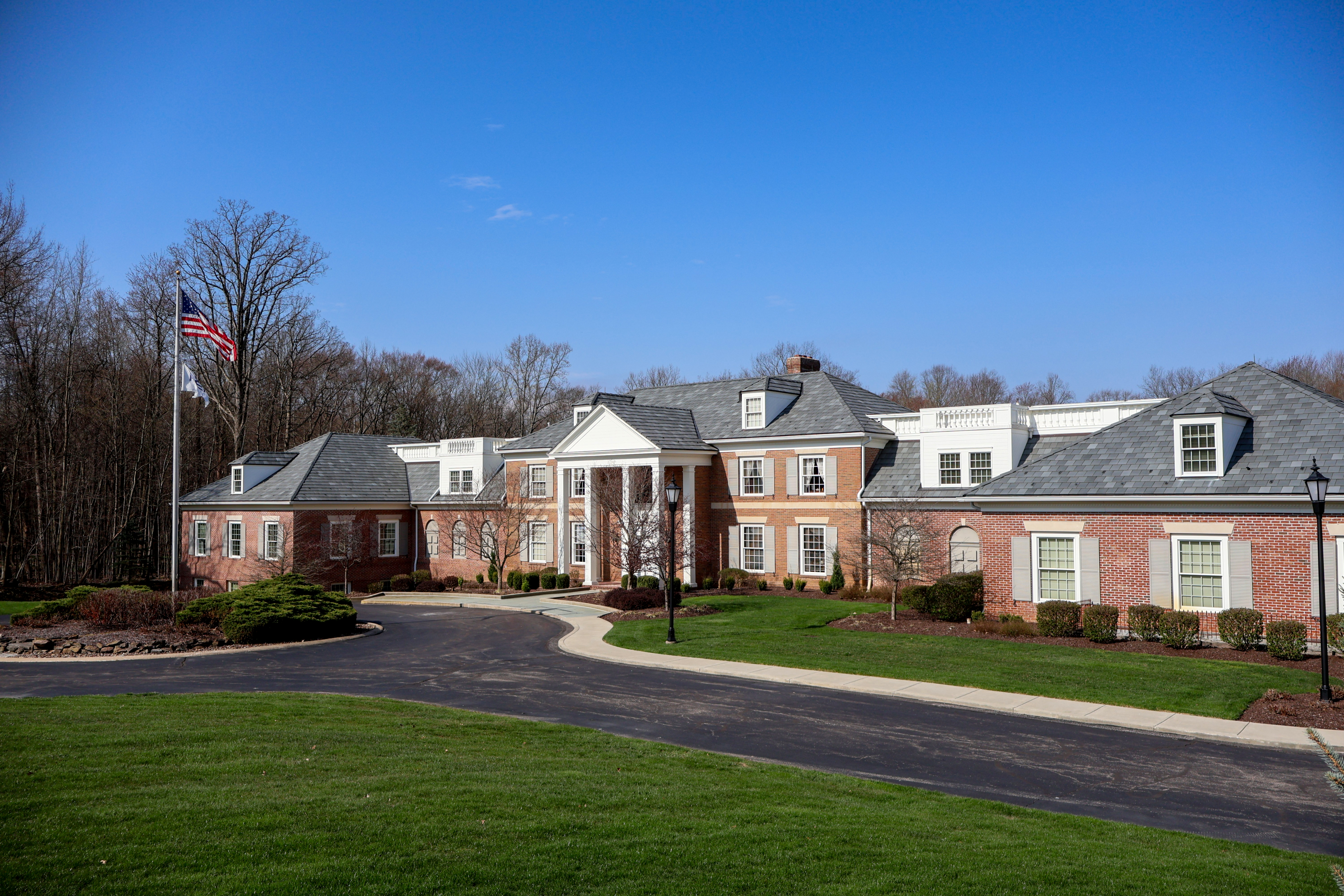
- Corporate headquarters in Medina, Ohio
- Type: Public
- Traded as: NYSE: RPM; S&P 400 component
- Industry: Paint; Coatings; Industrial coatings Building Materials; Sealants; Adhesives
- Founded: 1947; 79 years ago as Republic Powdered Metals Inc.
- Headquarters: Medina, Ohio, U.S.
- Key people: Frank C. Sullivan (Chairman and CEO); Russell L. Gordon (CFO)
- Revenue: ▲US$$7.4 billion (2025)
- Operating income: ▲US$865.2 million (2025)
- Net income: ▲US$688.7 million (2025)
- Total assets: ▲US$7.8 million (2025)
- Total equity: ▲US$2.9 million (2025)
- Number of employees: 16,300 (2026)
- Website: www.rpminc.com

RPM International Inc. is an American multinational company with subsidiaries that manufacture and market specialty coatings, sealants and building materials. Industrial brands include Tremco, Carboline, Universal Sealants, Stonhard, Nudura, Euco, Day-Glo and Dryvit. RPM's consumer products are used by professionals and DIY-ers for home maintenance and improvement and by hobbyists. Consumer brands include Rust-Oleum, DAP, Zinsser, Varathane, Mean Green, Krud Kutter, and The Pink Stuff.

The company is headquartered in Medina, Ohio, and has approximately 17,800 employees and operates 118 manufacturing facilities around the world. Its products are sold in 159 countries and territories. It is the fifth largest paint and coating company in the world.

RPM is publicly traded on the New York Stock Exchange under the symbol RPM. It ranks among the top 200 in total shares held by BetterInvesting investment clubs. RPM has increased its cash dividend paid to stockholders for 52 consecutive years. Only 39 other companies, besides RPM, have consecutively paid an increasing annual dividend for this period of time or longer, according to Stock Analysis.

Over the five-year period from May 31, 2020, to 2025, RPM outperformed its peer group by 7.7 percent in total return generated for its shareholders, which includes both capital appreciation and reinvestment of dividends.

== Segments ==
Effective June 1, 2025, RPM reorganized its business operations from four segments into three: Construction Products Group, Performance Coatings Group, and the Consumer Group. As part of this restructuring, the former Specialty Products Group was dissolved, and its individual business units were integrated into the three remaining segments.

- Construction Products Group products are sold to distributors, contractors and end-users over a large geographic footprint that spans approximately 115 countries and territories. About 39% of RPM's net sales are generated by the Construction Products Group. CPF Europe was established in the UK on 1 June 2020. It brings together RPM brands including illbruck, Flowcrete, Nullifire, Tremco, Vandex and Dryvit.
- Performance Coatings Group products are sold worldwide to contractors and distributors, as well as directly to end‑users with a unique supply-and-apply model serving manufacturers, public institutions and other commercial customers. The Performance Coatings Group generates approximately 27% of RPM's total sales.
- The Consumer Group manufactures and markets professional use and do-it-yourself products for a variety of consumer applications, including home improvement and personal leisure activities. The consumer segment's major manufacturing and distribution operations are located primarily in North America, along with a few locations in Europe, Australia, South Africa and South America. Its products are sold directly to mass merchandisers, home improvement centers, hardware stores, paint stores, craft shops, cosmetic companies and distributors. Approximately 34% of RPM's net sales are generated by the Consumer Group.

== History ==
In May 1947, Frank C. Sullivan founded Republic Powdered Metals, the forerunner to RPM International Inc. The company manufactured and sold a heavy-duty aluminum roof coating called Alumanation, which is still sold today. Sales in the first year reached $90,000.

In 1963, after more than 15 years of private ownership, Republic Powdered Metals sold 25,000 shares of common stock to the public in an intrastate offering in Ohio. The company was listed on the then-newly established National Association of Securities Dealers Automated Quotation System (NASDAQ) in 1971 and traded under the symbol RPOW. It moved to the New York Stock Exchange in 1998 and began trading under the symbol RPM.

In August 1971, Frank Sullivan died suddenly. Later that same year, RPM, Inc. was formed to become a holding company to develop a more aggressive acquisition program in a rapidly consolidating paint and coatings industry. Frank's son, Thomas C. Sullivan, who was previously president of Republic Powdered Metals, became chairman and chief executive officer of the holding company. He and James A. Karman, who was elected president and chief operating officer in 1978, led RPM for more than three decades.

After more than 30 years at the company's helm, Sullivan and Karman retired as executive officers of the company in 2002. During their tenure, net sales increased to $2 billion from $11 million, net income increased to $101.6 million from $0.6 million, cash dividends per share increased to $0.50 from $0.0035 (split-adjusted), and a $1,000 investment in RPM shares in 1971 would have been worth more than $100,000. Tom Sullivan died in 2020 at the age of 83.

Tom was succeeded by his son, Frank C. Sullivan, who became president and chief executive officer in 2002.

RPM earned a position on the Fortune 500 list in 1994, 2021 and 2024.

== Legal Issues ==
In August 2013, RPM paid $61 million to settle U.S. General Services Administration claims regarding a subsidiary's overcharging the U.S. government on roofing contracts.

In June 2014, the SEC launched an investigation into the timing of RPM's disclosure and accrual of loss reserves involving the GSA settlement. The company subsequently restated its results for the first, second and third quarters of fiscal 2013. The restatements had no impact on its audited results for the fiscal year ended May 31, 2013.

On September 9, 2016, the SEC charged RPM and its general counsel, Edward W. Moore, with violating antifraud provisions of Federal securities laws by failing to disclose a material loss. According to the SEC's complaint Moore did not inform RPM's CEO, CFO, audit committee and independent auditors of material facts about the U.S. Department of Justice investigation into the GSA issue. The company stated that it believed the allegations to be without merit and that it intended to defend itself in court. On December 23, 2020, the SEC announced that the company and Moore agreed to pay more than $2 million to settle the SEC's charges without admitting or denying the allegations of the complaint.
