= Sedan Delivery =

Song by Neil Young

from the album Rust Never Sleeps
- Released: July 2, 1979
- Recorded: October 15, 1978
- Studio: St. Paul Civic Center
- Genre: Hard rock, punk rock
- Length: 4:40
- Label: Reprise
- Songwriter: Neil Young
- Producers: Neil Young; David Briggs; Tim Mulligan

"Sedan Delivery" is a song written by Neil Young that was first released on his 1979 album with Crazy Horse, Rust Never Sleeps.

== Background ==
"Sedan Delivery" was originally recorded during the Zuma sessions in 1975, and was to be included on the unreleased Chrome Dreams album in 1977. As with "Powderfinger" (and another Chrome Dreams song, "Captain Kennedy"), "Sedan Delivery" was offered to Lynyrd Skynyrd for them to possibly include on their Street Survivors album, but Lynyrd Skynyrd ultimately passed on all of them.

== Music and lyrics ==
The version of "Sedan Delivery" on Rust Never Sleeps is a different arrangement to the original unreleased version; much of the Rust Never Sleeps version is taken at a very fast speed, consistent with that of many punk rock songs of the time. Young has stated that the new faster arrangement was inspired by Devo in attitude. The song sometimes slows down, only to speed up again. Allmusic critic Matthew Greenwald describes these slowed down bridge passages as being "almost psychedelic." Music critic Johnny Rogan interprets the varying tempos as complementing the confusion of the lyrics.

The lyrics go through a number of varying scenes, which Williamson describes as "surreal." The narrator starts by singing about beating a woman with varicose veins in a game of pool. He then sings about visiting the dentist, seeing a movie about Caesar and Cleopatra, and delivering chemicals to a mad scientist. Greenwald interprets the lyrics as a "stream-of-consciousness diatribe of the modern world and a young person's state of confusion." Rolling Stone interprets the song as being the opposite of Young's earlier song "Tonight's the Night" in that in "Tonight's the Night" a working man is destroyed by drugs while in "Sedan Delivery" the narrator is a workingman whose job is to distribute drugs. Author Ken Bielen agrees that the narrator is probably a drug dealer, based on the fact that the one delivery he makes is of "chemicals and sacred roots." In 2014, Rolling Stone interpreted the last lines "Sedan delivery is a job I know I'll keep/It sure was hard to find" as reflecting the narrator's resolve to keep hustling despite the pressures of the job. But Rolling Stone critic Paul Nelson interpreted these lines slightly differently in 1979. He interpreted them as demonstrating the narrator's pride in his job, despite the danger, possibly reflecting Young's own pride in his job.

== Reception ==
In 2014, Rolling Stone rated "Sedan Delivery" to be the #30 Neil Young song of all time.

== Personnel ==
- Neil Young – guitar, vocals
- Frank Sampedro – guitar, vocals
- Billy Talbot – bass, vocals
- Ralph Molina – drums, vocals

== Other appearances ==
Neil Young and Crazy Horse performed "Sedan Delivery" live on the live album Live Rust, released later in 1979. Another live version was released on the 1997 live album Year of the Horse.

The Feelies released a cover version of "Sedan Delivery" in 1986 on the four song EP, "No One Knows," which takes its name from the song, released around the same time as their 1986 album The Good Earth., which included two songs from the album, and two covers.
