= Powderfinger (song) =

Song by Neil Young

from the album Rust Never Sleeps
- Released: July 2, 1979
- Recorded: October 19, 1978
- Studio: McNichols Sports Arena, Denver
- Genre: Rock
- Length: 5:30
- Label: Reprise
- Songwriter: Neil Young
- Producers: Neil Young; David Briggs; Tim Mulligan

"Powderfinger" is a song written by Neil Young, first released on his 1979 album Rust Never Sleeps. It subsequently appeared on several of Young's live recordings. A 2014 Rolling Stone special issue on Young ranked it as Young's best song ever.

It has been covered by Band of Horses, Cowboy Junkies, Beat Farmers, Rusted Root, Jazz Mandolin Project, Feelies spin-off Yung Wu, Car Seat Headrest, and Phish. The Australian rock band Powderfinger took their name from this song.

It is ranked number 450 on Rolling Stone's list of The 500 Greatest Songs of All Time.

== Lyrics and music ==
"Powderfinger" is the first song of the second, electric, side of Rust Never Sleeps. Allmusic critic Jason Ankeny describes the song, following the album's mellower, acoustic first side, as "a sudden, almost blindsiding metamorphosis, which is entirely the point — it's the shot you never saw coming." The lyrics are the posthumous narration of a young man who attempts to protect his family against an approaching gunboat. He realizes that all of the older men are unavailable, leaving him "to do the thinking". After initial indecision, he eventually takes action, and is ultimately killed. He describes his death with the gruesome line "my face splashed in the sky." Johnny Rogan describes the last verse as the character's "moving epitaph":

Just think of me as one you never figured
Would fade away so young
With so much left undone
Remember me to my love; I know I'll miss her

The lines about fading away so young echo the line "it's better to burn out than to fade away", which Young sings on the opening song of Rust Never Sleeps, "My My, Hey Hey (Out of the Blue)". Ankeny feels that the song's first-person narrative "evokes traditional folk storytelling" but the music is "incendiary rock & roll", and praises the "mythical proportions" of Young's guitar solos as the story approaches its "harrowing" conclusion. Allmusic critic William Ruhlmann described the song as "remarkable", considering it the best of the great songs on Rust Never Sleeps. Rogan describes it as one of "Young's great narrative songs" and "almost cinematic in execution." Rogan also praises Crazy Horse's backing as "ideal" and permitting Young to "invest the song with epic significance." Rolling Stone critic Paul Nelson compared the violence in the song to the helicopter scene with Robert Duvall in the movie Apocalypse Now in that it is "both appalling and appealing — to us and to its narrator — until it's too late." According to Nelson, it generates "traumatizing" tension and "unbearable" empathy and fascination as he "tightens the screws on his youthful hero with some galvanizing guitar playing, while Crazy Horse cuts loose with everything they've got." Nelson points out that the music incorporates "a string of ascending [guitar] notes cut off by a deadly descending chord", what critic Greil Marcus described as "fatalism in a phrase".

Rolling Stone contributing editor Rob Sheffield calls "Powderfinger" "an exorcism of male violence with shotgun power chords rising to the challenge of punk rock." (The song does not, however, use power chords). Author Ken Bielen compares "Powderfinger" to film noir because the narrator has died before the song begins, and notes that the song "has remained in high regard over the decades." Bielen regards the theme as "the tragic and wasteful loss of youth to conflicts between countries and their leaders. Nelson suggests that although it opens the Crazy Horse rock 'n' roll side of the Rust Never Sleeps, it is the album's "purest folk narrative". On Rolling Stone's "500 Greatest Albums of All Time" list they state that on "Powderfinger" "Young's guitar hits the sky like never before." Critic Dave Marsh claimed that "Young wrote as brilliant a statement of American nihilism and despair as any rock writer has created."

== Personnel ==
- Neil Young – guitar, vocals
- Frank Sampedro – guitar, vocals
- Billy Talbot – bass, vocals
- Ralph Molina – drums, vocals

== History ==
Young recorded a solo acoustic version of "Powderfinger" at Indigo Ranch Recording Studio in Malibu, California in September 1975, and intended it for his unreleased mid-70s album Chrome Dreams. He later sent the tape to his friend Ronnie Van Zant of Lynyrd Skynyrd who were to use the song on their next album. However, Van Zant died in a plane crash in October 1977, and Lynyrd Skynyrd never recorded the song. The song was officially released in an electric version on Young's 1979 album with the band Crazy Horse, Rust Never Sleeps. The Indigo take was released in 2017 on Hitchhiker alongside other tracks from the session.
