= Rust-Oleum =

American paint manufacturer

- Rust-Oleum logo

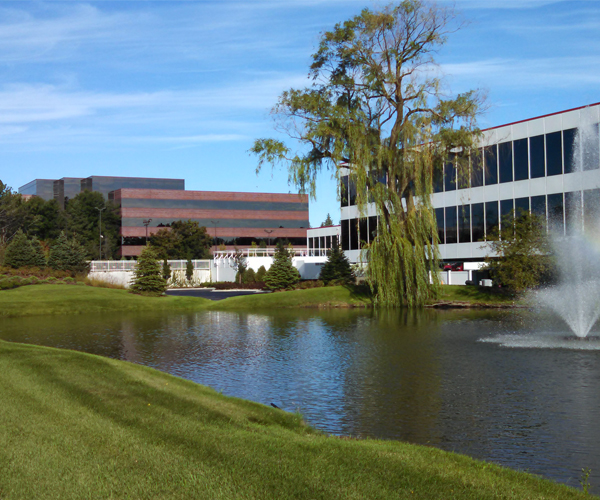
- Corporate Headquarters in Vernon Hills, IL
- Type: Subsidiary of RPM International
- Industry: Paint; Coatings
- Founded: 1921; 105 years ago Evanston, Illinois, U.S.
- Founder: Robert Fergusson
- Headquarters: Vernon Hills, Illinois, U.S.
- Area served: Worldwide
- Key people: Jeff Ackerberg (President); Mike Beccastro - EVP Jason Olson - VP
- Products: Paint; Floor Coatings; Wood Stains; Cleaners
- Revenue: ▲US$ 1 Billion (FY 2014)
- Number of employees: 1,000 (December 2016)
- Website: rustoleum.com

Rust-Oleum is a manufacturer of protective paints and coatings for home and industrial use. It was founded in 1921 by Robert Fergusson, a sea captain, after he noticed that fish oil spilled on rusty metal decks stopped corrosion from spreading. He soon incorporated whale oil into the formula, although many changes have been made over the years. Rust-Oleum products no longer contain whale oil, instead using resins derived from alkyds, polyurethanes, epoxies, synthetic latex, etc.

Rust-Oleum remained a family-owned company until 1994, when it was acquired by current owner RPM International Inc. In 2015, the company reached one billion dollars in revenue. Key brands include Stops Rust, High Performance, NeverWet, Painter's Touch, Universal, Varathane, Zinsser, and Watco. The company acquired Synta Inc., in 2012, Krud Kutter, Inc. and Citadel Restoration and Repair, Inc. in 2014, and Seal Krete in 2016. On the basis of market share, Rust-Oleum holds the top position in the U.S. and Canada in the rust-preventative, decorative, specialty and professional segments of the small-project paint category.

In 1979 the company's slogan, "Rust Never Sleeps", was adopted by Neil Young (upon a suggestion by Mark Mothersbaugh of Devo) as a name for an album.

== Facilities ==
Rust-Oleum Corporation's corporate headquarters are in Vernon Hills, Illinois, a northern suburb of Chicago. Rust-Oleum manufactures product in Pleasant Prairie, Wisconsin; Hagerstown, Maryland; Tulsa, Oklahoma; Lesage, West Virginia; and multiple other locations in the United States and Europe.

Helmut Jahn designed the corporate headquarters building which has the appearance of a steamboat, including pipes adorning the atrium.

== Corporate culture ==
The Chicago Tribune has ranked Rust-Oleum among the top mid-sized workplaces in the region in 2013, 2014, and 2015.

== Sport venue ==
Vernon Hills High School's football stadium is named Rust-Oleum Field, as the company donated $100,000 in exchange for 20 year naming rights. Additionally, Libertyville High School's baseball program receives sponsorship from the corporation.

== Brands ==
- American Accents
- Automotive
- LeakSeal
- Metallic Accents
- Rocksolid
- Stops Rust
- Universal
- Zinsser
- EpoxyShield
- Watco
- Testors
- Roto Rooter

== Official partners ==
- Rust-Tech in South Africa
- MROkart in India
- Elram Professional Adhesives Ltd in Israel
