= Rust Never Sleeps =

Studio album with live recordings by Neil Young with Crazy Horse
- Released: June 22, 1979
- Recorded: September 4, 1977 – October 22, 1978
- Venues: The Boarding House, San Francisco; McNichols Arena, Denver; St. Paul Civic Center; Cow Palace, Daly City
- Studios: Indigo Ranch, Malibu; Triiad Studios, Ft. Lauderdale; Woodland, Nashville
- Genres: Folk rock; hard rock; proto-grunge
- Length: 38:16
- Label: Reprise
- Producers: Neil Young; David Briggs; Tim Mulligan

Neil Young chronology
Comes a Time (1978)	Rust Never Sleeps (1979)	Live Rust (1979)

Crazy Horse chronology
Crazy Moon (1978)	Rust Never Sleeps (1979)	Live Rust (1979)

Singles from Rust Never Sleeps
- 1. "Hey Hey, My My (Into the Black)" / "My My, Hey Hey (Out of the Blue)" Released: August 27, 1979

Rust Never Sleeps is the tenth album by Canadian American singer-songwriter Neil Young and his third with American band Crazy Horse. It was released on June 22, 1979, by Reprise Records and features both studio and live tracks. Most of the album was recorded live, then overdubbed in the studio, while other songs originated in the studio. Young used the phrase "rust never sleeps" as a concept for his tour with Crazy Horse to avoid artistic complacency and try more progressive, theatrical approaches to performing live.

The album peaked at No. 8 on the Billboard 200 album chart and spawned the hit single "Hey Hey, My My (Into the Black)" that peaked at No. 79 on the US Billboard Hot 100 chart. It also included one of Young's most popular and critically acclaimed songs, the enigmatic "Powderfinger". The album, along with Young's 1990 release Ragged Glory, has widely been considered a precursor of grunge music with the bands Nirvana and Pearl Jam having cited Young's heavily distorted and abrasive guitar style on the B side of the album as an inspiration.

== Background ==
The album was recorded in May 1978 during solo acoustic performances at The Boarding House in San Francisco and in October 1978 during the "Rust Never Sleeps" tour, in which Young played a wealth of new material. The concert tour was divided into a solo acoustic set and an electric set with Crazy Horse. Two new songs, the acoustic "My My, Hey Hey (Out of the Blue)" and electric "Hey Hey, My My (Into the Black)" were the centerpiece of the new material. The overdubbed live tracks are complemented with two outtakes from Young's previous album, Comes a Time.

== Writing ==
The album sees Young reunited with Crazy Horse, his first credited to the band since 1975's Zuma. Four of the album's eight songs date from the sessions from that previous album: "Pocahontas", "Ride My Llama", "Powderfinger" and "Sedan Delivery". Studio attempts at each of these songs from the summer of 1975 have since been released through Young's Archives series. Young explains in his memoir, Waging Heavy Peace: "The album Zuma is the first album we made with Crazy Horse after Poncho joined the band. We kept playing day after day and partying at night. We did the original "Powderfinger" and held it back. We did "Sedan Delivery" and held it back. "Ride My Llama" was completely finished and mixed and held back. Today I like listening to all of those tracks together in a compilation I call Dume that is in The Archives Volume 2."

The album's title, Rust Never Sleeps, takes its name from the song that bookends the album, titled "My My, Hey Hey (Out of the Blue)" and "Hey Hey, My My (Into the Black)". The line "It's better to burn out than it is to rust" was borrowed from a line in a song by Jeff Blackburn, Young's bandmate in The Ducks, with whom he toured in 1977. Devo vocalist Mark Mothersbaugh added the lyrics "Rust never sleeps", a slogan he remembered from his graphic arts career promoting the automobile rust proofing product Rust-Oleum. Young recalls in a 1981 Rockline interview:

I think Mark had the idea in the first place. We were doing this version of "Out of the Blue" together and we were in the studio playing and Booji Boy was there and he was singing "Hey Hey, My My" and he just had a lyric sheet and it said "It's better to burn out than to rust" and he just said 'Well it's better to burn out 'cause rust never sleeps" and I thought, well all right, that makes a lot of sense to me.

Young adopted Mothersbaugh's lyrics and created a new version of the song with Crazy Horse. He also adopted Mothersbaugh's lyrics for the title of his album as a metaphor about the hazards of complacency on his music career and the need to keep moving forward. Young explained in a June 1988 interview for Spin Magazine how the lyrics resonated with him, and how he felt both the record industry should be shaken up at the time, and how he applies the sentiment of the song to his style of recording:

I never met Johnny Rotten, but I like what he did to people. He pissed off a lot of people who I think needed waking up. Rock 'n' roll people, who in the Seventies were asleep and thinking they were just so fucking cool and they knew what had to happen. They were telling me why don't you make a real record. People became aware that there was more to it than perfection and overdubs, and fucking equipment and limousines back and forth to Studio B, and the other group down the hall and getting high in the bathroom with the other group that's going in and singing on their record. That's not intense enough for me. I think art is a private thing. I'm not sharing my creative moment with whoever's in the hallway. Rust implies you're not using anything, that you're sitting there and letting the elements eat you. Burning up means you're cruising through the elements so fucking fast that you're actually burning, and your circuits, instead of corroding, are fucking disintegrating. You're going so fast you're actually fucking the elements, becoming one with the elements, turning to gas. That's why it's better to burn out.

The lyrics, "It's better to burn out than fade away", were widely quoted by his peers and by critics. In a 1980 interview with David Sheff from Playboy magazine, John Lennon was dismissive of the lyric and the song's reference to Johnny Rotten for what he interpreted as worship for the dead saying, "No, thank you. I'll take the living and the healthy." In 1994, Kurt Cobain quoted the lyric in his suicide note. After Cobain's death, Young vowed never to perform the song again, but reversed his stance at the request of the surviving members of Nirvana.

"Thrasher" was written while filming Human Highway in New Mexico with Dennis Hopper. Young remembers in a 2022 post to his website: "After leaving Taos with Carpio, a Native American friend I had met during the filming of Human Highway, sitting in the front seat of his car, I wrote this song, "Thrasher". Driving through the magnificent beauty of New Mexico, the words just kept coming to me. I saw the eagles circling, the deep canyons, the road ahead, reflecting on my journey through recent years, and thankful to be where I was."

In the song's lyrics, he uncharitably describes his CSNY bandmates as "dead weight". Young explains in a 1985 interview: "Well, at that point I felt like it was kind of dead weight for me. Not for them. For me. I could go somewhere and they couldn't go there. I wasn't going to pull them along, they were doing fine without me. It might have come off a little more harsh than I meant it, but once I write I can't say, 'Oh, I'm going to hurt someone's feelings.' Poetically and on feeling it made good sense to me and it came right out. I think I'd be doing a disservice to change it based on what I think a reaction would be. I try not to do that."

Young chose not to perform the song for several years after its initial release, due to his reaction to a particularly harsh review of the song. He would tell a 2014 audience "This song, you know, I did it, I haven't done it that much in my life because at a very vulnerable moment I read something about it. Just like the worst fucking review I've ever read. So for all your reviewers, if you feel like your words don't mean anything, you're probably right, but in that case, in that case they were damaging. So, anyway, I think I got this, I think this it's the one here. I hope so."

"Ride My Llama" tells a tale of space travel and playing guitars with an alien. When introducing the song at The Boarding House, Young described it as "an extraterrestrial folk song" about "close encounters of the finest kind". He further shares that he wrote the song the same day as "Cortez the Killer". Young and Crazy Horse would first record "Cortez the Killer", "Ride My Llama" and "Sedan Delivery" on the same day at the beginning of the Zuma sessions.

"Pocahontas" was written at the home of CSNY road manager and video producer Taylor Phelps "one night when I was just sitting around on one of my friend's farms out there. We were getting high sitting there in front of that old pot belly, thinking about what it could've been like. I turned over and said, 'Wow, I wish I had my 12-string with me right now'." The song was written "just after Marlon Brando received his Academy Award and didn't accept it. And sent an Indian girl to receive the award and make a few comments."

"Sail Away" was first performed live in 1977 with The Ducks. Referring to the song, Young shares on his website in 2018 that "When i think about the road, I always see those long strips of blacktop cutting through immense valleys."

"Powderfinger" took several years to write. When Young first played the song live at The Boarding House, he claimed he still didn't know it well. Young explains its evolution in a 1993 interview: "It's a unique thing when you start a song at one point and finish it years later. Something happens. You get an original idea and get it going, and something stops you. It could be anything--some distraction that happens and takes your mind away from it. You could be trying too hard. These things happen, and you don't finish the song. "Powderfinger" took a long time. I wrote the first line in 1967 and didn't finish the song until 1975. It was funny to pick up where I left off. Something blocks me once in awhile, and I don't try to force anything to an unnatural end. I just put it away and maybe come back to it later."

Young would offer the song to Lynyrd Skynyrd for one of their albums, but members of the group died before it could be recorded. Cameron Crowe remembers in a post to his blog, The Uncool:

Neil Young gave a tape to Joel Bernstein to give to me which I gave to Ronnie [Van Zant], that had three songs on it—"Captain Kennedy," "Sedan Delivery," and "Powderfinger"—before they'd come out. And he wanted to give them to Lynyrd Skynyrd if they wanted to do one of his songs."

"Sedan Delivery" appears with a faster tempo and with one less verse than its studio performance from the Zuma sessions that surfaced on Chrome Dreams. In a 1995 interview with Nick Kent for Mojo magazine, Young denies any influence of UK punk rock on the album: "I wasn't really influenced by that scene. Most of the songs on that album had been written well before the Sex Pistols were ever heard of." Instead, in a 2019 post on his website, he does credit Devo's influence: "This version was inspired by DEVO in attitude, moving a lot faster than the original earliest recording of 'Sedan Delivery'."

== Recording ==
The acoustic portions of the album including, "My My, Hey Hey (Out of the Blue)", "Thrasher" and "Ride My Llama" were recorded live in San Francisco at the Boarding House between May 24 and 28, 1978. Young played ten acoustic sets over five days. Young used the occasion to play several songs in concert for the first time. In addition to the three tracks on the album he also debuted "Powderfinger", "Shots" and "The Ways of Love" and played the rarities "Out of My Mind" and "I Believe in You" on piano. "Shots" would later appear on Re·ac·tor in 1981; "The Ways of Love" would first surface on Freedom in 1989. The concert takes were overdubbed in the studio. For example, Young would later double the guitar part to "Ride My Llama" in the studio.

Two songs from the album were not recorded live: "Pocahontas" had been recorded solo in August 1976 during the Hitchhiker session, with later overdubs in September 1977 at Triiad studios for the album Oceanside/Countryside, an early version of Comes a Time. "Sail Away" was also recorded at Triiad as a solo track, and received full band overdubs during the Comes a Time recording sessions in November 1977.

Following the May 27 performances at The Boarding House, Young joined Devo onstage at the punk club Mabuhay Gardens. The following day, they collaborated on the first electric performance of "Hey Hey, My My (Into the Black)" at Different Fur Studios for the film Human Highway. Young would later push Crazy Horse to match Devo's intensity of performance when recording their version of the song for the album.

The electric sets were recorded during the Neil Young/Crazy Horse tour in October 1978, with overdubs added later. The same performance of "Hey Hey, My My (Into the Black)" is used on both Rust Never Sleeps and Live Rust, with the former receiving significant overdubs. Audience noise is removed from the album as much as possible, although it is clearly audible at certain points, most noticeably on the opening and closing songs.

Young adopted a new look for the concerts, with much shorter hair and wearing a sport coat and bolo tie. The concerts incorporated several visual stunts: ridiculously oversized amplifiers, Star Wars Jawa-inspired "road-eye" characters roaming the stage and 3D "Rust-O-Vision" glasses were given out to the audience. Young would also appear onstage alongside three large wood-carved Indian statues from the set of Human Highway. One of the statues, "Woody", would accompany Young on future tours.

The 1978 tour featured an abrasive style of guitar playing influenced by the punk rock zeitgeist of the late 1970s that Young saw as a wake up call for a rock music world which, in his opinion had become predictable and overdone. The electric sets provided a reenergized response to the punk rock revolution and, were in stark contrast from Young's previous, folk-inspired album Comes a Time.

== Concert film ==
Neil Young filmed, on October 22, 1978, at Cow Palace, San Francisco, a concert, distributed to theaters two months after the album, by International Harmony, one of Rolling Stone Australia 70 Greatest Music Documentaries of All Time.

== Critical reception ==
Retrospective professional reviews
Review scores
Source	Rating
AllMusic	5/5 stars
Chicago Tribune	4/4 stars
Christgau's Record Guide	A+
Encyclopedia of Popular Music	5/5 stars
The Great Rock Discography	9/10
MusicHound Rock	4.5/5
Music Story	5/5 stars
Q	4/5 stars
The Rolling Stone Album Guide	5/5 stars
Spin Alternative Record Guide	10/10
Consequence	A

Reviewing for The Village Voice in 1979, Robert Christgau called Rust Never Sleeps Young's best album yet and said although his melodies are unsurprisingly simple and original, his lyrics are surprisingly and offhandedly complex. "He's wiser but not wearier", Christgau wrote, "victor so far over the slow burnout his title warns of".

Paul Nelson, writing in Rolling Stone, found its first side "virtuosic" because of how Young "transcends the songs' acoustic settings with his commanding performance" and was "impressed by its themes of personal escape and exhaustion, the role of rock music, and American violence." Nelson would write that "Rust Never Sleeps tells me more about my life, my country and rock & roll than any music I've heard in years."

Rust Never Sleeps was voted the second best album of 1979 in The Village Voice's annual Pazz & Jop critics poll. Christgau, the poll's creator, ranked it second on his own list for the poll, as did fellow critic Greil Marcus. The album also won Rolling Stone magazine's 1979 critics poll for Album of the Year. In a decade-end list for The Village Voice, Christgau named it the ninth best album of the 1970s.

In 2000, Rust Never Sleeps was voted number 240 in the third edition of Colin Larkin's All Time Top 1000 Albums book. In 2003, it was ranked number 350 on Rolling Stone magazine's list of the 500 greatest albums of all time. Rolling Stone re-ranked the album at 351 in the list's 2012 edition, and later at number 296 in the 2020 edition. In a retrospective review, Greg Kot of the Chicago Tribune said that the acoustic and electric sides were both "astounding". AllMusic's William Ruhlmann viewed that "Young reinvigorated himself artistically by being imaginative and bold, and in the process created an exemplary album that encapsulated his many styles on a single disc with great songs—in particular the remarkable 'Powderfinger'—unlike any he had written before." Rob Sheffield, writing in The Rolling Stone Album Guide (2004), felt that "Powderfinger", "Pocahontas", "Thrasher", and "Hey Hey, My My (Into the Black)" were among Young's greatest songs.

== Track listing ==
All tracks written by Neil Young except where noted.

Side one
No.	Title	Writer(s)	Length
1.	"My My, Hey Hey (Out of the Blue)"	Neil Young, Jeff Blackburn	3:45
2.	"Thrasher"		5:38
3.	"Ride My Llama"		2:29
4.	"Pocahontas"		3:22
5.	"Sail Away"		3:46

Side two
No.	Title	Length
6.	"Powderfinger"	5:30
7.	"Welfare Mothers"	3:48
8.	"Sedan Delivery"	4:40
9.	"Hey Hey, My My (Into the Black)"	5:18

== Personnel ==
- Neil Young – vocals, guitars, harmonica, organ, percussion, production

with (on "Sail Away"):

- Nicolette Larson – vocals
- Joe Osborn – bass
- Karl T. Himmel – drums

Crazy Horse (on side two)

- Frank "Poncho" Sampedro – electric guitar, backing vocals
- Billy Talbot – bass, backing vocals
- Ralph Molina – drums, backing vocals

Additional roles

- David Briggs, Tim Mulligan – production

== Charts ==
Chart performance for Rust Never Sleeps
Chart (1979–1980)	Peak position
Australia (Kent Music Report)	8
US Billboard Top LPs & Tape	8
UK Album Charts	13
Canadian RPM 100 Albums	28
Dutch Album Charts	19
German Album Charts	59
Finnish Album Charts	9
New Zealand Album Charts	7
Swedish Albums (Sverigetopplistan)	9
US Cash Box Top 100 Albums	9
US Record World Album Chart	13

Singles

Year	Single	Chart	Position
1979	"Hey Hey, My My (Into the Black)"	Billboard Pop Singles	79
1979	"Hey Hey, My My (Into the Black)"	US Cashbox Singles	94
1979	"Hey Hey, My My (Into the Black)"	US Record World Singles	72

Year End Chart

Year	Chart	Position
1980	Billboard Year End Chart	78
1979	Cashbox Year End Chart	43

== Certifications ==
Region	Certification	Certified units/sales
Australia (ARIA)	Gold	7,500^{^}
United Kingdom (BPI)	Silver	60,000^{^}
United States (RIAA)	Platinum	1,000,000^{^}
^{^} Shipments figures based on certification alone.

== Sources ==
- McDonough, Jimmy (2002). Shakey: Neil Young's Biography. New York City, NY: Random House. ISBN 978-0-679-42772-8. OCLC 47844513.
