= My My, Hey Hey (Out of the Blue) =

1979 song by Canadian musician Neil Young

- One of flip sides of a Dutch single pressing

Single by Neil Young and Crazy Horse

from the album Rust Never Sleeps
- A-side: "Hey Hey, My My (Into the Black)"
- Released: August 27, 1979
- Recorded: May 26, 1978
- Venue: Boarding House, San Francisco, California
- Genre: Acoustic rock
- Length: 3:45
- Label: Reprise
- Songwriters: Neil Young; Jeff Blackburn
- Producers: Neil Young; David Briggs; Tim Mulligan

Neil Young and Crazy Horse singles chronology
"Four Strong Winds" (1978)	"My My, Hey Hey (Out of the Blue)" (1979)	"The Loner (Live)" (1980)

"My My, Hey Hey (Out of the Blue)" is a song by Canadian musician Neil Young. An acoustic song, it was recorded live in early 1978 at the Boarding House in San Francisco, California. Combined with its hard rock counterpart "Hey Hey, My My (Into the Black)", it bookends Young's 1979 album Rust Never Sleeps. Inspired by electropunk group Devo, the rise of punk and what Young viewed as his own growing irrelevance, the song significantly revitalized Young's career.

The line "it's better to burn out than to fade away" was taken from one of the songs of Young's bandmate in the short-lived supergroup The Ducks, Jeff Blackburn. It became infamous after being quoted in Nirvana frontman Kurt Cobain's suicide note. Young later said that he was so shaken that he dedicated his 1994 album Sleeps with Angels to Cobain.

== Personnel ==
- Neil Young – guitar, harmonica, vocals

== Legacy ==
Young compared the rise of Johnny Rotten with that of the recently deceased "King" Elvis Presley, who himself had once been disparaged as a dangerous influence only to later become an icon.

The song is included on Neil Young's Greatest Hits album.

The title of the Dennis Hopper movie Out of the Blue is taken from, and features, the song.

Kurt Cobain's suicide note ended with the same line, shaking Young and inadvertently cementing his place as the so-called "Godfather of Grunge".

John Lennon commented on the message of the song in a 1980 interview with David Sheff of Playboy:

Sheff: You disagree with Neil Young's lyric in Rust Never Sleeps: "It's better to burn out than to fade away..."

Lennon: I hate it. It's better to fade away like an old soldier than to burn out. If he was talking about burning out like Sid Vicious, forget it. I don't appreciate the worship of dead Sid Vicious or of dead James Dean or dead John Wayne. It's the same thing. Making Sid Vicious a hero, Jim Morrison — it's garbage to me. I worship the people who survive — Gloria Swanson, Greta Garbo. They're saying John Wayne conquered cancer — he whipped it like a man. You know, I'm sorry that he died and all that — I'm sorry for his family — but he didn't whip cancer. It whipped him. I don't want Sean worshiping John Wayne or Johnny Rotten or Sid Vicious. What do they teach you? Nothing. Death. Sid Vicious died for what? So that we might rock? I mean, it's garbage you know. If Neil Young admires that sentiment so much, why doesn't he do it? Because he sure as hell faded away and came back many times, like all of us. No, thank you. I'll take the living and the healthy.

Young, when asked to respond to Lennon's comments two years later, replied:

The rock'n'roll spirit is not survival. Of course the people who play rock'n'roll should survive. But the essence of the rock'n'roll spirit to me, is that it's better to burn out really bright than to sort of decay off into infinity. Even though if you look at it in a mature way, you'll think, "well, yes... you should decay off into infinity, and keep going along". Rock'n'roll doesn't look that far ahead. Rock'n'roll is right now. What's happening right this second. Is it bright? Or is it dim because it's waiting for tomorrow—that's what people want to know. And that's why I say that.

== Certifications ==
Region	Certification	Certified units/sales
New Zealand (RMNZ)	Platinum	30,000^{‡}
^{‡} Sales+streaming figures based on certification alone.
