= What's That Sound? Complete Albums Collection =

Box set by Buffalo Springfield
- Released: 29 June 2018
- Recorded: June 1966 – April 1968
- Genres: Folk rock, rock and roll, country rock
- Length: 2:50:08
- Label: Rhino

Buffalo Springfield chronology
Buffalo Springfield (2001)	What's That Sound? Complete Albums Collection (2018)

What's That Sound? Complete Albums Collection is a box set of albums by the American rock band Buffalo Springfield. Released by Rhino Records in June 2018, the set contains the three original albums officially released by Atco—mono and stereo versions of the first two albums, Buffalo Springfield and Buffalo Springfield Again, and the stereo version of the last album, Last Time Around.

== Track listing ==
=== Disc One: Buffalo Springfield (Mono Version) ===
1. "Go and Say Goodbye"
2. "Sit Down I Think I Love You"
3. "Leave"
4. "Nowadays Clancy Can't Even Sing"
5. "Hot Dusty Roads"
6. "Everybody's Wrong"
7. "Flying on the Ground Is Wrong"
8. "Burned"
9. "Do I Have to Come Right Out and Say It"
10. "Baby Don't Scold Me"
11. "Out of My Mind"
12. "Pay the Price"
13. "For What It's Worth"

=== Disc Two: Buffalo Springfield (Stereo Version) ===
1. "For What It's Worth"
2. "Go and Say Goodbye"
3. "Sit Down I Think I Love You"
4. "Nowadays Clancy Can't Even Sing"
5. "Hot Dusty Roads"
6. "Everybody's Wrong"
7. "Flying on the Ground Is Wrong"
8. "Burned"
9. "Do I Have to Come Right Out and Say It"
10. "Leave"
11. "Out of My Mind"
12. "Pay the Price"

=== Disc Three: Buffalo Springfield Again (Mono Version) ===
1. "Mr. Soul"
2. "A Child's Claim to Fame"
3. "Everydays"
4. "Expecting to Fly"
5. "Bluebird"
6. "Hung Upside Down"
7. "Sad Memory"
8. "Good Time Boy"
9. "Rock & Roll Woman"
10. "Broken Arrow"

=== Disc Four: Buffalo Springfield Again (Stereo Version) ===
1. "Mr. Soul"
2. "A Child's Claim to Fame"
3. "Everydays"
4. "Expecting to Fly"
5. "Bluebird"
6. "Hung Upside Down"
7. "Sad Memory"
8. "Good Time Boy"
9. "Rock & Roll Woman"
10. "Broken Arrow"

=== Disc Five: Last Time Around (Stereo Version) ===
1. "On The Way Home"
2. "It's So Hard to Wait"
3. "Pretty Girl Why"
4. "Four Days Gone"
5. "Carefree Country Day"
6. "Special Care"
7. "The Hour of Not Quite Rain"
8. "Questions"
9. "I Am a Child"
10. "Merry-Go-Round"
11. "Uno Mundo"
12. "Kind Woman"

== Personnel ==
Buffalo Springfield:

- Richie Furay – Guitar, Vocals, Vocals (background), Producer
- Dewey Martin – Clarinet, Drums, Horn, Saxophone, Vocals, Executive Producer
- Jim Messina – Bass, Producer, Engineer
- Bruce Palmer – Bass
- Stephen Stills – Organ, Bass, Guitar, Percussion, Piano, Piano (Electric), Tambourine, Vocals, Vocals (background), Handclapping, Producer, Remixing
- Neil Young – Guitar, Harmonica, Piano, Arranger, Vocals, Vocals (background), Producer, Remixing

Others:

- Joel Bernstein – Artwork, Compilation, Photography, Research, Text
- Hal Blaine – Drums
- Don Blake – Mixing
- Bruce Botnick – Engineer
- William E Brittan – Engineer
- Gary Burden – Art Direction, Design
- James Burton – Dobro
- Jimmy Karstein – Drums
- Charlie Chin – Banjo
- Merry Clayton – Choir, Chorus
- David Crosby – Backing Vocal on "Rock & Roll Woman"
- Richard Davis – Bass
- Ahmet Ertegun – Producer
- Cyrus Faryar – Percussion
- Jim Fielder – Bass
- James Gordon – Strings, Horn (English)
- Jim Gordon – Drums, Tympani [Timpani], Vibraphone
- Charles Greene – Producer
- Doug Hastings – Guitar
- Jessie Hill – Drums, Tympani [Timpani]
- Jim Hilton – Engineer
- Brenda Holloway – Choir, Chorus
- Patrice Holloway – Choir, Chorus
- Jim Horn – Clarinet
- Carol Kaye – Banjo, Bass, Dobro, Fiddle, Piano, Strings, Drums, Horn, Vibraphone
- Bill Lazarus – Engineer
- Gary Marker – Bass
- Sherlie Matthews – Choir, Chorus
- Tom May – Engineer
- Buddy Miles – Drums
- Tim Mulligan – Remixing
- Harvey Newmark – Bass
- Gracia Nitzsche – Choir, Chorus
- Jack Nitzsche – Arranger, Piano (Electric), Producer
- Don Randi – Organ, Piano, Harpsichord
- Mac Rebennack – Piano
- Stan Ross – Engineer
- Doc Siegel – Engineer
- Armin Steiner – Engineer
- Brian Stone – Producer
- Jeromy Stuart – Calliope, Harpsichord, Bells
- Bruce Tergesen – Engineer
- Russ Titelman – Guitar
- Bobby West – Bass
- Rusty Young – Pedal Steel
