= Buffalo Springfield (box set) =

Box set by Buffalo Springfield
- Released: July 17, 2001
- Recorded: June 1966 – April 1968
- Genres: Folk rock, rock and roll, country rock
- Length: 243:30
- Label: Rhino

Buffalo Springfield chronology
Buffalo Springfield (1973)	Buffalo Springfield (2001)	What's That Sound? Complete Albums Collection (2018)

Professional ratings
Review scores
Source	Rating
AllMusic link	4.5/5 stars
Encyclopedia of Popular Music	5/5 stars

Buffalo Springfield is a career retrospective album by the 1960s folk rock band of the same name, released in 2001. Band member Neil Young assembled the tracks in chronological order to show how the band evolved and disintegrated in the span of two years, as encompassed through the first three CDs, while the fourth disc contains the band's first two albums, all but three tracks of which had already appeared in identical versions elsewhere on the first three discs. The box set reached number 194 on Billboard's Top 200 album chart, and stayed on the chart for one week.

Although meant as a comprehensive overview of the band's entire career, the box set misses several items including the tracks "In The Hour of Not Quite Rain", "Carefree Country Day" and the released version of "Four Days Gone" from Last Time Around, several known outtakes including "Sell Out" (later included on Young's The Archives Vol. 1 1963-1972), "Whiskey Boot Hill" and "Looks Like You Made It", the nine-minute version of "Bluebird" included on the band's 1973 compilation and any live audio. Young claimed that the sound quality was too poor in the surviving live tapes for inclusion, although he would later include a montage of excerpts from the band's final May 5, 1968 concert in The Archives Vol. 1 1963-1972. Finally, only the mono version of the debut album and the stereo version of Buffalo Springfield Again appear.

== Track listing ==
CD 1

1. "There Goes My Babe" (Neil Young) – 1:43 (previously unreleased demo)*
2. "Come On" (Stephen Stills) – 1:23 (previously unreleased demo)*
3. "Hello, I've Returned" (Stills, Van Dyke Parks) – 1:34 (previously unreleased demo)*
4. "Out of My Mind" (Young) – 2:44 (previously unreleased demo)*
5. "Flying on the Ground Is Wrong" (Young) – 3:08 (previously unreleased demo)*
6. "I'm Your Kind of Guy" (Young) – 1:05 (previously unreleased demo)*
7. "Baby Don't Scold Me" (Stills) – 2:04 (previously unreleased demo)*
8. "Neighbor Don't You Worry" (Stills) – 2:28 (previously unreleased demo)*
9. "We'll See" (Stills) – 4:07 (previously unreleased demo)*
10. "Sad Memory" (Richie Furay) – 2:49 (previously unreleased demo)*
11. "Can't Keep Me Down" (Furay) – 2:07 (previously unreleased demo)*
12. "Nowadays Clancy Can't Even Sing" (Young) – 3:25
13. "Go and Say Goodbye" (Stills) – 2:21
14. "Sit Down, I Think I Love You" (Stills) – 2:31
15. "Leave" (Stills) – 2:43
16. "Hot Dusty Roads" (Stills) – 2:51
17. "Everybody's Wrong" (Stills) – 2:24
18. "Burned" (Young) – 2:16
19. "Do I Have to Come Right Out and Say It" (Young) – 3:02
20. "Out of My Mind" (Young) – 3:05
21. "Pay the Price" (Stills) – 2:37
22. "Down Down Down" (Young) – 2:11 (previously unreleased demo)*
23. "Flying on the Ground Is Wrong" (Young) – 2:40
24. "Neighbor Don't You Worry" (Stills) – 2:25 (previously unreleased remix)*

CD 2

1. "Down Down Down" (Young) – 2:42 (previously unreleased remix)*
2. "Kahuna Sunset" (Stills, Young) – 2:53 (previously unreleased)*
3. "Buffalo Stomp (Raga)" (Furay, Bruce Kunkel, Dewey Martin, Stills, Young) – 3:51 (previously unreleased)*
4. "Baby Don't Scold Me" (Stills) – 3:24 (previously unreleased version)*
5. "For What It's Worth" (Stills) – 2:39 (previously unreleased version)*
6. "Mr. Soul" (Young) – 2:44 (previously unreleased version)*
7. "We'll See" (Stills) – 2:43 (previously unreleased)*
8. "My Kind of Love" (Furay) – 2:31 (previously unreleased)*
9. "Pretty Girl Why" (Stills) – 2:26 (previously unreleased mix)*
10. "Words I Must Say" (Furay) – 1:12 (previously unreleased demo)*
11. "Nobody's Fool" (Furay) – 1:31 (previously unreleased demo)*
12. "So You've Got a Lover" (Stills) – 3:06 (previously unreleased demo)*
13. "My Angel" (Stills) – 3:48 (Demo)*
14. "No Sun Today" (Eric Eisner) – 2:02 (previously unreleased)*
15. "Everydays" (Stills) – 2:40
16. "Down to the Wire" (Young) – 2:25 (previously unreleased version)*
17. "Bluebird" (Stills) – 4:29
18. "Expecting to Fly" (Young) – 3:45
19. "Hung Upside Down" (Stills) – 4:26 (previously unreleased demo)*
20. "A Child's Claim to Fame" (Furay) – 2:10
21. "Rock & Roll Woman" (Stills) – 2:46

CD 3

1. "Hung Upside Down" (Stills) – 3:27
2. "Good Time Boy" (Furay) – 2:15
3. "One More Sign" (Young) – 2:02 (previously unreleased demo)*
4. "The Rent Is Always Due" (Young) – 3:03 (previously unreleased demo)*
5. "Round and Round and Round" (Young) – 3:37 (previously unreleased demo)*
6. "Old Laughing Lady" (Young) – 2:40 (previously unreleased demo)*
7. "Broken Arrow" (Young) – 6:14
8. "Sad Memory" (Furay) – 3:01
9. "On the Way Home" (Young) – 2:27 (previously unreleased mix)*
10. "Whatever Happened to Saturday Night" (Young) – 2:06 (previously unreleased/remix)*
11. "Special Care" (Stills) – 3:32
12. "Falcon Lake (Ash on the Floor)" (Young) – 4:19 (previously unreleased/remix)*
13. "What a Day" (Furay) – 2:18 (previously unreleased)*
14. "I Am a Child" (Young) – 2:20
15. "Questions" (Stills) – 2:54
16. "Merry-Go-Round" (Furay) – 2:02
17. "Uno Mundo" (Stills) – 2:00
18. "Kind Woman" (Furay) – 4:12
19. "It's So Hard to Wait" (Furay, Young) – 2:05
20. "Four Days Gone" (Stills) – 3:47 (previously unreleased demo)*

CD 4

1. "For What It's Worth" (Stills) – 2:39
2. "Go and Say Goodbye" (Stills) – 2:21 (already on CD1, tk13)
3. "Sit Down, I Think I Love You" (Stills) – 2:32 (already on CD1, tk14)
4. "Nowadays Clancy Can't Even Sing" (Young) – 3:25 (already on CD1, tk12)
5. "Hot Dusty Roads" (Stills) – 2:50 (already on CD1, tk16)
6. "Everybody's Wrong" (Stills) – 2:24 (already on CD1, tk17)
7. "Flying on the Ground Is Wrong" (Young) – 2:40 (already on CD1, tk23)
8. "Burned" (Young) – 2:16 (already on CD1, tk18)
9. "Do I Have to Come Right Out and Say It" (Young) – 3:02 (already on CD1, tk19)
10. "Leave" (Stills) – 2:43 (already on CD1, tk15)
11. "Out of My Mind" (Young) – 3:05 (already on CD1, tk20)
12. "Pay the Price" (Stills) – 2:36 (already on CD1, tk21)
13. "Baby Don't Scold Me" (Stills) – 3:04
14. "Mr. Soul" (Young) – 2:49
15. "A Child's Claim to Fame" (Furay) – 2:10 (already on CD2, tk20)
16. "Everydays" (Stills) – 2:40 (already on CD2, tk15)
17. "Expecting to Fly" (Young) – 3:44 (already on CD2, tk18)
18. "Bluebird" (Stills) – 2:16 (already on CD2, tk17)
19. "Hung Upside Down" (Stills) – 3:27 (already on CD3, tk1)
20. "Sad Memory" (Furay) – 3:01 (already on CD3, tk8)
21. "Good Time Boy" (Furay) – 2:15 (already on CD3, tk2)
22. "Rock & Roll Woman" (Stills) – 2:46 (already on CD2, tk21)
23. "Broken Arrow" (Young) – 6:14 (already on CD3, tk7)

== Personnel ==
Buffalo Springfield:

- Richie Furay – guitar, vocals, backing vocals, producer
- Dewey Martin – clarinet, drums, horn, saxophone, vocals, executive producer
- Jim Messina – bass, producer, engineer
- Bruce Palmer – bass
- Stephen Stills – organ, bass, guitar, percussion, piano, electric piano, tambourine, vocals, backing vocals, hand clapping, producer, remixing
- Neil Young – guitar, harmonica, piano, arranger, vocals, backing vocals, producer, remixing

Others:

- Joel Bernstein – artwork, compilation, photography, research, text
- Hal Blaine – drums
- Don Blake – mixing
- Bruce Botnick – engineer
- William E. Brittan – engineer
- Gary Burden – art direction, design
- James Burton – dobro
- Jimmy Karstein – drums
- Charlie Chin – banjo
- Merry Clayton – choir, chorus
- David Crosby – backing vocal on "Rock & Roll Woman"
- Richard Davis – bass
- Ahmet Ertegun – producer
- Cyrus Faryar – percussion
- Jim Fielder – bass
- James Gordon – strings, English horn
- Jim Gordon – drums, timpani, vibraphone
- Charles Greene – producer
- Doug Hastings – guitar
- Jessie Hill – drums, timpani
- Jim Hilton – engineer
- Brenda Holloway – choir, chorus
- Patrice Holloway – choir, chorus
- Jim Horn – clarinet
- Carol Kaye – banjo, bass, dobro, fiddle, piano, strings, drums, horn, vibraphone
- Bill Lazarus – engineer
- Gary Marker – bass
- Sherlie Matthews – choir, chorus
- Tom May – engineer
- Buddy Miles – drums
- Tim Mulligan – remixing
- Harvey Newmark – bass
- Gracia Nitzsche – choir, chorus
- Jack Nitzsche – arranger, electric piano, producer
- Don Randi – organ, piano, harpsichord
- Mac Rebennack – piano
- Stan Ross – engineer
- Doc Siegel – engineer
- Armin Steiner – engineer
- Brian Stone – producer
- Jeromy Stuart – calliope, harpsichord, bells
- Bruce Tergesen – engineer
- Russ Titelman – guitar
- Bobby West – bass
- Rusty Young – pedal steel
