= Buffalo Springfield (disambiguation) =

Buffalo Springfield was an American band.

Buffalo Springfield may also refer to:

- Buffalo Springfield (album), 1966 studio album by the band
- Buffalo Springfield (box set), 2001 box set by the band
- Buffalo Springfield (compilation album), 1973 compilation album by the band

== See also ==
- Buffalo Springfield Again, 1967 studio album by the band
- Buffalo-Springfield Roller Company, American manufacturer of road construction equipment
