= Buffalo Springfield (compilation album) =

Compilation album by Buffalo Springfield
- Released: November 12, 1973
- Recorded: July 1966–April 1968
- Genre: Folk rock, rock
- Length: 74:33
- Label: Atco
- Producer: Buffalo Springfield, Ahmet Ertegun, Jack Nitzsche

Buffalo Springfield chronology
Retrospective: The Best of Buffalo Springfield (1969)	Buffalo Springfield (1973)	Buffalo Springfield (2001)

Professional ratings
Review scores
Source	Rating
AllMusic	4.5/5 stars
Encyclopedia of Popular Music	4/5 stars

Buffalo Springfield is a compilation album released on Atco Records in 1973. It is the fifth album by rock band Buffalo Springfield, and their second compilation. It was assembled by the label well after the band had broken up at a time when Crosby, Stills, Nash & Young were quite popular and had not released any new material as a group for over two years, with their 1974 reunion tour eight months away. It features a nine-minute extended version of the song "Bluebird" by Stephen Stills (consisting of a live jam appended to the studio version), only available elsewhere on the Warner Special Products LP compilation "Heavy Metal – 24 Electrifying Performances" (Volume 2 in the "Superstars of the 70's" series), released in 1974. It has never been issued on compact disc and is currently out of print.

== Track listing ==
Side one
No.	Title	Writer(s)	Length
1.	"For What It's Worth" (running time listed as 3:00 on the label)	Stephen Stills	2:37
2.	"Sit Down, I Think I Love You"	Stephen Stills	2:30
3.	"Nowadays Clancy Can't Even Sing"	Neil Young	3:26
4.	"Go and Say Goodbye"	Stephen Stills	2:19
5.	"Pay the Price"	Stephen Stills	2:35
6.	"Burned"	Neil Young	2:14
7.	"Out of My Mind"	Neil Young	3:05

Side two
No.	Title	Writer(s)	Length
1.	"Mr. Soul"	Neil Young	2:35
2.	"Bluebird" (extended version)	Stephen Stills	9:00
3.	"Broken Arrow"	Neil Young	6:13
4.	"Rock and Roll Woman"	Stephen Stills	2:44

Side three
No.	Title	Writer(s)	Length
1.	"Expecting to Fly"	Neil Young	3:29
2.	"Hung Upside Down"	Stephen Stills	3:24
3.	"A Child's Claim to Fame"	Richie Furay	2:09
4.	"Kind Woman"	Richie Furay	4:10
5.	"On the Way Home"	Neil Young	2:25
6.	"I Am a Child"	Neil Young	2:15

Side four
No.	Title	Writer(s)	Length
1.	"Pretty Girl Why"	Stephen Stills	2:24
2.	"Special Care"	Stephen Stills	3:30
3.	"Uno Mundo"	Stephen Stills	2:00
4.	"In the Hour of Not Quite Rain"	Micki Callen, Richie Furay	3:45
5.	"Four Days Gone"	Stephen Stills	2:53
6.	"Questions"	Stephen Stills	2:52

== Personnel ==
=== Musicians ===
- Stephen Stills – vocals, guitars, keyboards, percussion
- Neil Young – vocals, guitars, keyboards
- Richie Furay – vocals, guitars
- Bruce Palmer, Jim Messina – bass
- Dewey Martin – drums

=== Additional personnel ===
- Charlie Chin – banjo on "Bluebird"
- Bobby West – bass on "Bluebird"
- Don Randi – piano on "Broken Arrow"
- Chris Sarns – guitar on "Broken Arrow"
- David Crosby – vocal allegedly on "Rock and Roll Woman"
- Doug Hastings – guitar on "Rock and Roll Woman"
- Jack Nitzsche —musical arrangement on "Expecting to Fly"
- James Burton – dobro on "A Child's Claim to Fame"
- Richard Davis – bass on "Kind Woman"
- Rusty Young – pedal steel guitar on "Kind Woman"
- Gary Marker – bass on "I Am a Child"
- Buddy Miles – drums on "Special Care"
- Jimmy Karstein – drums on "Questions"

=== Production ===
- Charles Greene, Brian Stone – management and production
- Ahmet Ertegun, Richie Furay, Jim Messina, Jack Nitzsche, Stephen Stills, Neil Young – production

== Charts ==
Chart (1973)	Peak position
Billboard Top LPs & Tape	104
Cashbox Top 100 Albums	69
Record World Album Charts	93
