= Retrospective: The Best of Buffalo Springfield =

Greatest hits album by Buffalo Springfield
- Released: 10 February 1969
- Recorded: July 1966 – April 1968
- Venue: Southern California
- Genre: Folk rock, rock
- Length: 40:23
- Label: Atco
- Producer: Charles Greene, Brian Stone, Stephen Stills, Neil Young, Jack Nitzsche, Jim Messina

Buffalo Springfield chronology
Last Time Around (1968)	Retrospective: The Best of Buffalo Springfield (1969)	Buffalo Springfield (1973)

Retrospective: The Best of Buffalo Springfield is a compilation album by the Canadian-American rock band Buffalo Springfield, released in February 1969 after they disbanded in mid-1968.

Professional ratings
Review scores
Source	Rating
AllMusic	5/5 stars
The Encyclopedia of Popular Music	4/5 stars

== Track listing ==
Side one

1. "For What It's Worth" (Stephen Stills) – 2:34
  - Recorded December 5, 1966, Columbia Studios, Los Angeles, California. Lead vocal: Stephen Stills. Bass: Bruce Palmer. Producers: Charles Green and Brian Stone. Running time incorrectly listed on the album's cover as 3:00.
2. "Mr. Soul" (Neil Young) – 2:53
  - Recorded April 4, 1967. Lead vocal: Neil Young. Bass: Palmer.
3. "Sit Down, I Think I Love You" (Stills) – 2:34
  - Recorded August 1966, Gold Star Studios, Los Angeles, California. Lead vocal: Stills, Richie Furay. Bass: Palmer. Producers: Green and Stone.
4. "Kind Woman" (Richie Furay) – 4:15
  - Recorded February–March 6, 1968, Atlantic Studios, New York City & Sunset Sound, Los Angeles, California. Lead vocal: Furay. Bass: Jim Messina. Producer: Messina.
5. "Bluebird" (Stills) – 4:36
  - Recorded April 8, 1967, Sunset Sound. Lead vocal: Stills. Bass: Bobby West.
6. "On the Way Home" (Young) – 2:30
  - Recorded November 15–December 13, 1967, Sunset Sound. Lead vocal: Furay. Bass: Palmer.

Side two

1. "Nowadays Clancy Can't Even Sing" (Young) – 3:28
  - Recorded July 18, 1966, Gold Star Studios. Lead vocal: Furay. Bass: Palmer. Producers: Green and Stone.
2. "Broken Arrow" (Young) – 6:15
  - Recorded August 25 & September 5–18, 1967, Columbia Recording Studios & Sunset Sound. Lead vocal: Young. Bass: Palmer.
3. "Rock & Roll Woman" (Stills) – 2:46
  - Recorded June 22, August 8 & October 8, 1967, Sunset Sound. Lead vocal: Stills. Rhythm guitar: Jim Fielder. Bass: Palmer.
4. "I Am a Child" (Young) – 2:23
  - Recorded February 5, 1968, Sunset Sound. Lead vocal: Young. Bass: Gary Marker. Producer: Messina.
5. "Go and Say Goodbye" (Stills) – 2:24
  - Recorded July 18, 1966, Gold Star Studios. Lead vocal: Stills. Bass: Palmer. Producers: Green and Stone.
6. "Expecting to Fly" (Young)– 3:45
  - Recorded May 6, 1967, Sunset Sound. Lead vocal: Young. Arrangement: Jack Nitzsche.
    - Young is the only member of the group who appears on this recording.

== Charts ==
Chart (1969)	Peak position
US Billboard 200	42
Cashbox Album Charts	65
Record World Album Charts	58

== Certifications ==
Region	Certification	Certified units/sales
United Kingdom (BPI)	Silver	60,000^{^}
United States (RIAA)	Platinum	1,000,000^{^}
^{^} Shipments figures based on certification alone.
