= Bluebird (Buffalo Springfield song) =

1967 single by Buffalo Springfield

- West German picture sleeve

Single by Buffalo Springfield
- B-side: "Mr. Soul"
- Released: June 15, 1967
- Recorded: April 4, 1967
- Studio: Sunset Sound, Hollywood, California (Note: According to biographer John Einarson, the banjo part played by Charlie Chin was added in New York City, but no date was indicated.)
- Genre: Folk rock; hard rock; psychedelic rock
- Length: 1:59 (single version); 4:28 (album version); 9:00 (extended version)
- Label: Atco
- Songwriter: Stephen Stills
- Producers: Ahmet Ertegun; Stephen Stills

Buffalo Springfield singles chronology
"For What It's Worth" (1966)	"Bluebird" (1967)	"Rock 'n' Roll Woman" (1967)

"Bluebird" is a song recorded by the American rock group Buffalo Springfield. It was written and produced by Stephen Stills, with co-production by Ahmet Ertegun. In June 1967, Atco Records released it as a single to follow-up their hit "For What It's Worth" (1966).

"Bluebird" reflects various influences and musical approaches. Stills conceived of it as a multi-part song, which developed over time. A key feature is the contrasting solos, which alternate between Stills's fingerpicked acoustic and Neil Young's distorted electric guitars. Three different studio versions have been released: a two-minute folk rock single focused on the intro vocal verses; a four and a half minute album version (featured on Buffalo Springfield Again) incorporating hard rock and country elements; and an extended nine-minute jam version, released on the band's self-titled compilation in 1973.

The song was a feature of Buffalo Springfield performances, usually as their closing number. Shortly after its release, they played the song at the Monterey Pop Festival. Improvised live versions of the song could last up to twenty minutes and showed a very different side of the group. After they disbanded, Stills and Young revisited the song several times in studio and live settings.

Although the single reached number 58 on the Billboard chart, some critics see the song as their most accomplished piece. They usually comment on Stills' and Young's guitar interplay and the stylistic shifts undertaken on the different arrangements. The lyrics reveal "a slightly psychedelia-tinged array of emotions and revelations of nature and perception", according to AllMusic critic Matthew Greenwald.

== Background ==
By the end of 1966, Buffalo Springfield was still a relatively new band. Formed in April, their self-titled debut album was released in November 1966. Two singles and the LP had not generated much interest on the record charts and the group's performances were largely confined to the Los Angeles area. A crackdown by police on crowds of young music club goers along the Sunset Strip inspired group singer and guitarist Stephen Stills to write "For What It's Worth". Encouraged by their managers, the song was quickly recorded and released in December 1966. Local radio picked up the single and soon it became Buffalo Springfield's first hit on the charts, eventually reaching number seven on the Billboard Hot 100.

Eager to capitalize on the success of "For What It's Worth", Atco Records was pushing for a follow-up album featuring the song. The label began printing album jackets with the title Stampede, but the group did not have enough songs for a new LP. Instead, Atco reissued their debut album, with Still's song added as the opening track. Meanwhile, Buffalo Springfield began to fracture, with the three main singers and songwriters (Stills, Neil Young, and Richie Furay) each pursuing his own compositions. Young, who wrote the first two Buffalo Springfield singles, was hoping for success with his new rocker, "Mr. Soul". However, with the popularity of "For What It's Worth", Stills was seen as the new voice of the group by some, including Atco. "Bluebird" became Buffalo Springfield's fourth single, with "Mr.Soul" as the B-side. There was always a rivalry between Stills and Young; although the latter contributed the electric lead guitar parts to "Bluebird", he left the group soon after.

== Composition and recording ==
Stills developed "Bluebird" from a song titled "The Ballad of the Bluebird". The lyrics reflect on a melancholy figure:

Listen to my bluebird laugh, she can't tell you why
Deep within her heart, you see, she knows only crying ...
Soon she's going to fly away, sadness is her own
Give herself a bath of tears, and go home, and go home

Music writer Tom Moon describes the song as "Stills's Laurel Canyon meditation", although it does not contain any reference to a place or location. Stills met folk singer Judy Collins at a party in Laurel Canyon later in June 1968, but Crosby, Stills, Nash and Young biographer Peter Doggett sees "Bluebird" as "an ode to the imaginary woman in his Judy Collins fantasy". Collins later became the subject of Stills' "Suite: Judy Blue Eyes". (Note: Both songs contain some similar references: eyes – "You sit there mesmerized, by the depth of her eyes" ("Bluebird") and "Judy blue eyes" ("Suite: Judy Blue Eyes"); birds – "Listen to my bluebird laugh" ("Bluebird") and "Chestnut-brown canary, ruby-throated sparrow" ("Suite"); and flying away – "Soon she going to fly away" ("Bluebird") and "I'm going to fly away" ("Suite").)

"Bluebird" was recorded at Sunset Sound Recorders in Hollywood with Stills, Young, Furay, and drummer Dewey Martin. Original Buffalo Springfield bassist Bruce Palmer had been deported to Canada and, for the session, was replaced by Bobby West. Stills originally approached Jack Nitzsche to produce the song, but Nitzsche declined, citing his involvement with Young. Instead, Stills produced it himself, with Atlantic Records/Atco chief Ahmet Ertegun serving as co-producer. There is only one session date that has been identified, April 4, 1967, although the song required multiple overdubs. (Note: The liner notes to Buffalo Springfield Again credits the guitars to Young, Stills, and Furay, "all 11,386 of 'em".) Stills had recently purchased an acoustic 1937 Martin D-28 and "Bluebird" was the first song he recorded with it. It is also one of the first of his songs to use an alternate guitar tuning, which he referred to as a "D modal" tuning. Stills wanted to maintain an acoustic foundation within a rock setting. So he and audio engineer Bruce Botnick experimented with sound processing, using audio limiter, compressor, and equalizer technology to enhance the acoustic guitar signal so it could compete with the electric guitars, bass, and drums. The result is an unusually bright, upfront sound for a finger-picked acoustic guitar, described as "metallic", "crystal clear", and "absolutely massive".

Stephen's roots music came out in "Bluebird", that Appalachian thing ... That song was so derivative of an old mountain song with the banjo and melody. It was something you didn't hear [in a rock song].

— Chris Hillman, quoted in For What It's Worth: The Story of Buffalo Springfield (2004)

AllMusic critic Matthew Greenwald describes Stills's songwriting process as placing less emphasis on a fixed outcome than on an ongoing exploration of arrangements. A key feature of the song is Stills and Young trading guitar solos, in what Greenwald calls "a vehicle for Stills and Young to weave their intense guitar tapestry around." Ultimately, three different arrangements of the song were released. Although the production chronology is unclear, Doggett places the single version first. At 1:59, it ends shortly after the "Do you think she loves you, Do you think at all" verse, creating a radio-friendly folk-rock tune, made up mostly of vocals. The longer versions include a second section with trade offs between Stills's acoustic and Young's fuzz-toned electric guitar solos. They also feature two very different third sections, after the acoustic guitar drops out.

According to Doggett, Stills prepared a ten-minute "jam" edit "with feral howls, random dialogue and all". Biographer John Einarson describes an extended version "featuring an eastern flavored raga middle electric guitar passage with Stephen and Neil at their most ferocious." However, Stills continued to refine the arrangement; he abandoned the third section jam and replaced it with the vocal coda "Soon she's going to fly away, Sadness is her own" verses over a simple banjo and acoustic guitar accompaniment. Charlie Chin, a musician from Stills' folk music days in New York City's Greenwich Village, performed the bluegrass-style banjo part. Stills later explained, "I wanted it to start as a rock & roll song and slowly develop into what it really is, which it does in the third verse when the banjo comes in. That's the kind of music I started out doing in the Village in little coffee houses". (Note: Guitarist Doug Hastings, who filled in during Neil Young's absence, claims that he suggested to Stills that the song did not benefit from the long ending.) With the second section and the banjo ending, it more than doubled the length of the single version to 4:28.

== Releases and charts ==
Atco issued the two-minute version of "Bluebird" on June 15, 1967, on the then-standard 7-inch 45 rpm record single. Initially, it performed well on area radio, reaching number two on KHJ (AM), a highly ranked Top 40 station. The single entered the U.S. Billboard Hot 100 on July 15, 1967, at number 78 and three weeks later it peaked at number 58. By September 2, "Bluebird" had exited the chart, having spent seven weeks on the Hot 100. With Young's departure and Palmer's recurring immigration problems, the group was already in an uncertain state and "the failure of 'Bluebird' became a turning point for the Springfield", according to Einarson. Richie Furay elaborated:

I was sure that we had the follow-up [to "For What It's Worth"] ... I thought 'Bluebird' was the song that was going to make our mark and take us to the top ... 'Bluebird' was a Top Ten hit in Los Angeles but it couldn't get out of town. But that was always a problem with the band ... Had maybe a hit single appeared, it might have been a different story.

In November 1967, the four and a half minute version was released on the group's second album, Buffalo Springfield Again. It is also included on Retrospective: The Best of Buffalo Springfield (1969), the Buffalo Springfield box set (2001), and What's That Sound? Complete Albums Collection (2018).

In 1967, an extended version, variously identified as being nine, ten, and twelve minutes in length, began to be regularly aired on so-called "underground" FM rock radio. Disc jockey B. Mitchel Reed, at the time involved with the start-up KPPC-FM, discovered a tape of Buffalo Springfield's long version while house-sitting for Stills. Critic Richie Unterberger described it as "an underground airplay hit of sorts", which was officially released in 1973 on the Buffalo Springfield anthology double album. Einarson notes the FM version was released "with slight editing" on the 1973 album (the album version running time is listed at 9:00). Although the 2001 four-CD box set contains many song demos and some alternate versions, Young, who was largely responsible for the track selection, chose not to include the extended version of "Bluebird".

== Critical reception ==
Two weeks after its release, "Bluebird" received brief reviews in American music industry trade magazines. Billboard magazine's "Pop Spotlights" column included: "Following up on their 'For What Its Worth' hit, the West Coast group offers an intriguing folk-rock item that should prove to be a sales giant." Cash Box called it a "winner" and added "spinners and consumers should jump on this easy-paced rocker in quick fashion". A reviewer for Record World described the song as a "hard rhythm number with enough oomph to get to the charts". In an album review of Buffalo Springfield Again in Rolling Stone, "Bluebird" was identified as a highlight of the album. A critic for The New York Times was more effusive: "'Bluebird' is a masterpiece of episodic eclecticism that seems to travel backwards through history ... It starts off like a piece of contemporary west coast rock, and after four and a half minutes of imperceptible mutations, winds up with a back-country banjo solo." Ed Masley of The Arizona Republic described the song as "a psychedelic rocker that makes its way through a constantly shifting landscape."

In a retrospective song review for AllMusic, Matthew Greenwald writes "'Bluebird's sense of forward momentum is, in a word, devastating. Lyrically, it appears to be a slightly psychedelia-tinged array of emotions and revelations of nature and perception." Unterberger commented "Stills's 'Bluebird' might have been a smoky hard rock tune, but the arc of its harmonies and the sparkle of its acoustic guitar runs were folk-fried, and the drumless banjo-led section that ends the track is pure bluegrass ... The rich acoustic-electric guitar textures ... had little parallel in previous rock music in their sheer density." In a separate review of Buffalo Springfield Again, he added "'Bluebird' and 'Rock & Roll Woman' are Stills' toughest rock songs ... masterpieces of economic, intelligent Californian 60s rock."

While Young biographer James McDonough writes of "layers of virtuoso acoustic/electric guitar" and a "meticulously crafted studio creation", he is critical of the extended version: "An overwrought nine-minute version, complete with Stills's moaning-groaning bluesman posturings, mercifully went unreleased until 1973, but it hardly constitutes any kind of real jam—Young's intermittently berserk guitar was overdubbed."

== Live performances ==
Three days after the single release, Buffalo Springfield performed "Bluebird" at the Monterey Pop Festival on June 18, 1967. Young, who had left the group, was replaced by Doug Hastings on guitar. David Crosby of the Byrds also provided back-up on guitar: "Neil left about a week before Monterey, so I rehearsed with them for a few days and I said that I'd sit in with them to cover. I was just trying to help." However, bassist Palmer, who was back in the group, remembered it differently: "He [Crosby] didn't know what he was doing. He didn't rehearse, thought he knew what he was doing, [but] didn't and embarrassed us to the max, and that's why you won't see our segment in [director D. A.] Pennebaker's film Monterey Pop." (Note: The group's performance of their opening number "For What It's Worth" is included on disc three "The Outtake Performances" of The Complete Monterey Pop Festival DVD box set released in 2002.) Hastings added: "David had a gorgeous voice but his problem was that he couldn't play rhythm very well, though he thought he could." The song was played as the second half of a medley with Stills’s as yet unrecorded song, "Rock and Roll Woman". What had become a disorganized jam ended with an upbeat performance "transformed in something of a boogie", according to Einarson.

In late June, Crosby again performed with group members and added harmony vocals (normally sung by Furay alone) in a Sunset Strip club. Young rejoined the group in August 1967 and "Bluebird" became a highlight of the group's performances. For an October 28, 1967, episode of the popular crime drama television series Mannix titled "Warning: Live Blueberries", the group performed "Bluebird" during a nightclub scene. In an interview, Stills expressed his preference for their live sound, such as that for their Mannix performance, and wished that the group had recording more live performances.

"Bluebird" was usually played as their last number and, with the extended jam ending, it could last twenty minutes. McDonough notes a perceived influence by the San Francisco Sound and a concert review in the Los Angeles Times compared Buffalo Springfield favorably to "the psychedelic efforts" of San Francisco's Grateful Dead and Blue Cheer, who also performed at the concert. On several occasions, Young described the group's live performances of "Bluebird", including one in Portland, Oregon in 1967:

At that point we were playing some very wild shows and the band was starting to stretch out on Steve's classic song "Bluebird", pushing and pulling it to its limit with psychedelic, string-bending, distortion-ridden, molten, and crashing jams ... That was the Buffalo Springfield that was never heard on record.

During Stills's and Young's guitar solo excursions, there were changes in tempo and rhythm, including touches of Ravel's Boléro. "Bluebird" was the final song performed by the Buffalo Springfield during their farewell concert at the Long Beach Arena on May 5, 1968.

== Other versions ==
Over the years, both Stephen Stills and Neil Young revisited "Bluebird". While preparing a follow-up to his first solo album, Stills recorded an R&B-influenced version of the song with the Memphis Horns as "Bluebird Revisited". Released as the closing track on Stephen Stills 2 (1971), music writer David Browne describes it as a "stab at the big-band rock newly being popularized by acts like Chicago [reworking it] into an overwrought but passionate breakup song". During their collaboration as the Stills-Young Band in 1976, live performances of "Bluebird" became a highlight. While touring in 2012, Crosby, Stills & Nash revived the song; a six-minute recording is included on CSN 2012.

In the mid-1980s, Young wrote a country music-influenced song titled "Beautiful Bluebird". Biographer Martin Halliwell calls it "a revival ... in a more lyrical mode [as] Young reaches for a similar metaphor to Stills when the song turns from a musing on home to reflect on a lost love that has flown away." "Beautiful Bluebird" was originally intended for Young's Old Ways (1985) album, but finally released as the opening track on Chrome Dreams II (2007).

The American hard rock group James Gang recorded the song for their 1969 debut album, Yer' Album. Music writers have described their 6:02 version as an "extended workout" and an "inspired reading".

In 2021, Los Lobos covered the song on their tribute to Los Angeles: Native Sons.

== Bibliography ==
- "Pop Spotlights". Billboard. Vol. 79, no. 26. July 1, 1967. ISSN 0006-2510.
- "Hot 100". Billboard. Vol. 79, no. 28. July 15, 1967. ISSN 0006-2510.
- "Hot 100". Billboard. Vol. 79, no. 35. September 2, 1967. ISSN 0006-2510.
- "Pick of the Week". Cash Box. Vol. 28, no. 49. July 1, 1967. ISSN 0008-7289.
- "Singles Reviews". Record World. Vol. 21, no. 1047. July 1, 1967. ISSN 0034-1622.
- Browne, David (2019). Crosby, Stills, Nash and Young: The Wild, Definitive Saga of Rock's Greatest Supergroup. New York City: Hachette Books. ISBN 978-0306922640.
- Coine, Robert (2003). "James Gang". In Buckley, Peter (ed.). The Rough Guide to Rock. London: Rough Guides. ISBN 1-85828-457-0.
- Collins, Judy (2012). Sweet Judy Blue Eyes: My Life in Music. New York City: Crown Archetype. ISBN 978-0307717351.
- Doggett, Peter (2019). CSNY: Crosby, Stills, Nash and Young. New York City: Simon and Schuster. ISBN 978-1501183027.
- Dugo, Mike (2023). Rock & Role: American Rock Group Appearances on Scripted U.S. Television Series (1964–1970). BearManor Media.
- Einarson, John (2001). Desperados: The Roots of Country Rock. New York City: Cooper Square Press. ISBN 978-1461607335.
- Einarson, John; Furay, Richie (2004). For What It's Worth: The Story of Buffalo Springfield. New York City: Taylor Trade. ISBN 978-0815412816.
- Halliwell, Martin (2015). Neil Young: American Traveller. London: Reaktion Books. ISBN 978-1780235493.
- Kubernik, Harvey (2015). Neil Young: Heart of Gold. London: Omnibus Press. ISBN 978-1783235797.
- McDonough, James (2010). Shakey: Neil Young's Biography. New York City: Random House. ISBN 978-0307373809.
- Moon, Tom (2008). 1,000 Recordings to Hear Before You Die: A Listener's Life List. Workman. ISBN 978-0761149415.
- Pollock, Bruce (2014). Rock Song Index: The 7500 Most Important Songs for the Rock and Roll Era. New York City: Routledge. ISBN 978-1135463038.
- Prown, Pete; Newquist, Harvey P. (1997). Legends of Rock Guitar: The Essential Reference of Rock's Greatest Guitarists. Milwaukee, Wisconsin: Hal Leonard. ISBN 978-0793540426.
- Roberts, David; Gedge, David (2016). Stephen Stills: Change Partners. This Day In Music Books. ISBN 978-1787591011.
- Unterberger, Richie (2003a). "Buffalo Springfield". In Buckley, Peter (ed.). The Rough Guide to Rock. Rough Guides. ISBN 978-1843531050.
- Unterberger, Richie (2003b). Eight Miles High: Folk-rock's Flight from Haight-Ashbury to Woodstock. Hal Leonard. ISBN 978-0879307431.
- Young, Neil (2014). Special Deluxe: A Memoir of Life & Cars. New York City: Penguin Group. ISBN 978-0-698-17715-4.
- Zimmer, Dave (2000). Crosby Stills and Nash: The Biography. Da Capo Press. ISBN 978-0306809743.
