= Ken Koblun =

Canadian musician (born 1946)

- Origin: Canada
- Genres: Rock
- Occupation: Musician
- Instrument: Bass guitar
- Formerly of: The Jades; The Squires; The Stardusters; Buffalo Springfield; 3's a Crowd

Ken Koblun is a Canadian musician who played alongside Neil Young in The Jades, the Squires, the Stardusters, and briefly Buffalo Springfield. He replaced Comrie Smith in 3's a Crowd, playing with the band from 1966 to 1967.

== Early years ==
Koblun began his music career as the bassist for the Squires, a teen band formed by Young in the early 1960s at Earl Grey Junior High School. After the band broke up, Koblun found work playing bass for various folk musicians. When Stephen Stills and Richie Furay were seeking to start a rock band in Los Angeles, a few months after Koblun had taken a trip to New York City in 1965, they could not find Neil Young, but did succeed in locating Koblun, whom they convinced to come to California to join the new Buffalo Springfield.

However, he stayed for only a few days before deciding to return to Canada where he joined up with 3's a Crowd. In January 1967, a replacement was needed for Springfield's bassist Bruce Palmer, who was fighting possible deportation. Koblun only played with them for about a month before the band decided his personality was undesirable and his bass playing not as good as they anticipated.

During that time he appeared in one of the few film clips of the band, doing lip synchronization to "Sit Down, I Think I Love You" on the television show Where The Action Is. Koblun did not record with the band, but Young's epic "Broken Arrow" is dedicated to Koblun in the sleeve notes of Buffalo Springfield Again.

Koblun appeared on the 3's a Crowd album Christopher's Movie Matinée.

He has worked with various musicians such as, Richie Furay, Stephen Stills, Dewey Martin, Donna Warner, David Wiffen, Trevor Veitch, Brent Titcomb, and Richard Patterson.
