= Nowadays Clancy Can't Even Sing =

- US single label

Single by Buffalo Springfield

from the album Buffalo Springfield
- B-side: "Go and Say Goodbye"
- Released: August 1966
- Recorded: July 18, 1966
- Studio: Gold Star, Hollywood
- Genre: Folk rock; country rock
- Length: 3:28
- Label: Atco
- Songwriter: Neil Young
- Producers: Charlie Greene; Brian Stone

Buffalo Springfield singles chronology
"Nowadays Clancy Can't Even Sing" (1966)	"Burned" (1966)

"Nowadays Clancy Can't Even Sing" is a song by the Canadian-American folk rock band Buffalo Springfield, released as the group's debut single in August 1966. Neil Young wrote the song in Yorkville in 1965 shortly after returning from a series of performances in Toronto, during a period when his bid at a solo career had been met with little positive response. The lyrics reflect metaphorically on Young's frustration toward his stalled career in music, and was inspired by Ross "Clancy" Smith, an aberrant classmate who incited awe in his school. Commentators recognize "Nowadays Clancy Can't Even Sing" as one of Buffalo Springfield's signature songs, as well as a milestone in Young's progression as a songwriter.

The song was the lead single to Buffalo Springfield's self-titled debut album, bubbling under the Billboard Hot 100 at number 110, and peaking at number 75 on the Canadian RPM 100 singles chart. Buffalo Springfield played "Nowadays Clancy Can't Even Sing" at many concerts during their stay in Los Angeles where it found regional success.

Young's original demo recording for Elektra Records was included on the compilation album The Archives Vol. 1 1963–1972 (2009), and a live version, from his 1968 solo tour, appears on Sugar Mountain – Live at Canterbury House 1968 (2008). The band's rendition appears on Retrospective: The Best of Buffalo Springfield (1969) and Buffalo Springfield (1973). Fever Tree recorded an orchestrated pop interpretation of the song in 1968; another version was recorded by the Carpenters.

== Background and recording ==
Buffalo Springfield biographer John Einarson has written of Neil Young experiencing a phase of creativity following his time spent performing as a solo musician in Toronto in 1965. While his former Squires bandmate Ken Koblun found immediate success as an in-demand bass guitarist, Young's career stalled amid stinging criticism of his concerts and material. A resigned Young recalled Toronto as a "very humbling experience", one, out of frustration, which galvanized him to write a string of introspective songs. The Toronto episode inspired the Young compositions "Runaround Babe", "The Ballad of Peggy Grover", and "I Ain't Got the Blues", among others.

Young wrote "Nowadays Clancy Can't Even Sing" within the same timeframe under the working title "Baby That Don't Mean a Thing", partially as a rebuttal to critics of his performances. In the book For What It's Worth, Young identified "Clancy" as his former Winnipeg high school classmate Ross "Clancy" Smith (1946-2024). Young described Smith as a "strange cat" – an aberrant figure tormented by others for singing hymns blithely. The theme "not to the loner but to the individualist", in Paul Williams' words, is most evident throughout the song; "That's who Neil Young is [an individualist]", Williams adds.

Richie Furay first heard "Nowadays Clancy Can't Even Sing" late in 1965 while Young was visiting his apartment in New York City. "I thought the song was really unique", Furay recalled of his first hearing, noting the quality already evident in Young's material. Furay performed the song as a solo singer during auditions at the Bitter End nightclub and committed it to tape. Fellow folk musician Jean Gurney commented "All things being equal, Richie was the preferred provider for that song. Neil's voice didn't lend itself well to such a complicated tune like that". Young recorded demos of "Nowadays Clancy Can't Even Sing" and six other originals in January 1966 at a session for Elektra Records in hopes the tapes would jumpstart his career, only to have them rejected. Once back in Toronto, Young had a chance encounter with Bruce Palmer, who offered him membership in the Mynah Birds. In April 1966, Young and Palmer moved to Los Angeles where they found creative fulfillment with another group – Buffalo Springfield.

The group's rendition of "Nowadays Clancy Can't Even Sing" was stylized as a folk rock song. Young contributed on guitar and played harmonica, and provided backing vocals to Buffalo Springfield's recording of the song at Gold Star Studios in Hollywood, featuring Furay singing lead. This song is done in an Irish form, with the verses in 2/4 rhythm, while the choruses were done in 3/4 rhythm. The style was influenced by the Irish folk singing group, the Clancy Brothers.

== Release and reception ==
Originally, the intention had been to release "Nowadays Clancy Can't Even Sing" as the B-side of the lead single from Buffalo Springfield, until Atco Records persuaded the band Young's song was the most obvious choice. The song was therefore issued on the A-side in August 1966 in Southern California with Stephen Stills' "Go and Say Goodbye", followed by national distribution a month later. The release was accompanied by a series of concerts in which Buffalo Springfield opened for the Byrds and shared bills with Johnny Rivers among others; at the Hollywood Bowl, the group opened for the Rolling Stones. In addition, Charlie Greene and Brian Stone, Buffalo Springfield's management team, bartered an advance tape of the Beatles' "A Day in the Life" to KHJ radio; in exchange, the station became the first to give "Nowadays Clancy Can't Even Sing" substantial airplay.

The single was successful in Los Angeles but achieved little attention elsewhere. "Nowadays Clancy Can't Even Sing" debuted on Billboard's Bubbling Under the Hot 100 chart at number 130 on August 20, peaked at number 110 on September 10, and disappeared from the chart one week later. In Canada, it reached number 75 on the RPM 100 chart around September 5, 1966. On the single's lackluster commercial performance, Furay later suggested "Nowadays Clancy Can't Even Sing" was "too deep" and "too ambitious" of a choice for the A-side, and considered "Do I Have to Come Right Out and Say It" and "Sit Down I Think I Love You" as songs better suited for pop radio. The song was issued on Buffalo Springfield in December 1966, providing evidence, in music historian Richie Unterberger's words, of Young already arriving as "a songwriter of great talent and enigmatic lyricism".

Cash Box said that it is a "pulsating, folk-ish item with some inventive unexpected melodic changes." Record World said it has "a different sound and a different and intriguing lyric." David V. Moskowitz in his book The 100 Greatest Bands of All Time calls the song one of the "gems" of the band's debut album and "the original Buffalo Springfield song", while Matthew Greenwald of AllMusic declared: "Young has written 100 other songs that are probably 'better' than this, but he's never written anything else quite like it". Paul Williams praises the "beauty" of Young's melody and unique use of lyrical fragments to express "his evident sincerity". To Williams, "Nowadays Clancy Can't Even Sing" is "the breakthrough" song – the point where Young "asserted his power as a songwriter".

Young's original demo recording of "Nowadays Clancy Can't Even Sing" was officially released on the box set The Archives Vol. 1 1963–1972, in 2009. A live version of the song by Young, recorded at the Canterbury House in 1968 shortly after Buffalo Springfield disbanded, was included on the album Sugar Mountain – Live at Canterbury House 1968. Another live version, recorded as part of an acoustic set, was released on "Carnegie Hall 1970", as part of Neil Young's Bootleg Series in 2021. Buffalo Springfield's rendition was compiled on Retrospective: The Best of Buffalo Springfield (1969) and Buffalo Springfield (1973).

== Personnel ==
- Richie Furay – lead vocal
- Stephen Stills – vocals, guitar
- Dewey Martin – drums
- Neil Young – vocals, guitar, harmonica
- Bruce Palmer – bass guitar

== Other renditions ==
The psychedelic rock band Fever Tree recorded the song for their 1968 self-titled album. The song was produced by Scott and Vivian Holtzman, and arranged by David Angel who also worked on Love's Forever Changes (1967). Unterberger, who described the song as highly orchestrated, attests Fever Tree's rendition "must count as one of the earliest covers of a Neil Young composition". On Uni Records, "Clancy" was also released as a single in 1969 but failed to chart. Also in 1969, the Carpenters included their own take of the song on their album Ticket to Ride.
