= Last Time Around =

Studio album by Buffalo Springfield
- Released: July 30, 1968
- Recorded: February 26, 1967 – March 1968
- Genre: Folk rock, psychedelic rock, country rock
- Length: 32:54
- Label: Atco
- Producer: Jim Messina

Buffalo Springfield chronology
Buffalo Springfield Again (1967)	Last Time Around (1968)	Retrospective: The Best of Buffalo Springfield (1969)

Last Time Around is the third and final studio album by the Canadian-American folk rock band Buffalo Springfield, released in July 1968. The line-up at the time officially consisted of Neil Young, Stephen Stills, Richie Furay, Dewey Martin, Bruce Palmer, and Jim Messina, though the band itself had essentially broken up and the album was put together from scattered recording sessions between November 1967 and March 1968, with "Pretty Girl Why" stemming from the early 1967 sessions for the unreleased Stampede. Jim Messina acted as the album producer and mixing engineer, with input from Furay, as the two compiled the record to fulfil the band's last contractual obligation to its label. A number of guest musicians (some uncredited) appeared on the album, notably pedal steel guitar player Rusty Young.

By the time this album was released, the members were already involved in their next projects: Richie Furay, Jim Messina, and Rusty Young were busy forming the country-rock band Poco, Stephen Stills was forming Crosby, Stills & Nash, and Neil Young was about to record his first solo album. Dewey Martin tried to revive the Buffalo Springfield name with new members, but was sued by Stills and Young to prevent him from doing so. Bruce Palmer briefly joined Crosby, Stills & Nash, but legal problems kept him from producing much musical output during the rest of the 1960s.

== History and songs ==
Last Time Around was compiled by Jim Messina and Furay to fulfil the band's last contractual obligation to its label. By the time it was completed the group had functionally disbanded, with the cover photo consisting of a montage of the individual members, with Young looking away from the direction of the others.

The album contained songs that were important to the authors. Neil Young has performed both "I Am a Child" and "On the Way Home" in concert throughout his career, the latter both solo and with CSNY, the Transband and the Bluenotes. "Kind Woman" became one of Richie Furay's best known songs; he performed it with Poco and throughout his solo career. Stephen Stills merged "Questions" into "Carry On," the lead track on Déjà Vu; it would become a feature of the Crosby, Stills & Nash concert repertoire. Stills would record "Questions" again with Judy Collins on their collaborative 2017 album. The lyrics to "The Hour of Not Quite Rain" were the result of an August 1967 contest run by Los Angeles radio station KHJ. Entrants would write a poem to be set to music and recorded by the Buffalo Springfield. The prize was $1000 plus publishing royalties. The winning entry was written by Micki Callen.

== Production ==
The album was primarily recorded between November 1967 and March 1968 at Sunset Sound, Los Angeles, with "Pretty Girl Why" taken from February 1967 sessions for the unreleased Stampede LP. Additional work was done at Atlantic Studios, New York City on "Pretty Girl Why" and "Kind Woman". New member Jim Messina was the album producer and mixing engineer, with input from Furay. Messina also played bass on three tracks and sang lead vocal on "Carefree Country Day". The five original members only recorded together on one track, "On the Way Home", with many of the songs during the sessions usually recorded alone by the main songwriter, augmented by session musicians. These musicians (some uncredited) included pedal steel guitar player Rusty Young, Buddy Miles on drums and Richard Davis on bass. Original bassist Bruce Palmer only appears on "On the Way Home", with his interim replacement Jim Fielder on "Pretty Girl Why". Palmer's face is shown on the back cover photo montage with a humorous, partially obscured, "mad" sign aligned, due to his resembling Alfred E. Neuman in the shot.

Outtakes from the sessions, later included on the band's self-titled box set, include Young's "Whatever Happened To Saturday Night" (with a lead vocal by Furay) and instrumental "Falcon Lake (Ash On The Floor)" along with Furay's "What A Day" (re-recorded and released on Poco's debut album Pickin' Up the Pieces). Young also purportedly recorded an early version of "Old Laughing Lady" for the album, although this has not turned up on any later archival release.

== Chart performance ==
The album debuted on Billboard magazine's Top LP's chart in the issue dated August 17, 1968, peaking at No. 42 during a nineteen-week run on the chart. It would go on to chart much higher on the other two US major music magazines, Cash Box (where it peaked at No. 18 on September 14) and Record World (where it peaked at No. 16 on September 7).

== Critical reception ==
Professional ratings
Review scores
Source	Rating
Rolling Stone	(favourable)
Esquire	(favourable)
AllMusic	3/5 stars
Encyclopedia of Popular Music	3/5 stars

Barry Gifford of Rolling Stone called Last Time Around Buffalo Springfield's "most beautiful record" and "a final testament to their multi-talent". Robert Christgau, writing for Esquire, called it a "beautiful farewell album" of "countrified music", in which "country elements are incorporated into a total style". Cashbox noted that "While retaining a strong creative identity, the quintet manages, on the set, to produce ultra-commercial sides with wide appeal." Ellen Sander, writing for The New York Times, gushed "they have made an art out of music that is unfailingly pleasant; no less moving for its tasteful, understated neatness...The entire album has a fresh, natural feeling about it, not unlike a soft summer rain."

Richie Unterberger was less enthusiastic in a retrospective review for AllMusic. He found Young's songs for the album "outstanding", but believed Stills' songwriting was a decline from the group's previous albums. Young has been especially critical of the album, saying in an interview that "It was such a disgraceful mess that I can't bear to listen to it again. The mixes are incredibly awful, a very disturbing point," and saying in another interview that "the Springfield's last real album was 'Buffalo Springfield Again'."

It was voted number 505 in the third edition of Colin Larkin's All Time Top 1000 Albums (2000).

== Track listing ==
Side one
No.	Title	Writer(s)	Lead vocals	Length
1.	"On the Way Home"	Neil Young	Furay	2:25
2.	"It's So Hard to Wait"	Richie Furay, Young	Furay	2:03
3.	"Pretty Girl Why"	Stephen Stills	Stills	2:24
4.	"Four Days Gone"	Stills	Stills	2:53
5.	"Carefree Country Day"	Jim Messina	Messina	2:35
6.	"Special Care"	Stills	Stills	3:30

Side two
No.	Title	Writer(s)	Lead vocals	Length
7.	"The Hour of Not Quite Rain"	Micki Callen, Furay	Furay	3:45
8.	"Questions"	Stills	Stills	2:52
9.	"I Am a Child"	Young	Young	2:15
10.	"Merry-Go-Round"	Furay	Furay	2:02
11.	"Uno Mundo"	Stills	Stills	2:00
12.	"Kind Woman"	Furay	Furay	4:10

== Personnel ==
Buffalo Springfield

- Richie Furay - guitar (1–3, 8, 10–12), vocals (1–3, 5, 7, 10, 12)
- Dewey Martin - drums (1–3, 9, 11)
- Jim Messina - bass (2, 4, 5, 8), vocals (5, 12)
- Stephen Stills - guitar (1–4, 6, 8, 10, 11), piano (4, 6, 8), B3 organ (6, 8, 11), bass (8), clavinet (6), vibes (1), percussion (11), handclaps (11), backing vocal (1, 5, 8, 10), lead vocal (3, 4, 6, 8, 11)
- Neil Young - guitar (3, 9, 10), harmonica (9), piano (1), backing vocal (1), lead vocal (9)
- Bruce Palmer - bass (1, 10)

Additional personnel

- Jim Fielder - bass (3)
- Buddy Miles - drums (6)
- Jimmy Karstein - drums (8, 10)
- Gary Marker - bass (9)
- Jeremy Stuart - harpsichord, calliope, bells (10)
- Rusty Young - pedal steel guitar (12)
- Richard Davis - bass (12)
- unidentified - horns, orchestra (1), saxophone, clarinet, piano (2), drums (4), guitars, drums (5), bass, drums, harpsichord, orchestra (7), bass, trumpet (11), piano, drums (12)

Track numbers refer to CD and digital releases of the album.

== Production ==
- Producer: Jim Messina
- Engineers: Adrian Barber, Phil Iehle, Jim Messina

== Charts ==
Chart (1968)	Peak position
US Billboard Top LP's	42
US Cashbox Albums Chart	18
US Record World Albums Chart	16
