= The Cycle Is Complete =

Studio album by Bruce Palmer
- Released: September 4, 1970
- Recorded: Sound Factory, Hollywood, CA
- Genre: Psychedelic rock
- Length: 36:52
- Label: Verve Forecast
- Producer: Don Hall, Bruce Palmer

Professional ratings
Review scores
Source	Rating
Allmusic	4.5/5 stars
Uncut	3/5 stars

The Cycle Is Complete is the debut and only full-length studio album by the Canadian musician Bruce Palmer, released on September 4, 1970 by Verve Forecast. The album was re-issued on CD by Collectors' Choice in 2003. Because of issues with the original masters, the music on the re-release was significantly remixed and content from alternate takes was used to replace some of the original music, especially on "Alpha – Omega – Apocalypse".

== Track listing ==
All music is composed by Bruce Palmer

Side one
No.	Title	Length
1.	"Alpha – Omega – Apocalypse"	16:45
2.	"Interlude"	1:55

Side two
No.	Title	Length
1.	"Oxo"	8:00
2.	"Calm Before the Storm"	10:12

== Personnel ==
Adapted from The Cycle Is Complete liner notes.

Musicians

- Richard Aplanalp – oboe, flute
- Rick James – vocals, percussion
- Jeff Kaplan – piano
- Paul Lagos – drums
- Bruce Palmer – acoustic guitar, electric guitar, bass guitar, production
- Templeton Parcely – violin
- Danny Ray – congas
- Ed Roth – organ

Production and additional personnel

- Ed Caraeff – photography
- Don Hall – production
- Dave Hassinger – engineering

== Release history ==
Region	Date	Label	Format	Catalog
United States	1970	Verve Forecast	LP	FTS 3086
United States	2003	Collectors' Choice	CD	CCM-375-2
