= Sweathog =

American rock band

Sweathog was an American Southern rock band.

Group members Lenny Goldsmith and David Leonard Johnson first met in 1967 while Johnson was playing in a group called The Persuaders at the Wayne Manor nightclub in Sunnyvale, California. After Johnson did a stint with the Beach Boys and Dr. John, he reconvened with Lenny and formed Sweathog along with Barry "Frosty" Smith, also known as Bartholomew Eugene Smith-Frost, who at that time was playing with Lee Michaels and had been in Lenny's band in San Jose. Robert Morris "B.J." Jones (November 9, 1942 – June 15, 2013) played with Johnson in Blue Mountain Eagle and was invited to join Sweathog.

In October 1970, Sweathog became the house band at The Chronicle, a night club in the San Fernando Valley managed by Ed Jordan. Soon after, they released two albums on CBS Records in the early 1970s, and are best known for their 1971 hit single "Hallelujah", which hit #15 in Canada, #33 on the Billboard Hot 100 chart, and peaked at number 93 in Australia in 1972. Hallelujah was written by Mitch Bottler, Roberta Twain and Gary Zekley.

Frank Barsalona signed Sweathog to the Premier Talent Agency and became a top opening act for Black Sabbath, Emerson, Lake & Palmer, The J. Geils Band, Edgar Winter's White Trash, Grand Funk Railroad and more.

In 1973, Johnson and Jones reformed Sweathog with Warren Rex Ludwick and Bobby Burns. Johnson met Burns during the 1965 Shindig! live tour. Ludwick went on to play with Willie Nelson. Of the four original members, Frosty relocated to Austin, Texas (where he died in 2017), Goldsmith is in the real estate business in Malibu, California, and his sons Taylor and Griffin are in the band Dawes, Jones died June 15, 2013, in South Dakota at age 70, and Johnson owns an advertising agency, ReMIX Media Group, in Aspen, Colorado.

Barry "Frosty" Smith (born Barry Eugene Smith on March 20, 1946, in Bellingham, Washington) died after a long illness on April 12, 2017, at the age of 71.

== Band members ==
- Lenny Lee Goldsmith (vocals, keyboards)
- Robert Morris "B.J." Jones (vocals, guitar; died 2013)
- David L. Johnson (vocals, bass guitar)
- Barry "Frosty" Smith (drums; died 2017)
- Rex W. Ludwick (drums)
- Bobby Burns (vocals, keyboards)
- Leonard Stogel (manager)

== Discography ==
- Sweathog (CBS Records, 1971)
- Hallelujah (CBS, 1972)
