= Blue Mountain Eagle (band) =

American rock band 1969-70

Blue Mountain Eagle was a short-lived American psychedelic/acid rock group that evolved out of New Buffalo Springfield in August 1969 and recorded a lone album for Atlantic/Atco Records, which they were personally signed to by label founder Ahmet Ertegun.

== Origins ==
Rhythm guitarist/vocalist David Price (born September 23, 1944, in Ballinger, Texas) and drummer/vocalist Don Poncher (born July 29, 1947, in Chicago, Illinois) were original members of The New Buffalo Springfield, formed in September 1968 by Dewey Martin, the drummer in the original Buffalo Springfield.

David Price had previously played with Austin, Texas group, The Chelsea in the mid-1960s and (briefly), L.A-based Armadillo in mid-1968. Price was also Davy Jones's stand-in in The Monkees TV show thanks to his connections with his old friend Mike Nesmith. Don Poncher, who'd worked with Tex Williams when he was 16 years old, had also played with Brothers Keepers in the San Fernando Valley in the mid-1960s.

The new version of the legendary group, which also included lead guitarist Gary Rowles, bass player Bob Apperson and horn player Jim Price, played extensively between November 1968 and February 1969 before imploding when Stephen Stills and Neil Young took legal action to prevent Martin from using the "Buffalo Springfield" name.

In spring 1969, Dewey Martin and David Price formed a second version of New Buffalo Springfield with bass player/vocalist Randy Fuller (born January 29, 1944, in Hobbs, New Mexico) (formerly of Bobby Fuller Four) and lead guitarist/vocalist Bob BJ Jones (born November 9, 1942, in Woodbury, New Jersey, died on June 15, 2013, in Sioux Falls, South Dakota), who'd worked with Little Richard briefly. The new line up, now going by the name Blue Buffalo, recorded some tracks for Atlantic which were never completed and in June added second lead guitarist Joey Newman from L.A band, Touch. Newman (b. Vern Kjellberg, August 29, 1947, Seattle, Washington) had previously worked with Don & The Good Times, The Liberty Party and Merrilee Rush & The Turnabouts.

After a tour of the North West (billed as New Buffalo Springfield) in July 1969, the musicians sacked Dewey Martin and returned to Los Angeles where they added Don Poncher from the earlier line up.

== Signs to Atlantic Records ==
In August, the group adopted the name Blue Mountain Eagle, which the musicians had taken from a newspaper in Grant County, Oregon during their time with Dewey Martin. After Ahmet Ertegun personally signed them to Atlantic Records, the band recorded its lone album live in one session at Wally Heider's studios in Los Angeles in December 1969. The group toured extensively, opening for Santana, Jimi Hendrix, Love, Pink Floyd and many others.

During April 1970, Randy Fuller left to briefly join Dewey Martin's Medicine Ball and the band recruited studio bassist David L. Johnson (born October 21, 1945, in Burbank, California) from the Beach Boys and Dr John's touring band. The following month, Atlantic released the group's eponymous lone album which only sold a few thousand copies. The group then recorded a version of Stephen Stills's "Marianne" as a single but when that failed to become a hit, the group disbanded around September 1970.

Blue Mountain Eagle 1970

Tracks:

01. Love Is Here (Joey Newman) - 4:24

02. Yellow's Dream (Joey Newman) - 2:44

03. Feel Like A Bandit (David Price) - 3:01

04. Troubles (Meyer/Jones) - 3:03

05. Loveless Lives (Don Poncher, Bob Jones, Joey Newman) - 3:30

06. No Regrets (Don Poncher, David Price) - 4:09

07. Winding Your String (Joey Newman) - 2:56

08. Sweet Mama (Randy Fuller) - 4:18

09. Promise Of Love (Joey Newman) - 3:00

10. Trivial Sum (Furlong/Bowen) - 3:11

Bonuses:

11. Marianne (Bob B.J. Jones

12. Marianne (stereo) (Stephen Stills) - 2:30

13. Marianne (mono) (Stephen Stills) - 2:24

Personnel:

- Joey Newman - lead guitar, keyboards, vocals

- Bob "BJ" Jones - lead guitar, vocals

- David Price - rhythm guitar, vocals

- Randy Fuller - bass, guitar, vocals

- Don Poncher - drums, vocals

- David L. Johnson - bass, vocals

+ - Bill Halverson - engineer, producer

BJ Jones and Johnson went on to form Sweathog in 1971. Newman went on to Stepson and Poncher did numerous sessions.

== Sources ==
Nick Warburton's interviews with David Price, David L. Johnson, Randy Fuller, Joey Newman, Bob Jones and Don Poncher, March–April 2008
