= Broken Arrow (Buffalo Springfield song) =

Song by Buffalo Springfield

from the album Buffalo Springfield Again
- Released: November 18, 1967
- Recorded: August 25 & September 5–18, 1967
- Studio: Columbia Recording Studio; Sunset Sound, Hollywood
- Genre: Psychedelic rock; art rock; proto-prog; jazz fusion
- Length: 6:13
- Label: Atco
- Songwriter: Neil Young
- Producers: Richie Furay; Jack Nitzsche; Stephen Stills; Neil Young

"Broken Arrow" is a song written by Canadian singer-songwriter Neil Young and recorded by Buffalo Springfield on their 1967 album Buffalo Springfield Again. It was recorded in August and September 1967 at Columbia Recording Studios and Sunset Sound Recorders. It incorporates musical ideas from "Down Down Down," a demo Young recorded with Buffalo Springfield (later released on their eponymous box set).

"Broken Arrow" was confessional folk rock. It consists of three parts in three different time signatures interspersed with snippets of sounds, featuring organ, a jazz combo with piano, bass, drums, and a clarinet. The song begins with audience applause (taken not from a Buffalo Springfield show, as some expect, but rather from a concert by the Beatles) and the opening of "Mr. Soul" (which opens the album) recorded in the studio. The second verse begins with the sound of an audience cheering, while an organ plays a version of "Take Me Out to the Ball Game", before it fades into piano and drums and opens into the verse. The third verse begins the sound of a military snare drum that plays drum rolls, first quietly, and getting louder in each succession, until the fifth time, the drums loop and overlap and cut off to begin the third verse. The Jazz combo plays an improvisation, first taken up by the clarinet, and followed by the piano, until it fades out, and a heart beating sound is played until it gradually fades out.

Each of the three verses uses surreal imagery to deal with emotions (emptiness of fame, teenage angst, hopelessness), and contains self-references to Buffalo Springfield and Young. They all end with the same lines:

Did you see them, did you see them?
Did you see them in the river?
They were there to wave to you.
Could you tell that the empty-quivered
Brown-skinned Indian on the banks
That were crowded and narrow,
Held a broken arrow?

An acoustic solo version of the song appears on the Neil Young live album Sugar Mountain: Live at Canterbury House 1968 which was released on Reprise Records in 2008.

== Historical references ==
The Creek Indians held a ceremony after the Civil War that included a breaking of an arrow to symbolize the war's end.

== Personnel ==
=== Buffalo Springfield ===
- Neil Young – guitar, vocals
- Stephen Stills – guitar
- Richie Furay – guitar, vocals
- Bruce Palmer – bass
- Dewey Martin – drums, vocals

=== Additional personnel ===
- Chris Sarns – guitar
- Don Randi – piano, organ
- Harvey Newmark – bass
- Jim Horn – clarinet
- Hal Blaine – drums
