= Neil Young in Berlin =

In Berlin

Video by Neil Young
- Released: 1983
- Recorded: October 1982
- Venue: Deutschlandhalle, Berlin, Germany
- Genre: Rock
- Length: 60 minutes
- Label: VidAmerica (VHS); Rhino (DVD)
- Director: Michael Lindsay-Hogg
- Producer: Lorne Michaels

Neil Young in Berlin is a live video by Neil Young, directed by Michael Lindsay-Hogg, and recorded in October 1982 during the European Tour for his album Trans. It includes the song "After Berlin" written especially for that concert and only performed once.

It was first issued on VHS and later on LaserDisc and DVD.

== Reception ==
Professional ratings
Review scores
Source	Rating
Allmusic	4/5 stars

Writing for Allmusic, critic William Ruhlman called the video "a good summary of Young's career, from "Cinnamon Girl" to the then-current Trans."

== Track listing ==
All songs written by Neil Young.

1. "Cinnamon Girl"
2. "Computer Age"
3. "Little Thing Called Love"
4. "Old Man"
5. "The Needle and the Damage Done"
6. "After the Gold Rush"
7. "Transformer Man"
8. "Sample and Hold"
9. "Like a Hurricane"
10. "Hey Hey My My"
11. "Berlin"

On the DVD, "Like a Hurricane" is omitted in the track list on the back cover, but is still present on the disc.

== Personnel ==
- Neil Young – vocal, guitar
- Ralph Molina – drums
- Nils Lofgren – guitar
- Bruce Palmer – bass
- Ben Keith – pedal steel, lap steel, keyboards
- Joe Lala – percussion
- Joel Bernstein – Synthesizer
- Larry Cragg – banjo
