= Mr. Soul =

Single by Buffalo Springfield

from the album Buffalo Springfield Again
- A-side: "Bluebird"
- Released: June 15, 1967
- Recorded: January 9, 1967
- Studio: Atlantic, New York City
- Genre: Folk rock; psychedelic rock; hard rock; R&B
- Length: 2:35
- Label: Atco
- Songwriter: Neil Young
- Producers: Brian Stone; Charles Greene

Buffalo Springfield singles chronology
"For What It's Worth" (1966)	"Mr. Soul" (1967)	"Rock 'n' Roll Woman" (1967)

"Mr. Soul" is a song by Neil Young recorded by the Canadian-American rock band Buffalo Springfield in 1967. It was released June 15, 1967, as the B-side to their fourth single "Bluebird" and later included on the group's second album Buffalo Springfield Again.

== Background ==
"Mr. Soul" is about Neil Young's personal problems with fame and disregard for rock stardom. It was written by Young after he had an epilepsy attack after an early show with Buffalo Springfield in San Francisco. (Many in the audience wondered if the attack was part of the act.) While a patient at UCLA Medical Center, he wrote the song once he was awake and recovering and told to return for further tests. The lyrics reflected Young's experience, feeling as though he was about to die. Thereupon, he was advised by his doctor to never take LSD or any other hallucinogenic drugs.

Composed on an acoustic twelve-string guitar, the dark and moody song is in double drop D tuning, which Young used in a number of other songs, such as "Ohio" and "Cinnamon Girl". On the third track of Sugar Mountain – Live at Canterbury House 1968, Young stated that, "A lot of songs take a long time to write. Generally they take an hour and a half, two hours to write. But this one took only five minutes". The main riff of the song is based on a modified version of the riff used in the Rolling Stones "Satisfaction" Young subsequently recorded several other versions of the song, often with marked stylistic changes. The song has been described by music writers as folk rock, psychedelic rock, hard rock, and R&B.

In a contemporary review of the song, Cash Box called it "a rhythmic, funky-filled stanza".

An excerpt of a live version of the song is heard in the song "Broken Arrow" (1967), with the sounds of cheering crowds, taken from the cheering for the Beatles.

== Cover versions and variations ==
Young has frequently performed the song both solo and with various backing bands. Live recordings appear on Sugar Mountain – Live at Canterbury House 1968, 1993's Unplugged and 1997's Year of the Horse with Crazy Horse. In addition, Young re-recorded the song in a synthrock style on his 1982 album Trans, with vocals processed with a vocoder; a live performance of this version also appears in the film Solo Trans. During the 2016 Bridge School Benefit concerts, Young guested with Metallica to perform an acoustic cover of the song.

Cher recorded a cover of the song for her 1975 album Stars. In 1984, new wave band Wire Train covered the song as a bonus track of their album In A Chamber. In 2004, Rush covered the song on their cover EP of songs from the 1960s, Feedback. The song has also been recorded by The Everly Brothers in December 1968, but was not released until 1984 on their studio album Nice Guys.

Iron & Wine covered the song on his live album Iron & Wine Live Bonnaroo, released in 2005.

The Icicle Works covered the song on the 12-inch version of All the Daughters (Of Her Father's House).

Model Zero covered the song on their self titled album from 2019.

== Personnel ==
Personnel taken from Buffalo Springfield Again liner notes.

Buffalo Springfield

- Neil Young – lead vocals, lead guitar
- Stephen Stills – rhythm guitar, backing vocals
- Richie Furay – rhythm guitar, backing vocals
- Bruce Palmer – bass guitar
- Dewey Martin – drums

Production

- Brian Stone – production
- Charles Greene – production
