= Buffalo Springfield Again =

Studio album by Buffalo Springfield
- Released: October 30, 1967
- Recorded: January 9 – September 18, 1967
- Studios: Columbia, Sunset Sound and Gold Star, Los Angeles; Atlantic, New York City
- Genres: Folk rock; psychedelia; country folk; hard rock
- Length: 34:07
- Label: Atco
- Producers: Stephen Stills; Neil Young; Richie Furay; Dewey Martin; Jim Messina; Jack Nitzsche; Ahmet Ertegun; Brian Stone; Charles Greene

Buffalo Springfield chronology
Buffalo Springfield (1966)	Buffalo Springfield Again (1967)	Last Time Around (1968)

Singles from Buffalo Springfield Again
- 1. "Bluebird" / "Mr. Soul" Released: June 1967; 2. "Rock & Roll Woman" / "A Child's Claim to Fame" Released: September 1967; 3. "Expecting to Fly" / "Everydays" Released: December 1967

Professional ratings
Review scores
Source	Rating
AllMusic	5/5 stars
Rolling Stone	(favorable)
The Village Voice	A−
Encyclopedia of Popular Music	5/5 stars

Buffalo Springfield Again is the second album by Buffalo Springfield, released on Atco Records in October 1967. The album features some of the group's best-known songs, including "Mr. Soul", "Bluebird", "Expecting to Fly" and "Rock & Roll Woman", all of which were released as singles. In contrast to the band's hastily made debut album, recording for Again took place over a protracted nine-month span and was fraught with dysfunction, with each member eventually producing his own material largely independent of one another.

The album was a moderate commercial success, peaking at number 44 on the Billboard Top LPs chart, and came to be regarded by many rock critics as a classic of the psychedelic era. In 2003, the album was ranked number 188 on Rolling Stone magazine's list of the 500 greatest albums of all time, maintaining the rating in a 2012 revised list. The album was included in Robert Christgau's "Basic Record Library" of 1950s and 1960s recordings—published in Christgau's Record Guide: Rock Albums of the Seventies (1981)—and in Robert Dimery's 1001 Albums You Must Hear Before You Die. It was voted number 165 in Colin Larkin's All Time Top 1000 Albums in 2000.

== Background ==
Several factors may have contributed to the slow pace of the recording sessions, including that bassist Bruce Palmer had been deported in January and had re-entered the United States illegally to continue working with the band, and guitarist Neil Young had quit and rejoined the group on several occasions, notably absent for the band's appearance at the famed Monterey Pop Festival where David Crosby substituted in his place at the request of guitarist Stephen Stills.

The album features the first recordings of songs written by guitarist Richie Furay, who had not contributed any material to the band's debut album. Also unlike the previous record, which had been recorded in its entirety by the band proper, session musicians appeared on various tracks as indicated on the album's inner sleeve. Palmer's deportation problems necessitated the contributions of outside bass players. During one of the times that Young had left the band, he had booked a studio to record "Expecting to Fly," with session musicians under the impression it was for a Neil Young solo project rather than for Buffalo Springfield.

Jack Nitzsche provided the musical arrangements for "Expecting to Fly"; it does not feature any members of the Springfield. Nitzsche would continue to work with Young through the early 1970s on both his solo debut album and his best-selling Harvest, also becoming a member of Young's backing bands Crazy Horse and The Stray Gators.

The album includes an early country rock track by Furay, "A Child's Claim to Fame." The track "Rock & Roll Woman" allegedly includes vocals by Crosby, who also allegedly had a hand in its composition; whether true or not, Stills acknowledges the genesis of the song was from jamming with Crosby. Cash Box said of "Rock & Roll Woman" that it's a "mid-tempo rock ballad" and that "throaty vocals with a shimmering group backing are spiced with some outstanding guitar showing." Record World called "Rock & Roll Woman" an "imaginative, different rock song."

Mark Prendergast comments on Young's dedication: "When he began making sound collages on Buffalo Springfield Again (1967) he showed that, for him, studio production was as important as content." Young's extended piece "Broken Arrow" begins with audience applause (taken not from a Buffalo Springfield show, but rather from a concert by the Beatles) and the opening of "Mr. Soul" (which opens the album) recorded live in the studio. The back cover of the album includes a lengthy list of people thanked as influence and inspiration, some of whom are musicians who contributed but were unaccredited. The album is dedicated to Barry Friedman, and listed as a York/Pala production. The album was remastered for compact disc in HDCD and reissued on June 24, 1997.

== Track listing ==
Side one
No.	Title	Writer(s)	Lead vocals	Length
1.	"Mr. Soul"	Neil Young	Young	2:48
2.	"A Child's Claim to Fame"	Richie Furay	Furay	2:09
3.	"Everydays"	Stephen Stills	Stills	2:38
4.	"Expecting to Fly"	Young	Young	3:39
5.	"Bluebird"	Stills	Stills and Furay	4:28

Side two
No.	Title	Writer(s)	Lead vocals	Length
1.	"Hung Upside Down"	Stills	Furay and Stills	3:24
2.	"Sad Memory"	Furay	Furay	3:00
3.	"Good Time Boy"	Furay	Dewey Martin	2:11
4.	"Rock & Roll Woman"	Stills	Stills	2:44
5.	"Broken Arrow"	Young	Young and Furay	6:11

== Personnel ==
Adapted from band researcher and archivist Joel Bernstein.

Buffalo Springfield

- Stephen Stills – vocals, guitars, keyboards
- Neil Young – vocals, guitars
- Richie Furay – vocals, rhythm guitar
- Bruce Palmer – bass guitar
- Dewey Martin – vocals, drums

Session musicians

- Russ Titelman – guitar on "Expecting to Fly"
- Doug Hastings – guitar on "Rock & Roll Woman"
- Chris Sarns – guitar on "Broken Arrow"
- James Burton – Dobro on "A Child's Claim to Fame"
- Charlie Chin – banjo on "Bluebird"
- Jack Nitzsche – electric piano on "Expecting to Fly"
- Don Randi – organ on "Broken Arrow", piano on "Expecting to Fly" and "Broken Arrow", harpsichord on "Expecting to Fly"
- Jim Fielder – bass guitar on "Everydays"
- Bobby West – bass guitar on "Bluebird"
- Carol Kaye – bass guitar on "Expecting to Fly"
- Harvey Newmark – bass guitar on jazz theme of "Broken Arrow"
- Jim Gordon – drums, vibes, timpani on "Expecting to Fly"
- Hal Blaine – drums on jazz theme of "Broken Arrow"
- Jim Horn – clarinet on jazz theme of "Broken Arrow"
- The American Soul Train – horns on "Good Time Boy"

Production

- Producers – Brian Stone (Track 1), Charles Greene (Track 1), Neil Young (Tracks 2, 3, 4, 9, 10), Stephen Stills (Tracks 3, 5, 6, 9), Ahmet Ertegun (Tracks 3, 5), Jack Nitzsche (Track 4), Jim Messina (Track 6), Richie Furay (Track 7), Dewey Martin (Track 8)
- Recording engineers – Bruce Tergesen (Track 1), Ross Myerling (Tracks 2, 6), Jim Messina (Tracks 2, 6, 8, 9, 10), James Hilton (Track 3), Bruce Botnick (Tracks 4, 5), William Brittan (Track 7), Bill Lazarus (Tracks 7, 10), Tom May (Track 10)
- Design – Loring Eutemey
- Cover illustration – Eve Babitz
- HDCD digital mastering – Tim Mulligan
- Analog to digital transfers – John Nowland, Pflash Pflaumer

== Charts ==
Chart (1968)	Peak position
US Billboard Top LPs	44
US Cash Box Albums Chart	33
US Record World Albums Chart	36

Singles - Billboard (United States)
Year	Single	Chart	Position
June 1967	"Bluebird" (1:59 edit) / "Mr Soul"	Pop Singles	58
September 1967	"Rock And Roll Woman" / "A Child's Claim To Fame"	Pop Singles	44
December 1967	"Expecting To Fly" / "Everydays"	Pop Singles	98

Singles - Cash Box (United States)
Year	Single	Chart	Position
June 1967	"Bluebird" (1:59 edit) / "Mr Soul"	Pop Singles	68
September 1967	"Rock and Roll Woman" / "A Child's Claim to Fame"	Pop Singles	52
December 1967	"Expecting To Fly" / "Everydays"	Pop Singles	99

Singles - Record World (United States)
Year	Single	Chart	Position
June 1967	"Bluebird" (1:59 edit) / "Mr Soul"	Pop Singles	63
September 1967	"Rock and Roll Woman" / "A Child's Claim to Fame"	Pop Singles	39
December 1967	"Expecting to Fly" / "Everydays"	Pop Singles	92
