= Buffalo Springfield =

Canadian and American rock band

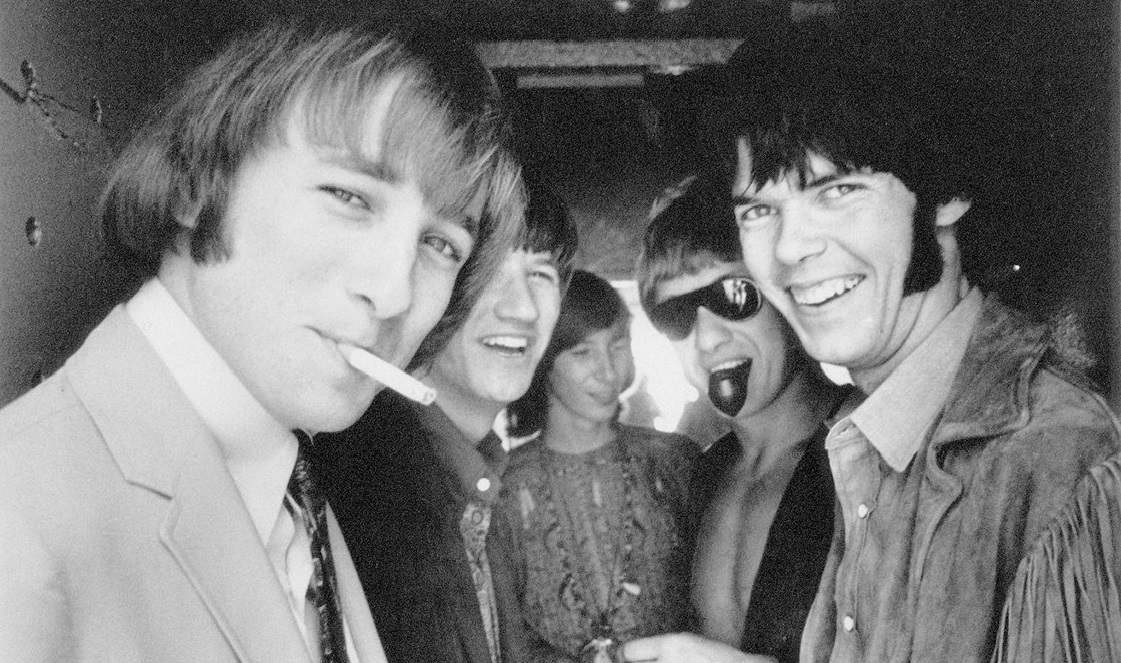
- The band in 1966, with, from left: Stephen Stills, Richie Furay, Bruce Palmer, Dewey Martin and Neil Young

Background information
- Origin: Los Angeles, California, U.S.
- Genres: Folk rock; psychedelic rock; country rock
- Years active: 1966–1968; 2010–2012
- Labels: Atco; Atlantic
- Spinoffs: Crosby, Stills, & Nash; Crosby, Stills, Nash & Young
- Past members: Richie Furay; Stephen Stills; Neil Young; Dewey Martin; Bruce Palmer; Jim Messina; Doug Hastings; Ken Koblun; Jim Fielder

Buffalo Springfield was a rock band formed in Los Angeles in 1966 by Canadians Neil Young, Bruce Palmer, and Dewey Martin and Americans Stephen Stills and Richie Furay. The group, widely known for the song "For What It's Worth", released three albums and several singles from 1966 to 1968. Their music combined elements of folk music and country music with influences from the British Invasion and psychedelic rock. Like the contemporary band the Byrds, they were key to the early development of folk rock. The band took their name from a steamroller parked outside their house.

Buffalo Springfield formed in Los Angeles in 1966 with Stills (guitar, keyboards, vocals), Martin (drums, vocals), Palmer (bass guitar), Furay (guitar, vocals), and Young (guitar, harmonica, piano, vocals). The band signed to Atlantic Records in 1966 and released their debut single "Nowadays Clancy Can't Even Sing", which became a hit in Los Angeles. The following January, they released the protest song "For What It's Worth", which became their only US top-10 hit and a counterculture anthem. Their second album, Buffalo Springfield Again, marked their progression to psychedelia and hard rock and featured songs such as "Bluebird" and "Mr. Soul".

After Palmer was arrested multiple times and deported, engineer Jim Messina joined the group on bass in 1968, but the group disbanded shortly thereafter. Their third and final album, Last Time Around, was compiled and released shortly after their dissolution. Stephen Stills went on to form the supergroup Crosby, Stills and Nash with David Crosby of the Byrds and Graham Nash of the Hollies. Neil Young launched his solo career and later joined Stills in Crosby, Stills, Nash and Young in 1969. Furay and Messina went on to form the country-rock band Poco. Buffalo Springfield was inducted into the Rock and Roll Hall of Fame in 1997 and briefly reunited for a comeback tour in 2011.

== History ==
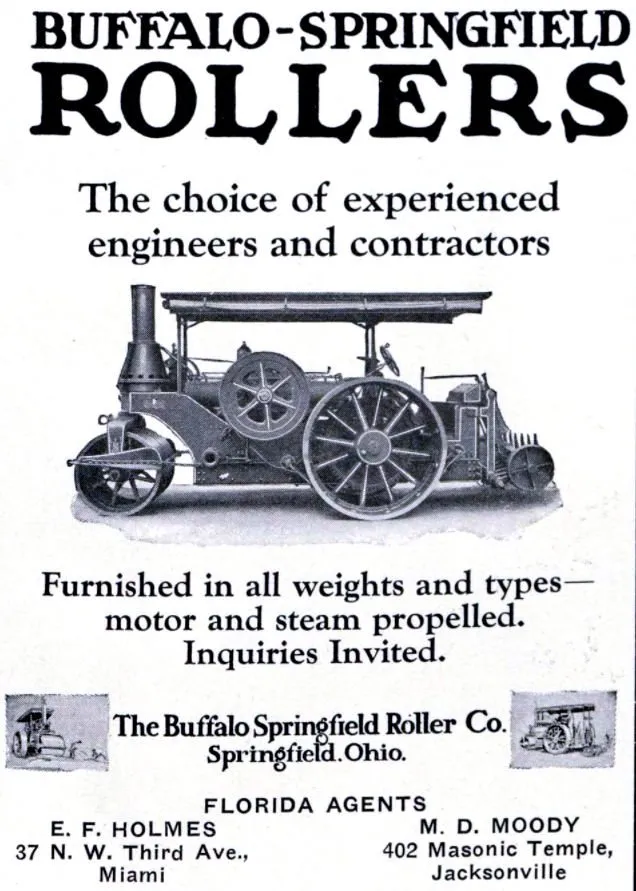
A 1926 ad for the Buffalo-Springfield Roller Company

=== Origins ===
Neil Young and Stephen Stills met in 1965 at the Fourth Dimension in Thunder Bay, Ontario. Young was there with the Squires, a Winnipeg group he had been leading since February 1963, and Stills was on tour with the Company, a spin-off from the Au Go Go Singers. When Stills' band broke up at the end of that tour, he moved to the West Coast, where he worked as a session musician and auditioned unsuccessfully for, among other bands, the Monkees. Told by record producer Barry Friedman that work would be available if he could assemble a band, Stills invited fellow Au Go Go Singers alumnus Richie Furay and former Squires bass player Ken Koblun to come join him in California. Both agreed, although Koblun chose to leave before very long and joined the group 3's a Crowd.

While in Toronto in early 1966, Young met Bruce Palmer, a Canadian who was playing bass for the Mynah Birds. In need of a lead guitarist, Palmer invited Young to join the group, and Young accepted. The Mynah Birds were set to record an album for Motown Records when their singer Ricky James Matthews, later known as Rick James, was tracked down and arrested by the U.S. Navy for being AWOL.

With their record deal cancelled, Young and Palmer pawned the Mynah Birds' musical equipment and bought a 1953 Pontiac hearse, which they drove to Los Angeles. Young and Palmer arrived in Los Angeles, hoping to meet Stephen Stills, who as Young had learned, was living in the city. However, after almost a week of searching clubs and coffeehouses, the pair had been unable to find Stills. Consequently, on April 6, 1966, Young and Palmer decided to leave Los Angeles and drive north to San Francisco. While the two were stuck in traffic on Sunset Boulevard, they were spotted by Stills and Richie Furay, who were heading the other direction down Sunset. Stills and Furay managed to switch lanes and maneuver behind Young's hearse, when the musicians pulled off the road and reunited.

Drummer Dewey Martin, who had played with garage rock group the Standells and with country artists such as Patsy Cline and the Dillards, joined at the suggestion of the Byrds' manager, Jim Dickson. The group's name was taken from a brand of steamroller made by the Buffalo-Springfield Roller Company. The new group debuted on April 11, 1966, at The Troubadour in West Hollywood, five days after the chance encounter on Sunset Boulevard. A few days later, they began a short tour of California as the opening act for the Dillards and the Byrds.

=== Management and first recordings ===
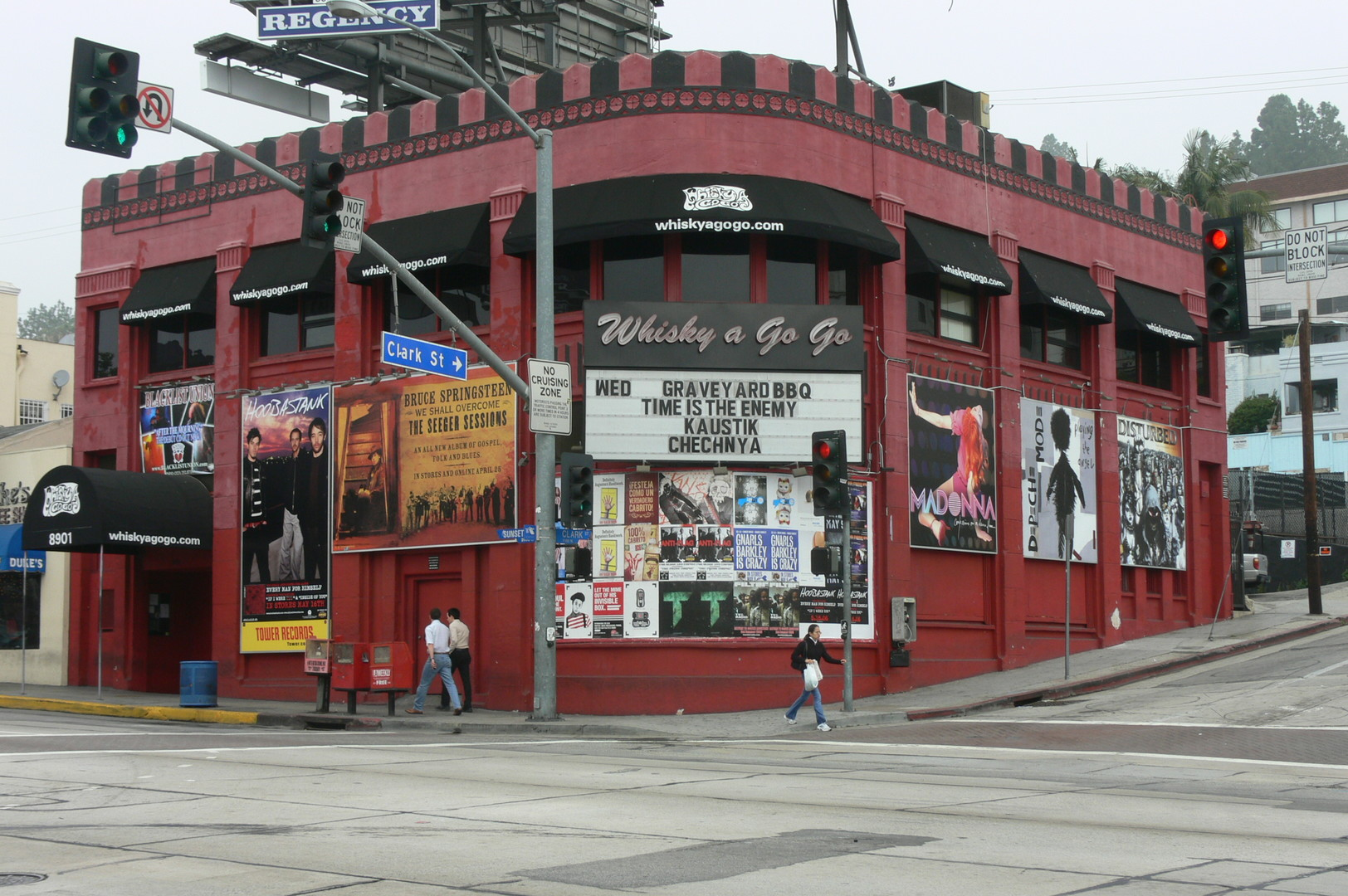
In May 1966, one month after forming, Buffalo Springfield began a multiweek residency at Hollywood's Whisky a Go Go (pictured 2006). Stephen Stills later said: "[T]hat's when we peaked. After then, it was downhill."

Chris Hillman of the Byrds persuaded the owners of the Whisky a Go Go to give Buffalo Springfield an audition, and they essentially became the house band at the Whisky for seven weeks, from May 2 to June 18, 1966. This series of concerts solidified the band's reputation for live performances and attracted interest from a number of record labels. It also brought an invitation from Friedman to Dickie Davis (who had been the Byrds' lighting manager) to become involved in the group's management. In turn, Davis sought advice from Sonny & Cher's management team, Charlie Greene and Brian Stone; unbeknownst to Davis and Friedman, Greene and Stone then aggressively pitched themselves to the band to be their new managers. Friedman was fired, and Davis was made the group's tour manager. Greene and Stone made a deal with Ahmet Ertegun of Atlantic Records for a four-album contract with a $12,000 advance, following a brief bidding war with Elektra Records and Warner Bros. Records, and arranged for the band to start recording at Gold Star Studios in Hollywood.

The first Buffalo Springfield single, "Nowadays Clancy Can't Even Sing", was released in August, but made little impact outside Los Angeles, where it reached the top 25. Young and Stills have long maintained that their own monaural (mono) mix was superior to the stereo mix engineered by Greene and Stone. The band's eponymous album was released by Atlantic subsidiary Atco in mono and in stereo in October 1966. A revamped version issued both in mono and stereo with a different track order was issued in March of the following year.

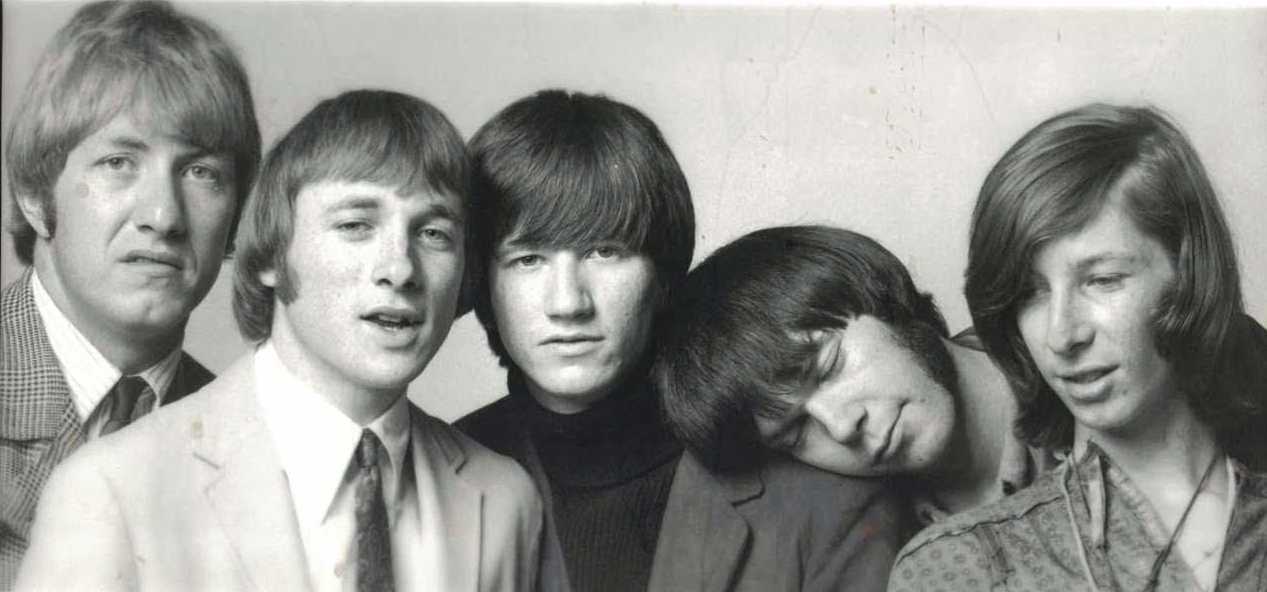
The band in late 1966

In November 1966, Stills composed "For What It's Worth", responding to a protest that had turned violent following the closing of the Pandora's Box nightclub on Sunset Strip. The song was performed on Thanksgiving night at the Whisky a Go Go, recorded within the next few days, and on the air in Los Angeles on radio station KHJ soon afterwards. By March 1967, it was a top-10 hit. Atco took advantage of this momentum by replacing the song "Baby Don't Scold Me" with "For What It's Worth" and re-releasing the album. "For What It's Worth" sold over one million copies and was awarded a gold disc.

=== Lineup changes, arrest, and breakup ===
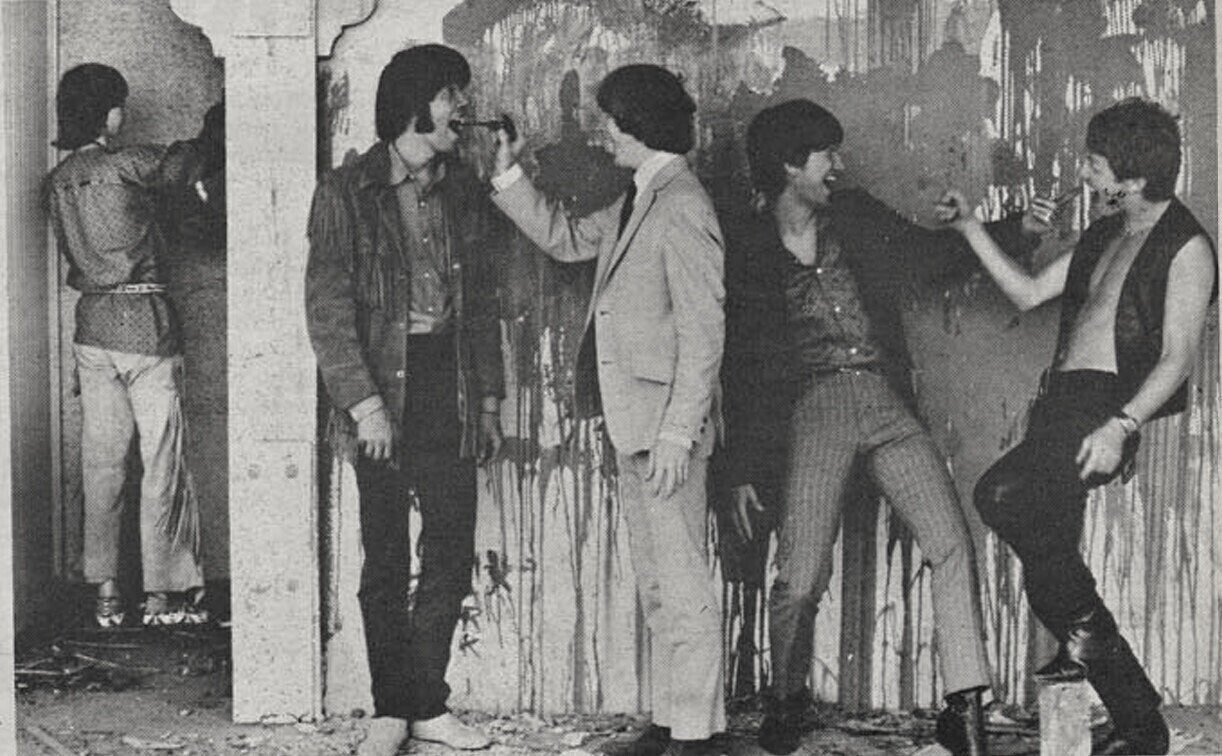
Buffalo Springfield in 1967

In January 1967, Palmer was deported for possession of marijuana, but returned to the group at the beginning of June, while Young was temporarily absent (guitarist Doug Hastings filled in for Young during this period). The band, with David Crosby sitting in, played the Monterey Pop Festival. Young returned in August and the band severed ties with Greene and Stone, then divided its time between playing gigs and finalizing the second album, ultimately titled Buffalo Springfield Again. Produced by Ertegun, it was released in November 1967, including "Mr. Soul", "Rock & Roll Woman", "Bluebird", "Sad Memory", and "Broken Arrow". In October 1967, the band appeared on an episode of detective series Mannix, with Stills later praising their performance as "the best sound we ever got."

The band toured as support for the Beach Boys during early 1968. In January of that year, after Palmer was again deported for drug possession, Jim Messina, who had worked as engineer on the band's second album, was hired as a permanent replacement on bass. During this period, Young began to appear less frequently, and he often left Stills to handle lead guitar parts at concerts. Recording sessions were booked, and all the songs that appeared on the final album were recorded by the end of March, usually with Messina producing.

In the Netflix documentary Echo in the Canyon, Stills related an incident that illustrated the band's problems with law enforcement. The band was hosting a small rehearsal party, attended by Eric Clapton among others, in April 1968. Despite reportedly playing at a comfortable sound level, a police officer arrived after a disturbing-the-peace complaint. During the encounter, the officer smelled marijuana and Stills ran next door to "call lawyers", but in actuality went next door and escaped out the bathroom window. According to Stills, Young was going to chase the police down the street, to which Stills said, "'cause he's Canadian and I guess in Canada you can do that". Ultimately, Young, Furay, and Messina were arrested and sent to the Los Angeles County Jail.

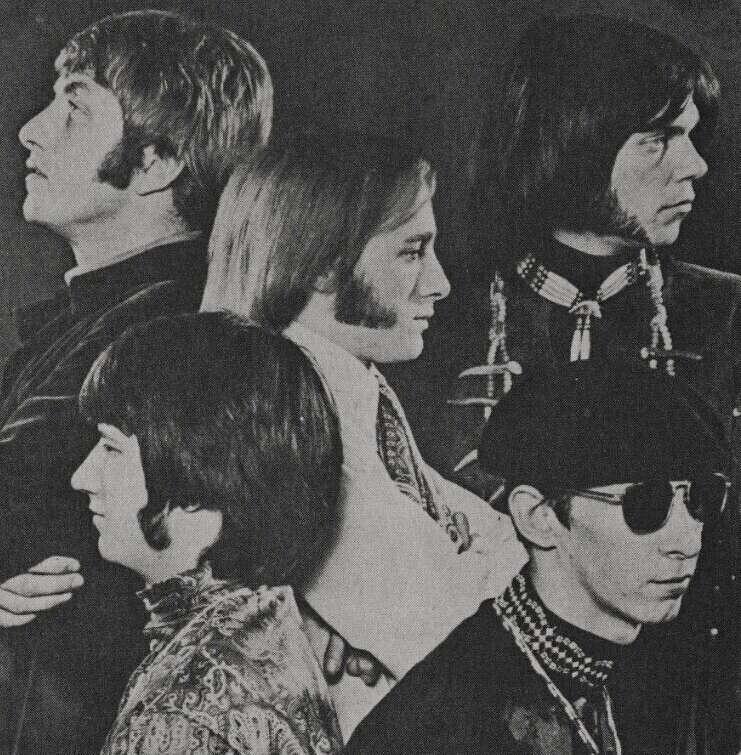
Buffalo Springfield in early 1968

Following a gig at the Long Beach Auditorium on 5 May 1968, the band held a meeting with Ertegun to arrange their breakup. Stills and Furay stayed with Atlantic, while Young moved to Warner Bros. Later, Furay and Messina compiled various tracks recorded between mid-1967 and early 1968 into the third and final studio album, Last Time Around (1968).

== New Buffalo Springfield and reunion attempts ==
Martin formed a new version of Buffalo Springfield in September 1968. Dubbed New Buffalo Springfield, the lineup consisted of guitarists Dave Price (Davy Jones's stand-in with the Monkees), Gary Rowles (son of jazz pianist Jimmy Rowles) who later joined Arthur Lee's Love, bass player Bob Apperson, drummer Don Poncher (also later a member of Love), and horn player Jim Price, who later became a top session musician for Delaney Bramlett, the Rolling Stones, Joe Cocker, and others.

The new band toured extensively and appeared at the highly publicized Holiday Rock Festival in San Francisco on 25–26 December 1968, but soon ran afoul of Stills and Young, who took legal action to prevent Martin from using the band's name. Following an agreement to give up future royalties from Buffalo Springfield's recordings, Martin was allowed to use the name "New Buffalo". He attempted to retrieve his rights in 1974 and though the matter was settled out of court, he felt that he had been mistreated.

In February 1969, Martin and Dave Price formed a second version of New Buffalo with guitarist Bob "BJ" Jones and bass player Randy Fuller, brother of the late Bobby Fuller. The band made some recordings with producer Tom Dowd overseeing, but they were scrapped. Another guitarist, Joey Newman (formerly of Don and the Goodtimes, later of the pioneering prog group Touch), was added in June 1969, but two months later, Martin was fired, and the remaining members carried on as Blue Mountain Eagle. Martin then formed a new group called Medicine Ball, which released a lone album in 1970 for Uni Records. Martin also released solo singles, one for Uni and one for RCA, which did not appear on the album. During the 1970s, he retired from the music industry and became a car mechanic.

In 1984, Bruce Palmer teamed up with Frank Wilks (vocals, guitar), Stan Endersby (guitar), and Alan Prosser (drums) to form the Springfield Band, which became Buffalo Springfield Revisited in 1985 when Dewey Martin was brought up to Toronto to join, and off they went on tour for the next three to four years under this band name (though Martin dropped out by 1987). Neil Young and Stephen Stills gave Buffalo Springfield Revisited permission to tour with that name.

In July 1986, Palmer, Martin, Furay, Young, and Stills gathered at Stills' house, with Buffalo Springfield Revisited keyboardist Harlan Spector, to rehearse for an apparent reunion tour. One of the 1986 rehearsals was video recorded. It was the last time all five original members performed together. Plans for a subsequent reunion tour were abandoned.

By 1990, Bruce Palmer and Frank Wilks had moved to Topanga, California, where Dennis Knicely joined to perform percussion. The following year, they started White Buffalo, along with Dewey Martin and others, then Martin formed the short-lived Buffalo Springfield Again in 1991 with Billy Darnell (guitar), Robin Lambe (bass), and Michael Curtis (vocals, guitar), but Furay issued a cease-and-desist order on Martin in 1992, and Martin retired from music again the following year.

== 2010–2011 reunion ==
On his album Silver & Gold (2000), Young sang of his desire to reform the group and to "see those guys again and give it a shot" in "Buffalo Springfield Again". Palmer (2004) and Martin (2009) later died, preventing a reunion of the original lineup.

Young, Stills, and Furay reunited at the annual Bridge School Benefit concerts on October 23 and 24, 2010, in Mountain View, California. Rolling Stone called the performance "nostalgic, blissful, and moving".

The band reunited for six concerts starting in Oakland on 1 June 2011, followed by dates in Los Angeles and Santa Barbara, before moving on to play the 2011 Bonnaroo Music and Arts Festival in Manchester, Tennessee. The band consisted of Furay, Stills, Young, Rick Rosas, and Joe Vitale. According to Furay and a band spokesman, the group planned a full tour in 2012, but this was delayed because Young was recording two new albums with Crazy Horse. On 27 February 2012, Furay announced that the band was on indefinite hiatus.

== Legacy ==
In 1968, Stills went on to form Crosby, Stills and Nash with David Crosby of the Byrds and Graham Nash of the Hollies. Meanwhile, Furay and Messina formed Poco and Young launched his solo career. In 1969, Young reunited with Stills in Crosby, Stills, Nash and Young. After this, Stills joined with another former Byrd, Chris Hillman (after his stint with the Flying Burrito Brothers), and others to form the group Manassas (1971–1973). Later, Furay joined JD Souther and Chris Hillman to form the Souther-Hillman-Furay Band, and Messina teamed with Kenny Loggins in Loggins & Messina.

In 1982–1983, Palmer was a bassist on Young's album Trans and toured with him in America and Europe, as seen on Neil Young in Berlin, filmed in 1982.

In 1997, Buffalo Springfield was inducted into the Rock and Roll Hall of Fame. A four-disc box set assembled by Young, Buffalo Springfield, was released in 2001. A further box set What's That Sound? Complete Albums Collection was released in 2018 by Rhino Records.

== Personnel ==
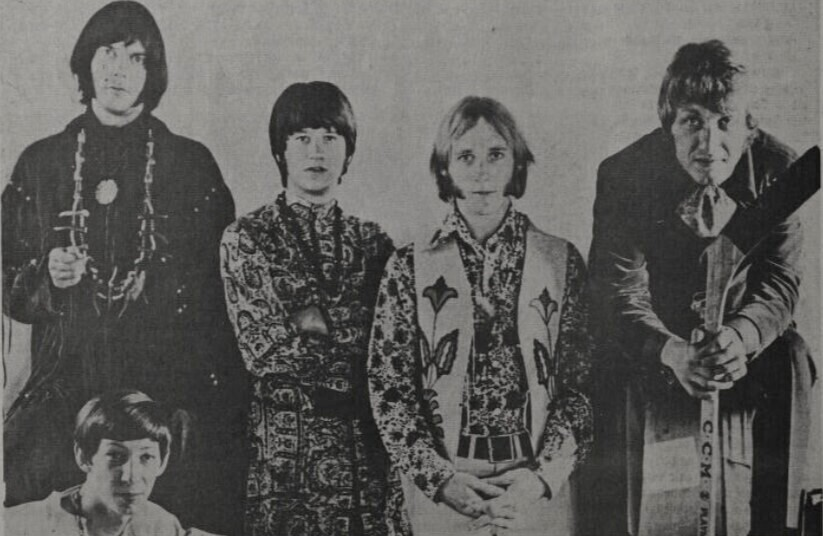
The original members of Buffalo Springfield, October 1967

- Jim Fielder – bass guitar (1966, 1967)
- Richie Furay – guitar, vocals (1966–1968, 2010–2012)
- Bruce Palmer – bass guitar (1966–1968; died 2004)
- Stephen Stills – guitar, keyboards, vocals (1966–1968, 2010–2012)
- Neil Young – guitar, harmonica, piano, vocals (1966–1968, 2010–2012)
- Dewey Martin – drums, vocals (1966–1968; died 2009)
- Ken Forssi – bass guitar (1967; died 1998)
- Ken Koblun – bass guitar (1967)
- Doug Hastings – guitar (1967)
- Jim Messina – bass guitar, vocals (1968)

Additional musicians

- Rick Rosas – bass guitar (2010–2012; died 2014)
- Joe Vitale – drums, vocals (2010–2012)
- Rusty Young – steel guitar on "Last Time Around" (died 2021)

== Discography ==
=== Studio albums ===
Year	Album details	US	FRA
1966	Buffalo Springfield: Released: October 1966; Label: Atco	80	122
1967	Buffalo Springfield Again: Released: October 30, 1967; Label: Atco	44	—
1968	Last Time Around: Released: July 30, 1968; Label: Atco	42	—

=== Compilations ===
Year	Album details	US	Certifications (sales thresholds)
1969	Retrospective: The Best of Buffalo Springfield: Released: February 10, 1969; Label: Atco	42	RIAA: Platinum; BPI: Silver
1973	Buffalo Springfield: Released: November 12, 1973; Label: Atco	104	
2001	Buffalo Springfield (box set): Released: July 17, 2001; Label: Rhino	194	
2018	What's That Sound? Complete Albums Collection (box set): Released: June 29, 2018; Label: Rhino	—	

=== Singles ===
Year	Title	Peak chart positions			Certifications	Album
Year	Title	US	CAN	NZ	Certifications	Album
1966	"Nowadays Clancy Can't Even Sing" b/w "Go and Say Goodbye"	110 (Note: "Bubbling under" does not qualify as actually "making" the Billboard Hot 100 chart.)	75	—		Buffalo Springfield
1966	"Burned" b/w "Everybody's Wrong"	—	—	—		Buffalo Springfield
1967	"For What It's Worth" (Note: Track added to second pressing of debut album and subsequent reissues; does not appear on original release.) b/w "Do I Have to Come Right Out and Say It"	7	5	19	BPI: Platinum; RMNZ: 4× Platinum	Buffalo Springfield
1967	"Bluebird" b/w "Mr. Soul"	58	38	—		Buffalo Springfield Again
1967	"Rock 'n' Roll Woman" b/w "A Child's Claim to Fame"	44	37	—		Buffalo Springfield Again
1967	"Expecting to Fly" b/w "Everydays"	98	41	—		Buffalo Springfield Again
1968	"Uno Mundo" b/w "Merry-Go-Round"	105	—	—		Last Time Around
1968	"Special Care" b/w "Kind Woman"	107	—	—		Last Time Around
1968	"On the Way Home" b/w "Four Days Gone"	82	86	—		Last Time Around
"—" denotes releases that did not chart or were not released in that territory.

== Sources ==
- Priore, Domenic (2015). Riot on Sunset Strip: Rock'n'Roll's Last Stand in Hollywood (Revised ed.). London: Jawbone Press. ISBN 978-1-908279-90-3.
