= For What It's Worth =

1966 single by Buffalo Springfield

Single by Buffalo Springfield
- B-side: "Do I Have to Come Right Out and Say It?"
- Released: December 1966 (Note: "For What It's Worth" was rush-released as a single, but most authors do not specify its release date beyond December 1966. The single debuted on Billboard's Bubbling Under the Hot 100 chart on January 14.)
- Recorded: December 5, 1966
- Studio: Columbia (Hollywood)
- Genre: Folk rock; psychedelic rock
- Length: 2:37
- Label: Atco
- Songwriter: Stephen Stills
- Producers: Charles Greene; Brian Stone

Buffalo Springfield singles chronology
| "Burned" (1966) | "For What It's Worth" (1966) | "Bluebird" (1967) |

Official audio
- "For What It's Worth" on YouTube

"For What It's Worth (Stop, Hey What's That Sound)", often referred to as simply "For What It's Worth", is a song written by Stephen Stills, first recorded by Buffalo Springfield on December 5, 1966, and released as a single on Atco Records in December 1966; it peaked at no. 7 on the Billboard Hot 100 chart in the spring of 1967. The song is often associated with the Vietnam War because students, "flower children" and other young people often clashed with police at anti-war protests and other demonstrations during the counterculture era.

It was later added to the March 1967 second pressing of their first album, Buffalo Springfield. The title was added after the song was written, and does not appear in the lyrics.

In 2004 Rolling Stone magazine ranked the song at number 63 on its list of the 500 Greatest Songs of All Time.

== Background ==
Although "For What It's Worth" is often considered an anti-war song, Stephen Stills was inspired to write the song because of the Sunset Strip curfew riots in Los Angeles in November 1966, a series of early counterculture-era clashes that took place between police and young people on the Sunset Strip in Hollywood, California, the same year Buffalo Springfield had become the house band at the Whisky a Go Go. Local residents and businesses had become annoyed by how crowds of young people going to clubs and music venues along the Strip had caused late-night traffic congestion. In response, they lobbied Los Angeles County to pass local ordinances stopping loitering, and enforced a strict curfew on the Strip after 10 p.m. The young music fans, however, felt the new laws infringed upon their civil rights.

On Saturday, November 12, 1966, fliers were distributed on the Sunset Strip inviting people to join demonstrations later that day. Several of Los Angeles's rock radio stations also announced a rally outside the Pandora's Box club on the corner of Sunset Boulevard and Crescent Heights. That evening, as many as 1,000 young demonstrators, including future celebrities such as Jack Nicholson and Peter Fonda (who was handcuffed by police) gathered to protest against the curfew's enforcement. Although the rallies began peacefully, trouble eventually broke out. The unrest continued the next night, and periodically throughout the rest of November and December, forcing some clubs to shut down within weeks. It was against the background of these civil disturbances that Stills recorded "For What It's Worth" on December 5, 1966.

== Production ==
Stills said in an interview that the name of the song came about when he presented it to the record company executive Ahmet Ertegun (who signed Buffalo Springfield to the Atlantic Records-owned ATCO label). Stills said "I have this song here, for what it's worth, if you want it." Another producer, Charlie Greene, claims that Stills first said the above line to him, but credits Ahmet Ertegun with giving the single the parenthetical subtitle "Stop, Hey What's That Sound" so that the song would be more easily recognized.

The song was recorded on December 5, 1966, at Columbia Studios, Hollywood. Tom Dowd claimed he mixed the song at Atlantic's studio in New York, though this has been disputed. Dowd did take part in the production of Cher's version of the song in 1969. One of the most recognizable elements of the song is Neil Young's use of guitar harmonics.

== Releases and charts ==
While memories of the November riots were still fresh, the group and Ertegun pushed for a rush-release of "For What It's Worth". On December 10, 1966, five days after the song was recorded, local Top 40 radio station KHJ began playing the single. It first appeared on the station's "Boss 30" chart on December 28, 1966, at number 26, and was followed by rival KRLA on January 14, 1967, where the single entered its "Top 40 Requests" at number eight. Also on January 14, Billboard magazine identified it as a "regional breakout" and the single appeared on its Bubbling Under the Hot 100 chart. Two weeks later, it debuted at number 90 on the Billboard Hot 100, where it peaked at number seven on March 25 and remained on the chart for a total of fifteen weeks. Although the single did not reach the charts in the U.K., the British Phonographic Industry (BPI) certified a 2004 release by Warner Music as platinum (sales and streams of 600,000) in 2023.

1967 singles charts
| Chart | Peak | Ref(s) |
|---|---|---|
| Canada RPM 100 | 5 | |
| U.S. Billboard Hot 100 | 7 | |
| U.S. Cash Box Top 100 | 7 | |
| U.S. Record World Top 100 | 8 | |

1967 year-end charts
| Chart | Rank | Ref(s) |
|---|---|---|
| Canada RPM Top Singles | 72 | |
| U.S. Billboard Hot 100 | 27 | |
| U.S. Cash Box Top 100 | 52 | |

To capitalize on the single's success, Atco was pushing for a follow-up album that featured the song. It began printing album jackets with the title Stampede, but the group did not have enough songs for a new LP. Instead, Atco reissued their debut album and added Stills's song as the opening track. It eventually reached number 80 on Billboard's Top LPs chart. As one of Buffalo Springfield's best-known songs, it is included on several of the group's anthologies, such as Retrospective: The Best of Buffalo Springfield (1969), the Buffalo Springfield box set (2001), and What's That Sound? Complete Albums Collection (2018).

== Certifications ==
Certifications for "For What It's Worth"
| Region | Certification | Certified units/sales |
|---|---|---|
| Denmark (IFPI Danmark) | Gold | 45,000^{‡} |
| New Zealand (RMNZ) | 4× Platinum | 120,000^{‡} |
| Italy (FIMI) | Gold | 25,000^{‡} |
| Spain (Promusicae) | Gold | 30,000^{‡} |
| United Kingdom (BPI) | Platinum | 600,000^{‡} |
^{‡} Sales+streaming figures based on certification alone.

== Critical commentary and legacy ==
Cash Box said the single is a "throbbing, infectious protester circling 'round the current happenings in Cal."

"For What It's Worth" quickly became a well-known protest song. In 2006, when interviewed on Tom Kent's radio show Into the '70s, Stills pointed out that many people think the song is about the Kent State shootings of 1970, even though its release predates that event by over three years. Neil Young—Stills's bandmate in both Buffalo Springfield and Crosby, Stills, Nash & Young (CSNY)—would later write "Ohio" in response to the events at Kent State.

An all-star version of "For What It's Worth", with Tom Petty and others, was played at Buffalo Springfield's induction into the Rock and Roll Hall of Fame in 1997; Neil Young did not attend the event.

The song is a staple of period piece films about 1960s America and the Vietnam War, such as Forrest Gump, and often used as a common shorthand to quickly establish the atmosphere of 1960s counterculture movement and protests.

The song appears in the intro to the 2005 film Lord of War, showing the lifecycle of a rifle cartridge, from manufacture to firing.

On August 17, 2020, Billy Porter sang "For What It's Worth" for the 2020 Democratic National Convention backed by Stephen Stills on guitar, a nod to the song's resurgent use in the summer 2020 American protests.

In 2000, the 1966 recording of "For What It's Worth" by Buffalo Springfield on ATCO Records was inducted into the Grammy Hall of Fame. The HOF lists the ATCO date as 1967.

Dawes, alongside Stephen Stills and Mike Campbell performed the song on January 30, 2025 at Kia Forum in Inglewood, California for FireAid to help with relief efforts for the January 2025 Southern California wildfires.

In June 2026, CBS News included the song in its list of the 250 essential American songs of the past 250 years.

== Personnel ==
Personnel taken from Buffalo Springfield liner notes.

- Stephen Stills – lead vocals, lead guitar
- Neil Young – lead guitar
- Richie Furay – rhythm guitar, backing vocals
- Bruce Palmer – bass guitar
- Dewey Martin – drums, backing vocals

== Covers and sampling ==
"For What It's Worth" has been covered, sampled, and referenced in numerous musical performances. Versions include those by The Staple Singers (US #66 in 1967, CAN #46 in 1967), Art (1967 single from Supernatural Fairy Tales), King Curtis (in the 1967 album King Sized Soul), Ken Lyon & Tombstone, Rush, Cher, the Candyskins, Oui 3 (UK #28), Queensrÿche (on their album Take Cover), The Muppets (episode 221, 1978), Miriam Makeba (on her album Keep Me in Mind), Ozzy Osbourne and (həd) ^{p.e.} (retitled Children). Cher's 1969 cover did not make the Billboard Hot 100 but it did reach #88 in Canada. AllMusic retrospectively called her version "mature [and] forceful".

Sergio Mendes and Brasil '66 recorded a version of this song. It reached #10 in the Adult Contemporary Music Chart on September 19, 1970.

David Cassidy recorded an extended live version for his 1974 album Cassidy Live! (Bell Records, UK #9; recorded live in Great Britain in May 1974).

The hip-hop group Public Enemy sampled "For What It's Worth" on their 1998 song "He Got Game", which featured Stephen Stills reprising his vocal performance from the original song. Oui 3 adapted the song for their 1993 debut single of the same name, which reached number 26 in the UK chart. In 2017, Haley Reinhart released a cover of the song as the third single from her third studio album, What's That Sound? In 2018, the Lone Bellow released a cover of the song as a single. In 2021, Los Lobos covered the song on their tribute to Los Angeles: Native Sons. In 2022 Stevie Nicks released a cover of it as well, not to be confused with her 2011 song of the same name. In 2024, Hootie & the Blowfish also released their own cover as single.

== See also ==
- List of 1960s one-hit wonders in the United States
- Protest songs in the United States
