= Buffalo Springfield (album) =

Studio album by Buffalo Springfield
- Released: c. November 1966
- Recorded: July 18 – September 11, 1966
- Studio: Gold Star and Columbia, Hollywood
- Genre: Folk rock; pop
- Length: 32:54
- Label: Atco
- Producer: Charles Greene; Brian Stone

Buffalo Springfield chronology
Buffalo Springfield (1966)	Buffalo Springfield Again (1967)

Singles from Buffalo Springfield
- 1. "Nowadays Clancy Can't Even Sing" / "Go and Say Goodbye" Released: August 1966; 2. "Burned" / "Everybody's Wrong" Released: November 1966; 3. "For What It's Worth" / "Do I Have to Come Right Out and Say It?" Released: December 1966

Buffalo Springfield is the debut album by the Canadian-American folk-rock band Buffalo Springfield. Released by Atco Records around November 1966, (Note: An advertisement in Billboard on October 22, 1966, indicates the album was due for release that month, but the New York Daily News reported that the band planned to "uncork" their album in New York on November 9. In his band biography, John Einarson writes the album was "[r]ushed out by late November".) the songs on the album were written by the band members Stephen Stills and Neil Young and produced by Charles Greene and Brian Stone. The tracks were recorded by July 18 to September 11, 1966, in Gold Star Studios and CBS Columbia Square, based in Hollywood, Los Angeles.

Two singles were originally released for the album: "Nowadays Clancy Can't Even Sing" (backed with "Go and Say Goodbye") and "Burned" (backed with "Everybody's Wrong"). Most subsequent pressings of the album from March 1967 onward replaced the track "Baby Don't Scold Me" with the standalone single "For What It's Worth", which was ascending the US charts at the time. The single (backed with "Do I Have to Come Right Out and Say It?") eventually peaked at number 7 on the Hot 100, while the album reached number 80 on the Billboard Top Pop Albums chart.

== Background and content ==
Buffalo Springfield were formed in early 1966, playing their first gig at The Troubadour club in Hollywood in April of that year. An initial single that appeared on this album, Young's "Nowadays Clancy Can't Even Sing", sung by Richie Furay and recorded on July 18, 1966, failed to reach the national charts, but made the Top 40 locally in Los Angeles during August. This album was mostly recorded in July, August and September of 1966 at Gold Star Studios where Phil Spector created his "Wall of Sound" and Brian Wilson produced recordings by the Beach Boys. Young sings lead on only two of his five compositions, Furay singing lead on the other three.

The album was produced by the group's managers, Charles Greene and Brian Stone, both of whom had minimal experience as record producers. The group was reportedly unhappy with the sound of the album, feeling that it did not reflect the intensity of their live shows. The band asked Atco for time to re-record the album, but not wanting to miss the Christmas holiday season the label insisted that the record be released as it was.

Buffalo Springfield was originally released in both mono and stereo versions as Atco 33-200 and SD 33-200, respectively. The back cover contained band profiles of each member in the mode of those for Tiger Beat. Recorded the day the LP was released and issued soon after, the band's new single by Stills "For What It's Worth" became a national hit, making the top ten on the Billboard Hot 100 singles chart in March 1967. For the second pressing of March 6, 1967, the album was reissued as Atco SD 33-200A with the hit as the lead track, dropping "Baby Don't Scold Me" and slightly reconfiguring the running order. "Baby Don't Scold Me" has never been reissued in stereo; all compact disc releases feature only the mono mix of this track.

The album was remastered in HDCD and reissued on June 24, 1997, with two versions on one disc, the mono tracks from Atco 33-200 first with the stereo tracks from SD 33-200A following. Not contained were the stereo mix of "Baby Don't Scold Me" from Atco SD 33-200 or the mono mix of "For What It's Worth" from Atco 33-200A. "Burned" has also never been issued in stereo.

The recording sessions took place at Gold Star Studios in Los Angeles from July 18 to September 11, 1966, with "For What It's Worth" recorded at Columbia Studios in Los Angeles on December 5, 1966.

== Critical reception ==
Professional ratings
Review scores
Source	Rating
AllMusic	4/5 stars
The Encyclopedia of Popular Music	4/5 stars
The Rolling Stone Record Guide	3/5 stars

The album was met with positive reception when it released. AllMusic and The Encyclopedia of Popular Music (the latter written by Colin Larkin) would later give the album four out of five stars, while The Rolling Stone Album Guide would give the album three out of five stars. Cash Box said that "Burned" has a "slick, mid-tempo rock arrangement that could catch on big" and mentioned how "Nowadays Clancy Can't Even Sing" was a "pulsating, folk-ish item with some inventive unexpected melodic changes."

== Track listing ==
=== Original release ===
Side one
No.	Title	Writer(s)	Lead singer(s)	Length
1.	"Go and Say Goodbye" (July 18, 1966)	Stephen Stills	Stills and Richie Furay	2:20
2.	"Sit Down, I Think I Love You" (August 1966)	Stills	Stills and Furay	2:32
3.	"Leave" (August 1966)	Stills	Stills and Furay	2:42
4.	"Nowadays Clancy Can't Even Sing" (July 18, 1966)	Neil Young	Furay	3:25
5.	"Hot Dusty Roads" (August 1966)	Stills	Stills	2:50
6.	"Everybody's Wrong" (August 1966)	Stills	Stills and Furay	2:23

Side two
No.	Title	Writer(s)	Lead singer(s)	Length
1.	"Flying on the Ground Is Wrong" (September 10, 1966)	Young	Furay	2:40
2.	"Burned" (August 1966)	Young	Young	2:16
3.	"Do I Have to Come Right Out and Say It" (August 1966)	Young	Furay	3:01
4.	"Baby Don't Scold Me" (August 1966)	Stills	Stills and Furay	3:04
5.	"Out of My Mind" (August 1966)	Young	Young	3:05
6.	"Pay the Price" (August 1966)	Stills	Stills	2:36

=== March 1967 release ===
Side one
No.	Title	Writer(s)	Lead singer(s)	Length
1.	"For What It's Worth" (December 5)	Stills	Stills	2:40
2.	"Go and Say Goodbye" (July 18)	Stills	Stills and Furay	2:20
3.	"Sit Down, I Think I Love You" (August)	Stills	Stills and Furay	2:30
4.	"Nowadays Clancy Can't Even Sing" (July 18)	Young	Furay	3:24
5.	"Hot Dusty Roads" (August)	Stills	Stills	2:47
6.	"Everybody's Wrong" (August)	Stills	Stills and Furay	2:25

Side two
No.	Title	Writer(s)	Lead singer(s)	Length
1.	"Flying on the Ground Is Wrong" (September 10)	Young	Furay	2:40
2.	"Burned" (August)	Young	Young	2:15
3.	"Do I Have to Come Right Out and Say It" (August)	Young	Furay	3:04
4.	"Leave" (August)	Stills	Stills and Furay	2:42
5.	"Out of My Mind" (August)	Young	Young	3:06
6.	"Pay the Price" (August)	Stills	Stills	2:36

== Personnel ==
Buffalo Springfield

- Stephen Stills – vocals, lead guitar, keyboards
- Neil Young – vocals, lead guitar; harmonica on "Nowadays Clancy Can't Even Sing;" piano on "Burned" and "Do I Have to Come Right Out and Say It"
- Richie Furay – vocals, rhythm guitar
- Bruce Palmer – bass guitar
- Dewey Martin – drums, backing vocals on "For What It's Worth"

Production personnel

- Charles Greene, Brian Stone – producers, stereo mix
- Tom May, Doc Siegel, James Hilton, Stan Ross – engineers
- Sandy Dvore – design
- Henry Diltz, Ivan Nagy – photography
- Tim Mulligan – HDCD digital mastering
- John Nowland, Pflash Pflaumer – analog to digital transfers

== Charts ==
Album - (United States)
Year	Chart	Position
1967	Billboard Pop Albums	80
1967	Cashbox Albums Charts	54
1967	Record World Album Charts	54

Singles - Billboard (United States)
Year	Single	Chart	Position
August 1966	"Nowadays Clancy Can't Even Sing" / "Go And Say Goodbye"	U.S. Billboard Hot 100	110
November 1966	"Burned" / "Everybody's Wrong"	-	-
January 1967	"For What It's Worth (Stop, Hey What's That Sound)" / "Do I Have To Come Right Out And Say It"	U.S. Billboard Hot 100	7
