= Sit Down, I Think I Love You =

Song of Buffalo Springfield, The Mojo Men and The Executives

"Sit Down, I Think I Love You" is a 1966 song composed by American singer-songwriter Stephen Stills and originally recorded by American-Canadian rock band Buffalo Springfield. A cover version by The Mojo Men was released as a single in 1967 and reached the U.S. Top 40. Also that year, Australian band The Executives charted in their home country with their version of the song.

== Buffalo Springfield version ==
"Sit Down, I Think I Love You"

Song by Buffalo Springfield

from the album Buffalo Springfield
- Released: December 5, 1966
- Genre: Folk rock; pop
- Length: 2:32
- Label: Atco
- Songwriter: Stephen Stills

Stephen Stills wrote "Sit Down, I Think I Love You" as a fairly direct love song. It was written prior to the formation of Buffalo Springfield, when Stills had just settled in Los Angeles and had begun writing songs that he felt "were personal statements and had something to say." The song was included on Buffalo Springfield's eponymous debut album, but because Stills had sold the song's publishing rights, he never received any writer's royalties. Allmusic's Matthew Greenwald said the song "showcases Stills' already refined pop moxie and melodic instinct, crossed with a strong folk flavoring." Dave Swanson of Ultimate Classic Rock described it as "pristine folk-rock with a great garage band feel" and ranked it as the ninth best song by Buffalo Springfield.

== The Mojo Men version ==
"Sit Down, I Think I Love You"

Single by The Mojo Men
- B-side: "Don't Leave Me Crying Like Before"
- Released: December 1966
- Genre: Baroque pop
- Length: 2:18
- Label: Reprise
- Songwriter: Stephen Stills

The Mojo Men singles chronology
"She's My Baby" (1966)	"Sit Down, I Think I Love You" (1966)	"Me About You" (1967)

San Francisco-based group The Mojo Men released a cover version of "Sit Down, I Think I Love You" as a single in early 1967. Arranged by Van Dyke Parks, the song was the band's biggest hit in the United States, peaking at number 36 on the Billboard Hot 100 chart. In Canada, it reached number 26 on RPM magazine's singles chart.

Greenwald said The Mojo Men's recording "transformed the song into a near-Mamas & Papas graft, complete with counterpoint vocals and a warm feeling. An odd and wide variety of instruments (from mandolins, Dobro, to multiple keyboards) add great texture to the melody, creating one of the great 'lost' masterpieces of the era." The song was included on the seminal 1972 Nuggets: Original Artyfacts from the First Psychedelic Era, 1965–1968 garage rock compilation album.

=== Chart performance ===
Chart (1967)	Peak position
Canadian Singles Chart	26
U.S. Billboard Hot 100	36
U.S. Cash Box Top 100	39

== The Executives version ==
Australian pop group The Executives released their cover of "Sit Down, I Love You" as a single in 1967. It peaked at number 4 in Sydney, 13 in Brisbane, and 28 on the Go-Set national chart.
