= Dewey Martin (musician) =

American drummer (1940–2009)

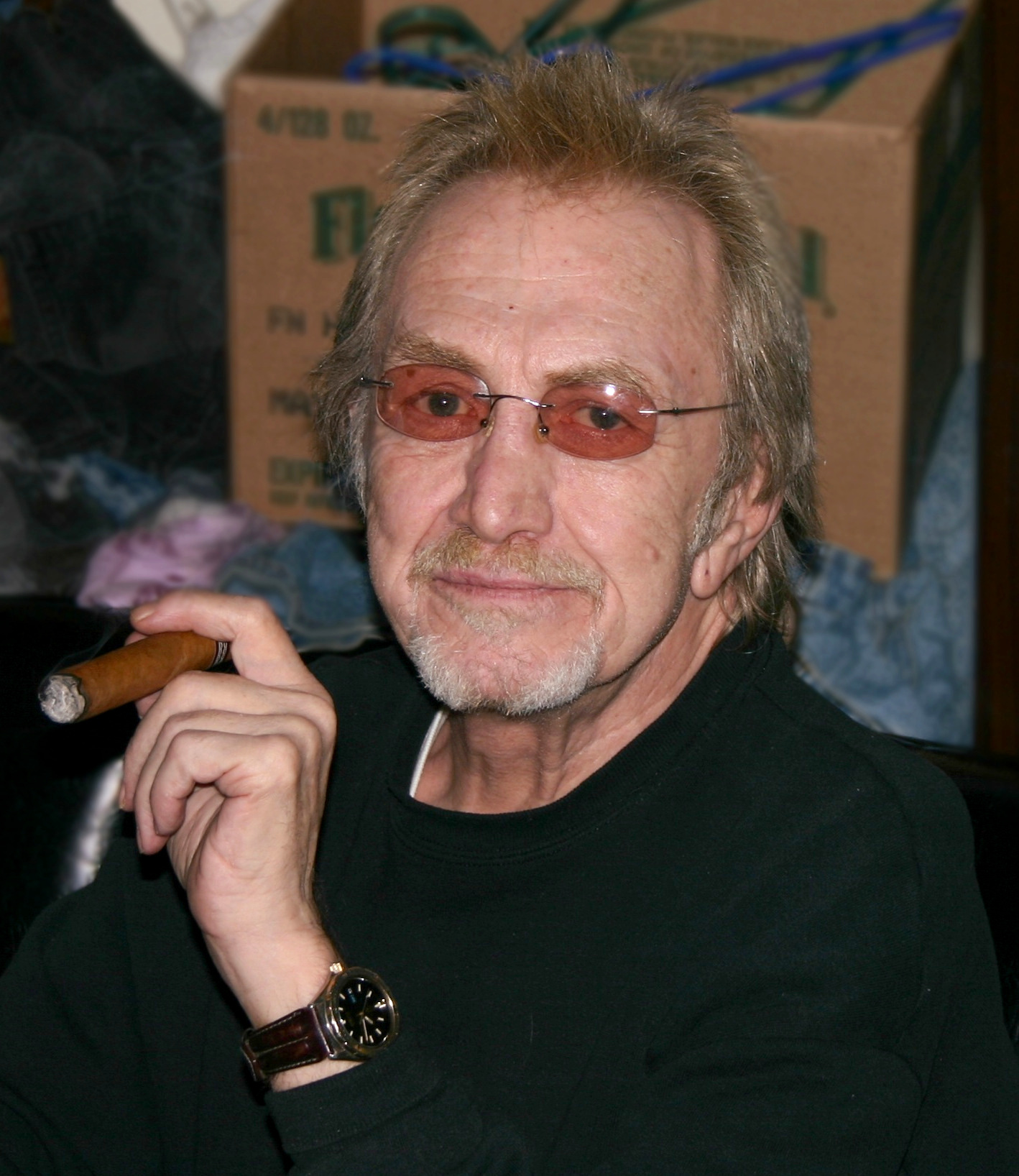
- Martin in 2004

Background information
- Born: Walter Milton Dwayne Midkiff; September 30, 1940; Chesterville, Ontario, Canada
- Died: February 1, 2009 (aged 68) Van Nuys, California, U.S.
- Genres: Rock
- Instruments: Drums; vocals
- Years active: 1960s–2009
- Label: Atlantic Records

Dewey Martin (born Walter Milton Dwayne Midkiff, September 30, 1940 – February 1, 2009) was a Canadian rock drummer, best known for his work with Buffalo Springfield, for which he was inducted into the Rock and Roll Hall of Fame in 1997.

== Career ==
Dewey Martin was born in Chesterville, Ontario, Canada in 1940. He was raised there and in the surrounding Smiths Falls, Ontario and Ottawa, Ontario areas.

=== Buffalo Springfield ===
Martin became the last member to join the group at its founding. Along with Stephen Stills and Richie Furay, he was one of only three musicians to stay with the group from its inception in April 1966 to its disbandment on May 5, 1968. During his time with the group Martin also did session work for The Monkees.

In concert he sang covers of Wilson Pickett's "In The Midnight Hour" and Richie Furay's "Nobody's Fool" and "Good Time Boy." The latter appeared on the band's second album, Buffalo Springfield Again. He also sang Neil Young's "Mr. Soul" as the introduction to Young's "Broken Arrow" on the same album. Martin also sang backing vocals on the band's biggest hit, Stephen Stills's classic political rock anthem "For What It's Worth."

=== New Buffalo Springfield ===
When the original band broke up Martin formed a new version in September 1968. Dubbed "New Buffalo Springfield", the lineup comprised guitarists Dave Price (Davy Jones' stand-in in The Monkees) and Gary Rowles (son of jazz pianist Jimmy Rowles); bass player Bob Apperson; drummer Don Poncher; and horn player Jim Price.

The new band toured extensively but Stephen Stills and Neil Young took legal action to prevent Martin from using the band's name.

In February 1969, Martin and Dave Price formed a second version of New Buffalo Springfield with guitarist Bob "BJ" Jones and bass player Randy Fuller, brother of Bobby Fuller. The band did some tentative recordings with producer Tom Dowd overseeing but they were scrapped. They performed live at the Easter Rock Festival in Fort Lauderdale, FL on April 1, 1969.

The second line up was expanded with another guitarist Joey Newman in June 1969, but two months later Martin was fired and the remaining members carried on as Blue Mountain Eagle.

=== Medicine Ball ===
In September 1969 Martin signed a solo deal with Uni Records and recorded a cover of the country favourite, "Jambalaya" with session ace and TCB Band member James Burton on guitar. It was released as a single with Martin's own composition "Ala-Bam" on the b-side. An album, "Dewey Martin's Medicine Ball", was released in August 1970 and featured steel guitarist Buddy Emmons and former Buffalo Springfield bass player Bruce Palmer.

Martin then recorded five tracks with the TCB Band for RCA. Two of the songs – a cover of Alan O'Day's "Caress Me Pretty Music" and a cover of Joe Cocker and Chris Stainton's "There Must Be A Reason" were put out as a single in early 1971. After producing an album for Truk in late 1971, Martin retired from the music industry to become a car mechanic. By the mid-1970s he was back in hometown Ottawa, living with his mother.

=== Eighties revival and beyond ===
During the mid-1980s Martin briefly worked with Pink Slip and the Meisner-Roberts Band. In the late 80's while touring with Roberts and Meisner, Martin told concert producer/musician Raven Alan St. John he had been robbed by hotel maids at the Sierra Royale Suites and couldn't pay for the extra nights. The hotel comped him for two more nights and fired one maid.

He also played with Buffalo Springfield Revisited, the band formed by original bass player, Bruce Palmer. During the early 1990s Martin revived the mantle under the name "Buffalo Springfield Again" with Bruce Palmer and Joe Dickinson (father of singer Laura Dickinson) for further live work but retired around 1998.

In 1997 Martin invented and filed a patent application for a drum with a three-part rim that could be used to make three different rimshot sounds. He received patent 5,834,667 on this drum on Nov 10, 1998; the patent was issued to him under his legal name, Walter M.D. Midkiff. In 1997 Martin was inducted into the Rock and Roll Hall of Fame as a member of Buffalo Springfield.

== Death ==
Martin died on February 1, 2009. His body was found the next day by a roommate in his Van Nuys apartment. Longtime friend Lisa Lenes said Martin had health problems in previous years, and she believed he died of natural causes. He was 68.
