= Bruce Palmer =

Canadian bassist (1946–2004)

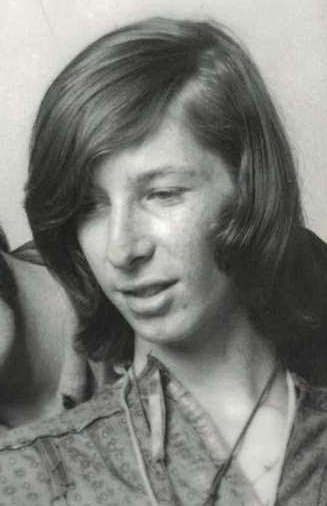
- Palmer with Buffalo Springfield in 1966

Background information
- Born: Bruce Clifford Palmer; September 9, 1946; Liverpool, Nova Scotia, Canada
- Died: October 1, 2004 (aged 58) Belleville, Ontario, Canada
- Genre: Folk rock
- Occupation: Bassist
- Years active: 1963–1971, 1977, 1982–1986
- Formerly of: Buffalo Springfield, The Mynah Birds, Robbie Lane & The Disciples, The Sparrows

Bruce Palmer (September 9, 1946 – October 1, 2004) was a Canadian musician best known as the bassist in the folk rock band Buffalo Springfield, who were inducted into the Rock and Roll Hall of Fame in 1997.

== Early years ==
Palmer was born in Liverpool, Nova Scotia, later moving with his family to Toronto, Ontario, where in the early 1960s he began pursuing a musical career. He started out playing with Robbie Lane and the Disciples, then graduated to a local, otherwise all-black group fronted by Billy Clarkson. Next came British invasion-inspired Jack London & The Sparrows (which, after Palmer left, evolved into Steppenwolf).

In early 1965, he left to join The Mynah Birds where he first met Neil Young who was playing lead guitar in the band. The Mynah Birds, fronted by future funk legend Rick James, had a bright future and were signed to the prestigious Motown Records to do some demo recordings before it was discovered that James was actually in Toronto to avoid serving in Vietnam with the United States Navy, from which he had gone AWOL.

A planned single, "It's My Time" b/w "Go On and Cry", was withdrawn just prior to its scheduled release by Motown. Both sides of this single were included in the 2006 box set The Complete Motown Singles, Vol. 6: 1966, released in a limited edition of 6000 by Universal label Hip-O-Select, marking the first time any of the 1966 Motown recordings by the Mynah Birds had seen the light of day.

The group was forced to disband, and Young and Palmer drove Young's hearse to Los Angeles in the hope of meeting Stephen Stills, a journeyman folk musician with whom Young had played briefly in Canada two years earlier. Within two days of arriving in Los Angeles, Young and Palmer were driving on Sunset Boulevard and Stills was coming in the opposite direction. When Stills saw the Ontario licence plates, he turned around and pursued the hearse, pulled up beside them and realized who they were. Shortly after, the whole crew pulled into a carpark and introduced themselves. Thus they became the band Buffalo Springfield.

== With Buffalo Springfield ==
Young, Palmer, and Stills, along with fellow-Canadian Dewey Martin on drums and Richie Furay on rhythm guitar and vocals, soon formed Buffalo Springfield. The band only had one major national hit, "For What It's Worth" (written and sung by Stills). In Los Angeles their popularity was rivaled only by The Byrds and The Doors. A number of other songs achieved mild prominence, such as "Blue Bird," "Mr Soul", "Expecting to Fly", "Broken Arrow", "Down to the Wire", "Flying On the Ground Is Wrong", "Go and Say Goodbye", "Rock & Roll Woman", "Out of My Mind", "Sit Down, I Think I Love You", and "On the Way Home".

Palmer was arrested on numerous occasions for drug possession. These legal problems, compounded by his predilection to stay home reading mystical texts, led to his being shunned by most of the group. Another arrest led to his deportation from the U.S. in January 1967. Palmer was replaced in the band by a rotating group of bassists that included Jim Fielder and Ken Koblun. Shortly thereafter, Young left the group due to tensions with Stills, and Buffalo Springfield played its most prominent concert at the hugely influential Monterey Pop Festival in June 1967 with Doug Hastings and David Crosby filling in for Young. During his time back in Toronto between January and May 1967, Palmer gigged briefly with the local band The Heavenly Government.

In late May, Palmer returned to the U.S. disguised as a businessman, in a suit and tie with his hair cut short, and rejoined the band (Young eventually returned as well). However, the group had lost trust in Palmer and continued to rely on session players despite his return. Palmer continued to rack up a lengthy arrest record, which included another drug possession bust and driving without a licence. In January 1968, Palmer was removed from the band and officially replaced by Jim Messina. He was deported again in March. After embarking on a tour opening for the Beach Boys, Buffalo Springfield disbanded on May 5, 1968, after a final concert at the Long Beach Sports Arena.

== Later years ==
Palmer resurfaced in the summer of 1969 for two weeks as the bassist for Crosby, Stills, Nash & Young but was soon replaced by Motown prodigy Greg Reeves. In Toronto, Palmer gigged briefly with Luke & The Apostles in early 1970. In February 1970, he illegally entered the U.S. again, because his attorney said if he did not re-enter and give a deposition in a civil suit, he would face financial ruin. The attorney lost track of Palmer and hired an investigator to find him. He was caught and arrested a year later in January 1971, in Los Angeles. He was deported for the final time in 1972.

In 1970, Palmer released his lone solo record, The Cycle Is Complete, on Verve Records. Primarily consisting of three long jams, "Alpha-Omega-Apocalypse", "Oxo", and "Calm Before the Storm" (with an "Interlude" between the first two numbers), the album featured Palmer playing with the remnants of fellow L.A. psychedelic group Kaleidoscope, Toronto keyboard player Ed Roth and Rick James contributing jazzy scat vocals. The record has been described as a jazzier version of Skip Spence's Oar or Syd Barrett's two solo records – an aural, drug-induced nervous breakdown. Others consider it reflective and musically intricate. Ill-suited for radio play and too abstract to garner a wide audience, the album was a commercial disaster, and Palmer seemingly retired from music.

In 1977, Palmer joined former Kensington Market singer/guitarist Keith McKie and lead guitarist Stan Endersby (formerly of local bands, The Just Us, and Mapleoak) in the Toronto-based group Village for local gigs.

In 1982–1983, Palmer was bassist in Neil Young's Trans Band, and playing a mixture of Young classics and electronica-infused material to audiences throughout America and Europe, as seen on Neil Young in Berlin, filmed in 1982.

Palmer was inducted with his Buffalo Springfield bandmates into the Rock and Roll Hall of Fame in 1997.

== Personal life and death ==
Palmer was married three times. He had three children.

He died of a heart attack on October 1, 2004, in Belleville, Ontario, at the age of 58.

== Discography ==
- The Cycle Is Complete (1970, Verve Forecast)
