= Harvest (Neil Young song) =

Song by Neil Young

from the album Harvest
- Released: February 1, 1972
- Recorded: April 4, 1971
- Studio: Quadrafonic Sound Studios, Nashville
- Genre: Country rock
- Length: 3:03
- Label: Reprise
- Songwriter: Neil Young
- Producers: Elliot Mazer; Neil Young

"Harvest" is a song written by Neil Young that was the title song of his 1972 album Harvest.

== Music and lyrics ==
"Harvest" is a slow country dance tune. It has a slow tempo, and Uncut magazine contributor Graeme Thomson describes it as having a "calm, strangely hypnotic quality." Young is backed on the song by the Stray Gators, with the addition of John Harris on piano. The piano plays a prominent role in the instrumentation. Sound on Sound editor Sam Inglis describes the drumming as "minimalist," with drummer Kenny Buttrey using only one hand and playing only the snare drum and bass drum.

The lyrics of "Harvest" are obscure. Music critic Johnny Rogan describes the lyrics as presenting rhetorical questions about a relationship with a woman. To Rogan, the singer wonders how much love he will receive from the relationship and the extent to which we will be able to accept – or harvest – that love. Music journalist Nigel Williamson regards the lyrics as reflecting Young's "inability to accept happiness at face value." Williamson sees the refrain of "Dream up, dream up/Let me fill your cup" as another reference to the "harvest" in the title. Another interpretation of the lyrics is that they reflect the passage of time. Yet another interpretation is that the lyrics are about "maturing out of adolescence." Young biographer Jimmy McDonough interprets lyrics such as "Did she wake you up to tell you that/It was only a change of plan" as referring to his then mother-in-law's previous suicide attempts. Inglis also interprets the line "Did I see you down in a young girl's town/With your mother in so much pain" as referring to this situation. Young biographer David Downing feels that the song works like a dream, being "so full of recognition, yet so short on sense."

Young has stated that this song, as well as "Out on the Weekend" and "Heart of Gold" from the same album, were inspired by his then blossoming love for actress Carrie Snodgress.

== Recording ==
"Harvest" was recorded in April 1971. Unlike most of the songs on Harvest, which required a lot of mixing work, the released version of "Harvest" is a live two-track mix.

== Reception ==
Inglis describes "Harvest" as one of Young's best confessional songs where he expresses his guilt about being unable accept and reciprocate all the love that a woman wants to give him. Thomson describes "Harvest" as "underrated" and "the prettiest song on [Harvest]". Allmusic critic Matthew Greenwald described it as having a "retrained, artless grace that is truly timeless". McDonough regards it as "the one truly great moment on Harvest." In 2014 the editors of Rolling Stone Magazine described "Harvest" as a "lesser-known gem". On the other hand, in his initial review of the Harvest album, Rolling Stone critic John Mendelsohn criticized the Stray Gators' playing as a "flaccid imitation" of Young's other backing band of the period, Crazy Horse.

Young himself declared that "'Harvest' is one of my best songs. That is the best thing on Harvest."

== Personnel ==
- Neil Young – guitar, vocals
- Ben Keith – pedal steel guitar
- John Harris – piano
- Tim Drummond – bass
- Kenny Buttrey – drums
