= Out on the Weekend =

Song by Neil Young

from the album Harvest
- Released: February 1, 1972
- Recorded: April 2, 1971
- Studio: Quadrafonic Sound Studios, Nashville
- Genre: Country rock
- Length: 4:35
- Label: Reprise
- Songwriter(s): Neil Young
- Producer(s): Elliot Mazer; Neil Young

"Out on the Weekend" is a song written by Neil Young that was the opening song of his 1972 album Harvest.

== Music and lyrics ==
"Out on the Weekend" is a country ballad. Music lecturer Ken Bielen describes it as an "easy-flowing pop song". The Stray Gators provide the backing music. Allmusic critic Matthew Greenwald describes Ben Keith's playing on pedal steel to be a highlight of the song. Young biographer David Downing describes his pedal steel playing as having a "blue-sky purity." According to Greenwald, the music has a "searching, yearning melody that has the element of infinity and journey" that perfectly reflects the theme of the lyrics. Sound on Sound editor Sam Inglis describes the mood of the song as being "one of resignation, perhaps even exhaustion."

The song starts by describing a man getting away from the big city. Although the singer is traveling, he is reflecting on his past with what Downing describes as being "full of joy he can't relate to, floating in a dreamy sort of sadness." The lyrics then take on the theme of lovers who are lonely because they can't connect. Music critic Nigel Williamson describes the lyrics as reflecting an "emotional ambivalence." There is a contrast between comforting images such as a woman who is "so fine she is on [the singer's] mind" and "her big brass bed" and a "brand new day" against images of "a lonely boy" who "can't relate to joy" and is "so down today."

Young recognized this contrast, stating "Even when I'm happy it sounds like I'm not and when I try to say I'm happy I try to disguise it." About the boy who can't relate to joy Young stated that it "just means I'm so happy that I can't get it all out. But it doesn't sound happy. The way I wrote it sounds sad, like I tried to hide it."

Young has stated that this song, as well as "Harvest" and "Heart of Gold" from the same album, were inspired by his then blossoming love for actress Carrie Snodgress.

== Reception ==
Bielen claims "Out on the Weekend" has a "catchy hook" and could have been a hit if it was released as a single. According to music critic Johnny Rogan, the opening line of "Think I'll pack it in and buy a pickup" is one of Young's best expressions of "laid-back star-weariness." Inglis describes it as "a relatively slight song" but acknowledges that it "exemplifies the finesse at the heart of the Harvest sound. Inglis feels that combination of Young's "garage-band aesthetic" with "Nashville professionalism" "worked perfectly" on "Out on the Weekend." On the other hand, in his initial review of the Harvest album, Rolling Stone Magazine critic John Mendelsohn criticized the Stray Gators' playing as a "flaccid imitation" of Young's other backing band of the period, Crazy Horse.

Lady Gaga covered a verse from "Out on the Weekend" within her song "Fooled Me Again, Honest Eyes."

== Personnel ==
- Neil Young – acoustic guitar, vocals, harmonica
- Kenny Buttrey – drums
- Tim Drummond – bass
- Ben Keith – pedal steel guitar
