= Journey Through the Past =

Soundtrack album by Neil Young
- Released: November 7, 1972
- Recorded: January 18, 1966 – November 18, 1971
- Venues: Warwick Musical Theatre, Warwick, Rhode Island; Fillmore East, New York City
- Studios: Hollywood Palace, Hollywood; Broken Arrow Ranch, Woodside, California
- Genre: Rock
- Length: 60:48
- Label: Reprise
- Producers: Neil Young; L.A. Johnson

Neil Young chronology
Harvest (1972)	Journey Through the Past (1972)	Time Fades Away (1973)

Professional ratings
Review scores
Source	Rating
AllMusic	2/5 stars
Christgau's Record Guide	C+
Rolling Stone	(not rated)

Journey Through the Past is a double LP soundtrack album from the film of the same name by Canadian / American musician Neil Young, released in November 1972 on Reprise Records, catalogue number 2XS 6480. It peaked at No. 45 on the Billboard 200. Its initial release was on vinyl, cassette tape, reel-to-reel tape, and 8-track tape cartridge. Although its follow-up Time Fades Away was finally released on CD in August 2017, Journey Through the Past remains the only 1970s Neil Young album yet to see an official CD reissue.

== Content ==
Journey Through The Past features music derived mainly from four sources: television broadcasts with Buffalo Springfield; live recordings with Crosby, Stills, Nash & Young; rehearsal outtakes from the Harvest sessions with the Stray Gators; and recordings by the Tony and Susan Alamo Christian Foundation Orchestra and Chorus. It functions in part as a retrospective of Young's work, the first of his career.

Side one, tracks one and two are performed by Buffalo Springfield. The medley on track one are studio recordings, including a rare alternate version of "Mr. Soul", mimed to by the group for the television program The Hollywood Palace on January 20, 1967. The group was introduced by host Tony Martin. The second selection, "Rock and Roll Woman", derives from the group's appearance in 1967 on the television special Popendipity, recorded at the Warwick Musical Theater, Warwick, RI, on November 16, 1967. The group was introduced by Flip Wilson.

Side one, tracks three and four, and side two, track one, are live recordings by CSNY from an appearance at the Fillmore East in New York City on June 5, 1970.

The Harvest album outtakes on side two, tracks two and four, and all of side three derive from sessions on September 26 and 27, 1971 at Young's ranch in La Honda, California. Interspersed are conversations with Young, David Crosby, and Stephen Stills from the vocal overdub sessions done later in New York.

Side four, tracks two and three, respectively an excerpt from Messiah by George Frederic Handel and the musical theme composed by Miklós Rózsa for the film King of Kings, are performed by the Tony and Susan Alamo Christian Foundation Orchestra and Chorus, recorded on February 10, 1972.

The album contains only one new song by Young, "Soldier", recorded in a sawmill to the accompaniment of a roaring fire from a sawdust burner. It would later reappear in edited form on Young's Decade compilation. The record closes on side four with a track from the 1966 classic album Pet Sounds by the Beach Boys, the instrumental "Let's Go Away for Awhile".

== Track listing and personnel ==
All songs written by Neil Young, except where noted.

=== Side one ===
1. "For What It's Worth/Mr. Soul" (Stephen Stills/Young) – 3:48
  - Neil Young – electric guitar, vocal; Stephen Stills – electric guitar, vocal; Richie Furay – electric guitar, vocal; Bruce Palmer – bass; Dewey Martin – drums; Tony Martin - introduction
2. "Rock & Roll Woman" (Stills) – 2:53
  - Stills – electric guitar, vocal; Young – electric guitar, vocal; Furay – electric guitar, vocal; Palmer – bass; Martin – drums; Flip Wilson - introduction
3. "Find the Cost of Freedom" (Stills) – 1:59
  - Stephen Stills, Neil Young - Guitar, Vocal; David Crosby, Graham Nash – vocals
4. "Ohio" – 4:28
  - Young – electric guitar, vocal; Stills – electric guitar, vocal; Crosby – electric guitar, vocal; Nash – vocal; Calvin Samuels – bass; Johnny Barbata – drums

=== Side two ===
1. "Southern Man" – 7:00
  - Young – electric guitar, vocal; Stills – electric guitar, vocal; Crosby – electric guitar, vocal; Nash – Hammond organ, vocal; Samuels – bass; Barbata – drums
2. "Are You Ready for the Country?" – 2:00
  - Young – piano, vocal; Ben Keith – pedal steel guitar; Jack Nitzsche – lap steel guitar; Tim Drummond – bass; Kenny Buttrey – drums; Crosby, Nash – backing vocals
3. "Let Me Call You Sweetheart" (Leo Friedman, Beth Slater Whitson) – 0:58
  - unknown announcer and female chorus
4. "Alabama" – 6:29
  - Young – electric guitar, vocal; Keith – pedal steel guitar; Nitzsche – piano; Drummond – bass; Buttrey – drums; Stills, Crosby – backing vocals. Includes studio dialogue as above, a political statement by David Crosby, and an excerpt from Irving Berlin's song "God Bless America" performed by an unnamed choir.

=== Side three ===
1. "Words" – 15:51
  - Young – electric guitar, vocal; Keith – pedal steel guitar; Nitzsche – piano; Drummond – bass; Buttrey – drums. Includes studio dialogue as above.

=== Side four ===
1. "Relativity Invitation" (dialogue from the film) – 1:15
2. "Handel's Messiah" (George Frideric Handel) – 2:43
3. "King of Kings" (Miklós Rózsa) – 5:12
  - Tracks 2–3 performed by The Tony & Susan Alamo Christian Foundation Orchestra & Chorus
4. "Soldier" – 3:58
  - Young – piano, vocal
5. "Let's Go Away for Awhile" (Brian Wilson) – 2:14
  - Jim Getzoff, Bill Kurasch, Lenny Malarsky, Jim Reisler, Ralph Schaeffer, Sid Sharp, Tibor Zelig – violins; Joe DiFiore, Harry Hyams – violas; Justin DiTullio, Joe Saxon – cellos; Roy Caton – trumpet; Jules Jacob – flute; Steve Douglas, Jim Horn, Plas Johnson, Jay Migliori – saxophones; Al De Lory – piano; Lyle Ritz – double bass; Carol Kaye – bass guitar; Julius Wechter – tympani, vibraphone; Hal Blaine – drums

== Personnel ==
- Neil Young – guitars, piano, vocals
- Stephen Stills, Richie Furay – guitars, vocals
- Bruce Palmer, Calvin "Fuzzy" Samuels, Tim Drummond – bass guitar
- Dewey Martin, John Barbata, Kenny Buttrey – drums
- David Crosby – rhythm guitar, vocals
- Graham Nash – organ, vocals
- Ben Keith – pedal steel guitar
- Jack Nitzsche – piano

Additional roles

- Fredric Underhill – photography
- Bill Halverson, Elliot Mazer, Ray Thompson – recording

== Charts ==
Chart performance for Journey Through The Past
Chart (1972–73)	Peak position
Australia (Kent Music Report)	39
US Billboard Top LPs & Tape	45
Canadian RPM 100 Albums	19
Japanese Album Charts	32
US Cash Box Top 100 Albums	45
US Record World Album Chart	49
