= War Song =

- Side A of the Canadian single

Single by Neil Young and Graham Nash
- B-side: "The Needle and the Damage Done"
- Released: June 24, 1972
- Recorded: May 22, 1972
- Studio: Broken Arrow Ranch
- Genre: Rock
- Length: 3:35
- Label: Reprise
- Songwriter: Neil Young
- Producers: Elliot Mazer; Tim Mulligan; L.A. Johnson; Neil Young

Neil Young singles chronology
"Old Man" (1972)	"War Song" (1972)	"Time Fades Away" (1973)

Graham Nash singles chronology
"I Used to Be a King" (1971)	"War Song" (1972)	"Prison Song" (1973)

"War Song" is a 1972 single credited to Neil Young & Graham Nash, backed by The Stray Gators. It was released in support of George McGovern's 1972 presidential campaign, who was running against incumbent President Richard Nixon. Young had already voiced his opinions of Nixon two years prior with "Ohio" while a member of Crosby, Stills, Nash & Young, and once again tried to make an impact with a protest song. Despite his and Nash's intentions, the single failed to make a serious impression.

Cash Box described the song as a "philosophical/political opus in the groove of [the Crosby, Stills, Nash & Young song] 'Ohio.'" Record World called it "an angry reply to the renewed bombing of North Vietnam" and said that "it's the best Young has sounded in some time."

The single itself soon went out of print. Warner Brothers released the song on their 1974 loss leader Series album Hard Goods (a promotional series used primarily to promote rock acts on the label at the time). After that, "War Song" would remain unreleased in any other format until June 2009, when it was released on CD, DVD, and Blu-ray on a box set by Neil Young called The Archives Vol. 1 1963–1972.

== Personnel ==
- Neil Young – guitar, harmonica, vocals
- Graham Nash – vocals
- Ben Keith – pedal steel guitar
- Jack Nitzsche – piano
- Tim Drummond – bass
- Kenny Buttrey – drums

== Charts ==
=== Weekly charts ===
Chart (1972)	Peak position
Canada RPM Top Singles	40
US Billboard Hot 100	61
US Cashbox Top 100	52
US Record World Top 100	51
Japan (Oricon)	97

== See also ==
- List of anti-war songs
