= Are You Ready for the Country (song) =

1972 song by Neil Young

"Are You Ready for the Country?"

Song by Neil Young

from the album Harvest
- Released: February 1, 1972
- Recorded: September 2, 1971
- Studio: Broken Arrow Ranch
- Genre: Country rock
- Length: 3:33
- Label: Reprise
- Songwriter: Neil Young
- Producers: Neil Young; Elliot Mazer

"Are You Ready for the Country?"

Single by Waylon Jennings

from the album Are You Ready for the Country
- B-side: "So Good Woman"
- Released: November 20, 1976
- Genre: Country rock
- Length: 3:12
- Label: RCA Victor
- Songwriter: Neil Young
- Producers: Waylon Jennings; Ken Mansfield

Waylon Jennings singles chronology
"Can't You See" (1976)	"Are You Ready for the Country?" (1976)	"Luckenbach, Texas (Back to the Basics of Love)" (1977)

"Are You Ready for the Country?" is a song written by Neil Young and released on his 1972 Harvest album. The track features Young on piano backed by the studio band dubbed The Stray Gators, comprising Jack Nitzsche on slide guitar, Ben Keith on pedal steel guitar, Tim Drummond on bass, and Kenny Buttrey on drums. Backing vocals on the track are by David Crosby and Graham Nash. The recording was made in a studio set up in a barn on Young's ranch.

== Lyrics and music ==
According to Sam Inglis, the "country" referenced in the song’s title is never made explicit, but it seems likely to be the United States, specifically the southern United States, an area referenced in other Young songs such as "Southern Man" and "Alabama," though its lyrics are not as expressly political. Rather than addressing issues like racism, the lyrics of "Are You Ready for the Country" are more about generalized dread. Lyrics like "I was talkin' to the preacher, said, 'God was on my side'/Then I ran into the hangman, he said, 'It's time to die'" imply that there is more to the story, and perhaps a more interesting backstory, than what is explicitly stated, and hint at an organized religion theme. The title may be Young asking his audience if they are willing to follow him into country music, although Inglis states that the arrangement is more blues than country.

Allmusic critic Matthew Greenwald states that the arrangement provides a sense of whimsy, highlighting Young's "funky" piano and Nitzsche's "lazy" slide guitar. Ken Bielen describes the melody as "punchy" and says it works well with the song's "sing-a-long vocal character." Bielen also comments on the "rustic" quality added by Nitzsche's slide guitar.

== Critical reception ==
Rolling Stone Magazine critic John Mendelsohn said the song seemed like "an in-joke throwaway intended for the amusement of certain of Neil's superstar pals."

== Personnel ==
- Neil Young – piano, vocals
- Jack Nitzsche – lap slide guitar
- Ben Keith – dobro
- Tim Drummond – bass
- Kenny Buttrey – drums
- David Crosby – vocals
- Graham Nash – vocals

== Cover versions ==
The song was released as a single by American country music artist Waylon Jennings in 1976, the second single from the album named after the song, Are You Ready for the Country. Jennings changed the lyrics of the chorus from "Are you ready for the country/Because it's time to go" to "Are you ready for the country?/Are you ready for me?" The Jennings single reached #7 on the Billboard Hot Country Singles & Tracks chart.

The song was also released in 1985 by cowpunk band Jason & the Scorchers, as the B-side of their single "White Lies", using the Jennings lyric change.

A further version was released as a single by Hank Williams, Jr. (featuring Eric Church) in 2015.

== Chart performance ==
=== Waylon Jennings ===
Chart (1976–1977)	Peak position
US Hot Country Songs (Billboard)	7
Canadian RPM Country Tracks	3

=== Hank Williams, Jr. featuring Eric Church ===
Chart (2015–2016)	Peak position
US Country Airplay (Billboard)	46
