= On the Beach (Neil Young album) =

1974 studio album by Neil Young

Studio album by Neil Young
- Released: July 19, 1974
- Recorded: November 30, 1973 – April 7, 1974
- Studios: Sunset Sound (Hollywood); Broken Arrow Ranch (Woodside, California)
- Genres: Folk rock; country rock; blues rock
- Length: 39:40
- Label: Reprise
- Producers: Neil Young; David Briggs (tracks 1 & 4); Mark Harman (tracks 2–3 & 5); Al Schmitt (tracks 6–8)

Neil Young chronology
Time Fades Away (1973)	On the Beach (1974)	Tonight's the Night (1975)

Singles from On the Beach
- 1. "Walk On" / "For the Turnstiles" Released: June 1974

On the Beach is the fifth studio album by Canadian-American musician Neil Young, released by Reprise Records in July 1974. It is the second of the so-called "Ditch Trilogy" that Young recorded following the massive success of 1972's Harvest, and expresses feelings of over-exposure, alienation and melancholy.

== Background ==
Looking back on the album for the liner notes to the Decade box set, Young wrote of "Heart of Gold": "This song put me in the middle of the road. Traveling there soon became a bore, so I headed for the ditch. A rougher ride but I saw more interesting people there." Recorded after (but released before) Tonight's the Night, On the Beach shares some of that album's bleakness and crude production — which came as a shock to fans and critics alike, as this was the long-awaited studio follow-up to the commercially and critically successful Harvest. It hinted towards a more subtle outlook, particularly on the opening track, "Walk On".

As happened with Tonight's the Night, On the Beach under-performed commercially but went on to attain high regard from fans and critics alike. Both albums were recorded in a haphazard manner, with a variety of session musicians often changing their instruments while Young offered basic arrangements for them to follow. He chose rough, monitor mixes of songs rather than a more polished sound, alienating his sound engineers in the process. Throughout the recording process, Young and his colleagues consumed a homemade concoction dubbed "honey slides", a goop of sauteed marijuana and honey that "felt like heroin", at the behest of session musician and de facto producer Rusty Kershaw. This may account for the mellow mood of the album, particularly on its second half.

While the original Rolling Stone review described On the Beach as "one of the most despairing albums of the decade", later critics, including Allmusic's William Ruhlmann, used the benefit of hindsight to conclude that Young was in fact "saying goodbye to despair, not being overwhelmed by it". Neil Young concluded: "Good album. One side of it particularly — the side with 'Ambulance Blues', 'Motion Pictures' and 'On the Beach'. It's out there. It's a great take."

== Writing ==
On the Beach is a folk rock album exploring themes of anger, alienation, and cautious optimism. "Walk On", the album's opener, has Young combining his melancholy outlook with a wish to move on and keep living. In the liner notes to Decade, Young describes the song as: "My over defensive reaction to criticisms of Tonight's The Night and the seemingly endless flow of money coming from you people out there." The social commentary "See the Sky About to Rain" dates from Harvest. It had been covered by the Byrds a year earlier on their eponymous reunion album.

"Revolution Blues" was inspired by the criminal cult leader Charles Manson, whom Young had met when he lived in Topanga Canyon, about six months before the Tate–LaBianca murders. In a 1985 interview, Young said they had met through the musician Dennis Wilson, and that Manson had wanted him to introduce him to the record executive Mo Ostin to help him record music. Young said: "Musically I thought he was very unique. I thought he really had something crazy, something great. He was like a living poet... But I think he was very frustrated in not being able to get it, and he blamed somebody." Young's bandmates objected to playing "Revolution Blues" live. Young said: "It's just a fuckin' song. What's the big deal? It's about culture. It's about what's really happening."

"For the Turnstiles" is a country-folk hybrid featuring Young's banjo guitar and a harmony vocal from Ben Keith, who also played dobro. The lyrics critique the music industry, with Young later stating in the Decade liner notes: "If statues could speak and Casey was still at bat, some promoter somewhere would be making deals with Ticketron right now." The side closes with "Vampire Blues", a cynical attack on the oil industry, and side two opens with "On the Beach", a slow, bluesy meditation on the downsides of fame.

"Motion Pictures" is an elegy for Young's relationship with actress Carrie Snodgress, which was falling apart. Young remembers in Waging Heavy Peace: "We were all high on honey slides... A couple of spoonfuls of that and you would be laid-back into the middle of next week. The record was slow and dreamy, kind of underwater without bubbles." The song was written in a Los Angeles hotel room while watching TV. Kershaw described the song's genesis: "We didn't work every day, we only worked when we felt really inspired. Me and Ben and Neil were sittin' in Ben's room. Neil started hummin' somethin', and I started playin' along with the melody on the steel. Ben started playin' bass, it sounded so goddamn pretty. Neil picked up a pen and just wrote the words right then and put that motherfucker down while it was still smeared all over us."

"Ambulance Blues" closes the album. In a 1992 interview for the French Guitare & Claviers magazine, Young said that song was based on "Needle of Death" by Bert Jansch, who he said was on a par with Jimi Hendrix: "I wasn't even aware of it, and someone else drew my attention to it." It explores Young's feelings about his critics, Richard Nixon, and the state of CSNY. The line, "You're all just pissing in the wind", was a direct quote from Young's manager Elliot Roberts regarding the inactivity of the quartet. The song also references the Riverboat, a small coffeehouse in Toronto's Yorkville neighbourhood which was an early venue for folk-inspired artists like Gordon Lightfoot, Bruce Cockburn, Joni Mitchell, Simon & Garfunkel, and Arlo Guthrie. The line, "Oh, Isabella, proud Isabella, they tore you down and plowed you under", references 88 Isabella Street, an old rooming house in Toronto where Neil and Rick James stayed for a period. It was demolished in the early 1970s and an apartment building now stands on its location. Young confirms in a 2023 post to the "Letters to the Editor" section of his website that the verse about the man who tells so many lies was indeed written for Richard Nixon.

== Recording ==
Most of the album was recorded at Sunset Sound in Hollywood in late March and early April 1974. Two tracks, "Walk On" and "For the Turnstiles" were recorded months prior at Young's ranch. David Briggs fell ill and missed most of the sessions. Sideman Ben Keith took the lead in recruiting Rusty Kershaw and members of the Band to play on the album. Members of both Crazy Horse and CSNY also contributed to the sessions.

Young recorded several new songs at his ranch in November and December 1973. These included "Winterlong" from Decade, "Borrowed Tune" from Tonight's the Night, demos of "Traces" and "Ambulance Blues" as well as new attempts at "Bad Fog of Loneliness", "Human Highway", and "Mellow My Mind". The sessions also produced the album tracks "Walk On" and "For the Turnstiles". Ben Keith humorously remembers recording the latter song on dobro and banjo with Young and pushing his vocal abilities to the limit: "I'd sing these off, weird harmonies, and Neil'd go, 'Oh, that's cool—do that.' I didn't know I could sing that high—I still can't. I must've been sittin' on a crack and got my balls in there."

The remaining sessions were held at Sunset Sound, where Young had previously recorded with Buffalo Springfield and Crazy Horse. The mood of the sessions was heavily influenced by the honey slides, creating a very melancholy, depressed atmosphere. Additionally, Young was at the time realizing that his relationship with Carrie Snodgress was disintegrating. Rusty Kershaw insisted on taking a relaxed approach to recording, rejecting the need to rehearse the material beforehand. He explains in Shakey:

"I said, 'Neil, when it'll move me the most is the first time you play it. You're gonna do it your very best then, and I can play it with you the first time. We only have to sit real close together. Neil said to me later, 'How in the hell do you know how to play this thing the first time I play it? You don't know what I'm gonna do.' I said, Neil, you carry a heavy vibe, and if I'm sittin' close to you, I can feel what you feel before you play. I know where you’re gonna go.'"

Dissatisfied with their complacent performances, Kershaw managed to motivate the other musicians to inject extra energy and unease into the recording of "Revolution Blues" through wild behavior and crazy antics in the studio: "I said, 'Look, man, you don't sound like you're tryin' to start a fuckin' revolution. Here's how you start that.' And I just started breakin' a bunch of shit and Ben jumped right in there. I said, 'That's a revolution, muth' fucker.' Goddamn, that sparked Neil right off. He got it on the next take."

== Music ==
According to Amanda Petrusich of Pitchfork: "Ragged, contradictory, and oddly poignant, On the Beach is a hazy swirl of steel guitar, dobro, Wurlitzer, slide, and Young's high, lonesome whine. All of Young's trademark ugly solos, self-implicating lyrics, and cantankerous charm remain intact, but the songwriting here is vaguely softer, an almost apologetic (and certainly dissatisfied) homage to nasty, mid-'70s America."

== Album cover ==
The album cover was designed by art director Gary Burden with photography by Bob Seidemann. It features Young facing the ocean at Santa Monica Beach with an umbrella and a 1959 Cadillac sticking up out of the sand. The inside of the album cover matches the pattern on the underside of the umbrella. Young wrote in Waging Heavy Peace that it is one of his favourite covers, the idea of which came like "a blot from the blue":

"Gary and I traveled around getting all the pieces to put it together. We went to a junkyard in Santa Ana to get the tail fin and fender from a 1959 Cadillac, complete with taillights... We picked up the bad polyester yellow jacket and white pants at a sleazy men's shop... Finally we grabbed a local LA paper to use as a prop. It had this amazing headline: SEN. BUCKLEY CALLS FOR NIXON TO RESIGN... That was the creative process at work. We lived for that, Gary and I, and we still do."

== Release ==
In addition to its release on vinyl, On the Beach was also released on cassette and 8-track cartridge, though the track listing for the latter formats was the reverse of that on the vinyl album. It remained unavailable on CD until 2003, when a remastered version was finally released. It has since been re-released as Disc 2 of the 4-CD box set Neil Young Original Release Series Discs 5-8. The album is also available in high-resolution audio on the Neil Young Archives website, where four additional album outtakes were added in February 2021.

Originally Young had intended for the A and B sides of the LP to be in reverse order but was convinced by David Briggs to swap them at the last moment. Young has said that he later came to regret caving in, although both the cassette and 8-track versions were released with the sides swapped.

For about two decades, rarity made a cult out of On the Beach. The title was deleted from vinyl in the early 1980s and was only briefly available on cassette and 8-track cartridge tape, or European imports or bootlegs. Along with three other mid-period Young albums, it was withheld from re-release until 2003. The reasons for this remain murky, but there is some evidence that Young himself did not want the album out on CD, variously citing "fidelity problems" and legal issues. Beginning in 2000, over 5,000 fans signed an online petition calling for the release of the album on CD. It was finally released on CD on Reprise Records in August 2003.

== Promotion ==
Young did not tour behind the album, instead joining CSNY for their Summer 1974 large stadium tour, chronicled in the 2014 live album CSNY 1974, where the group played "Walk On", "Revolution Blues" and "On the Beach" and Young would perform "Ambulance Blues" solo acoustic. Prior to the tour, Young would also play a widely bootlegged solo acoustic set at The Bottom Line in New York, where he would debut the album's songs and famously share his recipe for honey slides.

== Reception ==
Professional ratings
Review scores
Source	Rating
AllMusic	5/5 stars
The Austin Chronicle	3/5 stars
Christgau's Record Guide	A−
Drowned in Sound	10/10
Encyclopedia of Popular Music	5/5 stars
The Great Rock Discography	9/10
MusicHound Rock	3/5
Pitchfork	9.5/10
The Rolling Stone Album Guide	4/5 stars
Spin Alternative Record Guide	8/10

Reviewing in Christgau's Record Guide: Rock Albums of the Seventies (1981), Robert Christgau wrote: "Something in [Young's] obsessive self-examination is easy to dislike and something in his whiny thinness hard to enjoy. But even 'Ambulance Blues,' an eight-minute throwaway, is studded with great lines, one of which is 'It's hard to know the meaning of this song.' And I can hum it for you if you'd like."

Pitchfork listed it #65 on their list of the Top 100 Albums of the 1970s. On the Beach was certified gold in the United States, selling 500,000 copies. In 2007, On the Beach was placed at #40 in Bob Mersereau's book The Top 100 Canadian Albums. It was voted number 195 in Colin Larkin's All Time Top 1000 Albums in 2000. In 2020, Rolling Stone included the album at number 311 on their list of The 500 Greatest Albums of All Time, writing: "Reeling from the losses that sparked Tonight's the Night the previous year, Neil Young shelved that album for a while and made this one instead: a wild fireball of anger (“Revolution Blues”), nihilism (“For the Turnstiles”), and tentative optimism (“Walk On”). The album peaks on Side Two, a stoned symphony of grieving whose three songs (“On the Beach,” “Motion Pictures,” “Ambulance Blues”) are among the most emotionally real in Young's catalogue."

== Track listing ==
All tracks are written by Neil Young. All track timings are from the original vinyl release, R 2180.

=== Side one ===
1. "Walk On" (2:40)
  - Neil Young – guitar, vocal; Ben Keith – slide guitar, vocal; Billy Talbot – bass; Ralph Molina – drums, vocal
  - Recorded at Studio, Broken Arrow Ranch, 11/30/1973. Produced by David Briggs & Neil Young.
2. "See the Sky About to Rain" (5:03)
  - Neil Young – Wurlitzer electric piano, vocal; Ben Keith – steel guitar; Tim Drummond – bass; Levon Helm – drums; Joe Yankee – harmonica
  - Recorded at Sunset Sound, Hollywood, CA, 3/29/1974. Produced by Neil Young & Mark Harman.
3. "Revolution Blues" (4:02)
  - Neil Young – guitar, vocal; Ben Keith – Wurlitzer electric piano; David Crosby – guitar; Rick Danko – bass; Levon Helm – drums
  - Recorded at Sunset Sound, Hollywood, CA, 4/6/1974. Produced by Neil Young & Mark Harman.
4. "For the Turnstiles" (3:13)
  - Neil Young – banjo guitar, vocal; Ben Keith – dobro, vocal
  - Recorded at Studio, Broken Arrow Ranch, 12/14/1973. Produced by Neil Young & David Briggs.
5. "Vampire Blues" (4:11)
  - Neil Young – guitar, vocal; Ben Keith – organ, vocal, hair drum; George Whitsell – guitar; Tim Drummond – bass, percussion; Ralph Molina – drums
  - Recorded at Sunset Sound, Hollywood, CA, 4/7/1974. Produced by Neil Young & Mark Harman.

=== Side two ===
1. "On the Beach" (7:04)
  - Neil Young – guitar, vocal; Ben Keith – hand drums; Graham Nash – Wurlitzer electric piano; Tim Drummond – bass; Ralph Molina – drums
  - Recorded at Sunset Sound, Hollywood, CA, 3/28/1974. Produced by Neil Young & Al Schmitt.
2. "Motion Pictures" (4:20)
  - Neil Young – guitar, vocal, harmonica; Ben Keith – bass; Rusty Kershaw – slide guitar; Ralph Molina – hand drums
  - Recorded at Sunset Sound, Hollywood, 3/26/1974. Produced by Neil Young & Al Schmitt.
3. "Ambulance Blues" (8:57)
  - Neil Young – guitar, vocal, harmonica, electric tambourine; Ben Keith – bass; Rusty Kershaw – fiddle; Ralph Molina – hand drums
  - Recorded at Sunset Sound, Hollywood, 3/25/1974. Produced by Neil Young & Al Schmitt.

== Personnel ==
- Neil Young – vocals; guitar on "Walk On", "Revolution Blues", "Vampire Blues", "On the Beach", "Motion Pictures" and "Ambulance Blues"; harmonica on "See the Sky About to Rain", "Motion Pictures" and "Ambulance Blues"; Wurlitzer electric piano on "See the Sky About to Rain"; banjo guitar on "For the Turnstiles"; electric tambourine on "Ambulance Blues"
- Ben Keith – slide guitar, vocal on "Walk On"; steel guitar on "See the Sky About to Rain"; Wurlitzer electric piano on "Revolution Blues"; Dobro, vocal on "For the Turnstiles"; organ, vocal, and hair drum on "Vampire Blues"; hand drums on "On the Beach"; bass on "Motion Pictures" and "Ambulance Blues"
- Rusty Kershaw – slide guitar on "Motion Pictures"; fiddle on "Ambulance Blues"
- David Crosby – rhythm guitar on "Revolution Blues"
- George Whitsell – guitar on "Vampire Blues"
- Graham Nash – Wurlitzer electric piano on "On the Beach"
- Tim Drummond – bass on "See the Sky About to Rain", "Vampire Blues" and "On the Beach"; percussion on "Vampire Blues"
- Billy Talbot – bass on "Walk On"
- Rick Danko – bass on "Revolution Blues"
- Ralph Molina – drums and vocal on "Walk On"; drums on "Vampire Blues" and "On the Beach"; hand drums on "Motion Pictures" and "Ambulance Blues"
- Levon Helm – drums on "See the Sky About to Rain" and "Revolution Blues"

Technical

- Gary Burden – art direction, design
- Bob Seidemann – cover photography

Note

- Neil Young credited as Joe Yankee for "electric tambourine" on "Ambulance Blues"
- All songs recorded at Sunset Sound, Los Angeles, except "Walk On" and "For The Turnstiles", recorded at Broken Arrow Studios, San Francisco (Woodside, nr. Redwood City, nr. San Francisco)

== Charts ==
=== Weekly charts ===
Weekly chart performance for On The Beach
Chart (1974)	Peak position
Australia (Kent Music Report)	34
Canadian RPM 100 Albums	13
French Album Charts	3
Japanese Album Charts	48
Norwegian VG-lista Albums	10
Dutch MegaCharts Albums	5
UK Albums Chart	42
US Billboard Top LPs & Tape	16
US Cash Box Top 100 Albums	8
US Record World Album Chart	16

Chart (2024)	Peak position
Scottish Albums (Official Charts)	97

=== Year-end charts ===
Year-end chart performance for On the Beach
Chart (1974)	Rank
Canada Album Charts	86

=== Singles ===
Year	Single	Chart	Position
1974	"Walk On"	US Billboard Pop Singles	69
1974	"Walk On"	US Cashbox Pop Singles	54
1974	"Walk On"	US Record World Pop Singles	66

== Certifications ==
Region	Certification	Certified units/sales
United Kingdom (BPI)	Silver	60,000^{^}
United States (RIAA)	Gold	500,000^{^}
^{^} Shipments figures based on certification alone.
