= Time Fades Away =

Live album by Neil Young
- Released: October 15, 1973
- Recorded: February 11 – April 1, 1973 (Note: except "Love in Mind": January 30, 1971)
- Venue: Various
- Genres: Hard rock; country rock
- Length: 34:33
- Label: Reprise
- Producers: Neil Young; Elliot Mazer

Neil Young chronology
Journey Through the Past (1972)	Time Fades Away (1973)	On the Beach (1974)

Singles from Time Fades Away
- 1. "Time Fades Away" / "The Last Trip to Tulsa" Released: November 26, 1973

Time Fades Away is a 1973 live album by Canadian-American musician Neil Young. Consisting of previously unreleased material, it was recorded with the Stray Gators on the support tour following 1972's highly successful album Harvest. Due to Young's dissatisfaction with the tour, it was omitted from his catalogue and not released on compact disc until 2017. The album is the first of the so-called "Ditch Trilogy" of albums that Young recorded following the major success of Harvest, whereupon the scope of his success and acclaim became so apparent that Young subsequently experienced alienation from his music and career.

Nevertheless, Time Fades Away received much critical praise and was widely pirated after lapsing out of print because of the ensuing demand from fans. It was initially reissued on vinyl as part of the Official Release Series Discs 5-8 Vinyl Box Set for Record Store Day in 2014, then reissued again for its 50th anniversary in 2023 as Time Fades Away 50. The album finally saw an official CD release in August 2017 as part of the CD version of the boxset. It gradually became available on streaming platforms and on the Neil Young Archives website in 2021.

== History ==
Though "Love in Mind" dates from a 1971 solo tour, all other songs on the album are from the Harvest tour in early 1973. The program featured an acoustic solo set followed by an electric set with the Stray Gators. Longtime collaborator and former Crazy Horse guitarist Danny Whitten had been set to join the Gators as a second guitarist before being sent home from rehearsals after it became evident that he was in no condition to embark on the rigorous tour. He succumbed to a fatal combination of Valium and alcohol on the night following his dismissal.

Unlike Young's previous ensembles, the Stray Gators consisted of notable Nashville and Los Angeles session musicians; keyboardist Jack Nitzsche was the only member of the group who had worked with Young prior to Harvest. During the rehearsals, drummer Kenny Buttrey demanded a salary of $100,000 (roughly $727,577 in 2023) to compensate for lost session work, leading Nitzsche (with support from Tim Drummond) to prevail upon the singer to extend this salary to the other band members. Although Young reluctantly acquiesced, Nitzsche would later reflect that "Neil got so pissed off ... I don't think things ever recovered after that."

In the wake of the relatively dulcet Harvest, audiences did not always react positively to the new songs, many of which were emblematic of the Gators' raucous and heavily electrified live sound. Struggling to cope with Whitten's death, Young lambasted band members' performances following concerts and scheduled soundchecks that were often cancelled on short notice. Such behavior frustrated Buttrey, who left the band and was immediately replaced by former Turtles/Jefferson Airplane percussionist Johnny Barbata. Having previously stepped in to replace Dallas Taylor on Crosby, Stills, Nash & Young's 1970 tour, Barbata ultimately performed on all of the Stray Gators selections on the album. At the instigation of Drummond, Young also developed a penchant for tequila, with the singer later remarking that "it does something else to me than alcohol usually does."

Other band members performed erratically: according to producer Elliot Mazer, Nitzsche would often spew obscenities into his switched-off vocal microphone, while pedal steel/dobro player Ben Keith was so inebriated at one soundcheck that he could not recall the key of "Don't Be Denied", a song slated for the album. Following the loss of a pickup on his signature Old Black (a heavily modified 1953 Gibson Les Paul Goldtop), Young switched to a Gibson Flying V; according to Young, the guitar "wouldn't stay in tune" and had other problems. Biographer Jimmy McDonough has characterized Young's performances on the instrument as "the worst guitar playing of his career."

Alcohol abuse and strained singing would lead the singer to develop a throat infection in the final days of the tour. In a partial reunion of CSN&Y, Young hired David Crosby and Graham Nash to augment the harmonies and play rhythm guitar. Despite their integration, the band's repertoire remained confined to Young originals. Moreover, clashes among the Stray Gators continued, with Nitzsche complaining that he could not hear himself playing because Crosby's 12-string electric guitar overpowered the sound mix. Following sixty-two concerts over three months, the tour ended at the Salt Palace in Salt Lake City, Utah on April 3, 1973.

== Songs ==
Though the ambitious tour was booked to promote Young's hugely successful Harvest album, Young also used the setlists to introduce several new songs. In addition to the eight songs that would eventually make up Time Fades Away, he also debuted the songs "Borrowed Tune", "New Mama" and "Lookout Joe", all of which see release on Tonight's the Night as well as "Come Along and Say You Will" and "Sweet Joni", which would go unreleased until 2020's Archives Volume II.

Prior to the tour, Young would record several of these songs in studio. On November 15, 1972, he booked solo sessions with producer Henry Lewy at A&M Recording Studios in Los Angeles. One month later on December 15, he would record additional songs with the Stray Gators at his ranch with Elliot Mazer producing. Although these sessions produced several master takes, a live album from the tour was assembled instead. Much of the sessions were released on Young's Archives Volume II in 2020.

"Love in Mind", "Journey through the Past" and "The Bridge" all date to Young's solo acoustic tour in early 1971, but were ultimately not included in the album Harvest.

"Love in Mind" was written in Detroit during the 1971 solo tour. Young explains during his BBC Television appearance that year: "I used to call this girl from the road, that I'd never, that I was in love with, but I'd never really met. I used to talk to her on the phone all the time. And late at night I would talk to her on the phone because of the time difference. And I'd wake up the next morning feeling so good."

"The Bridge" was inspired by the 1930 long poem of the same name by Hart Crane.

The song "L.A." dates from 1968, and its lyrics consider the city's freeway traffic and smog and people who "live under palm trees looking out at the ocean and worry about earthquakes." Young wrote the song around the time of his first album after leaving Buffalo Springfield, but was too paranoid to release it then due to its critical lyrics. Jack Nitzsche helped remind Young of the song at the beginning of the tour: "It's not really new; I wrote it in 1968. My friend Jack reminded me about it a couple weeks ago. He wrote it down and I had to read it all out again because I had forgotten it totally." Young performed the song on the tour both by himself on acoustic guitar and with the full band. An acoustic performance appears on Archives Volume II.

"Don't Be Denied" is one of Young's most autobiographical songs. Its lyrics recount his experiences as a schoolchild in Winnipeg after his parents' divorce, learning guitar with his friend Comrie Smith and dreaming of being a star, and achieving that stardom in Buffalo Springfield. The song was written in mid December 1972, during rehearsals for the tour.

== Recording ==
Time Fades Away was recorded directly from the soundboard to 16-track and mixed simultaneously to LP cutting using the Quad-Eight Compumix.

"There were no 2-track masters ever made of this record. The master discs were cut directly from the 16-track masters through the Compumix system. A mix was recorded to a second 16-track machine--we had 2 that would run perfectly together--to feed the variable pitch system of the lathe--but was discarded when we were through. I was the mastering engineer who cut the masters". - Phil Brown

While no master tape was created in the traditional sense, stereo tapes were in fact created while cutting to enable future remastering.

== Release ==
Time Fades Away was released on Reprise on October 15, 1973, catalogue number MS 2151. The album reached #22 on the Billboard Top LPs & Tape chart, and quickly achieved gold status, selling over 1 million copies in both the US and UK. It was issued on vinyl, cassette and 8-track.

The album's title track was briefly released as a 7" single in November 1973, with the B-side of "Last Trip to Tulsa", a live version of the song recorded in Baton Rouge, Louisiana on the Time Fades Away tour and unavailable anywhere else at that time. It continued to remain unavailable for another 47 years until its release on the Neil Young Archives Volume II: 1972–1976 box set released in November 2020.

== Legacy ==
Cameron Crowe pays homage to both the album itself and the Joel Bernstein album cover photograph in his movie Almost Famous. In great detail, as the lights go down during Stillwater's first concert performance of the movie, the short scene recreates the cover, from the raised hand of the concert-goer, to the solitary rose at the edge of the stage.

== Reception ==
Professional ratings
Review scores
Source	Rating
AllMusic	4/5 stars
Christgau's Record Guide	A
Rolling Stone	positive
Pitchfork	9.1/10

Upon its release, Time Fades Away received positive reviews from Rolling Stone, The New York Times, and Robert Christgau of The Village Voice. In more recent years, it has been rated highly by AllMusic, Sputnikmusic, and Blurt Online.

Cash Box called the title track "infectious" stating that it is "a rocker with that laid back Neil Young quality that has made him the favorite of the masses." Record World said that it "should be another hit for the living legend."

"Neil Young, having tasted fame and fortune with After the Goldrush and Harvest, famously said he would rather head for the ditch than stay in the middle of the road. And that's just what he did with Time Fades Away. Young recorded the stoned, muddy, hard-rocking album on a stadium tour to confused audiences who had never heard the songs before. No atmosphere, no acoustic balladry, just memories of getting a kicking in the schoolyard and an extended moan about LA. Young's profile duly disappeared."

— Bob Stanley of The Guardian, talking about the album's release in 2008.

=== Comments from Young ===
Neil Young commented on Time Fades Away in the original, unreleased liner notes for his 1977 triple-album compilation Decade:

Time Fades Away. No songs from this album are included here. It was recorded on my biggest tour ever, 65 [sic] shows in 90 days. Money hassles among everyone concerned ruined this tour and record for me but I released it anyway so you folks could see what could happen if you lose it for a while. I was becoming more interested in an audio verite approach than satisfying the public demands for a repetition of Harvest.

In 1987, Young told an interviewer that Time Fades Away was "the worst record I ever made – but as a documentary of what was happening to me, it was a great record. I was onstage and I was playing all these songs that nobody had heard before, recording them, and I didn't have the right band. It was just an uncomfortable tour. I felt like a product, and I had this band of all-star musicians that couldn't even look at each other."

Young has rarely performed songs from Time Fades Away live. "Don't Be Denied" was played during the 1974 CSNY tour. In July 2008, he performed the record's title track at a concert in Oberhausen, Germany. A 2014 documentary on Young was also named Don't Be Denied. On April 24, 2024 he played the song with Crazy Horse in a concert at the San Diego State University Open Air Theatre.

== Reissues ==
Time Fades Away long remained the only officially released Neil Young album unavailable on compact disc. Young had often cited his unfavorable memories of the tour as the main reason that the record had not been reissued.

In the mid-1990s, plans were made to release the album on CD using the HDCD encoding; several test pressings were made, and a release date of November 7, 1995, was announced. However, the CD release was shelved for unknown reasons. In early 2007, Young's management reiterated that there were no plans to release the album on CD. Pristine vinyl copies are still available in used stores and on eBay, often with the fold-out liner notes still intact; some CDs from the 1995 test pressings exist, and copies of these CDs are circulated as bootlegs. Additionally, some fans have made CDs from the more readily available vinyl copies.

In 2014, Young released a limited edition box set of vinyl records that includes the original Time Fades Away along with On the Beach, Tonight's the Night, and Zuma. From December 2014, Young's first 14 albums, including Time Fades Away, were released as high-resolution downloads via the Pono digital music service, HDTracks and Qobuz. The album finally saw an official CD release in August 2017 as part of the CD version of Official Release Series Discs 5-8 boxset. The CD version was finally released for individual purchase on September 23, 2022.

Time Fades Away is also available on streaming platforms such as Deezer and Apple Music. It is also available for streaming and download in high resolution audio on the Neil Young Archives website.

On November 3, 2024, a 50th anniversary reissue entitled Time Fades Away 50 was released, featuring an extra track, "Last Trip to Tulsa", previously released as the B-side to the single release of "Time Fades Away".

== Time Fades Away II and Tuscaloosa ==
In October 2009, Young told Guitar World that a disc titled Time Fades Away II would be included in the second volume of the Archives box set series, noting: "It's interesting because [Time Fades Away II] has a different drummer than what was on that album. Kenny Buttrey was in there for the first half, and Johnny Barbata came in for the second. It's a completely different thing, with completely different songs."

In January 2019, in an interview with Rolling Stone, Young mentioned the upcoming release of Tuscaloosa, a live album featuring the February 5th, 1973 show at Tuscaloosa, Alabama from the tour. The album was released on June 7, 2019. Young has since stated on his Archives website that Tuscaloosa is "as close as Time Fades Away II that we'll get".

== Track listing ==
All tracks are written by Neil Young.

Side 1
No.	Title	Recording date/venue	Length
1.	"Time Fades Away"	March 1, 1973, Myriad Convention Center, Oklahoma City, Oklahoma	5:36
2.	"Journey Through the Past"	February 11, 1973, Public Auditorium, Cleveland, Ohio	3:19
3.	"Yonder Stands the Sinner"	March 17, 1973, Seattle Center Coliseum, Seattle, Washington	3:17
4.	"L.A."	January 3, 1973, Myriad Convention Center, Oklahoma City, Oklahoma	3:11
5.	"Love in Mind"	January 30, 1971, Royce Hall, Los Angeles, California	2:02

Side 2
No.	Title	Recording date/venue	Length
1.	"Don't Be Denied"	March 28, 1973, Arizona Veterans Memorial Coliseum, Phoenix, Arizona	5:16
2.	"The Bridge"	January 4, 1973, Sacramento Memorial Auditorium, Sacramento, California	3:05
3.	"Last Dance"	March 29, 1973, San Diego Sports Arena, San Diego, California	8:47

Time Fades Away 50 bonus track
No.	Title	Recording date/venue	Length
4.	"Last Trip to Tulsa"	February 18, 1973, Louisiana State University Assembly Center, Baton Rouge, Louisiana	4:19

== Personnel ==
- Neil Young — vocals; guitar Tracks 1, 3-6, 8; piano Tracks 2, 5, 8; harmonica Tracks 1, 8; bass† Track 4

The Stray Gators

- Ben Keith — pedal steel, vocal Tracks 1, 6, 8; slide guitar Tracks 1, 3; vocal Track 1
- Jack Nitzsche — piano Tracks 1, 3, 4, 6, 8; vocal Track 1
- Tim Drummond — bass Tracks 1, 3, 6, 8
- Johnny Barbata — drums Tracks 1, 3, 4, 6, 8

Additional Musicians:

- David Crosby — guitar Track 3; vocal Tracks 3, 8
- Graham Nash — organ, vocal Track 8

† Neil Young credited as "Joe Yankee"

Additional roles

- Gary Burden – art direction
- Joel Bernstein – photography

== Charts ==
Chart performance for Time Fades Away
Chart (1973)	Peak position
Australian Kent Music Report	29
Canadian RPM 100 Albums	9
Japanese Album Charts	24
Norwegian VG-lista albums	16
Swedish Kvällstoppen charts	17
UK Albums Chart	20
US Billboard Top LPs & Tape	22
US Cash Box Top 100 Albums	9
US Record World album chart	17

2022 weekly chart performance for Time Fades Away
Chart (2022)	Peak position
Belgian Albums (Ultratop Flanders)	70

Singles

Chart performance for singles from Time Fades Away
Year	Single	Chart	Position
1974	"Time Fades Away"	US Billboard Bubbling Under the Hot 100	113
1974	"Time Fades Away"	US Cashbox Pop Singles	111
1974	"Time Fades Away"	US Record World Pop Singles	121

== Certifications ==
Region	Certification	Certified units/sales
United States (RIAA)	Gold	500,000^{^}
^{^} Shipments figures based on certification alone.
