= L.A. (Neil Young song) =

Song by Neil Young

from the album Time Fades Away
- Released: October 15, 1973
- Recorded: March 1, 1973
- Venue: The Myriad, Oklahoma City
- Genre: Rock
- Length: 3:11
- Label: Reprise
- Songwriter(s): Neil Young
- Producer(s): Neil Young; Elliot Mazer

"L.A." is a song written and performed by Neil Young from the 1973 album Time Fades Away, a live album noted for its abrasive experimentation and its "wild, agonized, deliberately jarring" vocals.

Johnny Rogan in his Complete Guide to the Music of Neil Young tells us that "L.A." was "Young's fantasy vision of the destruction of Los Angeles. There is an underlying glee in his apocalyptic vision that is both intriguing and disconcerting." Rogan also suggests that the song may have been written by Young a full five years before it was debuted during his 1973 Time Fades Away tour. Rogan talks about the song at greater length in the book Neil Young: Zero To Sixty.

In 2004 Rolling Stone rated "L.A." as Young's 74th greatest song, calling it a "tense, bitter rocker" that is a "tribute to 'the uptight city of smog' that made him a star."

Young performed L.A. 22 times on the Time Fade Away tour and wouldn't play it again until 2015

The Black Crowes performed the song on some legs of their 2005-2006 reunion tour, with lead guitarist Marc Ford handling vocal duties. Several of these performances saw official release via the band's deal with Instant Live. Although the Instant Live versions are now out of print, several shows have been made available via the band's official live download site, liveblackcrowes.com .

Jubilee recorded "L.A." (released in January 2008) as a B-Side on their single "Rebel Hiss" with the participation of guest drummer Troy Petrey.

Lukas Nelson, son of Willie Nelson, released a version of "L.A." on his CD, Promise Of The Real.

== Personnel ==
- Neil Young – guitar, vocals; bass (as "Joe Yankee")
- Ben Keith – pedal steel guitar, vocals
- Jack Nitzsche – piano
- John Barbata – drums
