= The Stray Gators =

American band

- Years active: 1971–1973; 1992
- Past members: Ben Keith Jack Nitzsche Tim Drummond Kenny Buttrey Johnny Barbata Spooner Oldham Danny Whitten

The Stray Gators was the name given by Neil Young to his supporting musicians from 1971 to 1973 and who backed him on the albums Harvest (1972) and Time Fades Away (1973). It consisted of Jack Nitzsche (piano), Ben Keith (steel guitar), Tim Drummond (bass) and Kenny Buttrey (drums); the latter replaced during the Time Fades Away tour by Johnny Barbata.

Former Crazy Horse rhythm guitarist Danny Whitten briefly joined the group in 1972 but was fired by Young due to his poor performance during tour rehearsals, precipitating his death from an accidental overdose immediately thereafter.

== History ==
While in Nashville to tape an episode of The Johnny Cash Show, Young was convinced to record some of his new tracks in Elliot Mazer's Quadrafonic Sound Studios. Since it was a Saturday night, Mazer scrambled to find musicians who were not working that night and was able to bring in Drummond, Keith, and Buttrey. Over two nights they recorded four tracks that would end up on Harvest.

Young then used frequent collaborator Nitzsche to arrange and produce two tracks with an orchestra. He then brought the three Nashville musicians and Nitzsche to his ranch in California to record the three electric-guitar songs in his barn. At some point, he dubbed this new group The Stray Gators.

After the release of Harvest, they appeared on the "War Song" single, credited to Young and Graham Nash. Outtakes from the Harvest sessions later appeared on the Journey Through the Past soundtrack and The Archives Vol. 1 1963–1972. The band appears on the Tonight's the Night song "Lookout Joe", which was recorded in late 1972, and with Neil Young on an early session recording of Joni Mitchell's "You Turn Me On, I'm a Radio" that was eventually released on Joni Mitchell Archives – Vol. 3: The Asylum Years (1972–1975).

In 1973, they backed Young on his Time Fades Away tour, though Buttrey was replaced mid-tour and on the album Time Fades Away by John Barbata. They ceased to operate as a unit after that tour, although Drummond and Keith continued to work individually with Young on subsequent projects. Thereafter, Nitzsche eschewed live performance in favor of a career as a prolific record producer and film scorer, culminating in the 1983 Academy Award for Best Original Song for "Up Where We Belong". Although he was estranged from Young after castigating the singer-songwriter in a 1974 interview and commencing a relationship with his former partner, actress Carrie Snodgress, they reconciled by 1986.

Young reconvened The Stray Gators for his 1992 Harvest Moon album, with Spooner Oldham replacing Nitzsche on keyboards. Nitzsche, however, did arrange the strings on "Such a Woman", as he had done on Harvest.

== Past members ==
Former members

- Ben Keith – pedal steel, slide guitar, vocals
- Jack Nitzsche – piano, vocals
- Tim Drummond – bass
- Kenny Buttrey – drums

Additional members

- Johnny Barbata – drums (1973; replacing Kenny Buttrey)
- Spooner Oldham – piano, vocals (1992)
- Danny Whitten – rhythm guitar (1972; hired between Harvest and Time Fades Away tour; fired during rehearsals)
