= The Needle and the Damage Done =

- Side B of the Canadian single

Single by Neil Young

from the album Harvest
- A-side: "Old Man"
- Released: April 17, 1972
- Recorded: January 30, 1971
- Venue: Royce Hall, UCLA
- Genre: Folk rock
- Length: 2:03
- Label: Reprise
- Songwriter: Neil Young
- Producers: Neil Young; Henry Lewy

Neil Young singles chronology
"Heart of Gold" (1972)	"The Needle and the Damage Done" (1972)	"War Song" (1972)

"The Needle and the Damage Done" is a 1972 song by Canadian-American singer-songwriter Neil Young. The lyrics describe the effects of heroin addiction on musicians Young knew, including his friend and Crazy Horse bandmate Danny Whitten, who would die of an overdose the same year the song was released. The money that Whitten used to buy the drugs was provided by Young. The song would preview the theme of Young's 1975 album Tonight's the Night, which would reflect on the fatal heroin overdoses of Whitten and Bruce Berry, a roadie for Young and Crazy Horse.

== Background and lyrics ==
"The Needle and the Damage Done" was first released on Young's 1972 album Harvest. Rather than re-recording it, Young selected a live version from January 1971 that featured him singing and playing acoustic guitar. It would appear on the compilation albums Decade in 1977 and Greatest Hits in 2004. On the handwritten liner notes for Decade, Young wrote of the song: "I am not a preacher, but drugs killed a lot of great men."

Young performed the song in a 2005 Nashville concert, with the version being included on Jonathan Demme's 2006 documentary Neil Young: Heart of Gold. The documentary's DVD includes Young's 1971 performance of the song from The Johnny Cash Show.

The song also appears on the 2007 album Live at Massey Hall 1971. On that album, Young presented "The Needle and the Damage Done" with the following introduction:

Ever since I left Canada about five years ago or so and moved down south, I found out a lot of things that I didn't know when I left. Some of 'em are good, and some of 'em are bad. Got to see a lot of great musicians before they happened, before they became famous, y'know, when they were just gigging, five and six sets a night... things like that. And I got to see a lot of great musicians who nobody ever got to see for one reason or another. But, strangely enough, the real good ones that you never got to see was... 'cause of heroin. And that started happening over and over. Then it happened to someone that everyone knew about. So I just wrote a little song.

== Personnel ==
- Neil Young – guitar, vocals

== Covers and cultural references ==
Bands that have covered this song on studio albums include Our Lady Peace, Duran Duran, Simple Minds, and The Pretenders.

Five Eight covered the song for their 1993 release The Angriest Man.

Tori Amos covered the song during her "Strange Little Tour" in 2001.

American post-hardcore band Thursday referenced the song's title in the lyrics of their single Understanding in a Car Crash in 2001.

Australian singer Lior covered the song in 2006 as part of youth radio station Triple J's Like a Version segment.

English folk singer Laura Marling covered it twice on her August 2008 tour of Australia, and on several dates during her 2010 tour of England, Marling has since recorded the cover on a limited edition 7" distributed as a part of the Third Man Records Blue Series.

Pearl Jam's lead singer Eddie Vedder covered the song at a Pearl Jam show on August 23, 2009, at the United Center in Chicago, Illinois. He dedicated it to Michael Jackson, to whom he grew up listening. Pearl Jam also covered the song during their Backspacer tour.

Jewel covered the song on The Howard Stern Show on May 24, 2010.

British Artist Pete Fowler's August 2013 solo exhibition, at Beach London Gallery, of cross-stitch embroidery was titled "The Needle and The Damage Done."
