= Old Man (song) =

- Side A of the Canadian single

Single by Neil Young

from the album Harvest
- B-side: "The Needle and the Damage Done"
- Released: April 17, 1972
- Recorded: February 6, 1971
- Studio: Quadraphonic Sound Studio, Nashville
- Genre: Folk rock; country rock
- Length: 3:24
- Label: Reprise
- Songwriter: Neil Young
- Producers: Neil Young; Elliot Mazer

Neil Young singles chronology
"Heart of Gold" (1971)	"Old Man" (1972)	"War Song" (1972)

"Old Man" is a song written and performed by Canadian rock singer-songwriter and guitarist Neil Young from his 1972 album Harvest. "Old Man" was released as a single on Reprise Records in the spring of 1972, reaching number 4 in Canada, and number 31 on the Billboard Hot 100 singles chart for the week ending June 3.

== Background ==
The song was written for the caretaker of the Northern California Broken Arrow Ranch, which Young purchased for US$350,000 in 1970 (equivalent to US$2,901,671 in 2025). The song compares a young man's life to an old man's and shows that the young man has, to some extent, the same needs as the old one. James Taylor played six-string banjo (tuned like a guitar) and sang on the song, and Linda Ronstadt contributed vocals.

In the film Heart of Gold, Young introduces the song as follows:

About that time when I wrote ("Heart of Gold"), and I was touring, I had also—just, you know, being a rich hippie for the first time—I had purchased a ranch, and I still live there today. And there was a couple living on it that were the caretakers, an old gentleman named Louis Avila and his wife Clara. And there was this old blue Jeep there, and Louis took me for a ride in this blue Jeep. He gets me up there on the top side of the place, and there's this lake up there that fed all the pastures, and he says, "Well, tell me, how does a young man like yourself have enough money to buy a place like this?" And I said, "Well, just lucky, Louis, just real lucky." And he said, "Well, that's the darnedest thing I ever heard." And I wrote this song for him.

He tells a similar story when introducing the song at a February 23, 1971 performance broadcast by the BBC (in which he says that he purchased the ranch from "two lawyers").

== Uses in popular culture and covers ==
- In 2005, Lizz Wright covered it on her live album Dreaming Wide Awake, recorded at Allaire, Shokan, New York the year before. It also appears in the film Lords of Dogtown.
- In 2008, during the memorial service for Heath Ledger, the song was chosen to be played with a slideshow of pictures from Ledger's life.
- Liam Finn (Neil Finn's son) & EJ Barnes (Jimmy Barnes's daughter) covered the song on the TV show RocKwiz.
- In 2011, Dallas Green, of City and Colour and Alexisonfire, covered the song at The 2011 Juno Awards, and post-grunge band Puddle of Mudd covered it on their covers album Re:(disc)overed. That same year Redlight King sampled "Old Man" on the album Something for the Pain. It was the first time Young had sanctioned a sample of this song.
- In 2015, Young appeared on The Tonight Show Starring Jimmy Fallon and performed the song with Fallon as his Neil Young character.
- In 2022, Beck covered Old Man to promote a Sunday Night Football match between the Tampa Bay Buccaneers and the Kansas City Chiefs. The song is a nod to quarterback Tom Brady, the oldest active player in the NFL (in 2022) at 45 years old. The line “24 and there’s so much more” refers to Brady and Kansas City quarterback Patrick Mahomes winning Super Bowls when they were 24 years old. After the commercial was released Neil Young posted a still image from the video for his 1988 anti-commercialization song "This Note's for You" in apparent protest of Beck's cover of Old Man being used in a commercial. Beck's cover was nominated for Best Rock Performance for the 65th Grammy Awards later that year.

== Charts ==
Chart (1972)	Peak position
Canada Top Singles (RPM)	4
US Billboard Hot 100	31
US Cashbox Top 100 Singles	26
US Record World Top 100 Singles	33

== Certifications ==
Region	Certification	Certified units/sales
New Zealand (RMNZ)	Platinum	30,000^{‡}
^{‡} Sales+streaming figures based on certification alone.
