= A Man Needs a Maid =

Song by Neil Young

from the album Harvest
- Released: February 1, 1972
- Recorded: March 1, 1971
- Studio: Barking Town Hall, London
- Genre: Symphonic rock; soft rock
- Length: 4:05
- Label: Reprise
- Songwriter: Neil Young
- Producer: Jack Nitzsche

"A Man Needs a Maid" is a song written by Neil Young that was first released on his 1972 album Harvest. It is one of two songs on Harvest on which Young is accompanied by the London Symphony Orchestra. It has appeared on several of Young's live and compilation albums.

== Lyrics and music ==
Music critic Johnny Rogan described the melody of "A Man Needs a Maid" as "haunting". AllMusic critic William Ruhlmann said the words were "an impressionistic musing by a man who is contemplating the start of a new romantic relationship".

The lyrics of "A Man Needs a Maid" have generated controversy over chauvinistic interpretations. This may be the result of Young using the term "maid" with two meanings, first as a housekeeper to cook and clean for him, then leave. However, the rest of the lyrics express Young's feelings of insecurity, trying to balance his need for an equal relationship with a woman against his fear of being hurt by that relationship and just "living alone and hiring help". This is apparent from the opening lines "My life is changin' in so many ways/I don't know who to trust anymore" before he starts singing about thinking of getting a maid. And even though he sings of the maid going away after doing the housework, after singing that "a man needs a maid" he goes on to ask "When will I see you again?" Music journalist Nigel Williamson adds another explanation for Young's desire for a maid, because he wrote the song while hospitalized after back surgery, so he literally did then need the services of a maid. Responding to the accusation of sexism from literal readings of the song, Young once pointed out that "Robin Hood loved a maid long before women's liberation".

Perhaps anticipating such criticism, Young remarked at an early performance of the song at the Boston Music Hall on January 21, 1971:

This is another new song. It's called "A Man Needs a Maid". It's kind of a . . . it doesn't really mean what it says. It's just the idea that anyone would think enough to say something like that would show that something else was happening. [short laugh] So don't take it personally when I say it. I don't really want a maid.

In the last verse, Young describes watching a movie and falling in love with the actress. This is an autobiographical reference to Young falling in love with actress Carrie Snodgress, who would become the mother of Young's first son. Young had become smitten by Snodgress when he saw her playing the role of the titular housewife in the movie Diary of a Mad Housewife.

== Background and recording ==
In live performances before recording Harvest, Young sang "A Man Needs a Maid" accompanying himself on piano. The earliest recordings were performed as a medley with the soon to be #1 hit "Heart of Gold". Later in the tour, "Heart of Gold" was sung separately with acoustic guitar. For the Harvest recording, Young added accompaniment by the London Symphony Orchestra, recorded at Barking Town Hall (later the Broadway theatre) in London in February 1971. Jack Nitzsche provided the orchestral arrangement. The Harvest recording begins with Young on solo piano with the orchestral accompaniment joining after the first statement of "a man needs a maid". Several critics, including Johnny Rogan, found the orchestral accompaniment to be overblown. Sam Inglis, however, claims that the orchestra "underline[s] the dynamics of Young's performance in the same way a film composer might reinforce the twists and turns of some high melodrama". As an example, Inglis notes the point at which Young cries out passionately for a "mai-ai-ai-aid" while "pounding" the piano, and the piccolo plays a "warning note" before the strings "soar upwards".

== Reception ==
Rolling Stone ranked "A Man Needs a Maid" as the #62 all time Neil Young song, calling it "a moving union of grandeur and vulnerability". Although some critics found the orchestral accompaniment to be overblown, Rolling Stone described it as "dramatic," and Bob Dylan liked it. Young has stated that "Some people thought that the arrangement was overdone but Bob Dylan told me it was one of his favorites. I listened closer to Bob." Young himself stated that the song is "overblown, but it's great". Village Voice critic Robert Christgau described the song as a "major" song that was "gratifying musically". Rolling Stone critic John Mendelsohn described it as being "particularly interesting" for how Young "treats his favorite theme — his inability to find and keep a lover — in a novel and arrestingly brazen (in terms of our society's accelerating consciousness of women's rights) manner". The New Rolling Stone Album Guide critic Robert Sheffield described the lyrics as being "unintentionally hilarious". Pitchfork critic Mark Richardson said the song is "one of [Young's] stranger creations, an affecting portrait of loneliness undercut with a clumsy, lunkheaded chorus refrain, the sincerity of which has never been quite clear".

Young included "A Man Needs a Maid" on his 1977 triple album Decade. A live version of the original version of the song containing "Heart of Gold" was included on Live at Massey Hall 1971 Another live performance of this version was included on the 2000 bootleg album There's a World.

The National Lampoon comedy troupe performed a song in the mid-70s "Old Maid (Southern California Brings Me Down)," which parodied "A Man Needs a Maid" with lyrics such as "I need someone to live with me, keep my bed warm...and sew patches on my jeans."

Emily Haines interpreted the song with "The Maid Needs a Maid".

== Personnel ==
- Neil Young – piano, vocals
- London Symphony Orchestra – strings
