= The Broadway (theatre) =

Theatre in Barking, London

- The Broadway Theatre
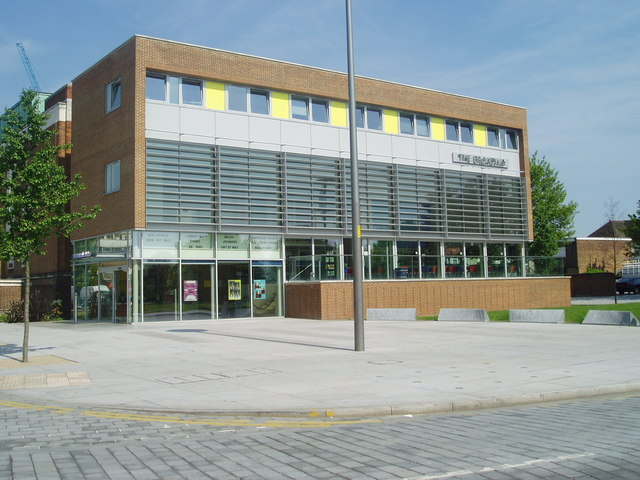
- Interactive map of The Broadway
- Address: Broadway; Barking, London. England
- Coordinates: 51.5355°N 0.0777°E
- Owner: London Borough of Barking & Dagenham
- Capacity: 341 seated on two levels (840 standing)
- Type: Receiving house
- Public transit: Barking

Construction
- Opened: 1961 (renovated 2004)
- Closed: 2024 (indefinitely)
- Architects: Herbert Jackson & Reginald Edmonds. Tim Foster Architects (2004 regeneration)

Website
- thebroadwaybarking.com

The Broadway is a performance venue in Barking town centre. The building was previously a facility known as Barking Assembly Hall, forming part of Barking Town Hall. It closed indefinitely in 2024 due to safety concerns. Prior to this closure, it doubled as a live working performance venue and one of four campuses for Barking & Dagenham College, hosting the college’s production and performance courses.

== History ==
The building, construction of which began in 1934 and was completed in 1961, was part of the Barking Town Hall complex. It was officially opened by Tom Driberg MP as Barking Assembly Hall in May 1961.

Sir Adrian Boult conducted the London Philharmonic Orchestra in the assembly hall on 26 November 1969.

In 1971, the renowned Canadian singer songwriter Neil Young recorded two tracks from Harvest, his best selling and most famous album, at the Broadway when it was known as Barking Assembly Hall (but is credited as Barking Town Hall on the album notes.) Young recorded these two tracks "A Man Needs a Maid" and "There's a World" for his Harvest album in Barking with Jack Nitzsche and the London Symphony Orchestra in March 1971. The album was released on 1 February 1972.

In December 1989, the boxing promoter, Frank Warren, was shot by a lone gunman as he arrived for a boxing match at the venue.

The building was remodeled as an arts centre and auditorium with a seated capacity of 341, designed by Tim Foster Architects, in 2002-2004. The refurbished venue then began hosting students from Barking and Dagenham College's Performing Arts School with the aim of improving access to arts facilities in the London Borough of Barking and Dagenham and the surrounding areas of east London. Barking & Dagenham College subsequently took over management of the theatre from the local authority in 2015.

The theatre closed in January 2024 following the discovery of reinforced autoclaved aerated concrete in the roof. Initially announced as a temporary closure, the venue updated in September 2024 that it would be closed indefinitely. In 2026, Barking and Dagenham Council announced Artsdepot as its preferred operator, with a partial reopening planned for 2027 and full reopening from 2028.
