= Carrie Snodgress =

American actress (1945–2004)

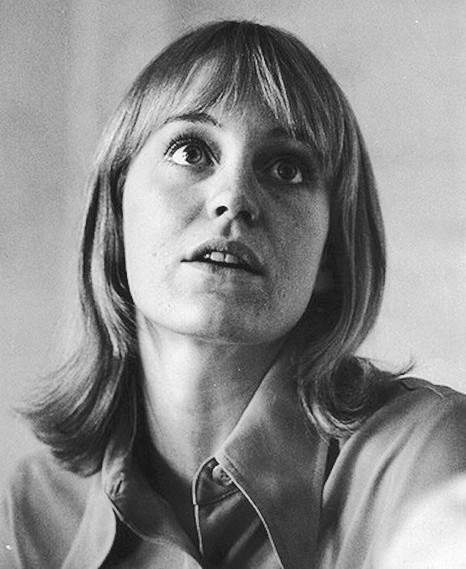
- Snodgress in 1970
- Born: Caroline Louise Snodgress; October 27, 1945; Barrington, Illinois, U.S.
- Died: April 1, 2004 (aged 58); Los Angeles, California, U.S.
- Education: Northern Illinois University; Goodman School of Drama; Art Institute of Chicago (M.A.)
- Occupation: Actress
- Years active: 1969–2004
- Spouse(s): Robert Jones (m. 1981; div. ?)
- Partner(s): Neil Young (1970–75); Jack Nitzsche (late 1970s)
- Children: 1

Caroline Louise Snodgress (October 27, 1945 – April 1, 2004) was an American actress. She is best remembered for her role in the film Diary of a Mad Housewife (1970), for which she was nominated for an Academy Award and a BAFTA Award as well as winning two Golden Globes and two Laurel Awards.

== Early life ==
Born in Barrington, Illinois, Snodgress attended Maine Township High School East in Park Ridge, then Northern Illinois University before leaving to pursue acting. She trained for the stage at the Goodman School of Drama at the Art Institute of Chicago (later DePaul University), graduating with a master's degree and earning the Sarah Siddons award as an outstanding graduate.

== Career ==
After some minor TV appearances, she made her film debut in an uncredited appearance in Easy Rider in 1969, followed by a credit in 1970 for Rabbit, Run. Her next film, Diary of a Mad Housewife (1970), earned her a nomination for Academy Award for Best Actress and two Golden Globe wins, as Best Actress in a Comedy or a Musical and New Star of the Year – Actress.

Between 1970 and 1978, Snodgress didn't make any acting appearances, in order to focus on raising her son. She returned to acting in 1978 in The Fury.

According to Sylvester Stallone, Snodgress was the first actress considered for the role of Adrian in Rocky. However, Snodgress declined the part because it was not well-paid. Rocky director John G. Avildsen cast Snodgress in two of his later films: A Night in Heaven and 8 Seconds.

Snodgress made her off-Broadway debut in 1981 as a replacement in John Ford Noonan's A Coupla White Chicks Sitting Around Talking. That year she married painter Robert Jones, but they separated within a few years. She appeared in All the Way Home, Oh, What a Lovely War!, Caesar and Cleopatra, Tartuffe, The Balcony and The Boor (all at the Goodman Theatre, Chicago); and Curse of the Starving Class at the Tiffany Theatre (in Los Angeles). Other films include Murphy's Law, White Man's Burden, Pale Rider and Blue Sky. She also worked extensively in television.

In her final film, Katja von Garnier's Iron Jawed Angels (2004) about the women's suffrage movement during the 1910s, Snodgress portrayed the mother of Alice Paul, played by Hilary Swank.

== Personal life ==
From 1970 to 1975, Snodgress lived with musician Neil Young and their son Zeke, who was born with cerebral palsy. Young's song "A Man Needs a Maid" was inspired by Snodgress, featuring the lyric "I fell in love with the actress / she was playing a part that I could understand." She also inspired the songs "Heart of Gold", "Harvest" and "Out on the Weekend" from Young's album Harvest, as well as "Motion Pictures" from the 1974 album On the Beach. She and Young split in 1975, and his song "Already One", which later appeared on his 1978 album Comes a Time, bookends their relationship.

Later, she and musician and film score composer Jack Nitzsche became lovers. Nitzsche had previously worked with Young on several albums. In 1979, Nitzsche was charged with threatening to kill her after he barged into her home and beat her with a handgun. He pleaded guilty to threatening her, was fined, and placed on three years' probation. She married Robert Jones in 1981.

=== Death ===
While waiting for a liver transplant, Snodgress was hospitalized in Los Angeles, where she died of heart failure on April 1, 2004, at age 58. She was interred at Forest Lawn Memorial Park, Glendale.

== Filmography ==
=== Film ===
Year	Title	Role	Notes
1969	Easy Rider	Woman in Commune	Uncredited
1970	Diary of a Mad Housewife	Bettina "Tina" Balser	
1970	Rabbit, Run	Janice Angstrom	
1972	Journey Through the Past	Herself	
1978	The Fury	Hester	
1980	The Attic	Louise Elmore	
1982	Homework	Dr. Delingua	
1982	Trick or Treats	Joan O'Keefe Adams	
1983	A Night in Heaven	Mrs. Johnson	
1985	Pale Rider	Sarah Wheeler	
1985	Rainy Day Friends	Margot	
1986	Murphy's Law	Joan Freeman	
1988	Blueberry Hill	Becca Dane	
1989	Chill Factor	Amy Carlisle	
1990	Across the Tracks	Rosemary Maloney	
1993	The Ballad of Little Jo	Ruth Badger	
1994	8 Seconds	Elsie Frost	
1994	Blue Sky	Vera Johnson	
1995	White Man's Burden	Josine	
1997	Up Above the World		Unfinished
1998	Wild Things	Ruby	
1999	A Stranger in the Kingdom	Ruth Kinneson	
2000	In the Light of the Moon	Augusta Wilhelmine Gein	Alternate title: Ed Gein
2001	Bartleby	Book Publisher	
2001	The Forsaken	Ina Hamm	

=== Television ===
Year	Title	Role	Notes
1969	Judd, for the Defense	Eileen	Episode: "The Crystal Maze"
1969	The Virginian	Josephine Delphinia	Episode: "Crime Wave in Buffalo Springs"
1969	The Outsider	Janet / Diane	Episode: "The Flip Side"
1969	The Bold Ones: The Lawyers	Megan Baker	Episode: "The Whole World is Watching"
1969	Marcus Welby, M.D.	Laura	Episode: "The White Cane"
1970	Medical Center	Mim Hoagley	Episode: "The Deceived"
1982	Quincy M.E.	Mrs. Vicki McGuire	Episode: "The Face of Fear"
1983	ABC Afterschool Special	Mrs. Cranston	Episode: "Andrea's Story: A Hitchhiking Tragedy"
1984	Highway to Heaven	Evelyn Nealy	Episode: "To Touch the Moon"
1986	Murder, She Wrote	Connie Vernon	Episode: "If a Body Meet a Body"
1988	Friday the 13th: The Series	Dr. Viola Rhodes	Episode: "Brain Drain"
1988	Crossbow	Lady Montal	Episode: "Ladyship"
1989	In the Heat of the Night	Mrs. Kroller	Episode: "Crackdown"
1990	Shades of LA	Lt. Armacost	Episode: "Pointers from Paz"
1991	Equal Justice	Marla Prentiss	Episode: "Courting Disaster"
1992	Civil Wars	Mary Esquavil	Episode: "Drone of Arc"
1992	Reasonable Doubts	Christine Anderson	Episode: "Try to Be Nice, What Does It Get You?"
1993	The X-Files	Darlene Morris	Episode: "Conduit"
1993	Murder, She Wrote	Irene Macinoy	Episode: "Love & Hate in Cabot Cove"
1994–95	Phantom 2040	Heloise Walker (voice)	Recurring role
1995	Chicago Hope	Mrs. Weber	Episode: "Every Day a Little Death"
1995	Sisters	Betty Merrill	Episode: "For Everything a Season: Part 2"
1998	ER	Mrs. Lang	Episode: "A Hole in the Heart"
1998	Touched by an Angel	Judy Bowers	Episode: "Miles to Go Before I Sleep"
2002	Judging Amy	Dr. Larabie	Episode: "People of the Lie"
2003	The West Wing	Mrs. Martha Rowe	Episode: "Red Haven's on Fire"

==== TV films and miniseries ====
Year	Title	Role
1969	Silent Night, Lonely Night	Janet
1970	The Forty-Eight Hour Mile	Janet / Diane
1971	The Impatient Heart	Grace McCormack
1978	Love's Dark Ride	Nancy Warren
1979	Fast Friends	Diana Hayward
1979	The Solitary Man	Sharon Keyes
1984	Nadia	Stefania Comaneci
1985	A Reason to Live	Isobel Bennett
1990	The Rose and the Jackal	Joan Pinkerton
1991	Mission of the Shark: The Saga of the U.S.S. Indianapolis	Louise McVay
1992	Woman with a Past	Mama
1994	Rise and Walk: The Dennis Byrd Story	Mrs. Byrd
1996	Death Benefit	Virginia McGinnis
1996	All She Ever Wanted	Alma Winchester
2004	Iron Jawed Angels	Mrs. Paul

== Awards and nominations ==
Award	Year	Category	Work	Result	Ref.
Academy Award	1971	Best Actress	Diary of a Mad Housewife	Nominated	
British Academy Film Award	1972	Most Promising Newcomer to Leading Film Roles	Diary of a Mad Housewife	Nominated	
Daytime Emmy Awards	1984	Outstanding Performer in Children's Programming	ABC Afterschool Special ("Andrea's Story: A Hitchhiking Tragedy")	Nominated	
Golden Globe Awards	1971	Best Actress in a Motion Picture – Musical or Comedy	Diary of a Mad Housewife	Won	
Golden Globe Awards	1971	New Star of the Year – Actress	Diary of a Mad Housewife	Won	
Laurel Award	1971	Best Dramatic Performance, Female	Diary of a Mad Housewife	Won	
Laurel Award	1971	Star of Tomorrow, Female	Diary of a Mad Housewife	Won	
National Society of Film Critics Award	1970	Best Actress	Diary of a Mad Housewife	5th place	
