= Soldier (Neil Young song) =

Song by Neil Young

from the album Journey Through the Past
- Released: 7 November 1972
- Recorded: 18 November 1971
- Genre: Rock
- Length: 3:39
- Label: Reprise
- Songwriter: Neil Young
- Producers: Neil Young; L.A. Johnson

"Soldier" is a song by Neil Young from the 1972 soundtrack album, Journey Through the Past. It was the only new track included on the album, and was later released on the 1977 compilation Decade, although it was slightly edited.

According to the Neil Young Archives Vol. 1 book (1945–1972), this recording is Neil solo on piano and vocal, recorded by L.A. Johnson inside a sawdust burner in a sawmill, Kings Mountain, California, on November 18, 1971. According to Neil Young's notes from the Decade 3-Record set(1977), the sounds in the background are of a roaring fire. This song is published by Silver Fiddle/BMI.
