= Heart of Gold (Neil Young song) =

1972 single by Neil Young

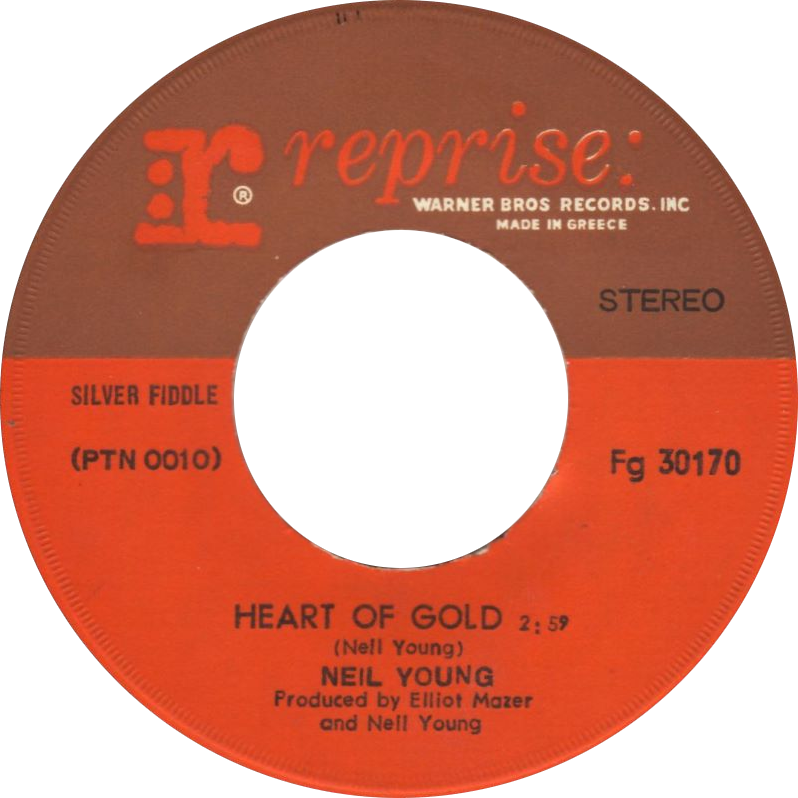
- Side A of the Greek single

Single by Neil Young

from the album Harvest
- B-side: "Sugar Mountain"
- Released: January 1972 (U.S.)
- Recorded: February 6–7, 1971
- Studio: Quadrafonic Sound, Nashville, Tennessee
- Genre: Folk rock; country rock; soft rock
- Length: 3:07
- Label: Reprise
- Songwriter: Neil Young
- Producers: Elliot Mazer; Neil Young

Neil Young singles chronology
"When You Dance I Can Really Love" (1971)	"Heart of Gold" (1972)	"Old Man" (1972)

Audio
- "Heart of Gold" by Neil Young on YouTube

Live video
- "Heart of Gold" (live) by Neil Young on YouTube

"Heart of Gold" is a song by Canadian singer-songwriter Neil Young. From his fourth studio album Harvest (1972), it is Young's only U.S. No. 1 single. In Canada, it reached No. 1 on the RPM national singles chart for the first time on April 8, 1972, on which date Young held the top spot on both the singles and albums charts, and No. 1 again on May 13. Billboard ranked it as the No. 17 song for 1972.

In 2004, Rolling Stone ranked it No. 297 on their list of the 500 greatest songs of all time, No. 303 in an updated 2010 list, and No. 259 in 2021.

== Description ==
The song, which features backup vocals by James Taylor and Linda Ronstadt, is one of a series of soft acoustic pieces which were written partly as a result of a back injury. Unable to stand for long periods of time, Young could not play his electric guitar and so returned to his acoustic guitar, which he could play sitting down. He also played his harmonica during the three instrumental portions, including the introduction to the song.

"Heart of Gold" was recorded during the initial sessions for Harvest on February 6–8, 1971, at Quadrafonic Sound Studios in Nashville, Tennessee. Ronstadt (who herself would later cover Young's song "Love Is a Rose") and Taylor were in Nashville at the time for an appearance on Johnny Cash's television program, and the album's producer Elliot Mazer arranged for them to sing backup for Young in the studio.

Young played this song in 1971 solo shows before recording it. At a January 19 concert (preserved on Live at Massey Hall 1971, released in 2007) he played it on piano, starting with "A Man Needs a Maid" and then segueing into this song. By the time of Harvest, he had separated the two songs and played "Heart of Gold" on guitar and harmonica.

Young wrote in the liner notes of his 1977 compilation album Decade: "This song put me in the middle of the road. Traveling there soon became a bore so I headed for the ditch. A rougher ride but I saw more interesting people there." This statement was in response to the mainstream popularity that he gained as a result of the number-one status of "Heart of Gold".

Young has stated that this song, as well as "Harvest" and "Out on the Weekend" from the same album, were inspired by his then blossoming love for actress Carrie Snodgress.

In 1985, Bob Dylan said he disliked hearing the song, despite always liking Young:

The only time it bothered me that someone sounded like me was when I was living in Phoenix, Arizona, in about '72 and the big song at the time was "Heart of Gold". I used to hate it when it came on the radio. I always liked Neil Young, but it bothered me every time I listened to "Heart of Gold." I think it was up at number one for a long time, and I'd say, "Shit, that's me. If it sounds like me, it should as well be me."

Upon the single release, Record World said that "Dylanesque harmonica and lyric content give this one more of a folk feel than [Young's] most recent work."

== Personnel ==
- Neil Young – guitar, harmonica, vocals
- Teddy Irwin – guitar
- Ben Keith – pedal steel guitar
- Tim Drummond – bass
- Kenny Buttrey – drums
- Linda Ronstadt – vocals
- James Taylor – vocals

== Notable covers ==
- James Last covered the song in 1972. It reached No. 17 on the Canadian RPM AC charts, December 30, 1972.
- Boney M. covered the song on Nightflight to Venus, released in 1978.
- A cover by Willie Nelson peaked at No. 44 on the Billboard Hot Country Singles chart in 1987.
- Roxette covered the song on their MTV Unplugged in 1993.
- Tori Amos covered the song on her album Strange Little Girls, released in 2001.
- Johnny Cash covered the song (with Red Hot Chili Peppers) on his 2003 posthumous box set Unearthed.
- Canadian Diana Krall included it as a bonus track in 2015 on her 12th studio album. Wallflower: The Complete Sessions.
- Ruth B performed the song in September 2017 for Young's induction into the Canadian Songwriters Hall of Fame.
- Fiona Apple released a cover of the song in April 2025.

== Recognition ==
In 2005, "Heart of Gold" was named the third greatest Canadian song of all time on the CBC Radio One series 50 Tracks: The Canadian Version.

== Charts ==
Chart (1972)	Peak position
Australia (Kent Music Report)	14
Belgium (Ultratop 50 Flanders)	30
Belgium (Ultratop 50 Wallonia)	17
Canada Top Singles (RPM)	1
France (IFOP)	31
Ireland (IRMA)	12
Japan (Oricon)	28
Netherlands (Dutch Top 40)	9
Netherlands (Single Top 100)	8
New Zealand (Listener)	10
Norway (VG-lista)	4
South Africa (Springbok Radio)	8
UK Singles (Official Charts)	10
US Billboard Hot 100	1
US Billboard Easy Listening	8
US Cash Box Top 100	1
US Record World Top 100	1
West Germany (GfK)	6

Chart (2025)	Peak position
Sweden Heatseeker (Sverigetopplistan)	14

== Certifications ==
Region	Certification	Certified units/sales
Denmark (IFPI Danmark)	Gold	45,000^{‡}
Germany (BVMI)	Gold	300,000^{‡}
Italy (FIMI)	Gold	50,000^{‡}
New Zealand (RMNZ)	4× Platinum	120,000^{‡}
Spain (Promusicae)	Gold	30,000^{‡}
United Kingdom (BPI)	Gold	400,000^{‡}
United States (RIAA)	Gold	1,000,000^{^}
^{^} Shipments figures based on certification alone.^{‡} Sales+streaming figures based on certification alone.

== Personnel ==
- Neil Young — lead vocals, acoustic guitar, harmonica
- Teddy Irwin — guitar
- Ben Keith — pedal steel guitar
- Tim Drummond — bass
- Kenny Buttrey — drums
- James Taylor — backing vocals
- Linda Ronstadt — backing vocals
