= Harvest (Neil Young album) =

1972 studio album by Neil Young

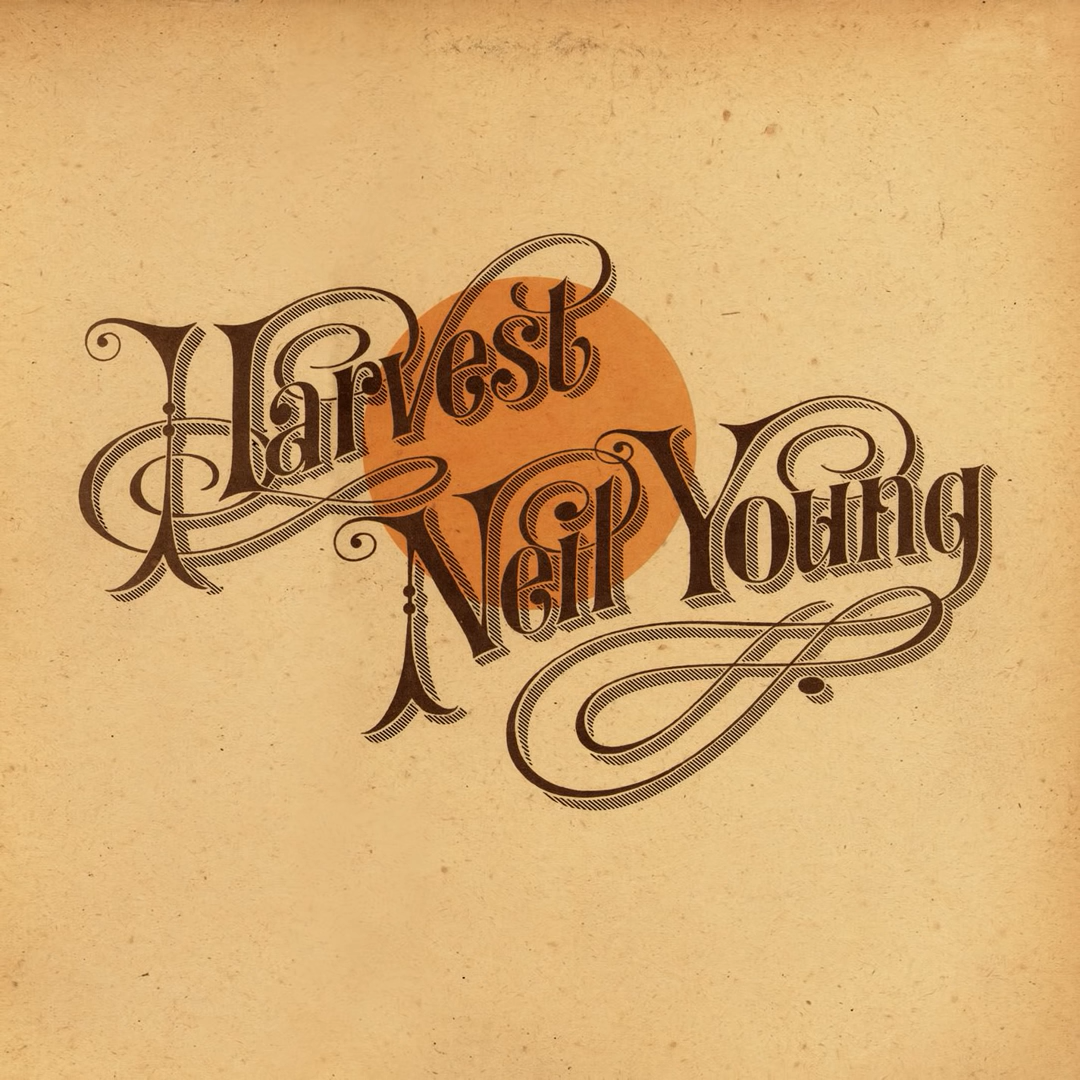

Studio album by Neil Young
- Released: February 15, 1972
- Recorded: January 30 – September 28, 1971
- Venues: Royce Hall, UCLA
- Studios: Quadrafonic Sound (Nashville, Tennessee); Barking Town Hall (London, UK); Broken Arrow Ranch (Woodside, California)
- Genres: Folk rock; country rock
- Length: 37:10
- Label: Reprise
- Producers: Neil Young; Elliot Mazer; Henry Lewy; Jack Nitzsche

Neil Young chronology
After the Gold Rush (1970)	Harvest (1972)	Journey Through the Past (1972)

Singles from Harvest
- 1. "Heart of Gold" / "Sugar Mountain" Released: January 1972; 2. "Old Man" / "The Needle and the Damage Done" Released: April 17, 1972

Harvest is the fourth studio album by Canadian-American musician Neil Young, released on February 15, 1972, by Reprise Records. It featured the London Symphony Orchestra on two tracks and vocals by guests David Crosby, Graham Nash, Linda Ronstadt, Stephen Stills, and James Taylor. It topped the Billboard 200 album chart for two weeks, and spawned two hit singles, "Old Man", which peaked at No. 31 on the US Billboard Hot 100, and "Heart of Gold", which reached No. 1. It was the best-selling album of 1972 in the United States.

The album has been described as "[contain[ing] some of the most arresting imagery of Young's career to date". According to The Times' deputy features editor Burhan Wazir, the album "evoked both the dying optimism of San Francisco's counterculture movement and the burgeoning cynicism of the Watergate generation."

The album has since remained Young's signature album as well as his best selling. In 2015, Harvest was inducted into the Grammy Hall of Fame.

== Background ==
In 1970, Young released both Déjà Vu with Crosby, Stills, Nash & Young and his third solo album, After the Gold Rush. The year also saw Young tour as a solo act and with both CSNY and his collaborators Crazy Horse. In the fall of 1970, Young released After the Gold Rush, divorced his wife Susan Acevedo, and purchased Broken Arrow Ranch in Redwood City, California, where he would live for the next four decades. While renovating his new home, Young injured his back, limiting his mobility and ability to perform electric guitar. Around the same time, Young would also begin his relationship with actress Carrie Snodgress. Young's new home and romantic relationship would inspire several new songs.

After completing After the Gold Rush, Young promoted the album through a series of solo acoustic concerts. After playing Carnegie Hall in December 1970, Young returned to his ranch for a break in touring. While picking up a slab of walnut, Young injured his back, which prevented him from standing up while performing, limiting him to playing acoustic music. Young explains in an August 1975 interview with Cameron Crowe for Rolling Stone that due to herniated discs, he was frequently in hospitals between After the Gold Rush and Harvest. He "didn't have any contact" since he could not move well, but David Crosby visited him, and it took 45 minutes to get to the studio, which was only 400 yards from his house. Most of Harvest was recorded in a brace, with "Are You Ready for the Country", "Alabama", and "Words" being done after his disc removal surgery.

Young embarked on a solo acoustic tour in January and February 1971 where he debuted many of the album's songs. A performance on The Johnny Cash Show led to collaborations with record producer Elliot Mazer and Nashville studio musicians. In Nashville, Young recruited a group of country session musicians, whom he would dub The Stray Gators to record his new songs. The resulting record was a massive hit, producing a US number one single in "Heart of Gold". The album's success caught Young off guard and his first instinct was to back away from stardom. He would later write that the record "put me in the middle of the road. Traveling there soon became a bore so I headed for the ditch. A rougher ride but I saw more interesting people there."

== Writing ==
In a post on his website, Young shares that much of Harvest "was written about or for Carrie Snodgress, a wonderful actress and person and Zeke Young's mother." In a radio interview, Young specifically cites "Heart of Gold", "Harvest" and "Out on the Weekend" as being inspired by his then blossoming love.

"A Man Needs a Maid" was also inspired by Young's budding relationship with Snodgress, whom he contacted after seeing her picture in a magazine. At a Philadelphia concert in October 2014, Young shared that the song was also inspired by a set of buttons which he thought were a light switch in a hotel he stayed at while touring with CSNY. He saw that the top one was labelled "MAN" and the other was labelled "MAID", and he immediately went to his piano.

"Heart of Gold" was Young's only number 1 hit in the United States. In 1974, he would tell a journalist that its composition was influenced by French song "Love Is Blue."

"Are You Ready for the Country?" was written shortly before being recorded for the album. It, like "Words" and "Alabama", was recorded to provide contrast to the acoustic songs on the album. Young explains in a post on his website: "Are You Ready for the Country?" was written at the ranch shortly before the barn sessions happened. It's a simple song based on an old blues melody that has been used many times. I thought it would bring some welcome relief from the other songs."

"Old Man" was inspired by Louis Avila, the caretaker of the Northern California ranch Young had recently purchased. He explains to an audience in January 1971: "This is a new song that I wrote about my ranch. I live on a ranch now. Lucky me. There's this old man who lives on it, that uh, he came with the place when I bought it. Ranches have foremen you know usually that sort of like stay there with the cows, no matter who owns it." He further describes Avila in his 2015 memoir, Special Deluxe:

Louis and Clara were each about sixty years old and Louis had a very leathery face from being out in the sun working the land his whole life. His hair was full and white and he talked slowly in a friendly way. Clara, his wife of about forty years, was a very nice, soft-spoken lady. They were very much in love and lived in a little house about two hundred yards from my cabin, just on the other side of the beautiful little lake. They were there the day I first saw the place. Louis stood a little off-center due to an injury he sustained while walking through a field one day when he stepped in a deep hole and put his back out. He never got it fixed. He just soldiered on. His manner was always casual, country.

"Alabama" is "an unblushing rehash of 'Southern Man'"; to which American southern rock band Lynyrd Skynyrd wrote their 1973 hit "Sweet Home Alabama" in reply, stating "I hope Neil Young will remember, a southern man don't need him around, anyhow". Young later wrote of "Alabama" in his autobiography Waging Heavy Peace, saying it "richly deserved the shot Lynyrd Skynyrd gave me with their great record. I don't like my words when I listen to it. They are accusatory and condescending, not fully thought out, and too easy to misconstrue."

"The Needle and the Damage Done" was inspired directly by an overdose by bandmate Danny Whitten, who would later succumb to his addictions. The song was also inspired by several artists Young had seen fall to heroin, as he explained to a January 1971 audience.

"Words (Between the Lines of Age)", the last song on the album, featured a lengthy guitar workout with the band. In his 2012 memoir Waging Heavy Peace, Young reveals that the song "Words" was inspired by Young's growing fame, and the first cracks in his relationship with Snodgress:

"Words" is the first song that reveals a little of my early doubts of being in a long-term relationship with Carrie. It was a new relationship. There were so many people around all the time, talking and talking, sitting in a circle smoking cigarettes in my living room. It had never been like that before. I am a very quiet and private person. The peace was going away. It was changing too fast. I remember actually jumping out the living room window onto the lawn to get out of there; I couldn't wait long enough to use the door! Words - too many of them, it seemed to me. I was young and not ready for what I had gotten myself into. I became paranoid and aware of mind games others were trying to play on me. I had never even thought of that before. That was how we did Harvest, in love in the beginning and with some doubts at the end.

== Recording ==
The album was recorded across several different sessions in multiple locations in 1971. "The Needle and the Damage Done" was taken from a live solo performance at UCLA on January 30 during a solo acoustic tour. Multiple sessions in February and April were held in Nashville with established local studio musicians, produced by Elliot Mazer. "A Man Needs a Maid" and "There's a World" were recorded with the London Symphony Orchestra with Jack Nitzsche on March 1. The album's electric tracks were recorded at Young's ranch in September.

Young engaged in a solo acoustic tour in North America and the United Kingdom in January and February 1971. During the tour, he played several new songs inspired by life on his new ranch or the beginnings of his romantic relationship with Carrie Snodgress. Several of the shows were recorded for potential release as a live album. Young arrived in Nashville in early February 1971 to perform on an episode of the Johnny Cash Show. Linda Ronstadt and James Taylor were also slated to appear on the broadcast.

While in Nashville, Young met record producer Elliot Mazer. Mazer had recently opened Quadrafonic Sound Studios in Nashville in a converted house. Mazer remembers: "The control room was the old porch. The living room and the dining room became the two live rooms, and the kitchen became a drum area. We called it 'Quadraphonic' as a joke, although it did have four speakers in the control room." Eager to record his new songs, Mazer helped Young assemble a band of local Nashville musicians. Young remembers:

I went on to Nashville at the end of the tour to do the Johnny Cash television show, which was new and really hot at the time. Bob Dylan had just done the first one, and everyone wanted to do it. James Taylor and Linda Ronstadt were doing the second show, and so was I. Everyone loved Johnny Cash; he was the real thing. The show was all about music, and it was cool, very real. While I was there I met Elliot Mazer, the record producer, and we went into the studio to try some studio versions of all my new songs. Tim Drummond was there, and he put together a great band, with Kenny Buttrey, John Harris, Ben Keith, and another guitarist who played some tasty things like the harmonics on "Heart of Gold." This was a great-sounding band. James and Linda came in and added some vocals; James even played banjo on "Old Man." That session was a solid beginning for Harvest.

Young would continue to work with Mazer and Drummond on several subsequent projects. Ben Keith would become one of Young's most frequent collaborators until his death in 2010. Several of the musicians had performed with Nashville bands Area Code 615 and Barefoot Jerry. At these first sessions in early February the band was able to capture "Heart of Gold", "Old Man", "Bad Fog of Loneliness", and "Dance Dance Dance". Linda Ronstadt and James Taylor also visited the studio to contribute to the sessions with Young. The three sat on a couch and recorded the background vocals for "Heart of Gold" and "Old Man". Taylor overdubbed a part for the latter song on Young's banjo guitar. Ronstadt remembers the session in a Mojo interview: "We were sat on the couch in the control room, but I had to get up on my knees to be on the same level as James because he's so tall. Then we sang all night, the highest notes I could sing. It was so hard, but nobody minded. It was dawn when we walked out of the studio." Mazer recalls Young's drive and the magical atmosphere:

Neil was very specific about what he wanted. When Neil Young plays a song, his body language dictates everything about the arrangement. Neil sat in the control room of Quadrafonic and played "Heart Of Gold". Kenny and I looked at each other, and we both knew it was a number one record. We heard the song and all we had to do was move Neil into the studio and get the band out there, start the machine and make it sound good. It was incredible!

At the end of February, Young traveled to London record a performance for BBC Television and to perform a concert at the Royal Festival Hall. While there, he recorded two more songs for the album with orchestra accompaniment. "A Man Needs a Maid" and "There's a World" were recorded by Jack Nitzsche with the London Symphony Orchestra March 1 at Barking Town Hall. Young recalled the sessions in Waging Heavy Peace: "I was in London and recorded "A Man Needs a Maid" and "There's a World" with the London Symphony Orchestra, produced and arranged by Jack Nitzsche. After hearing the playback in Glyn Johns's truck, where the pieces were recorded outside the Barking Town Hall, Jack said, 'I think it's a bit overblown.' We knew it was over-the-top, but we had done it and we loved it." In the liner notes to Decade, Young remembers Bob Dylan reacting favorably to the production.

In April, Young returned to Nashville to record "Out on the Weekend", "Harvest" and "Journey Through the Past" with Mazer at Quadrafonic. Mazer recalls Young being specific about what sound he wanted from the musicians during the sessions: "At one point, Neil said to Kenny that his hi-hat was too busy, so Kenny said, 'Fine. I'll sit on my right hand.' He played the whole take (for "Out on the Weekend") sitting on his right hand. Buttrey elaborates on his experiences playing with Young in Shakey:

Basically every drum part that I ever did with Neil are his drum parts, not mine. He said, 'I don't want any right hand' — no cymbals — which was really tough for me, because I was havin' to think about what I was playin' instead of lettin' it come natural. 'Less is more' is the phrase he used over and over. Only lick I ever came up with on my own is the high-hat on the "Heart of Gold" verse. Neil tells everybody what to play, note for note. If you play somethin' he doesn't like, boy, he'll put a look on you you'll never forget. Neil hires some of the best musicians in the world and has 'em play as stupid as they possibly can. It's just ultra-, ultra-simple, a laidback kinda thing nobody but Neil does, and if you're right with him it sounds great, and it sounds awful if you're not. If I can't see Neil's right hand when he's playin' guitar, then I'm not playing. His rhythm playing is just perfect—it'll feel like he's slowing down, but it's just the Neil Young feel. No drummer should ever hold Neil to a certain tempo, because if you put a metronome on it, you kill the Neil Young feel.

On August 11, Young went in for successful back surgery which allowed him to resume playing electric guitar with a band.

The electric-based songs were recorded in a barn at Young's ranch in California in September. Using a remote recording system, Mazer set up PA speakers in the barn for monitors rather than have the players wear headphones. This resulted in a lot of "leakage" as each microphone picked up sound from other instruments, but Young and Mazer liked the resulting sound. "Are You Ready for the Country", "Alabama", and "Words" were recorded in these sessions with Buttrey, Drummond, Keith, along with Nitzsche on piano and lap steel. Young named this band, which would accompany him on his tour in the winter of 1973, The Stray Gators.

Background vocals by Crosby, Stills & Nash were later recorded by Mazer in New York.

Mixing was done both at Quadrafonic and at Young's ranch. Young invited Graham Nash to review playback of the album as it was being completed. Graham Nash recalls the experience in his 2013 memoir, Wild Tales:

I remember the day that Neil asked me to listen to the record. No big speakers, but a boat. That's right, he asked me to get into a small boat and he rowed us both out into the middle of the lake. Once there he asked his producer Elliot Mazer to play the record. Neil was using his entire house as the left speaker and his huge barn as the right speaker. What an incredible record it was, and after the music stopped blaring, Elliot came down to the shore of the lake and shouted, 'How was that, Neil?' and I swear this is true, Neil shouted back, 'More barn!' That's Neil, no doubt about it.

During the production of the album, Young hired filmmaker David Myers to film the sessions. The footage was used in two documentaries, the 1973 film Journey Through the Past and the 2022 documentary Harvest Time. Harvest Time shows much of the recording process in Nashville, London, Los Angeles and New York. Dutch director Wim van der Linden also recorded footage of the artist at his ranch and in concert during the era for the Swing In German television documentary series.

== Release ==
The album cover was designed by art director Tom Wilkes. According to a Rolling Stone interview, Young had wanted the album sleeve to biodegrade after the shrink-wrap was broken, but was overruled by the record company on the basis of expense and the possible product loss due to shipping accidents. Mo Ostin mentioned this request at the 22nd Annual ASCAP Pop Music Awards.

On October 15, 2002, Harvest was digitally remixed and remastered for the DVD-Audio format. The new 5.1 mix was the subject of minor controversy due to its unconventional panning, with the vocals in the centre of the room and the drums in the rear speakers. Harvest was remastered and released on HDCD-encoded CD and digital download on July 14, 2009, as part of the Neil Young Archives Original Release Series. A 180-gram remastered vinyl edition was released on December 1, 2009, along with remastered vinyl editions of Young's first four albums. The remastered CD exists both as a standalone album and as Disc 4 of a 4-CD box set Official Release Series Discs 1-4, released in the US in 2009 and Europe in 2012.

== Critical reception ==
Retrospective professional reviews
Review scores
Source	Rating
AllMusic	4.5/5 stars
Christgau's Record Guide	B+
Encyclopedia of Popular Music	4/5 stars
MusicHound Rock	4/5
Pitchfork	9.3/10
The Rolling Stone Album Guide	4/5 stars
Spin Alternative Record Guide	7/10

Assessments by critics were not overwhelmingly favorable at the time. Rolling Stone's John Mendelsohn called the album a "disappointing retread" of earlier, superior efforts by Young, writing of "the discomfortingly unmistakable resemblance of nearly every song on this album to an earlier Young composition – it's as if he just added a steel guitar and new words to After The Gold Rush." A review in The Montreal Gazette gave the album a mixed verdict, calling it "embarrassing" in places but interesting lyrically, and singling out "Are You Ready for the Country?" as the record's best cut. Reappraising the record in Christgau's Record Guide: Rock Albums of the Seventies (1981), Village Voice critic Robert Christgau wrote: "Anticipation and mindless instant acceptance made for critical overreaction when this came out, but it stands as proof that the genteel Young has his charms, just like the sloppy one."

More recent evaluations of the album have been far more positive: in 1998, Q magazine readers voted Harvest the 64th greatest album of all time. In 1996, 2000 and 2005, Chart polled readers to determine the 50 greatest Canadian albums of all time – Harvest placed second in all three polls, losing the top spot to Joni Mitchell's Blue in 2000, and to Sloan's Twice Removed in the other two years. In 2003, a full three decades removed from its original harsh assessment, Rolling Stone named Harvest the 78th greatest album of all time, then was re-ranked 82nd in a 2012 revised list, and re-ranked 72nd in the 2020 list. In 2007, Harvest was named the No. 1 Canadian Album of All Time by Bob Mersereau in his book The Top 100 Canadian Albums. The album was featured in TeamRock's list of "The 10 Essential Country Rock Albums". It was voted number 93 in Colin Larkin's All Time Top 1000 Albums 3rd Edition (2000).

== Track listing ==
All tracks are written by Neil Young. Track timings are from the original 1972 vinyl release, catalogue number MS 2032.

=== Side one ===
1. "Out on the Weekend" (4:35)
  - Neil Young – acoustic guitar, vocal, harmonica; Ben Keith – pedal steel guitar; Tim Drummond – bass; Kenny Buttrey – drums
  - Recorded at Quadrafonic Sound Studios, Nashville, 4/2/1971. Produced by Elliot Mazer & Neil Young.
2. "Harvest" (3:03)
  - Neil Young – guitar, vocal; Ben Keith – pedal steel guitar; John Harris – piano; Tim Drummond – bass; Kenny Buttrey – drums
  - Recorded at Quadrafonic Sound Studios, Nashville, 4/4/1971. Produced by Elliot Mazer & Neil Young.
3. "A Man Needs a Maid" (4:00)
  - Neil Young – piano, vocal; with the London Symphony Orchestra
  - Recorded at Barking Town Hall, London, 3/1/1971. Produced by Jack Nitzsche.
4. "Heart of Gold" (3:05)
  - Neil Young – guitar, harmonica, vocal; Teddy Irwin – guitar; Ben Keith – pedal steel guitar; Tim Drummond – bass; Kenny Buttrey – drums; Linda Ronstadt – vocal; James Taylor – vocal
  - Recorded at Quadrafonic Sound Studios, Nashville, 2/8/1971. Produced by Elliot Mazer & Neil Young.
5. "Are You Ready for the Country?" (3:21)
  - Neil Young – piano, vocal; Ben Keith – pedal steel guitar; Jack Nitzsche – lap steel guitar; Tim Drummond – bass; Kenny Buttrey – drums; David Crosby – vocal; Graham Nash – vocal
  - Recorded at Barn, Broken Arrow Ranch, 9/26/1971. Produced by Elliot Mazer & Neil Young.

=== Side two ===
1. "Old Man" (3:22)
  - Neil Young – guitar, vocal; Ben Keith – pedal steel guitar; James McMahon – piano; Tim Drummond – bass; Kenny Buttrey – drums; Linda Ronstadt – vocal; James Taylor – banjo, vocal
  - Recorded at Quadrafonic Sound Studios, Nashville, 2/6/1971. Produced by Elliot Mazer & Neil Young.
2. "There's a World" (3:00)
  - Neil Young – piano, vocal; with the London Symphony Orchestra
  - Recorded at Barking Town Hall, London, 3/1/1971. Produced by Jack Nitzsche.
3. "Alabama" (4:02)
  - Neil Young – guitar, vocal; Ben Keith – pedal steel guitar; Jack Nitzsche – piano; Tim Drummond – bass; Kenny Buttrey – drums; David Crosby – vocal; Stephen Stills – vocal
  - Recorded at Barn, Broken Arrow Ranch, 9/26/1971. Produced by Elliot Mazer & Neil Young.
4. "The Needle and the Damage Done" (2:00)
  - Neil Young – guitar, vocal
  - Recorded at Royce Hall, UCLA, 1/30/1971. Produced by Henry Lewy & Neil Young.
5. "Words (Between the Lines of Age)" (6:42)
  - Neil Young – guitar, vocal; Ben Keith – pedal steel guitar; Jack Nitzsche – piano; Tim Drummond – bass; Kenny Buttrey – drums; Graham Nash - vocal; Stephen Stills - vocal
  - Recorded at Barn, Broken Arrow Ranch, 9/28/1971. Produced by Elliot Mazer & Neil Young.

=== Harvest 50th Anniversary Edition ===
==== Harvest Outtakes ====
1. "Bad Fog of Loneliness" (1:56) (from The Archives Vol. 1 1963–1972)
  - Neil Young – guitar, vocal; Ben Keith – pedal steel guitar; Tim Drummond – bass; Kenny Buttrey – drums; Linda Ronstadt – vocal; James Taylor – vocal
  - Recorded at Quadrafonic Sound Studios, Nashville, 2/6/1971. Produced by Elliot Mazer & Neil Young.
2. "Journey Through the Past" (2:32) (previously unreleased version)
  - Neil Young – guitar, harmonica, vocal; Ben Keith – dobro; John Harris – piano; Tim Drummond – bass; Kenny Buttrey – drums
  - Recorded at Quadrafonic Sound Studios, Nashville, 4/4/1971. Produced by Elliot Mazer & Neil Young.
3. "Dance Dance Dance" (2:34) (previously unreleased version)
  - Neil Young – guitar, vocal; Tim Drummond – bass; Kenny Buttrey – drums; Tony Joe White - electric guitar
  - Recorded at Quadrafonic Sound Studios, Nashville, 2/7/1971. Produced by Elliot Mazer & Neil Young.
4. "See the Sky About to Rain" (3:32) (previously unreleased version)
  - Neil Young – piano, vocal; Ben Keith – pedal steel guitar; Tim Drummond – bass; Kenny Buttrey – drums
  - Recorded at Quadrafonic Sound Studios, Nashville, 4/15/1971. Produced by Elliot Mazer & Neil Young.

==== BBC In Concert ====
1. "Out on the Weekend" (4:00)
2. "Old Man" (Intro) (0:30)
3. "Old Man" (3:37)
4. "Journey Through the Past" (Intro) (0:12)
5. "Journey Through the Past" (3:04)
6. "Heart of Gold" (Intro) (1:46)
7. "Heart of Gold" (3:32)
8. "Don't Let It Bring You Down" (Intro) (0:45)
9. "Don't Let It Bring You Down" (2:43)
10. "A Man Needs a Maid" (Intro) (2:23)
11. "A Man Needs a Maid" (3:55)
12. "Love in Mind" (Intro) (0:51)
13. "Love in Mind" (2:14)
14. "Dance Dance Dance" (2:26)
  - Neil Young – guitar (1, 3, 7, 9, 14), piano (5, 11, 13), harmonica (1, 7), vocal/spoken word
  - Recorded at BBC Radio Theatre, London, 2/23/1971. Produced by Stanley Dorfman.

== Personnel ==
Musicians

- Neil Young – lead vocals, lead and acoustic guitar, piano, harmonica
- Teddy Irwin – second acoustic guitar on "Heart of Gold"
- John Harris – piano on "Harvest"
- James McMahon – piano on "Old Man"
- James Taylor – banjo, backing vocals on "Heart of Gold" and "Old Man"
- Linda Ronstadt – backing vocals on "Heart of Gold" and "Old Man"
- David Crosby – backing vocals on "Are You Ready for the Country?" and "Alabama"
- Stephen Stills – backing vocals on "Alabama" and "Words"
- Graham Nash – backing vocals on "Are You Ready for the Country?" and "Words"
- London Symphony Orchestra – orchestra on "A Man Needs a Maid" and "There's a World"
- David Meecham – conductor on "A Man Needs a Maid" and "There's a World"

The Stray Gators

- Ben Keith – pedal steel guitar
- Jack Nitzsche – arrangements on "A Man Needs a Maid" and "There's a World"; lap steel guitar on "Are You Ready for the Country?"; piano on "Alabama" and "Words"
- Tim Drummond – bass guitar
- Kenny Buttrey – drums

Production

- Neil Young, Elliot Mazer – producer
- Henry Lewy – producer on "Needle and the Damage Done"
- Jack Nitzsche – producer on "There's a World" and "A Man Needs a Maid"

== Charts ==
=== Weekly charts ===
Weekly chart performance for Harvest
Chart (1972)	Peak position
Australian Albums (Kent Music Report)	1
Canadian RPM 100 Albums	1
Dutch MegaCharts Albums	1
Finnish Albums Chart	12
German Albums Chart	4
Norwegian VG-lista Albums	1
Spanish Albums Chart	4
Swedish Albums Chart	12
UK Albums Chart	1
US Billboard Top LPs & Tape	1
US Cash Box Top 100 Albums	1
US Record World Album Chart	1
Chart (1982)	Peak position
Japanese Albums Chart	6
Chart (1993)	Peak position
New Zealand Albums Chart	48
Chart (2022)	Peak position
Austrian Albums (Ö3 Austria)	38
Belgian Albums (Ultratop Flanders)	39
Belgian Albums (Ultratop Wallonia)	41
Italian Albums (FIMI)	54
Spanish Albums (Promusicae)	50
Swiss Albums (Schweizer Hitparade)	19

=== Year-end charts ===
Year-end chart performance for Harvest
Chart (1972)	Position
Dutch Albums Chart	1
German Albums (Offizielle Top 100)	10
US Billboard Year-End	1
US Cashbox Year-End	3
US Record World Year-End	1

== Certifications and sales ==
Certifications and sales for Harvest
Region	Certification	Certified units/sales
Australia (ARIA)	7× Platinum	490,000^{^}
Belgium (BRMA)	Platinum	50,000^{*}
France (SNEP)	Diamond	1,000,000^{*}
Germany (BVMI)	3× Gold	750,000^{^}
Italy sales 1972-1982	—	900,000
Italy (FIMI) since 2009	Gold	25,000^{*}
Netherlands (NVPI)	Gold	25,000
Norway (IFPI Norway)	Silver	20,000
Spain (Promusicae)	Platinum	100,000^{^}
Switzerland (IFPI Switzerland)	Platinum	50,000^{^}
United Kingdom (BPI)	3× Platinum	900,000^{^}
United States (RIAA)	4× Platinum	4,000,000^{^}
^{*} Sales figures based on certification alone.^{^} Shipments figures based on certification alone.

== See also ==
- Neil Young discography
- List of best-selling albums in France
- List of best-selling albums in Italy
- List of number-one albums of 1972 (Australia)
- List of number-one albums of 1972 (U.S.)
- List of UK Albums Chart number ones of the 1970s
