= Journey Through the Past (film) =

1973 film by Neil Young

- Directed by: Neil Young
- Produced by: L.A. Johnson
- Cinematography: David Myers
- Edited by: Neil Young
- Music by: Neil Young and the Stray Gators; Crosby, Stills, Nash & Young; Buffalo Springfield
- Release dates: April 1973 (Dallas); May 1974 (U.S.)
- Running time: 78 minutes
- Country: United States
- Language: English

Journey Through the Past is a 1973 film by Neil Young. Originally shot in 16mm format and then transferred for theatrical release the experimental film is a self-directed combination of concert footage from 1966 onward, backstage footage and semi-fantastic art film-like sequences. Young's directorial debut, it was received poorly by critics. The film premiered at the United States Film Festival in Dallas, Texas, in April 1973. It was released in theaters in the United States in May, 1974. The film was released on DVD and Blu-ray in 2009 with the Neil Young Archives.
