= Quad Studios Nashville =

Recording facility in Nashville, Tennessee

Coordinates: 36°8′50.2″N 86°47′43.6″W

Quad Studios Nashville was a four-studio recording facility established as Quadrafonic Sound Studio in 1971 on Music Row in Nashville, Tennessee, US. The studio was the location of numerous notable recording sessions, including Neil Young's Harvest, Jimmy Buffett's "Margaritaville", Joan Baez' "The Night They Drove Old Dixie Down", and Dobie Gray's "Drift Away". The studio's location has been the home of Sienna Recording Studios since 2014.

== History ==
=== Quadrafonic Sound Studio ===
Established by session musicians David Briggs and Norbert Putnam as Quadrafonic Sound Studio in 1971, the studio immediately became the home of many major recording sessions including Neil Young's Harvest album which included the single "Heart of Gold". Kris Kristofferson brought Joan Baez to the studio in 1971 to record her album Blessed Are..., including her hit recording of "The Night They Drove Old Dixie Down", and Dan Fogelberg recorded his debut studio album Home Free the following year. Other artists recording at Quadrafonic in its early years included Grand Funk Railroad, The Jackson Five, The Pointer Sisters, Joe Walsh and The James Gang, Pousette-Dart Band, and Dobie Gray, who recorded his R&B classic "Drift Away" at Quad Studios in 1972. A notable album from 1975 by Iguana entitled "The Winds of Alamar" was recorded at the studios with Gene Eichelberger engineering. This was possibly the first album purposefully recorded in the quadraphonic format, bypassing the more common stereo release. The album was later released with some changes in the song lineup by United Artists in 1976. In 1976, Jimmy Buffett recorded his biggest hit, "Margaritaville" from his best selling album Changes In Latitudes, Changes In Attitudes at the studio, and Buffett later donated a stained-glass window for the studio's upstairs bathroom.

The studios originally featured a Quad Eight mixing console and 16-track Ampex MM1100 two-inch tape recorder. In 1975, the owners replaced the Quad Eight with an MCI 500-series mixing console.

=== Quad Recording Studios ===
In 1980, Putnam and Briggs sold Quadrafonic for $1 million to Gerald G. Patterson, a developer from Atlanta, but the studio sat empty for several years until 1988 where Ron Kerr and a co-op group with various producers, engineers and musicians bought it and made it part of several other studios (SoundStage, Downstage, & Omni Studios) they owned and settled on the new studio name of Quad Studios. This group hired a young Belmont student named Kelly Pribble to open and manage the studio. Pribble was tasked with installing the Neve 8068 previously used by Jimmie Bowen at Soundstage, which had been replaced with an SSL SL 6000. Under Pribble's management the studio got so busy that a year that Pribble introduced drawings of his vision of what could be built with the building next door if the two building were combined.The group purchased the building next door. That building housed Music Row Magazine at the time and was owned by David Ross the editor and founder of Music Row Magazine. With this purchase and Pribble's layout there was an additional 2 overdub studios built, one outfitted with the purchase of a Sphere Eclipse C mixing console that was purchased from Doppler Studios in Atlanta, and the other over dub studio outfitted with a New Tac Magnum mixing console. In the newly purchased main building it was outfitted as a full tracking room with a custom 40-input Trident A-Range console. During the construction of this studio Pribble asked contractor Gary Bachman if the second floor in the main recording area could be taken out to open the space up from the floor to the roof. This was completed providing a very large acoustic area that drummers and engineers loved. This idea got around to producers like Jeff Lynne of ELO fame to come and work in this studio. The new tracking room had a Trident A-Range console installed that was previously used at Cherokee Studios purchased from Norbert Putnam after Putnam replaced it with an SSL in his new studio he built called "Digital Recorders" which was housed in the FISI building on Music Row, directly across the street from the United Artists tower. One unique feature different from every other Nashville studio was Quad had only one kitchen / lounge area that was shared by all four studios. This proved to be a great feature for artists, producers and musicians to meet over coffee creating a unique studio community. It was not uncommon for an artist or musician to work on other projects in a different studio after a casual meeting. It was also where a band like Lynyrd Skynyrd would be working in one studio and another production team would be working on Whitney Houston in another studio.

In 1999 Lou Gonzalez, owner of the similarly-named Quad Studios in New York City bought Quad Studios Nashville and remodeled and expanded the studios. The Trident A-Range console was sold to Butch Vig and installed in his "Smart Studios" in Madison Wisconsin. "Studio A" featured an 80-input SSL 9000J console, the "Neve Room", which was Quadrafonic's original studio, had a vintage Neve 8068 mixing console with Flying Faders automation. The 2 smaller studio suites eventually featured Pro Tools HD systems. Kelly Pribble left Quad Studios in 2000 where he relocated to London England and built an eight-studio complex called Kensaltown Studios with Swedish Record Producer Martin Terefe. Again, Pribble built a shared kitchen / lounge that provided London with a unique studio community feel that many hit record were recorded in by artists Jason Mraz, Train, James Morrison, Adele, Coldplay, A-HA, Yusuf Islam (Cat Stevens), KT Tunstall and many others . Artists recording at Quad Studios Nashville included Keith Urban, Taylor Swift, Lady A, The Fray, Jewel, Phil Vassar, George Strait, Toby Keith, T-Bone Burnett, The Dead Daisies and many more.

=== Sienna Recording Studios ===
In 2014, Quad Studios was purchased by hit songwriter Marti Frederiksen and Round Hill Music CEO Josh Gruss. The studios were renovated and restored, and renamed Sienna Recording Studios, with Round Hill establishing new business offices upstairs.
