= Elliot Mazer =

American audio engineer (1941–2021)

Elliot Mazer (September 5, 1941 – February 7, 2021) was an American audio engineer and record producer. He was best known for his work with Linda Ronstadt, Neil Young, Bob Dylan, The Band, and Janis Joplin. In addition, he worked on film and television projects for ABC and various independent studios, and taught at University of North Carolina at Asheville and Elon University.

== Early life ==
Mazer was born in New York City on September 5, 1941. His family moved to Teaneck, New Jersey, soon after he was born. Bob Weinstock, who was their neighbor and owner of Prestige Records, employed Mazer at the age of 21 to sort tapes and transport them to radio stations. He soon worked his way into the production process, ultimately creating the album Standard Coltrane in 1962 from a series of outtakes he had identified.

== Career ==
Mazer subsequently worked for Cameo-Parkway Records. There, he produced albums from artists such as Chubby Checker, Big Brother and the Holding Company (Cheap Thrills), and Linda Ronstadt (Silk Purse). Mazer later moved to Nashville, Tennessee, and co-established Quadrafonic Sound Studios. He was first introduced to Neil Young by the latter's manager, Elliot Roberts, in January 1971. Young was visiting the city to appear on The Johnny Cash Show and attended a dinner party hosted by Mazer, where the two conversed about artists and studios. Mazer was somewhat acquainted with Young's music only because his girlfriend at the time played After the Gold Rush incessantly. One month later, Mazer invited Young to the studio with the aim of persuading him to record a new album there. Young soon asked Mazer to work on Harvest, which was released the following year and began a decades-long partnership between the two. Mazer was responsible for assembling a band of Nashville session players to record with Young. This consisted of Tim Drummond on bass, Kenny Buttrey on drums, John Harris on piano, and Ben Keith on pedal steel guitar. This group would later be dubbed by Young as The Stray Gators; Keith would end up recording with Young for almost four decades. Most of Harvest was recorded at Mazer's studio, with some of it also recorded in Redwood City, California, at the Broken Arrow Ranch owned by Young. It was in the latter setting that Mazer observed Young shout his memorable quote "More barn!" as he played the album for Graham Nash, who had overdubbed vocals on the record. The album was ultimately honored in the Grammy Hall of Fame in 2015.

Mazer went on to produce Time Fades Away (1973), Homegrown (recorded in 1975 and released in 2020), Everybody's Rockin' (1983), and Old Ways (1985) for Young, whom he also familiarized with digital recording. He also worked with Gordon Lightfoot on several albums, producing Back Here on Earth (1968) and the live album Sunday Concert (1969). Another live album Mazer compiled was In Concert (1972) by Janis Joplin. He worked on The Last Waltz (1978) by The Band, which turned out to be their farewell performance. That album went along with the documentary film of the same name by Martin Scorsese, on which Mazer worked as audio engineer.

Aside from record producing, Mazer served as a consultant to Stanford University's Center for Computer Research in Music and Acoustics from 1976 to 1984. He designed the world's first all-digital recording studio and co-invented "D-zap", which was a device to detect possible shocking hazards in the studio. Mazer served as President of Artificial Intelligence Resources Inc. in the late 1980s. Here, he developed the AirCheck Monitoring system, which was utilized to recognize songs for radio and television. He and co-inventor Jon Birger subsequently sold the system to Radio Computing Services (RCS). He subsequently became senior vice president of radio computing services at RCS. Mazer also looked after the music on the Wide World of Sports program by ABC.

== Later life ==
Mazer taught a course on record production at the University of North Carolina at Asheville in the spring of 2010. He went on to teach music business and production at Elon University from 2011 to 2012. One of the last albums he worked on that got released before his death was Young's Homegrown, which had been recorded back in 1975. At that time, Mazer visited the United Kingdom after completing some of the mixing. He played a recording of the album to the head of Chrysalis Records, who proceeded to inform Mo Ostin that he was certain that this would become "another five-million seller". However, Young had a change of heart, and Homegrown was not released until June 2020.

Mazer died on February 7, 2021, at his home in San Francisco. He was 79, and suffered a heart attack and was afflicted with dementia in the years leading up to his death. Young praised Mazer on his website, calling him "[a] master in the studio". He went on to credit him for his work on Harvest, noting how the album "is one of my most recognized recordings and it all happened because of Elliot Mazer".

== Discography ==
Artist	Title	Label	Year
Crosby, Stills, Nash and Young	CSNY 1974	Rhino	1974–2014
Bob Dylan	The Basement Tapes (2013)	Columbia	2013
Bob Dylan & The Band	Live At Isle of Wight (1969)	Columbia	2013
The Whybirds	Cold Blue Sky	The Little Red Recording Company	2010
Bo Allen	Scarecrow	Left Turn	2009
Neil Young	Archives Volume 1	Reprise	2009
Jake Walker	Confidence Man	Left Turn	2008
Soulfege	Soulfege	Left Turn	2008
Chelsea On The Rocks	Feature Film Mix		2008
Scott McCurry		Left Turn	2007
Pegi Young (with Neil Young)	Pegi Young	Warner Bros/Vapor	2005
Toshi Reagon (produced by Craig Street)	Have You Heard (remix)	Righteous Babe	2005
Switchfoot	The Beautiful Letdown (remix-Dual Disk)	Columbia	2004
Frank Sinatra	and Jobim (remix-Dual Disk)	Reprise	2004
Frank Sinatra	September Of My Years (remix-Dual Disk)	Reprise	2004
Santana	Supernatural (remix-DVD-A)	Arista	2003
Santana	Shaman (remix-DVD-A)	Arista	2003
The Who	Tommy (remix consult-SACD & DVD-A)	Geffen	2003
The Rat Pack (Sinatra, Martin, Davis)	Live & Swingin’ (remix-DVD-A)	Reprise	2003
Frank Sinatra	At The Sands (remix-DVD-A)	Reprise	2003
Neil Young	Harvest (remix-DVD-A)	Warner Brothers	2002
Janis Joplin	Cheap Thrills (remix-SACD)	Columbia	2002
The Byrds	Live At The Fillmore West	Sony	2000
Gordon Lightfoot	Song Book (box)	Warner Bros.	1999
Janis Joplin	Boxed Set	Sony	1994
Neil Young	Lucky 13	Geffen	1992
Leonardo Music Journal	CD #1	Leonardo	1991
The Dream Syndicate	Live at Raji's	Enigma	1989
The Dream Syndicate	Ghost Stories	Enigma	1988
Jennifer Warnes/Rob Wasserman	Duets	MCA	1988
William Ackerman	Sampler '88	Windham Hill	1988
Dead Kennedys	Give Me Convenience	Alt. Tent.	1987
William Ackerman	Conferring With The Moon	Windham Hill	1987
Michael Hedges	Santabears First XMAS	Windham Hill	1986
Phil Aaberg, M. Hedges	The Shape of the Land	Windham Hill	1986
Scott Cossu	Reunion	Windham Hill	1985
Malcom Dalglish	Jogging The Memory	Windham Hill	1985
Neil Young (Home Video)	Solo Trans	Pioneer	1985
Michael Hedges	Watching My Life Go By	Windham Hill	1985
Uptones	Uptones	415	1984
Willie Nelson/Neil Young	Real Cowboys	Columbia	1984
Neil Young	Old Ways	Geffen	1984
Neil Young	Everybody's Rockin'	Geffen	1983
Mazer, Rush, etc.	Digital Domain	Elektra	1983
Tammy Comstock	Reason To Believe	US/CBS	1982
Red Steagall	Can't Hold A Workin' Man Down	US/CBS	1982
Janis Joplin	Farewell Song	Columbia	1981
Tubes	Sports Fans	Capitol	1980
Neil Young	Hawks & Doves	Reprise	1980
Jo Allen & The Shapes	Shimmy Shimmy	415	1980
Dūrocs	Dūrocs	Capitol	1979
Y & T	Alcohol	London	1978
Valdy	Hot Rocks	A&M	1978
Neil Young	Decade	Reprise	1977
Neil Young	American Stars & Bars	Reprise	1977
Juice Newton	Come To Me	Capitol	1977
The Band	The Last Waltz	Warner Bros.	1977
Dingoes	Five Times The Sun	A & M	1977
Frankie Miller	The Rock	Chrysalis	1976
Garfield	Strange Streets	Mercury	1976
Dane Donohue	I'm Easy, Restless Feeling (45)	Columbia	1976
David Soul	David Soul	Priv. Stock	1976
Barclay James Harvest	Time Honored Ghosts	Polydor	1975
Blue	Life In The Navy	RSO	1975
Andy Fairweather-Lowe	Spider Jiving	A & M	1975
Rab Noakes	Never Too Late	Warner Bros.	1975
Mike D'Abo	Broken Rainbows	A & M	1974
Leonard Bernstein	Concert for Peace	Columbia	1974
Neil Young	Tonight's The Night	Reprise	1974
Neil Young	Time Fades Away	Reprise	1973
Janis Joplin	Joplin In Concert	Columbia	1973
Rab Noakes	Red Pump Special	Warner Bros.	1973
Jack Nitzsche	St. Giles Cripplegate	Warner Bros.	1972
Jake Holmes	How Much Time	Columbia	1972
Neil Young	Journey Through The Past	Reprise	1972
It's A Beautiful Day	@ Carnegie Hall	Columbia	1972
Neil Young	Harvest	Reprise	1971
Tommy Live Charity Event	LSO, Solo Artists	Rainbow Theatre	1971
Jake Holmes	So Close	Polydor	1970
Area Code 615	Trip in the Country	Polydor	1970
Nick Gravenites	My Labors	Columbia	1969
Michael Bloomfield	Live at Fillmore West	Columbia	1969
Bob Dylan	Isle of Wight	Columbia	1969
Area Code 615	Area Code 615	Polydor	1969
Jake Holmes	How Are You?	Polydor	1969
Gordon Lightfoot	Sunday Concert	U. A.	1969
Linda Ronstadt	Silk Purse	Capitol	1970
Big Brother and the Holding Company	Cheap Thrills	Columbia	1968
Richie Havens	1983	Verve	1968
Ian & Sylvia	Full Circle	MGM	1968
Paupers	Ellis Island	Verve	1968
Gordon Lightfoot	Back Here On Earth	U.A.	1968
Jerry Jeff Walker	Five Years Gone	Atlantic	1968
Pozo Seco Singers	Shades of Time	Columbia	1968
James Cotton	Cotton In Your Ears	Verve	1968
Jake Holmes	Letter to Katherine	Capitol	1967
Len Chandler	Lovin' People	Columbia	1967
"ABC Wide World of Sports"	Music Supervisor		1966
"Death of a Salesman"	Music Supervisor		1966
"Shop on Main Street"	Music Supervisor		1966
"Juliet of the Spirits"	Music Supervisor		1966
El Trio Los Panchos	Sing Hank Williams	Columbia	1964
El Trio Los Panchos	Girl	Columbia	1964
Clark Terry	More	Cameo	1963
Teddy Wilson	Teddy Wilson	Cameo	1963
Rufus Thomas	Five On Eight	Cameo	1963
Maynard Ferguson	Come Blow Your Horn	Cameo	1963
Clark Terry	Tread Ye Lightly	Cameo	1963
Chubby Checker	Hooka Tooka/Loddy Lo	Cameo	1963
Chubby Checker	With Sy Oliver	Cameo	1963
The Tymes	To Each His Own	Cameo	1963
Jack Elliott	At Main Point	Prestige	1962
Lightnin' Hopkins	At Main Point	Prestige	1962
Pony Poindexter	Limbo Rock	Prestige	1962
Dave Pike	Bossa Nova Carnival	Prestige	1962
