= Kenny Buttrey =

American drummer and arranger (1945–2004)

Aaron Kenneth Buttrey (April 1, 1945 – September 12, 2004) was an American drummer and arranger. According to CMT, he was "one of the most influential session musicians in Nashville history."

Buttrey was born in Nashville, Tennessee, became a professional musician at age 11 and went on his first world tour at the age of 14 with Chet Atkins. He first worked with Charlie McCoy and went on to play with Area Code 615, best known for its song "Stone Fox Chase", which was the theme song for the BBC music programme The Old Grey Whistle Test in the 1970s, and Barefoot Jerry. Buttrey also played in the group Rig.

However, he was best known as a session player and worked with a number of well-known musicians including Elvis Presley, Bob Dylan, and Neil Young. He appears on Presley's He Touched Me; Dylan's albums Blonde on Blonde, John Wesley Harding, Nashville Skyline, and Self Portrait; and Young's albums Harvest, Tonight's the Night, Harvest Moon, Unplugged, Silver & Gold, and Tuscaloosa. Other work included sessions for Joan Baez, Jimmy Buffett, J. J. Cale, Donovan, Dan Fogelberg, Al Kooper, Leo Kottke, Kris Kristofferson, Gordon Lightfoot, Delbert McClinton, Mickey Newbury, Peggy Scott and Jo Jo Benson, Bob Seger, and Joe Simon.

Buttrey was a member of Neil Young's touring band, the Stray Gators. In 1973, he left the Stray Gators during their tour, with some reports saying he was fired, while others said the fan attention was too much; Johnny Barbata replaced Buttrey in mid-tour. In 1979, Buttrey provided the drumming for Chuck Berry's studio album Rockit. Also in 1979, he played drums on contemporary Christian singer Don Francisco's album Got to Tell Somebody.

Hit singles featuring Buttrey's playing include "Rainy Day Women #12 & 35", "Heart of Gold", "The Chokin' Kind", and "Margaritaville", but he was quoted as saying he was most proud of his drumming on Bob Dylan's "Lay Lady Lay". He was inducted in 2007 (posthumously) into the Musicians Hall of Fame and Museum. Buttrey died of cancer in Nashville on September 12, 2004, at the age of 59.
