= Tim Drummond =

American songwriter (1940–2015)

Timothy Lee Drummond (20 April 1940 – 10 January 2015) was an American musician from Canton, Illinois. Drummond's primary instrument was bass guitar and he toured and recorded with many notable artists, including Conway Twitty, Bob Dylan, James Brown, Eric Clapton, Neil Young, Crosby & Nash, Crosby, Stills, Nash & Young, Ry Cooder, J. J. Cale, Mother Earth, Lonnie Mack, Miles Davis, B.B. King, Joe Cocker, Albert Collins, Joe Henry, Jewel, Essra Mohawk, Jimmy Buffett, and many others.

Drummond co-wrote songs with many of the artists he worked with, including: "Saved" (Bob Dylan), "Who's Talking" (J.J. Cale), "Saddle Up the Palomino" (Neil Young), and "Down in Hollywood" (Ry Cooder). He is credited as the sole writer of "To Lay Down Beside You" on the 1971 album The Sounds of Simon, which went on to be covered by artists such as Esther Phillips, Dianne Davidson, Tracy Nelson, Terri Lane, and Rick Danko. He often played as part of the session rhythm duo Tim & Jim with drummer Jim Keltner.

== Collaborations ==
- Say It Loud – I'm Black and I'm Proud - James Brown (1969)
- Bring Me Home - Mother Earth (1971)
- Naturally - J. J. Cale (1972)
- Harvest - Neil Young (1972)
- Willis Alan Ramsey - Willis Alan Ramsey (1972)
- Rock and Roll Resurrection - Ronnie Hawkins (1972)
- Time Fades Away - Neil Young (1973)
- Wild Tales - Graham Nash (1974)
- On the Beach - Neil Young (1974)
- Okie - J. J. Cale (1974)
- Giant of Rock 'n' Roll - Ronnie Hawkins (1974)
- Wind on the Water - Crosby & Nash (1975)
- Zuma - Neil Young (1975)
- Whistling Down the Wire - Crosby & Nash (1976)
- American Stars 'n Bars - Neil Young (1977)
- Victim of Romance - Michelle Phillips (1977)
- CSN - Crosby, Stills & Nash (1977)
- Comes a Time - Neil Young (1978)
- Slow Train Coming - Bob Dylan (1979)
- Bop till You Drop - Ry Cooder (1979)
- Earth & Sky - Graham Nash (1980)
- Hawks & Doves - Neil Young (1980)
- Borderline - Ry Cooder (1980)
- Saved - Bob Dylan (1980)
- Shot of Love - Bob Dylan (1981)
- The Slide Area - Ry Cooder (1982)
- No Frills - Bette Midler (1983)
- 8 - J. J. Cale (1983)
- Building the Perfect Beast - Don Henley (1984)
- Old Ways - Neil Young (1985)
- Innocent Eyes - Graham Nash (1986)
- Oh Yes I Can - David Crosby (1989)
- Murder of Crows - Joe Henry (1989)
- Travel-Log - J. J. Cale (1990)
- Spellbound - Paula Abdul (1991)
- Lovescape - Neil Diamond (1991)
- Rush - Eric Clapton (1992)
- Number 10 - J. J. Cale (1992)
- Harvest Moon - Neil Young (1992)
- Unplugged - Neil Young (1993)
- Closer to You - J. J. Cale (1994)
- Pieces of You - Jewel (1995)
