= Ben Keith =

Musical artist (1937–2010)

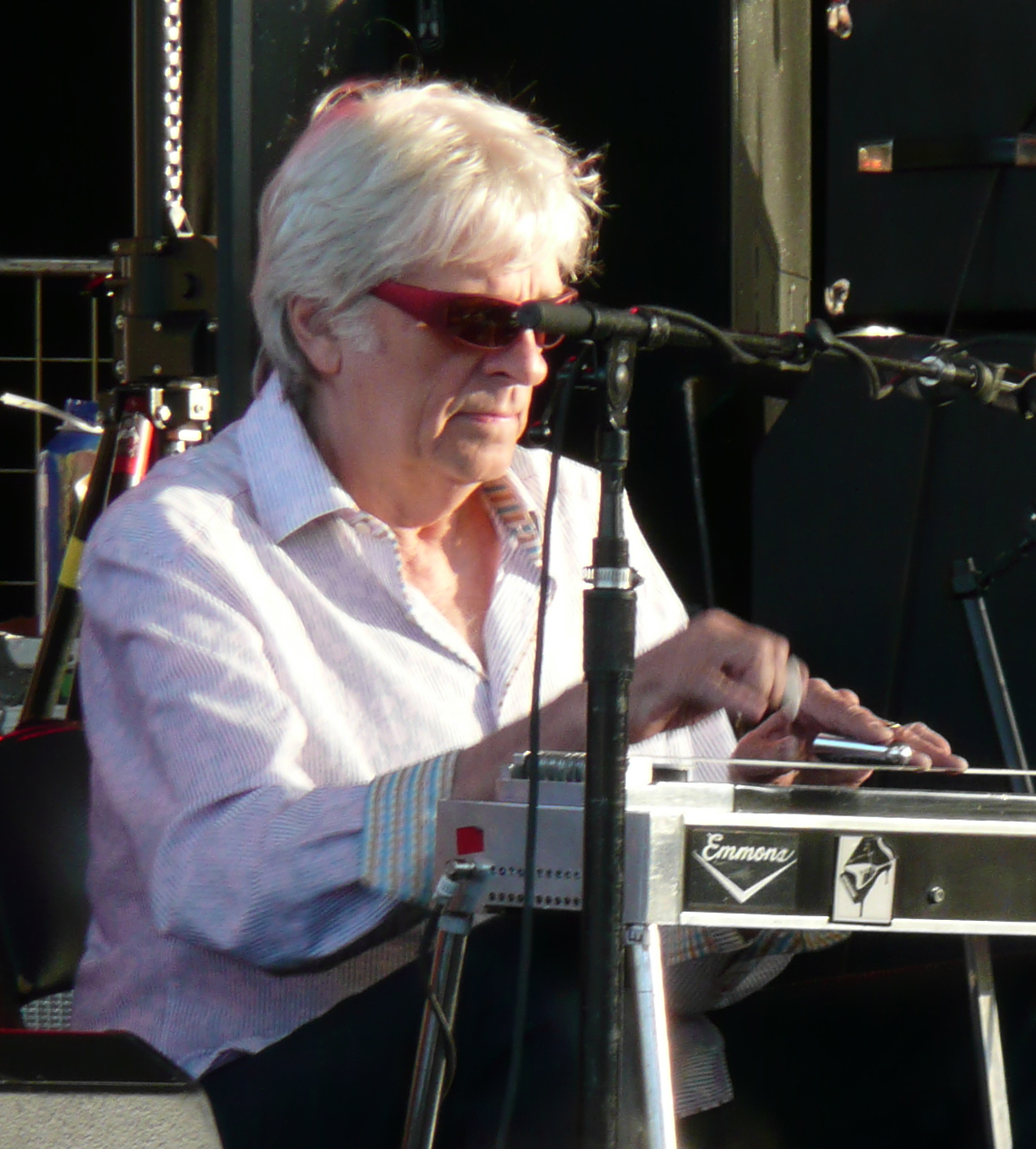
- Ben Keith on stage with Neil Young, Cologne 2009

Background information
- Born: Bennett Keith Schaeufele; March 6, 1937; Fort Riley, Kansas, United States
- Died: July 26, 2010 (aged 73) La Honda, California, United States
- Genres: Country, rock, pop, folk
- Occupations: Musician, singer-songwriter, producer, session musician
- Instruments: Guitar, pedal steel guitar, dobro, banjo, vocals, keyboards, piano, saxophone, bass
- Years active: 1950s–2010
- Labels: Reprise, Geffen
- Formerly of: Neil Young, Great Speckled Bird

Bennett Keith Schaeufele (March 6, 1937 – July 26, 2010), better known by his stage name Ben Keith, was an American musician and record producer. Known primarily for his work as a pedal steel guitarist with Neil Young, Keith was a fixture of the Nashville country music community in the 1950s and 1960s before working with numerous successful rock, country and pop artists as both a producer and versatile, multi-instrumentalist sideman for over four decades. Young affectionately referred to him as "Long Grain" (a joking word play reference to a variety of Uncle Ben's Rice and to Ben's height). Keith was inducted into the Musicians Hall of Fame and Museum in 2014.

== Biography ==
Born in Fort Riley, Kansas, Keith later relocated to Bowling Green, Kentucky, before working as a session musician in Nashville. Keith's first big recording in Nashville was playing on Patsy Cline's 1961 hit "I Fall to Pieces".

Keith first worked with Neil Young in 1971 on Young's Harvest album. They were introduced by Elliot Mazer, the album's producer, who was looking for a session player in Nashville on short notice. They collaborated for nearly 40 years, during which time Keith played with Young on over a dozen albums and on numerous tours. Young co-produced Keith's 1994 album Seven Gates, while Keith played the role of Grandpa Green in Young's movie Greendale, a film accompaniment to Young's 2003 album of the same name.

In addition to his work with Young, Keith worked with Terry Reid, Todd Rundgren, Lonnie Mack, The Band, Blue, David Crosby, Graham Nash, Paul Butterfield, J. J. Cale, Linda Ronstadt, Warren Zevon, Ian and Sylvia, Emmylou Harris, Willie Nelson, Waylon Jennings, Tompall Glaser, Anne Murray, and Ringo Starr. He served as the producer of Jewel's debut album Pieces of You, and also worked as a solo artist. He toured with Crosby, Stills, Nash & Young on their 2006 Freedom of Speech Tour.

Keith died of a heart attack on July 26, 2010, while staying at Young's Broken Arrow Ranch in Northern California.

== Discography ==
- To a Wild Rose (En Point, 1984)
- Seven Gates: A Christmas Album by Ben Keith and Friends (1994)
