= Borrowed Tunes: A Tribute to Neil Young =

Compilation album by Various Artists
- Released: August 2, 1994
- Genres: Folk rock, various
- Length: 1:13:07 (Disc 1), 1:13:45 (Disc 2)
- Label: Sony Music
- Producer: Various

Professional ratings
Review scores
Source	Rating
Allmusic	2/5 stars

Borrowed Tunes is a tribute album to Neil Young, released in 1994. The album was released as a two-CD set, one compiling acoustic songs and one compiling rock-oriented ones, although the two discs were also each sold individually. The album features a variety of Canadian musicians covering songs written by Neil Young. All profits from the album were donated to The Bridge School, which develops and uses advanced technologies to aid in the instruction of handicapped children. A second album called Borrowed Tunes II: A Tribute to Neil Young was released in 2007.

== Track listing ==
=== Disc 1: Out of the Blue: An Acoustic Tribute to Neil Young ===
1. Colin Linden, "Intro"
2. Hemingway Corner, "Tell Me Why"
3. Jann Arden, "Birds"
4. Crash Vegas, "Pocahontas"
5. Lawrence Gowan, "Heart of Gold"
6. Jim Witter and Cassandra Vasik, "Human Highway"
7. Jeff Healey, "Harvest"
8. The Breits, "Nowadays Clancy Can't Even Sing"
9. Lori Yates, "Helpless"
10. The Waltons, "Only Love Can Break Your Heart"
11. Amanda Marshall, "Don't Let It Bring You Down"
12. Prescott-Brown, "Comes a Time"
13. Malcolm Burn, "Pardon My Heart"
14. Rose Chronicles, "Old Man"
15. Cowboy Junkies, "Tired Eyes"
16. Rheostatics and Bourbon Tabernacle Choir, "Everybody Knows This Is Nowhere"
17. David Wilcox, "Transformer Man"
18. Stephen Fearing, "Thrasher"
19. Marc Jordan, "Borrowed Tune"

=== Disc 2: Into the Black: An Electric Tribute to Neil Young ===
1. Skydiggers, "Mr. Soul"
2. Barney Bentall and the Legendary Hearts, "Like a Hurricane"
3. Our Lady Peace, "The Needle and the Damage Done"
4. Junkhouse, "F*!#in' Up"
5. Blue Rodeo, "I've Been Waiting for You"
6. Big Sugar, "When You Dance I Can Really Love"
7. Colin Linden, "Tonight's the Night"
8. Treble Charger, "Albuquerque"
9. 54-40, "Cortez the Killer"
10. Chocolatey (Steven Page, Tyler Stewart, Steve Duffy), "Burned"
11. Philosopher Kings, "Coupe De Ville"
12. hHead, "Look Out for My Love"
13. Andy Curran, "Cinnamon Girl"
14. Wild T and the Spirit, "Down by the River"
15. Randy Bachman, "The Loner"
16. Mystery Machine, "Southern Man"
17. Art Bergmann and One Free Fall, "Prisoners of Rock 'n Roll"
