= I Believe in You (Neil Young song) =

1970 song by Neil Young

Song by Neil Young

from the album After the Gold Rush
- Released: September 19, 1970
- Recorded: August 5, 1969
- Studio: Sunset Sound, Hollywood, CA
- Genre: Folk rock
- Length: 3:24
- Label: Reprise
- Songwriter: Neil Young
- Producers: David Briggs; Neil Young

"I Believe in You" is a song written by Neil Young that was first released on his 1970 album After the Gold Rush. It has also been covered by other artists, including Linda Ronstadt, Robin Zander and Rita Coolidge. Coolidge's version was released as a single and was a minor hit in Canada.

== Lyrics and music ==
"I Believe in You" is a slow love song. Music critic Johnny Rogan describes it as being the closest Young came to writing an MOR ballad during this phase of his career. Rogan described the arrangement as being "sparse". To Allmusic critic Denise Sullivan, the "restraint" of Young's piano melody as well as the rest of the instrumentation adds to the song's poignancy.

Music author Nigel Williamson describes "I Believe in You" as being the song on After the Gold Rush which best fits the "confessional singer-songwriter mode", suggesting that it is similar to some James Taylor songs. Sam Inglis regards it as one of the best of Young's songs in which he tries to rationalize his behavior to women he has left. Although the title of the song seems to be positive, the lyrics suggest that he is unsure of his ability to love and reluctant to enter the new relationship. Ken Bielen describes the dilemma of the song as being "a matter of trust" and that the singer isn't even sure where love fits into his life. In an interview with Spin Magazine Young stated:

What am I talking about? "Now that you've made yourself love me do you think I can change it in a day?" That's a heavy one. That song has the most haunting lyrics. "Am I lying to you when I say I believe you?" That's the difference between the song and the poem. The song makes you think of the hook and the hook is "I believe in you", but the rest of it is in a whole other place.

On the other hand, Sullivan finds some of the lyrics to be reassuring to the woman he is addressing, such as the line "Now that you found yourself losing your mind are you here again?"

== Neil Young version ==
"I Believe in You" was one of the first songs recorded for After the Gold Rush. It was one of two songs from the album that Young was able to finish recording with Crazy Horse during the 1969 sessions at Sunset Sound in Hollywood, CA. "I Believe in You" was later included on Young's 1977 compilation album Decade.

=== Personnel ===
- Neil Young – electric guitar, vibraphone, piano, vocals
- Danny Whitten – acoustic guitar, vocals
- Billy Talbot – bass
- Ralph Molina – drums, vocals

== Cover versions ==
"I Believe in You"

Single by Rita Coolidge

from the album Rita Coolidge
- B-side: "Mud Island"
- Released: 1971
- Recorded: Sunset Sound, Los Angeles
- Genre: pop
- Length: 3:10
- Label: A&M
- Songwriter: Neil Young
- Producer: David Anderle

Rita Coolidge singles chronology
"Turn Around and Love You" (1969)	"I Believe in You" (1971)	"Fever" (1972)

Rita Coolidge released a cover version of "I Believe in You" for her self-titled debut album in 1971. Rogan described Coolidge's version as being more "sultry" than Young's. Coolidge also released it as a single, which was unsuccessful in the U.S. but charted at No. 38 in Canada. It also reached No. 16 on Canada's Adult Contemporary chart. Linda Ronstadt covered it on her 1973 album Don't Cry Now. Robin Zander covered the song on his 1993 self-titled album. Allmusic critic Tom Demalon described it as a "tasty cover." Fellow Allmusic critic Sullivan praised Zander's vocals but criticized the synthesizers and "cold" drum sounds on his version.
