= Almost Cut My Hair =

- Dutch release picture sleeve

Song by Crosby, Stills, Nash & Young

from the album Déjà Vu
- Released: March 11, 1970
- Recorded: January 9, 1970
- Studio: Wally Heider, San Francisco
- Genre: Folk rock
- Length: 4:31
- Label: Atlantic
- Songwriter: David Crosby
- Producers: Crosby, Stills, Nash & Young

"Almost Cut My Hair" is a song by Crosby, Stills, Nash & Young, originally released on the band's 1970 album Déjà Vu. It was recorded at Wally Heider Studios on January 9, 1970. "Almost Cut My Hair", thematically, is about keeping long hair as a signalling of defiance and protest during 1960s counterculture.

== Background ==
The song describes a real-life dilemma faced by many hippies and freaks: whether to cut one's hair to a more practical length, or leave it long as a symbol of rebellion.

== Composition and recording ==
It was written by David Crosby, and features solo vocals by Crosby, with the rest of the band joining in on instruments rather than on vocal harmony, as in many of their other songs. Unlike most of the tracks on Déjà Vu, the quartet and their studio musicians, Dallas Taylor (drums) and Greg Reeves (bass), all recorded it at the same place and time. It was one of only two songs from the album that Neil Young joined in on, despite not writing.

== Reception and legacy ==
Although the notion of long hair as a "freak flag" appeared earlier, notably in a 1967 Jimi Hendrix song "If 6 Was 9", Crosby's song has been credited with popularizing the idea of long hair as a deliberate and visible symbol of the wearer's affiliation with the counterculture, and opposition to establishment values. The song also evokes the singer's "paranoia" at seeing the police; James Perone writes that, "more than any other song of the entire era", it "captures the extent to which the divisiveness in American society ... had boiled over into violence and terror".

It became one of Crosby's signature songs, and "probably his most important political song". Crosby himself stated "It was the most juvenile set of lyrics I've ever written ... but it has a certain emotional impact, there's no question about that."

== Personnel ==
=== CSNY ===
- David Crosby – lead vocals, electric rhythm guitar
- Stephen Stills – electric lead guitar
- Graham Nash – organ
- Neil Young – electric lead guitar

=== Additional musicians ===
- Greg Reeves – bass guitar
- Dallas Taylor – drums, percussion
