= Cowgirl in the Sand =

Song by Neil Young and Crazy Horse

from the album Everybody Knows This Is Nowhere
- Released: May 14, 1969
- Recorded: January 18, 1969
- Studio: Wally Heider (Hollywood)
- Genre: Hard rock; acid rock
- Length: 10:06
- Label: Reprise
- Songwriter: Neil Young
- Producers: Neil Young; David Briggs

“Cowgirl in the Sand" is a song written by Neil Young and first released on his 1969 album Everybody Knows This Is Nowhere. Young has included live versions of the song on several albums and on the Crosby, Stills, Nash & Young live album 4 Way Street. It was covered by the Byrds on their 1973 self-titled album.

Like three other songs from Everybody Knows This Is Nowhere ("Cinnamon Girl", "Down by the River", and the title track), Young wrote "Cowgirl in the Sand" while he was suffering from the flu with a high fever at his home in Topanga, California.

== Lyrics and music ==
The song's lyrics are about a promiscuous woman, or possibly three different women across its three verses. Author Nigel Williamson describes the lyrics as "obscure and dreamlike, addressed to some idealized woman." Music critic Johnny Rogan describes the lyrics as "oblique", describing the woman as being both "idealistic" and "idealized" by the singer. Author David Downing suggests that this line reflects ambiguity as to whether increased sexual freedom is a blessing or a curse. Downing, however, feels that the next line, "it's the woman in you that makes you want to play this game", was already outdated when the song was released in the late 1960s. At the time of the song's initial release, Rolling Stone described the lyrics as "quietly accusative". Young himself claimed that "Cowgirl in the Sand" is about "beaches in Spain", though when he wrote the song he had never been to Spain. Author Ken Bielen has suggested that the song is about Young himself and his search for fame in Los Angeles.

"Cowgirl in the Sand", like "Down by the River", is largely based on a two-chord progression from a minor chord to a major chord. Both songs feature several guitar solos, which Toby Creswell characterizes as "distortion and chaos". Williamson claims that the song includes "some of the most powerful and untamed lead guitar playing ever recorded", while AllMusic critic Matthew Greenwald feels that the song contains Young's "most barbed guitar excursions".

Young sings "Cowgirl in the Sand" primarily in falsetto.

== Reception ==
Greenwald described "Cowgirl in the Sand" as "one of Neil Young's most lasting compositions" and "a true classic". In 2004, Rolling Stone critic Rob Sheffield called it and "Down by the River" the "key tracks" on Everybody Knows This is Nowhere, describing them as "long, violent guitar jams, rambling over the nine-minute mark with no trace of virtuosity at all, just staccato guitar blasts sounding as though Young is parachuting down into the middle of the Hatfield-McCoy feud."

== Personnel ==
- Neil Young – guitar, lead vocals
- Danny Whitten – guitar, backing vocals
- Billy Talbot – bass guitar
- Ralph Molina – drums, backing vocals

== Other appearances ==
"Cowgirl in the Sand" has been included on several Neil Young compilation albums, including Decade, Greatest Hits, and The Archives Vol. 1 1963–1972. Live versions have been included on The Archives Vol. 1 1963–1972, Live at Massey Hall 1971, Live at the Fillmore East, and Road Rock Vol. 1.

The Byrds covered "Cowgirl in the Sand" on their 1973 album Byrds. The song has also been covered by artists including Elvis Costello, The Magic Numbers, City and Colour, and Josie Cotton,. Cash Box said of the Byrds' version that the "spellbinding lyrics...are some of the prettiest ever."
