= Scott Dibble =

Scott Dibble may refer to:

- Scott Dibble (singer-songwriter), Canadian singer-songwriter, recording artist and producer
- Scott Dibble (politician) (born 1965), Minnesota politician
- Scott Dibble (Home and Away)
