= Hemingway Corner =

Canadian-American folk/rock band

- Origin: Toronto, Ontario, Canada
- Genres: Folk/Rock
- Years active: 1992–1996, 2010
- Label: Sony
- Members: David Martin; Scott Dibble; Mark Sterling
- Past members: Johnny Douglas

Hemingway Corner was a Canadian-American folk pop group, active in the 1990s.

== Biography ==
The group was formed in 1992 by two established singer-songwriters, David Martin and Johnny Douglas. Martin, from Atlanta, Georgia, was a musician and songwriter who lived in Nashville before moving to Los Angeles. Douglas, from Toronto, Ontario, was working as a session songwriter in Nashville, Tennessee. The two met while writing songs for Sony Music and released their self-titled debut album in 1993. They had hits on the Canadian pop charts with "Man on a Mission" and "Love, Love, Love", and received a Juno Award nomination for Best New Group in 1996. Choosing to return to his independent songwriting work, Douglas left the band the following year and later started another band called Beat Prophets.

While working on a Neil Young tribute album, Borrowed Tunes, the Skydiggers introduced Martin to Scott Dibble (from the Toronto band Watertown) and Mark Sterling from Edmonton, Alberta. They recorded a cover of "Tell Me Why" for the tribute album as a newly revamped Hemingway Corner. With some material already written by Dibble and Sterling, the band released a follow-up album, Under the Big Sky in 1995. The band initially supported the album by touring as an opening act for Jann Arden in 1995, during which Dibble would also perform as the duet vocalist on Arden's hit "Unloved". Three more singles, "Big Sky", "Tell Me Why", and "Watch Over You", were successful on the charts before the band dissolved in late 1996. "Watch Over You" received a SOCAN Award in 1997 as one of the ten most-played Canadian songs on radio that year.

They reunited in 2010 to record the album Speed of Life.

Martin is still an active songwriter, having penned tunes for Edwin, including co-writing the hit "Alive" from Edwin's debut Another Spin Around the Sun, playing on the follow-up album Edwin & the Pressure, and writing for country singer Tara Lyn Hart.

Mark Sterling is also actively songwriting, having released three solo albums including his self-titled debut (1996), The Well (1999) and Take From It What You Need (2009). He also worked with young country singer Adam Gregory for his debut album The Way I'm Made.

== Discography ==
=== Albums ===
Year	Album	CAN Country
1993	Hemingway Corner	—
1995	Under the Big Sky	37
2010	Speed of Life	*

=== Singles ===
Year	Title	Chart Positions			Album
Year	Title	CAN AC	CAN	CAN Country	Album
1993	"Man on a Mission"	15	11	73	Hemingway Corner
1993	"So Long JFK"	27	36	—	Hemingway Corner
1994	"Love Love Love"	15	19	—	Hemingway Corner
1994	"Ride It Out"	6	18	—	Hemingway Corner
1994	"King of New York"	25	47	—	Hemingway Corner
1994	"Tell Me Why"	15	37	37	Borrowed Tunes: A Tribute to Neil Young
1995	"Big Sky"	1	18	—	Under the Big Sky
1995	"Watch Over You"	7	21	—	Under the Big Sky
1996	"Make It Up as You Go"	13	18	—	Under the Big Sky
1996	"Wild Honey"	36	—	—	Under the Big Sky
2010	"Think About Love"	*	—	*	Speed of Life
