= After the Gold Rush =

1970 studio album by Neil Young

Studio album by Neil Young
- Released: September 19, 1970
- Recorded: August 2, 1969 – June 30, 1970
- Studios: Sunset Sound, Hollywood, California; Sound City, Hollywood, California; Redwood Studios, Topanga, California; Neil Young’s home
- Genres: Folk rock; country folk; country rock
- Length: 34:32
- Label: Reprise: RS 6383
- Producers: Neil Young; David Briggs with Kendall Pacios

Neil Young chronology
| Everybody Knows This Is Nowhere (1969) | After the Gold Rush (1970) | Harvest (1972) |

Singles from After the Gold Rush
- 1. "Oh Lonesome Me" / "I've Been Waiting for You" Released: 1969; 2. "Only Love Can Break Your Heart" / "Birds" Released: October 19, 1970; 3. "When You Dance I Can Really Love" / "Sugar Mountain" Released: March 1971

After the Gold Rush is the third studio album by the Canadian-American musician Neil Young, released in September 1970 on Reprise Records. It is one of four high-profile solo albums released by the members of folk rock group Crosby, Stills, Nash & Young in the wake of their chart-topping 1970 album Déjà Vu. Young's album consists mainly of country folk music along with several rock tracks, including "Southern Man". The material was inspired by the unproduced Dean Stockwell and Herb Bermann screenplay After the Gold Rush.

After the Gold Rush entered Billboard Top Pop Albums chart on September 19, and peaked at number eight in October. Two of the three singles taken from the album, "Only Love Can Break Your Heart" and "When You Dance I Can Really Love", made it to number 33 and number 93 respectively on the Billboard Hot 100. Despite a mixed initial reaction, the album has since appeared on a number of greatest albums of all time lists.

In 2014, the album was inducted into the Grammy Hall of Fame.

== Background ==
Young recorded the album while living in Topanga Canyon, an artistic community in Southern California. It was largely recorded in his home studio there. Songs on the album were influenced by people he met while living there, including producer David Briggs, Young's then wife, Susan Acevedo, and actor Dean Stockwell, whom he met through Susan. The album was recorded with members of both of his associated groups at the time, Crazy Horse and Crosby, Stills, Nash & Young, as well as the first appearance by long-time collaborator Nils Lofgren. By the time the album was released, however, Young had split with Susan and had moved to his Broken Arrow Ranch in Northern California, where he would record many of his subsequent albums.

== Writing ==
Songs on the album were inspired by a screenplay written by Dean Stockwell and Herb Bermann also titled After the Gold Rush. The screenplay's plot involves an apocalyptic ecological disaster that washes away the Topanga Canyon hippie community. Stockwell, a lifelong friend of Young, was also part of the Topanga Canyon artist culture of the time. Mutual friend Dennis Hopper encouraged Stockwell to write his own screenplay in wake of Hopper's success with Easy Rider. Stockwell recalls writing the script:

Dennis very strongly urged me to write a screenplay, and he would get it produced. I came back home to Topanga Canyon and wrote After The Gold Rush. Neil was living in Topanga then too, and a copy of it somehow got to him. He had had writer's block for months, and his record company was after him. And after he read this screenplay, he wrote the After the Gold Rush album in three weeks.

Young recalls coming in contact with the script in his 2012 memoir Waging Heavy Peace:

When I returned to Topanga, Dean Stockwell came by the house with a screenplay called After the Gold Rush. He had cowritten it with Herb Bermann and wanted to know if I could do the music for it. I read the screenplay and kept it around for a while. I was writing a lot of songs at the time, and some of them seemed like they would fit right in with this story. The song "After the Gold Rush" was written to go along with the story’s main character as he carried the tree of life through Topanga Canyon to the ocean. One day Dean brought an executive from Universal Studios to my house to meet me. It looked like the project was going to happen, and I thought it would really be a good movie. It was a little off-the-wall and not a normal type of Hollywood story. I was really into it. Apparently the studio wasn't, because nothing more ever happened.

In Young's biography Shakey, the script, now lost, is described as an end of the world movie which culminates in a tidal wave crashing into local music venue and hangout The Topanga Corral. Stockwell explains, "I was gonna write a movie that was personal, a Jungian self-discovery of the gnosis. It involved the Kabala; it involved a lot of arcane stuff." In a December 1995 interview with Nick Kent for Mojo, Young recalled:

It was all about the day of the great earthquake in Topanga Canyon when a great wave of water flooded the place. It was a pretty 'off-the-wall' concept, they tried to get some money from Universal Pictures. But that fell through because it was too much of an 'art' project. I think, had it been made, it would stand as a contemporary to Easy Rider and it would have had a similar effect. The script itself was full of imagery, 'change'. It was very unique actually. I really wish that movie had been made, because it could have really defined an important moment in the culture.

Ultimately, only two songs on the album were directly influenced by or had been intended for use in the film: "After the Gold Rush" and "Cripple Creek Ferry". The lyrics to "After the Gold Rush" were inspired by a dream and consider a future when mankind uses space travel to perpetuate the species in wake of environmental destruction.

The chorus of "Tell Me Why" features the memorable chorus question "Tell me why/ Is it hard to make arrangements with yourself/ When you're old enough to repay/ But young enough to sell?" Young shared in a June 1988 interview for Spin that the lyrics lost meaning for him over time, and made it difficult to sing the song live:

That's a hell of a question, isn't it? I don't understand it. It sounds like gibberish to me. I stopped singing that song because when I get to that line I go, what the fuck am I talking about? You know, I don't edit my songs. I knew something was happening at the time that I wrote it to make that right, but I can't remember what it is and it doesn't apply to what I'm doing now. "I Am a Child" is like that. What is the color when black is burnt? It's a charcoal kind of color, I guess, but what the fuck does that mean? I ask myself over and over, what the fuck am I talking about?

The song "Only Love Can Break Your Heart" was written for Graham Nash in the aftermath of his breakup with Joni Mitchell. Nash would tell Constant Meijers in September 1974: "I'd broken up with Joni and Neil came to me and said he'd written a song for me, because he knew exactly how I felt. Joni is one of those people who can't make a good relationship last. When we were doing alright, she quit."

The lyrics to "Southern Man" address slavery and segregation. The intensity of the song was influenced by conflict with Young's then wife, Susan Acevedo: "'Southern Man' was an angry song. I wrote 'Southern Man' in my studio in Topanga. Susan was angry at me for some reason." "Those girls always get jealous when you're working on something with great intensity. Susan, who was a lot older than me, was very jealous. One morning, I got up early to work on 'Southern Man' in the studio, she threw breakfast against the door. When I opened the door to see what was going on, she threw the coffee at me."

"Oh Lonesome Me" is a cover of the 1957 Don Gibson song, recorded in a somber and radically different arrangement than the original. Young's arrangement dates from his coffeehouse folk days in Toronto in late 1965: "I wanted to give the acoustic solo thing a try in the Village (Yorkville). I took my acoustic twelve-string to a few gigs and got some bad reviews. I had an arrangement of 'Oh Lonesome Me' that I really liked, and people laughed at it, thinking it was a parody or something. I used it on 'After the Gold Rush', and that worked." The song is the first recording by Young to feature harmonica, as well as the first song Young recorded that he didn't write himself. The song was released as a single in advance of the album in February 1970.

The lyrics to "Don't Let It Bring You Down" deal with falling into depression, and how new experiences or acquaintances can snap you back out. Young explains to Spin in 1988: "Every once in awhile something could happen, especially when I was younger, that would get me really depressed, then I would run into somebody and forget about it, just because I got into an another thing. People are wonderful that way; the presence of another human being can be so strong that it’ll change your whole outlook." Young wrote the song during his first transatlantic trip, while touring with CSNY. On the album 4 Way Street, Young jokes as he introduces the song: "Here is a new song. It's guaranteed to bring you right down. It's called 'Don't Let It Bring You Down'. It sort of starts off real slow and then it fizzles out all together."

"Birds" dates from at least 1968. Young attempted recording the song several times before the take featured on After the Gold Rush. One attempt, available on his Archives website, was recorded as a duet with new bandmate Graham Nash. Its lyrics concern a breakup, using bird imagery as metaphor.

"I Believe in You" is a somber ode to abandoned love. Young described the song in a June 1988 Spin interview:

Now that you made yourself love me, do you think I can change it in a day? That's a heavy one. That song has the most haunting lyrics. Am I lying to you when I say I believe in you? That's the difference between the song and the poem. The song makes you think of the hook, and the hook is I believe in you, but the rest of it is in a whole other place. That song I can hardly talk about. That one is too deep. I think I only sang it live two or three times, and only in the studio two or three times, so I may have only sung that song six times total.

== Recording ==
Young would once again employ David Briggs as producer for the sessions, as he did for his first two albums. Sessions took place over the course of a year, from August 1969 to June 1970 and were held at both professional recording studios and at a recently built studio in Young's Topanga Canyon home. During the recording of the album, Young toured with both Crazy Horse and Crosby, Stills and Nash, and made solo concert appearances. Sessions also overlapped with sessions for Déjà Vu, to which Young contributed the songs "Helpless" and "Country Girl".

Initial sessions were conducted with backing band Crazy Horse at Sunset Sound Studios in August 1969. The sessions followed the band's tour of North America in support of Everybody Knows This Is Nowhere from February to June of that year. Although progress was hampered by the deteriorating health of rhythm guitarist Danny Whitten, the sessions yielded two album tracks, "I Believe In You" and "Oh, Lonesome Me". Songs "Everybody's Alone", "Wonderin'" and an alternate take of "Birds" were also recorded but not used for the album. The sessions coincided with rehearsals for Crosby, Stills and Nash's tour in support of their debut album. Young was asked to join the group to facilitate performing the group's material in a live setting. Young would explain to author Nick Kent:

See, the way I used to work then, this would be the summer of 1969 we're talking about now, I'd usually go in and record with Crazy Horse at Sunset Sound Studios every morning. Then I'd go to CSN&Y rehearsal in the afternoon through to the evening. Then I'd go home, crash out, get up the next morning and do the same routine all over again. That's when "I Believe In You", "Oh, Lonesome Me", "Wonderin'", a couple of others on After the Gold Rush, all those songs were conceived there and recorded there. That's where I first cut "Helpless," by the way, and the only reason the Crazy Horse version didn't come out is because the engineer didn't record the perfect take, so, bam, that was lost.

After the sessions, Young embarked on a tour of the US with Crosby, Stills, Nash & Young that would include their now-famous appearance at Woodstock. The band would also make appearances at the Big Sur Folk Festival and on American television. In October, Young would again resume sessions with Crazy Horse at Sunset Sound and Larrabee Sound Studios, recording Whitten's "Look at All the Things" and Young's "Dance, Dance, Dance" and "Winterlong," each of which would go unused. In November, Young booked time with CSNY at Wally Heider Studios to record Déjà Vu before resuming their tour of North America followed by January appearances in Europe. In February and March, Young toured North America with Crazy Horse, performing the shows that would later see release on Live at the Fillmore East. Young's split attention between Crazy Horse and CSNY would result in some resentment from the latter band:

Crazy Horse was hard for anybody to understand when I was in CSNY. CSN couldn't understand. "What the fuck do you need Crazy Horse for?" There was very little understanding of what the hell was I doing with these people. Why would I waste my time? CSN were fulfilled with what they were doing, and I guess they couldn't understand why I wasn't. But I had already had this other thing going before and I wasn't gonna give it up. I had to keep going. I liked it. Everybody Knows was good, because even though CSN thought it was no good—it wasn't, like, theirs, it wasn't CSN—in the long run, it hung in there. It stayed on the charts. It was like, you know, a constant reminder to them. All the different ways that I could express myself with all these different groups of people. I had twice as many possibilities as the other guys.

The bulk of the album was recorded in mid-March 1970 in Young's home studio in Topanga Canyon, dubbed "Redwood Studios". Young recalls building the studio in the liner notes to Decade: "I put the wood on the walls myself and loved that feeling. My house was on a steep hill overlooking the canyon. The French horn player ran out of breath on my steep driveway." Musicians for these sessions generally feature CSNY bassist Greg Reeves, Crazy Horse drummer Ralph Molina and burgeoning eighteen-year-old musical prodigy Nils Lofgren of the Washington, D.C.–based band Grin on piano. The incorporation of Lofgren was a characteristically idiosyncratic decision by Young, as Lofgren had not played keyboards on a regular basis prior to the sessions. Along with Jack Nitzsche, Lofgren would join an augmented Crazy Horse sans Young before enjoying success with his own group as well as solo cult success and membership in Bruce Springsteen's E Street Band. Biographer Jimmy McDonough has asserted that Young was intentionally trying to combine Crazy Horse and CSNY on this release, with members of the former band appearing alongside Stephen Stills and Reeves. The album features several song where Young performs on piano as the primary instrument; "Oh, Lonesome Me" also features his first use of harmonica on record.

The April session for "When You Dance, I Can Really Love" at Young's Topanga home studio marks the last time Crazy Horse played together with Danny Whitten. Jack Nitzsche plays wild piano on the song, while Billy Talbot plays bass and Ralph Molina plays drums. Young described "When You Dance" as a "funky record".

The final session for the album produced the song "Birds." "Birds" was recorded on June 30, 1970, at Sound City Studios during a break in CSNY's summer tour. Young had made several previous attempts to record the song. The first attempt was in August 1968 with Jim Messina on bass and George Grantham on drums for Young's debut album. During the August 1969 Sunset Sound sessions, Young recorded a version featuring vibes with Crazy Horse that was erroneously released as the b-side to "Only Love Can Break Your Heart." The version lacks the second verse. Young explains in the biography Shakey: "The electric version of "Birds" with vibes turned out to be great, but it was only half the song. After the first verse I stopped. Forgot the second verse." Later that month during a break in CSNY's first tour, Young recorded a duet version on acoustic guitar with Graham Nash on vocals. The final take used on the album features Young on solo piano accompanied by members of Crazy Horse on vocals.

== Album cover ==
The album cover was designed by art director Gary Burden, who would go on to work with Young on his album covers until his death in 2018. Young describes the relationship in his memoir, Waging Heavy Peace:

I first met Gary Burden while shooting the CSNY cover for Déjà Vu, my initial album with CSN. Gary and I became good friends and we immediately worked together on the album cover for After the Gold Rush. I loved what he did with the photographs. Gary and I have been working together since that time, and I have done the great majority of my album art, my ads, and my songbooks with him. He is one of my closest compadres. Gary and his wife, Jenice, still work with me on every album cover. We are doing our life's work together.

The cover art is a pseudo-solarized image of Young passing an old woman at the New York University School of Law campus in the Greenwich Village district of New York City. The picture was taken by photographer Joel Bernstein and was reportedly out of focus. It was because of this he decided to mask the blurred face by solarizing the image. The photo is cropped; the original image included Young's friend and CSNY bandmate Graham Nash.

The back cover features a picture of the back of a pair of Young's jeans with several patches. His wife at the time, Susan Acevedo, would patch his jeans using her own hair as thread. Young explains in Waging Heavy Peace:

Susan, my first wife, made all those cool patches I wore back in the day when even I was fashionable. The pants on the back cover of After the Gold Rush were Susan's work. She was very artistic and put so much of her love into it. She even made me a beautiful patchwork vest with a blue velvet back. She sewed the patches on with some strands of her own hair. After we broke up, I wanted to keep it carefully tucked away forever. It was beautiful. I wanted to always remember her by it.

== Release ==
After the Gold Rush was originally released on vinyl by Reprise in September 1970. It was subsequently reissued on CD in 1986.

After the Gold Rush is one of four high-profile albums (all charting within the top fifteen) released by each of the members of folk rock collective Crosby, Stills, Nash & Young in the wake of their chart-topping 1970 album Déjà Vu, along with Stephen Stills (Stephen Stills, November 1970), If I Could Only Remember My Name (David Crosby, February 1971) and Songs for Beginners (Graham Nash, May 1971).

Lead single "Only Love Can Break Your Heart" entered the Billboard Hot 100 chart on October 24, 1970. An outtake version of "Birds" recorded at the initial Sunset Sound sessions has now been added to the album on the Neil Young Archives website, as have two versions of the song "Wonderin'". The Sunset Sound "Birds" was first released, accidentally, as the B-Side of the "Only Love Can Break Your Heart" single.

A remastered version was released on HDCD-encoded CD and digital download on July 14, 2009, as part of the Neil Young Archives Original Release Series. The remastered CD exists both as a standalone album and as Disc 3 of a 4-CD box set Official Release Series Discs 1-4, released in the US in 2009 and Europe in 2012.

To mark its 50th anniversary, a CD version of the album was re-released by Reprise on December 11, 2020, as After The Gold Rush 50th Anniversary Edition, the original cover having been enhanced with a 50 below its title. A limited edition vinyl box set came out on March 19, 2021. The re-release includes two different versions of the song "Wonderin'" – on the CD as two extra tracks and in the vinyl box set as a 45 rpm single in a picture sleeve. Side A, originally included on the Topanga 3 disc in The Archives Vol. 1: 1963-1972, was recorded in Topanga, California, in March 1970; Side B is a previously unreleased version recorded at Sunset Sound in Hollywood in August 1969.

Digital high-resolution files of the album are also available via the Neil Young Archives website, including a longer 3:36 outtake of "Birds" recorded at the same Sunset Sound sessions as "Wonderin'".

== Reception ==
Retrospective professional reviews
Review scores
| Source | Rating |
|---|---|
| AllMusic | 5/5 stars |
| Christgau's Record Guide | A+ |
| Encyclopedia of Popular Music | 5/5 stars |
| Pitchfork | 10/10 |
| The Rolling Stone Album Guide | 5/5 stars |

Critics were not immediately impressed; the 1970 review in Rolling Stone magazine by Langdon Winner was negative, with Winner feeling that, "none of the songs here rise above the uniformly dull surface." Village Voice critic Robert Christgau was more enthusiastic, saying: "While David Crosby yowls about assassinations, Young divulges darker agonies without even bothering to make them explicit. Here the gaunt pain of Everybody Knows This Is Nowhere fills out a little—the voice softer, the jangling guitar muted behind a piano. Young's melodies—every one of them—are impossible to dismiss. He can write 'poetic' lyrics without falling flat on his metaphor even when the subject is ecology or crumbling empire. And despite his acoustic tenor, he rocks plenty. A real rarity: pleasant and hard at the same time."

Critical reaction has improved with time; by 1975, Rolling Stone was referring to the album as a "masterpiece", and Gold Rush is now considered a classic album in Young's recording career.

=== Accolades ===
After the Gold Rush has appeared on several greatest albums lists. In 1997, The Guardian ranked it the 47th best album ever. In 1998 Q readers voted After the Gold Rush the 89th greatest album of all time. It was ranked 92nd in a 2005 survey held by British television's Channel 4 to determine the 100 greatest albums of all time. In 2003, Rolling Stone named the album the 71st greatest album of all time, 74th in a 2012 revised list, and 90th in the 2020 list. Pitchfork listed it 99th on their 2004 list of the "Top 100 Albums of the 1970s". In 2006, Time listed it as one of the "All-Time 100 Albums". It was ranked third in Bob Mersereau's 2007 book The Top 100 Canadian Albums. Its follow-up album, Harvest, was named the greatest Canadian album of all time in that book. In 2005, Chart readers placed it fifth on a poll of the best Canadian albums. In 2002, Blender named it the 86th greatest "American" album. New Musical Express named it the 56th greatest album of all time in 2013. The album was also included in the book 1001 Albums You Must Hear Before You Die. It was voted number 62 in Colin Larkin's All Time Top 1000 Albums 3rd edition (2000).

== Track listing ==
All tracks are written by Neil Young, except where noted. Track timings are from the original 1970 vinyl release, catalogue number RS 6383.

=== Side one ===
1. "Tell Me Why" (2:45)
  - Neil Young – guitar, vocal; Nils Lofgren – guitar, vocal; Ralph Molina – vocal
  - Recorded at Home Studio, Topanga, CA, 3/12/1970. Produced by David Briggs & Neil Young.
2. "After the Gold Rush" (3:45)
  - Neil Young – piano, vocal; Bill Peterson - flugelhorn
  - Recorded at Home Studio, Topanga, CA, 3/12/1970. Produced by David Briggs & Neil Young.
3. "Only Love Can Break Your Heart" (3:05)
  - Neil Young – guitar, vocal; Danny Whitten – vocal; Nils Lofgren – piano, vocal; Greg Reeves – bass; Ralph Molina – drums, vocal
  - Recorded at Home Studio, Topanga, CA, 3/15/1970. Produced by David Briggs & Neil Young.
4. "Southern Man" (5:41)
  - Neil Young – guitar, vocal; Nils Lofgren – piano, vocal; Greg Reeves – bass; Ralph Molina – drums, vocal; Danny Whitten – vocal
  - Recorded at Home Studio, Topanga, CA, 3/19/1970. Produced by David Briggs & Neil Young.
5. "Till the Morning Comes" (1:17)
  - Neil Young – piano, vocal; Danny Whitten – guitar, vocal; Greg Reeves – bass; Ralph Molina – drums, vocal; Stephen Stills – vocal; Bill Peterson – flugelhorn
  - Recorded at Home Studio, Topanga, CA, 3/19/1970. Produced by David Briggs & Neil Young.

=== Side two ===
1. "Oh, Lonesome Me" (Don Gibson) (3:47)
  - Neil Young – guitar, piano, harmonica, vocal; Danny Whitten – guitar, vocal; Billy Talbot – bass; Ralph Molina – drums, vocal
  - Recorded at Sunset Sound, Hollywood, 8/2/1969. Produced by David Briggs & Neil Young.
2. "Don't Let It Bring You Down" (2:56)
  - Neil Young – guitar, vocal; Nils Lofgren – piano; Greg Reeves – bass; Ralph Molina – drums
  - Recorded at Home Studio, Topanga, CA, 3/17/1970. Produced by David Briggs & Neil Young.
3. "Birds" (2:34)
  - Neil Young – piano, vocal; Danny Whitten – vocal; Ralph Molina – vocal
  - Recorded at Sound City, Hollywood, CA, 6/30/1970. Produced by David Briggs & Neil Young.
4. "When You Dance I Can Really Love" (3:44)
  - Neil Young – guitar, vocal; Danny Whitten – guitar, vocal; Jack Nitzsche – piano; Billy Talbot – bass; Ralph Molina – drums
  - Recorded at Home Studio, Topanga, CA, 4/6/1970. Produced by David Briggs & Neil Young.
5. "I Believe in You" (3:24)
  - Neil Young – guitar, piano, vibes, vocal; Danny Whitten – guitar, vocal; Billy Talbot – bass; Ralph Molina – drums, vocal
  - Recorded at Sunset Sound, Hollywood, 8/5/1969. Produced by David Briggs & Neil Young.
6. "Cripple Creek Ferry" (1:34)
  - Neil Young – piano, vocal; Danny Whitten – guitar, vocal; Greg Reeves – bass; Ralph Molina – drums, vocal
  - Recorded at Home Studio, Topanga, CA, 3/17/1970. Produced by David Briggs & Neil Young.
- "When You Dance, I Can Really Love" was incorrectly listed as "When You Dance You Can Really Love" on both the back cover and the disc label of the first CD issue by Reprise (catalogue number 2283-2). This was corrected in the 2009 Original Release Series remaster.

== Personnel ==
- Neil Young – guitar, piano, harmonica, vibes, lead vocals
- Danny Whitten – guitar, vocals
- Nils Lofgren – guitar, piano, vocals
- Jack Nitzsche – piano
- Billy Talbot – bass
- Greg Reeves – bass
- Ralph Molina – drums, vocals
- Stephen Stills – vocals (credited as Steve Stills)
- Bill Peterson – flugelhorn

Additional roles

- Gary Burden – art direction
- Joel Bernstein – photography
- Elliot Roberts – direction

== Charts ==
=== Weekly charts ===
Chart performance for After The Gold Rush
| Chart (1970–71) | Peak position |
|---|---|
| Australia (Kent Music Report) | 13 |
| US Billboard Top LPs & Tape | 8 |
| UK Album Charts | 7 |
| Canadian RPM 100 Albums | 5 |
| Spain Album Charts | 10 |
| Swedish Album Charts | 14 |
| Norwegian VG-lista Albums | 17 |
| Dutch MegaCharts Albums | 1 |
| Japanese Album Charts | 82 |
| US Cash Box Top 100 Albums | 7 |
| US Record World Album Chart | 4 |

=== Single ===
| Year | Single | Chart | Position |
|---|---|---|---|
| 1970 | "Only Love Can Break Your Heart" | US Billboard Pop Singles | 33 |
| 1970 | "Only Love Can Break Your Heart" | US Cash Box Pop Singles | 20 |
| 1970 | "Only Love Can Break Your Heart" | US Record World Pop Singles | 23 |
| 1971 | "When You Dance, I Can Really Love" | US Billboard Pop Singles | 93 |
| 1971 | "When You Dance, I Can Really Love" | US Cash Box Pop Singles | 93 |
| 1971 | "When You Dance, I Can Really Love" | US Record World Pop Singles | 59 |

Year End Charts

| Year | Chart | Position |
|---|---|---|
| 1970 | Cashbox Year End Chart | 82 |
| 1971 | Billboard Year End Chart | 20 |

== Certifications and sales ==
| Region | Certification | Certified units/sales |
|---|---|---|
| Netherlands | — | 40,000 |
| United Kingdom (BPI) | 2× Platinum | 600,000^{^} |
| United States (RIAA) | 2× Platinum | 2,000,000^{^} |
^{^} Shipments figures based on certification alone.
