= Chicago (Graham Nash song) =

Song of Graham Nash

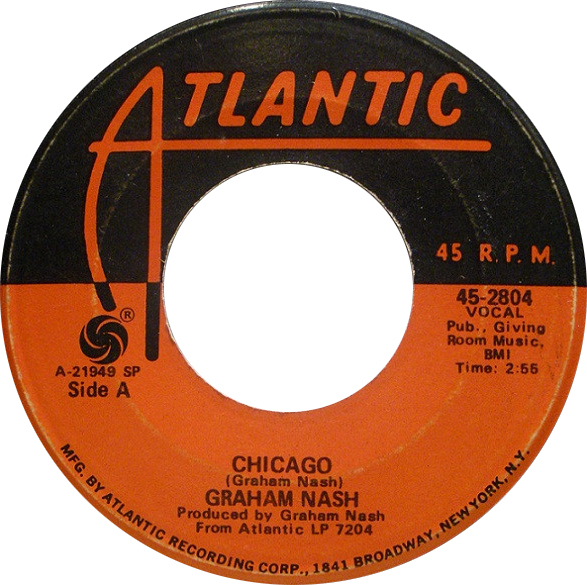
- Side A of the US single

Single by Graham Nash

from the album Songs for Beginners
- B-side: "Simple Man"
- Released: May 1971
- Genre: Rock
- Length: 2:55
- Label: Atlantic
- Songwriter: Graham Nash
- Producer: Graham Nash

Graham Nash singles chronology
"Chicago" (1971)	"Military Madness" (1971)

"Chicago" (often listed as "Chicago / We Can Change the World") is the debut solo single by English singer-songwriter Graham Nash, released in 1971 from his debut solo album Songs for Beginners. The song reached number 35 on the US Billboard Hot 100 chart and number 29 on the Cash Box Top 100. It is his highest-charting single. In Canada, "Chicago" peaked at number 19. The song also made the Dutch charts in 1971, peaking at number 5.

== Background ==
The title and lyrics of the song refer to the anti-Vietnam War protests that took place during the 1968 Democratic National Convention in Chicago and the subsequent trial of the Chicago Eight, where protest leaders were charged with conspiracy to incite a riot. The first line of the song, "So your brother's bound and gagged, and they've chained him to a chair", refers to Black Panther leader Bobby Seale, the sole African-American defendant, who was gagged and chained to a chair in the courtroom following repeated outbursts in protest of rulings by Judge Julius Hoffman.

The line "Won't you please come to Chicago just to sing?" refers to Nash pleading with bandmates Stephen Stills and Neil Young to come to Chicago to play a benefit concert for the Chicago 8 defense fund. The chorus contains the lines, "We can change the world / Rearrange the World".

On the Crosby, Stills, Nash & Young live album, 4 Way Street (1971), Nash dedicates the song to "Mayor Daley", a sardonic reference to Chicago mayor Richard J. Daley, who was notoriously antagonistic towards anti-war protesters. CSN and CSNY played the song live throughout their career.

In June 2008, in Denver, Colorado, CSN played a slightly rewritten version of the song called "Denver", in anticipation of the 2008 Democratic National Convention.

== Chart performance ==
=== Weekly charts ===
Chart (1971)	Peak position
Canada RPM Top Singles	19
France (IFOP)	16
Netherlands (Dutch Top 40)	5
Netherlands (Single Top 100)	6
US Billboard Hot 100	35
US Cashbox Top 100	29

=== Year-end charts ===
Chart (1971)	Rank
Netherlands (Single Top 100)	37

== Personnel ==
- Graham Nash – lead vocals, acoustic guitar, piano, organ, tambourine
- Chris Ethridge – bass
- Johnny Barbata – drums, tambourine
- Venetta Fields, Sherlie Matthews, Clydie King, Dorothy Morrison, Rita Coolidge – backing vocals

== Sherbet cover ==
In 1973, Australian band Sherbet recorded an extended version of Chicago for their album On with the Show, which went for over 10 minutes. Sherbet also performed a live version of the song on Australian TV show GTK.

== David Gilmour cover ==
In August 2009, Pink Floyd's David Gilmour released an online version, titled "Chicago - Change the World", on which he sang and played guitar, bass and keyboards, to promote awareness of the plight of Gary McKinnon. It featured Chrissie Hynde and Bob Geldof, plus McKinnon himself, and was made with Nash's support. A remix of the track later developed into the album Metallic Spheres, credited to The Orb and David Gilmour.

- Vocals: Gary McKinnon
- Producer: Chris Thomas
- Engineer, Keyboards, Producer, Programmer: Damon Iddins
- Engineer: Andy Jackson
- Additional Engineer: Julie Gardner
- Backing Vocals: Sophia Hutchinson
- Backing Vocals: Angela Moikeenah
- Additional Engineer: James Litherland
- Guitar, Vocals: James Litherland
- Drum Programmer: Wilson Sharp
- Commentary Vocals: Bob Geldof
- Commentary Vocals: Chrissie Hynde
- Bass, Guitar, Keyboards: David Gilmour
- Commentary Vocals: David Gilmour
- Writer: Graham Nash

== Hip hop samples ==
In 1999, the rappers Kanye West and Beanie Sigel sampled Chicago on the single "The Truth"; in 2003, Westside Connection used the same sample for their single "Gangsta Nation".

== Use at protest events ==
Graham Nash expressed displeasure toward Robert F. Kennedy, Jr. for the "unauthorized" use of the song at anti-vaccine rallies. Nash disagrees with Kennedy regarding vaccine hesitancy and felt that the original intent of his protest song was being co-opted for an unrelated cause that he did not believe in. Nash was concerned that people would mistakenly believe that he supports Kennedy's anti-vaccine campaign. Nash's manager suggested a "cease and desist" letter would be issued.
