= Songs for Beginners =

Studio album by Graham Nash
- Released: 28 May 1971
- Recorded: 1970–1971; Wally Heiders Studio III, Los Angeles and Studio "C", San Francisco
- Genres: Folk rock, country rock, rock
- Length: 32:13
- Label: Atlantic
- Producer: Graham Nash

Graham Nash chronology
Songs for Beginners (1971)	Wild Tales (1974)

Professional ratings
Review scores
Source	Rating
AllMusic	4.5/5 stars
AllMusic	(CD+DVD)
Rolling Stone	(favorable)

Songs for Beginners is the debut solo studio album by English singer-songwriter Graham Nash. Released in May 1971, it was one of four high-profile albums (all charting within the top fifteen) released by each member of Crosby, Stills, Nash & Young in the wake of their chart-topping Déjà Vu album of 1970, along with After the Gold Rush (Neil Young, September 1970), Stephen Stills (Stephen Stills, November 1970) and If I Could Only Remember My Name (David Crosby, February 1971). Songs for Beginners peaked at No. 15 on the Billboard Top Pop Albums chart, and the single "Chicago" made it to #35 on the Billboard Hot 100. A second single "Military Madness" was a hit in Australia, reaching #8 on its chart. The album has been certified a gold record by the RIAA.

== History ==
Nash brought in an impressive group of guests to assist in the recording, including David Crosby, Jerry Garcia, Phil Lesh, Dave Mason, David Lindley, Rita Coolidge, and Neil Young (under Young's early 1970s pseudonym Joe Yankee). The making of this album directly followed Nash's break-up with longtime girlfriend Joni Mitchell. Many of the songs are about their time together. The Top 40 track "Chicago" concerned both the 1968 Democratic National Convention and the trial of the Chicago Eight, articulating the outrage Nash felt concerning those proceedings.

"Wounded Bird" was written for Stephen Stills, about the pains he was going through in his relationship with Judy Collins. "Better Days" was also written for Stills, after Rita Coolidge left him for Nash.

A first-generation compact disc was released in the late 1980s, and reissued in 2011. A remixed version supervised by Nash was issued on 180-gram vinyl only by Classic Records in 2001. A deluxe edition of Songs for Beginners was released on 23 September 2008 as a CD+DVD-Audio pack, featuring a bonus multichannel high resolution audio, all new 2008 video interview with Nash, plus a photo gallery and complete lyrics along with the 11-track CD album remastered.

The song "Simple Man" features in the opening sequence of the 2007 film Reign Over Me, and a copy of the album appears in it. The same song was also used in the final minutes of the finale of the HBO series Looking. The song "Better Days" appears in episode 2 of Fox TV's The Passage, released in 2019. A demo version of "Be Yourself" plays during the closing credits of the film Up in the Air. "Military Madness" has been covered live by Death Cab For Cutie, and was covered by indie-rock band Woods on their 2009 album Songs of Shame. "I Used to be a King" was covered by Shawn Colvin on her 2015 album Uncovered.

In 2018, the song "Better Days" was used as the closing credit song in the Showtime miniseries Escape at Dannemora, Episode 7. In 2021, "Better Days" was played over the closing credits of the HBO Max series Hacks, Episode 6.

== Track listing ==
All tracks are written by Graham Nash, except "Be Yourself" written by Terry Reid & Graham Nash.

Side one
No.	Title	Length
1.	"Military Madness"	2:50
2.	"Better Days"	3:47
3.	"Wounded Bird"	2:09
4.	"I Used to Be a King"	4:45
5.	"Be Yourself"	3:03

Side two
No.	Title	Length
1.	"Simple Man"	2:18
2.	"Man in the Mirror"	2:47
3.	"There's Only One"	3:55
4.	"Sleep Song"	2:57
5.	"Chicago"	2:55
6.	"We Can Change the World"	1:00

== Personnel ==
- Graham Nash — vocals; acoustic guitar all tracks except "Simple Man"; piano on "Better Days", "Simple Man", "Chicago" and "We Can Change the World"; organ on "Better Days", "There's Only One", "Chicago" and "We Can Change the World"; paper and comb on "Sleep Song" tambourine on "Chicago"

Additional Personnel

- Dave Mason — electric guitar on "Military Madness"
- David Crosby — electric guitar on "I Used to Be a King"
- Jerry Garcia — pedal steel guitar on "I Used to Be a King" and "Man in the Mirror"
- Rita Coolidge — piano on "Be Yourself" and "There's Only One"; electric piano on "Be Yourself"; backing vocals on "Military Madness", "Better Days", "Simple Man", "There's Only One", "Chicago" and "We Can Change the World"
- Neil Young — piano on "Better Days", "I Used to Be a King" and "Man in the Mirror"
- Joel Bernstein — piano on "Military Madness"
- Chris Ethridge — bass guitar on "Man in the Mirror", "There's Only One", "Chicago" and "We Can Change the World"
- Calvin "Fuzzy" Samuel — bass guitar on "Military Madness", "Better Days" and "Be Yourself"
- Phil Lesh — bass guitar on "I Used to Be a King"
- John Barbata — drums all tracks except "Better Days", "Wounded Bird", "Simple Man" and "Sleep Song"; tambourine on "Chicago"
- Dallas Taylor — drums on "Better Days"
- Dorian Rudnytsky — cello on "Simple Man" and "Sleep Song"
- David Lindley — fiddle on "Simple Man"
- Bobby Keys — saxophone on "There's Only One"
- Simon Posthuma — bass clarinet on "Better Days"
- P.P. Arnold — backing vocals on "Military Madness"
- Venetta Fields — backing vocals on "There's Only One", "Chicago" and "We Can Change the World"
- Sherlie Matthews — backing vocals on "There's Only One", "Chicago" and "We Can Change the World"
- Clydie King — backing vocals on "There's Only One", "Chicago" and "We Can Change the World"
- Dorothy Morrison — backing vocals on "There's Only One", "Chicago" and "We Can Change the World"

=== Production personnel ===
- Graham Nash – producer
- Bill Halverson, Russ Gary, Larry Cox — recording engineers
- Glyn Johns – Mixing
- Doug Sax – mastering
- Gary Burden — art direction
- Joel Bernstein, Graham Nash – photography

== Charts ==
Chart (1971)	Peak position
US Billboard Top LPs	15
UK Album Charts	13
Canadian RPM 100 Albums	11
Dutch MegaCharts Albums	4
Australian Go-Set Top 20 Albums	11
Norwegian VG-Lista Album Charts	13
Swedish Kvällstoppen Chart	10
US Cash Box Top 100 Albums	10
US Record World Album Chart	11

Singles

Sales chart performance for singles from Songs For Beginners
Year	Single	Chart	Position
1971	"Chicago"	US Billboard Hot 100	35
1971	"Chicago"	Canada Top Singles (RPM)	19
1971	"Chicago"	Australia (Go Set Charts)	32
1971	"Chicago"	US Top Singles (Cash Box)	29
1971	"Chicago"	US Top Singles (Record World)	29
1971	"Chicago"	German (GFK Charts)	45
1971	"Chicago"	Belgium Charts	29
1971	"Military Madness"	US Billboard Hot 100	73
1971	"Military Madness"	Canada Top Singles (RPM)	57
1971	"Military Madness"	Australia (Go Set Charts)	20
1971	"Military Madness"	US Top Singles (Cash Box)	66
1971	"Military Madness"	US Top Singles (Record World)	73
1971	"I Used To Be A King"	US Billboard Hot 100	111
1971	"I Used To Be A King"	US Top Singles (Record World)	117

== Certification ==
Region	Certification	Certified units/sales
United States (RIAA)	Gold	500,000^{^}
^{^} Shipments figures based on certification alone.
