= Helpless (Crosby, Stills, Nash & Young song) =

1969 song by Neil Young

- Swedish single cover

Single by Crosby, Stills, Nash & Young

from the album Déjà Vu
- A-side: "Woodstock"
- Released: March 11, 1970
- Recorded: November 7, 1969
- Studio: Wally Heider
- Genre: Folk rock; country rock
- Length: 3:33
- Label: Atlantic
- Songwriter: Neil Young
- Producers: Crosby, Stills, Nash & Young

Crosby, Stills, Nash & Young singles chronology
"Suite: Judy Blue Eyes" (1969)	"Helpless" (1970)	"Teach Your Children" (1970)

"Helpless" is a song written by Canadian singer-songwriter Neil Young, recorded by Crosby, Stills, Nash & Young (CSNY) on their 1970 album Déjà Vu. Young played the song with The Band in the group's final concert with its original lineup, The Last Waltz, on American Thanksgiving Day 1976 at San Francisco's Winterland Ballroom, with Joni Mitchell providing backing vocals offstage.

== Composition and lyrics ==
In 1951, there was a polio epidemic in Canada and Neil Young contracted polio at the age of five. The left side of his body was permanently damaged, leaving him with a slight limp to this day. He later processed his memories of this time in the song Helpless.

The "northern Ontario town" mentioned in the first line of the song has often been assumed to be Young's Ontario hometown. Young said in a 1995 interview in Mojo magazine:

Well, it's literally not so much a specific city as a feeling. It's actually a couple of towns. Omemee, Ontario, is one of them. That's where I went to primary school and spent my "formative" years.

The song had already been recorded with Young's band Crazy Horse in early 1969. After Young joined the band CSNY in mid-1969, his new bandmates convinced him that the song would suit them better. Different versions of the song were recorded before they finally decided on the slow version. In this final version, Young sang the verses and his bandmates joined in on the chorus.

== Reception ==
Peter Doggett from Q magazine saw it as "one of the album's flagship tracks". Meanwhile, Bill Janovitz from AllMusic called the song a "stunning nostalgic lament" and "one of the best three-chord songs of all time".

== Personnel ==
=== CSNY ===
- Neil Young – lead vocals, acoustic guitar
- David Crosby – harmony vocals
- Stephen Stills – harmony vocals, electric guitar, piano
- Graham Nash – harmony vocals

=== Additional personnel ===
- Greg Reeves – bass guitar
- Dallas Taylor – drums
