= Cinnamon Girl =

Single by Neil Young and Crazy Horse

- Cover of German issue single

Single by Neil Young and Crazy Horse

from the album Everybody Knows This Is Nowhere
- B-side: "Sugar Mountain"
- Released: April 20, 1970
- Recorded: March 20, 1969
- Studio: Wally Heider Recording, Hollywood
- Genre: Rock; proto-grunge
- Length: 2:58
- Label: Reprise
- Songwriter: Neil Young
- Producers: Neil Young; David Briggs

Neil Young and Crazy Horse singles chronology
"Down by the River" (1969)	"Cinnamon Girl" (1970)	"Only Love Can Break Your Heart" (1970)

Official audio
- "Cinnamon Girl" (2009 Remaster) on YouTube

"Cinnamon Girl" is a song by Neil Young. It debuted on the 1969 album Everybody Knows This Is Nowhere, which was also Young's first album with backing band Crazy Horse.

== Songwriting ==
=== Music ===
Like two other songs from Everybody Knows This Is Nowhere, "Cowgirl in the Sand" and "Down by the River", Young wrote "Cinnamon Girl" while he was suffering from the flu with a high fever at his home in Topanga, California.

This song displays the very prominent role played by Danny Whitten in the sound of Young's early recordings. The vocals are a duet, with Whitten singing the high harmony against Young's low harmony. (The 45 rpm single mix of the song, in addition to being in mono and cutting off the guitar outro, features Whitten's vocal more prominently than the album version.) Young performed the song on his then-recently acquired Gibson Les Paul, "Old Black". The NME named "Cinnamon Girl" an example of "proto-grunge".

The song was written in double drop D tuning (DADGBD). This tuning is used in several of his most famous songs, such as "The Loner", "The Old Laughing Lady", "When You Dance I Can Really Love", "Ohio", and "Cortez the Killer". The music features a prominent descending bass guitar line. The song's "one note guitar solo", consisting largely of a repeating, sharply played jangling D note, has often been singled out for praise. According to Young "people say that it is a solo with only one note but, in my head, each one of those notes is different. The more you get into it, the more you can hear the differences.” The song is composed in Mixolydian mode.

=== Lyrics ===
The lyrics have the singer daydreaming for a girl to love, singing that he waits "between shows" for his lover. Young has said that he wrote the song "for a city girl on peeling pavement coming at me through Phil Ochs' eyes playing finger cymbals. It was hard to explain to my wife." The "city girl playing finger cymbals" is a reference to folk singer Jean Ray. Music critic Johnny Rogan described the lyrics as "exotic and allusive without really saying anything at all." Critic Toby Creswell describes the lyrics as "cryptic love lyrics" noting that they are sung "over the crunching power of Crazy Horse." Critic John Mendelsohn felt the song conveyed a message of "desperation begetting brutal vindictiveness," hinted at by the "almost impenetrably subjective words" but carried strongly by the sound of Crazy Horse's "heavy, sinister accompaniment."

Introducing the song at a performance associated with Writer's Week at Whittier College (California) in April 2015, Los Lobos co-founder Louie Pérez said that when he first heard "Cinnamon Girl", he was sure it was about a Mexican girl. Fans and news outlets have also speculated whether or not the song referred to Jim Morrison's common-law wife, Pamela Courson. Jim and Pamela were part of the Topanga community around this time, and Pamela had red-brown hair reminiscent of cinnamon. Young has denied, however, that the song refers to her.

== Chart performance ==
"Cinnamon Girl" was released as a single in 1970, where it reached No. 55 on the Billboard Hot 100. The song peaked at number 34 in Australia.

== Legacy and influence ==
British music publication NME ranked "Cinnamon Girl"'s opening chord progression at No. 47 on its "50 Greatest Guitar Riffs Of All Time".

In an interview with Q, singer Beck named the "Cinnamon Girl" riff as his all-time favourite, next to Black Sabbath's "Supernaut".

According to his autobiography, "Cinnamon Girl" was the first record played by the now-legendary British DJ "Whispering Bob" Harris on his BBC Radio 1 debut in August 1970.

== Personnel ==
- Neil Young – guitar, vocals
- Danny Whitten – guitar, vocals
- Billy Talbot – bass
- Ralph Molina – drums, vocals

== Well-known cover versions ==
The Gentrys recorded a version for a 1970 single release on Sun Records. This version went to number 52 on the US Hot 100.
