= Everybody Knows This Is Nowhere (song) =

Neil Young song

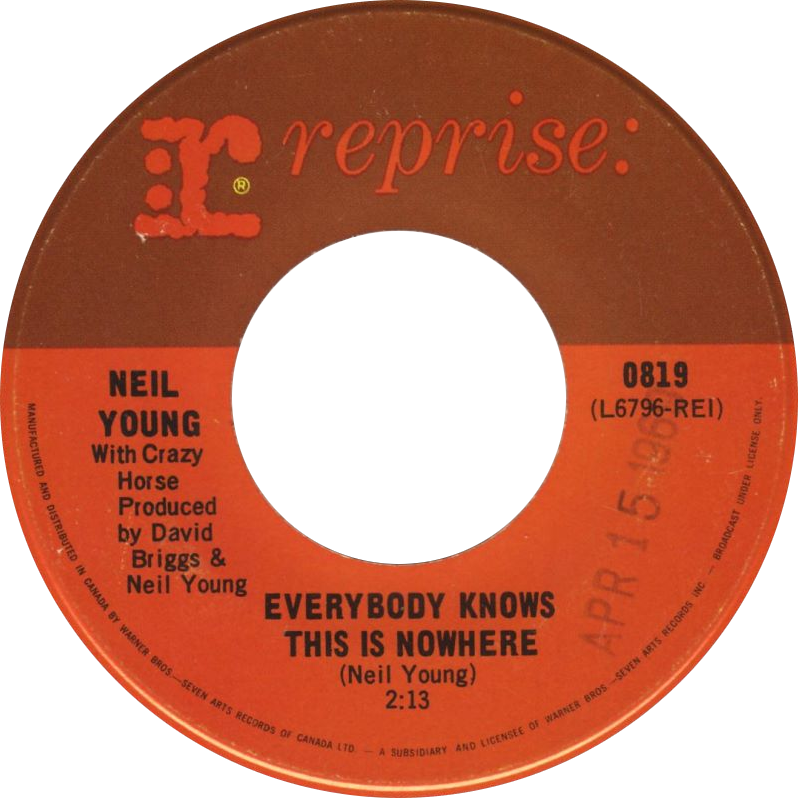
- Side A of the Canadian single

Single by Neil Young and Crazy Horse

from the album Everybody Knows This Is Nowhere
- B-side: "The Emperor of Wyoming"
- Released: May 14, 1969
- Recorded: January 23, 1969
- Studio: Wally Heider Recording Studio, Hollywood
- Genre: Country rock
- Length: 2:26
- Label: Reprise
- Songwriter: Neil Young
- Producers: Neil Young; David Briggs

"Everybody Knows This Is Nowhere" is a song written by Neil Young that was originally released as the title track of his 1969 album with Crazy Horse, Everybody Knows This Is Nowhere. The song was written earlier, and a different version was originally considered for Young's 1968 solo debut album Neil Young.

== Lyrics and music ==
The lyrics of "Everybody Knows This Is Nowhere" describe Young's disillusionment with the music scene in Los Angeles. Allmusic critic Matthew Greenwald describes it as "a cry from a man that is in need of settling down after a hair-raising experience." This is reflected in lyrics such as "I gotta get away from this day-to-day running around" and "I think I'd like to go back home and take it easy." Music lecturer Ken Bielen interprets the lyrics as suggesting that when the singer obtained what he originally wanted, possibly fame and success, he found them to be "nowhere."

The music of "Everybody Knows This Is Nowhere" has a country rock flavor. Young biographer David Downing describes it as "stripped–down foot–stomping rock. Pitchfork contributor Mark Richardson describes it as "a brash, rollicking country-rocker in the vein of the Band." Young biographer Jimmy McDonough hears an echo of Del Shannon's 1962 song "The Swiss Maid" in the music of "Everybody Knows This Is Nowhere."

Young and Crazy Horse guitarist Danny Whitten shared the vocals. The recording of the vocals eschewed using a mixing board, and these were recorded directly to tape. According to Young, this was done in an effort "to get all the bullshit out." Young liked the "edge" produced by the resulting impedance mismatch, which he thought produced a "spitty-sounding" vocal.

== Critical reception ==
Record World said that "Neil strokes that guitar for all he's worth." Music critic Johnny Rogan describes "Everybody Knows This Is Nowhere" as an "interesting, albeit slight composition," describing the harmonies as "both attractive and whimsical." According to Greenwald, the "Western-influenced melody" and Crazy Horse's playing reflect the theme of appreciating simple country life "perfectly." According to Uncut author Andy Gill, "the burly country twang of the astringent guitar riff, tempered by the poignant, sardonic tone of the 'sha-la-la' backing, combine to offer an intriguingly tart take on the new country-rock sound that was miles from the psychedelicized retro-purism of The Byrds and Burritos, and the saccharine sweetness of CS&N. McDonough regards this "compact, country-tinged" song as representing one of the archetypes of the Crazy Horse sound. The editors of Rolling Stone Magazine described it as "incisive guitar rock."

== Personnel ==
- Neil Young – guitar, vocals
- Danny Whitten – guitar, vocals
- Billy Talbot – bass
- Ralph Molina – drums, vocals

== Other versions ==
Young originally recorded "Everybody Knows This Is Nowhere" for his 1968 solo debut album Neil Young in a very different arrangement. Rather than Crazy Horses' rock arrangement, the version recorded for Neil Young was backed by woodwind instruments. Downing describes this version as sounding "pretty but passive" with "wistful vocal, beautifully layered guitars, strings and flute solo. McDonogh describes the Neil Young version as "jaunty, restrained, polite, complete with a rooty-toot-toot Moog solo. According to Downing, the rock version released on Everybody Knows This Is Nowhere loses none of the original versions's meaning. A version of the song without Crazy Horse was released as a promotional single in March 1969.

Dar Williams covered the song on her 2005 album My Better Self Allmusic critic Stewart Mason described this as a "nervy cover choice" that "come off well in the context of Williams' introspective originals [on the remainder of the album]. Dumptruck covered it on their 2001 album Lemmings Travel To The Sea. The Red Hot Chili Peppers covered the song with a live version on their 2012 EP Rock & Roll Hall of Fame Covers.
