= Tell Me Why (Neil Young song) =

Song by Neil Young

from the album After the Gold Rush
- Released: August 31, 1970
- Recorded: March 12, 1970
- Studio: Young's home studio in Topanga, California
- Genre: Acoustic rock; folk rock; roots rock
- Length: 2:54
- Label: Reprise
- Songwriter: Neil Young
- Producers: David Briggs; Neil Young

Official audio
- "Tell Me Why" on YouTube

"Tell Me Why" is the opening track on Neil Young's 1970 album After the Gold Rush. Written by Young, it was first introduced during the Crosby, Stills, Nash and Young shows of 1970 prior to the release of Déjà Vu. The song also appears on Live at Massey Hall 1971.

== Composition and lyrics ==
Musically, the song marks a shift from the hard rock of 1969's Everybody Knows This Is Nowhere and bears more folk and country influences, which would continue onto 1972's Harvest. The only instruments are two acoustic guitars, played by Young and Nils Lofgren. He is, however, backed by the vocal harmonies of Crazy Horse during the choruses. 'Tell Me Why' has a simple lyrical structure, with two verses each followed by a bridge then chorus, and one final bridge and chorus before a short instrumental outro. The chorus line "Tell me why, tell me why/Is it hard to make arrangements with yourself/When you're old enough to repay/but young enough to sell?" is the most famous line from the song, typifying the introspective and melancholic nature of not just this song, but the whole album.

The guitar is tuned down to D Standard (every string tuned a whole step down from standard tuning).

== Personnel ==
- Neil Young – guitar, vocals
- Nils Lofgren – guitar, vocals
- Ralph Molina – vocals
- Danny Whitten – vocals

== Cover versions ==
Norah Jones has covered 'Tell Me Why' and so has Radiohead, most notably at the White River Amphitheatre and the Hollywood Bowl in 2008. The song is a favorite of Red Hot Chili Peppers bassist Flea.
