= The Rockets (album) =

Studio album by The Rockets
- Released: 1968
- Genre: Blues rock, folk rock, psychedelic rock
- Length: 28:57
- Label: White Whale
- Producer: Barry Goldberg

Crazy Horse chronology
| The Rockets (1968) | Everybody Knows This Is Nowhere (1969) |

Professional ratings
Review scores
| Source | Rating |
|---|---|
| AllMusic | 3/5 stars |

The Rockets is the sole release by the Rockets in 1968. Selling only about 5,000 copies, it was far from a success. Nevertheless, the album found among its fans Canadian singer-songwriter Neil Young, who would soon take rhythm guitarist/lead vocalist Danny Whitten, bassist Billy Talbot and drummer Ralph Molina for his backing band on the album Everybody Knows This Is Nowhere. They first dubbed themselves War Babies, but Young renamed them Crazy Horse, a name that would stick. The Rockets soon folded due to Young's insistence on having Whitten, Talbot and Molina keep to a strict practice schedule (although the group was honored by the subtitle of one of Young's songs from Everybody Knows this is Nowhere: "Running Dry (Requiem for the Rockets)"). Talbot and Molina have remained as part of Crazy Horse to this day, and all of the other Rockets, except for Leon Whitsell, would eventually collaborate with Young.

"Hole in My Pocket" was released as a single. Whitten's "Let Me Go" was prominently covered by Three Dog Night on their 1968 debut. "Mr. Chips" was allegedly about Ahmet Ertegün's refusal to sign the band to Atlantic Records. The Rockets had been previously known as The Psyrcle on Lorna, a division of Autumn Records.

== Track listing ==
Side one
| No. | Title | Writer(s) | Length |
|---|---|---|---|
| 1. | "Hole In My Pocket" | Danny Whitten | 2:30 |
| 2. | "Won't You Say You'll Stay" | Whitten | 2:45 |
| 3. | "Mr. Chips" | Whitten | 2:22 |
| 4. | "It's A Mistake" | Ralph Molina, Billy Talbot | 1:53 |
| 5. | "Let Me Go" | Whitten | 3:47 |

Side two
| No. | Title | Writer(s) | Length |
|---|---|---|---|
| 6. | "Try My Patience" | Leon Whitsell | 2:17 |
| 7. | "I Won't Always Be Around" | L. Whitsell | 2:53 |
| 8. | "Pills Blues" | George Whitsell | 4:01 |
| 9. | "Stretch Your Skin" | L. Whitsell | 4:10 |
| 10. | "Eraser" | L. Whitsell | 1:57 |

== Personnel ==
- Danny Whitten – guitar, vocals
- George Whitsell – guitar, vocals
- Leon Whitsell – guitar
- Bobby Notkoff – violin
- Billy Talbot – bass
- Ralph Molina – drums, vocals
