= Rita Coolidge (album) =

Studio album by Rita Coolidge
- Released: February 1971
- Studio: Sunset Sound, Los Angeles
- Genre: Pop
- Length: 40:18
- Label: A&M
- Producer: David Anderle for Willow Productions

Rita Coolidge chronology
Rita Coolidge (1971)	Nice Feelin' (1971)

Professional ratings
Review scores
Source	Rating
Allmusic	4.5/5 stars
Christgau's Record Guide	C+

Rita Coolidge is the self-titled debut album by Rita Coolidge.

== Track listing ==
=== Side one ===
1. "That Man Is My Weakness" (Donna Weiss, Craig Doerge) – 3:50
2. "Second Story Window" (Marc Benno) – 3:00
3. "Crazy Love" (Van Morrison) – 3:35
4. "The Happy Song" (Otis Redding, Steve Cropper) – 3:50
5. "Seven Bridges Road" (Steve Young) – 5:55

=== Side two ===
1. "Born Under a Bad Sign" (Booker T. Jones, William Bell) – 4:10
2. "Ain't That Peculiar" (William Robinson, Pete Moore, Bobby Rogers, Marv Tarplin) – 4:02
3. "I Always Called Them Mountains" (Marc Benno) – 3:47
4. "Mud Island" (Donna Weiss, Mary Unobsky) – 4:28
5. "I Believe in You" (Neil Young) – 3:10

== Album notes ==
"That Man Is My Weakness"

- Leon Russell – piano, organ
- Spooner Oldham – electric piano
- Clarence White – guitar
- Marc Benno – guitar
- Chris Ethridge – bass guitar
- Jim Keltner – drums

"Second Story Window"

- Stephen Stills – acoustic guitar
- Booker T. Jones – bass guitar
- Jim Keltner – percussion

"Crazy Love"

- Booker T. Jones – piano, organ
- Stephen Stills – guitar
- Bobby Womack – guitar
- Donald Dunn – bass guitar
- Jim Keltner – drums
- Bobbye Hall Porter – tambourine

"The Happy Song"

- Booker T. Jones – organ
- Spooner Oldham – electric piano
- Clarence White – guitar
- Jerry McGee – guitar
- Chris Ethridge – bass guitar
- Jim Keltner – drums
- Bobbye Hall Porter – tambourine

"Seven Bridges Road"

- Booker T. Jones – piano
- Spooner Oldham – organ
- Clarence White – acoustic guitar
- Jerry McGee – Dobro, electric sitar
- Chris Ethridge – bass guitar
- Jim Keltner – drums
- Bobbye Hall Porter – bongos
- Plas Johnson – alto saxophone

"Born Under a Bad Sign"

- Booker T. Jones – electric piano
- Spooner Oldham – organ
- Clarence White – guitar
- Ry Cooder – bottleneck guitar
- Chris Ethridge – bass guitar
- Jim Keltner – drums
- Bobbye Hall Porter – congas
- Clifford Scott – tenor saxophone

"Ain't That Peculiar"

- Booker T. Jones – electric piano
- Clarence White – guitar
- Jerry McGee – guitar
- Chris Ethridge – bass guitar
- Jim Keltner – drums
- Bobbye Hall Porter – tambourine, congas

"(I Always Called Them) Mountains"

- Clarence White – guitar
- Jerry Mcgee – acoustic guitar
- Spooner Oldham – organ, piano
- Chris Ethridge – bass
- Jim Keltner – drums

"Mud Island"

- Booker T. Jones – organ, guitar
- Spooner Oldham – electric piano
- Clarence White – guitar
- Ry Cooder – bottleneck guitar
- Fuzzy Samuels – bass guitar
- Jim Keltner – drums, percussion
- Bobbye Hall Porter – tambourine, congas

"I Believe in You"

- Spooner Oldham – electric piano
- Clarence White – acoustic guitar
- Jerry McGee – acoustic guitar
- Booker T. Jones – bass guitar
- Jim Keltner – drums

Horns

- Jim Horn – baritone, alto & tenor saxophone
- John Kelson – tenor saxophone & bass clarinet
- Don Menza – tenor & alto saxophone & bass clarinet
- Clifford Scott – tenor saxophone
- Peter Christlieb – tenor saxophone
- Plas Johnson – tenor & alto saxophone
- George Bohanon – trombone & baritone horn
- Lew McCreary – trombone
- Ernie Tack – trombone
- Jack Redmond – trombone
- Dick Hyde – trombone
- Oliver Mitchell – trumpet & Flugal horn
- Charles Findley – trumpet & Flugal horn
- Al Aarons – trumpet & Flugal horn
- Dalton Smith – trumpet & Flugal horn
- Vincent DeRosa – French horn
- Bill Hinshaw – French horn
- Arthur Maebe – French horn
- David Duke – French horn

Strings

- Jesse Ehrlich – cello
- Jerome Kessler – cello
- Leonard Malarsky – violin
- William Kurasch – violin
- Wilbert Nutycomb – violin
- James Getzoff – violin
- Harry Bluestone – violin
- Ralph Schaeffer – violin
- Gareth Nuttycombe – viola
- Samuel Boghossian – viola

Background vocals

- The Blackberries – Clydie King, Venetta Fields, Sherlie Matthews, Priscilla Coolidge, Donna Weiss, and Rita Coolidge with Graham Nash, Bob Segarini and Randy Bishop on "Crazy Love"
- Arranger: String and Horn Arrangements by Booker T. Jones with the exception of "Ain't That Peculiar", "Born Under a Bad Sign", and "That Man Is My Weakness" arranged by Jim Horn and his Dynamite Horn Section
- Engineer: Bruce Botnick
- Recorded at Sunset Sound Recorders
- Cover Photograph: Joel Bernstein
- Art Direction: Roland Young

== Charts ==
Chart (1971)	Position
US Billboard 200	105
