= Déjà Vu (Crosby, Stills, Nash & Young album) =

Studio album by Crosby, Stills, Nash & Young and Dallas Taylor & Greg Reeves
- Released: March 11, 1970
- Recorded: July 1969 – January 1970
- Studios: Wally Heider, San Francisco; Wally Heider, Hollywood
- Genre: Folk rock
- Length: 36:24
- Label: Atlantic
- Producers: Crosby, Stills, Nash & Young

Crosby, Stills, Nash & Young and Dallas Taylor & Greg Reeves chronology
Crosby, Stills & Nash (1969)	Déjà Vu (1970)	4 Way Street (1971)

Singles from Déjà Vu
- 1. "Woodstock" Released: March 1970; 2. "Teach Your Children" Released: May 1970; 3. "Our House" Released: September 1970; 4. "Carry On" Released: November 1970

Déjà Vu is the second studio album by American folk rock group Crosby, Stills & Nash, and their first as a quartet with Neil Young. Released on March 11, 1970, by Atlantic Records, it topped the Billboard 200 chart for one week and generated three US Top 40 singles: "Woodstock", "Teach Your Children", and "Our House". It was re-released in 1977 and an expanded edition was released in 2021 to mark its 50th anniversary.

In 2003, the album was ranked No. 148 on Rolling Stone magazine's list of the 500 greatest albums of all time, and later was ranked No. 220 on the 2020 edition of the list. Certified 7× platinum by RIAA, the album's sales currently sit at over 8 million copies. It remains the highest-selling album of each member's career to date.

== Recording ==
The album was recorded between July 1969 and January 1970 at Wally Heider's Studio C in San Francisco, and Wally Heider's Studio 3 in Hollywood. It was produced by all four members of the band. Stephen Stills estimates that the album took around 800 hours of studio time to record; this figure may be exaggerated, even though the individual tracks display meticulous attention to detail. The songs, except for "Woodstock," "Almost Cut my Hair," and "Helpless," were recorded as individual sessions by each member, with each contributing whatever was needed that could be agreed upon. Young appears on only half of the tracks, with Nash stating he "generally recorded his tracks alone in Los Angeles then brought them back to the recording studio to put our voices on, then took it away to mix it".

Young's "Helpless" was released on his Neil Young Archives Vol. 1 (1963-1972) in 2009 in a different mix with a harmonica introduction. His other contribution, "Country Girl", combined two Buffalo Springfield songs, "Down, Down, Down" and "Whiskey Boot Hill" (also released on his Archives), with a recently written title chorus.

Commenting on the album to Hit Parader in 1971, Stills stated "getting that second album out of us was like pulling teeth, there was song after song that didn't make it. The track 'Déjà Vu' must have meant 100 takes in the studio. But 'Carry On' happened in a grand total of eight hours from conception to finished master. So you never know."

During the sessions, Crosby repeatedly started crying over the recent death of his girlfriend Christine Hinton. He told Crawdaddy in 1974, "I was not at my best as a functioning person, ... completely unable to deal with it all."

Nash stated to Music Radar, "the mood was different from the first album, which was recorded while the band members were in relationships, and by the second Joni and I had split up, Stephen and Judy had split up, and Christine had just been killed. It was all dark."

During this time members were not getting along, as they would critique each other's contributions, causing friction, with Crosby stating to Rolling Stone, "I kept 'Almost Cut My Hair' in there over the protestations of Stephen, who didn't want me to leave it in 'cause he thought that it was a bad vocal."

Stills brought "Woodstock" into the band, having already worked out the arrangement for it while playing with Jimi Hendrix in September 1969; this was released on the 2018 Hendrix album Both Sides of the Sky. The final version had Stills singing a slightly rearranged version of Mitchell's lyrics. "Woodstock" was one of the few Déjà Vu tracks where Crosby, Stills, Nash, and Young all performed their parts in the same session. Later the original lead vocal by Stills was partly replaced with a later vocal also recorded by Stills, who recalled: "I replaced one and a half verses that were excruciatingly out of tune." Young disagreed, saying that "the track was magic. Then later on [Crosby, Stills & Nash] were in the studio nitpicking [with the result that] Stephen erased the vocal and put another one on that wasn't nearly as good." Stills also made Nash change "Teach Your Children" from an "I'm Henry VIII, I Am" style song to a hit record with a "country swing".

Drummer Dallas Taylor and bassist Greg Reeves play on the majority of tracks, and are credited on the cover with their names in slightly smaller typeface. Grateful Dead guitarist Jerry Garcia plays pedal steel guitar on "Teach Your Children", and former Lovin' Spoonful leader John Sebastian plays harmonica on the title track.

== Release ==
By January 1970, Atlantic Records had taken in $2 million in preorders; anticipation for the album was high. Déjà Vu was released on March 11, 1970, under Atlantic Records catalogue SD 7200. It was re-released in 1977 as SD-19188 and the cover was changed from black to brown in some foreign releases.

It was certified Gold in the US, 14 days after release on March 25, 1970, spending 88 weeks in the Billboard 200 charts.

Four singles were released from the album with all but the last, "Carry On", charting on the Billboard Hot 100. The song "Country Girl" by Young is a suite put together from three song fragments entitled "Whiskey Boot Hill", "Down Down Down", and "Country Girl (I Think You're Pretty)", and is so identified in the credits.

The album was issued on compact disc a second time on September 6, 1994, after being remastered from the original tapes at Ocean View Digital by Joe Gastwirt.

== Reception ==
Professional ratings
Aggregate scores
Source	Rating
Metacritic	95/100 (deluxe edition)
Review scores
Source	Rating
Allmusic	5/5 stars
Christgau's Record Guide	B−
Rolling Stone	(Mixed)
The Village Voice	B+
Encyclopedia of Popular Music	5/5 stars

Contemporary reception was mixed, with Robert Christgau saying that there were "five or seven memorable tunes" and that it was "Young's guitar—with help from Stills and hired hands Taylor and Reeves—that make the music work, not those blessed harmonies".

Langdon Winner wrote for Rolling Stone that, despite the addition of Young, the sound "is still too sweet, too soothing, too perfect, and too good to be true". He has high praise for "Carry On", "Teach Your Children" and "Helpless" on Side One. Side Two has "precision playing, glittering harmonies, a relaxed but forceful rhythm, and impeccable twelve-string guitars" but no first rate songs. The Village Voice called it "Tight. Uptight, even."

Nick Logan and Bob Woffinden, of ZigZag and The New Musical Express, were critical of Crosby's and Nash's contributions, while stating that all of the other songs were "easily outclassed by the immensely superior material of Young."

== Legacy ==
The popularity of the album contributed to the success of the four albums released by each of the members in the wake of Déjà vu – Neil Young's After the Gold Rush, Stephen Stills' self-titled solo debut, David Crosby's If I Could Only Remember My Name, and Graham Nash's Songs for Beginners. In 2003, the album was placed at number 148 on Rolling Stone magazine's list of the 500 greatest albums of all time, moving up to 147 in a 2012 revised listing, and then down to number 220 in a 2020 revised listing. The TV network VH1 named Déjà vu the 61st greatest album of all time. It was voted number 106 in Colin Larkin's All Time Top 1000 Albums 3rd Edition (2000).

Déjà Vu was selected by the Library of Congress for preservation in the National Recording Registry in 2023.

In 2012, Déjà Vu was inducted into the Grammy Hall of Fame.

=== 50th anniversary reissue ===
A 50th anniversary edition was released on May 14, 2021, presented in the form of a five-LP vinyl box set, or a four-CD/one-LP vinyl box set, both with a 12x12 hardback book. The set features 38 previously unissued songs in the form of previously unreleased session recordings, outtakes and demos. On March 17, 2021, an unreleased recording of "Birds" by Neil Young and Graham Nash, followed by outtakes and demos including Stills' "Ivory Tower", Nash's "Our House" and Crosby's "Deja Vu" were released to promote the 50th anniversary box set.

=== Déjà Vu alternates ===
The alternate takes disc was released as a single LP on July 17, 2021, for Record Store Day. It was limited to 20,000 copies worldwide and featured an alternate album cover.

== Track listing ==
Side one
No.	Title	Writer(s)	Lead vocals	Length
1.	"Carry On"	Stephen Stills	Stills	4:26
2.	"Teach Your Children"	Graham Nash	Nash	2:53
3.	"Almost Cut My Hair"	David Crosby	Crosby	4:31
4.	"Helpless"	Neil Young	Young	3:33
5.	"Woodstock"	Joni Mitchell	Stills	3:54

Side two
No.	Title	Writer(s)	Lead vocals	Length
1.	"Déjà Vu"	Crosby	Crosby	4:12
2.	"Our House"	Nash	Nash	2:59
3.	"4 + 20"	Stills	Stills	2:06
4.	"Country Girl" a. "Whiskey Boot Hill" b. "Down, Down, Down" c. "Country Girl (I Think You're Pretty)"	Young	Young with Crosby, Stills & Nash	5:11
5.	"Everybody I Love You"	Stills, Young	Stills with Crosby & Nash	2:21
Total length:				36:06

=== Déjà Vu 50th Anniversary ===
Demos
No.	Title	Writer(s)	Length
1.	"Our House"	Nash	2:52
2.	"4 + 20"	Stills	2:27
3.	"Song With No Words (Tree With No Leaves)"	Crosby, Nash	3:14
4.	"Birds"	Young	3:38
5.	"So Begins the Task / Hold On Tight"	Stills	7:51
6.	"Right Between the Eyes"	Nash	2:07
7.	"Almost Cut My Hair"	Crosby	5:26
8.	"Teach Your Children"	Nash	3:14
9.	"How Have You Been"	John Sebastian	3:59
10.	"Triad"	Crosby	5:26
11.	"Horses Through a Rainstorm"	Terry Reid	3:36
12.	"Know You Got to Run"	Stills	4:09
13.	"Question Why"	Nash	2:21
14.	"Laughing"	Crosby	4:29
15.	"She Can't Handle It"	Stills	6:41
16.	"Sleep Song"	Nash	3:02
17.	"Déjà Vu"	Crosby	4:25
18.	"Our House"	Nash	2:46

Outtakes
No.	Title	Writer(s)	Length
1.	"Everyday We Live"	Stills	3:17
2.	"The Lee Shore"	Crosby	6:03
3.	"I'll Be There"	Stills	3:41
4.	"Bluebird Revisted"	Stills	3:24
5.	"Horses Through a Rainstorm"	Reid	3:32
6.	"30 Dollar Fine"	Stills	2:47
7.	"Ivory Tower"	Stills	3:51
8.	"Same Old Song"	Stills	4:20
9.	"Hold On Tight / Change Partners"	Stills	5:04
10.	"Laughing"	Crosby	4:09
11.	"Right On Rock 'n' Roll"	Stills	2:57

Alternates
No.	Title	Writer(s)	Length
1.	"Carry On (Early Alternate Mix)"	Stills	4:31
2.	"Teach Your Children (Early Version)"	Nash	3:00
3.	"Almost Cut My Hair (Early Version)"	Crosby	10:13
4.	"Helpless (with harmonica)"	Young	3:47
5.	"Woodstock (Alternate)"	Mitchell	5:00
6.	"Déjà Vu (Early Alternate Mix)"	Crosby	3:41
7.	"Our House (Early Version)"	Nash	2:57
8.	"4 + 20 (Alternate)"	Stills	2:15
9.	"Know You Got to Run"	Stills	6:47

== Personnel ==
- David Crosby – vocals all tracks except "4+20"; rhythm guitar on "Almost Cut My Hair," "Woodstock," "Déjà Vu" "Country Girl" and "Everybody I Love You"
- Stephen Stills – vocals all tracks except "Almost Cut My Hair"; guitars all tracks except "Our House"; bass on "Carry On", "Teach Your Children" and "Déjà Vu"; keyboards on "Déjà Vu" and "Everybody I Love You"; organ on "Carry On" and "Woodstock"; piano on "Helpless" and "Country Girl"; percussion on "Carry On"
- Graham Nash – vocals all tracks except "Almost Cut My Hair" and "4+20"; piano on "Woodstock" and "Our House"; harpsichord on "Our House"; organ on "Almost Cut My Hair"; rhythm guitar on "Teach Your Children" and "Country Girl"; percussion on "Carry On" and "Country Girl"; tambourine on "Teach Your Children"
- Neil Young – vocals on "Helpless" and "Country Girl"; guitars on "Almost Cut My Hair", "Helpless", "Woodstock" and "Country Girl"; pipe organ, harmonica and vibraphone on "Country Girl"; organ on "Everybody I Love You"

Additional musicians

- Greg Reeves – bass on "Almost Cut My Hair", "Helpless", "Woodstock", "Our House", "Country Girl" and "Everybody I Love You"
- Dallas Taylor – drums all tracks except "Teach Your Children" and "4+20"; tambourine on "Teach Your Children"
- Jerry Garcia – pedal steel guitar on "Teach Your Children"
- John Sebastian – harmonica on "Déjà Vu"

Production

- Crosby, Stills, Nash & Young – producers
- Bill Halverson – engineer
- Gary Burden – art direction and design
- Henry Diltz, Tom Gundelfinger – photography
- Elliot Roberts – direction
- David Geffen – agent
- Joe Gastwirt – digital remastering

== Charts ==
Weekly charts

Chart (1970)	Peak position
Australian Albums (Go-Set)	1
Canada Top Albums/CDs (RPM)	1
Dutch Albums (Album Top 100)	1
Finnish Albums (Suomen virallinen lista)	17
French Albums (SNEP)	3
German Albums (Musikmarkt)	39
Italian Albums (Musica e dischi)	17
Japanese Albums (Oricon)	36
Norwegian Albums (VG-lista)	11
Spanish Albums (PROMUSICAE)	8
UK Albums (Official Charts)	5
US Billboard 200	1

Year-end charts

Chart (1970)	Position
French Albums Chart	12
US Billboard Year-End	11
US Cashbox Year-End	2
US Record World Year-End	7

Chart (1971)	Position
Dutch Album Charts	36
US Billboard Year-End	50

2021 Reissue

Chart (2021)	Peak position
Belgian Albums (Ultratop Flanders)	12
Belgian Albums (Ultratop Wallonia)	31
Dutch Albums (Album Top 100)	8
German Albums (Offizielle Top 100)	12
Hungarian Albums (MAHASZ)	35
Italian Albums (FIMI)	54
Japanese Albums (Oricon)	51
Portuguese Albums (AFP)	38
Scottish Albums (Official Charts)	12
Spanish Albums (PROMUSICAE)	68
Swiss Albums (Schweizer Hitparade)	32
UK Albums (Official Charts)	77
US Americana/Folk Albums (Billboard)	4
US Billboard 200	150
US Top Rock Albums (Billboard)	28

== Certifications ==
Region	Certification	Certified units/sales
Italy (FIMI)	Gold	25,000^{‡}
France (SNEP)	Platinum	300,000^{*}
Germany (BVMI)	Gold	250,000^{^}
Switzerland (IFPI Switzerland)	Gold	25,000^{^}
United Kingdom (BPI)	Gold	100,000^{*}
United States (RIAA)	7× Platinum	7,000,000^{^}
^{*} Sales figures based on certification alone.^{^} Shipments figures based on certification alone.^{‡} Sales+streaming figures based on certification alone.
