= Down by the River (Neil Young song) =

Single by Neil Young and Crazy Horse

from the album Everybody Knows This Is Nowhere
- B-side: "The Losing End" (US); "Cinnamon Girl" (Alternate version) (UK)
- Released: May 14, 1969
- Recorded: January 17, 1969
- Studio: Wally Heider Recording Studios, Hollywood
- Genre: Acid rock; proto-grunge
- Length: 9:13 (Album version); 3:35 (Single version)
- Label: Reprise
- Songwriter: Neil Young
- Producers: Neil Young; David Briggs

Neil Young and Crazy Horse singles chronology
"The Loner" (1969)	"Down by the River" (1969)	"Cinnamon Girl" (1970)

"Down by the River" is a song composed by Neil Young. It was first released on his 1969 album with Crazy Horse, Everybody Knows This Is Nowhere. Young explained the context of the story in the liner notes of his 1977 anthology album Decade, stating that he wrote "Down by the River", "Cinnamon Girl" and "Cowgirl in the Sand" while delirious in bed in Topanga Canyon with a 103 °F (39 °C) fever.

== Lyrics and music ==
The lyrics tell the story of someone who killed his lover by shooting her after feeling unable to continue from the emotional highs of their relationship. Young himself has provided multiple explanations for the lyrics. In an interview with Robert Greenfield in 1970, a year after the song was released, Young claimed that "there's no real murder in it. It's about blowing your thing with a chick. It's a plea, a desperate cry." Later, when introducing the song in New Orleans on September 27, 1984, Young said that the song depicts a man "who had a lot of trouble controlling himself" who catches his woman cheating on him, then meets her down by the river and shoots her. According to Young, the local sheriff comes to the man's house and arrests him a few hours later.

"Down by the River" begins with electric guitars followed by bass guitar and snare drum before the vocals begin. The vocal sections are taken at a slow tempo. There are long instrumental passages after each of the first two refrains, during which Young plays short, staccato notes on his guitar and incorporates distortion. The song is composed in the key of E minor. The verse follows a chord progression of Em7-A while the pre-chorus is Cmajor7-Bm-Cmajor7-Bm-C-Bm-D and the chorus is G-D-D-A.

Upon the single release, Record World said that Young "sparkles in this solo outing which has some 'Hey Joe' influence in it." Cash Box called it an "excellent sample of [Young's] soloist strength." Rolling Stone critic Rob Sheffield called "Down by the River" and "Cowgirl in the Sand" the "key tracks" on Everybody Knows This is Nowhere, calling them "long, violent guitar jams, rambling over the nine-minute mark with no trace of virtuosity at all, just staccato guitar blasts sounding as though Young is parachuting down into the middle of the Hatfield-McCoy feud." In one solo, the same staccato note is repeated 38 times. In 2015, Phish guitarist Trey Anastasio wrote, "If I was ever going to teach a master class to young guitarists, the first thing I would play them is the first minute of Neil Young's original "Down by the River" solo. It's one note, but it's so melodic, and it just snarls with attitude and anger. It's like he desperately wants to connect." Brett Milano of uDiscoverMusic rated Young's guitar solo as one of the 100 all-time greatest, stating that "it begins with almost nothing – the pure menace of one note played again and again – and builds to a pile of hulking riffs.

== Personnel ==
- Neil Young – electric guitar, vocal
- Danny Whitten – electric guitar, backing vocal
- Billy Talbot – bass
- Ralph Molina – drums, backing vocal

== Performances and covers ==
Live performances vary from shorter solo acoustic performances, as on the Crosby Stills Nash & Young release 4 Way Street, to twelve minutes long, as on the Live at the Fillmore East release featuring Crazy Horse. At the Rock Am Ring in Germany in 2002, Young, backed by Booker T Jones, Donald "Duck" Dunn, and Frank Sampedro, played "Down by the River" for over 27 minutes. At Farm Aid 1998, Young joined Phish—who headlined that year's festival—during the band's jam out of "Runaway Jim", leading them into a 20-minute version of "Down by the River". Neil Young and Promise of the Real played a 20-minute version of this song at Desert Trip. In 2016, Neil Young and Promise of the Real played a 36+ minute version of the song to open their set at the Beale Street Music Festival in Memphis, Tennessee.

A CSNY performance of the song from September 1969 was included in the 1971 documentary Celebration at Big Sur.

Young performed it with CSNY on the ABC TV show The Music Scene in 1969.

Joey Gregorash covered this song in 1971 gaining a lot of airplay in Canada, and reaching #6 on the RPM Magazine charts.

Guitarist Roy Buchanan recorded a cover version of "Down by the River" on his 1971 album Buch and the Snakestretchers, and on his 1978 album You're Not Alone. The Meters, The String Cheese Incident, Dave Matthews Band, Inner Circle, Low/Dirty Three, Tall Firs, McKendree Spring, Michael McDonald, The Mother Hips, The Sheepdogs, Puss n Boots, Norman Whitfield & The Undisputed Truth, Buddy Miles and Griffin also cover this song. The song appears on the Dave Matthews & Tim Reynolds 2007 live release Live at Radio City. Robert Plant borrows the line, "Be on my side, I'll be on your side, there is no reason for you to hide," in the live versions of "Dazed and Confused" and "How Many More Times" recorded in 1970 at Royal Albert Hall (from the Led Zeppelin DVD).

An acoustic version by the Indigo Girls appeared on their 1995 live double CD 1200 Curfews; the song had been a staple of their early 1993 shows and featured a cello and violin solo by Jane Scarpantoni and Scarlet Rivera respectively.

Canadian musician Edwin borrows elements of the song in his 1999 song, "Trippin'".

Low and Dirty Three teamed up to cover "Down by the River" on In the Fishtank 7.

A cover by Johnny Maestro & the Brooklyn Bridge charted for two weeks on the Billboard Hot 100 from 7/11 to 7/18/1970, peaking at position 91.

A cover by Buddy Miles charted seven weeks on the Billboard Hot 100 from 7/18 to 8/29/1970, peaking at position 68.

American experimental artist Jude the Obscure covered the song for their 2019 album Plastic.

Indie rock band Car Seat Headrest, at the time a solo project of frontman Will Toledo, incorporated elements of "Down by the River" in their 2013 song, "The Gun Song," off of their eighth album Nervous Young Man. These elements are reversed on streaming in the “No Trigger Version,” due to not getting the rights to interpolate the lyrics

Actor Bradley Cooper performed a vivid air-guitar cover of the song on The Tonight Show in 2015.

Singer/musician Norah Jones was joined onstage by Neil Young for an acoustic version of "Down by the River" on Day 2 of the 2014 Bridge Benefit concert.

Norah Jones also performed a cover of "Down by the River" in her online brief concert of November 5, 2020, one of a series that she posted online during the COVID-19 pandemic.
