= Scott Dibble (singer-songwriter) =

Canadian singer-songwriter, recording artist and producer

Scott Dibble is a Canadian singer-songwriter, recording artist and producer, who has recorded and performed with the bands Watertown and Hemingway Corner.

== Early life and education ==
The son of high school teachers, he was raised in Toronto, Ontario, and began taking his bands to perform in local clubs during his teens.

== Career ==
He first attracted record label interest with The Watertown Trio, although by the time he signed to Warner Music Group in 1989 Dibble was the band's only core member and was otherwise supplemented by session musicians. His debut album as Watertown, No Singing at the Dinner Table, was released in 1990 and featured the singles "Paper Walls" and "If We Turn Out the Lights".

He was a tourmate of Barenaked Ladies on their first national tour, and cowrote the song "New Kid (On the Block)" from their debut album Gordon. BNL's Ed Robertson and Steven Page in turn guested on Dibble's second record One Phoebe Street, which also included contributions from Colin Linden, Jonathan Goldsmith, Gordie Johnson, Blair Packham and Bob Wiseman. Singles from the album included "I Run to You" and "That's What Love Is For". "I Run to You" peaked at No. 44 in the RPM100 pop chart in July 1992, and at No. 13 in the magazine's adult contemporary chart in September. It was ranked No. 86 in the magazine's year-end chart of the year's top adult contemporary songs.

After One Phoebe Street, Dibble was released from his contract with Warner Music Group. He and guitarist Mark Sterling then joined Hemingway Corner, following the departure of that band's founding member Johnny Douglas, and participated in recording that band's second album, Under the Big Sky. The band initially supported the album by touring as an opening act for Jann Arden in 1995, during which Dibble would return to the stage during Arden's set as the duet vocalist on her hit "Unloved". The album featured the singles "Big Sky", which reached No. 1 on Canada's adult contemporary charts and No. 18 on the pop charts, and "Watch Over You", which reached No. 7 at adult contemporary and No. 21 pop. "Watch Over You" received a SOCAN Award in 1997 as one of the ten most played Canadian songs on radio that year.

Through the late 1990s and 2000s Hemingway Corner went on hiatus, but Dibble continued to write, record and tour. He also began to shift some of his focus to producing and writing for other artists, opening his Hidden Sound Studio in 2007. In 2011, he co-produced, co-wrote, recorded and performed on Hemingway Corner's third release Speed of Life, and co-produced and recorded Jon Brooks' record Delicate Cages and Arlene Bishop's record 24 is 12 twice or 24 for short.

== Discography ==
- No Singing at the Dinner Table (1990)
- One Phoebe Street (1992)
