= Teach Your Children =

Single by Crosby, Stills, Nash & Young

from the album Déjà Vu
- B-side: "Carry On"
- Released: May 1970
- Recorded: October 24, 1969
- Genre: Country rock; folk rock
- Length: 2:53
- Label: Atlantic
- Songwriter: Graham Nash
- Producer: Crosby, Stills, Nash & Young

Crosby, Stills, Nash & Young singles chronology
"Woodstock" (1970)	"Teach Your Children" (1970)	"Ohio" (1970)

"Teach Your Children" is a song written by Graham Nash in 1968 when he was a member of the Hollies. Although it was never recorded by that group in a studio, the Hollies did record it live in 1983. After the song was initially recorded for the album Crosby, Stills & Nash in 1969, a much more enhanced version of the song was recorded for the album Déjà Vu by Crosby, Stills, Nash & Young, released in 1970. As a single, the song peaked at No. 16 on the Billboard Hot 100 charts that year. On the Easy Listening chart, it peaked at No. 28. In Canada, "Teach Your Children" reached No. 8. Reviewing the song, Cash Box commented on the "incredible soft harmony luster" and "delicately composed material." Billboard called it "a smooth country-flavored ballad that should prove an even bigger hit on the charts [than 'Woodstock']." Stephen Stills gave the song its "country swing", replacing the "Henry VIII" style of Nash's original demo.

Nash, who is also an accomplished photographer and collector of photographs, associated the song's message with a famous 1962 photo by Diane Arbus, Child with Toy Hand Grenade in Central Park, shortly after writing the song. The image, which depicts a child with an angry expression holding the toy weapon, prompted Nash to reflect on the societal implications of messages given to children about war and other issues.

The recording features Jerry Garcia on pedal steel guitar. Garcia taught himself how to play the instrument during his tenure with the New Riders of the Purple Sage. He told Lon Goddard of the British music newspaper Record Mirror in an interview that he recorded a series of pieces on the steel guitar and spliced them together in the studio to create the backing and solo. Garcia had made a deal that in return for his playing steel guitar on "Teach Your Children," CSNY would help members of the Grateful Dead improve their vocal harmony for their upcoming albums, Workingman's Dead and American Beauty. In June 2026, CBS News included the song in its list of the 250 essential American songs of the past 250 years.

== Personnel ==
=== CSN ===
- Graham Nash – lead vocals, harmony vocals, acoustic rhythm guitar, percussion
- David Crosby – harmony vocals
- Stephen Stills – harmony vocals, acoustic rhythm guitar, bass guitar

=== Additional Personnel ===
- Jerry Garcia – pedal steel guitar
- Dallas Taylor – drums, tambourine, percussion

== Chart history ==
=== Weekly charts (1970) ===
Chart (1970)	Peak position
Australia KMR	11
Canada RPM Top Singles	8
Netherlands (Single Top 100)	7
New Zealand (Listener)	19
U.S. Billboard Hot 100	16
U.S. Billboard Adult Contemporary	28
U.S. Cash Box Top 100	16
U.S. Record World Top 100	16

=== Year-end charts (1970) ===
Chart (1970)	Rank
Australia	81
Canada	95
Netherlands	68
U.S. (Joel Whitburn's Pop Annual)	129

=== "The Red Hots" (1994) ===
In 1994, Crosby, Stills & Nash re-recorded the song with guest vocals from country music artists Suzy Bogguss, Alison Krauss and Kathy Mattea, crediting the recording to "The Red Hots". This version was included on the album Red Hot + Country, a release by the Red Hot Organization benefiting AIDS awareness. The Red Hots' version of the song spent one week on the Hot Country Songs chart in October 1994, at No. 75.

== Certifications ==
Region	Certification	Certified units/sales
New Zealand (RMNZ)	Gold	15,000^{‡}
^{‡} Sales+streaming figures based on certification alone.

== In popular culture ==
- In 1971, "Teach Your Children" was the final song in the movie Melody.
- In 1979, the song was featured in the WKRP in Cincinnati episode "I Want to Keep My Baby".
- In 1984, Democratic candidate Walter Mondale used the song in a presidential campaign commercial on arms control.
- In 1985, the song was used with modified lyrics in a TV commercial promoting schools' use of the Apple II family of personal computers.
- In 1991, the song was featured in The Wonder Years episode "Road Trip".
- In the 1993 The Simpsons episode "Marge in Chains", David Crosby makes a cameo as Lionel Hutz's 12-step sponsor, who tells him "Just take it one day at a time, and know that I love you.", paraphrasing the song's lyrics.
- In 2004, the song was featured in the Six Feet Under episode "Falling Into Place".
- In 2006, it was sung by Steve Carell and Rainn Wilson on The Office episode "Take Your Daughter to Work Day".
- In 2015, the song was covered by Matthew Morrison during the series finale episode of Glee, "Dreams Come True".
- In 2018, the song was used frequently in The X-Files episode "Rm9sbG93ZXJz".
- In 2023, the song was covered by MonaLisa Twins on their album The Duo Sessions II.
- In 2025, Nash performed the song alongside Dawes and Stephen Stills at Kia Forum in Inglewood, California for FireAid to help with relief efforts for the January 2025 Southern California wildfires.
