= Everybody Knows This Is Nowhere =

Studio album by Neil Young with Crazy Horse
- Released: May 14, 1969
- Recorded: January and March 1969
- Studios: Wally Heider and Sunwest (Hollywood)
- Genres: Country rock; folk rock; garage rock; hard rock; acid rock
- Length: 40:02
- Label: Reprise
- Producers: Neil Young; David Briggs

Neil Young chronology
Neil Young (1968)	Everybody Knows This Is Nowhere (1969)	After the Gold Rush (1970)

Crazy Horse chronology
The Rockets (as the Rockets) (1968)	Everybody Knows This Is Nowhere (1969)	Crazy Horse (1971)

Singles from Everybody Knows This Is Nowhere
- 1. "Everybody Knows This Is Nowhere" / "The Emperor of Wyoming" Released: April 7, 1969; 2. "Down by the River" / "The Losing End (When You're On)" Released: May 14, 1969; 3. "Cinnamon Girl" / "Sugar Mountain" Released: April 20, 1970

Everybody Knows This Is Nowhere is the second studio album by the Canadian-American musician Neil Young, released in May 1969 on Reprise Records. His first album with longtime backing band Crazy Horse, it emerged as a sleeper hit amid Young's contemporaneous success with Crosby, Stills, Nash & Young, peaking at number 34 on the US Billboard 200 in August 1970 during a 98-week chart stay. It has been certified platinum by the RIAA.

In 2003, the album was ranked number 208 on Rolling Stone's 500 Greatest Albums of All Time and at number 407 in the 2020 edition. Additionally, it was voted number 124 in the third edition of Colin Larkin's All Time Top 1000 Albums (2000).

== Background ==
Everybody Knows This Is Nowhere was Neil Young's first album with longtime collaborators Crazy Horse. Guitarist, songwriter and singer Danny Whitten, bassist Billy Talbot, and drummer Ralph Molina had already been performing and recording together as the Rockets. They met Young through the Laurel Canyon music scene and started playing together. In a February 2021 interview, Molina remembers how the group ended up collaborating with Young:

"Neil would come out to (Billy Talbot's) house in Laurel Canyon, after he left the Springfield, and play acoustic with us and talk. After we became the Rockets, we were going to play the Whisky in Hollywood. We asked him to come sit in with us, which he did. We then formed into Crazy Horse and recorded Everybody Knows This Is Nowhere. The sessions went free and easy, like they are to this day. No rehearsals. Neil walks in with a song, then we jump in. We get it in one, two takes. After that, the feel, heart and emotion are lost. Any more takes, and now you're just playing a part. When you're young, there are no politics, nothing to get in the way. We just had fun playing- no thinking, just playing."

Young recalls the atmosphere in an interview with J.C. Costa: "We got together, started rehearsing and we went right in. That whole album was like catching the group just as they were getting to know each other. We didn't even know what we sounded like until we heard the album." In an April 1970 interview with Rolling Stone, he stated that "we'd only been together for six or seven days when 'Down By The River' was cut."

Young credits the album's unique sound to the guitar playing of Whitten and the interplay between the two. He explains in the biography Shakey:

"That's what was so great about Crazy Horse in those days: Danny understood my music, and everyone listened to Danny. He understood what we were doing. A really great second guitar player, the perfect counterpoint to everything else that was happening. His style of playing was so adventuresome. So sympathetic. So unthoughtful. And just so natural. That’s really what made "Cowgirl in the Sand" and "Down by the River" happen: Danny’s guitar parts. Nobody played guitar with me like that; that rhythm. When you listen to "Cowgirl in the Sand," he keeps changing: plays something one and a half, maybe two, times, and he's on to the next thing. Billy and Ralph will get into a groove and everything will be goin' along and all of a sudden Danny'll start doin' somethin' else. He just led those guys from one groove to another, all within the same groove. So when I played these long guitar solos, it seemed like they weren't all that long, that I was making all these changes, when in reality what was changing was not one thing, but the whole band. Danny was the key."

== Songs ==
The album contains several songs that became standards in Young's performance repertoire. "Cinnamon Girl", "Down by the River", and "Cowgirl in the Sand" were written in a single day while Young had a 103 °F (39.5 °C) fever. Young explains in his memoir, Waging Heavy Peace:

"I had been sick with the flu, holed up in bed in the house. I was delirious half the time and had an odd metallic taste in my mouth. It was peculiar. At the height of this sickness, I felt pretty high in a strange way. I had a guitar in a case near the bed. I took it out and started playing; I had left it in a tuning I was fond of, D modal, with the E strings both tuned down to D. It provided a drone sound, sort of like a sitar, but not really. I played for a while and wrote "Cinnamon Girl." The lyrics were different from how the song eventually ended up, but all those changes happened right there, immediately, until the song was complete. Then I took the guitar out of D modal and kept playing. At the time, there was a song in E minor on the radio that I liked, "Sunny" or something like that. I remembered hearing it in the drugstore at Fairfax and Sunset while I was shopping for something to ease the flu. The song kept looping in my head, endlessly, like some things do when I’m sick and maybe a little delirious. So I started playing it on the guitar, and then I changed the chords a bit, and it turned into "Down by the River." I was still feeling sick, but happy and high. It was a unique feeling. I had two brand-new songs! Totally different from the last album! Then I started playing in A minor, one of my favorite keys. I had nothing to lose. I was on a roll. The music just flowed naturally that afternoon, and soon I had written "Cowgirl in the Sand." This was pretty unique, to write three songs in one sitting, and I am pretty sure that my semi-delirious state had a lot to do with that."

The song "Cinnamon Girl" is in D modal tuning, a tuning Young first used with Stephen Stills on "Bluebird". Young explained his relationship with the tuning with Nick Kent for Mojo magazine in December 1995: "Stills and I discovered this D modal tuning at around the same time in '66, I think... We'd play in that tuning together a lot. This was when 'ragas' were happening and D modal made it possible to have that 'droning' sound going on all the time, that's where it started...I've used that tuning throughout my career right up to today. You can hear it on everything from 'Fuckin' Up' on Ragged Glory to 'War of Man' and 'One of These Days' on Harvest Moon.”

In the Decade liner notes, Young states that he wrote "Cinnamon Girl" "for a city girl on peeling pavement coming at me thru Phil Ochs eyes playing finger cymbals. It was hard to explain to my wife." He further explained in an interview for the biography Shakey: "I remember this one girl, Jean 'Monte' Ray; she was the singing partner of Jim, Jim and Jean, a folk duo. Had a record out called 'People World', and she did a lot of dancing with finger cymbals. She was really great. Might’ve been her. Good chance. I kinda had a crush on her for a while. Moved nice. She was real musical, soulful. There’s images in there that have to do with Jean and there’s images that have to do with other people." In the 2005 liner notes to one of her own releases, Ray takes credit as the inspiration for both "Cinnamon Girl" and "Cowgirl in the Sand."

"Everybody Knows This Is Nowhere" had been attempted for Young's debut album. Its lyrics express dissatisfaction with the pace of showbusiness life.

"Round and Round" is the oldest song on the album. Young recorded the song as a solo acoustic demo while a member of Buffalo Springfield; the demo appears on the 2001 Buffalo Springfield box set.

"Down by the River" became one of Young's signature songs and one of his most frequently performed in concert. In a 1970 interview with Robert Greenfield, Young challenged the typical interpretation of the song as a murder ballad: "There's no real murder in it. It's about blowing your thing with a chick. See, now, in the beginning, it's 'I'll be on your side, you be on mine.' It could be anything. Then the chick thing comes in. Then at the end, it's a whole other thing. It's a plea; a desperation cry."

The lyrics to "The Losing End (When You're On)" are about the experience of finding out that your romantic partner has moved on.

"Running Dry (Requiem for the Rockets)" is dedicated to the Rockets, the six-piece band that evolved into Young's collaborators Crazy Horse. Rockets violinist Bobby Notkoff plays on the track. Young expressed his feelings about breaking up The Rockets in the 1997 film Year of the Horse: "I asked those three guys to play with me as Crazy Horse. And I thought the Rockets could go on, too. But the truth is, I probably did steal them away from the other band, which was a good band...That's the hardest part, is the guilt of the trail of destruction that I've left behind me."

"Cowgirl in the Sand" attempts to convey an emotion rather than relate a specific narrative. He explained in Shakey: "The words to 'Cowgirl in the Sand' are very important because you can free associate with them. Some words won't let you do that, so you're locked into the specific fuckin' thing the guy's singin' about. This way it could be anything. The thing is, as long as there's a thread that carries through it, then when you imagine what it's about, there's gonna be a thread that takes you to the end, too. You can follow your thought all the way through if you happen to have one, or if you don't, you realize it doesn't matter.

== Recording ==
Everybody Knows This Is nowhere represents a break from the recording methods of Young's work with Buffalo Springfield and his debut album, in which extensive overdubbing was used. Instead, the songs on the album were largely recorded live, without overdubs. Young explained to DJ B. Mitchell Reid: "That’s when a change came over me, right then. I started just tryin' to be real instead of fabricate something." For the first time, Young would record his vocal tracks live while playing.

In a 1970 interview with Rolling Stone's Elliot Blinder, Young stated:

"I'm trying to make records of the quality of the records that were made in the late Fifties and the Sixties, like Everly Brothers records and Roy Orbison records and things like that. They were all done with a sort of quality to them. They were done at once. It's just a quality about them, the singer is into the song and the musicians were playing with the singer and it was an entity, you know. It was something special that used to hit me all the time, that all these people were thinking the same thing, and they're all playing at the same time. It happens on a few cuts, you can hear it. I think "Cinnamon Girl," "Everybody Knows This Is Nowhere," and "Round And Round" has that feeling of togetherness, although it was just Danny and me and Robin Lane."

Young enlisted David Briggs to produce the record. Young had first collaborated with Briggs during the recording of his debut album. The first sessions for the album were held in late January 1969 at Wally Heider Studios in Hollywood, where the band recorded "Down by the River," "Cowgirl in the Sand" and "Everybody Knows This Is Nowhere."

"Down by the River" and "Cowgirl in the Sand" were edited down from extended performances, and in some cases combine multiple takes. Young explained in a 2009 interview for Guitar World: "You know, maybe what you hear on the record would be take one, but with a couple pieces of something else in there. I could look it up. We have all the track sheets." He continueed in Shakey: "'Down by the River' was really edited. We got the vibe, but it was just too long and sometimes it fell apart, so we just took the shitty parts out."

Young's lead vocal track on the song "Everybody Knows This Is Nowhere", intended as a temporary scratch vocal, was recorded through the talkback microphone on the mixing board at Wally Heider with no effects. Young liked this as a contrast to the rest of the recording.

The group took a break in recording from the end of January until late March. Young returned to Canada and performed a series of solo acoustic sets at Le Hibou Coffee House in Ottawa and the Riverboat Coffee House in Toronto. The Riverboat concerts would be released in 2009 as Live at the Riverboat 1969. Crazy Horse then joined Young for additional dates at in late February through March. Young would perform a solo acoustic set followed by a band set, performing at The Bitter End in New York; Cleveland, Providence, Rhode Island; and the Troubadour in Hollywood.

The band returned to Wally Heider on March 20 and recorded "Cinnamon Girl," "Losing End" and "Running Dry". "Cinnamon Girl" features handclaps inspired by the 1963 single "My Boyfriend's Back" by the Angels. An early single mix of the song features the vocals of Danny Whitten more prominently, with both him and Young equal in the mix; Young mixed his own vocals higher for the album version, a decision he came to regret. "Cinnamon Girl" is noted for its one-note guitar solo; according to Young, "in my head, each one of those notes is different. The more you get into it, the more you can hear the differences.”

On March 23, the band convened with singer Robin Lane at Sunwest Recording Studio in Hollywood to record "Round and Round". According to Young, "There were three people sitting like you and me, and then another, and six microphone booms coming down, absolutely stoned out of our minds in the studio, singing a song with the guitars, three guitars goin' at once...Doing it live and singing and playing all at once just makes it sound more real." Lane was surprised that her performance on the song became the master take: "I thought we were rehearsing. I didn’t even know what I was singing. Neil was the original punk rocker."

== Release ==
Everybody Knows This Is Nowhere was originally released on vinyl by Reprise Records on May 14, 1969. It was first released on CD in December 1987.

A remastered version was released on HDCD-encoded CD and digital download on July 14, 2009, as part of the Neil Young Archives Original Release Series. The remastered CD exists both as a standalone album and as Disc 2 of a 4-CD box set Official Release Series Discs 1–4, released in the US in 2009 and Europe in 2012.

Digital high-resolution files of the album are also available via the Neil Young Archives website.

The front cover is a grainy photo depicting Young leaning against a tree with his dog Winnipeg at his feet. The photographer was Frank Bez.

== Promotion ==
Young would tour with Crazy Horse upon completion of the album, playing various dates in North America in May and June 1969. From August to December, Young would join Crosby, Stills and Nash for their tour of North America promoting their debut album. The group would perform at Woodstock and the Big Sur Folk Festival and perform "Down by the River" on ABC Television. In February and March 1970, Young would once again tour with Crazy Horse, performing the bulk of the album in the setlist. Performances at the Fillmore East with Miles Davis opening would see release in 2006 as Live at the Fillmore East.

== Reception ==
Retrospective reviews
Review scores
Source	Rating
AllMusic	5/5 stars
Encyclopedia of Popular Music	5/5 stars
Music Story	4.5/5 stars
MusicHound Rock	5/5
Pitchfork	10/10
Rolling Stone	4/5 stars
The Rolling Stone Record Guide	5/5 stars
Spin Alternative Record Guide	6/10

Upon its release, Everybody Knows This Is Nowhere received generally favorable reviews from critics. Bruce Miroff of Rolling Stone wrote a favorable review, describing Young's voice as "perpetually mournful, without being maudlin or pathetic. It hints at a world in which sorrow underlies everything [...] because that world is recognizable to most of us, Young's singing is often strangely moving." Despite stating that "in several respects [the album] falls short of his previous effort," he concluded that "Young's music partially makes up for its lack of grace by its energy and its assurance." Robert Christgau wrote in The Village Voice that "Young is a strange artist and I am not all the way into him yet, but this record is haunting". The original review was printed with a grade of "B+", but Christgau later said he would have changed it to an "A−".

In a retrospective review in Rolling Stone, Greg Kot called the record "raw, rushed, energised", and the band's interplay "at once primitive and abstract", a "gloriously spontaneous sound" that "would endure, not only as a blueprint for Young...but as an influence on countless bands." William Ruhlmann of AllMusic said of the album, "released only four months after his first [album], [it] was nearly a total rejection of that polished effort." He noted that "Cinnamon Girl," "Down by the River," and "Cowgirl in the Sand" were "useful as frames on which to hang the extended improvisations Young played with Crazy Horse and to reflect the ominous tone of his singing". He concluded that the album "set a musical pattern Young and his many musical descendants have followed ever since [...] and a lot of contemporary bands were playing music clearly influenced by it".

Mark Richardson of Pitchfork wrote that "the opening riff to 'Cinnamon Girl' erases the memory of Neil Young completely in about five seconds" and that "Crazy Horse were loose and sloppy, privileging groove and feeling above all". He concludes that the album "was a sort of big bang for Young, a dense moment of creative explosion that saw possibilities expanding in every direction".

In 2003, the album was ranked number 208 on Rolling Stone's 500 Greatest Albums of All Time; it was ranked number 210 in the 2012 list, and number 407 in the 2020 edition. In 2013, the album was ranked 398 on NME's list of the '500 Greatest Albums of all time'. In 2018, the album won the Polaris Heritage Prize Audience Award in the 1960–1975 category.

== Track listing ==
All tracks are written by Neil Young. Track timings are from the original 1969 vinyl release, catalogue number RS 6349.

Side one
No.	Title	Length
1.	"Cinnamon Girl"	2:58
2.	"Everybody Knows This Is Nowhere"	2:26
3.	"Round & Round (It Won't Be Long)"	5:49
4.	"Down by the River"	9:13

Side two
No.	Title	Length
5.	"The Losing End (When You're On)"	4:03
6.	"Running Dry (Requiem for the Rockets)"	5:30
7.	"Cowgirl in the Sand"	10:03

== Personnel ==
- Neil Young – guitar, lead vocals

Crazy Horse

- Danny Whitten – guitar, backing vocals, co-lead vocals on "Cinnamon Girl"
- Billy Talbot – bass guitar
- Ralph Molina – drums, backing vocals

Additional musicians

- Bobby Notkoff – violin on "Running Dry (Requiem for the Rockets)"
- Robin Lane – guitar and harmony vocals on "Round and Round"

Technical

- David Briggs – engineer, producer
- Neil Young – producer
- Henry Saskowski – engineer
- Kendal Pacios – engineer

== Charts ==
=== Weekly charts ===
Year	Chart	Position
1970	Billboard Pop Albums	34
1970	US Cashbox Pop Albums	62
1970	US Record World Pop Albums	31
1970	Canadian Album Charts	32
1972	Spanish Album Charts	18

=== Singles ===
Year	Single	Chart	Position
1970	"Cinnamon Girl"	Billboard Pop Singles	55
1970	"Cinnamon Girl"	US Cashbox Pop Singles	56
1970	"Cinnamon Girl"	US Record World Pop Singles	52

Year End Chart

Year	Chart	Position
1970	Billboard Year End Chart	45

== Certifications ==
Region	Certification	Certified units/sales
United Kingdom (BPI)	Silver	60,000^{*}
United States (RIAA)	Platinum	1,000,000^{^}
^{*} Sales figures based on certification alone.^{^} Shipments figures based on certification alone.
