= Bobby Notkoff =

American violinist (1940–2018)

Bobby Notkoff (31 December 1940 - 5 October 2018) was a violinist who played with The Rockets in the 1960s and Family Lotus in the 1970s. Notkoff was also part of one of the first supergroups Electric Flag, with Mike Bloomfield and Buddy Miles.

If the same person, in 1956, as Robert Notkoff, he was a soloist with the Naumburg Orchestral Concerts, in the Naumburg Bandshell, Central Park, in the summer series.

== Selected discography ==
- 1967 The Trip [Original Soundtrack] - Electric Flag
- 1968 Long Time Comin' - Electric Flag
- 1968 The Rockets (album) - The Rockets
- 1969 Everybody Knows This Is Nowhere - album by Neil Young with Crazy Horse.
- 1971 In My Own Time album - Karen Dalton
- 1972 At Crooked Lake - Crazy Horse
- 1972 Sunset Ride - Zephyr
- 1972 For the Roses - Joni Mitchell
- 1978 Crazy Moon - Crazy Horse
