= Danny Whitten =

American guitarist (1943–1972)

Background information
- Born: Danny Ray Whitten; May 8, 1943; Columbus, Georgia, U.S.
- Died: November 18, 1972 (aged 29) Los Angeles, California, U.S.
- Genres: Hard rock, country rock, blues-rock
- Occupations: Musician, songwriter
- Instruments: Guitar, vocals
- Years active: 1962–1972
- Labels: Liberty, Valiant, Loma, a division of Autumn, White Whale, Reprise

Danny Ray Whitten (May 8, 1943 – November 18, 1972) was an American guitarist and songwriter, best known for his work with Neil Young's backing band Crazy Horse, and for the song "I Don't Want to Talk About It", a hit for Rod Stewart and Everything but the Girl.

== Biography ==
=== Early years ===
Whitten was born on May 8, 1943, in Columbus, Georgia. His parents split up when he was young. He and his sister, Brenda, lived with their mother, who worked long hours as a waitress. His mother remarried when he was nine years old and the family moved to Canton, Ohio.

=== Musical beginnings ===
Whitten joined Billy Talbot, Ralph Molina and Benjamin Rocco in the doo-wop group Danny and the Memories. After recording an obscure single, "Can't Help Loving That Girl of Mine", core members of the group moved to San Francisco where they morphed into a folk-psychedelic rock act called The Psyrcle. Whitten played guitar, Molina drums, and Talbot played bass and piano.

By 1967, the group took on brothers George and Leon Whitsell on additional guitars and vocals, as well as violinist Bobby Notkoff, the sextet calling themselves The Rockets. They signed with independent label White Whale Records, working with producer Barry Goldberg for the group's self-titled album in mid-1968. The album sold poorly.

=== Connection with Neil Young ===
Songwriter Neil Young, fresh from departing Buffalo Springfield, with one album of his own, began jamming with the Rockets and expressed interest in recording with Whitten, Molina and Talbot. The trio agreed, so long as they were allowed to simultaneously continue on with The Rockets. Young acquiesced initially, but imposed a rehearsal schedule that made that an impossibility. At first dubbed "War Babies" by Young, they soon became known as Crazy Horse.

Recording sessions led to Young's second album, Everybody Knows This Is Nowhere, credited as Neil Young with Crazy Horse, with Whitten on second guitar and vocals. Although his role was that of support, Whitten sang the album's opening track "Cinnamon Girl" along with Young, and Whitten and Young shared lead guitar on "Down by the River" and "Cowgirl in the Sand". These tracks would influence the grunge movement of the 1990s, and all three songs remain part of Young's performance repertoire.

=== Drug addiction ===
During that period, Whitten began using heroin. Finding that it mitigated his longstanding battle with rheumatoid arthritis, he quickly became addicted. Although he participated in the early stages of Young's next solo effort, After the Gold Rush, Whitten and the rest of Crazy Horse were dismissed about halfway through the recording sessions, in part because of Whitten's heavy drug use. Whitten performed guitar and vocals on "Oh, Lonesome Me", "I Believe in You", and "When You Dance I Can Really Love". He was also brought in at the end of the sessions to provide harmony vocals on "Tell Me Why", "Only Love Can Break Your Heart", "Cripple Creek Ferry", "Southern Man" and "Till the Morning Comes". Young wrote "The Needle and the Damage Done" during that time, with direct references to Whitten's addiction and its role in the destruction of his talent.

Acquiring a recording contract and expanded to a quintet in 1970, Crazy Horse made their first group-only album, released in early 1971. It included five songs by Whitten, with two standout tracks being a song co-written by Young, that would show up later on a Young album, "(Come On Baby Let's Go) Downtown", and Whitten's most famous composition, "I Don't Want to Talk About It", a heartfelt ballad that has been covered many times and demonstrated his unfulfilled talent.

=== Death ===
Whitten continued to drift, his personal life ruled almost totally by drugs. He was dismissed from Crazy Horse by Talbot and Molina, who used replacements on the band's two albums of 1972. In April of that year, after receiving a call from Young to play rhythm guitar as a member of The Stray Gators on the upcoming tour behind Young's Harvest album, Whitten showed up for rehearsals at Young's home outside San Francisco. While the rest of the group hammered out arrangements, Whitten lagged behind, figuring out the rhythm parts, though never in sync with the rest of the group. Young, who had more at stake after the success of After the Gold Rush and Harvest, fired him from the band on November 18, 1972. He gave Whitten $50 and a plane ticket back to Los Angeles. Later that night Whitten died from ingesting a combination of diazepam, which he was taking for severe knee arthritis, and alcohol, which he was using to try to get over his heroin addiction. In 1973, Charles Perry of Rolling Stone reported that Whitten died of a methaqualone overdose.

Neil Young recalled, "We were rehearsing with him and he just couldn't cut it. He couldn't remember anything. He was too out of it. Too far gone. I had to tell him to go back to L.A. 'It's not happening, man. You're not together enough.' He just said, 'I've got nowhere else to go, man. How am I gonna tell my friends?' And he split. That night the coroner called me and told me he'd died. That blew my mind. Fucking blew my mind. I loved Danny. I felt responsible. And from there, I had to go right out on this huge tour of huge arenas. I was very nervous and ... insecure."

Years later, Young told biographer Jimmy McDonough that for a long time after Whitten died, he felt responsible for Whitten's death. It took him years to stop blaming himself. "Danny just wasn't happy", Young said. "It just all came down on him. He was engulfed by this drug. That was too bad. Because Danny had a lot to give, boy. He was really good."

== Discography ==
- "Surfin' Granny' (A-Side), "Mirror Mirror" (B-Side), Danny & The Memories, Single, Liberty label, 1963 (Not Released)
- "Can't Help Loving That Girl of Mine" (A-Side), "Don't Go" (B-Side), Danny & The Memories, Single, Valiant label, 7/64; re-released 3/65
- "Baby, Don't Do That" (A-Side), (B-Side is unknown), The Psyrcle, Single, Lorna label, 1966 (Not Released)
- The Rockets, The Rockets, Album, White Whale label, 1968
- "Hole In My Pocket" (A-side), "Let Me Go" (B-Side), The Rockets, Single, White Whale label, 1968
- "Hole In My Pocket" (A & B-Sides), The Rockets, Single, White Whale label, 1968 (Promotional/radio release only)
- "Let Me Go" (A & B-Sides), The Rockets, Single, White Whale label, 1968 (Promotional/radio release only)
- Everybody Knows This Is Nowhere, Neil Young & Crazy Horse, Album, Reprise label, 1969
- After the Gold Rush, Neil Young, Album, Reprise label, 1970
- Crazy Horse, Crazy Horse, Album, Reprise label, 1971
- "Downtown" (A-Side), "Crow Jane Lady" (B-Side), Crazy Horse, Single, Reprise label, 1971
- "Dance, Dance, Dance" (A-Side), "Carolay" (B-Side), Crazy Horse, Single, Reprise label, 1971
- "Dirty, Dirty" (A-Side), "Beggar's Day" (B-Side), Crazy Horse, Single, Reprise label 1971
- Tonight's the Night, Neil Young, Album, Reprise, 1975 (recorded 1973, posthumously released)
- Gone Dead Train: The Best of Crazy Horse 1971–1989 Crazy Horse, Album, Raven label, 2005
- Scratchy: The Complete Reprise Recordings, Crazy Horse, Album, Rhino Handmade label, 2005
- Live at the Fillmore East, Neil Young & Crazy Horse, Album, Reprise, 2006 (recorded 1970)
- The Archives Vol. 1 1963–1972 , Neil Young & Crazy Horse, Album, Reprise, 2009
- Early Daze, Neil Young & Crazy Horse, Album, Reprise, 2024 (recorded 1969)

== Songs written by Danny Whitten ==
- "Baby, Don't Do That" (Whitten, Billy Talbot) 1966 Lorna single, produced by Sly Stone
- "Dance To The Music On The Radio" (Whitten, Talbot)
- "Dirty, Dirty" (Whitten)
- "(Come On Baby Let's Go) Downtown" (Whitten, Neil Young)
- "Gone Dead Train" (Whitten)
- "Hole in My Pocket" (Whitten) 1968 White Whale single, produced by Barry Goldberg; also recorded by the 'Barry Goldberg Reunion' on There's No Hole In My Soul for Buddah Records.
- "I Don't Need Nobody (Hangin' Round My Door)" (Whitten)
- "I Don't Want to Talk About It" (Whitten)
- "I'll Get By" (Whitten)
- "Let Me Go" (Whitten) 1968 White Whale single, produced by Barry Goldberg.
- "Look At All The Things" (Whitten)
- "Love Can Be So Bad" (Whitten, Lolly Vegas)
- "May" (Whitten, Talbot)
- "Mr. Chips" (Whitten)
- "Oh Boy" (Whitten)
- "Wasted" (Whitten, Lolly Vegas, Pat Vegas)
- "Whatever" (Whitten, Talbot)
- "Won't You Say You'll Stay" (Whitten)

== See also ==
- Crazy Horse (band)
