= When You Dance I Can Really Love =

Single by Neil Young

from the album After the Gold Rush
- B-side: "Sugar Mountain" "After the Gold Rush" (UK)
- Released: March 1971
- Recorded: April 6, 1970
- Studio: Neil Young's home, Topanga, California
- Genre: Rock
- Length: 3:44
- Label: Reprise
- Songwriter: Neil Young
- Producers: David Briggs; Neil Young

Neil Young singles chronology
"Only Love Can Break Your Heart" (1970)	"When You Dance I Can Really Love" (1971)	"Heart of Gold" (1972)

"When You Dance I Can Really Love" is the ninth track on Canadian musician Neil Young's 1970 album After the Gold Rush. It was written by Young.

== Background ==
The official Neil Young website gives the title as "When You Dance I Can Really Love"; however, the CD release (US catalogue number 2283-2, Europe 7599-27243-2) has the title misprinted as "When You Dance You Can Really Love." The correct title appears on other albums, such as Live Rust. It also appears in Young's handwritten lyrics included with some copies of the album.

Record World said that it "is something new that comes up to [Young's] best work."

== Personnel ==
- Neil Young – guitar, vocals
- Danny Whitten – guitar, vocals
- Jack Nitzsche – piano
- Billy Talbot – bass
- Ralph Molina – drums, vocals
- Nils Lofgren – vocals

== Chart performance ==
It was released as a single in the U.S. in 1971, reaching #93 on the Hot 100, Billboard charts. It was also released as a single in Japan.
