= Greg Reeves =

American bass guitarist

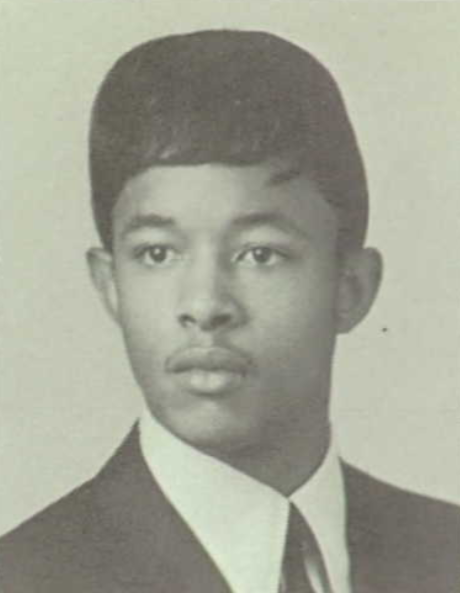
- Reeves in 1968

Background information
- Born: 1949 or 1950 (age 74–75)
- Origin: Warren, Ohio, U.S.
- Genres: R&B; rock
- Occupation: Musician
- Instrument: Bass guitar
- Years active: 1968–present

Gregory Allen Reeves (born 1949 or 1950) is an American bass guitarist. He is best known for playing bass on Crosby, Stills, Nash & Young's album Déjà Vu (1970).

== Early life ==
Reeves grew up in Warren, Ohio, and graduated from Warren Western Reserve High School in 1968. In an interview, bandmate Dallas Taylor spoke of a rumor that Reeves was as young as 15 years old when he joined CSNY. While Reeves acknowledged having a fake ID and being "very young" while with CSNY, Rolling Stone stated his age as 19 in a December 1969 article.

== Career ==
=== Motown ===
Reeves had been scouted as a session musician at the age of 12 by Motown Records and Chess Records, although his mother "would not hear of" him playing professionally at that age. By 1968, however, Reeves was employed as a session bassist at Motown. During the recording session for The Temptations' "Cloud Nine", Reeves was apprehensive about his bass playing and switched to tambourine at the behest of producer Norman Whitfield, his recruiter and main benefactor at Motown. During this period, Reeves was also mentored by other Motown musicians, including Rick James (who concurrently played alongside Reeves in Salt 'n' Pepa, a Los Angeles rock group formed from the remnants of Merryweather) and James Jamerson. Reeves stated that his most notable performance for the company was the bass part (overdubbed in Los Angeles) of "No Matter What Sign You Are", the final song recorded by Diana Ross with The Supremes.

=== Work with CSNY ===
Reeves recorded and toured with Crosby, Stills, Nash & Young from August 1969 to January 1970 and is credited on the cover of their 1970 Déjà Vu album; he appears with the group in the concert documentary Celebration at Big Sur (filmed in September 1969) and in contemporaneous television appearances on This Is Tom Jones and The Music Scene.

Reeves was living with mentor Rick James in Los Angeles when he was recruited for CSNY:

David [Crosby] and Graham [Nash] drove up to the apartment where we lived on Olive Drive at the time ... from the pool I saw them knock on the door, and Rick yelled for me. They asked Rick James who I was and Rick came, got me and brought me out front to the limousine that Graham Nash and David Crosby were in and asked me in front of them, would I mind going with them to jam. I asked Rick James "Aren't you coming, too?" He said "They want you to come alone." I went back to the house, grabbed my Fender Precision Bass guitar and Gibson acoustic guitar, climbed into the limousine and never came back to Rick's house again. They would not let me go. From the first time jamming with me, they would not let me leave ... to this day I don't how Graham and David knew where Rick and I lived.

In consultation with other band members, Stephen Stills fired Reeves from the group in April 1970 "because [Reeves] suddenly decided he was an Apache witch doctor." Stills further opined that Reeves "freaked too much on the bass and no one could keep up because [he] did not play one rhythm the same. He could play bass imaginatively, but he has to be predictable as well", while Reeves also wanted to sing some of his songs during CSN&Y shows, which Stills thought was "ludicrous, only because the songs weren't great. We'll sing any song if it's great, but not just because it happens to be written by our bass player." Dallas Taylor (who seldom fraternized with Reeves and was dismissed from the group a month later at the instigation of Neil Young) later noted that while Reeves and Stills did not get along, Reeves and Young were good friends. Following Reeves's termination, Young defied his bandmates and continued to collaborate with Reeves. Reeves has alleged that the "bass hook" of one of his songs was appropriated by Stills for the main riff of "Carry On". Heeding the advice of James, he demurred from pursuing the issue after receiving a profit point on Déjà Vu. Although he has conceded that "[the band] thought I was trying to put spells on them" due to his strong interest in Native American shamanism, Reeves ultimately ascribed his termination to "Stills [having] a problem with himself, just dealing with himself."

=== Post CSNY ===
Reeves's song "I Got Your Number" has been recorded by artists including Tom Jones, Boz Scaggs, and Johnny Bristol. Reeves was incarcerated in Mexico from September 1977 to April 1978, saying that he "spent time ... with the Mexican president's nephew as a political prisoner, because we had tried to smuggle marijuana across the border ... Neil Young sent me money (via Western Union) to pay the Mexican police (Judicial Government Police) for my freedom."

His 1978 $1 million lawsuit pertaining to unpaid CSN&Y royalties was eventually settled amicably. In the aftermath of his tenure with the group, Reeves nevertheless contributed in earnest to several projects, including most of Young's After the Gold Rush, Crosby & Nash's eponymous debut ("Immigration Man"; 1972), Dave Mason's It's Like You Never Left (1973), an unreleased version of "Tonight's the Night" recorded by Young in early 1974, and indeterminate recordings with George Clinton following the temporary dissolution of Parliament Funkadelic in the early 1980s. Nils Lofgren said that during one of the sessions for After the Gold Rush, Reeves appeared covered head to toe in gold paint; Young explained the bassist was "doin' his Indian thing."

Reeves was briefly interviewed by author Jimmy McDonough for Shakey, a 2003 biography of Neil Young. Both Young and Lofgren continue to laud Reeves's playing style, noting his versatility and ability to move fluidly between simple and complex bass lines.

== Bibliography ==
- Zimmer, D. and Diltz, H. (2000). Crosby, Stills & Nash: the authorized biography, page 94. Da Capo Press, 2000.
