= The Archives Vol. 1 1963–1972 =

Neil Young Archives Vol. 1 1963–1972

Box set by Neil Young
- Released: June 2, 2009
- Recorded: 1963–1972
- Venue: Various
- Studio: Various
- Genres: Rock; folk rock
- Length: 458:51
- Label: Reprise
- Producers: Neil Young; Bob Bradburn; Ray Dee; Comrie Smith; Peter K. Siegel; Charles Green; Brian Stone; Ahmet Ertegun; Jack Nitzsche; David Briggs; Ry Cooder; Paul Rothchild; Graham Nash

Neil Young chronology
Fork in the Road (2009)	Neil Young Archives Vol. 1 1963–1972 (2009)	Dreamin' Man Live '92 (2009)

Professional ratings
Aggregate scores
Source	Rating
Metacritic	92/100
Review scores
Source	Rating
AllMusic	4.5/5 stars
The A.V. Club	A−
Entertainment Weekly	B+
The Guardian	4/5 stars
Now	NNNNN
The Observer	5/5 stars
Paste	3.5/10
Pitchfork	7.0/10
Rolling Stone	4.5/5 stars
Uncut	5/5 stars

Neil Young Archives Vol. 1: 1963–1972 is the first in a planned series of box sets of archival material by Canadian-American musician Neil Young. It was released on June 2, 2009, in three different formats: a set of 10 Blu-ray discs in order to present high-resolution audio as well as accompanying visual documentation, a set of 10 DVDs, and a more basic 8-CD set. Covering Young's early years with The Squires and Buffalo Springfield, it also includes various demos, outtakes and alternate versions of songs from his albums Neil Young, Everybody Knows This Is Nowhere, After the Gold Rush, and Harvest, as well as tracks he recorded with Crazy Horse and Crosby, Stills, Nash & Young during this time. Also included in the set are several live discs, as well as (on the Blu-Ray/DVD versions) a copy of the long out-of-print film Journey Through the Past, directed by Young in the early 1970s.

On January 31, 2010, the box set won the Grammy Award for Best Boxed or Special Limited Edition Package, a win shared by Neil Young along with his art directors Gary Burden and Jenice Heo. Neil Young Archives Volume II: 1972–1976 did not follow until November 2020, covering his work from 1972 to 1976, and was released only as a 10-CD box set. Neil Young Archives Volume III: 1976–1987 would follow in 2024, with a preorder announced on July 25 and an official release date set for September 6. The set, covering his work from 1976 to 1987, would be spread across 17 CDs and 5 Blu-rays, the latter of which would include 11 films. A pre-order would include a CD titled Takes, set to include a track each from 16 of the 17 CDs.

== Background ==
This is the first of several projected box sets in the Neil Young Archives series, which will eventually chronicle the artist's entire career. The box, which won a Grammy Award for Best Boxed or Special Limited Edition Package, features previously released as well as rare and unreleased material from the first decade of Young's career, spanning his Winnipeg years with the Squires, Buffalo Springfield, Crazy Horse, Crosby, Stills, Nash & Young and his first several solo albums.

After conflicting statements over the years, it was eventually revealed that the set would be released in three formats: CD, DVD, and Blu-ray. The DVD and Blu-ray editions contain 10 discs (including Journey Through The Past released for the first time on DVD and Blu-ray) and a 236-page full-color hardbound book in special packaging, while those with the Blu-ray edition would receive free online updates in perpetuity (though the last update was posted in April 2010, with all BD Live updates eventually being pulled altogether in early 2016). The CD set has 8 CDs (Discs 00 & 01 fit on one disc, and Disc 09 is not included) and a CD-sized booklet. Each disc in the Archives was also available individually exclusively through Warner Bros. at launch. CD, DVD and Blu-ray box set pre-orders from Warner Bros. also included a 7" 45 RPM single with "Aurora" and "Mustang" from Disc 00. In addition, people who pre-ordered the DVD and Blu-ray box sets received, in early May, a bonus copy of Disc 00 (Blu-ray only) so that they could "test drive" the contents. All DVD and Blu-ray box sets also included a card with a code for downloading MP3s of all the tracks in the box set.

Of the 137 tracks on the track listing, 47 were previously unreleased. These included live versions and alternate mixes of previously released songs. Thirteen of the songs on this set had previously never been released in any form. The 10-disc sets included several 'hidden tracks,' which were not included in the 8-CD set.

The audio format on the Blu-ray version is presented in 24-bit/192 kHz stereo PCM on all discs except Journey Through The Past which includes selectable DTS Surround or stereo 24-bit/96 kHz PCM tracks. The DVD version includes a 24-bit/96 kHz stereo PCM track, while the CDs are in the standard 16-bit/44.1 kHz format.

== Track listing ==
=== Disc 00 – Early Years (1963–1965) ===
1. "Aurora" (2:07) – The Squires – from the 45 RPM single (mono)
  - Neil Young – guitar; Allan Bates – guitar; Ken Koblun – bass; Ken Smyth – drums; Bob Bradbum – voice
  - Recorded at CKRC, Winnipeg, MB, 7/23/1963. Produced by Bob Bradburn.
2. "The Sultan" (2:32) – The Squires – from the 45 RPM single (mono)
  - Neil Young – guitar; Allan Bates – guitar; Ken Koblun – bass; Ken Smyth – drums, gong
  - Recorded at CKRC, Winnipeg, MB, 7/23/1963. Produced by Bob Bradburn.
3. "I Wonder" (2:21) – The Squires – previously unreleased song (mono)
  - Neil Young – guitar, vocal; Allan Bates – guitar; Ken Koblun – bass; Ken Smyth – drums
  - Recorded at CKRC, Winnipeg, MB, 4/2/1964. Produced by Bob Bradburn.
4. "Mustang" (2:23) – The Squires – previously unreleased instrumental (mono)
  - Neil Young – guitar; Allan Bates – guitar; Ken Koblun – bass; Ken Smyth – drums
  - Recorded at CKRC, Winnipeg, MB, 4/2/1964. Produced by Bob Bradburn.
5. "I'll Love You Forever" (3:22) – The Squires – previously unreleased song (mono)
  - Neil Young – guitar, vocal; Ken Koblun – bass; Bill Edmondson – drums
  - Recorded at CJLX, Fort William, ON, 11/23/1964. Produced by Ray Dee.
6. "(I'm a Man and) I Can't Cry" (2:30) – The Squires – previously unreleased song (mono)
  - Neil Young – guitar, vocal; Doug Campbell – guitar; Ken Koblun – bass; Randy Peterson – drums
  - Recorded at Basement, Winnipeg, MB, 3/8-12/1965. Produced by Neil Young.
7. "Hello Lonely Woman" (3:57) – Neil Young & Comrie Smith – previously unreleased song
  - Neil Young – guitar, harmonica, vocal; Comrie Smith – guitar
  - Recorded at 26 Golfdale, Toronto, ON, 10/15/1965. Produced by Neil Young & Comrie Smith.
8. "Casting Me Away from You" (2:13) – Neil Young & Comrie Smith – previously unreleased song
  - Neil Young – guitar, vocal; Comrie Smith – guitar, vocal
  - Recorded at 26 Golfdale, Toronto, ON, 10/15/1965. Produced by Neil Young & Comrie Smith.
9. "There Goes My Babe" (2:23) – Neil Young & Comrie Smith – previously unreleased song
  - Neil Young – guitar, vocal; Comrie Smith – guitar, vocal
  - Recorded at 26 Golfdale, Toronto, ON, 10/15/1965. Produced by Neil Young & Comrie Smith.
10. "Sugar Mountain" (2:43) – previously unreleased demo version (mono)
  - Neil Young – guitar, vocal
  - Recorded at Elektra Audition Demos Records, New York City, 12/15/1965. Produced by Peter K. Siegel & Neil Young.
11. "Nowadays Clancy Can't Even Sing" (3:05) – previously unreleased demo version (mono)
  - Neil Young – guitar, vocal
  - Recorded at Elektra Audition Demos Records, New York City, 12/15/1965. Produced by Peter K. Siegel & Neil Young.
12. "Runaround Babe" (2:39) – previously unreleased song (mono)
  - Neil Young – guitar, vocal
  - Recorded at Elektra Audition Demos Records, New York City, 12/15/1965. Produced by Peter K. Siegel & Neil Young.
13. "The Ballad of Peggy Grover" (3:51, 2:48 on CD) – previously unreleased song (mono)
  - Neil Young – guitar, vocal
  - Recorded at Elektra Audition Demos Records, New York City, 12/15/1965. Produced by Peter K. Siegel & Neil Young.
14. "The Rent Is Always Due" (2:54) – previously unreleased song (mono)
  - Neil Young – guitar, vocal
  - Recorded at Elektra Audition Demos Records, New York City, 12/15/1965. Produced by Peter K. Siegel & Neil Young.
15. "Extra, Extra" (2:41) – previously unreleased song (mono)
  - Neil Young – guitar, vocal
  - Recorded at Elektra Audition Demos Records, New York City, 12/15/1965. Produced by Peter K. Siegel & Neil Young.
16. "I Wonder" – The Squires – previously unreleased alternate version (mono) (hidden track)
  - Neil Young – guitar, vocal; Ken Koblun – bass; Bill Edmondson – drums
  - Recorded at CJLX, Fort William, ON, 11/23/1964. Produced by Ray Dee.
17. "Nowadays Clancy Can't Even Sing" – Buffalo Springfield – from the album Buffalo Springfield (mono) (hidden track)
  - Richie Furay – guitar, vocal; Stephen Stills – guitar, vocal; Neil Young – guitar, harmonica, vocal; Bruce Palmer – bass; Dewey Martin – drums
  - Recorded at Gold Star Recording Studios, Hollywood, 7/18/1966. Produced by Charles Greene & Brian Stone.

=== Disc 01 – Early Years (1966–1968) ===
1. "Flying on the Ground Is Wrong" (3:08) – from the Buffalo Springfield Box Set (mono)
  - Neil Young – guitar, vocal
  - Recorded at Gold Star Recording Studios, Hollywood, 7/1/1966. Produced by Charles Greene & Brian Stone.
2. "Burned" (2:16) – Buffalo Springfield – from the album Buffalo Springfield (mono)
  - Neil Young – guitar, piano, vocal; Stephen Stills – guitar, vocal; Richie Furay – guitar, vocal; Bruce Palmer - bass; Dewey Martin – drums
  - Recorded at Gold Star Recording Studios, Hollywood, 8/15/1966. Produced by Charles Greene & Brian Stone.
3. "Out of My Mind" (3:05) – Buffalo Springfield – from the album Buffalo Springfield (mono)
  - Neil Young – guitar, vocal; Stephen Stills – guitar, vocal; Richie Furay – guitar, vocal; Bruce Palmer – bass; Dewey Martin – drums
  - Recorded at Gold Star Recording Studios, Hollywood, 8/15/1966. Produced by Charles Greene & Brian Stone.
4. "Down, Down, Down" (2:11) – from the Buffalo Springfield Box Set (mono)
  - Neil Young – guitar, vocal
  - Recorded at Gold Star Studios, Hollywood, 9/5/1966. Produced by Charles Greene & Brian Stone.
5. "Kahuna Sunset" (2:52) – Buffalo Springfield – from the Buffalo Springfield Box Set (mono)
  - Neil Young – guitar; Stephen Stills – guitar; Richie Furay – guitar; Bruce Palmer – bass; Dewey Martin – drums; Cyrus Faryar – percussion
  - Recorded at Gold Star Studios, Hollywood, 9/15/1966. Produced by Charles Greene & Brian Stone.
6. "Mr. Soul" (2:44) – Buffalo Springfield – from the Buffalo Springfield Box Set (mono)
  - Neil Young – guitar, vocal; Stephen Stills – guitar, vocal; Richie Furay – guitar, vocal; Bruce Palmer – bass; Dewey Martin – drums
  - Recorded at Atlantic Studios, New York City, 1/9/1967. Produced by Charles Greene & Brian Stone (with Stills & Young).
7. "Sell Out" (1:40) – Buffalo Springfield – previously unreleased song from Buffalo Springfield Again sessions (mono)
  - Neil Young – guitar, vocal; Stephen Stills – guitar; Richie Furay – guitar; Bruce Palmer – bass; Dewey Martin – drums
  - Recorded at Gold Star Studios, Hollywood, 2/1967. Produced by Neil Young.
8. "Down to the Wire" (2:29) – Buffalo Springfield – from the album Decade (mono)
  - Neil Young – guitar, vocal; Stephen Stills – guitar, vocal; Richie Furay – vocal; Mac Rebennack – piano; Bobby West – bass; Jesse Hill – drums, timpani
  - Recorded at Gold Star Studios & Columbia Recording Studio, Hollywood, 3/28/1967, 3/30-4/18/1967. Produced by Ahmet Ertegun.
9. "Expecting to Fly" (3:45) – Buffalo Springfield – from the album Buffalo Springfield Again
  - Neil Young – guitar, vocal; Jack Nitzsche – electric piano; Don Randi – piano, harpsichord; Russ Titelman – guitar; Carol Kaye – bass; Jim Gordon – drums; Choir – Merry Clayton, Brenda Holloway, Patrice Holloway, Gloria Jones, Sherlie Matthews, Gracia Nitzsche; Also – English horn, vibes, timpani, strings
  - Recorded at Sunset Sound, Hollywood, 5/6/1967. Produced by Jack Nitzsche & Neil Young.
10. "Slowly Burning" (2:58) – previously unreleased instrumental from Buffalo Springfield Again sessions
  - Neil Young – guitar; Jack Nitzsche – electric piano; Don Randi – piano, harpsichord; Russ Titelman – guitar; Carol Kaye – bass; Jim Gordon – drums; Also – English horn, vibes, timpani, strings, sleigh bells
  - Recorded at Sunset Sound, Hollywood, 5/6/1967. Produced by Jack Nitzsche & Neil Young.
11. "One More Sign" (2:01) – from the Buffalo Springfield Box Set
  - Neil Young – guitar, vocal
  - Recorded at Gold Star Studios, Hollywood, 8/12/1967. Produced by Neil Young.
12. "Broken Arrow" (6:13) – Buffalo Springfield – from the album Buffalo Springfield Again
  - Neil Young – guitar, vocal; Richie Furay – guitar, vocal; Stephen Stills – guitar; Chris Sarns – guitar; Don Randi – piano, organ; Bruce Palmer – bass; Dewey Martin – Drums, vocal; Also – strings. Jazz theme: Don Randi – piano; Jim Horn – clarinet; Hal Blaine – drums; Also – bass
  - Recorded at Columbia Recording Studio & Sunset Sound, Hollywood, 8/25/1967, 9/5-18/1967. Produced by Neil Young.
13. "I Am a Child" (2:19) – Buffalo Springfield – from the album Last Time Around
  - Neil Young – guitar, harmonica, vocal; Gary Marker – bass; Dewey Martin – drums
  - Recorded at Sunset Sound, Hollywood, 2/5/1968. Produced by Neil Young.
14. "Do I Have to Come Right Out and Say It?" – Buffalo Springfield – from the album Buffalo Springfield (mono) [hidden track]
  - Richie Furay – guitar, vocal; Stephen Stills – guitar, vocal; Neil Young – guitar, vocal; Bruce Palmer – bass; Dewey Martin – drums
  - Recorded at Gold Star Recording Studios, Hollywood, August, 1966. Produced by Charles Greene & Brian Stone.
15. "Flying on the Ground is Wrong" – Buffalo Springfield – from the album Buffalo Springfield (mono) [hidden track]
  - Richie Furay – guitar, vocal; Stephen Stills – guitar, vocal; Neil Young – guitar, vocal; Bruce Palmer – bass; Dewey Martin – drums
  - Recorded at Gold Star Studios & Columbia Recording Studio, Hollywood, 9/10-11/1966. Produced by Charles Greene & Brian Stone.
16. "For What It's Worth" – Buffalo Springfield – from the album Buffalo Springfield – second version (mono) [hidden track]
  - Stephen Stills – guitar, vocal; Richie Furay – guitar, vocal; Neil Young – guitar; Bruce Palmer – bass; Dewey Martin – drums, vocal
  - Recorded at Columbia Recording Studio, Hollywood, 12/5/1966. Produced by Charles Greene & Brian Stone (with Stills & Young).
17. "This Is It!" – Buffalo Springfield – previously unreleased montage (mono) of excerpts from their final concert [hidden track]
  - Stephen Stills – guitar, vocal; Richie Furay – guitar, vocal; Neil Young – guitar, vocal; Jim Messina – bass; Dewey Martin – drums
  - Recorded at Long Beach Sports Arena, Long Beach, 5/5/1968. Produced by Neil Young.

=== Disc 02 – Topanga 1 (1968–1969) ===
1. "Everybody Knows This Is Nowhere" (2:15) – from the stereo promotional 45 RPM single - second pressing
  - Neil Young – guitar, vocal; Jim Messina – bass; George Grantham – drums; Also – flute
  - Recorded at Wally Heider Recording Studios, Hollywood, 8/23/1968. Produced by David Briggs & Neil Young.
2. "The Loner" (3:50) – from the album Neil Young
  - Neil Young – guitar, pipe organ, vocal; Jim Messina – bass; George Grantham – drums; Also – strings and celli
  - Recorded at TTG Recording Studios, Los Angeles, 9/28/1968. Produced by David Briggs & Neil Young.
3. "Birds" (2:15) – previously unreleased version from Neil Young sessions
  - Neil Young – guitar, piano, vocal; Jim Messina – bass; George Grantham – drums
  - Recorded at TTG Recording Studios, Los Angeles, 9/28/1968. Produced by David Briggs & Neil Young.
4. "What Did You Do to My Life?" (1:53) – previously unreleased mix from Neil Young sessions
  - Neil Young – guitar, vocal; Jim Messina – bass; George Grantham – drums
  - Recorded at TTG Recording Studios, Los Angeles, 9/28/1968. Produced by David Briggs & Neil Young.
5. "The Last Trip to Tulsa" (9:27) – from the album Neil Young
  - Neil Young – guitar, vocal
  - Recorded at TTG Recording Studios, Los Angeles, 10/1/1968. Produced by David Briggs & Neil Young.
6. "Here We Are in the Years" (3:17) – from the album Neil Young – second version
  - Neil Young – guitar, piano, organ, harpsichord, vocal; Jim Messina – bass; George Grantham – drums; Also – strings
  - Recorded at TTG Recording Studios, Los Angeles, 10/2/1968. Produced by David Briggs & Neil Young.
7. "I've Been Waiting for You" (2:28) – previously unreleased mix from Neil Young sessions
  - Neil Young – guitar, piano, organ, vocal; Jim Messina – bass; George Grantham – drums
  - Recorded at TTG Recording Studios, Los Angeles, 10/9/1968. Produced by David Briggs & Neil Young.
8. "The Old Laughing Lady" (6:00) – from the album Neil Young
  - Neil Young – vocal; Ry Cooder – guitar; Jack Nitzsche – electric piano; Carol Kaye – bass; Earl Palmer – drums; Choir: Merry Clayton, Brenda Holloway, Patrice Holloway, Gloria Jones, Sherlie Matthews, and Gracia Nitzsche; Also – trumpet, trombone, tenor sax, French horn, clarinet, strings and timpani
  - Recorded at Sunwest Recording Studios, Hollywood, 10/17/1968. Produced by Jack Nitzsche, Ry Cooder & Neil Young.
9. "I've Loved Her So Long" (2:44) – from the album Neil Young
  - Neil Young – vocal; Ry Cooder – guitar; Jack Nitzsche – electric piano; Jim Messina – bass; Earl Palmer – drums; Choir: Merry Clayton, Brenda Holloway, Patrice Holloway, Gloria Jones, Sherlie Matthews, and Gracia Nitzsche; Also – piano, trumpet, trombone, oboe, clarinet, strings and timpani
  - Recorded at Sunwest Recording Studios, Hollywood, 10/17/1968. Produced by Jack Nitzsche, Ry Cooder & Neil Young.
10. "Sugar Mountain" (6:16) – from Volume 00 — Sugar Mountain – Live At Canterbury House 1968
  - Neil Young – guitar, vocal
  - Recorded at Canterbury House, Ann Arbor, MI, 11/10/1968. Produced by Neil Young.
11. "Nowadays Clancy Can't Even Sing" (5:21) — from Volume 00 — Sugar Mountain – Live At Canterbury House 1968
  - Neil Young – guitar, vocal
  - Recorded at Canterbury House, Ann Arbor, MI, 11/10/1968. Produced by Neil Young.
12. "Down By the River" (9:17) – Neil Young with Crazy Horse – from the album Everybody Knows This Is Nowhere
  - Neil Young – guitar, vocal; Danny Whitten – guitar, vocal; Billy Talbot – bass; Ralph Molina – drums, vocal
  - Recorded at Wally Heider Recording Studios, Hollywood, 1/17/1969. Produced by David Briggs & Neil Young.
13. "Cowgirl in the Sand" (10:06) – Neil Young with Crazy Horse – from the album Everybody Knows This Is Nowhere
  - Neil Young – guitar, vocal; Danny Whitten – guitar, vocal; Billy Talbot – bass; Ralph Molina – drums, vocal
  - Recorded at Wally Heider Recording Studios, Hollywood, 1/18/1969. Produced by David Briggs & Neil Young.
14. "Everybody Knows This Is Nowhere" (2:29) – Neil Young with Crazy Horse – from the album Everybody Knows This Is Nowhere
  - Neil Young – guitar, vocal; Danny Whitten – guitar, vocal; Billy Talbot – bass; Ralph Molina – drums, vocal
  - Recorded at Wally Heider Recording Studios, Hollywood, 1/23/1969. Produced by David Briggs & Neil Young.
15. "The Emperor of Wyoming" – from the album Neil Young [hidden track]
  - Neil Young – guitar; Jim Messina – bass; George Grantham – drums; Also – strings
  - Recorded at Wally Heider Recording Studios, Hollywood, 8/23/1968. Produced by David Briggs & Neil Young.

=== Disc 03 – Live at the Riverboat (Toronto 1969) ===
1. Emcee Intro. / Sugar Mountain Intro. (1:18)
2. "Sugar Mountain" (5:34) – previously unreleased live version
3. Incredible Doctor Rap (3:10)
4. "The Old Laughing Lady" (5:14) – previously unreleased live version
5. Audience Observation / Dope Song / Band Names Rap (2:59)
6. "Flying on the Ground Is Wrong" (3:58) – previously unreleased live version
7. On the Way Home Intro. (:25)
8. "On the Way Home" (2:40) – previously unreleased live version
9. Set Break / Emcee Intro. (1:20)
10. "I've Loved Her So Long" (2:13) – previously unreleased live version
11. Allen A-Dale Rap (2:20)
12. "I Am a Child" (2:27) – previously unreleased live version
13. "1956 Bubblegum Disaster" (2:04) – previously unreleased song
14. "The Last Trip to Tulsa" (7:00) – previously unreleased live version
15. Words Rap (2:14)
16. "Broken Arrow" (4:38) – previously unreleased live version
17. Turn Down the Lights Rap (:53)
18. "Whiskey Boot Hill" (2:22) – previously unreleased live version
19. Expecting to Fly Intro. (:54)
20. "Expecting to Fly" (2:55) – previously unreleased live version
  - Neil Young – guitar, vocal (all tracks)
  - Recorded at The Riverboat, Toronto, ON, 2/7-2/9/1969. Produced by Neil Young.

=== Disc 04 – Topanga 2 (1969–1970) ===
1. "Cinnamon Girl" (3:00) – Neil Young with Crazy Horse – from the album Everybody Knows This Is Nowhere
  - Neil Young – guitar, vocal; Danny Whitten – guitar, vocal; Billy Talbot – bass; Ralph Molina – drums, vocal
  - Recorded at Wally Heider Recording Studios, Hollywood, 3/20/1969. Produced by David Briggs & Neil Young.
2. "Running Dry (Requiem for the Rockets)" (5:35) – Neil Young with Crazy Horse – from the album Everybody Knows This Is Nowhere
  - Neil Young – guitar, vocal; Danny Whitten – guitar, vocal; Bobby Notkoff – violin; Billy Talbot – bass; Ralph Molina – drums, vocal
  - Recorded at Wally Heider Recording Studios, Hollywood, 3/20/1969. Produced by David Briggs & Neil Young.
3. "Round And Round (It Won't Be Long)" (5:54) – Neil Young with Crazy Horse – from the album Everybody Knows This Is Nowhere
  - Neil Young – guitar, vocal; Danny Whitten – guitar, vocal; Robin Lane – vocal
  - Recorded at Sunwest Recording Studios, Hollywood, 3/24/1969. Produced by David Briggs & Neil Young.
4. "Oh Lonesome Me" (4:00) – Neil Young with Crazy Horse – previously unreleased stereo mix from After the Gold Rush sessions
  - Neil Young – guitar, piano, harmonica, vocal; Danny Whitten – guitar, vocal; Billy Talbot – bass; Ralph Molina – drums, vocal
  - Recorded at Sunset Sound, Hollywood, 8/2/1969. Produced by David Briggs & Neil Young.
5. "Birds" (1:37) – Neil Young with Crazy Horse – from the 45 RPM single (mono) of "Only Love Can Break Your Heart"
  - Neil Young – guitar, piano, vocal; Danny Whitten – guitar, vocal; Billy Talbot – bass; Ralph Molina – drums, vocal
  - Recorded at Sunset Sound, Hollywood, 8/3/1969. Produced by David Briggs & Neil Young.
6. "Everybody's Alone" (2:31) – Neil Young with Crazy Horse – previously unreleased song from After the Gold Rush sessions
  - Neil Young – guitar, piano, vocal; Danny Whitten – guitar, vocal; Billy Talbot – bass; Ralph Molina – drums, vocal
  - Recorded at Sunset Sound, Hollywood, 8/4/1969. Produced by David Briggs & Neil Young.
7. "I Believe in You" (3:28) – Neil Young with Crazy Horse – from the album After the Gold Rush
  - Neil Young – guitar, piano, vibes, vocal; Danny Whitten – guitar, vocal; Billy Talbot – bass; Ralph Molina – drums, vocal
  - Recorded at Sunset Sound, Hollywood, 8/5/1969. Produced by David Briggs & Neil Young.
8. "Sea of Madness" (3:16) – Crosby, Stills, Nash & Young – from the album Woodstock: Music from the Original Soundtrack and More
  - Neil Young – organ, vocal; Stephen Stills – guitar, vocal; David Crosby – guitar, vocal; Graham Nash – percussion, vocal; Greg Reeves - bass; Dallas Taylor – drums
  - Recorded at Fillmore East, New York City, 9/20/1969. Produced by Crosby, Stills, Nash & Young and Paul Rothchild.
9. "Dance Dance Dance" (2:24) – Neil Young with Crazy Horse – previously unreleased version from After the Gold Rush sessions
  - Neil Young – guitar, vocal; Danny Whitten – guitar, vocal; Billy Talbot – bass; Ralph Molina – drums, vocal; Jack Nitzsche - tambourine
  - Recorded at Larrabee Studios, Hollywood, 10/17/1969. Produced by Jack Nitzsche & Neil Young.
10. "Country Girl" (5:11) – Crosby, Stills, Nash & Young – from the album Déjà Vu
  - Neil Young – guitar, organ, harmonica, vocal; Stephen Stills – guitar, vocal; David Crosby – guitar, vocal; Graham Nash – guitar, vocal; Greg Reeves - bass; Dallas Taylor – drums
  - Recorded at Wally Heider Studios, San Francisco, 11/5/1969. Produced by CSN&Y.
11. "Helpless" (3:45) – Crosby, Stills, Nash & Young – previously unreleased mix from Déjà Vu sessions
  - Neil Young – acoustic guitar, harmonica, vocal; Stephen Stills – lead guitar, piano, vocal; David Crosby – vocal; Graham Nash – guitar, vocal; Greg Reeves - bass; Dallas Taylor – drums
  - Recorded at Wally Heider Studios, San Francisco, 11/7/1969. Produced by CSN&Y.
12. "It Might Have Been" (4:18) – Neil Young with Crazy Horse – previously unreleased live version
  - Neil Young – guitar, vocal; Danny Whitten – guitar, vocal; Jack Nitzsche – piano; Billy Talbot – bass; Ralph Molina – drums, vocal
  - Recorded at Music Hall, Cincinnati, OH, 2/25/1970. Produced by Neil Young.
13. "I Believe in You" – Neil Young with Crazy Horse – previously unreleased mix from After the Gold Rush sessions [hidden track]
  - Neil Young – guitar, piano, vocal, sleigh bells; Danny Whitten – guitar, vocal; Billy Talbot – bass; Ralph Molina – drums, vocal
  - Recorded at Sunset Sound, Hollywood, CA, 8/5/1969. Produced by David Briggs & Neil Young.
14. "I've Loved Her So Long" – Crosby, Stills, Nash & Young – previously unreleased live version (mono) [hidden track]
  - Neil Young – guitar, vocal; Graham Nash – vocal
  - Recorded at Greek Theatre, Los Angeles, 8/28/1969. Produced by Crosby, Stills, Nash & Young.

=== Disc 05 – Live at the Fillmore East (New York 1970) ===
1. "Everybody Knows This Is Nowhere" (3:36)
2. "Winterlong" (3:40)
3. "Down By the River" (12:22)
4. "Wonderin'" (3:35)
5. "Come On Baby Let's Go Downtown" (3:51)
6. "Cowgirl in the Sand" (16:09)
  - Neil Young – guitar, vocal; Danny Whitten – guitar, vocal; Jack Nitzsche – piano; Billy Talbot – bass; Ralph Molina – drums, vocal (all tracks)
  - Recorded at Fillmore East, New York City, 3/6 and 3/7/1970. Produced by Paul Rothchild.

=== Disc 06 – Topanga 3 (1970) ===
1. "Tell Me Why" (2:57) – from the album After the Gold Rush
  - Neil Young – guitar, vocal; Nils Lofgren – guitar, vocal; Ralph Molina – vocal
  - Recorded at Home Studio, Topanga, CA, 3/12/1970. Produced by David Briggs & Neil Young.
2. "After the Gold Rush" (3:46) – from the album After the Gold Rush
  - Neil Young – piano, vocal; Bill Peterson - flugelhorn
  - Recorded at Home Studio, Topanga, CA, 3/12/1970. Produced by David Briggs & Neil Young.
3. "Only Love Can Break Your Heart" (3:09) – from the album After the Gold Rush
  - Neil Young – guitar, vocal; Danny Whitten – guitar, vocal; Nils Lofgren – piano; Greg Reeves – bass; Ralph Molina – drums, vocal
  - Recorded at Home Studio, Topanga, CA, 3/15/1970. Produced by David Briggs & Neil Young.
4. "Wonderin'" (2:10) – previously unreleased version from After the Gold Rush sessions
  - Neil Young – guitar, vocal; Nils Lofgren – piano, vocal; Greg Reeves – bass; Ralph Molina – drums, vocal
  - Recorded at Home Studio, Topanga, CA, 3/15/1970. Produced by David Briggs & Neil Young.
5. "Don't Let It Bring You Down" (2:57) – from the album After the Gold Rush – first pressing
  - Neil Young – guitar, vocal; Nils Lofgren – piano; Greg Reeves – bass; Ralph Molina – drums
  - Recorded at Home Studio, Topanga, CA, 3/17/1970. Produced by David Briggs & Neil Young.
6. "Cripple Creek Ferry" (1:34) – from the album After the Gold Rush
  - Neil Young – piano, vocal; Danny Whitten – guitar, vocal; Greg Reeves – bass; Ralph Molina – drums, vocal
  - Recorded at Home Studio, Topanga, CA, 3/17/1970. Produced by David Briggs & Neil Young.
7. "Southern Man" (5:31) – from the album After the Gold Rush
  - Neil Young – guitar, vocal; Nils Lofgren – piano, vocal; Greg Reeves – bass; Ralph Molina – drums, vocal; Danny Whitten – vocal
  - Recorded at Home Studio, Topanga, CA, 3/19/1970. Produced by David Briggs & Neil Young.
8. "Till the Morning Comes" (1:16) – from the album After the Gold Rush
  - Neil Young – piano, vocal; Danny Whitten – guitar, vocal; Greg Reeves – bass; Ralph Molina – drums, vocal; Stephen Stills – vocal; Bill Peterson – flugelhorn
  - Recorded at Home Studio, Topanga, CA, 3/19/1970. Produced by David Briggs & Neil Young.
9. "When You Dance, I Can Really Love" (3:46) – Neil Young with Crazy Horse – from the album After the Gold Rush – first pressing
  - Neil Young – guitar, vocal; Danny Whitten – guitar, vocal; Jack Nitzsche – piano; Billy Talbot – bass; Ralph Molina – drums
  - Recorded at Home Studio, Topanga, CA, 4/6/1970. Produced by David Briggs & Neil Young.
10. "Ohio" (3:00) – Crosby, Stills, Nash & Young – from the stereo 45 RPM single
  - Neil Young – guitar, vocal; Stephen Stills – guitar, vocal; David Crosby – guitar, vocal; Graham Nash – vocal; Calvin "Fuzzy" Samuels – bass; Johnny Barbata – drums
  - Recorded at The Record Plant, Hollywood, 5/21/1970. Produced by Crosby, Stills, Nash & Young.
11. "Only Love Can Break Your Heart" (4:15) – Crosby, Stills, Nash & Young – previously unreleased live version
  - Neil Young – guitar, vocal; Stephen Stills – double bass; David Crosby – vocal; Graham Nash – vocal
  - Recorded at Fillmore East, New York, NY, 6/5/1970. Produced by Crosby, Stills, Nash & Young.
12. "Tell Me Why" (5:41) – Crosby, Stills, Nash & Young – previously unreleased live version
  - Neil Young – guitar, vocal; Stephen Stills – double bass; David Crosby – vocal; Graham Nash – vocal
  - Recorded at Chicago Auditorium, Chicago, IL, 7/5/1970. Produced by Crosby, Stills, Nash & Young.
13. "Music Is Love" (3:20) – David Crosby, Graham Nash & Neil Young – from the album If I Could Only Remember My Name
  - David Crosby – guitar, vocal; Neil Young – guitar, bass, vibes, vocal; Graham Nash – congas, vocal
  - Recorded at A&M Records Studio C, Hollywood, 8/23/1970. Produced by Graham Nash & Neil Young.
14. "See the Sky About to Rain" (3:56) – previously unreleased live version
  - Neil Young – piano, vocal
  - Recorded at The Cellar Door, Washington, DC, 12/2/1970. Produced by Neil Young & Henry Lewy.
15. "Don't Let It Bring You Down" – from the album After the Gold Rush – second pressing [hidden track]
  - Neil Young – guitar, vocal; Nils Lofgren – piano; Greg Reeves – bass; Ralph Molina – drums
  - Recorded at Home Studio, Topanga, CA, 3/17/1970. Produced by David Briggs & Neil Young.
16. "When You Dance I Can Really Love" – Neil Young with Crazy Horse – from the album After the Gold Rush – second pressing [hidden track]
  - Neil Young – guitar, vocal; Danny Whitten – guitar, vocal; Jack Nitzsche – piano; Billy Talbot – bass; Ralph Molina – drums
  - Recorded at Home Studio, Topanga, CA, 4/6/1970. Produced by David Briggs & Neil Young.
17. "Birds" – from the album After the Gold Rush [hidden track]
  - Neil Young – piano, vocal; Danny Whitten – vocal; Ralph Molina – vocal
  - Recorded at Sound City, Hollywood, CA, 6/30/1970. Produced by David Briggs & Neil Young.

=== Disc 07 – Live at Massey Hall (Toronto 1971) ===
1. "On the Way Home" (3:42)
2. "Tell Me Why" (2:29)
3. "Old Man" (4:57)
4. "Journey Through the Past" (4:15)
5. "Helpless" (4:16)
6. "Love in Mind" (2:47)
7. "A Man Needs a Maid/Heart of Gold (Suite)" (6:39)
8. "Cowgirl in the Sand" (3:45)
9. "Don't Let it Bring You Down" (2:46)
10. "There's a World" (3:33)
11. "Bad Fog of Loneliness" (3:27)
12. "The Needle and the Damage Done" (3:55)
13. "Ohio" (3:40)
14. "See the Sky About to Rain" (4:05)
15. "Down By the River" (4:08)
16. "Dance Dance Dance" (5:48)
17. "I Am a Child" (3:19)
  - Neil Young – guitar, piano, vocal (all tracks)
  - Recorded at Massey Hall, Toronto, ON, 1/19/1971. Produced by David Briggs & Neil Young.

=== Disc 08 – North Country (1971–1972) ===
1. "Heart of Gold" (3:49) – previously unreleased live version
  - Neil Young – guitar, harmonica, vocal
  - Recorded at Royce Hall, UCLA, 1/30/1971. Produced by Henry Lewy & Neil Young.
2. "The Needle and the Damage Done" (2:10) – from the album Harvest
  - Neil Young – guitar, vocal
  - Recorded at Royce Hall, UCLA, 1/30/1971. Produced by Henry Lewy & Neil Young.
3. "Bad Fog of Loneliness" (1:55) – Neil Young with The Stray Gators – previously unreleased version from Harvest sessions
  - Neil Young – guitar, vocal; Ben Keith – pedal steel guitar; Tim Drummond – bass; Kenny Buttrey – drums; Linda Ronstadt – vocal; James Taylor – vocal
  - Recorded at Quadrafonic Sound Studios, Nashville, 2/6/1971. Produced by Elliot Mazer & Neil Young.
4. "Old Man" (3:22) – Neil Young with The Stray Gators – from the album Harvest
  - Neil Young – guitar, vocal; Ben Keith – pedal steel guitar; James McMahon – piano; Tim Drummond – bass; Kenny Buttrey – drums; Linda Ronstadt – vocal; James Taylor – banjo, vocal
  - Recorded at Quadrafonic Sound Studios, Nashville, 2/6/1971. Produced by Elliot Mazer & Neil Young.
5. "Heart of Gold" (3:08) – Neil Young with The Stray Gators – from the album Harvest
  - Neil Young – guitar, harmonica, vocal; Teddy Irwin – guitar; Ben Keith – pedal steel guitar; Tim Drummond – bass; Kenny Buttrey – drums; Linda Ronstadt – vocal; James Taylor – vocal
  - Recorded at Quadrafonic Sound Studios, Nashville, 2/8/1971. Produced by Elliot Mazer & Neil Young.
6. "Dance Dance Dance" (2:14) – Neil Young with Graham Nash – previously unreleased version from Harvest sessions
  - Neil Young – guitar, harmonica, vocal; Graham Nash – banjo, vocal
  - Recorded at Island Studios, London, 2/25/1971. Produced by Neil Young & Graham Nash.
7. "A Man Needs a Maid" (4:10) – Neil Young with the London Symphony Orchestra – previously unreleased mix from Harvest sessions
  - Neil Young – piano, vocal; with the London Symphony Orchestra
  - Recorded at Barking Town Hall, London, 3/1/1971. Produced by Jack Nitzsche.
8. "Harvest" (3:09) – Neil Young with The Stray Gators – from the album Harvest
  - Neil Young – guitar, vocal; Ben Keith – pedal steel guitar; John Harris – piano; Tim Drummond – bass; Kenny Buttrey – drums
  - Recorded at Quadrafonic Sound Studios, Nashville, 4/4/1971. Produced by Elliot Mazer & Neil Young.
9. "Journey Through the Past" (2:21) – Neil Young with The Stray Gators – previously unreleased version from Harvest sessions
  - Neil Young – guitar, harmonica, vocal; Ben Keith – dobro; John Harris – piano; Tim Drummond – bass; Kenny Buttrey – drums
  - Recorded at Quadrafonic Sound Studios, Nashville, 4/4/1971. Produced by Elliot Mazer & Neil Young.
10. "Are You Ready for the Country?" (3:22) – Neil Young with The Stray Gators – from the album Harvest
  - Neil Young – piano, vocal; Ben Keith – pedal steel guitar; Jack Nitzsche – lap steel guitar; Tim Drummond – bass; Kenny Buttrey – drums; David Crosby – vocal; Graham Nash – vocal
  - Recorded at Barn, Broken Arrow Ranch, 9/26/1971. Produced by Elliot Mazer & Neil Young.
11. "Alabama" (4:03) – Neil Young with The Stray Gators – from the album Harvest
  - Neil Young – guitar, vocal; Ben Keith – pedal steel guitar; Jack Nitzsche – piano; Tim Drummond – bass; Kenny Buttrey – drums; David Crosby – vocal; Stephen Stills – vocal
  - Recorded at Barn, Broken Arrow Ranch, 9/26/1971. Produced by Elliot Mazer & Neil Young.
12. "Words (Between the Lines of Age)" (15:52) – Neil Young with The Stray Gators – from the original soundtrack album Journey Through the Past
  - Neil Young – guitar, vocal; Ben Keith – pedal steel guitar; Jack Nitzsche – piano; Tim Drummond – bass; Kenny Buttrey – drums
  - Recorded at Barn, Broken Arrow Ranch, 9/28/1971. Produced by Elliot Mazer & Neil Young.
13. "Soldier" (3:22) – previously unreleased mix from Journey Through the Past sessions
  - Neil Young – piano, vocal
  - Recorded at Sawdust Burner, Kings Mountain, CA, 11/15/1971. Produced by Neil Young and L.A. Johnson.
14. "War Song" (3:29) – Neil Young & Graham Nash with The Stray Gators – from the 45 RPM single (mono)
  - Neil Young – guitar, vocal; Ben Keith – pedal steel guitar; Jack Nitzsche – piano; Tim Drummond – bass; Kenny Buttrey – drums; Graham Nash – vocal
  - Recorded at Broken Arrow Studio, Broken Arrow Ranch, 5/22/1972. Produced by Elliot Mazer, Neil Young, Tim Mulligan & L.A. Johnson.

=== Disc 09 – Journey Through the Past – A Film by Neil Young ===
Special features include the theatrical trailer, radio spots and archival galleries.

=== BD-Live Downloads ===
1. "I Wonder" – The Squires – previously unreleased version (Made available around May 1, 2009) (24-bit/192 kHz audio)
  - Neil Young – guitar, vocal; Doug Campbell – guitar; Ken Koblun – bass; Randy Peterson – drums
  - Recorded at Basement, Winnipeg, MB, 3/8-12/1965. Produced by Neil Young.
2. "Here We Are in the Years" – previously unreleased 2009 remix (Made available around July 26, 2009) (24-bit/192 kHz audio)
  - Neil Young – guitar, piano, organ, harpsichord, vocal; Jim Messina – bass; George Grantham – drums; Also – strings
  - Recorded at TTG Recording Studios, Los Angeles, 10/2/1968. Produced by David Briggs & Neil Young.
3. "Cinnamon Girl" – Neil Young with Crazy Horse – previously unreleased live version (track left off the Fillmore East NYAPS release) (Made available on or very shortly before Sep. 15, 2009) (24-bit/192 kHz audio)
  - Neil Young – guitar, vocals; Danny Whitten – guitar, vocals; Jack Nitzsche – electric piano; Billy Talbot – bass; Ralph Molina – drums, vocals
  - Recorded at Fillmore East, New York City, 3/7/1970. Produced by Paul Rothchild.
4. "Mr. Soul" – Buffalo Springfield – previously unreleased live version (Made available on Oct. 5, 2009) (24-bit/96 kHz audio)
  - Neil Young – guitar, vocals; Stephen Stills – guitar; Richie Furay – guitar; Jim Fielder – bass; Dewey Martin – drums
  - Recorded at Hollywood Bowl, KHJ Appreciation Concert, Hollywood, 4/29/1967. Produced by Buffalo Springfield.
5. "The Rent Is Always Due" – demo from the Buffalo Springfield Box Set (Made available on Nov. 2, 2009) (24-bit/192 kHz audio)
  - Neil Young – guitar, vocals
6. "Shakey Pictures Fanfare" – Jack Nitzsche – opening fanfare for all Shakey Pictures productions, along with instructions for a ringtone download (Made available on Nov. 18, 2009) (24-bit/48 kHz audio)
  - Jack Nitzsche – Composer
7. "It's My Time" – The Mynah Birds – single A-side from The Complete Motown Singles, Vol. 6 (Made available on Feb. 26, 2010) (16-bit/96 kHz audio)
  - Rick Matthews – vocals; Neil Young – guitar, backing vocals; Bruce Palmer – bass; Jim Yachemac – guitar; Rick Mason – drums; The Temptations – backing vocals; The Four Tops – backing vocals
  - Recorded at Hitsville USA, Motown, Detroit, January/February 1966. Produced by R. Dean Taylor, Mike Volvono & Mickey Stevenson.
8. "Go On and Cry" – The Mynah Birds – single B-side from The Complete Motown Singles, Vol. 6 (Made available on Feb. 26, 2010) (16-bit/96 kHz audio)
  - Rick Matthews – vocals; Neil Young – guitar, backing vocals; Bruce Palmer – bass; Jim Yachemac – guitar; Rick Mason – drums; The Temptations – backing vocals; Four Tops|The Four Tops – backing vocals
  - Recorded at Hitsville USA, Motown, Detroit, January/February 1966. Produced by R. Dean Taylor & Mike Volvono.
9. "I Ain't Got the Blues" – previously unreleased song (Made available on Mar. 26, 2010) (24-bit/192 kHz audio)
  - Neil Young – guitar, vocals
  - Recorded at Elektra Audition Demos Records, New York City, 12/15/1965. Produced by Peter K. Siegel & Neil Young.
10. "Mustang" – The Squires – same version as on Disc 00, was used so Young could include text about the song (Made available on Apr. 28, 2010) (24-bit/192 kHz audio)

In the first half of 2016, the BD-Live platform was taken down, and the above content then became inaccessible. Except for the "Shakey Pictures Fanfare," it was added to the Neil Young Archives subscription website on January 21, 2021.

== Production ==
Multimedia

- Bernard Shakey (Neil Young) – direction
- L.A. Johnson – production
- Elliot Rabinowitz – executive production
- Will Mitchell – associate production
- Benjamin Johnson – photography direction
- Toshi Onuki – editing
- Joel Bernstein – archiving
- Rich Winter – authoring
- Ziemowit Darski, Kris Kunz – graphic production
- Sara Wylie Ammerman, Hannah Johnson, Beca Lafore, Ouater Sand – graphic production assistance
- Dave Toms – biography
- Pete Long – tour information
- Marcy Gensic – licensing and clearances
- Mark Faulkner – editing
- Adam Sturgeon, Kevin Graff – production assistance

Audio

- Neil Young – audio tape research
- John Nowland – analog to digital transferring, audio tape research
- Tim Mulligan – editing and mastering
- John Hausmann – assistant engineering, audio tape librarian
- Will Mitchell – audio production assistance
- Harry Sitam – technical engineering
- Jamie Howarth – audio restoration (disc 3)
- Joel Bernstein – audio tape research

Art and text

- Gary Burden, Jenice Heo – art direction and design
- Joel Bernstein – photography, artwork, text, credit researching and compiling
- L.A. Johnson – production
- Will Mitchell – production coordinator
- Jean Camber – image archive assistance
- Elliot Roberts – direction

== Charts ==
Chart (2009)	Peak position
Belgian Albums (Ultratop Flanders)	72
German Albums (Offizielle Top 100)	96
Norwegian Albums (VG-lista)	18
Swedish Albums (Sverigetopplistan)	50
US Billboard 200	102
US Top Rock Albums (Billboard)	37
