= Neil Young (album) =

Studio album by Neil Young
- Released: November 12, 1968
- Recorded: August – October 1968
- Studios: Wally Heider's Studio 3, Hollywood; Sunset Sound, Hollywood; TTG, Hollywood; Sunwest (Los Angeles)
- Genres: Folk rock; country rock
- Length: 35:32
- Label: Reprise
- Producers: Neil Young; David Briggs; Jack Nitzsche; Ry Cooder

Neil Young chronology
Neil Young (1968)	Everybody Knows This Is Nowhere (1969)

Singles from Neil Young
- 1. "The Loner" / "Sugar Mountain" Released: February 21, 1969

Neil Young is the debut studio album by Canadian/American musician Neil Young following his departure from Buffalo Springfield in 1968, issued on Reprise Records, catalogue number RS 6317. The album was first released on November 12, 1968, in the so-called 'CSG mix'. It was then partially remixed and re-released in late summer 1969, but at no time has the album charted on the Billboard 200.

== Background ==
The album is Young's first solo record after releasing three albums with Buffalo Springfield. After their final breakup, Young hired Joni Mitchell's manager Elliot Roberts to also manage his career. Roberts continued to serve as Young's manager until his passing in 2019. Roberts organized Young's first solo tour of coffeehouses and negotiated a record contract for Young with Reprise Records, a division of Warner.

The album also marks Young's first collaboration with record producer David Briggs. Young met Briggs in Topanga Canyon, then a nexus of music talent, while Briggs was living in Stephen Stills' old house. They met one day when Briggs offered Young a ride, and they quickly became friends. David Briggs would go on to produce the vast majority of Young's albums until his death in 1995.

== Songs ==
According to Young in his memoir Waging Heavy Peace, the songs on the album represent a variety of different themes. Some of the songs had been recently written, while others dated back to his time with Buffalo Springfield:

"The songs were gathered from the past and the future, mostly dreams, nothing concrete; they were mostly created as vehicles for record-making, like 'Here We Are in the Years,' or personal expression and longing, such as 'I’ve Been Waiting for You.' Some of them were stream-of-consciousness, like 'The Last Trip to Tulsa,' with no preconceived thought behind them. They were just songs. There was no big pressure on me at that time to top anything I had already done. That came later. The sky was the limit. I had no idea what was coming my way."

"The Emperor of Wyoming" and "String Quartet from Whiskey Boot Hill" are both instrumentals. Young recorded many such instrumentals during his time with Buffalo Springfield. One such instrumental, "Falcon Lake (Ash on the Floor)" would be reworked into "Here We Are in the Years". "String Quartet from Whiskey Boot Hill" is a string quartet performance of an instrumental Young had previously recorded during his time with the band. He would later incorporate the song into the "Country Girl Suite" on CSNY's Déjà Vu. Young would also revisit the melody of "The Emperor of Wyoming" during his mid-1980s country era, recording the song with lyrics as "Leaving the Top 40 Behind". Musicians on "The Emperor of Wyoming" were Neil Young – guitar; Jim Messina – bass; George Grantham – drums; Also – strings. It was Recorded at Wally Heider Recording Studios, Hollywood, on August 23, 1968, with production by David Briggs and Neil Young. "String Quartet from Whiskey Boot Hill" was recorded at Sunset Sound, Hollywood, on October 17, 1968, with an unknown string quartet. It was produced by Jack Nitzsche, Ry Cooder, and Neil Young.

"The Loner" was released as a single. The guitar driven rock song employs D modal tuning, which Young learned alongside Stephen Stills, who used it on "Bluebird". Stills would later cover the song on his 1976 album Illegal Stills. The track's guitar sound presages Young's work on his next album, Everybody Knows This Is Nowhere. Young acknowledges this in a 1973 radio interview: "On my first album, I like "The Loner." I felt like I was getting into something different there, starting to." At the March 7, 1970 Fillmore concert with CSNY, Young remembers reading one early review of the song that wrote "this snappy little item should send Young rising Phoenix-like from the ashes of the Buffalo Springfield," which pleased Young and boosted his confidence in his solo career. The musicians on the track were Neil Young – guitar, pipe organ, vocal; Jim Messina – bass; and George Grantham – drums. It was recorded at TTG Recording Studios, Los Angeles, on September 28, 1968, with production by David Briggs & Neil Young.

"The Old Laughing Lady" is the oldest song on the album, having been written three years prior. Young wrote the song before his time in The Mynah Birds, while playing coffee houses in Michigan, across the border from Ontario. He remembers in Shakey: "I had a series of gigs; maybe Joni and Chuck Mitchell might’ve gotten these gigs in the Detroit/Ann Arbor area: solo acoustic, before the Mynah Birds. Chess Mate coffeehouse, an old folk club in Detroit, Livernois and One-eleventh. Very near there is where the White Tower is. 'The Old Laughing Lady' -- I was having some coffee and wrote it on napkins. I don’t know what prompted it. It came out on a napkin, no guitar. Hangin' out in a coffee shop." He explained further to a concert audience: "We had come out of the Chess Mate Club and found out that someone had left with part of our car and we had to wait for a while in this restaurant. We had to wait for almost a day. It was out of sight. Guys propositioning me at four o'clock in the morning. I wrote it out on a napkin in true folk tradition. Sounds very good. And then I went home and put it in D-modal tuning which was very hip. At the time, everything was in D-modal. You know what D-modal tuning is? You tune the E strings on each end down to D. Leave the other ones where they are. And play as if nothing ever happened. And you get D-modal. Everything sounds different because it's tuned different." Young first recorded the song while a member of Buffalo Springfield, and a demo of the song appears on the 2000 Buffalo Springfield box set. Young would frequently perform the song as part of his solo acoustic sets in subsequent years, notably during his 1976 tours with Crazy Horse, in which he appended an additional short song, "Guilty Train". In April 1976, Young hired Scottish filmmaker Murray Grigor to film video of Young performing the song while busking outside a Glasgow subway station.

"The Old Laughing Lady" was recorded in Hollywood, the same day and with the same musicians and string quartet as on "I've Loved Her So Long" and "String Quartet from Whiskey Boot Hill". It was produced by Jack Nitzsche, Ry Cooder & Neil Young. Musicians were Neil Young – vocal; Ry Cooder – guitar; Jack Nitzsche – electric piano; Carol Kaye – bass; Earl Palmer – drums; Choir: Merry Clayton, Brenda Holloway, Patrice Holloway, Gloria Jones, Sherlie Matthews, and Gracia Nitzsche.

"I've Loved Her So Long", in addition to Young on vocals; Ry Cooder on guitar; Jack Nitzsche on electric piano; Jim Messina on bass; and Earl Palmer on drums; had Merry Clayton, Brenda Holloway, Patrice Holloway, Gloria Jones, Sherlie Matthews, and Gracia Nitzsche on backing choir, and the additional instruments of piano, trumpet, trombone, oboe, clarinet, strings and timpani. It was recorded at Sunwest Recording Studios, Hollywood, on October 7, 1968; and was produced by Jack Nitzsche, Ry Cooder, and Neil Young. The song would be included in setlists during Young's 1969 tour with CSNY, with Graham Nash providing harmony vocals. One such performance appears on the Neil Young Archives website.

"The Last Trip to Tulsa" was recorded at TTG Recording Studios, Los Angeles, on October 1, with production by David Briggs and Neil Young, who accompanies himself on guitar. It is a pot-inspired stream-of-consciousness narrative that Young intended to be humorous. He explains in a 1995 interview: "I always thought there was a funny side to my music. But see, my sense of humor hadn't really been appreciated at that point in my career, it hadn't even been noticed. I mean, 'Last Trip to Tulsa,' that's my idea of a really funny song and that's just one of 'em." Young thought of Tulsa as representative of the southern United States. "Tulsa really represents to me the United States...that feeling of being in the South. The song is sort of an adventure of me down there. The more you listen to it, depending on how much you've been through or what your experiences have been, you can take the verses...any way you want. But the thing is, when I wrote them, they all had a continuity to the way I thought. So I believe that if they had a continuity the way I put them together that they'll fit with any set of images and work all the way through." In an April 1970 Rolling Stone interview, Young expressed regrets about the song: "After the album came out that's the one I really didn't like, you know, and I still don't, but a lot of people really dug that better than anything else on that whole album. See, it's strange. Just because it doesn't happen to be my favorite part, and I know a lot of people really didn't like it, you know, and I can dig why. Because it sounds overdone." Young would later perform the song live with a full electric band in 1973 and release it as a B-side of the "Time Fades Away" single.

== Recording ==
The bulk of the album's songs were recorded at various Los Angeles studios with David Briggs between August and October 1968. Songs "Everybody Knows This Is Nowhere" and "Birds" were also attempted during the sessions. Studios included Wally Heider Studios, TTG Studios and Sunset Sound Recorders. The organ on "I've Been Waiting for You" was recorded at a church in Glendale where Young would also later record organ for "Country Girl" on Déjà Vu.

Young recorded much of the album through overdubbing of individual instruments, a process he has largely rejected since, preferring live performances of all instruments at once. In an April 1970 interview with Elliot Blinder for Rolling Stone, he explains the difficulty of such a record-making method, and his satisfaction with the result in the case of "I've Been Waiting for You":

"All those things were played at different days, every instrument. On that cut, isn't it incredible? You see that's how it can work, every once in a while. Because when I put on the lead guitar I was really into it that day, you know, and all the moods I was in at all the times that I put those things on. See, what I do is, in the beginning, we put down acoustic guitar and bass and drums, that's the smallest track that I ever did, one guitar, bass and drums. And then the acoustic guitar had a bad sound and the bass wasn't playin' the right notes and was a little out of tune, so we did both of these over again; so then we have only one original thing that I'd done before and Jimmy Messina, who played the bass on it, played the bass part over, and then he made up a different bass part so we took off the first one completely and played a whole new one. And then we dropped the acoustic guitar, 'cause it didn't fit with the other things that I put on, so then there was nothing left except for the drums. The pipe organ was put on.... Part of these things were done in different cities. The vocal was done at a different studio. It does stick together though. It's very rare. It'd take you a long time to get a whole album of records like that, it's just not easy to do. I was satisfied with what I'd done, as much as I could be. But then when the mastering job came out on it, it blew my mind, because I couldn't hear what I'd done. But now it's been remastered and you can almost hear it. It was badly mixed."

"The Loner" was the first track produced by Briggs. In the Decade liner notes, Young states that the track features "Jim Messina on bass. George Grantham on drums. I overdubbed the rest except the strings." The string arrangement is by David Blumberg. In the biography Shakey, Briggs states that "the unique guitar tone on both "The Loner" and "I've Been Waiting For You" was achieved by "putting Neil’s guitar through an organ Leslie, not even through an amp, just the Leslie into the board."

David Briggs successfully offered beer to help Young relax while recording the vocal for "The Last Trip to Tulsa." Young explains in Waging Heavy Peace: "Soon Briggs discovered that I needed to drink some beer to do vocals. In those days I didn’t sing live; I overdubbed. I was very unsure of my singing, especially after my previous experiences in the studio with Greene and Stone producing Buffalo Springfield. David Briggs suggested an Oly—Olympia beer was my favorite. It loosened me up quite a bit, and I actually sang a song, “Last Trip to Tulsa,” that was about ten minutes long, without overdubs. Once I got loose and in the groove I was fine, although it still sounded like me. Briggs always said my voice was good. It was unique, and that’s what we needed to make it."

"The Old Laughing Lady" and "I've Loved Her So Long" were recorded with Jack Nitzsche and Ry Cooder at Pat Boone's Sunwest Recording Studios on Sunset Boulevard in late October 1968. It took Young and Nitzsche a month to complete "The Old Laughing Lady." The track employs a vocal muting technique that makes Young's vocal sound "a million miles away but right there" at the same time. In the Decade liner notes, Young recalls recording the track: "Jack Nitzsche & I did this one together. Gracie Nitzsche and the girls can be heard singing. It was a first take overdub vocal for me. Singing in the studio was starting to get easier. It was at this time that Jack told me everything was temporary."

Jack Nitzsche had previously helped Young record the song "Expecting to Fly" for Buffalo Springfield Again. Young would recall his relationship with Nitzsche in a December 1995 interview with Nick Kent for Mojo Magazine:

"Jack taught me a lot: I mean, he'd already worked as an arranger for Spector and had played piano on recording sessions with The Rolling Stones. I met him in a club in Hollywood right when the Springfield first started. We were introduced by Greene and Stone who were our managers then. We just liked each other and always had a great time together. I love listening to all his ideas. Plus I liked 'hanging out' with him because he always got all the new records sent to him every week and he'd sit and listen to them, forming his opinions... He worked as an independent arranger back then. He was a very 'sought-after' guy. When I quit the Springfield, I was living at Jack's house with him, his wife Gracia and his son, 'Little' Jack. 45s would be coming in every week and I remember the day we got the first Jimi Hendrix Experience single - this was way before the first album had been released - and all of us were just awe-struck at how 'raw' the guy sounded. That first album of mine was basically just Jack and me."

Arrangements on "The Old Laughing Lady", "String Quartet from Whiskey Boot Hill" and "I've Loved Her So Long" by Young, Jack Nitzsche and Ry Cooder.

== Release history ==
The first release of the album used the Haeco-CSG encoding system. This technology was intended to make stereo records compatible with mono record players, but had the unfortunate side effect of degrading the sound. Young was unhappy with the first release. "The first mix was awful", he was reported as saying in Cash Box of September 6, 1969. "I was trying to bury my voice, because I didn't like the way it sounded".

The album was therefore partially remixed and re-released without Haeco-CSG processing. Most of the songs from the original album were re-released as-is, only without the Haeco-CSG processing. Only three were remixed, which were replaced on the master tapes: "If I Could Have Her Tonight", "Here We Are in the Years", and "What Did You Do to My Life?". The words "Neil Young" were added to the top of the album cover after what was left of the original stock had been used up, so copies of both mixes exist in the original sleeve. Copies of the original mix on vinyl are now rare and much sought after by Neil Young fans who believe that the remix diminished the songs, especially "Here We Are in the Years". Young has made both mixes available for streaming on his Archives website.

Neil Young was remastered and released on HDCD-encoded compact discs and digital download on July 14, 2009, as part of the Neil Young Archives Original Release Series. It was released on audiophile vinyl in December 2009, both individually and as part of a box-set of Neil's first four LPs available via his official website. This box set was limited to 1000 copies. The remaster was also released on CD, individually and as Disc 1 of a 4-CD box set Official Release Series Discs 1-4, released in the US in 2009 and Europe in 2012. High resolution digital files of both the CSG and non-CSG albums are available to subscribers on the Neil Young Archives website.

== Promotion ==
Young promoted the album through solo acoustic appearances at coffee houses and folk venues in New York, Ann Arbor, Ottawa and Toronto. In late October 1968, he appeared nightly for a full week supporting Joni Mitchell at The Bitter End in Greenwich Village. In November, he played three dates at the Canterbury House in Ann Arbor, Michigan. In late January and early February 1969, he played a week's worth of shows at Le Hibou Coffee House in Ottawa followed by a week at the Riverboat Coffee House in Toronto. Young would memorialize this time in the lyrics of "Ambulance Blues" on On the Beach. Compilations of his performances at the Canterbury House and the Riverboat would be released as Sugar Mountain – Live at Canterbury House 1968 in 2008 and Live at the Riverboat 1969 in 2009, respectively, as part of his Archives series.

In February 1969, Young would begin touring with Crazy Horse, with whom he began recording his follow up album, Everybody Knows This Is Nowhere in January.

"The Loner" was released as a single, with the non-album track "Sugar Mountain" as the B-side. "Sugar Mountain" was recorded live at the Canterbury House.

== Reception ==
Professional ratings
Review scores
Source	Rating
AllMusic	3.5/5 stars
Pitchfork	7.8/10
Rolling Stone	favorable

Reviews were mostly positive. At the time of the album's release, Cashbox magazine stated that Young "creates an aura of gentle beauty." Rolling Stone wrote "in many ways, a delightful reprise of that Springfield sound done a new way". In its retrospective review, AllMusic described it as "an uneven, low-key introduction to Young's solo career".

== Track listing ==
All songs written by Neil Young, except "String Quartet from Whiskey Boot Hill", written by Jack Nitzsche.

Side one
No.	Title	Length
1.	"The Emperor of Wyoming"	2:14
2.	"The Loner"	3:55
3.	"If I Could Have Her Tonight"	2:15
4.	"I've Been Waiting for You"	2:30
5.	"The Old Laughing Lady"	5:05

Side two
No.	Title	Length
6.	"String Quartet From Whiskey Boot Hill"	1:04
7.	"Here We Are in the Years"	3:27
8.	"What Did You Do to My Life?"	2:00
9.	"I've Loved Her So Long"	2:40
10.	"The Last Trip to Tulsa"	9:25

Track timings are from the original 1969 vinyl release, catalogue number RS 6317.

== Personnel ==
- Neil Young – vocals, guitars, piano, synthesizer, harpsichord, pipe organ, production
- Ry Cooder – guitar, production
- Jack Nitzsche – electric piano, arrangements, production
- Jim Messina, Carol Kaye – bass
- George Grantham, Earl Palmer – drums
- Merry Clayton, Brenda Holloway, Patrice Holloway, Gloria Richetta Jones, Sherlie Matthews, Gracia Nitzsche – backing vocals
- Unidentified – trumpet, trombone, tenor saxophone, French horn, clarinet, timpani, strings

Production

- David Briggs – production
- Dale Batchelor, Donn Landee, Mark Richardson, Henry Saskowski – engineering
- Rik Pekkonen – arrangements, engineering
- Danny Kelly – photography
- Ed Thrasher – album art direction
- Roland Diehl – cover painting

== Charts ==
Chart performance for Neil Young
Chart (1968)	Peak position
Japanese Album Charts	82
