= Living with War: "In the Beginning" =

Remix album by Neil Young
- Released: November 7, 2006
- Recorded: March 29 – April 2, 2006
- Studio: Redwood Digital
- Genre: Rock
- Length: 38:58
- Label: Reprise
- Producer: Neil Young; Niko Bolas; L.A. Johnson

Neil Young chronology
Live at the Fillmore East (2006)	Living with War: "In the Beginning" (2006)	Live at Massey Hall 1971 (2007)

Professional ratings
Review scores
Source	Rating
AllMusic	3.5/5 stars

Living with War: "In the Beginning" is a remix album by Neil Young, first released on iTunes on November 7, 2006. It is a stripped-down version of Young's 2006 album Living with War. The original title of this particular CD/DVD release, according to a press release, was called Living with War – Raw. However, the title changed when the album was finally released.

The album includes first mixes of the live trio recordings, made the day of recording, and was made available via digital download on iTunes on Election Day, November 7, 2006. Also available on iTunes that day were four videos directed by Neil Young of songs from the album: "After the Garden", "Families", "Lookin' for a Leader" and "America the Beautiful".

In a special CD/DVD limited-edition package, available on Reprise Records in stores on December 19, 2006, the set included videos directed by Young of every song on the album. The videos used a wide range of visual sources, both from the Iraq War as well as demonstrations in the United States, and Al Gore's film An Inconvenient Truth.

On the "Raw" version of the album, the sound is straight-from-the-source, captured live in the studio exactly the way it was recorded, without the backing instrumentation and choral accompaniment found on the original release.

== Track listing ==
All songs written by Neil Young, and © 2006, Silver Fiddle Music.

No.	Title	Length
1.	"After the Garden"	3:27
2.	"Living with War"	5:10
3.	"The Restless Consumer"	5:52
4.	"Shock and Awe"	4:58
5.	"Families"	2:34
6.	"Flags of Freedom"	3:48
7.	"Let's Impeach the President"	4:33
8.	"Lookin' for a Leader"	4:10
9.	"Roger and Out"	4:25

== Personnel ==
- Neil Young – guitars, vocal
- Rick Rosas – bass
- Chad Cromwell – drums
- Tom Bray – trumpet

Additional roles

- Niko Bolas – producer, mixing
- L. A. Johnson – assistant producer
- John Hausmann – engineering
- Tim Mulligan – mastering
- Will Mitchell – digital soundbytes ("Let's Impeach the President")
- Darrell Brown – choir conduction

DVD production

- Bernard Shakey (Neil Young) – direction, video headlines and news tickers
- L.A. Johnson – production
- Elliot Rabinowitz – executive production
- Will Mitchell – associate production, video headlines and news tickers
- Toshi Onuki – editing (songs and documentary), art direction
- Mark Faulkner – editing (documentary)
- Treena Loria – online editing
- Ziemowit "Jim" Darksi – assistant editing, graphic production
- Steven Gregory – animation
- Rich Winter – authoring, art direction
- Phil Denslow – graphic art direction
- Marcy Gensic, Adam Sturgeon – production assistance
