= Live at the Cellar Door =

Live album by Neil Young
- Released: December 10, 2013
- Recorded: November 30 – December 2, 1970
- Venue: The Cellar Door, Washington, D.C.
- Genre: Rock; folk rock
- Length: 45:06
- Label: Reprise
- Producer: Neil Young; Henry Lewy

Neil Young chronology
Psychedelic Pill (2012)	Live at the Cellar Door (2013)	A Letter Home (2014)

Archives Performance Series chronology
PS02: Live at the Fillmore East (2006)	PS02.5: Live at the Cellar Door (2013)	PS03: Live at Massey Hall 1971 (2007)

Professional ratings
Aggregate scores
Source	Rating
Metacritic	84/100
Review scores
Source	Rating
AllMusic	4/5 stars
Consequence of Sound	4.5/5 stars
Drowned in Sound	9/10
The Observer	4/5 stars
Pitchfork	7.7/10
Rolling Stone	4/5 stars
Tom Hull	B+

Live at the Cellar Door is a live album by Neil Young, featuring performances from his six 1970 concerts in Washington D.C. It was released on December 10, 2013. The album is volume 02.5 in Young's Archives Performance Series. The album features songs from both Young's early albums and Buffalo Springfield albums, including After the Gold Rush, Harvest, Everybody Knows This Is Nowhere, On the Beach, Buffalo Springfield and Buffalo Springfield Again.

Additionally, the album features the only known recording of Young performing his song "Cinnamon Girl" on piano. As stated by his comment on the disc "That's the first time I've ever performed that song on piano!"

The album closes with "Flying on the Ground is Wrong" in which Young quips: "I had it put in my contracts that I would only play on a nine-foot Steinway grand piano, just for a little eccentricity."

== Track listing ==
No.	Title	Length
1.	"Tell Me Why"	2:52
2.	"Only Love Can Break Your Heart"	3:13
3.	"After the Gold Rush"	3:48
4.	"Expecting to Fly"	3:21
5.	"Bad Fog of Loneliness"	2:00
6.	"Old Man"	3:41
7.	"Birds"	2:19
8.	"Don't Let It Bring You Down"	2:38
9.	"See the Sky About to Rain"	3:21
10.	"Cinnamon Girl"	3:29
11.	"I Am a Child"	2:43
12.	"Down by the River"	4:24
13.	"Flying on the Ground Is Wrong"	7:11

== Personnel ==
- Neil Young – vocal (all), acoustic guitar (1–2, 5–6, 8, 11–12), piano (3–4, 7, 9–10, 13), production

Additional roles

- Henry Lewy – production
- Gary Burden – art direction and design, inside photography
- Jenice Heo – art direction and design
- George Mason – cover photography
- John Nowland – mixing, analog to digital transferring
- Tim Mulligan – mixing, mastering

== Charts ==
Chart (2014)	Peak Position
Austrian Albums (Ö3 Austria)	61
Belgian Albums (Ultratop Flanders)	61
Belgian Albums (Ultratop Wallonia)	156
Dutch Albums (Album Top 100)	35
French Albums (SNEP)	120
German Albums (Offizielle Top 100)	45
Hungarian Albums (MAHASZ)	23
Swedish Albums (Sverigetopplistan)	38
Swiss Albums (Schweizer Hitparade)	77
US Billboard 200	28
US Americana/Folk Albums (Billboard)	1
US Top Rock Albums (Billboard)	3
US Top Current Album Sales (Billboard)	26
US Vinyl Albums (Billboard)	2
US Indie Store Album Sales (Billboard)	1

=== Year-end charts ===
Chart (2014)	Position
US Folk Albums (Billboard)	14
US Top Rock Albums (Billboard)	75
