= Live at the Riverboat 1969 =

Live album by Neil Young
- Released: June 2, 2009
- Recorded: February 7–9, 1969
- Venue: The Riverboat, Toronto, Canada
- Genre: Folk rock
- Length: 56:45
- Label: Reprise
- Producer: Neil Young

Neil Young chronology
Fork in the Road (2009)	Live at the Riverboat 1969 (2009)	The Archives Vol. 1 1963–1972 (2009)

Archives Performance Series chronology
PS00: Sugar Mountain – Live at Canterbury House 1968 (2008)	PS01: Live at the Riverboat 1969 (2009)	PS02: Live at the Fillmore East (2006)

Live at the Riverboat 1969 is a live album by Neil Young, released in 2009. In February 1969, Young performed a series of shows at the Riverboat coffee house in Toronto. This album is a live recording from these performances.

This album is Volume 1 in the Archives Performance Series.

A CD sampler of the album was released in selected retail outlets alongside Young's 2007 album, Chrome Dreams II. The different outlets had different bonus CDs with a different preview track.

The album has never been given a standalone release and was only included as part of the Neil Young Archives Vol. 1: 1963–1972 box set.

== Track listing ==
All songs written by Neil Young.

No.	Title	Length
1.	"Emcee Intro / Sugar Mountain Intro"	1:10
2.	"Sugar Mountain"	5:34
3.	"Incredible Doctor Rap"	3:10
4.	"The Old Laughing Lady"	5:14
5.	"Audience Observation / Dope Song / Band Names Rap"	2:59
6.	"Flying on the Ground Is Wrong"	3:58
7.	"On the Way Home Intro"	0:25
8.	"On the Way Home"	2:40
9.	"Set Break / Emcee Intro"	1:20
10.	"I've Loved Her So Long"	2:13
11.	"Allen A-Dale Rap"	2:20
12.	"I Am a Child"	2:27
13.	"1956 Bubblegum Disaster"	2:04
14.	"The Last Trip to Tulsa"	7:00
15.	"Words Rap"	2:14
16.	"Broken Arrow"	4:38
17.	"Turn Down the Lights Rap"	0:53
18.	"Whiskey Boot Hill"	2:22
19.	"Expecting to Fly Intro"	0:54
20.	"Expecting to Fly"	2:55

== Personnel ==
- Neil Young – guitar, vocals, production
