= Double drop D tuning =

Guitar tuning

Double drop D tuning: DADGBD, also known simply as double drop D, is an alternative guitar tuning: both E strings are tuned down ("dropped") one whole step (2 frets) to D rather than E as in standard tuning (EADGBE).

== Uses of double dropped D tuning ==
The main use for double dropped D is so that guitarists can play intervals of a fifth with one finger on the bass strings, and play the treble side of a barre chord. Some recordings that make effective use of this tuning are "Black Water" by The Doobie Brothers, "The Loner," "Cortez the Killer," "Don't Let It Bring You Down," "Ohio" and "Cinnamon Girl" by Neil Young, "Choctaw Bingo" and "We Can't Make It Here" by James McMurtry, "Find the Cost of Freedom" by Crosby, Stills, Nash, and Young, "Going to California" by Led Zeppelin, "The End" by The Doors, "Devils & Dust" by Bruce Springsteen, "Satellite" by Elliott Smith, "Overkill" by Men At Work, "Bryter Layter" by Nick Drake, "The Best Ever Death Metal Band In Denton" by The Mountain Goats, and "Nobody's Fault but My Own" by Beck.

America used a variation for "A Horse with No Name", in which the fifth string, normally an A, is also dropped. The string order for this variation, from low to high, is DEDGBD.

English folk singer Kate Rusby primarily uses this tuning for playing in the key of G, capoing in order to play in other keys.

== Examples of chords in dropped D tuning ==
Chords in double dropped D tuning are formed as they are in standard tuning, with the exception of the first and sixth strings, which are either omitted or fretted one whole step higher:

Chord	Tab
A	x02222
Am	x02212
B	x24444
Bm	x24434
C	x32012
D	000234
Dm	000233
E	222102
Em	222002
F	x03213
F♯	xx4324
F♯m	xx4224
G	020000

Note that these chords are not the power chords commonly played in double drop D tuning. Power chords generally mute the higher notes rather than the lower notes:

For purposes of making the table easier to read, spacing is provided between each number when the fret number becomes a double digit.

Chord	Tabs	
A5	777xxx	x022xx
Bb5	888xxx	x133xx
B5	999xxx	x244xx
C5	10 10 10xxx	x355xx
C♯5	11 11 11xxx	x466xx
D5	000xxx	x577xx
Eb5	111xxx	x688xx
E5	222xxx	x799xx
F5	333xxx	x8 10 10xx
F♯5	444xxx	x9 11 11xx
G5	555xxx	x10 12 12xx
G♯5	666xxx	x11 13 13xx

Some examples of the simplified barre chords are shown below. Chords involving the minor third may be more difficult to fret.

Chord	Tab
A	xx2222
B	x24444
C	xx5555
D	000234
E	xx9999
F	xx10,10,10,10
F♯	xx11,11,11,11
G	xx12,12,12,12
