= Sugar Mountain – Live at Canterbury House 1968 =

Live album by Neil Young
- Released: December 2, 2008
- Recorded: November 9 – 10, 1968
- Venues: Canterbury House, Ann Arbor
- Genres: Folk rock; country rock
- Length: 70:15
- Label: Reprise
- Producer: Neil Young

Neil Young chronology
Chrome Dreams II (2007)	Sugar Mountain – Live at Canterbury House 1968 (2008)	Fork in the Road (2009)

Archives Performance Series chronology
PS00: Sugar Mountain – Live at Canterbury House 1968 (2008)	PS01: Live at the Riverboat 1969 (2009)

Professional ratings
Aggregate scores
Source	Rating
Metacritic	84/100
Review scores
Source	Rating
AllMusic	4.5/5 stars
Entertainment Weekly	B+
The Guardian	4/5 stars
musicOMH	4/5 stars
Now	4/5 stars
Paste	9/10
Pitchfork	8.0/10
Rolling Stone	4/5 stars
Spin	3.5/5 stars
Uncut	5/5 stars

Sugar Mountain – Live at Canterbury House 1968 is a live album by Canadian-American musician Neil Young. On November 8–10, 1968, Young performed three solo acoustic shows at Canterbury House in Ann Arbor, Michigan. The album is compiled from the performances on the 9th and 10th.

== Recording ==
The recording of the song "Sugar Mountain" from this appearance was previously released as a single B-side and on Young's 1977 compilation album Decade.

== Release ==
This album is Volume 00 in the Archives Performance Series. Since volumes two and three had already been released, this album, though performed earlier chronologically, is the third release from the Series. The Riverboat 1969, released in The Archives Vol. 1 1963–1972 in 2009, is the fourth Archive Performance Series released but was performed earlier chronologically than volumes two and three.

The album was released only as a CD/DVD set, with the DVD containing a high-definition audio version of the album, playable on standard DVD players. The DVD also contains a trailer for Young's Archives Vol. 1 box set.

A vinyl record version of the album, pressed on 200-gram Japanese vinyl, was released in April 2009.

The album's cover is a photograph of Young taken in 1967 by Linda Eastman, later the wife of Paul McCartney.

== Track listing ==
All compositions written by Neil Young except where indicated.

Disc 1 (CD)

1. Emcee intro – 0:45
2. "On the Way Home" – 2:52
3. Songwriting Rap – 3:13
4. "Mr. Soul" – 3:14
5. Recording Rap – 0:30
6. "Expecting to Fly" – 2:49
7. "The Last Trip to Tulsa" – 8:36
8. Bookstore Rap – 4:27
9. "The Loner" – 4:41
10. "I Used to..." Rap – 0:38
11. "Birds – 2:17
12. "Winterlong" (excerpt) and "Out of My Mind" Intro – 1:38
13. "Out of My Mind" – 2:07
14. "If I Could Have Her Tonight" – 2:34
15. Classical Gas Rap (Mason Williams/Young) – 0:41
16. "Sugar Mountain" Intro – 0:29
17. "Sugar Mountain" – 5:47
18. "I've Been Waiting for You" – 2:04
19. Songs rap – 0:38
20. "Nowadays Clancy Can't Even Sing" – 4:43
21. Tuning Rap and "The Old Laughing Lady" Intro – 3:06
22. "The Old Laughing Lady" – 7:26
23. "Broken Arrow" – 5:09

=== Bonus tracks ===
1. "I Am a Child" (iTunes-only bonus track) –
2. "#1 Hit Record Rap" (hidden MP3 bonus track) –

Disc 2 (DVD-Audio)

1. Emcee intro – 0:45
2. "On the Way Home" – 2:52
3. Songwriting Rap – 3:13
4. "Mr. Soul" – 3:14
5. Recording Rap – 0:30
6. "Expecting to Fly" – 2:49
7. "The Last Trip to Tulsa" – 8:36
8. Bookstore Rap – 4:27
9. "The Loner" – 4:41
10. "I Used to..." Rap – 0:38
11. "Birds – 2:17
12. "Winterlong" (excerpt) and "Out of My Mind" Intro – 1:38
13. "Out of My Mind" – 2:07
14. "If I Could Have Her Tonight" – 2:34
15. Classical Gas Rap (Williams/Young) – 0:41
16. "Sugar Mountain" Intro – 0:29
17. "Sugar Mountain" – 5:47
18. "I've Been Waiting for You" – 2:04
19. Songs rap – 0:38
20. "Nowadays Clancy Can't Even Sing" – 4:43
21. Tuning Rap and "The Old Laughing Lady" Intro – 3:06
22. "The Old Laughing Lady" – 7:26
23. "Broken Arrow" – 5:09

== Personnel ==
- Neil Young – guitar, vocals, production

Additional roles

- Joel Bernstein – archiving
- John Nowland – analog to digital transferring
- Tim Mulligan – editing and mastering
- John Hausmann – assistant engineering
- Harry Sitam – engineering
- Linda McCartney – cover photograph

DVD production

- Bernard Shakey (Neil Young) – direction
- L.A. Johnson – production
- Elliot Rabinowitz – executive production
- Toshi Onuki – art direction
- Will Mitchell – production coordination

== Charts ==
Chart performance for Sugar Mountain – Live at Canterbury House 1968
Chart (2009)	Peak position
Australian Albums (ARIA)	93
Belgian Albums (Ultratop Flanders)	57
Dutch Albums (Album Top 100)	59
French Albums (SNEP)	124
Italian Albums (FIMI)	72
Norwegian Albums (VG-lista)	30
Swedish Albums (Sverigetopplistan)	47
UK Albums (Official Charts)	72
US Billboard 200	40
US Top Rock Albums (Billboard)	10
US Indie Store Album Sales (Billboard)	2
