= Living with War =

Studio album by Neil Young
- Released: May 2, 2006
- Recorded: March 29 – April 6, 2006
- Studios: Redwood Digital; Capitol Studios
- Genre: Folk rock
- Length: 41:49
- Label: Reprise
- Producers: Neil Young; Niko Bolas; L.A. Johnson

Neil Young chronology
| Prairie Wind (2005) | Living with War (2006) | Live at the Fillmore East (2006) |

Singles from Living with War
- 1. "Let's Impeach the President" Released: April 28, 2006

Living with War is the twenty-ninth studio album by Canadian-American musician Neil Young, released on May 2, 2006. The album's lyrics, titles, and conceptual style are highly critical of the policies of the George W. Bush administration; the CTV website described it as "a musical critique of U.S. President George W. Bush and his conduct of the war in Iraq". The record was written and recorded over nine days in March and April 2006.

Living with War was nominated for a Grammy and Juno Award.

== Writing ==
Young began writing songs for Living with War in a Gambier, Ohio, hotel room while visiting his daughter at her college. While retrieving coffee from a vending machine early one morning, Young saw the front page of a USA Today issue documenting a surgery room on an airplane flying seriously wounded US soldiers from Iraq to Germany. He later told Charlie Rose that the combination of the vivid picture and the headline (which focused not on any suffering and death depicted, but rather on medical breakthroughs made during the war) moved him: "For some reason, that was what did it to me. I went upstairs after that. I wrote this song, 'Families'; I started writing another song, 'Restless Consumer'; I started writing all these songs all at once; I had like four songs going at once." Young has said that after writing the songs, he quickly began "coming apart." He called his wife Pegi back to their room, and "I held on to her, and I was sobbing. I was sobbing so hard, that things were coming out of my face."

The lyrics of "Living With War" are in line with the early 1960s albums of folk artists such as Phil Ochs and Bob Dylan, although they are set to what Young calls "metal folk protest music". Time Out London similarly proclaimed the record to be an "anti-Bush folk-metal tirade". Young was inspired to write an album critical of American policy due to a lack of other, younger artists doing the same: "I was hoping some young person would come along and say this and sing some songs about it, but I didn't see anybody, so I'm doing it myself. I waited as long as I could." In a New York Times interview, he compares the album's style to that of broadsides, an older style of protest music: "They had these songs that everybody knew the melodies to. They'd just write new words, and the minstrels would be traveling around spreading the word. Music spreads like wildfire when you do it that way."

The rush release and the political nature of the tracks are also comparable to Young's 1970 song "Ohio". In a May 2007 interview with Rolling Stone's David Fricke, Young rejects the comparison:

"When I wrote "Let's Impeach the President," a lot of people criticized it as a crappy song, that it was such a terrible melody. What am I going to do, write a song like that and use a good melody? That doesn't make sense. You want a melody that pisses people off, that's so stupid and repetitive that it aggravates people. 'Ohio' is about kids getting killed. It's about people you cared about personally, your own brother and sister. That's when you put everything you have, poetic, musical, performance-wise, at your command. Because you believe in it so much. "Let's Impeach the President" is a political song about something that's so wrong that the only way to point out how wrong it is by doing a song that's wrong: smashing and pounding away at it. It was very successful in that respect."

== Recording ==
The rhythm section of Rick Rosas and Chad Cromwell, and Young's "Volume Dealers" co-producer Niko Bolas were also at the core of Young's 1989 album Freedom, which contained an angry criticism of Reagan-George H. W. Bush America. There are other links between the albums: Bray also performed on Freedom and Freedom's hit single "Rockin' in the Free World" also contained a quotation of a President Bush: "a thousand points of light".

The sessions were recorded on 16-track analog tape and mixed to a half-inch analog two-track master, then transferred to high-resolution digital media for CD and DVD manufacturing. The vinyl pressing was on 200 g discs.

In November 2006, Young released a stripped-down version of the album, Living with War: "In the Beginning", without the backing instrumentation and choral accompaniment found on the original release.

== Promotion ==
On April 28, 2006, the album was given a pre-release premiere in its entirety on the Los Angeles radio station KLOS (95.5) by Jim Ladd. The album was released onto the Internet on May 2, 2006, before entering retail in May 2006. Young has expressed that his intent is that the work be considered as a whole, and the streaming-audio internet release was the whole album, rather than individually selectable songs.

That first impression is so important" ... "Instead of just going to "Let's Impeach the President", people will have to absorb the whole thing. To understand the songs, you need to understand where the whole album's coming from. It protects my right as an artist to have the work presented the way I created it.

— Neil Young

The albums songs were performed live on Crosby, Stills, Nash & Young’s 2006 Freedom Of Speech Tour. Selections from that tour can be heard on the album Déjà Vu Live, released in 2008.

== Reception ==
Professional ratings
Aggregate scores
| Source | Rating |
|---|---|
| Metacritic | 77/100 |
Review scores
| Source | Rating |
| AllMusic | 3.5/5 stars |
| Entertainment Weekly | B+ |
| The Guardian | 4/5 stars |
| The Irish Times | 4/5 stars |
| Los Angeles Times | 4/4 stars |
| Pitchfork | 7.6/10 |
| Q | 4/5 stars |
| Rolling Stone | 4/5 stars |
| Uncut | 8/10 |
| The Village Voice | B+ |

Reviewing the album for Mojo magazine, Sylvie Simmons described the songs as "Urgent, instant, bolshie mostly, with a stronger individual melodic sense than, say, Greendale, but without the intense beauty of, say, Ohio … though definitely an improvement on Let's Roll". Living with War was nominated for three 2007 Grammy Awards in the categories of Best Rock Album, Best Rock Song and Best Solo Rock Vocal Performance (both for "Lookin' for a Leader").

Despite the album's content and criticism from right wing blogs leading up to the release, Young stated that he considers the album nonpartisan. He said in an interview with The New York Times: "If you impeach Bush, you're doing a huge favor for the Republicans … They can run again with some pride."

== Track listing ==
All tracks are written by Neil Young, except where noted.

| No. | Title | Writer(s) | Length |
|---|---|---|---|
| 1. | "After the Garden" | | 3:23 |
| 2. | "Living with War" | | 5:04 |
| 3. | "The Restless Consumer" | | 5:47 |
| 4. | "Shock and Awe" | | 4:53 |
| 5. | "Families" | | 2:25 |
| 6. | "Flags of Freedom" | | 3:42 |
| 7. | "Let's Impeach the President" | | 5:10 |
| 8. | "Lookin' for a Leader" | | 4:03 |
| 9. | "Roger and Out" | | 4:25 |
| 10. | "America the Beautiful" | Katharine Lee Bates, Samuel Augustus Ward | 2:57 |

== Personnel ==
- Neil Young – guitars, harmonica, vocal, producer, vocal and choir arrangements
- Rick Rosas – bass
- Chad Cromwell – drums
- Tommy Bray – trumpet
- Darrell Brown – choir leader, conductor, contractor, vocal and choir arrangements
- Rosemary Butler – choir conductor, contractor
- 100 voices: choir (featuring Darlene Koldenhoven) recorded in one 12-hour session at Capitol recording studios in Los Angeles.
- Gary Stockdale – choir background vocals
- Michael Mishaw – choir background vocals

=== Production ===
- Niko Bolas – producer
- L. A. Johnson – co-producer
- Mix-down at Redwood Digital with Niko Bolas and second engineer John Hausman
- Mastering by Tim Mulligan at Redwood Digital
- Digital soundbites – Will Mitchell on "Let's Impeach the President"

== Charts ==
| Chart (2006) | Peak position |
|---|---|
| Australian Albums (ARIA) | 41 |
| Austrian Albums (Ö3 Austria) | 27 |
| Belgian Albums (Ultratop Flanders) | 14 |
| Belgian Albums (Ultratop Wallonia) | 39 |
| Canadian Albums (Billboard) | 7 |
| Danish Albums (Hitlisten) | 18 |
| Dutch Albums (Album Top 100) | 24 |
| Finnish Albums (Suomen virallinen lista) | 18 |
| French Albums (SNEP) | 92 |
| German Albums (Offizielle Top 100) | 13 |
| Irish Albums (IRMA) | 24 |
| Italian Albums (FIMI) | 28 |
| New Zealand Albums (RMNZ) | 31 |
| Norwegian Albums (VG-lista) | 4 |
| Spanish Albums (Promusicae) | 37 |
| Swedish Albums (Sverigetopplistan) | 11 |
| Swiss Albums (Schweizer Hitparade) | 48 |
| UK Albums (Official Charts) | 14 |
| US Billboard 200 | 15 |
| US Top Rock Albums (Billboard) | 7 |
| US Indie Store Album Sales (Billboard) | 3 |
