= Bad Fog of Loneliness =

Song by Neil Young

from the album Live at Massey Hall 1971
- Released: March 13, 2007
- Recorded: January 19, 1971
- Venue: Massey Hall, Toronto, Ontario, Canada
- Genre: Folk rock
- Length: 3:27
- Label: Reprise
- Songwriter: Neil Young
- Producers: David Briggs; Neil Young

"Bad Fog of Loneliness" is a song written by Canadian singer-songwriter Neil Young, recorded in 1971 but not released until 2007 on the album Live at Massey Hall 1971 (which was later a disc on The Archives Vol. 1 1963–1972), as a studio outtakes on both 2009's The Archives Vol. 1 1963–1972 and again on 2020's The Archives Vol. II (1972 - 1976), as well as from a 1970 live recording on 2013's Live at the Cellar Door. It also appeared on Young's live "Red Rocks" DVD released in 2000.

In the introduction to the Live at Massey Hall version, Young explains that he originally intended to perform the song on the Johnny Cash Show but his appearance was canceled. By the time he was rescheduled to appear in February 1971, he decided that the song was "too old" and would perform something else instead (he eventually did two other brand new songs, "The Needle and the Damage Done" and "Journey Through the Past").

A studio version of the song also appears on The Archives Vol. 1, featuring Ben Keith on pedal steel guitar, Tim Drummond on bass guitar, Kenny Buttrey on drums, and Linda Ronstadt and James Taylor on background vocals. This version of the song was recorded as part of the Harvest sessions on February 6–7, 1971.

"Bad Fog of Loneliness" has much in common with much of what Young was writing at the time. The riff in the introduction is reminiscent of that of "The Needle and the Damage Done", and the change from 4/4 to 3/4 time in the bridge is similar to "Words (Between the Lines of Age)".

== Personnel ==
- Neil Young – guitar, vocals
