= Country Girl (Crosby, Stills, Nash & Young song) =

Crosby, Stills, Nash and Young song written by Neil Young

Song by Crosby, Stills, Nash & Young

from the album Déjà Vu
- Released: March 11, 1970
- Recorded: November 5, 1969
- Studio: Wally Heider Recording Studios
- Genre: Rock
- Length: 5:11
- Label: Atlantic
- Songwriter: Neil Young
- Producers: Crosby, Stills, Nash & Young

"Country Girl" is a song written by Neil Young that was first released on Crosby, Stills, Nash & Young's 1970 album Déjà Vu.

== Lyrics and music ==
"Country Girl" is made up of three distinct song segments. The first section, "Whisky Boot Hill," was based on a song that Young had originally started working on in 1967 and had released a string quartet arrangement of on his solo debut album Neil Young. The second section, "Down Down Down," was from a song that Young had recorded with Buffalo Springfield which had not yet been released. It was eventually released on the Buffalo Springfield box set in 2001. The final section was entitled "Country Girl (I Think You're Pretty)."

Music lecturer Ken Bielen finds the lyrics to be rather obscure, but notes that the song seems to be set in a bar and the subject of the song seems to be a waitress. Bielen notes that a common Young theme of "fascination with the culture of celebrity" seems to be reflected in lyrics where "stars sit in bars." Allmusic critic Richie Unterberger also finds the lyrics to be enigmatic and difficult to understand. Unterberger does find the first two parts to contain "evocative images that seem suffused with nostalgic lament and regret." He finds the last part to be a "romantic plea for the girl to let him be her country man."

Unterberger describes the song as "an achingly pretty, brooding minor-key ballad." The "Whiskey Boot Hill" section opens with a prominent piano part which persists throughout the section and which Unterberger describes as "doomy" and "classical-tinged." The "Down Down Down" section is more uplifting and contains the harmonies of David Crosby's, Stephen Stills' and Graham Nash's backing vocals. According to Unterberger, "the orchestral density of the arrangement really explodes when it reaches the third and final part...as if sunlight has suddenly emerged over the hill to brighten Young's heart." Bielen describes this as breaking the tension, with Young using a "loud, yearning voice" on his vocal.

== Personnel ==
- Neil Young – lead & harmony vocals, acoustic rhythm guitar, organ, pipe organ, harmonica, vibraphone
- David Crosby – harmony vocals, acoustic rhythm guitar
- Stephen Stills – harmony vocals, acoustic rhythm guitar, piano
- Graham Nash – harmony vocals, acoustic rhythm guitar

=== Additional personnel ===
- Greg Reeves – bass guitar
- Dallas Taylor – drums

== Production and recording ==
The production uses a "wall of sound" approach reminiscent of Phil Spector. Bielen compares the feel of the production to that of the Buffalo Springfield songs "Expecting to Fly" and "Broken Arrow." The recording was mostly live with the main exception being the backing vocals which were overlaid later. According to Young biographer David Downing, while recording the song Young told CSN&Y bassist Greg Reeves that "what we've got to do is listen with an eye to simplicity. Think how we can make it bigger by simplifying it."

== Reception ==
Music critic Johnny Rogan described "Country Girl" as "magnificent," stating that "this represented the scale of Young's artistic ambition as a member of CSN&Y." Rogan also praised David Crosby's, Stephen Stills' and Graham Nash's backing vocals as well as the Phil Spector-esque "grandiose production." According to the authors of Uncut, Crosby's, Stills' and Nash's backing gave the song a "bucolic grandeur." Music journalist Nigel Williamson also praises the background vocals, stating that in the song Young is "totally integrated into the CSN&Y sound for once" and that the sweetness of Crosby's, Stills' and Nash's vocals perfectly complement Young's "rawer style." Rolling Stone Album Guide contributor Paul Evans describes the song as a "gorgeous three-song suite." On the other hand, Downing finds the production to be cluttered like a Phil Spector production but lacking in grandeur, except for one moment when Nash's backing vocal "soars out past Mars." Young considered the song to be "overblown." Neil Young FAQ author Glen Boyd lamented the exclusion of "Country Girl" from Young's 1977 compilation album Decade.
