= Sugar Mountain (song) =

1965 song by Neil Young

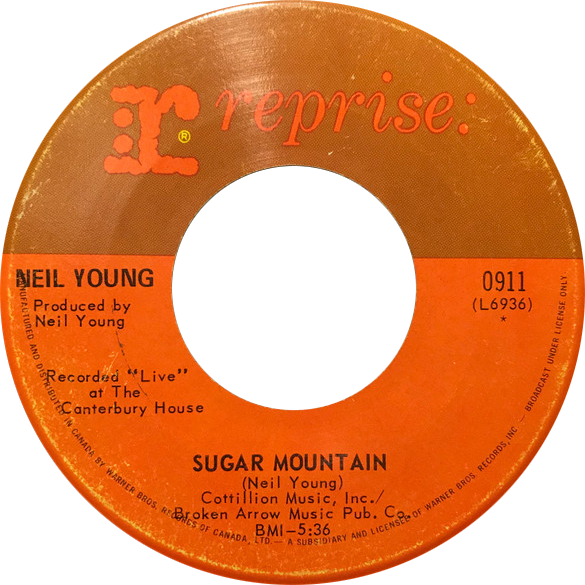
- Side B of the "Cinnamon Girl" Canadian single

Single by Neil Young

from the album Decade
- A-side: "The Loner" (1969) "Cinnamon Girl" (1970) "When You Dance I Can Really Love" (1971) "Heart of Gold" (1971) "Lookin' for a Love" (1975)
- B-side: "The Needle and the Damage Done" (1977)
- Released: October 28, 1977 (Decade)
- Recorded: November 10, 1968
- Venue: Canterbury House, Ann Arbor
- Genre: Folk rock
- Length: 5:45
- Label: Reprise
- Songwriter: Neil Young
- Producer: Neil Young

Audio
- "Sugar Mountain" (live, 1968) by Neil Young on YouTube

"Sugar Mountain" is a song by Canadian folk rock singer and composer Neil Young. Young composed the song on November 12, 1964, his 19th birthday, at the Victoria Hotel in Fort William, Ontario (now Thunder Bay), where he had been touring with his Winnipeg band the Squires. Its lyrics are reminiscences about his youth in Winnipeg, Manitoba.

== Releases ==
The first known recording of the song was made on December 15, 1965, for a demo record at Elektra Records in New York City; this version appears on the "Early Years" disc on The Archives Vol. 1 1963–1972. The first formal release was a recording of the song made on November 10, 1968, as part of a live performance at Canterbury House in Ann Arbor, Michigan. This recording was released as the B-side of Young's 1969 single "The Loner" (and again as the B-side of the "Cinnamon Girl" the following year), but was not collected on an album until the 3-LP compilation Decade was released in 1977. A CD/DVD release of recordings from the Canterbury House performance, Sugar Mountain - Live at Canterbury House 1968, was released November 25, 2008 as part of Young's ongoing Archives Performance Series; this release includes the first-ever stereo mix of "Sugar Mountain" itself.

Young recorded the song again in February 1969, as part of a series of live shows at the Riverboat in Toronto; this version is included in the 2009 Archives Performance Series release Live at the Riverboat 1969. Still another live rendition is included as the first track of Young's 1979 album Live Rust. The most recent live version is on the 2022 first release of his "Official Bootleg Series" Royce Hall recorded January 30, 1971.

== Meaning of the lyrics ==
In a concert at the Albert Hall in London on October 29, 1970, Joni Mitchell, who was already friends with Young by the time he wrote this song, introduced her song "The Circle Game" with this speech:

Mitchell: "In 1965 I was up in Canada, and there was a friend of mine up there who had just left a rock'n'roll band (...) he had just newly turned 21 [actually Young had turned 19 in November 1964], and that meant he was no longer allowed into his favourite haunt, which was kind of a teeny-bopper club and once you're over 21 you couldn't get back in there anymore; so he was really feeling terrible because his girlfriends and everybody that he wanted to hang out with, his band could still go there, you know, but it's one of the things that drove him to become a folk singer was that he couldn't play in this club anymore. 'Cause he was over the hill. (...) So he wrote this song that was called "Oh to live on sugar mountain" which was a lament for his lost youth. (...) And I thought, God, you know, if we get to 21 and there's nothing after that, that's a pretty bleak future, so I wrote a song for him, and for myself just to give me some hope. It's called The Circle Game."

In February 1971 at the Dorothy Chandler Pavilion in Los Angeles, Young spoke at length about the lyrics. (The concert was released years later on archival album "1971 Journey Through the Past Solo Tour".) He says that when he first wrote the song, he wrote 126 verses to it.

Young: "Now, you can imagine that I had a lot of trouble figuring out what four verses to use... I was underneath the stairs at the time... Anyway, this verse that I wrote... It was the worst verse of the 126 that I wrote. So, I decided to put it in the song, just to give everybody a frame of reference as to, you know, what can happen. What I'm trying to say is, by stopping in the middle of the song, and explaining this to you, is that... I think it's one of the lamest verses I ever wrote. And, uhh...it takes a lotta nerve for me to get up here and sing it in front of you people. But, if when I'm finished singing, you sing the chorus 'Sugar Mountain' super loud, I'll just forget about it right away and we can continue."

He then continues with the "worst verse", about being "underneath the stairs... And [...] giving' back some glares, To the people that you met, And it's your first cigarette".

== Personnel ==
- Neil Young – guitar, vocals
