= The Squires =

Canadian band

- Poster for The Squires

Background information
- Origin: Winnipeg, Manitoba, Canada
- Genres: Surf, rock
- Years active: 1963–1965
- Label: V Records
- Past members: Neil Young; Allan Bates; Jack Harper; Ken Smyth; Ken Koblun; Jeff Wuckert

The Squires or Neil Young & The Squires were a Canadian band formed in 1963 in Winnipeg. It was one of the first bands of singer-songwriter Neil Young.

== Recordings ==
Young formed the Squires in 1963, and the group played at community clubs, high school dances and proms in Winnipeg with Young on electric guitar. They played a lot of songs by The Shadows, The Ventures, and The Fireballs.

Young began writing songs, which the band played regularly. On July 23, two of these were recorded by Harry Taylor of local radio station CKRC in a tiny two-track recording studio. The recordings, "Aurora" and "The Sultan", were released later that year as a single released by V Records. 300 records were pressed; in 2006 only around 10 were known to still exist. As of 2024, Discogs lists 23 people as self-proclaimed owners of a copy.

Don and Dewey's song "Farmer John" was a regular staple of their live set, and Young would eventually record it with Crazy Horse on his 1990 album Ragged Glory. The Squires recorded the song "I Wonder," three different times; it became the basis of Young's song "Don't Cry No Tears" on his 1975 album Zuma. "Aint It the Truth" was performed by the Squires, and later recorded by Neil Young & The Bluenotes on his 1988 album This Note's For You.

The band played engagements out of town in nearby rural southern Manitoba towns such as Selkirk, Portage la Prairie, Neepawa, Brandon, and Giroux (near Steinbach), and as far from Winnipeg as Churchill, Manitoba and Fort William, Ontario, traveling in a 1948 Buick Roadmaster hearse, dubbed Mortimer Hearseburg, or Mort. In April 1964, the group again entered CKRC studios to record with Harry Taylor, and, according to Young recorded "about twenty songs." According to drummer Ken Smyth, these were for a possible deal with London Records of Canada.

Young's song "Sugar Mountain" was written while on tour in Fort William with The Squires. In November of that year the band was invited by Fort William CJLX radio DJ into the station studio, where two versions of "I'll Love You Forever" were recorded. By this time Young had dropped out of high school to concentrate on the band and his music. In 1965, with a new drummer, Bob Clark, the band moved to Fort William. It was here that Young met Stephen Stills. By early 1966, The Squires had disbanded, and Young had joined the Toronto band the Mynah Birds. Soon thereafter Young moved to California and joined Buffalo Springfield, where former Squires bassist Ken Koblun was also briefly a member of the band.

Years after the group's disbandment, Young's 2009 collection The Archives Vol. 1 1963–1972 opened with six recordings by The Squires, including the V Records single, mastered from a vinyl copy.

The Squires are mentioned in Randy Bachman's 1992 single "Prairie Town." The song also features Neil Young on guitar and backing vocals.

== Discography ==
=== Singles ===
Year	Title	Label
1963	The Sultan / Aurora	V records
2008	Mustang / Aurora	Reprise Records

=== Compilations ===
Year	Title	Label
2009	The Archives Vol. 1 1963–1972 ==== Tracks featuring the Squires ==== : 1. Aurora [V Records 45"] – 2:10; 2. The Sultan [V Records 45"] – 2:35; 3. I Wonder [Apr 2, 1964 CKRC studios] – 2:24; 4. Mustang [Apr 2, 1964 CKRC studios] – 2:26; 5. I'll Love You Forever [Nov 23, 1964 CJLX studios] – 3:25; 6. (I'm A Man And) I Can't Cry [Winter/Spring 1965, Winnipeg] – 2:35	Reprise Records
