= I've Been Waiting for You (Neil Young song) =

1968 song by Neil Young

Single by Neil Young

from the album Neil Young
- A-side: "Oh, Lonesome Me"
- Released: November 12, 1968
- Recorded: October 9, 1968
- Studio: TTG Recording Studios, Los Angeles
- Genre: Folk rock
- Length: 2:30
- Label: Reprise
- Songwriter: Neil Young
- Producers: Neil Young; David Briggs

"I've Been Waiting for You" is a song written by Neil Young, which he recorded for his 1968 self-titled debut solo album. It was later released as the B-side to Young's later single "Oh, Lonesome Me". In a song review for AllMusic, critic Matthew Greenwald described it as "One of the most powerful and well-crafted songs from Neil Young's self-titled solo debut ... A very strong and engaging melody is set against a striking, descending guitar riff, which serves as the song's hook."

Young did not perform the song with Crazy Horse or Crosby, Stills, Nash & Young, although he recorded a live solo acoustic version in November 1968, just a few days before the release of the album version. It was later included on the live album Sugar Mountain – Live at Canterbury House 1968, released in 2008.

David Bowie, the Pixies, and Dinosaur Jr. have recorded renditions of the song.

== Personnel ==
- Neil Young – guitar, piano, pipe organ, vocals
- Jim Messina – bass
- George Grantham – drums

== David Bowie version ==
"I've Been Waiting for You"

Single by David Bowie

from the album Heathen
- B-side: "Sunday" (Tony Visconti mix)
- Released: October 2002 (Canada)
- Recorded: August–September 2001; October 2001 – January 2002
- Studio: Allaire (Shokan, New York); Looking Glass (New York City)
- Length: 3:00
- Label: Columbia
- Songwriter: Neil Young
- Producers: David Bowie; Tony Visconti

David Bowie singles chronology
"Everyone Says 'Hi'" (2002)	"I've Been Waiting for You" (2002)	"New Killer Star" (2003)

David Bowie recorded a version of the song, which features Dave Grohl on guitar, for his album Heathen (2002). His version of "I've Been Waiting for You" was released as a single in Canada and reached number 11 in the single charts.

Bowie's band Tin Machine performed the song during their 1991-92 It's My Life Tour, sung by Reeves Gabrels. One such live version appeared on the live video release Tin Machine Live: Oy Vey, Baby. Bowie played the song live again on his solo Heathen Tour (2002) and A Reality Tour (2003). A longer version of the album version (3:16 versus 3:00) appeared on the Heathen Super Audio CD (2002) and on the box set I Can't Give Everything Away (2002–2016) (2025).

=== Track listing ===
CD: ISO-Columbia / 38K 003369 (Canada)

1. "I've Been Waiting for You (album version)" – 3:00
2. "Sunday (Tony Visconti mix)" – 4:56
3. "Shadow Man" – 4:46

=== Personnel ===
According to Chris O'Leary and Benoit Clerc:

- David Bowie – lead and backing vocals, synthesizers, rhythm guitar, Theremin
- Dave Grohl – lead guitar
- Tony Visconti – bass guitar, backing vocals
- Matt Chamberlain – drums, loops

Technical

- David Bowie – producer
- Tony Visconti – producer, engineer
- Brandon Mason – assistant engineer (Allaire Studios)
- Todd Vos – assistant engineer (Allaire Studios)
- Hector Castillo – assistant engineer (Looking Glass Studios)
- Christian Rutledge – assistant engineer (Looking Glass Studios)
