= Fork in the Road =

Studio album by Neil Young
- Released: April 7, 2009
- Recorded: December 19 – 21, 2008 (Note: except "When Worlds Collide": August 30, 2008)
- Studio: Legacy Studios, New York City (Note: except "When Worlds Collide": RAK Studios, London)
- Genre: Rock; folk rock
- Length: 38:46
- Label: Reprise
- Producer: Neil Young; Niko Bolas (credited as "The Volume Dealers"

Neil Young chronology
Sugar Mountain – Live at Canterbury House 1968 (2008)	Fork in the Road (2009)	Live at the Riverboat 1969 (2009)

Singles from Fork in the Road
- 1. "Fork in the Road" Released: February 3, 2009; 2. "Johnny Magic" Released: March 10, 2009

Professional ratings
Aggregate scores
Source	Rating
Metacritic	61/100
Review scores
Source	Rating
AllMusic	3.5/5 stars
The A.V. Club	B−
Entertainment Weekly	C
The Guardian	2/5 stars
Los Angeles Times	2.5/4 stars
MSN Music (Consumer Guide)	A−
musicOMH	4/5 stars
PopMatters	4/10
Rolling Stone	3/5 stars
Uncut	4/5 stars

Fork in the Road is the thirty-first studio album by Canadian / American musician Neil Young, released April 7, 2009, on Reprise Records. The album was released on vinyl on July 26, 2009.

== Background ==
The album was inspired by Young's Lincoln Continental that had been retooled to run entirely on alternative energy, and Young's background with the Lincvolt project he has been working on alongside mechanic Jonathan Goodwin. The project has been to develop a viable electric energy power system for automobiles. Young's own 1959 Lincoln Continental will serve as their completed prototype. A documentary produced by Larry Johnson followed the electric car in its first long-distance trip to Washington, DC. Young also published his thoughts on the topic through a series of posts to the Huffington Post website.

In November 2010, the car started a fire that caused over a million dollars of damage to a warehouse and possessions of Young stored there. Young blamed the fire on human error and said he and his team were committed to rebuilding the car. "The wall charging system was not completely tested and had never been left unattended. A mistake was made. It was not the fault of the car", he said.

== Writing ==
The song "Fuel Line" was inspired by rising fuel prices and Young's interest in alternative fuels and energy sources. Young explains in his memoir, Special Deluxe: "With gasoline priced at $2.35 per gallon, vacillating wildly from year to year on its overall steady climb, I had recorded a song called "Fuel Line," featuring the choruses 'Fill 'er up' and 'Keep fillin' that fuel line.' I was writing and performing a lot of songs about Lincvolt and the subject of electric powered cars. Fork in the Road, the album we made, was released in 2009. A lot of people were pissed that I made an album about that subject and I got bad reviews, but it was what was on my mind and I can be obsessive. Being obsessive is not such a bad thing for creativity."

"The gas station is the tentacle of big oil, which reaches out and touches all of us daily. If you can eliminate roadside refueling, then whatever technology can do that will also change the way we generate power—the heat in our houses and the power that turns on the lights and all those things—and the way the world works. I really think it’s time for us to try to do that. No goal was ever met by not setting it."

"Johnny Magic" was written for Wichita mechanic Jonathan Goodwin of H-Line Conversions. Young had hired Goodwin to convert his 1959 Lincoln Continental convertible to a hybrid vehicle. Young had chosen one of the largest vehicles in his collection for conversion to electric power to demonstrate what was possible:

"People love their cars, especially here in America, and have a spirit that they associate with their car. They love their big cars. They love their big roads, and they're big people. So you can't sell a tiny electric car to Americans. You can sell it to some of them, but it's not an easy sell. So there are ways to eliminate roadside refueling, and what we need to do is make these ways attractive to people so they don’t lose the spirit of the car."

"Cough Up the Bucks" was inspired by the 2008 financial crisis and the Emergency Economic Stabilization Act of 2008. Young explains in a 2019 post to his website: "This song is one of my all time favorites. There was a huge crash in the market. 2008. We were in Wichita building Lincvolt. The world was watching the US economy implode. It was obvious who got screwed. There is a piece of history if I ever saw one."

== Recording ==
The album was recorded in December 2008 at Legacy Studios in New York. "When Worlds Collide" was recorded prior to the sessions in August 2008 at RAK Studios in London.

== Reception ==
Young's vocal performance on "Fork in the Road" was nominated for Best Solo Rock Vocal Performance at the 52nd Grammy Awards, 2010.

== Track listing ==
All songs written and composed by Neil Young

No.	Title	Length
1.	"When Worlds Collide"	4:14
2.	"Fuel Line"	3:11
3.	"Just Singing a Song"	3:31
4.	"Johnny Magic"	4:18
5.	"Cough Up the Bucks"	4:38
6.	"Get Behind the Wheel"	3:08
7.	"Off the Road"	3:22
8.	"Hit the Road"	3:36
9.	"Light a Candle"	3:01
10.	"Fork in the Road"	5:47

== Personnel ==
- Neil Young – electric and acoustic guitar, vocals, production
- Ben Keith – lap steel guitar, electric guitar, Hammond B-3 organ, vocals
- Anthony Crawford – electric and acoustic guitar, piano, Hammond B-3 organ, vocals
- Pegi Young – vibes, acoustic guitar, vocals
- Rick Rosas – bass
- Chad Cromwell – drums
- Larry Cragg – guitar technician
- Don McAulay – drum technician
- Craig Roberts – guitar technician

Additional roles

- Niko Bolas – production, recording, mixing
- Missy Webb, Rich Woodcraft – engineering
- Kevin Porter, Heidi Martin – assistant engineering
- John Netti – assistant production, analog to digital transfers
- Nathan Yarborough – assistant production
- Richard Dodd – digital editing, mastering
- John Nowland – analog to digital transfers

Blu-ray production

- Bernard Shakey (Neil Young) – direction, photography direction (music videos)
- L.A. Johnson – production, photography direction (studio videos), menu photography (concert video)
- Elliot Rabinowitz – executive production
- Will Mitchell – associate production, audio production (music videos), menu photography (concert videos)
- Toshi Onuki – art direction, editing (music videos), menu photography (concert videos)
- Mark Faulkner – editing
- Benjamin Johnson – editing, photography, direction (music videos, concert video)
- Chistopher Hedge – mixing
- Kris Kunz – assistant production
- Tim Mulligan – mastering
- Steve Cross – menu photography (concert videos)
- Larry Cragg – band photography

== Charts ==
Chart (2009)	Peak position
Australian Albums (ARIA)	37
Austrian Albums (Ö3 Austria)	45
Belgian Albums (Ultratop Flanders)	13
Belgian Albums (Ultratop Wallonia)	48
Canadian Albums (Billboard)	15
Danish Albums (Hitlisten)	15
Dutch Albums (Album Top 100)	23
Finnish Albums (Suomen virallinen lista)	16
French Albums (SNEP)	31
German Albums (Offizielle Top 100)	17
Irish Albums (IRMA)	18
Italian Albums (FIMI)	36
New Zealand Albums (RMNZ)	28
Norwegian Albums (VG-lista)	1
Spanish Albums (Promusicae)	38
Swedish Albums (Sverigetopplistan)	11
Swiss Albums (Schweizer Hitparade)	65
UK Albums (OCC)	22
US Billboard 200	19
US Top Rock Albums (Billboard)	4
US Indie Store Album Sales (Billboard)	2
