= Riverboat Coffee House =

Canadian coffeehouse

The Riverboat coffee house
- Interactive map of The Riverboat coffee house
- Location: 134 Yorkville Avenue; Toronto, Ontario, Canada
- Coordinates: 43°40′15.11″N 79°23′38.73″W
- Owner: Bernie Fiedler
- Capacity: 120
- Type: Coffeehouse
- Event: Folk music.

Construction
- Opened: October 1964
- Closed: June 25, 1978

The Riverboat Coffee House was a Canadian coffeehouse located at 134 Yorkville Avenue in the Yorkville neighbourhood of Toronto, Ontario, Canada. It was a key venue for folk rock music and singer songwriter music made famous for featuring high-profile acts, and is considered to be "the best-known coffee house in Canada." It opened in October 1964 and closed on June 25, 1978.

== History ==
The Riverboat was owned by Bernie & Patricia (a.k.a. Sola, a well-known artist) Fiedler. Located in a basement, its decor was modelled after the interior of a boat, featuring port hole windows and intimate booths. Legend has it that American protest singer Phil Ochs wrote one of his best-known songs, "Changes", on the back porch.

== Notable performers ==
Numerous Canadian artists, including Lenny Breau, Joni Mitchell, Neil Young, Ian & Sylvia, Gordon Lightfoot, Bruce Cockburn, Murray McLauchlan and Billie Hughes, played the Riverboat. A frequent stop on the touring circuit, many American artists, such as John Lee Hooker, James Taylor, Tim Hardin, Simon and Garfunkel, and Phil Ochs, also appeared there.

== Live albums recorded ==
Live at the Riverboat 1969 by Neil Young

== Songs written at or about the Riverboat ==
- Gordon Lightfoot. "Steel Rail Blues" Lightfoot!
- Joni Mitchell. "Night in the City" Song to a Seagull
- Neil Young. "Ambulance Blues" On the Beach
- Phil Ochs. "Changes" Phil Ochs in Concert
