= Live at Massey Hall 1971 =

2007 live album by Neil Young

Live album by Neil Young
- Released: March 13, 2007
- Recorded: January 19, 1971
- Venue: Massey Hall, Toronto, Ontario, Canada
- Genre: Folk rock
- Length: 67:39
- Label: Reprise
- Producer: David Briggs; Neil Young

Neil Young chronology
| Living with War: In the Beginning (2006) | Live at Massey Hall 1971 (2007) | Chrome Dreams II (2007) |

Archives Performance Series chronology
| PS02.5: Live at the Cellar Door (2013) | PS03: Live at Massey Hall 1971 (2007) | PS03.5: Young Shakespeare (2021) |

Professional ratings
Review scores
| Source | Rating |
|---|---|
| Allmusic | 4.5/5 stars |
| CLUAS | (8.5/10) |
| LA Daily News | 3.5/4 stars |
| Music Box | 5/5 stars |
| Okayplayer | 4/5 stars |
| Pitchfork Media | (8.0/10) |
| Robert Christgau | (dud) |
| Rolling Stone | 4/5 stars |
| Uncut | 5/5 stars |

Live at Massey Hall 1971 is a live album by Canadian-American musician Neil Young. Released in 2007, the album features a solo acoustic performance by Young at Massey Hall in Toronto, Ontario, Canada, on 19 January 1971 during his Journey Through the Past Solo Tour. It is the second release in Young's Archives Performance Series.

The album reached #1 in Canada with 11,000 units sold in its first week. It debuted at #9 on the Irish Charts, #30 on the UK albums chart, and #6 on the Billboard 200 on 31 March 2007, with 57,000 copies sold. It spent 11 weeks on the latter chart, and in 2009 was named by Fretbase as the second-best album featuring a singer-songwriter on acoustic guitar of all time. The CD release is paired with a DVD featuring footage from a performance at the Shakespeare Theatre in Stratford, Connecticut.

== Setlist ==
Though the set of songs featured that night was similar to other concerts during the tour, the bulk of the songs played would have been unfamiliar to the audience. Of the eighteen songs Young performed during his second set that night, only eight had already appeared on record. These include songs that Young recorded with the bands Buffalo Springfield and Crosby, Stills, Nash & Young, or had released on one of his three solo albums to date.

Five additional songs performed would appear one year later on the landmark album Harvest (though there are noticeable differences in the lyrics to "A Man Needs a Maid"). One song, "Bad Fog of Loneliness", makes its first appearance with this release. The remaining four songs were included on several of Young's subsequent 1970s albums: "Love in Mind" and "Journey Through the Past" appeared on the 1973 live album Time Fades Away; "See the Sky About to Rain" was released in a different arrangement on the 1974 album On the Beach; and "Dance Dance Dance" appeared on Crazy Horse's February 1971 debut album, and was rewritten with new lyrics for the 1977 compilation album Decade as "Love Is a Rose". The reworked version later became a hit for Linda Ronstadt.

Many of the songs appear in a form that virtually duplicates live takes found on other albums. "Cowgirl in the Sand", "Don't Let It Bring You Down", and "Down By the River" are unchanged from the versions that appear on 4 Way Street. "Journey Through the Past" and "Love in Mind" are similar to the performances found on Time Fades Away. "The Needle and the Damage Done" appeared as a live track on the studio album Harvest.

== Track listing ==
All songs written by Neil Young.

| No. | Title | Length |
|---|---|---|
| 1. | "On The Way Home" | 3:42 |
| 2. | "Tell Me Why" | 2:29 |
| 3. | "Old Man" | 4:57 |
| 4. | "Journey Through The Past" | 4:15 |
| 5. | "Helpless" | 4:16 |
| 6. | "Love In Mind" | 4:16 |
| 7. | "A Man Needs A Maid / Heart Of Gold Suite" | 6:39 |
| 8. | "Cowgirl in the Sand" | 3:45 |
| 9. | "Don't Let It Bring You Down" | 2:46 |
| 10. | "There's A World" | 3:33 |
| 11. | "Bad Fog of Loneliness" | 3:27 |
| 12. | "The Needle and the Damage Done" | 3:55 |
| 13. | "Ohio" | 3:40 |
| 14. | "See The Sky About To Rain" | 4:05 |
| 15. | "Down By The River" | 4:08 |
| 16. | "Dance Dance Dance" | 5:48 |
| 17. | "I Am A Child" | 3:19 |

== DVD ==
The concert at Massey Hall was not filmed. Instead, the footage used for the DVD release, featuring Young performing a number of tracks, was sourced from a performance at the Shakespeare Theatre in Stratford, Connecticut, three days later, with the Massey Hall audio dubbed on top. The footage was filmed for a 1971 TV documentary by Dutch documentary filmmaker Wim van der Linden, which was never broadcast in The Netherlands but was in Germany, with the German title Swing in mit Neil Young. Where there was a lack of video performances of certain songs, footage of the reel-to-reel tape recorder used onstage fills the screen instead.

The DVD also contains performances of "The Needle and the Damage Done" and "Journey Through the Past" from The Johnny Cash Show, filmed in February 1971 (which, during an interlude between songs on the audio recording, Young refers to as a scheduled future performance), as well as an interview from the aforementioned Swing in mit Neil Young TV documentary and footage of Young meeting to discuss the Archives project at his Broken Arrow Ranch, filmed in February 1997.

== 1971 near-release ==
For much of 1971, Young was recuperating from a debilitating slipped disc back injury (he references this injury at the beginning of the "Helpless" take, saying, "bending over is... not so much fun" after dropping a pick). The year was the first since 1965 not to see a new studio album released by Young. The release of a live album was scheduled for March 1971. It may have featured material from just this show, or from several shows, including the one featured on the first Archives release, Live at the Fillmore East. According to Young, "This is the album that should have come out between After the Gold Rush and Harvest...David Briggs, my producer, was adamant that this should be the record, but I was very excited about the takes we got on Harvest, and wanted Harvest out. David disagreed. As I listen to this today, I can see why." Instead of the solo album, Atlantic Records ultimately released a Crosby, Stills, Nash and Young live album, 4 Way Street, on 7 April 1971.

== Personnel ==
- Neil Young – acoustic guitar, piano, vocals

Additional roles

- David Briggs – production, tracking engineering
- Henry Saskowski – technical supervision
- John Nowland – analog to digital transferring
- Tim Mulligan – editing, mastering
- John Hausmann – assistant engineering
- Harry Sitam – engineering

DVD production

- Bernard Shakey (Neil Young) – direction
- L.A. Johnson – production
- Elliot Rabinowitz – executive production
- Will Mitchell – associate production
- Wim van der Linden – filming
- Toshi Onuki – editing, art direction
- Joel Berstein – archiving, photography
- Rich Winter – authoring
- Ziemowit Darski, Chiaki Darski, Max Merbaum – graphics production
- Mark Faulkner – documentary editing
- Adam Sturgeon – production assistance
- Henry Diltz, Larry Lindsay – photography

== Charts ==
=== Weekly charts ===
| Chart (2007) | Peak position |
|---|---|
| Australian Albums (ARIA) | 34 |
| Austrian Albums (Ö3 Austria) | 54 |
| Belgian Albums (Ultratop Flanders) | 20 |
| Canadian Albums (Billboard) | 1 |
| Dutch Albums (Album Top 100) | 5 |
| French Albums (SNEP) | 78 |
| German Albums (Offizielle Top 100) | 63 |
| Irish Albums (IRMA) | 9 |
| Italian Albums (FIMI) | 30 |
| Norwegian Albums (VG-lista) | 6 |
| Scottish Albums (OCC) | 26 |
| Swedish Albums (Sverigetopplistan) | 5 |
| UK Albums (OCC) | 30 |
| US Billboard 200 | 6 |
| US Top Rock Albums (Billboard) | 2 |
| US Indie Store Album Sales (Billboard) | 1 |

=== Year-end charts ===
| Chart (2007) | Position |
|---|---|
| Dutch Albums (Album Top 100) | 99 |
