= Let's Impeach the President =

Single by Neil Young

from the album Living with War
- Released: April 28, 2006
- Recorded: April 1, 2006
- Studio: Redwood Digital
- Genre: Rock
- Length: 5:04
- Label: Reprise
- Songwriter(s): Neil Young
- Producer(s): Niko Bolas; Neil Young

Neil Young singles chronology
| "Let's Roll" (2001) | "Let's Impeach the President" (2006) | "Fork in the Road" (2009) |

Sample of "Let's Impeach the President" from Deja Vu Live.
This sample shows the use of audio recordings of George W Bush in the song.

"Let's Impeach the President" is a protest song written, produced and recorded by Neil Young. It is the seventh track on his 2006 studio album Living with War.

It starts off with a trumpet playing the first six notes of "Taps", followed by a chorus singing about various reasons to impeach then-U.S. President George W. Bush. The song contains sound clips from the president's speeches.

Young attempted to trick Stephen Colbert (who was then in character) into playing the song on his August 17, 2006, appearance on The Colbert Report.

== Personnel ==
- Neil Young – guitar, vocals
- Rick Rosas – bass
- Chad Cromwell – drums
- Tommy Bray – trumpet
- 100 Voices Choir – backing vocals

== See also ==
- Efforts to impeach George W. Bush
- List of anti-war songs
