= Don't Let It Bring You Down (Neil Young song) =

Song by Neil Young

from the album After the Gold Rush
- Released: September 19, 1970
- Recorded: March 17, 1970
- Studio: Neil Young's home (Topanga, California)
- Genre: Roots rock; folk rock
- Length: 2:56
- Label: Reprise
- Songwriter: Neil Young
- Producers: David Briggs; Neil Young

"Don't Let It Bring You Down" is the seventh track on Neil Young's 1970 studio album After the Gold Rush.

== Background ==
The song was written by Young. It also appears on the 1971 Crosby, Stills, Nash & Young live album 4 Way Street as well as Young's 2007 album Live at Massey Hall 1971, which was recorded in 1971, and Young's 2013 album Live at the Cellar Door, which was recorded in 1970. John Reed wrote an arrangement of this for The Hampton String Quartet in 2006.

The song is played in double drop C tuning, which is similar to double drop D; however, the whole guitar is down tuned a whole step first, making the guitar strings C, G, C, F, A, and C.

On 4 Way Street, Young says, "Here is a new song, it's guaranteed to bring you right down, it's called 'Don't Let It Bring You Down'. It sorta starts off real slow and then fizzles out altogether." The crowd then roars with laughter.

== Personnel ==
- Neil Young – guitar, vocals
- Nils Lofgren – piano
- Greg Reeves – bass
- Ralph Molina – drums

== Cover versions ==
- Perhaps the first cover was recorded by Caleb Quaye's band Hookfoot in 1971.
- It was also covered by Victoria Williams on the 1989 anthology album The Bridge: A Tribute to Neil Young.
- Annie Lennox covered the song on her 1995 Medusa album; her version also appeared in the movie American Beauty (1999).
- Alexa Ray Joel covered the song on her 2006 EP entitled Sketches.
- Chris Cornell covered it live on his Acoustic Songbook show at the Troubadour.
- Guns N' Roses covered the song in 2012 during their Appetite for Democracy residency in Vegas.
- Manfred Mann's Earth Band often performs the song live in an up-tempo arrangement. One such version can be found on the collection Odds & Sods – Mis-takes & Out-takes and another one, in a slightly different arrangement, on the DVD Angel Station in Moscow.
- Jazz pianist Brad Mehldau covered the song on his 2020 album Suite: April 2020.
- Cowboy Junkies covered it on the 2022 covers album Songs of the Recollection.
