= The Loner (Neil Young song) =

- 7" vinyl Portuguese single cover

Single by Neil Young

from the album Neil Young
- B-side: "Sugar Mountain"
- Released: February 21, 1969
- Recorded: August 28, 1968
- Studio: Wally Heider Recording; Sunset Sound Recorders; TTG Recording, Hollywood
- Genre: Country rock, hard rock
- Length: 3:05 (single); 3:55 (album)
- Label: Reprise
- Songwriter: Neil Young
- Producers: Neil Young; David Briggs

Neil Young singles chronology
"The Loner" (1969)	"Down by the River" (1969)

"The Loner" is a song by Neil Young, his first solo single. It was released on his solo debut album in November 1968, and then an edited version as his debut solo single three months later on Reprise Records. It missed the Billboard Hot 100 chart completely, but over time has become a staple of his performance repertoire. Both it and "Sugar Mountain", its B-side recorded live at the Canterbury House in Ann Arbor, Michigan, were released on album together for his 1977 compilation, Decade.

== History ==
"The Loner" was written while Buffalo Springfield was in its last throes. The widely held assumption that the song was written about Stephen Stills (who covered the song on his 1976 album Illegal Stills) can perhaps not be disproved (Young himself rarely provides clarity on such issues), but it is perhaps more likely that the song is autobiographical in nature, especially since Young was, of all Springfield members, the most bothered by playing as a member of a band.

Recorded with former Springfield member Jim Messina (bass) and George Grantham (drums) (they were uncredited on the album sleeve), it is the first Young track produced by David Briggs, with whom Young would collaborate until Briggs's death. Strings were arranged by David Blumberg, whom Young met through Briggs. Young's guitar is in Double drop D tuning; "psycho guitar noises" were made, according to Briggs, by putting the guitar through a Leslie speaker (the sound has also been referred to as a "fuzztoned rave-up"). The lyrics are characterized by dread and disorientation, coming from an "immobile protagonist" who "witnesses extraordinary visual displays".

Praise came quickly. Rolling Stone said: "'The Loner' is a contemporary lament that features a nice blending of Neil's guitar with strings in non-obtrusive fashion, allowing Young's balanced ice-pick vocal to chip effectively at the listener." Cash Box said that there was "tremendous power in the instrumentals and [Young's] vocal." Allmusic critic Matthew Greenwald stated that "lyrically, it's one of Young's finest autobiographical songs, a virtual self-portrait. The song is still played live, as is one other song from Neil Young, "The Old Laughing Lady". Stephen Stills has played the song live with and without Young.

The song was featured on the soundtrack of the 1970 movie The Strawberry Statement and is included on the movie soundtrack album.

== Personnel ==
- Neil Young – guitar, pipe organ, vocals
- Jim Messina – bass
- George Grantham – drums
- Other – violins, celli

== Notable covers ==
"The Loner" has been covered by the following artists:

- Three Dog Night on their debut album (1968)
- Richie Havens on Mixed Bag II (1974)
- Stephen Stills on Illegal Stills (1976)
- Henry Kaiser on Heart's Desire (1990)
- Nils Lofgren on his tribute album The Loner - Nils Sings Neil (2008)
- Boxer on their 1979 album Bloodletting
- Ty Segall on his 2018 covers album Fudge Sandwich
- Supergrass on the B-side of their 2003 single Seen the Light
