= The Old Laughing Lady =

Song by Neil Young

from the album Neil Young
- Released: November 12, 1968
- Recorded: October 17, 1968
- Studio: Sunwest Recording Studio, Los Angeles
- Genre: Folk rock
- Length: 5:58
- Label: Reprise
- Songwriter: Neil Young
- Producers: Neil Young; Jack Nitzsche; Ry Cooder

"The Old Laughing Lady" is a song written by Neil Young that was first released on his 1968 debut solo album Neil Young.

== Music and lyrics ==
Allmusic critic Matthew Greenwald describes "The Old Laughing Lady" as a "striking mood piece." He describes the music as being "built on some simple, downcast chord changes, in a modal D guitar tuning," which he says gives the song depth and grandeur. Music critic Johnny Rogan describes the song's use of string instruments and a "ghostly girl chorus" as giving it an "eerie effect."

Young biographer Jimmy McDonough remarks on the song's "sweet, sad countermelodies passing from strings to French horn with beautiful restraint." According to music critic Nigel Williamson, the production by Jack Nitzsche helps give the song a sense of mystery. The song contains four verses but no refrain. The changes in mood and tone over the course of the song are reminiscent of Young's earlier song "Broken Arrow" that he wrote and performed as a member of Buffalo Springfield.

Rolling Stone Magazine critic Gary Von Tersch considers "The Old Laughing Lady" to be the more effective of the two, because he considers it to be "tighter, more mature and [have] more of the quiet explosion to it that Young obviously intends.

The themes of "The Old Laughing Lady" include love, death, alcoholism and alienation. The old laughing lady of the title can be a metaphor for either death or alcohol. The song describes how the old laughing lady affects the lives of those she interacts with.

== Writing and recording ==
"The Old Laughing Lady" was written earlier than most of the songs on Neil Young. According to Young, he wrote it one day on a napkin while drinking coffee in a coffee shop without knowing what prompted it. A version was recorded by Buffalo Springfield for their 1968 album Last Time Around in January 1968.

An even earlier version was tried out during the sessions for Buffalo Springfield's earlier album Buffalo Springfield Again. In the version on Neil Young, Nitzsche used a vocal muting technique that makes Young sound "a million miles away, but right there."

== Reception ==
Neil Young FAQ author Glen Boyd described "The Old Laughing Lady" as having "stood the test of time" since Neil Young was released. Pitchfork contributor Mark Richardson describes the song as having "echoes of the great music to come" from Young's later career. In 2014 the editors of Rolling Stone Magazine ranked it as Young's 63rd all time greatest song, describing it as "California psychedelia with the sun sucked out."

Young included "The Old Laughing Lady" on his 1977 compilation album Decade. A live version was released on Young's 1993 album Unplugged, although Rogan felt that version lacked the mystery and sadness of the original.

== Personnel ==
- Neil Young – vocals
- Ry Cooder – guitar
- Jack Nitzsche – electric piano
- Carol Kaye – bass
- Earl Palmer – drums

=== Additional personnel ===
- Merry Clayton, Brenda Holloway, Patrice Holloway, Gloria Jones, Sherlie Matthews, Gracia Nitzsche – backing vocals
- Other – guitar, trumpet, trombone, tenor sax, French horn, clarinet, strings, timpani
