= Expecting to Fly (song) =

1967 single by Buffalo Springfield

- West German picture sleeve

Single by Buffalo Springfield

from the album Buffalo Springfield Again
- B-side: "Everydays"
- Released: December 16, 1967
- Recorded: May 6, 1967
- Studio: Sunset Sound, Hollywood, Los Angeles
- Genre: Chamber folk
- Length: 3:39; 2:45 (single edit)
- Label: Atco
- Songwriter: Neil Young
- Producers: Jack Nitzsche; Neil Young

Buffalo Springfield singles chronology
| "Rock 'n' Roll Woman" (1967) | "Expecting to Fly" (1967) | "Uno Mundo" (1968) |

"Expecting to Fly" is a song written by Neil Young and performed by Buffalo Springfield. The song appeared on their 1967 album, Buffalo Springfield Again. It would reach #98 on the Billboard Hot 100 in 1968.

During one of the times that Young had left the band, he booked a studio to record the song with outside musicians under the impression that it would be for a Neil Young solo project rather than for Buffalo Springfield. Producer Jack Nitzsche provided the orchestral arrangement featuring a string section plus an English horn. The song does not feature any members of Buffalo Springfield other than Young.

Live versions from Young's early solo performances appear on the albums Live at the Riverboat 1969, Sugar Mountain – Live at Canterbury House 1968, and Live at the Cellar Door.

In the 2018 music documentary film, Echo in the Canyon, it is suggested "Expecting to Fly" marks and exemplifies a shift in a late 1960s's movement from group-oriented folk rock compositions toward more individualized performances and single-artist recordings.

== Other versions ==
- Medicine recorded the song on the Scarred for Life album, in 2019. Original members Brad Laner and Annette Zilinskas (The Bangles, Blood on the Saddle) covered the song, as a beautiful duet.
- Thirteen Senses released the song in 2005 in the United Kingdom as the B-side to their single "The Salt Wound Routine".
- Metric recorded a version in 2011.
- Emily Haines occasionally played it live during her Knives Don't Have Your Back shows.
- of Montreal released the song as a single in 2011 in Norway.
- Tom Wilson recorded the song for the Neil Young Tribute Album Borrowed Tunes II: A Tribute to Neil Young, released in 2007.

== In media ==
- Buffalo Springfield's version appears in the films Coming Home (1978), Purple Haze (1982), Fear and Loathing in Las Vegas (1998), Joy (2015), and Black Box (2021), as well as in the Lilyhammer Season 3 episode "Foreign Affairs" (2014).
