= Back to the Front =

Studio album by The Magic Band
- Released: July 8, 2003
- Studio: Paradoxx Sound Studios, Palmdale, California, US
- Genre: Experimental rock
- Length: 55:37
- Language: English
- Label: ATP Recordings
- Producer: John French; Bob Weston

Back to the Front is the debut album by American experimental rock group The Magic Band, who had previously served as the backing band for Captain Beefheart both live and in the studio for several years. The album received mixed reviews from critics.

== Reception ==
Editors at AllMusic rated this album 4 out of 5 stars, with critic Sean Westergaard writing that on this recording, the band "attack" the songs, "summoning up the controlled chaos that made the original Captain Beefheart recordings such singular achievements" and finished that "if you're a fan, you need this". In The Guardian, David Peschek scored this release 2 out of 5 stars, stating that while the band has the ability to "bamboozle, confound and alarm", but these songs will just "drive you back to the original recordings". Writing for Pitchfork Media, Andy Beta scored Back to the Front a 7.3 out of 10, writing that the song selection is strong and that John French did an admirable job in the absence of original vocalist Captain Beefheart.

== Track listing ==
All songs written by Don Van Vliet.

1. "My Human Gets Me Blues" – 3:12
2. "Click Clack" – 4:04
3. "Abba Zaba" – 2:44
4. "I'm Gonna Booglarize You Baby" – 4:24
5. "Sun Zoom Spark" – 2:22
6. "Alice in Blunderland" – 3:56
7. "Steal Softly Thru Snow" – 2:37
8. "Dropout Boogie" – 2:44
9. "Moonlight on Vermont" – 3:34
10. "Circumstances" – 3:51
11. "On Tomorrow" – 3:47
12. "The Floppy Boot Stomp" – 4:05
13. "Hair Pie" – 2:27
14. "Nowadays a Woman's Gotta Hit a Man" – 4:00
15. "When It Blows It Stacks" – 4:09
16. "I Wanna Find a Woman That'll Hold My Big Toe Till I Have to Go"/"Sure 'Nuff 'n Yes I Do" – 3:47

== Personnel ==
The Magic Band

- Mark Boston – Middle Earth bass guitar, design concept
- John French – Perspective drums, harmonica, vocals, production, design concept
- Gary Lucas – guitar
- Denny Walley – guitar

Additional personnel

- Ben Drury – sleeve design
- Matt Groening – liner notes
- Gary Lucas – photography
- Tim Sutton – photography
- Bob Weston – production

== See also ==
- List of 2003 albums
