= The Magic Band =

Captain Beefheart's backing band

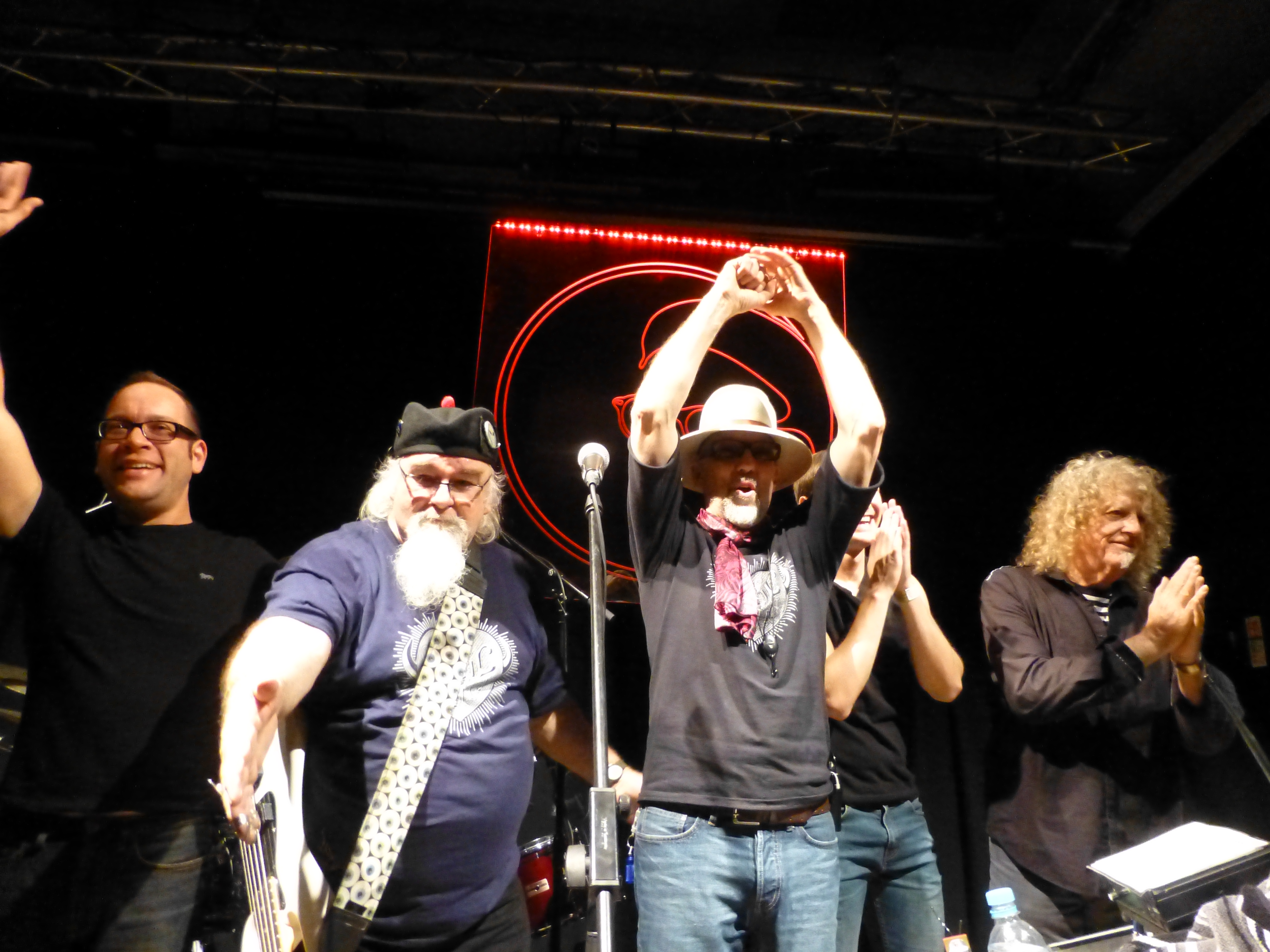
- The Magic Band at a reunion show in Manchester, England, in 2014

Background information
- Origin: Lancaster, Los Angeles, California, United States
- Genres: Blues-rock; avant-rock
- Years active: 1964–1982; 2003–2017
- Labels: A&M; ABC; ATP Recordings; Buddah; Blue Thumb; Mercury; Pye; Reprise; Straight; Virgin
- Past members: See members

The Magic Band was the backing band of American singer, songwriter and multi-instrumentalist Captain Beefheart between 1967 and 1982. The band was formed by guitarist Alex St. Clair with Beefheart as the lead singer; eventually, they morphed into a backing band for him. The rotating lineup featured dozens of performers, many of whom became known by nicknames given to them by Beefheart. In 1974, several members left to form the short-lived group Mallard. In 2003, the Magic Band reformed without Beefheart, who died in 2010, and continued until 2017.

== Origins ==
The members of the original Magic Band had come together in 1964. At this time Don Van Vliet (later 'Captain Beefheart') was the lead singer of the group, which had been brought together by guitarist and former classmate Alex St. Clair. As in many emerging groups in California at the time, there were elements of psychedelia and the foundations of contemporary hippie counterculture. In this early incarnation they were a blues-rock outfit.

The group was promoted as "Captain Beefheart and his Magic Band", on the premise that Captain Beefheart had "magic powers" and, upon drinking a Pepsi, could summon up "His Magic Band" to appear and perform behind him. The strands of this logic emanated from Vliet's Beefheart persona having been "written in" as a character in a "teenage operetta" that friend Frank Zappa had formulated, along with Van Vliet's renowned "Pepsi moods" with his mother Willie Sue and his generally spoilt teenage demeanor. The name "His Magic Band" changed to "the Magic Band" in 1972.

The group played numerous car-club dances and juke joint gigs, and won the Battle of the Bands at the Teenage Fair, an annual event held at the Hollywood Palladium in the 1960s. In late 1965, with Leonard Grant as their manager, the group landed a contract to record two singles with A&M Records. Musical relationships had also been struck with members of Rising Sons, who would later feature in the band's recordings. Working with young producer David Gates opened up horizons for Vliet's skills as a poet-cum-lyricist, with his "Who Do You Think You're Fooling" on the flip side of the band's first single, a cover of the Ellas McDaniel/Willie Dixon-penned hit "Diddy Wah Diddy".

Fate and circumstance, not for the first time, would befall the band's success upon its release – which coincided with a singles cover of the same song by the Remains. The A&M deal also brought some contention between members of the band, who were torn between being an experimental "pop" group and a purist blues band.

The initial line-up of the Magic Band that entered the studio for the A&M recordings was not that which emerged by the second release, "Moonchild", also backed by a Vliet-penned number, "Frying Pan". The original Magic Band was primarily a rhythm and blues band, led by St. Clair, along with Doug Moon (guitar), Jerry Handley (bass), and Vic Mortenson (drums), the last being rotated with and finally replaced by Paul "P.G." Blakely. For the first A&M recording, Mortenson had been called up for active service and St. Clair stood in on drums, with a recently recruited Richard Hepner taking up the guitar role. By the time the single was aired on a pop television show, P.G. Blakely was back in the drum seat. He then left for a career in television and was replaced by John French by the time the band cut their first album, as the first release on the new Buddah Records label.

A 12-inch vinyl 45 rpm mono EP/mono mini-cassette tape was released in 1987, with the four tracks of the two singles, plus "Here I Am, I Always Am" as a fifth previously unreleased song. This release was titled The Legendary A&M Sessions, with a red-marbled cover and (later) members Moon, Blakely, Vliet, St. Clair and Handley seated in a "temperance dance band" photo-pose.

Personnel in the Magic Band for Beefheart's first album, Safe as Milk, were Alex St. Clair, Jerry Handley and John French. Earlier meetings with the Rising Sons had secured them the guitar and arranging skills of Ry Cooder, which also brought about input from Taj Mahal on percussion, and guitar work from Cooder's brother-in-law Russ Titelman. Further guests to this line-up included Milt Holland on percussion and the all-important and controversial theremin work on "Electricity" by Samuel Hoffman. It was perhaps this track, above the others, which caused A&M to view the band as "unsuitable" for their label with music that was seen as weird and too psychedelic for popular consumption. A&M dropped them and the album was recorded for Buddah Records, with the band signed to Kama Sutra Records.

Most of the tracks on this album were co-written with Van Vliet by Herb Bermann, whom Vliet initially met at a bar gig near Lancaster. Bermann would later write for Neil Young and script an early Spielberg-directed television medical drama. Gary "Magic" Marker (the "Magic" added by Beefheart) was involved in early session work for this release, with an unfulfilled suggestion that Marker might produce the album. Marker would later lay down two uncredited bass tracks for Trout Mask Replica before being replaced by Mark Boston.

French worked on five more Beefheart albums, while St. Clair worked with Beefheart on and off on three more albums. Bill Harkleroad joined the Magic Band as guitarist for Trout Mask Replica and stayed with Beefheart through May 1974.

== Relationship with Beefheart ==
While appearing humorous and kind-hearted in public, by all accounts Van Vliet was a severe taskmaster who abused his musicians verbally and physically. Vliet once told drummer John French he had been diagnosed as a paranoid schizophrenic and thus he would see nonexistent conspiracies that explained this behaviour. The band members were reportedly paid little or nothing. French recalled that the musicians' contract with Van Vliet's company stipulated that Van Vliet and the managers were paid from gross proceeds before expenses, then expenses were paid, then the band members evenly split any remaining funds—in effect making band members liable for all expenses. As a result, French was paid nothing at all for a 33-city US tour in 1971 and a total of $78 for a tour of Europe and the US in late 1975. In his 2010 memoir Beefheart: Through The Eyes of Magic French recounted being "... screamed at, beaten up, drugged, ridiculed, humiliated, arrested, starved, stolen from, and thrown down a half-flight of stairs by his employer".

The musicians also resented Van Vliet for taking complete credit for composition and arranging when the musicians themselves pieced together most of the songs from taped fragments or impressionistic directions such as "Play it like a bat being dragged out of oil and it's trying to survive, but it's dying from asphyxiation." John French summarized the disagreement over composing and arranging credits metaphorically:

If Van Vliet built a house like he wrote music, the methodology would go something like this ... The house is sketched on the back of a Denny's placemat in such an odd fashion that when he presents it to the contractor without plans or research, the contractor says "This structure is going to be hard to build, it's going to be tough to make it safe and stable because it is so unique in design." Van Vliet then yells at the contractor and intimidates him into doing the job anyway. The contractor builds the home, figuring out all the intricacies involved in structural integrity himself because whenever he approaches Van Vliet, he finds that he seems completely unable to comprehend technical problems and just yells, "Quit asking me about this stuff and build the damned house."...When the house is finished no one gets paid, and Van Vliet has a housewarming party, invites none of the builders and tells the guests he built the whole thing himself.

Most of the group quit after the recording of Unconditionally Guaranteed in 1974, owing to years of allegedly abusive treatment by Beefheart, lack of compensation, and dissatisfaction with his new crossover direction. Beefheart's subsequent recordings in the late 1970s would enlist a new cast of younger musicians under the Magic Band heading.

== Reunion ==
Receiving only a "grumpy" reception from Van Vliet, the Magic Band re-formed in 2003 with John French on drums, lead vocals and harmonica, Gary Lucas and Denny Walley on guitars, Rockette Morton on bass, and Robert Williams on drums for the vocal numbers. The impetus came from Matt Groening, who wanted them to play at the All Tomorrows Parties festival, which he was curating. For their subsequent European tour, Williams left and was replaced by Michael Traylor.

John Peel was initially skeptical about the re-formed Magic Band. However, after he aired a live recording of the band playing at the 2003 All Tomorrow's Parties (ATP) festival on his radio show, he was at a loss for words and had to put on another record to regain his composure. In 2004 the band did a live session for him at his home "Peel Acres". They played over 30 shows throughout the United Kingdom and Europe, and one in the United States. They also released two albums: Back to the Front (on the London-based ATP Recordings, 2003) and the live album 21st Century Mirror Men (2005).

The group disbanded in 2006 but re-formed in 2011, with Lucas and Traylor replaced by Eric Klerks and Craig Bunch respectively, to play at ATP once again, which was due to take place in November. The festival was postponed until the following March but they honored the other UK and Ireland dates which had been booked to coincide with it, the new line-up being dubbed "The Best Batch Yet". They returned to play the rescheduled ATP and more UK gigs in March 2012, followed by a European tour in September and October. They toured Europe again in 2013 and 2014.

The re-formed band's repertoire was initially drawn mainly from the Clear Spot and Trout Mask Replica albums, with some of the latter's songs performed as instrumentals, allowing the intricacy of the instrumental parts to be heard, where they had previously been obscured by Beefheart's vocals. During subsequent tours the setlist was expanded to include a more representative selection of Beefheart's repertoire. French described the set as "a play which should be rolled out from time to time".

== Members ==
=== Original run ===
==== Classic era ====
- Alex St. Clair – guitar, drums, musical director (1964–68; 1972–74; died 2006)
- Jerry Handley – bass (1964–68)
- John French (Drumbo) – drums, vocals, guitar, musical director (1966–69; 1970–71; 1975–76; 1977; 1980)
- Jeff Cotton (Antennae Jimmy Semens) – guitar, slide guitar, vocals (1967–69)
- Bill Harkleroad (Zoot Horn Rollo) – guitar, slide guitar, musical director (1968–74)
- Mark Boston (Rockette Morton) – bass, guitar (1968–74)
- Victor Hayden (The Mascara Snake) – bass clarinet (1968–69; died 2018)
- Art Tripp (Ed Marimba) – drums, marimba, percussion, piano, harpsichord (1969–74; session guest:1969, 1978)
- Elliot Ingber (Winged Eel Fingerling) – guitar (1970–71; 1971–72; 1974–76; died 2025)
- Roy Estrada (Oréjon) – bass (1972–73; session guest:1969; died 2025)

==== Others ====
- Doug Moon – guitar (1964–67; session guest:1969)
- Paul G. Blakely – drums (1964–65; 1966; died 1995)
- Vic Mortenson – drums (1965)
- Richard Hepner – guitar (1965–66)
- Ry Cooder – guitar, slide guitar (1967)
- Gerry McGee – guitar, slide guitar (1967; died 2019)
- Gary "Magic" Marker – bass (1968; died 2015)
- Jeff Burchell – drums (1969)
- Bruce Fowler (Fossil) – trombone, air bass (1975–76; 1978–80)
- Greg Davidson (Ella Guru) – guitar, slide guitar (1975)
- Jimmy Carl Black (Indian Ink) – drums, percussion (1975; session guest:1969; died 2008)
- Denny Walley (Feelers Rebo) – guitar, slide guitar, accordion (1975–78)
- Jeff Moris Tepper (White Jew) – guitar, slide guitar (1976–82)
- John Thomas – keyboards (1976)
- Eric Drew Feldman (Black Jew Kittaboo) – bass, keyboards (1976–81; session guest:1982)
- Gary Jaye – drums (1976–77; died 2011)
- Robert Williams (Wait For Me) – drums, percussion (1977–81)
- Richard Redus (Mercury Josef) – guitar, slide guitar (1978–79)
- Richard Snyder (Brave Midnight Hat Size) – guitar, slide guitar, bass, marimba, viola (1980–82)
- Gary Lucas – guitar, slide guitar (1980–82)
- Cliff Martinez – drums, percussion, glass washboard (1981–82)

=== Reunion era ===
==== Current ====
- John French – drums, vocals, saxophone, guitar, harmonica (1966–69; 1970–71; 1975–76; 1977; 1980; 2003–2017)
- Mark Boston – bass, guitar (1968–74; 2003–2017)
- Eric Klerks – guitar, bass, iPad (2009–2017)
- Andrew Niven – drums (2013–2017)
- Max Kutner – guitar (2014–2017)
- Jonathan Sindleman – keyboards (2016–2017)

==== Past ====
- Denny Walley – guitar, slide guitar, accordion (1975–78; 2003–14)
- Robert Williams – drums, percussion (1977–81; 2003)
- Gary Lucas –guitar, slide guitar (1980–82; 2003–09)
- Michael Traylor – drums (2003–09)
- Craig Bunch – drums (2009–13)
- Brian Havey – keyboards (2016)

== Discography ==
With Captain Beefheart:

- Safe as Milk (1967)
- Mirror Man (1967, released 1971)
- Strictly Personal (1968)
- Trout Mask Replica (1969)
- Lick My Decals Off, Baby (1970)
- The Spotlight Kid (1972, credited to Beefheart solely)
- Clear Spot (1972)
- Unconditionally Guaranteed (1974)
- Bluejeans & Moonbeams (1974)
- Bat Chain Puller (1976, released 2012)
- Shiny Beast (Bat Chain Puller) (1978)
- Doc at the Radar Station (1980)
- Ice Cream for Crow (1982)

The Magic Band solo:

- Back to the Front (2003)
- 21st Century Mirror Men (2005)
