= Mallard (band) =

American band

- Genres: Country rock; boogie rock; art rock
- Years active: 1974–1976
- Past members: Bill Harkleroad; Mark Boston; Art Tripp; Sam Galpin; Rabbit Bundrick

Mallard was the name of an American band featuring ex-members of Captain Beefheart's Magic Band.

In early 1974, after the recording of the uncharacteristically mainstream Unconditionally Guaranteed album, the tensions between Captain Beefheart and bandmembers Bill Harkleroad (Zoot Horn Rollo), Mark Boston (Rockette Morton) and Art Tripp III (Ed Marimba) had finally reached a breaking point, and the three members left Beefheart's Magic Band. Together, they formed Mallard, with Sam Galpin as vocalist and Rabbit Bundrick on keyboards, releasing their eponymous debut album in 1975, with logistical support from Ian Anderson (of Jethro Tull fame), who financed the recording using his mobile recording unit on his English estate. The debut included a version of the Captain Beefheart instrumental "Peon", as Harkleroad felt the group could improve on the original. Anderson's involvement with Mallard included recording with the group, but Harkleroad later destroyed these recordings. John French (Drumbo) was originally involved with the band, and co-wrote some songs.

In 1976, they released their second and last album, In a Different Climate, and performed some concerts in the United Kingdom. George Dragotta now had been recruited as their drummer, and after Beefheart fired John Thomas, he too joined on keyboards. Thomas was briefly involved in the Magic Band and in the early 1970s had been in a band called Rattlesnakes and Eggs with John French.

Despite the principal members' years together and unique musical abilities, as well as support from the British musical press, Mallard never achieved commercial success.

In 1994, both LPs by Mallard were re-released on CD by Virgin Records in the UK and in the US.

== Personnel ==
- Bill Harkleroad (aka Zoot Horn Rollo) - guitar
- Mark Boston (aka Rockette Morton) - bass, lead vocals and guitar
- Art Tripp III (aka Ed Marimba, Ted Cactus) - drums, percussion, marimba
- Sam Gilpin - lead vocals, piano
- John 'Rabbit' Bundrick - Fender Rhodes piano
- Barry Morgan - percussion
- George Dragotta - drums (2nd LP)
- John McFee - pedal steel guitar (2nd LP)
- John Thomas - keyboards, backing vocals

== Discography ==
- Mallard (Virgin, 1975)
- In A Different Climate (Virgin, 1976)
- "Harvest"/"Green Coyote" (single, Virgin, 1976)
- Mallard/In A Different Climate (compilation, Virgin, 1994)
