= Veteran's Day Poppy =

Veteran's Day Poppy may refer to:

- Veterans Day poppy, the tradition of wearing a remembrance poppy on Veterans Day in the United States
- "Veteran's Day Poppy", a song by Captain Beefheart in the 1969 album Trout Mask Replica
