= Clear Spot =

Studio album by Captain Beefheart and the Magic Band
- Released: October 1972
- Studios: Amigo, LA
- Genres: Blues rock; art rock
- Length: 37:11
- Label: Reprise
- Producer: Ted Templeman

Captain Beefheart and the Magic Band chronology
The Spotlight Kid (1972)	Clear Spot (1972)	Unconditionally Guaranteed (1974)

Singles from Clear Spot
- 1. "Too Much Time / My Head Is My Only House Unless It Rains" Released: 1972

Clear Spot is the seventh studio album by Captain Beefheart and the Magic Band. It was originally released on LP in 1972 in a clear plastic sleeve.

== Production ==
Beefheart's third album Trout Mask Replica had established him as a critically acclaimed artist, but it sold poorly. For this album Beefheart wanted more commercial success—hence his decision to work with the respected team of producer Ted Templeman and engineer Donn Landee, who created hits for the Doobie Brothers and Van Morrison. Clear Spot gathers together much of the lyrical material that Beefheart had created or formulated at the beginning of The Spotlight Kid recordings.

Bassist Roy Estrada, formerly with the Mothers of Invention and Little Feat, joined the band on this album and is credited as "Oréjon" (big ears) on the album's sleeve while noted session percussionist Milt Holland also contributed percussion. This is also the first studio album without longtime drummer John “Drumbo” French, with another former Mothers of Invention member Art Tripp (alias Ed Marimba) now serving as sole drummer.

== Releases ==
The original United States release of the album was in a specially-produced clear plastic sleeve. The title Clear Spot was embossed on the front, with the record clearly visible inside without a liner. This reflected the title: a clear cover with the black vinyl disc as a visible spot. The original concept was for the disc to be of clear vinyl, but this was abandoned due to financial constraints. The album did eventually see a clear vinyl release for its 50th anniversary reissue in 2022.

The package also included a white card insert, with the band name and credits. For the UK this was a single weight card, but in the US issues this was back-to-back card with rounded corners at the bottom. The printed insert shows a photo of Beefheart and band members in the control center of the Planetarium of Griffith Park Observatory, Los Angeles, California. Griffith Park and the neighboring Los Angeles Zoo had inspired the young Beefheart (born Don Glen Vliet).

For vinyl LP reissues a more traditional black-on-white printed sleeve was employed.

On CD, the album was issued on a single disc with its predecessor The Spotlight Kid, giving an overview of the work created when the band resided in Felton (near Santa Cruz, California) and Trinidad in Humboldt County. Separately, the two albums are only available as vinyl LP reissues.

In 2015, Rhino Records remastered and re-released this album, along with The Spotlight Kid, The Spotlight Kid Outtakes, and Lick My Decals Off, Baby in a 4xCD compilation titled Sun Zoom Spark, rendering these albums available after being out of print for many years.

In 2022, a double LP 50th anniversary edition of the album was released by Rhino Entertainment, for Record Store Day 2022. The second LP contains studio outtakes, alternative versions and previously unreleased instrumental rough mixes from the Clear Spot sessions.

== Commercial performance ==
Clear Spot reached No. 191 on the U.S. Billboard 200 chart. It did not chart in the U.K.

== Reception and appearances ==
Professional ratings
Review scores
Source	Rating
AllMusic	4/5 stars
Christgau's Record Guide	B+
The Encyclopedia of Popular Music	4/5 stars
The Rolling Stone Record Guide	4/5 stars

In March 2005, Q placed "Big Eyed Beans from Venus" at number 53 in its list of the 100 Greatest Guitar Tracks. "Her Eyes Are a Blue Million Miles" was featured on the soundtrack of the 1998 film The Big Lebowski, and was later covered by the Black Keys. The title track has been covered by Painted Willie and by Mark Lanegan. Joan Osborne recorded "His Eyes Are a Blue Million Miles", heard on her compilation Early Recordings; her 1996 single "Right Hand Man" (from the 1995 album Relish) gives a co-writing credit to Don Van Vliet due to the guitar hook's similarity to the intro to "Clear Spot". The Tubes released a faithful cover of "My Head Is My Only House Unless It Rains" on their 3rd LP, Now, in 1977. Everything but the Girl also recorded the same song.

It was voted number 126 in Colin Larkin's All Time Top 1000 Albums 3rd Edition (2000).

== Track listing ==
All tracks are written by Don Van Vliet and arranged by Bill Harkleroad.

Side one
No.	Title	Length
1.	"Low Yo Yo Stuff"	3:41
2.	"Nowadays a Woman's Gotta Hit a Man"	3:46
3.	"Too Much Time"	2:50
4.	"Circumstances"	3:14
5.	"My Head Is My Only House Unless It Rains"	2:55
6.	"Sun Zoom Spark"	2:13

Side two
No.	Title	Length
1.	"Clear Spot"	3:40
2.	"Crazy Little Thing"	2:38
3.	"Long Neck Bottles"	3:18
4.	"Her Eyes Are a Blue Million Miles"	2:57
5.	"Big Eyed Beans from Venus"	4:23
6.	"Golden Birdies"	1:36

== Personnel ==
Captain Beefheart and the Magic Band

- Captain Beefheart (Don Van Vliet) – vocals, harmonica, "wings on Singabus" (apparently referring to the flapping noise heard when he says the word Singabus, in "Golden Birdies"), horn arrangements (2, 9)
- Zoot Horn Rollo (Bill Harkleroad) – lead guitar, slide guitar, mandolin
- Rockette Morton (Mark Boston) – rhythm guitar, bass (on "Golden Birdies")
- Oréjon (Roy Estrada) – bass
- Ed Marimba (Art Tripp) – drums, percussion

Additional musicians

- The Blackberries – backing vocals ("Too Much Time", "Crazy Little Thing")
- Russ Titelman – guitar ("Too Much Time")
- Milt Holland – additional percussion
- Ted Templeman and Don Van Vliet ("Nowadays a Woman's Gotta Hit a Man", "Long Neck Bottles"), Jerry Jumonville ("Too Much Time") – horn arrangement
