= Harkleroad =

Harkleroad is a surname. Notable people with the surname include:

- Ashley Harkleroad (born 1985), American tennis player
- Bill Harkleroad (born 1949), American guitarist
- Bunky Harkleroad, basketball coach
