= Rockette Morton =

American musician

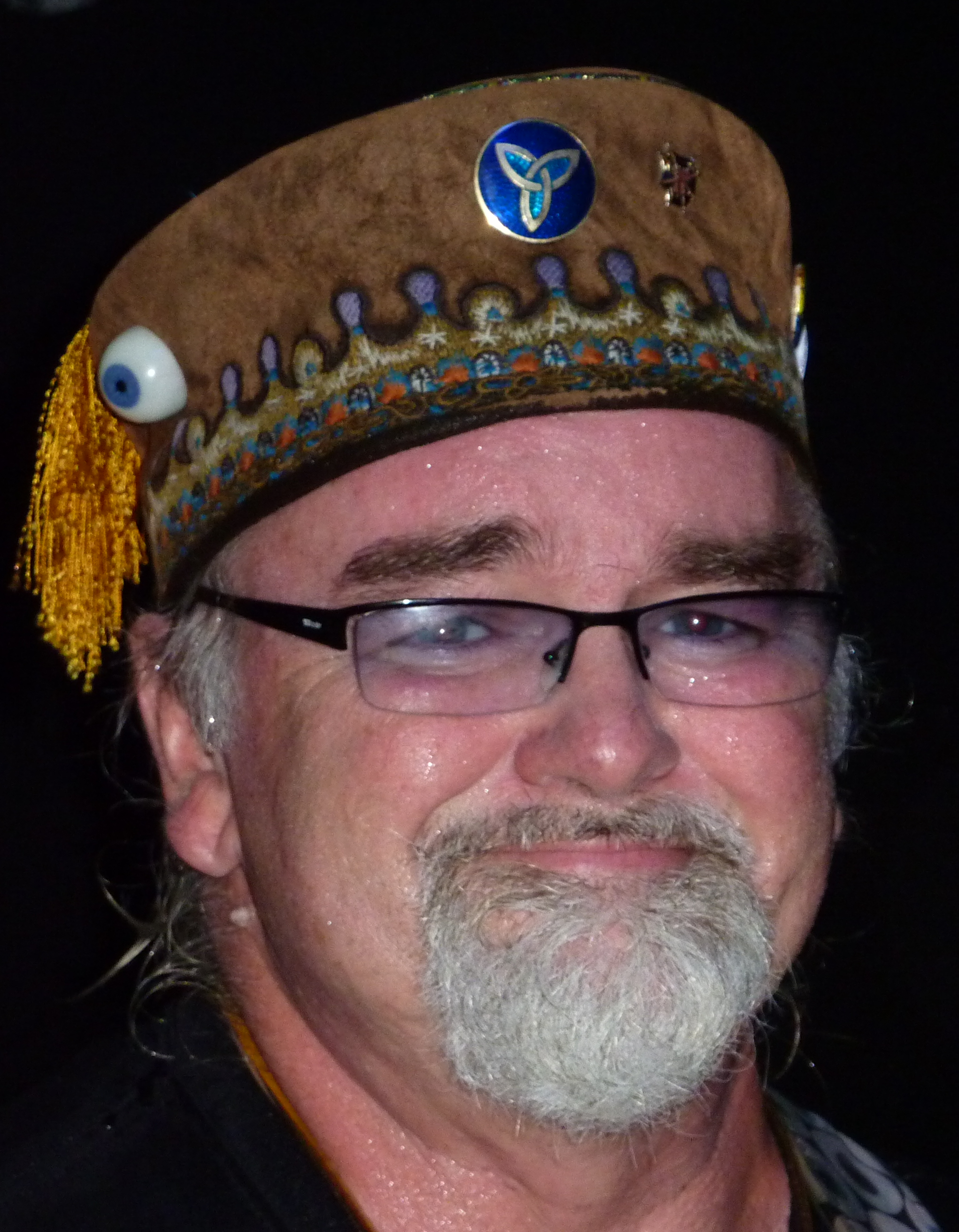
- Rockette Morton on stage at the Zanzibar Club in Liverpool. September 29, 2012

Background information
- Born: Mark Boston; July 14, 1949 (age 77); Salem, Illinois, U.S.
- Genres: Rock, alternative rock
- Occupation: Musician
- Instruments: Bass, guitar, keyboard, backing vocals
- Years active: 1963–present
- Website: rockettemorton.com

Rockette Morton (born Mark Boston; July 14, 1949 in Salem, Illinois) is an American musician, best known as a bassist and guitarist for Captain Beefheart and the Magic Band in the 1960s and 1970s.

== Career ==
In 1963, after moving to Lancaster, California, Boston joined up with future Magic Band member Bill Harkleroad (aka Zoot Horn Rollo) in a band named B.C. & the Cavemen.

He was given the nickname "Rockette Morton" by Captain Beefheart after becoming a member of the Magic Band. Morton played on five of Beefheart's albums: Trout Mask Replica (produced by Frank Zappa in 1969), Lick My Decals Off Baby (1970), The Spotlight Kid (1972), Clear Spot (1972) and Unconditionally Guaranteed (1974). He originally played bass guitar, but switched to rhythm guitar after bassist Roy Estrada joined the band.

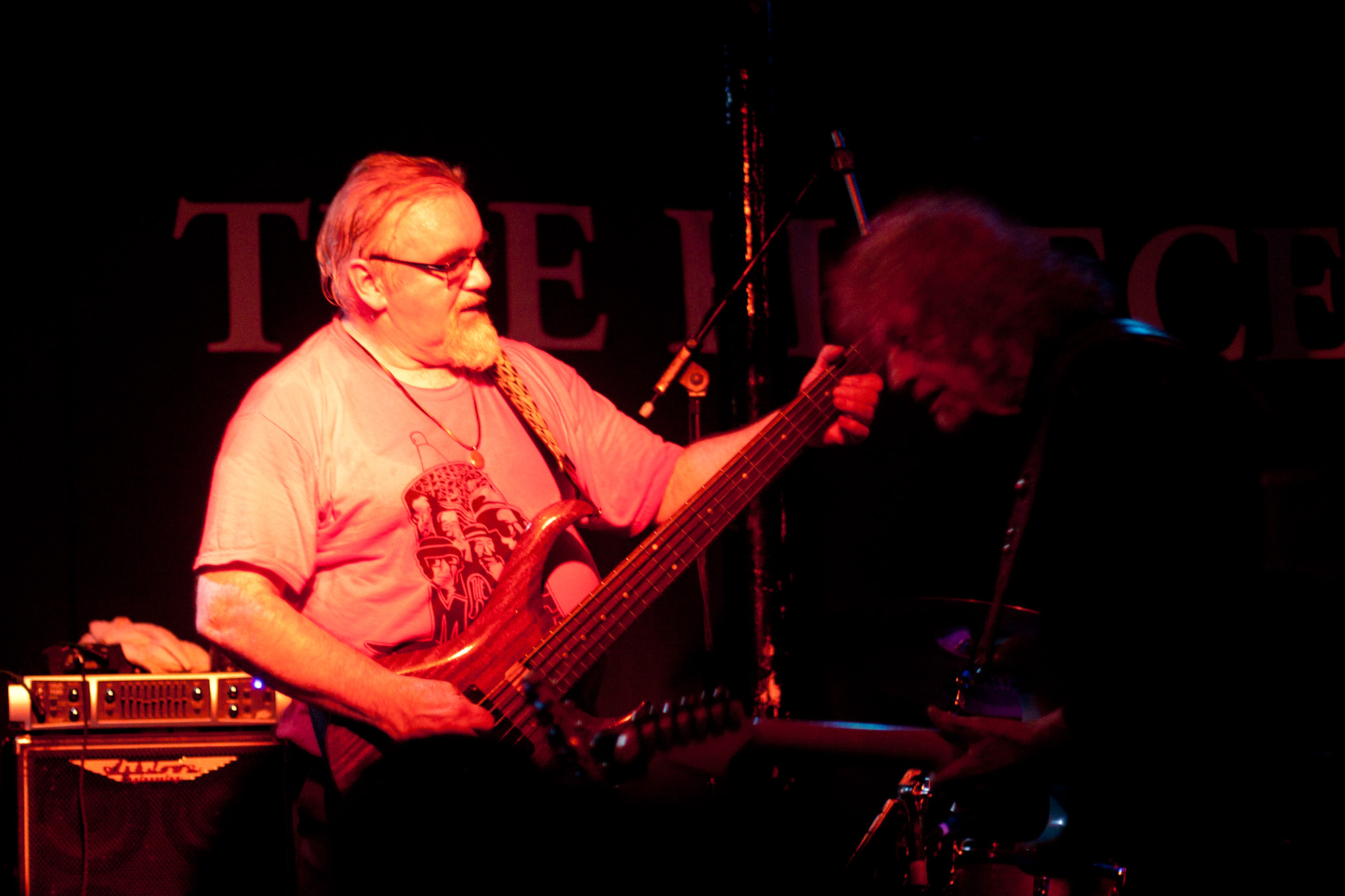
Rockette Morton and Denny Walley AKA Feelers Rebo at The Fleece, Bristol, in 2013

In the book Lunar Notes: Zoot Horn Rollo's Captain Beefheart Experience, guitarist Bill Harkleroad details some of the tensions that arose between Beefheart and members of the band. These tensions led to a split in 1974, when Rockette Morton left to form Mallard with bandmates John French, Bill Harkleroad, and Art Tripp. Mallard released two albums, Mallard (1975) and In A Different Climate (1976). Following the band's demise, Morton continued performing in various groups as guitarist and bassist.

Morton released a solo album, Love Space, in 2003, about which he wrote: "If you enjoy listening to this music even half as much as I enjoyed recording it, I did my job." It was recorded at his music studio in Aiken, South Carolina.

Prior to the album's release he was featured in an article in the music magazine Stomp & Stammer (October 2002), titled "The Ring of Rockette Morton", in which he self-identified as "a space nut" and being "pro-space". He was 52 years old at the time and was living in a mobile home, decorated with alien and rocket ship models.

In 2003 Morton and other former members of the Magic Band regrouped and embarked on a world tour, performing Captain Beefheart's music. They continued to tour regularly as the Magic Band until 2017.

In 2026, following Morton's poor health history, including heart bypass surgery, a stroke, diabetes and bladder cancer, a trust was set up to assist with his living arrangements.

== Discography ==
=== Captain Beefheart and the Magic Band ===
- Trout Mask Replica (1969)
- Lick My Decals Off, Baby (1970)
- The Spotlight Kid (1972)
- Clear Spot (1972)
- Unconditionally Guaranteed (1974)

=== Mallard ===
- Mallard
- In a Different Climate

=== Solo ===
- Love Space (2003)

=== Guest appearances ===
- Ant-Bee: Electronic Church Muzik (Barking Moondog, 2011)
