= Jeff Cotton =

American rock guitarist (born 1948)

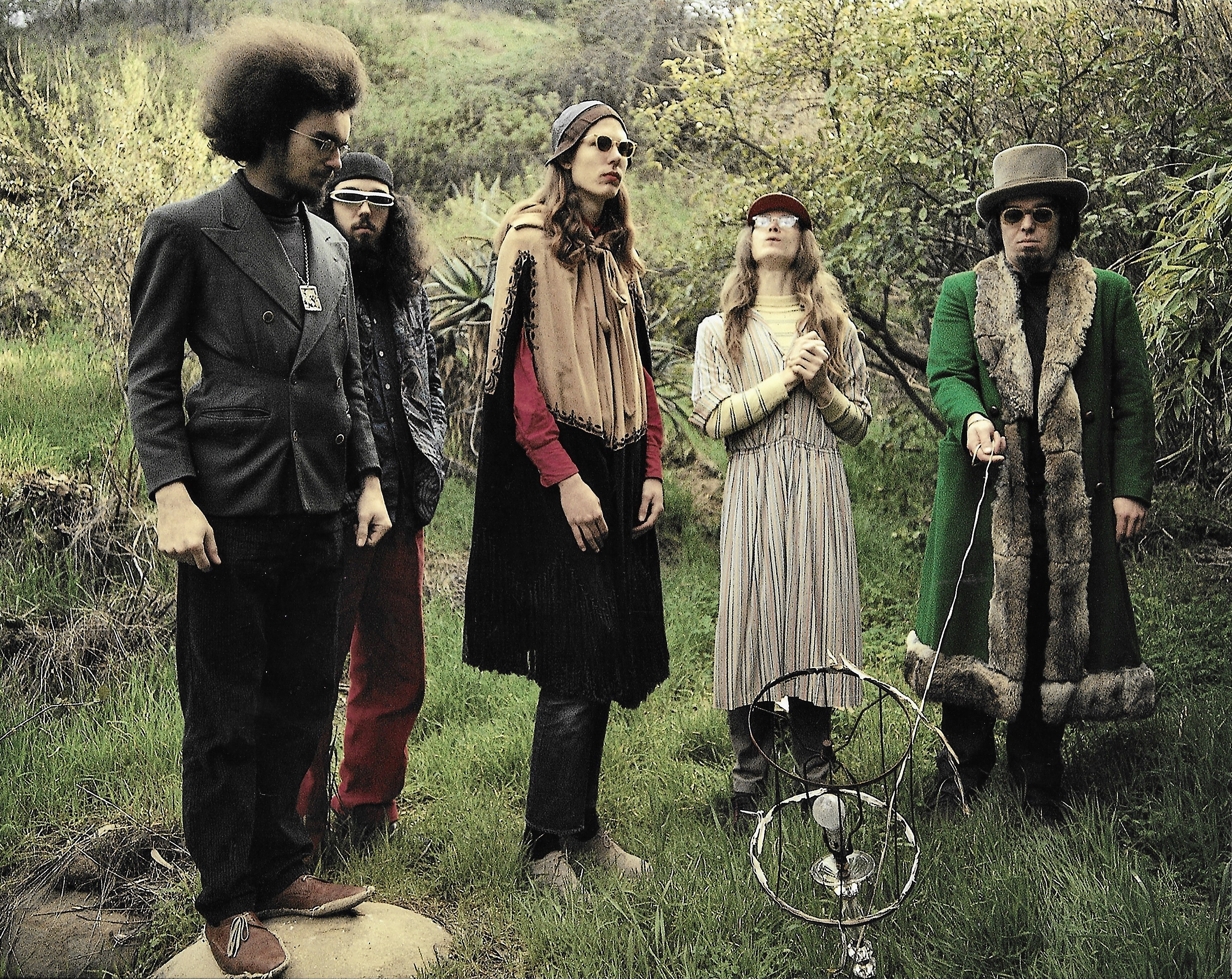

Background information
- Born: Jeffrey Ralph Cotton; May 31, 1948 (age 78); Porterville, California, Tulare County, United States
- Genres: Jazz fusion, experimental, Rock, ballads, instrumentals,
- Occupations: Singer, songwriter, Musician
- Instruments: Electric guitar, electric bass, bottleneck guitar, vocals, Bass clarinet, Soprano sax and keys.
- Years active: Active since 1964 to present.

Jeffrey Ralph Cotton (born May 31, 1948) is an American rock guitarist, known for his work as a member of Captain Beefheart and his Magic Band under the alias "Antennae Jimmy Semen's".

== Career ==
Jeff Cotton first came to attention as guitarist with Merrell and the Exiles, who had a few local hits in 1964 in the Los Angeles area. He subsequently joined Blues in a Bottle, which also featured future Magic Band members Mark Boston, Bill Harkleroad and John French. He was recruited into the Magic Band in 1967 as a replacement for Ry Cooder.

Jeff contributed unique and challenging bottleneck guitar to live performances, Strictly Personal, Mirror Man and Trout Mask Replica; for which he was credited as Antennae Jimmy Semens. He left the Magic Band in 1970 after being attacked by temporary and insane drummer Jeff Burchell during a group "talk" and having ribs broken, and having experienced the reclusive 8 months of rehearsals for Trout Mask Replica during which Beefheart experimented on the group members with sleep deprivation, food deprivation, and physical violence in an attempt to break their mental state down.

He renewed his professional relationship with Merrell Fankhauser (of The Exiles) in a band called MU. Despite a critically acclaimed album, there was no commercial success, and he retired from the music business in 1975 to study Christian Ministry. In 1981, long after the group had disbanded, a second LP of unreleased MU material was issued.

In 2022 a 50 year recording hiatus ended with his first solo album, The Fantasy of Reality.

== Personal life ==
He has three children.

== Discography ==
=== With Captain Beefheart & His Magic Band ===
==== Studio albums ====
Year	Title	Notes	Magic Band personnel
1968	Strictly Personal	Released in October 1968; Label: Blue Thumb (US), Liberty (UK)	John French; Alex St. Clair; Jeff Cotton; Jerry Handley
1969	Trout Mask Replica	Released on June 16, 1969; Label: Straight	John French; Jeff Cotton; Bill Harkleroad; Mark Boston; Victor Hayden
1971	Mirror Man	Released in April 1971 (recorded 1967); Label: Buddah	John French; Alex St. Clair; Jeff Cotton; Jerry Handley

=== With MU ===
- MU (1971)
- The Last Album (1974, released 1981)
- Children of the Rainbow (1974, released 1985)

=== Solo ===
- The Fantasy of Reality (2022)
