= Unconditionally Guaranteed =

Studio album by Captain Beefheart and the Magic Band
- Released: April 1974
- Recorded: 1974
- Studio: Hollywood Sound
- Length: 31:14
- Label: Mercury (US), Virgin (UK)
- Producer: Andy DiMartino

Captain Beefheart and the Magic Band chronology
Clear Spot (1972)	Unconditionally Guaranteed (1974)	Bluejeans & Moonbeams (1974)

Professional ratings
Review scores
Source	Rating
AllMusic	2/5 stars
Christgau's Record Guide	B−
The Rolling Stone Album Guide	2.5/5 stars
Sounds	(mixed)

Unconditionally Guaranteed is the eighth LP by Captain Beefheart and the Magic Band, released in 1974. It was recorded at Hollywood Sound, Los Angeles.

Upon release it was criticised for being too commercial; even so, it failed to give Beefheart any real chart success, peaking at No. 192 on the Billboard Top 200.

== Aftermath ==
Immediately after recording of the album the entire Magic Band quit – as biographer Mike Barnes has stated, "[Beefheart] was in effect sacked by his own group." They had become increasingly disenchanted with the lack of financial success, having subsisted on food stamps and donations from their parents, and with Beefheart's tyrannical control over the group. In the words of guitarist Bill Harkleroad "we had had enough of him treating us like punching bags."

The album's lackluster and unchallenging music was the last straw. Drummer Art Tripp recalled, "When the band finally got our album copies, we were horrified. As we listened, it was as though each song was worse than the one which preceded it."

After his contract with Mercury Records ended at the end of 1974, Beefheart disowned the record along with its successor Bluejeans & Moonbeams. He urged his fans to "take copies back for a refund" and called the albums "horrible and vulgar".

== Track listing ==
All tracks are written by Don and Jan Van Vliet and Andy DiMartino.

Side A
No.	Title	Length
1.	"Upon the My-O-My"	2:43
2.	"Sugar Bowl"	2:13
3.	"New Electric Ride"	3:02
4.	"Magic Be"	2:55
5.	"Happy Love Song"	3:54

Side B
No.	Title	Length
6.	"Full Moon, Hot Sun"	2:19
7.	"I Got Love on My Mind"	3:08
8.	"This Is the Day"	4:51
9.	"Lazy Music"	2:49
10.	"Peaches"	3:20

== Personnel ==
- Captain Beefheart (Don Van Vliet) – vocals, harmonica
- Alex St. Clair – guitar
- Zoot Horn Rollo (Bill Harkleroad) – guitar, glass finger guitar
- Rockette Morton (Mark Boston) – bass
- Art Tripp – drums, percussion

Additional personnel

- Mark Marcellino – keyboards
- Andy DiMartino – acoustic guitar
- Del Simmons – tenor saxophone, flute
