= Art Tripp =

American drummer

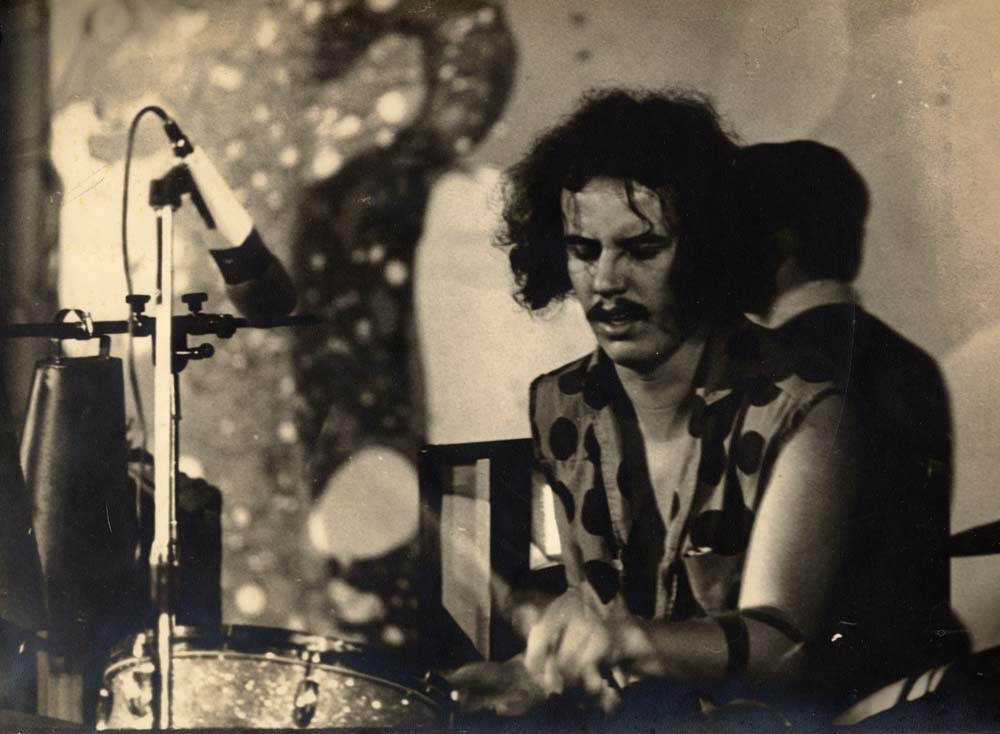
- Art Tripp in Chicago in 1968

Background information
- Also known as: Ed Marimba; Ted Cactus; Artie "With the Green Mustache" Tripp
- Born: Arthur Dyer Tripp III; September 10, 1944 (age 82)
- Genres: Rock; jazz; classical; avant-garde
- Instruments: Drums, marimba, percussion, piano
- Years active: 1959–1978
- Website: www.arthurtrippdc.com

Arthur Dyer Tripp III (born September 10, 1944) is an American retired musician who is best known for his work as a percussionist with Frank Zappa's band the Mothers of Invention during the 1960s and with Captain Beefheart's Magic Band in the 1970s. Thereafter, Tripp retired from music and became a chiropractor in Gulfport, Mississippi.

== Early career ==
Arthur Dyer Tripp III was born September 10, 1944, in Athens, Ohio. He grew up in Pittsburgh, Pennsylvania. He started playing drums in fourth grade with school bands, then later while at high school at weddings, fraternity parties and dances. In the mid-1950s he studied drums with Pittsburgh jazz drummer Al Hammond. In 1959, he became a student of Stanley Leonard, a timpanist with the Pittsburgh Symphony Orchestra, with whom he learned to play classical percussion.

In 1962, Tripp enrolled at the Cincinnati College Conservatory of Music to study percussion. His private teacher at the conservatory, Ed Weubold, was a percussionist with the Cincinnati Symphony Orchestra (CSO). Tripp became a regular member of the CSO, performing with artists such as Igor Stravinsky, Isaac Stern, Leonard Rose, José Iturbi, Loren Hollender, and Arthur Fiedler. In 1966, the United States Department of State sent the orchestra on a ten-week world tour, which provided additional experience for the young musician. During this time, Tripp also played two seasons as timpanist with the Dayton Philharmonic Orchestra, as well two seasons with both the Cincinnati Summer Opera and the Cincinnati Pops Orchestra. He was selected by John Cage to work with him in performances and workshops when Cage became composer-in-residence at the conservatory.

Tripp graduated from the conservatory in 1966 with a Bachelor of Music degree; his degree recital featured one of the first North American performances of Karlheinz Stockhausen's Zyklus. In 1967, accepted a scholarship to the Manhattan School of Music, primarily in order to finish a Master of Music degree, but also to expose himself further to contemporary music. His teacher was a former timpanist with the Philadelphia Orchestra, Fred Hinger. Hinger was at that time performing with the Metropolitan Opera Orchestra as well as teaching there.

== Later career ==
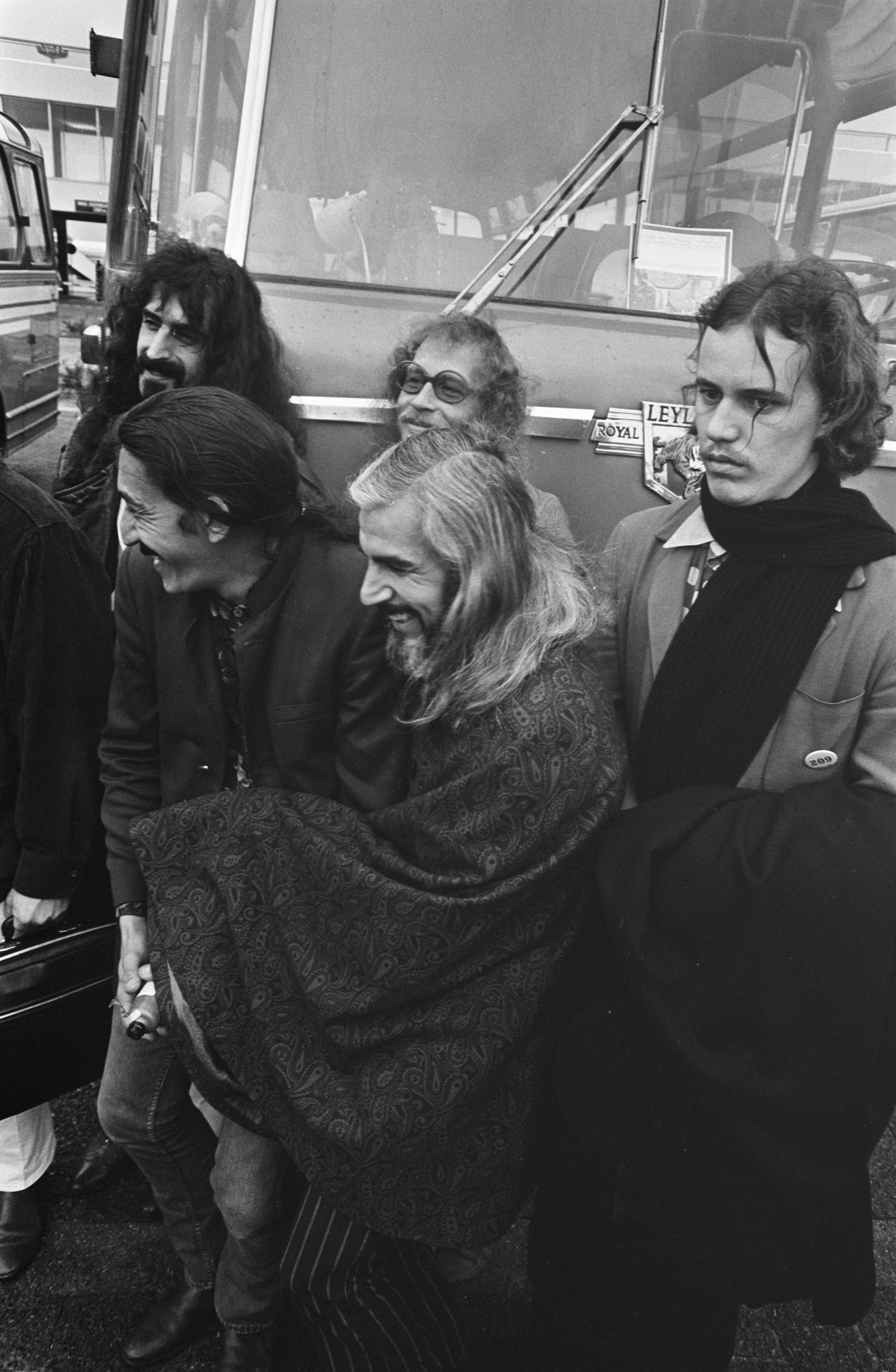
Tripp (right) with Zappa & The Mothers of Invention (1968)

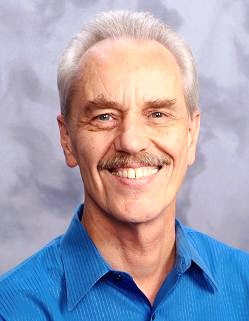
Art Tripp in 2013

It was in New York that Tripp was introduced to Frank Zappa’s recording engineer, Richard Kunc. Kunc told Zappa about Tripp, who, he said, had the type of background and experience he thought Zappa was looking for. Tripp met Zappa and played for him at Apostolic Recording Studio in New York's Greenwich Village. Tripp was soon hired to play with The Mothers of Invention and went on to record seven albums and perform numerous tours throughout the US and Europe. In early 1968, the band left New York after an 18-month stay and relocated to Hollywood. A year later, Zappa disbanded the Mothers to pursue a solo career. Tripp appears on two albums compiled from recordings made before the dissolution of the Mothers of Invention: Burnt Weeny Sandwich and Weasels Ripped My Flesh, both released in 1970.

Meanwhile, Tripp had been discussing projects with occasional Zappa collaborator and long-time friend Don Van Vliet (a.k.a. Captain Beefheart). He would later join Beefheart's group the Magic Band. At that time, he also recorded with Chad Stuart and Tarantula, played percussion on the Smothers Brothers Summer Special, and was offered a position in the pit orchestra for the stage show Oh! Calcutta!.

Tripp decided to move to northern California with the Magic Band. The move heralded a five-year period of recording and touring again throughout the US and Europe. During the same period he was asked, but declined due to his commitment with Beefheart, to do session work with former Magic Band member Ry Cooder and saxophonist Ornette Coleman. Eventually, conflicts with Beefheart meant the rest of the Magic Band split off to compose and rehearse new music that was recorded on an album sponsored by the Jethro Tull organization, along with its drummer Barriemore Barlow and guitarist Martin Barre, called Mallard. However, by then Tripp had become dissatisfied with music. He returned to Pittsburgh to work in the insurance business with his father.

After three years, realizing that selling insurance was not something he wanted to do either, Tripp decided to return to music. He went back to Los Angeles where he stayed with former Mothers bandmate Ian Underwood and Ruth Underwood, who also played extensively with Zappa, while he worked as a studio musician recording with artists such as Al Stewart and various commercial producers. However, studio work proved to lack the allure of live performance and he once again lost interest in pursuing his career in music.

After leaving music, Tripp became a chiropractor, graduating from Cleveland University-Kansas City and practices in Mississippi as of 2024.

== Discography ==
=== Frank Zappa/The Mothers of Invention ===
- Cruising with Ruben & the Jets (1968, LP, Verve)
- Uncle Meat (1969, 2LP, Bizarre)
- Burnt Weeny Sandwich (1970, LP, Bizarre)
- Weasels Ripped My Flesh (1970, LP, Bizarre)
- You Can't Do That on Stage Anymore, Vol. 1 (1988, 2CD, Rykodisc)
- You Can't Do That on Stage Anymore, Vol. 4 (1991, 2CD, Rykodisc)
- The Ark (1991, CD, Rhino Foo-eee Records, R2 70538)
- Electric Aunt Jemima (1991, CD, USA, Rhino Foo-eee Records R2 71019)
- Our Man In Nirvana (1991, CD, USA, Rhino Foo-eee Records R2 71022)
- You Can't Do That on Stage Anymore, Vol. 5 (1992, 2CD, Rykodisc)
- Ahead Of Their Time (1993, CD, Rykodisc)
- The Lost Episodes (1996, CD, Rykodisc)
- Mystery Discs (1998, CD, Rykodisc)
- Road Tapes – Kerrisdale Arena, Vancouver BC, 25 August 1968 (2012, CD, USA, Vaulternative Records )
- Finer Moments (2012, CD, USA, Zappa Records)
- Wollman Rink, Central Park, NY, August 3, 1968 (2014, CD, UK, Keyhole Records)
- Meat Light (2016, 3CD, USA, Zappa Records)

=== Captain Beefheart and The Magic Band ===
- Lick My Decals Off, Baby (1970, LP, Straight)
- The Spotlight Kid (1972, LP, Reprise)
- Clear Spot (1972, LP, Reprise)
- Unconditionally Guaranteed (1974, LP, Mercury)
- Shiny Beast (Bat Chain Puller) (1978, LP, Warner)
- Grow Fins (1999, 5CD, Revenant Records)
- Grow Fins Vol. III: Grow Fins (2001, 2lp, USA, Xeric)
- Railroadism (2003, CD, UK, Viper cd 015)
- Live at Bickershaw Festival (2007, cd, UK, ozitcd9006)
- Translucent Fresnel – Live 72/73 – The Nans True's Hole Tapes (2011, 2lp, UK, Ozit Dandelion Records LP 8008)
- Live From Vancouver 1973 (2014, CD, UK, Gonzo gzo106cd)
- Rough, Raw and Zmazing (2015, 2lp, UK, Ozit Records) – "Record Store Day 2015" release. Limited edition on yellow vinyl

=== Others ===
- Tarantula: Tarantula (1968, LP, A&M)
- Wild Man Fischer: An Evening With Wild Man Fischer (1969, LP, Bizarre/Reprise)
- Jean-Luc Ponty: King Kong (1970, LP, World Pacific Jazz ST20172)
- Smothers Brothers: The Smothers Brothers Summer Show (1970, TV, ABC)
- Mallard: Mallard (1975, LP, Virgin Records V2045)
- Al Stewart: Time Passages (1978, LP, Arista)
- Jefferson Airplane: Loves You (1992, 3CD, RCA)
- Tim Buckley: Live at the Troubadour 1969 (1994, CD, French, Edsel Records)
- Jefferson Airplane: Crown of Creation (2003, EU, CD, RCA)

== Filmography ==
- Uncle Meat (1987)
- The True Story of Frank Zappa's 200 Motels (1989)
- The Big Lebowski (1998) soundtrack "Her Eyes Are A Blue Million Miles" (1972) Captain Beefheart
- Frank Zappa and the Mothers of Invention: In the 1960s (2009)

== Interviews ==
- ZappaCast #67 - Ladies and Gentleman...Arthur Dyer Tripp, III !!!, May 18, 2024, Interview by Joe Travers, Scott Parker, and Bill Camarata. https://www.zappa.com/zappacast-67-ladies-and-gentlemen-arthur-dyer-tripp-iii/#/
- Art Tripp & Zoot Horn Rollo - The ProgCast with Gregg Bendian (November, 2023) https://www.youtube.com/watch?v=0or3j8nU4M4&t=272s
- Zappanale Festival interview, July 17, 2022, https://www.facebook.com/rockradio.de/videos/611303310305401
- Interview by Andrew Greenaway, May 5, 2022, https://www.zappanews.co.uk/interviews/art-tripp
- YouTube interview by composer Samuel Andreyev, April 24, 2020, https://www.youtube.com/watch?v=ugMep20elgQ&list=PLPyqt9rE6s4tPOITHvQn9F8Ly_TMvZAaU&index=28
- YouTube interview by Prism Films, June 26, 2012, 14 parts, https://www.youtube.com/watch?v=B4WtWZaG--U
- Frank Zappa and the Mothers of Invention In The 1960s, DVD Video SIDVD545, 2008
- Radio Interview, February 6, 2010, https://web.archive.org/web/20090907173741/http://woub.org/radio/index.php?section=4&page=19
