= Gary Marker =

American Musician (1943-2015)

Gary "Magic" Marker (May 23, 1943 – December 8, 2015) was an American bass guitarist and recording engineer, best known for his involvement in various psychedelic rock bands of the 1960s.

A bass player with jazz leanings, who had studied at Berklee College of Music, Marker was a member of the Rising Sons between 1964 and 1966, along with Ry Cooder and Taj Mahal. A 1992 retrospective CD was issued of their work, Rising Sons on Columbia CK 52828.

During this time he became friendly with Don Vliet, alias Captain Beefheart. He helped with Vliet's musical education and played with Beefheart and the Magic Band on a number of occasions but was unwilling to kowtow to the large Beefheart ego on a regular basis. Marker was involved in the early production work on Safe as Milk, but this material did not feature on the final issue. The archived track is part of the "Brown Wrapper" project. He stood in for Jerry Handley on bass at live shows during 1964–67 and joined the Magic Band for a short spell in 1968–69 ("Moonlight On Vermont" and "Veteran's Day Poppy" from Trout Mask Replica are the only two surviving tracks which feature his bass playing; a third track, a reworking of 'Kandy Korn', has disappeared).

Two other bands of his, the Jazz Folk and the New World Jazz Company (which also included John Locke, Randy California and Ed Cassidy before moving on to form Spirit), were never recorded. His band Fusion recorded a 1969 album entitled Border Town which featured Ry Cooder.

In 1978, he featured on an album by Juicy Groove, alongside vocalist Michael Rainbow Neal (ex-Seeds), guitarists Mars Bonfire (ex-Steppenwolf), Elliot Ingber (ex-Mothers of Invention and Magic Band) and drummer Thundercloud, son of former bandmate Ed Cassidy.

He played in numerous bands (and with many performers) over the years, and was a regular session musician as well working as an engineer/producer. He retired from the music business but maintained an active interest (especially in Beefheart-related matters) until his death at the age of 72 on December 8, 2015, from a stroke.
