= Zoot Horn Rollo =

Musical artist (born 1949)

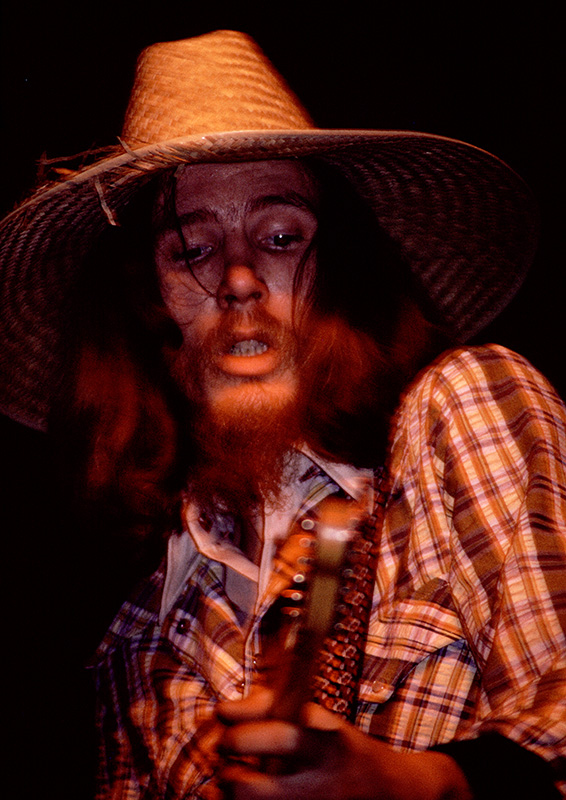
- With Captain Beefheart and his Magic Band; Leeds University May 1973; Photo: Alastair Thompson

Background information
- Also known as: Zoot Horn Rollo
- Born: Bill Harkleroad; January 8, 1949 (age 77); Palmdale, California, United States
- Genres: Experimental rock, rock, blues
- Occupations: Musician, instructor, producer
- Instruments: Guitar, mandolin, accordion
- Years active: 1968–present
- Labels: Straight, Reprise, Proper
- Website: www.zoothornrollo.com

Bill Harkleroad (born January 8, 1949), known professionally as Zoot Horn Rollo, is an American guitarist. He is best known for his work with Captain Beefheart and The Magic Band. In 2003, he was ranked No. 62 in a Rolling Stone magazine list of "the 100 greatest guitarists of all time".

== Early life ==
Born in Hawthorne, California, Harkleroad was trained as an accordionist as a child but changed to guitar in his teens.

== Career ==
In nearby Lancaster, California, he became involved in local bands. With a future member of the Magic Band, Mark Boston, he joined a band named B.C. & The Cavemen (with Ernie Wood, vocals/guitar and Bruce Newkirk, drums). The two later played in the group Blues in a Bottle along with the future Magic Band guitarist Jeff Cotton. He joined the Magic Band in 1968 after the departure of Alex St. Clair. In March 2005, Q placed "Big Eyed Beans from Venus" from Clear Spot at number 53 in its list of the 100 Greatest Guitar Tracks.

After recording Trout Mask Replica and several further albums, he left in 1974, with several other band members, to form Mallard. His book, Lunar Notes, describes some of the tensions that contributed to the split between Captain Beefheart and the other band members.

After the break-up of Mallard, Harkleroad had a limited involvement with the music community as a performer. He continued his involvement in another capacity, however, as a record store manager and guitar instructor in Eugene, Oregon.

On November 27, 2001, he released We Saw a Bozo Under the Sea. In 2008, John French (a.k.a. Drumbo) released an album City of Refuge on which Harkleroad played guitar on all twelve tracks.

In 2003, he was ranked No. 62 in a Rolling Stone magazine list of "the 100 greatest guitarists of all time".

In 2013, Harkleroad contributed lead guitar to a psychobilly track on the Eugene-based band Cherry Poppin' Daddies' album White Teeth, Black Thoughts.

== Discography ==
=== With Captain Beefheart & His Magic Band ===
==== Studio albums ====
Year	Title	Notes	Magic Band personnel
1969	Trout Mask Replica	Released on June 16, 1969; Label: Straight	John French; Jeff Cotton; Bill Harkleroad; Mark Boston; Victor Hayden
1970	Lick My Decals Off, Baby	Released in December 1970; Label: Straight	John French; Bill Harkleroad; Mark Boston; Art Tripp
1972	The Spotlight Kid	Released in January 1972; Label: Reprise	John French; Bill Harkleroad; Mark Boston; Art Tripp; Elliot Ingber
1972	Clear Spot	Released in October 1972; Label: Reprise	Bill Harkleroad; Mark Boston; Art Tripp; Roy Estrada
1974	Unconditionally Guaranteed	Released in April 1974; Label: Mercury (US), Virgin (UK)	Bill Harkleroad; Mark Boston; Alex St. Clair; Mark Marcellino; Art Tripp

==== Singles ====
Year	Single	Album
1970	"Pachuco Cadaver" / "Wild Life"	Trout Mask Replica
1972	"Too Much Time" / "My Head Is My Only House Unless It Rains"	Clear Spot
1974	"Upon the My-O-My" / "Magic Be"	Unconditionally Guaranteed

=== With Mallard ===
- 1975 Mallard
- 1976 In a Different Climate

=== Solo ===
- 2001 We Saw a Bozo Under the Sea
- 2014 Masks

== Bibliography ==
- Harkleroad, Bill (1998). Lunar Notes: Zoot Horn Rollo's Captain Beefheart Experience. Interlink Publishing. ISBN 0-946719-21-7.
