= Mallard (album) =

Studio album by Mallard
- Released: 1975
- Recorded: 1974–1975, Maison Rouge Mobile Recording (Devonshire)
- Genre: Art rock; country rock; boogie rock; country blues
- Label: Virgin
- Producer: Robin Black, Bill Harkleroad

Mallard chronology
Mallard (1975)	In a Different Climate (1976)

Professional ratings
Mallard/In a Different Climate
Review scores
Source	Rating
AllMusic	3/5 stars
Christgau's Record Guide	B

Mallard is the debut by the group Mallard, who formed after tensions between them and Captain Beefheart exploded, causing them to leave his band (though the album's last track is a Beefheart composition). It was reissued as a CD with the band's other album, In a Different Climate, added on.

Mallard got their start with the help of Jethro Tull's Ian Anderson: he lent them his mobile studio for their work (he is thanked in the liner notes). Neither album achieved any sort of commercial success.

== Track listing Mallard album ==
- All songs copyright Virgin Music Publishers Ltd. (except where noted)

=== LP Side one ===
1. "Back On The Pavement" (Lyrics: David Wagstaff; Music: Bill Harkleroad) 3:09
2. "She's Long and She's Lean" (Lyrics: Ted Alvy; Music: Bill Harkleroad, Mark Boston) 3:15
3. "Road to Morrocco" — instrumental (Music: Bill Harkleroad, Mark Boston) 2:58
4. "One Day Once" (Lyrics: John French; Music: Bill Harkleroad) 3:25
5. "Yellow" — instrumental (Music: Bill Harkleroad) 2:22
6. "Desperados Waiting for a Train" (Music and Lyrics: Guy Clark; Arr. Jim Dickinson) 3:30

=== LP Side two ===
1. "A Piece of Me" (Lyrics: Bill Harkleroad, John French; Music: Bill Harkleroad) 4:36
2. "Reign of Pain" (Lyrics: Dan Moore; Music: Bill Harkleroad, John French) 3:03
3. "South of The Valley" (Music and Lyrics: John French; Arr. Bill Harkleroad) 4:48
4. "Winged Tuskadero" (Lyrics: David Wagstaff; Music: Bill Harkleroad) 3:18
5. "Peon" — instrumental (Don Van Vliet aka Captain Beefheart; Copyright Kama Sutra Music Ltd.) 3:26

== Track listing In A Different Climate ==
- (P) 1976 Virgin Records Ltd.
- Produced by Robert John Lange (Released 1977 in USA via CBS Records)

=== LP Side one ===
1. "Green Coyote" (4:15) L: David Wagstaff M: Bill Harkleroad/Mark Boston
2. "Your Face On Someone Else" (4:30) David Wagstaff /Bill Harkleroad/John Thomas
3. "Harvest" (3:40) L: David Wagstaff M: John Thomas
4. "Mama Squeeze" (4:04) L: Ted Alvy/Bill Harkleroad M: Bill Harkleroad

=== LP Side two ===
1. "Heartstrings" - instrumental (8:08) Bill Harkleroad/John Thomas
2. "Old Man Grey" LM: Mark Boston segues
3. "Texas Weather" (4:32) L: Ted Alvy M: Bill Harkleroad
4. "Big Foot" (4:39) L: Ted Alvy/Bill Harkleroad M: Bill Harkleroad
- In 1994, both LPs by Mallard were re-released on CD by Virgin Records in the UK and in the USA.

== Personnel ==
=== Mallard ===
- Sam Galpin: vocals, piano on "Desperados Waiting For A Train"
- Bill Harkleroad: electric and acoustic guitars
- Mark Boston: bass, vocals on "Winged Tuskadero"
- Art Tripp III: drums, percussion, marimba
  - plus Barry Morgan: Latin percussion on "Reign Of Pain"
  - Rabbit Bundrick: Fender Rhodes on "One Day Once", "A Piece Of Me" and "Reign Of Pain"

=== In A Different Climate ===
- Sam Galpin: vocals
- Bill Harkleroad: guitars
- Mark Boston: bass guitar, dobro (vocals on "Old Man Grey")
- John Thomas: keyboards and backing vocals
- George Draggota: drums
  - plus John McFee: pedal steel guitar on "Harvest"

== Production ==
- Produced by Robin Black and Bill Harkleroad
- Recorded, engineered and mixed By Robin Black; assistant engineers: Dave Harris, Trevor White
