= Trout Mask Replica =

Studio album by Captain Beefheart and His Magic Band
- Released: June 16, 1969
- Recorded: August 1968 – March 1969
- Studios: Sunset Sound Recorders, Los Angeles; Whitney, Glendale; Portable facilities at 4295 Ensenada Drive, Woodland Hills
- Genres: Experimental rock; blues; avant-garde
- Length: 78:51
- Label: Straight
- Producer: Frank Zappa

Captain Beefheart and His Magic Band chronology
| Strictly Personal (1968) | Trout Mask Replica (1969) | Lick My Decals Off, Baby (1970) |

Singles from Trout Mask Replica
- 1. "Pachuco Cadaver / Wild Life" Released: 1970

Trout Mask Replica is the third studio album by the American musician Captain Beefheart and His Magic Band, released as a double album on June 16, 1969, by Straight Records. The music was composed by Captain Beefheart (Don Van Vliet) and arranged by drummer John "Drumbo" French. Combining elements of R&B, garage rock, and blues with free jazz and avant-garde composition, the album is regarded as an important work of experimental rock. Its unconventional musical style, which includes polyrhythm and polytonality, has given the album a reputation as one of the most challenging recordings in the 20th century musical canon.

The album was produced by Frank Zappa and recorded in March 1969 at Whitney Studios in Glendale, California, following eight months of intense rehearsals at a small rented communal house in Los Angeles. The lineup of the Magic Band at this time consisted of Bill "Zoot Horn Rollo" Harkleroad and Jeff "Antennae Jimmy Semens" Cotton on guitar, Mark "Rockette Morton" Boston on bass guitar, Victor "The Mascara Snake" Hayden on bass clarinet, and John "Drumbo" French on drums and percussion. Beefheart played several brass and woodwind instruments, including saxophone, musette, and natural horn, and contributed most of the vocal parts, while Zappa and members of the band provided occasional vocals and narration. The well-rehearsed Magic Band recorded all instrumental tracks (Note: Excluding the "home recordings" and "Moonlight on Vermont" and "Veteran's Day Poppy", recorded in 1968) for the album in a single six-hour recording session; Beefheart's vocal and horn tracks were laid down over the next few days.

Trout Mask Replica sold poorly upon its initial release in the United States, where it failed to appear in any charts. It was more successful in the United Kingdom, where it spent a week at number 21 on the UK Albums Chart. Trout Mask Replica has been widely regarded as the masterpiece of Beefheart's musical career, as well as an important influence on many subsequent artists. It was ranked number 60 on Rolling Stone's 2012 edition of the 500 Greatest Albums of All Time list, and has appeared on the "best of" lists of many other publications. In 2010, the album was selected for preservation in the United States National Recording Registry by the Library of Congress for being deemed "culturally, historically, or aesthetically significant".

== Background ==
Captain Beefheart and his Magic Band had a history of difficult relationships with record labels. A&M Records released the band's first single, a cover of Bo Diddley's "Diddy Wah Diddy", but dropped the contract after their first two singles failed to produce hits. Buddah Records released the band's (and the label's) first album, Safe as Milk, in 1967. However, the label began specializing in bubblegum pop, a style in which Captain Beefheart had no place, and the band again found themselves without a record label. In late 1967 and the spring of 1968, they had several sets of re-recording sessions for what became the albums Strictly Personal and Mirror Man. However, due to contractual uncertainties, they were unsure if the material would ever be released. Around this time, Van Vliet's high school friend Frank Zappa started his own record labels Bizarre and Straight, and offered Captain Beefheart, a name Zappa had given him, the opportunity to record an album with complete artistic freedom.

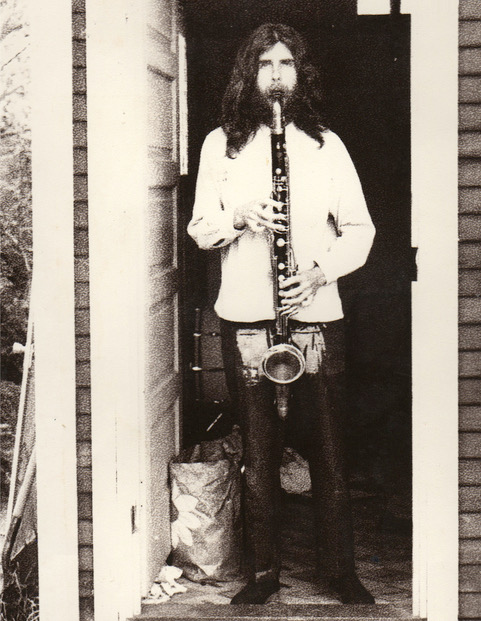
Victor Hayden (aka The Mascara Snake) playing bass clarinet at the house where Trout Mask Replica was rehearsed and recorded in 1968

In preparation, the band rehearsed Van Vliet's difficult compositions for eight months, living communally in a small rented house in Woodland Hills, Los Angeles. Van Vliet implemented his vision by asserting complete artistic and emotional domination of his musicians. At various times, one or another of the band members were put "in the barrel", with Van Vliet berating him continually, sometimes for days, until the musician collapsed in tears or in total submission to Van Vliet. According to John French and Bill Harkleroad, these sessions often included physical violence. French described the situation as "cultlike", and a visiting friend said that "the environment in that house was positively Manson-esque". Their material circumstances also were dire. With no income other than welfare and contributions from relatives, the band survived on a bare subsistence diet. French recounted living on no more than a small cup of soybeans a day for a month, and at one point, band members were arrested for shoplifting food (whereupon Zappa bailed them out). A visitor described their appearance as "cadaverous" and said that "they all looked in poor health". Band members were restricted from leaving the house and practiced for fourteen or more hours a day. Van Vliet once told his drummer that he himself had been diagnosed with paranoid schizophrenia.

== Recording ==
"Moonlight on Vermont" and "Veteran's Day Poppy" were recorded at Sunset Sound Recorders in August 1968, about seven months before the rest of the songs. These songs featured a lineup of Van Vliet, Bill Harkleroad and Jeff Cotton on guitar, John French on drums, and Van Vliet's friend Gary Marker serving temporarily on bass as a replacement for the recently departed Jerry Handley. About a month later, Mark Boston joined the band as full-time bassist. The lineup of Van Vliet, Harkleroad, Cotton, French, and Boston recorded the rest of the tracks, with Van Vliet's cousin Victor Hayden occasionally guesting on bass clarinet and vocals.

Zappa originally proposed to record the album as an "ethnic field recording" in the house where the band lived. Working with Zappa and engineer Dick Kunc, the band recorded some provisional backing tracks at the Woodland Hills house, with sound separation obtained simply by having different instruments in different rooms. Zappa thought these provisional recordings turned out well, but Van Vliet became suspicious that Zappa was trying to record the album on the cheap and insisted on using a professional studio. Zappa would say of Van Vliet's approach that it was "impossible to tell him why things should be such and such a way. It seemed to me that if he was going to create a unique object, that the best thing for me to do was to keep my mouth shut as much as possible and just let him do whatever he wanted to do whether I thought it was wrong or not." "Hair Pie: Bake 1", one of the tracks recorded by Zappa and Kunc at the house, appeared on the finished album. Three other tracks on the album were recorded on a cassette recorder at the house, the a cappella poems "The Dust Blows Forward 'n The Dust Blows Back" and "Orange Claw Hammer", and the improvised blues "China Pig" with former Magic Band member Doug Moon accompanying Van Vliet on guitar. "The Blimp" was recorded by Zappa in his studio while on the phone with Van Vliet prior to the album's sessions; Jeff Cotton was put on the phone to recite Van Vliet's latest poem, which Zappa recorded and put over a Mothers of Invention backing track (which had been known to the Mothers, uncredited on Trout Mask's credits, as "Charles Ives").

Beefheart playing his soprano sax during the album cover's photoshoot. February 1969

When they entered the studio, the band completed twenty instrumental tracks in a single six-hour recording session. Van Vliet spent the next few days overdubbing the vocals. Instead of singing while monitoring the instrumental tracks over headphones, he heard only the slight sound leakage through the studio window. As a result, the vocals are only vaguely in sync with the instrumental backing; when asked later about synchronization, he remarked, "That's what they do before a commando raid, isn't it?"

Van Vliet used the ensuing publicity, particularly with a 1970 Rolling Stone interview with Langdon Winner, to promulgate a number of myths which were subsequently quoted as fact. Winner's article stated, for instance, that neither Van Vliet nor the members of the Magic Band ever took drugs, but Harkleroad and French later discredited this. Van Vliet also claimed to have taught both Harkleroad and Mark Boston from scratch; in fact, the pair were already accomplished musicians before joining the band. Van Vliet also took complete credit for composition and arranging, a claim that band members strongly disputed in later years.

== Composition ==
According to Van Vliet, all of the songs on the album were written in a single eight-hour session. Band members have stated that two of the songs ("Moonlight on Vermont" and "Sugar 'n Spikes") were written around December 1967, while "Veteran's Day Poppy" was written around late May or early June 1968. Most of the rest were composed over a period of several months in the summer and fall of 1968 in an unprecedented process of experimentation. One influence on the compositional process was a tape that Van Vliet's friend Gary Marker had played for him. Marker, an aspiring recording engineer, was learning how to splice audio tape. He practiced by combining sections of various recordings so that they would join smoothly and maintain a consistent beat despite being from different sources. When Van Vliet heard the tape, he said excitedly, "That's what I want!"

Van Vliet used a piano, an instrument he had never played before, as his main compositional tool. Since he had no experience with the piano and no conventional musical knowledge at all, he was able to experiment with few preconceived ideas of musical form or structure. Van Vliet sat at the piano until he found a rhythmic or melodic pattern that he liked. John French then transcribed this pattern, typically only a measure or two long, into musical notation. After Van Vliet was finished, French would piece these fragments together into compositions, reminiscent of the splicing together of disparate source material on Marker's tape. French decided which part would be played on which instrument and taught each player his part, although Van Vliet had the final say over the ultimate shape of the product. Band member Bill Harkleroad has remarked on "how haphazardly the individual parts were done, worked on very surgically, stuck together, and then sculpted afterwards". Once completed, each song was played in exactly the same way every time, eschewing improvisation.

French has stated that about three-quarters of the songs were composed at the piano. The rest mostly consisted of parts that were whistled by Van Vliet. In a few cases, part of the song was composed at the piano while others were whistled. Three of the pieces were unaccompanied vocal solos ("Well", "The Dust Blows Forward and the Dust Blows Back", and "Orange Claw Hammer") while one was a spontaneous improvisation ("China Pig"). "Bills Corpse" was titled for the emaciated condition that Bill Harkleroad suffered before leaving an LSD cult to join the band, and possibly to similar conditions Van Vliet created within the band's house. Van Vliet called the song "Dali's Car" a "study in dissonance". "Hobo Chang Ba" was based on Van Vliet's stories "as a young teenager in Mojave of going down and hanging with the hobos. He said they were really nice people and he got to know the regulars." French states that "Old Fart at Play" "was never intended to have these lyrics. This is the only other time I saw Zappa aggressively put on his 'producer's hat' and assert his will on Don. The original title to this song was 'My Business Is the Truth, Your Business Is a Lie'." The album's title was adapted from some lines in "Old Fart at Play": ". . . the nose of the wooden mask / Where the holes had just been uh moment ago / Was now smooth amazingly blended camouflaged in / With the very intricate rainbow trout replica."

Several of the compositions include brief passages from other songs. Some were childhood reminiscences, such as Gene Autry's recording "El Rancho Grande", from which one of the guitar lines in "Veteran's Day Poppy" was adapted, or the "Shortnin' Bread" melody used in "Pachuco Cadaver". Others were more contemporary, such as the quote "come out to show dem [them]" from Steve Reich's "Come Out" used in "Moonlight on Vermont", or a melodic fragment from the Miles Davis recording of Concierto de Aranjuez used as the basis for the bridge of "Sugar 'n Spikes". The ending of "Moonlight on Vermont" also includes the refrain from the spiritual "Old-Time Religion". A nonmusical influence was the art of Salvador Dalí; the instrumental "Dali's Car" was inspired by the band's viewing of an installation of Dalí's Rainy Taxi.

== Reception and legacy ==
Professional ratings
Review scores
| Source | Rating |
|---|---|
| AllMusic | 5/5 stars |
| The Encyclopedia of Popular Music | 5/5 stars |
| Pitchfork | 10/10 |
| Q | 5/5 stars |
| The Rolling Stone Album Guide | 5/5 stars |
| Uncut | 4.5/5 stars |
| The Village Voice | B+ |

Trout Mask Replica is considered to be Captain Beefheart's magnum opus, and has appeared on lists of the greatest albums of all time. BBC disc jockey John Peel said of the album, "If there has been anything in the history of popular music which could be described as a work of art in a way that people who are involved in other areas of art would understand, then Trout Mask Replica is probably that work." Peel later ranked the record as the best pop album ever made. Lester Bangs, in his original review for Rolling Stone in 1969, hailed the album as "a total success, a brilliant, stunning enlargement and clarification of [Captain Beefheart's] art", and said that, on "a purely verbal level", it is "an explosion of maniacal free-association incantations". Years later, he wrote that "it was not even 'ahead' of its time in 1969. Then and now, it stands outside time, trends, fads, hypes, the rise and fall of whole genres eclectic as walking Christmas trees, constituting a genre unto itself: truly, a musical Monolith if ever there was one." Steve Huey of AllMusic lauded the album as "stunningly imaginative", and wrote that its influence "was felt more in spirit than in direct copycatting, as a catalyst rather than a literal musical starting point. However, its inspiring reimagining of what was possible in a rock context laid the groundwork for countless experiments in rock surrealism to follow, especially during the punk/new wave era." Artists such as Devo's Mark Mothersbaugh and the B-52s cited the album as an influence. The Guardian called the album "the standard by which almost all experimental rock music is judged, its reputation as a fearsomely difficult listen undimmed by the passing of time or its influence."

The album's unconventional nature often alienates new listeners. Cartoonist and writer Matt Groening tells of listening to Trout Mask Replica at the age of fifteen: "I thought it was the worst thing I'd ever heard. I said to myself, they're not even trying! It was just a sloppy cacophony. Then I listened to it a couple more times, because I couldn't believe Frank Zappa could do this to me – and because a double album cost a lot of money. About the third time, I realised they were doing it on purpose; they meant it to sound exactly this way. About the sixth or seventh time, it clicked in, and I thought it was the greatest album I'd ever heard". The Signal's John Henry wrote in 1969 that the listeners will either love or hate it, "with no middle ground", while journalist Will Smith, writing in the Omaha World-Herald in the same year, found that the album "becomes quite listenable after the initial shock" but was "not for the weak listener". John Harris of The Guardian later discussed the idea that the album requires several listens to "get it", concluding it still sounded "awful" after six listens. Critic Robert Christgau, in his 1969 "Consumer Guide" for The Village Voice, said that its "weirdness" prevented him from granting it a higher grade, but called it "very great played at high volume when you're feeling shitty, because you'll never feel as shitty as this record". In 2003, Rolling Stone stated that "On first listen, Trout Mask Replica sounds like raw Delta blues", with Beefheart "singing and ranting and reciting poetry over fractured guitar licks. But the seeming sonic chaos is an illusion ... Tracks such as 'Ella Guru' and 'My Human Gets Me Blues' are the direct predecessors of modern musical primitives such as Tom Waits and PJ Harvey".

In 2000, it was voted number 50 in Colin Larkin's All Time Top 1000 Albums. He stated "This record is living proof of his bizarre genius." In 2003, the album was ranked at number 59 by Rolling Stone in their list of 500 Greatest Albums of All Time, and it was ranked number 60 on the 2012 revision of the list: In his 1995 book The Alternative Music Almanac, Alan Cross placed the album at number two on his list of "10 Classic Alternative Albums". In 1995, Mojo put the album at number 28 on their "The 100 Greatest Albums Ever Made" list and at number 51 on their list of "The 100 Records That Changed the World". The album was also included in the book 1001 Albums You Must Hear Before You Die. Writer Al Spicer called it "in many ways the ultimate blues album, conveying intense experiences under intense pressure". The A.V. Club called it an "avant-garde masterpiece." Entertainment Weekly called it "an astonishing, influential onslaught of avant-garde blues that still reveals fresh lunatic nuances on the umpteenth listen." Academic Langdon Winner referred to it as "the most astounding and important work of art ever to appear on a phonograph record". On April 6, 2011, the album was added to the United States National Recording Registry for the year 2010 by the Library of Congress. On January 13, 2012, as part of its "Inside the National Recording Registry" series, the public radio program Studio 360 broadcast a tribute to the album featuring drummer John French, biographer Mike Barnes, and Beefheart devotee Waits.

Filmmaker David Lynch called Trout Mask Replica his favorite album of all time, and John Lydon has also listed it as one of the albums that shaped him, arguing: "It was anti-music in the most interesting and insane way ... all the bum notes I was being told off for by the teachers were finally being released by well-known artists. That was my confirmation. From then on, there was room for everything." Guitar virtuoso Steve Vai also praised the album and admitted that the first time he heard it, he was appalled by how out of tune the album was and by Van Vliet's vocals, but after meeting him, he gave the album another chance and compared it to "a liberation". In an October 1991 interview with Guitar Player magazine, when asked about his influences, guitarist John Frusciante of Red Hot Chili Peppers said, "the most important inspiration is undoubtedly Zoot Horn Rollo's playing on Captain Beefheart's Trout Mask Replica. If I listen to it first thing in the morning, I'm assured of a day of unbridled creativity."

== Track listing ==
All tracks are written by Don Van Vliet and arranged by John French.

Side one
| No. | Title | Length |
|---|---|---|
| 1. | "Frownland" | 1:41 |
| 2. | "The Dust Blows Forward 'n the Dust Blows Back" | 1:53 |
| 3. | "Dachau Blues" | 2:21 |
| 4. | "Ella Guru" | 2:26 |
| 5. | "Hair Pie: Bake 1" (instrumental) | 4:58 |
| 6. | "Moonlight on Vermont" | 3:59 |
| Total length: | | 17:18 |

Side two
| No. | Title | Length |
|---|---|---|
| 1. | "Pachuco Cadaver" | 4:40 |
| 2. | "Bill's Corpse" | 1:48 |
| 3. | "Sweet Sweet Bulbs" | 2:21 |
| 4. | "Neon Meate Dream of a Octafish" | 2:25 |
| 5. | "China Pig" | 4:02 |
| 6. | "My Human Gets Me Blues" | 2:46 |
| 7. | "Dali's Car" (instrumental) | 1:26 |
| Total length: | | 19:28 |

Side three
| No. | Title | Length |
|---|---|---|
| 1. | "Hair Pie: Bake 2" (instrumental) | 2:23 |
| 2. | "Pena" | 2:33 |
| 3. | "Well" | 2:07 |
| 4. | "When Big Joan Sets Up" | 5:18 |
| 5. | "Fallin' Ditch" | 2:08 |
| 6. | "Sugar'n Spikes" | 2:30 |
| 7. | "Ant Man Bee" | 3:57 |
| Total length: | | 20:56 |

Side four
| No. | Title | Length |
|---|---|---|
| 1. | "Orange Claw Hammer" | 3:34 |
| 2. | "Wild Life" | 3:09 |
| 3. | "She's Too Much for My Mirror" | 1:40 |
| 4. | "Hobo Chang Ba" | 2:02 |
| 5. | "The Blimp (Mousetrapreplica)" | 2:04 |
| 6. | "Steal Softly thru Snow" | 2:18 |
| 7. | "Old Fart at Play" | 1:51 |
| 8. | "Veteran's Day Poppy" | 4:31 |
| Total length: | | 21:09 78:51 |

== Personnel ==
Musicians

- Captain Beefheart (Don Van Vliet) – lead and backing vocals, spoken word, tenor saxophone, soprano saxophone, bass clarinet, musette, simran horn, hunting horn, jingle bells, producer (uncredited), engineer (uncredited)
- Drumbo (John French) – drums, percussion, engineer (uncredited on the original release), arrangement (uncredited)
- Antennae Jimmy Semens (Jeff Cotton) – guitar, "steel appendage guitar" (slide guitar using a metal slide), lead vocals on "Pena" and "The Blimp", "flesh horn" (voice with hand cupped over mouth) on "Ella Guru", speaking voice on "Old Fart at Play"
- Zoot Horn Rollo (Bill Harkleroad) – guitar, "glass finger guitar" (slide guitar using a glass slide), flute on "Hobo Chang Ba"
- Rockette Morton (Mark Boston) – bass guitar, narration on "Dachau Blues" and "Fallin' Ditch"
- The Mascara Snake (Victor Hayden) – bass clarinet, backing vocals on "Ella Guru", speaking voice on "Pena"

Additional personnel

- Doug Moon – acoustic guitar on "China Pig"
- Gary "Magic" Marker – bass guitar on "Moonlight on Vermont" and "Veteran's Day Poppy" (uncredited)
- Roy Estrada – bass guitar on "The Blimp" (uncredited)
- Arthur Tripp III – drums and percussion on "The Blimp" (uncredited)
- Don Preston – piano on "The Blimp" (uncredited)
- Ian Underwood – alto saxophone on "The Blimp" (uncredited/inaudible)
- Bunk Gardner – tenor saxophone on "The Blimp" (uncredited/inaudible)
- Buzz Gardner – trumpet on "The Blimp" (uncredited/inaudible)
- Frank Zappa – speaking voice on "Pena" and "The Blimp" (uncredited); engineer (uncredited); producer
- Richard "Dick" Kunc – speaking voice on "She's Too Much for My Mirror" (uncredited); engineer
- Cal Schenkel – album design
- Ed Caraeff and Cal Schenkel – photography

== General references ==
- Barnes, Mike (2004). Captain Beefheart: The Biography.
- Courrier, Kevin (2007). Trout Mask Replica.
- French, John (2010). Beefheart: Through the Eyes of Magic. Dartford, Kent, England: Proper Music Publishing. ISBN 978-0956121240.
