= Captain Beefheart =

American musician (1941–2010)

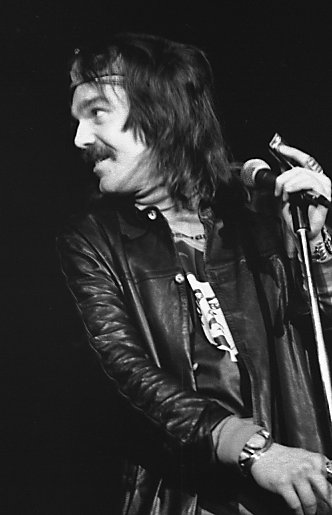
- Beefheart performing at Convocation Hall, Toronto, 1974

Background information
- Also known as: Bloodshot Rollin' Red; Don Van Vliet
- Born: Don Glen Vliet; January 15, 1941; Glendale, California, U.S.
- Died: December 17, 2010 (aged 69) Arcata, California, U.S.
- Genres: Rock; blues; avant-garde
- Occupations: Singer-songwriter; musician; painter; poet; composer; author; record producer
- Instruments: Vocals; harmonica; saxophone; bass clarinet; percussion
- Years active: 1964–1982
- Labels: A&M; Buddah; Blue Thumb; ABC; Reprise; Straight; Virgin; Mercury; DiscReet; Warner Bros.; Table of the Elements; Epic; Major League
- Formerly of: The Magic Band; The Mothers of Invention
- Website: beefheart.com

Don Van Vliet (/væn ˈvliːt/; born Don Glen Vliet; January 15, 1941 – December 17, 2010), known by his stage name Captain Beefheart, was an American singer, songwriter, multi-instrumentalist, and visual artist. Leading a rotating ensemble known as the Magic Band, he recorded 13 studio albums between 1967 and 1982. His music blended elements of blues, free jazz, rock, and avant-garde composition with idiosyncratic rhythms and absurdist wordplay. He possessed a distinctive gravelly voice and a wide vocal range.

Known as an enigmatic persona, Beefheart frequently constructed myths about his life and was known to exercise extreme, dictatorial control over the Magic Band. Although he achieved little commercial success, he sustained a cult following and became an influence on many experimental rock and punk-era artists.

Van Vliet began performing as Captain Beefheart in 1964, when he joined the original Magic Band lineup. The group's 1969 album Trout Mask Replica would rank 58th in Rolling Stone magazine's 2003 list of the 500 greatest albums of all time. After a period of recording more conventional blues rock to dissatisfaction among critics and fans, Beefheart formed a new Magic Band with a group of younger musicians and regained critical approval on his final recordings.

In 1982, Van Vliet retired from music and pursued a career in visual art. His abstract expressionist paintings and drawings command high prices, and have been exhibited in art galleries and museums across the world.

== Early life ==
Van Vliet was born Don Glen Vliet in Glendale, California, United States, on January 15, 1941, to Glen Alonzo Vliet, a service station owner from Kansas, and Willie Sue Vliet (née Warfield), who was from Arkansas. Van Vliet said that he was descended from adventurer and author Richard Halliburton and related to actor Slim Pickens, and that he remembered being born.

Vliet began painting and sculpting at age three. His subjects reflected his "obsession" with animals, particularly dinosaurs, fish, African mammals and lemurs. Considered a child prodigy, at age four he was featured with his animal sculptures on a Los Angeles television program. At the age of nine, he won a children's sculpting competition organized for the Los Angeles Zoo in Griffith Park by local tutor and sculptor Agostinho Rodrigues.

During the 1950s, Vliet worked as an apprentice with Rodrigues, who considered him a prodigy. Van Vliet said that he was a lecturer at the Barnsdall Art Institute in Los Angeles at the age of eleven, although it is likely he simply gave a form of artistic dissertation. He said that his parents discouraged his interest in sculpture due to their perception of artists as "queer". According to Van Vliet, they declined several scholarship offers, including one from the local Knudsen Creamery to travel to Europe with six years' paid tuition to study marble sculpture; this made him so bitter that he abandoned his art until he was twenty-three.

When Van Vliet was 13, the family moved to the farming town of Lancaster, California, in the Mojave Desert, where there was a growing aerospace industry supported by Edwards Air Force Base. It was an environment that would greatly influence Vliet creatively. He remained interested in art; several of his paintings were later used as covers for his albums. He developed his taste and interest in music, listening to the Delta blues of Son House and Robert Johnson; jazz artists such as Ornette Coleman, John Coltrane, Thelonious Monk, and Cecil Taylor; and the electric Chicago blues of Howlin' Wolf and Muddy Waters. Vliet socialized with members of local bands such as the Omens and the Blackouts. The Omens' guitarists, Alexis Snouffer and Jerry Handley, who would later found the Magic Band; the Blackouts' drummer was Frank Zappa. Van Vliet collaborated with Zappa on his scripts for "teenage operettas", one of which was entitled "Captain Beefheart & the Grunt People". The earliest known recording of both Beefheart and Zappa is "Lost in a Whirlpool", recorded c. 1958–59 and included in the 1996 posthumous Zappa album The Lost Episodes.

"Willie the Pimp"
Van Vliet's idiosyncratic vocal on Zappa's "Willie the Pimp" was among their collaborations.

Van Vliet claimed that "half a day of kindergarten" was the extent of his formal education, but his graduation picture appears in the Antelope Valley High School yearbook. His disavowals of education may have been related to his dyslexia; though never officially diagnosed, this condition was obvious to Magic Band members John French and Denny Walley, who observed his difficulty reading cue cards and his frequent need to be read to.

According to Zappa, Van Vliet "spent most of his time at home. His girlfriend lived in the house, his grandmother lived in the house, and his aunt and his uncle lived across the street. And his father had had a heart attack; his father drove a Helms bread truck; part of the time Don was helping out by taking over the bread truck route [and] driving up to Mojave. The rest of the time he would just sit at home and listen to rhythm and blues records, and scream at his mother to get him a Pepsi." Zappa later wrote the tune "Why Doesn't Someone Give Him a Pepsi?"

== Career ==
After Zappa began working at Paul Buff's Pal Recording Studio in Cucamonga, California (now part of Rancho Cucamonga), he and Van Vliet began collaborating as the Soots. By the time Zappa had turned the venue into Studio Z, they had completed the songs "Cheryl's Canon", "Metal Man Has Hornet's Wings" and a Howlin' Wolf-styled rendition of Little Richard's "Slippin' and Slidin'".

The name "Captain Beefheart" may have come from Van Vliet's uncle Alan, who had a habit of exposing himself to Don's girlfriend. He would urinate with the bathroom door open and, if she walked by, exclaim that his penis looked like a beef heart.

Van Vliet enrolled at Antelope Valley College as an art major, but left after one year. He worked as a door-to-door vacuum cleaner salesman, and sold a vacuum cleaner to the writer Aldous Huxley at his home in Llano, California, pointing to it and declaring, "Well, I assure you sir, this thing sucks." After managing a Kinney's shoe store, he moved to Cucamonga to reconnect with Zappa. Van Vliet was quite shy but was eventually able to imitate the deep voice of Howlin' Wolf with his wide vocal range. He grew comfortable with public performance and, after learning to play the harmonica, began playing at dances and small clubs in Southern California.

=== Initial recordings, 1962–69 ===
In early 1965, Snouffer invited Vliet to sing with a group that he was assembling. Vliet joined the first Magic Band and changed his name to Don Van Vliet, while Snouffer became Alex St. Clair. Captain Beefheart and his Magic Band signed to A&M Records and, in 1966, released two singles: a version of Bo Diddley's "Diddy Wah Diddy" that became a regional hit in Los Angeles, and "Moonchild" (written by David Gates, later of the band Bread). That year, the band began to play larger West Coast venues such as the Avalon Ballroom in San Francisco.

=== Safe as Milk ===
After fulfilling their deal for two singles, the band presented demos to A&M for what would become the album Safe as Milk. A&M's Jerry Moss reportedly described this new direction as "too negative" and dropped the band from the label. Much of the demo recording was accomplished at Art Laboe's Original Sound Studio, then with Gary Marker at Sunset Sound on 8-track. By the end of 1966, they were signed to Buddah Records and much of the demo work was transferred to 4-track, at the behest of Bob Krasnow and Richard Perry in the RCA Studio in Hollywood, where the recording was finalized. By now, Doug Moon had left the band and his tracks were taken up by Ry Cooder, who had been brought into the band after much pressure from Van Vliet.

Drummer John French had joined the group and it would be his patience that was required to transcribe Van Vliet's ideas (often expressed by whistling or banging on the piano) into musical form for the other group members. Upon French's departure, this role was taken over by Bill Harkleroad for Lick My Decals Off, Baby.

"Electricity"
26-second sample

Many of the lyrics on the Safe as Milk album were written by Van Vliet in collaboration with the writer Herb Bermann, who befriended Van Vliet after seeing him perform at a bar in Lancaster in 1966. The song "Electricity" was a poem written by Bermann, who gave Van Vliet permission to adapt it to music. Unlike the album's mostly blues rock sound, songs such as "Electricity" illustrated the band's unconventional instrumentation and Van Vliet's unusual vocals.

Much of the Safe as Milk material was honed and arranged by Cooder. The band began recording in spring 1967 and the album was released in September 1967. Richie Unterberger of AllMusic called it "blues–rock gone slightly askew, with jagged, fractured rhythms, soulful, twisting vocals from Van Vliet, and more doo wop, soul, straight blues, and folk–rock influences than he would employ on his more avant garde outings".

John Lennon displayed two of the album's promotional "baby bumper stickers" in the sunroom at his home. The Beatles planned to sign Beefheart to their experimental Zapple label, but these plans were scrapped after Allen Klein closed the label.

"Safe as Milk"
"Safe as Milk" from Strictly Personal, an album "having little in the way of lyrics or chords beyond the most primeval stomp" according to Stewart Mason in his AllMusic review

To support the Safe as Milk release, the group was scheduled to play at the 1967 Monterey Pop Festival. However, Van Vliet was having severe panic attacks at the time and was convinced that he was having a heart attack, a fear exacerbated by his heavy LSD use and the fact that his father had died of heart failure a few years earlier. At a vital warm-up performance at the Fantasy Fair and Magic Mountain Music Festival, the band began to play "Electricity" and Van Vliet froze, straightened his tie, and walked off the 10 ft (3.0 m) high stage and landed on manager Bob Krasnow. He later said he had seen a girl in the audience turn into a fish, with bubbles coming from her mouth. This aborted any opportunity of breakthrough success at Monterey, as Cooder decided he could no longer work with Van Vliet and quit. There was no time for the band to find a replacement. Cooder's spot was eventually filled by Gerry McGee, who had played with the Monkees. According to French, the band did two gigs with McGee, one at The Peppermint Twist near Long Beach, the other at the Santa Monica Civic Auditorium, August 7, 1967, as the opening act for The Yardbirds.

=== Strictly Personal ===
In August 1967, guitarist Jeff Cotton filled the spot vacated by Cooder and McGee. In October and November 1967 the Snouffer/Cotton/Handley/French line–up recorded material for what was planned to be a double album called It Comes to You in a Plain Brown Wrapper for the Buddah label–it was released in pieces in 1971 and 1995. After rejection from Buddah, Krasnow encouraged the band to re-record four of the shorter numbers, add two more, and make shorter versions of "Mirror Man" and "Kandy Korn". Krasnow created a strange mix full of "phasing" that, by most accounts (including Beefheart's), diminished the music's strength. This was released in October 1968 as Strictly Personal on Krasnow's Blue Thumb label. Stewart Mason in his Allmusic review of the album described it as a "terrific album" and a "fascinating, underrated release...every bit the equal of Safe as Milk and Trout Mask Replica". Langdon Winner of Rolling Stone called Strictly Personal "an excellent album...with the lyrics demonstrating "Beefheart's ability to juxtapose delightful humor with frightening insights".

=== Mirror Man ===
In 1971, some of the recordings done for Buddah were released as Mirror Man, bearing a liner note stating that the material had been recorded in "one night in Los Angeles in 1965". This was a ruse to circumvent possible copyright issues. The material was recorded in November and December 1967. It is a "jam" album, described as pushing "the boundaries of conventional blues–rock, with a Beefheart vocal tossed in here and there. Some may miss Beefheart's surreal poetry, gruff vocals, and/or free jazz influence, while others may find it fascinating to hear the Magic Band simply letting go and cutting loose." The album's "miss-credit errors" also state band members as "Alex St. Clare Snouffer" (Alex St. Clare/Alexis Snouffer), "Antennae Jimmy Simmons" (Semens/Jeff Cotton) and "Jerry Handsley" (Handley).

During his first trip to England in January 1968, Captain Beefheart was briefly represented by mod icon Peter Meaden, an early manager of the Who. The Captain and his band members were initially denied entry to the United Kingdom because Meaden had booked them for gigs without applying for the required work permits. Press coverage and public outcry resulted in the band being permitted to enter the UK, where they recorded material for John Peel's BBC radio show and, on Friday January 19, appeared at Middle Earth in London, where they played tracks from Safe as Milk and some of Mirror Man. The band was met by an enthusiastic audience. French recalled the event as a rare high moment: "After the show, we were taken to the dressing room where we sat for hours as a line of what seemed like hundreds of people walked in one by one to shake our hands or get an autograph. Many brought imports of Safe as Milk with them for us to autograph ... It seemed like we had finally gained some reward ... Suddenly all the criticizing and intimidation and eccentricities seemed very unimportant. It was a glorious moment, one of the very few I ever experienced". By this time, the band had terminated their association with Meaden. On January 27, 1968, they performed in the MIDEM Music Festival on the beach at Cannes, France.

=== The 'Brown Wrapper' Sessions ===
After returning to the US, the plan was for the band to leave Buddah and sign to MGM Records, and they re-recorded some Buddah material of the partial Mirror Man sessions at Sunset Sound with Bruce Botnick. Beefheart was conceptualizing new band names, including 25th Century Quaker and Blue Thumb. The idea of 25th Century Quaker was that it would be a "blues band" alias for the more avant-garde work of the Magic Band. Krasnow then set up his own label, Blue Thumb, which launched with Strictly Personal. Thus "25th Century Quaker" became a track and a potential band-name became a label. Given that Krasnow had poached the band from Buddah, there were limitations on what material could be released. The raft of material left behind emerged as I May Be Hungry, But I Sure Ain't Weird. Both Blue Thumb and the stamps on the cover of Strictly Personal have LSD connotations, as does the track "Ah Feel Like Ahcid".

=== Trout Mask Replica ===
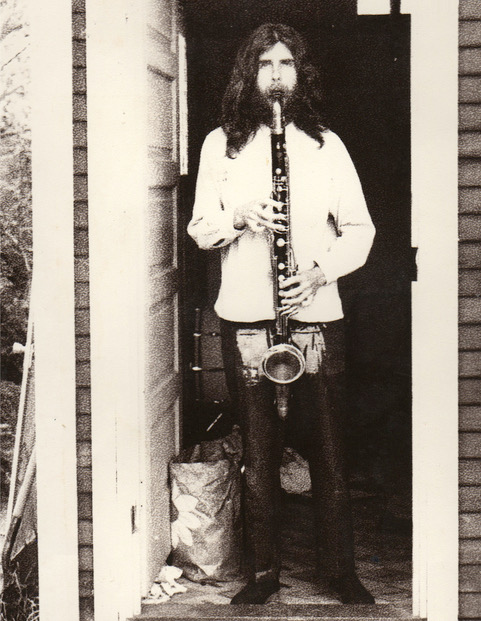
Victor Hayden (aka the Mascara Snake) at the house where Trout Mask Replica was rehearsed and recorded in 1968

Eventually acclaimed as Van Vliet's magnum opus, Trout Mask Replica was released as a 28-track double album in June 1969 on Zappa's newly formed Straight Records label.

Alex St. Clair had now left the band and, after Elwood Madeo from the Blackouts was considered, the role was filled by Bill Harkleroad. Bassist Jerry Handley had also departed, with Gary Marker stepping in–he was soon replaced by Mark Boston. Thus the long rehearsals for the album began in the rented house in Woodland Hills that would become the Magic Band House.

The Magic Band began recordings for Trout Mask Replica at TTG Studios; it was completed at the Whitney Studios, with some field recordings made at the house. Van Vliet assigned nicknames to his band members, so Harkleroad became Zoot Horn Rollo, Boston became Rockette Morton, John French assumed the name Drumbo, and Jeff Cotton became Antennae Jimmy Semens. Van Vliet's cousin Victor Hayden, the Mascara Snake, performed as a bass clarinetist. Vliet's girlfriend Laurie Stone, who can be heard laughing at the beginning of "Fallin' Ditch", became the audio typist.

Van Vliet wanted the band to "live" the Trout Mask Replica album. The group rehearsed his difficult compositions for eight months, with everyone living in the two-bedroom house. Van Vliet implemented his vision by completely dominating his musicians, artistically and emotionally. He would berate a musician continually, sometimes for days, until the musician collapsed in tears or in total submission. Bill Harkleroad complained that his fingers were a "bloody mess" as a result of Beefheart's orders that he use heavy strings. French described the situation as "cultlike" and a visitor said "the environment in that house was positively Mansonesque". Their material circumstances were dire. With no income other than welfare and contributions from relatives, the group barely survived and some were arrested for shoplifting food. French recalled living on no more than a small cup of beans a day for a month. A visitor described their appearance as "cadaverous". Band members were restricted from leaving the house and rehearsed for 14 or more hours a day.

In his 2010 book Through the Eyes of Magic, French describes how, when he did not finish drum parts quickly enough, he was punched by band members, thrown into walls, kicked, and attacked with a sharpened broomstick. Beefheart punched him in the face and threatened to throw him out a window. He admits complicity in similarly attacking his bandmates during Beefheart's "talks" aimed at them. In the end, after the album's recording, Beefheart ejected French from the band by throwing him down a flight of stairs, telling him to "Take a walk" after French did not properly respond to a request to "play a strawberry". Beefheart replaced French with drummer Jeff Burchell, a roadie with no drumming experience whom Beefheart called "Fake Drumbo". French's name does not appear on the album credits.

According to Van Vliet, the 28 songs on the album were written in a single 8 1/2-hour session at the piano, an instrument he did not play. Band members have stated that the songs were written over the course of a year, beginning around December 1967. It took them eight months to mold the songs into shape, with French bearing primary responsibility for transposing and shaping Vliet's piano fragments into guitar and bass lines. Harkleroad recalled: "We're dealing with a strange person, coming from a place of being a sculptor/painter, using music as his idiom. He was getting more into that part of who he was instead of this blues singer. The band had rehearsed the songs so thoroughly that the instrumental tracks for 21 of the songs were recorded in a single four-and-a-half-hour session.

"Moonlight on Vermont"
"Moonlight on Vermont" from Trout Mask Replica, that well illustrates the album's sound and composition

"Pena"
"Pena"; An example of the album's avant-garde instrumentation and bizarre lyrical content

Trout Mask Replica incorporated a wide variety of musical styles, including blues, avant garde/experimental, and rock. The relentless practice prior to recording blended the music into an iconoclastic whole of contrapuntal tempos, featuring slide guitar, polyrhythmic drumming (with French's drums and cymbals covered in cardboard), honking saxophone and bass clarinet. Van Vliet's vocals range from his signature Howlin' Wolf-inspired growl to frenzied falsetto to laconic, casual ramblings.

The instrumental backing was recorded live, while Van Vliet overdubbed most of the vocals in only partial sync with the music by hearing the slight sound leakage through the studio window. Zappa said of Van Vliet's approach, "[it was] impossible to tell him why things should be such and such a way. It seemed to me that if he was going to create a unique object, that the best thing for me to do was to keep my mouth shut as much as possible and just let him do whatever he wanted to do whether I thought it was wrong or not."

The cover of the album's gatefold sleeve shows Beefheart in a modified Pilgrim hat wearing the raw head of a carp fashioned into a mask by photographer Cal Schenkel.The inner spread "infra-red" photography is by Ed Caraeff, whose Beefheart vacuum cleaner images from this session also appear on Zappa's Hot Rats release to accompany "Willie The Pimp" lyrics sung by Vliet. The inner sleeve of the album includes a school-age portrait of Van Vliet.

Van Vliet used the ensuing publicity, particularly with a 1970 Rolling Stone interview with Langdon Winner, to promulgate a number of myths. Winner's article stated, for instance, that neither Van Vliet nor the members of the Magic Band ever took drugs; Harkleroad contradicted this. Van Vliet claimed to have taught Harkleroad and Boston to play their instruments from scratch; in fact, both were accomplished musicians before joining the band. Lastly, Van Vliet claimed to have gone a year and half without sleeping. When asked how this was possible, he claimed to have only eaten fruit.

AllMusic critic Steve Huey writes that the album's influence "was felt more in spirit than in direct copycatting, as a catalyst rather than a literal musical starting point. However, its inspiring re-imagining of what was possible in a rock context laid the groundwork for countless experiments in rock surrealism to follow, especially during the punk and new wave era." In 2003, the album was ranked sixtieth by Rolling Stone on its list of the 500 Greatest Albums of All Time: "On first listen, Trout Mask Replica sounds like raw Delta blues", with Beefheart "singing and ranting and reciting poetry over fractured guitar licks. Tracks such as "Ella Guru" and "My Human Gets Me Blues" are the direct predecessors of modern musical primitives such as Tom Waits and PJ Harvey." Guitarist Fred Frith noted that during this process "forces that usually emerge in improvisation are harnessed and made constant, repeatable".

Critic Robert Christgau gave the album a B+, saying, "I find it impossible to give this record an A because it is just too weird. But I'd like to. Very great played at high volume when you're feeling shitty, because you'll never feel as shitty as this record." John Peel said of the album: "If there has been anything in the history of popular music which could be described as a work of art in a way that people who are involved in other areas of art would understand, then Trout Mask Replica is probably that work." It was inducted into the United States National Recording Registry in 2011.

=== Lick My Decals Off, Baby ===
Lick My Decals Off, Baby (1970) continued in a similarly experimental vein. An album with "a very coherent structure" in the Magic Band's "most experimental and visionary stage", it was Van Vliet's most commercially successful in the United Kingdom, spending twenty weeks on the UK Albums Chart and peaking at number 20. An early promotional music video was made of its title song, and a bizarre television commercial included excerpts from "Woe-Is-uh-Me-Bop", silent footage of masked Magic Band members using kitchen utensils as musical instruments, and Beefheart kicking over a bowl of what appears to be porridge onto a dividing stripe in the middle of a road. The video was rarely played but was accepted into the Museum of Modern Art, where it has been used in several programs related to music.

On this LP, Art Tripp III, formerly of Zappa's Mothers of Invention, played drums and marimba, along with a returning John French. Lick My Decals Off, Baby was the first record on which the band was credited as "The" Magic Band, rather than "His" Magic Band. Journalist Irwin Chusid interprets this change as "a grudging concession of its members' at least semi-autonomous humanity". Robert Christgau gave the album an A−, commenting, "Beefheart's famous five-octave range and covert totalitarian structures have taken on a playful undertone, repulsive and engrossing and slapstick funny." Due to licensing disputes, Lick My Decals Off, Baby was unavailable on CD for many years, though it remained in print on vinyl. It was ranked second in Uncut magazine's May 2010 list of The 50 Greatest Lost Albums.

=== The Spotlight Kid & Clear Spot ===
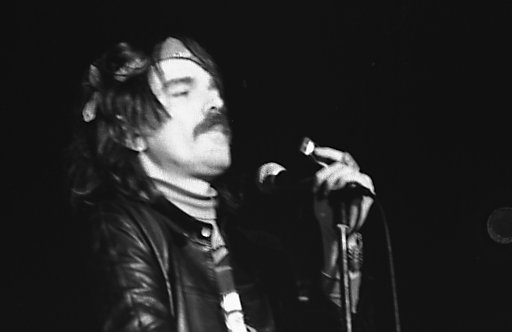
Beefheart performing at Convocation Hall, Toronto, in 1974.

The next two records, The Spotlight Kid (simply credited to "Captain Beefheart") and Clear Spot (credited to "Captain Beefheart and the Magic Band"), were both released in 1972. The atmosphere of The Spotlight Kid is, according to one critic, "definitely relaxed and fun, maybe one step up from a jam". And though "things do sound maybe just a little too blasé", "Beefheart at his worst still has something more than most groups at their best." The music is simpler and slower than on the group's two previous releases; this was in part an attempt by Van Vliet to become a more appealing commercial proposition as the band had made almost no money during the previous two years. Van Vliet said he "got tired of scaring people with what I was doing ... I realized that I had to give them something to hang their hat on, so I started working more of a beat into the music. It's more human that way".

Magic Band members said that the slower performances were due in part to Van Vliet's inability to fit his lyrics with the instrumental backing of the faster material on the earlier albums, a problem that was exacerbated by the fact that he almost never rehearsed with the group. In the period leading up to the recording, the band again lived communally, first at a compound near Ben Lomond, California and then in northern California near Trinidad. The situation saw a return to the physical violence and psychological manipulation. According to John French, the worst of this was directed at Harkleroad. In his autobiography, Harkleroad recalls being thrown into a dumpster, an act he interpreted as having "metaphorical intent".

Clear Spot's production credit of Ted Templeman made AllMusic's Ned Raggett consider "why in the world [it] wasn't more of a commercial success", and that while fans "of the fully all-out side of Beefheart might find the end result not fully up to snuff as a result, but those less concerned with pushing back all borders all the time will enjoy his unexpected blend of everything tempered with a new accessibility". The review called the song "Big Eyed Beans from Venus" "a fantastically strange piece of aggression". A Clear Spot song, "Her Eyes Are A Blue Million Miles", appeared on the soundtrack of the Coen brothers' 1998 cult comedy The Big Lebowski. In June 2026, CBS News included the song in its list of the 250 essential American songs of the past 250 years.

=== Unconditionally Guaranteed & Bluejeans & Moonbeams ===
In 1974, immediately after the recording of Unconditionally Guaranteed, which continued the trend towards a more commercial sound, the Magic Band's original members departed. They worked together for a period, gigging at Blue Lake and putting together their own ideas and demos, with John French as vocalist. These concepts eventually coalesced around the core of Art Tripp III, Harkleroad and Boston, with the formation of the band Mallard, helped by money and UK recording facilities from Jethro Tull's Ian Anderson. Some of French's compositions were used in the band's work, but the group's singer was Sam Galpin and the role of keyboardist was taken by John Thomas, who shared a house with French in Eureka. At this time Vliet attempted to recruit both French and Harkleroad as producers for his next album, but his pleas fell on deaf ears.

Vliet was forced to form a new Magic Band to complete support-tour dates. He recruited singer and keyboardist Michael Smotherman, bassist Paul Uhrig, drummer Ty Grimes, saxophonist Del Simmons, and guitarists Dean Smith and Robert 'Fuzzy' Fuscaldo. These were session musicians who had never heard Beefheart's music, so they improvised what they thought would go with each song, playing much slicker "bar band" versions. A review described this incarnation of the Magic Band as the "Tragic Band", a term that stuck. Mike Barnes said that the description of the new band "grooving along pleasantly", was "... an appropriately banal description of the music of a man who only a few years ago had composed with the express intent of shaking listeners out of their torpor." The one album this band recorded, Bluejeans & Moonbeams (1974) has a completely different, almost soft rock sound. Neither was well received; drummer Art Tripp recalled that when he and the original Magic Band listened to Unconditionally Guaranteed, they "were horrified...each song was worse than the one which preceded it". Beefheart later disowned both albums, calling them "horrible and vulgar", asking that they not be considered part of his musical output and urging fans who bought them to "take copies back for a refund".

=== Bongo Fury and Bat Chain Puller ===
"Bat Chain Puller"
"Bat Chain Puller" from the original Bat Chain Puller, the album that was supposed to mark Van Vliet's return to prominence and form.

"Ice Cream for Crow"
Ice Cream for Crow, the title track of the final Beefheart album

By the fall of 1975, the band had completed a European tour, and added US dates in early 1976, supporting Zappa and Dr. John. Van Vliet now found himself stuck in a web of contractual hang-ups. Zappa extended a helping hand, with Vliet performing incognito as "Bloodshot Rollin' Red" on One Size Fits All (1975) and then joining with him on the Bongo Fury album and its tour. Two Vliet-penned numbers on Bongo Fury are "Sam with the Showing Scalp Flat Top" and "Man with the Woman Head". He also sings "Poofter's Froth Wyoming Plans Ahead", harmonizes on "200 Years Old" and "Muffin Man", and plays harmonica and saxophone.

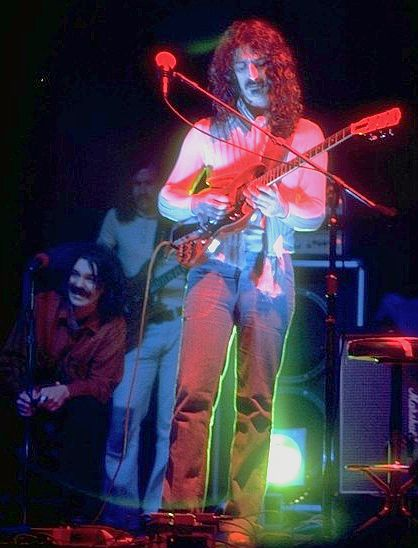
Van Vliet seated left on stage with Zappa in 1975 in their Bongo Fury tour

The friendship between Zappa and Van Vliet was sometimes expressed in the form of rivalry as musicians drifted back and forth between their groups. Van Vliet embarked on the 1975 Bongo Fury tour with Zappa and the Mothers, mainly because conflicting contractual obligations made him unable to tour or record independently. Their relationship grew acrimonious on the tour to the point that they refused to talk to one another. Zappa became irritated by Van Vliet, who drew constantly, including while on stage, filling one of his large sketch books with rapidly executed portraits and warped caricatures of Zappa. Musically, Van Vliet's intuitive style contrasted sharply with Zappa's compositional discipline and abundant technique. Mothers of Invention drummer Jimmy Carl Black described the situation as "two geniuses" on "ego trips". Estranged for years afterwards, they reconnected at the end of Zappa's life, after his diagnosis of terminal prostate cancer.

Their collaborative work appears on the Zappa rarity collections The Lost Episodes (1996) and Mystery Disc (1996). Particularly notable is their song "Muffin Man", included on Bongo Fury and Zappa's compilation album Strictly Commercial (1995). Zappa finished concerts with the song for many years afterwards. Beefheart also provided vocals for "Willie the Pimp" on Zappa's otherwise instrumental album Hot Rats (1969). Van Vliet played the harmonica on two songs on Zappa albums: "San Ber'dino" on One Size Fits All (1975) and "Find Her Finer" on Zoot Allures (1976). He is also the vocalist on "The Torture Never Stops (Original Version)" on Zappa's You Can't Do That on Stage Anymore, Vol. 4.

In early 1976, Zappa offered his studio and finances to produce the Vliet album Bat Chain Puller. The band was John French (drums), John Thomas (keyboards) and guitarists Moris Tepper and Denny Walley. Much of the work on this album was finished and some demos had been circulated when, in May 1976, the long association between Zappa and his manager/business partner Herb Cohen ceased. This resulted in Zappa's finances and works becoming part of protracted legal negotiations. The Bat Chain Puller project went "on ice" and did not see an official release until 2012.

In 1977, Beefheart appeared on the Tubes' album Now, playing saxophone on the song "Cathy's Clone". The album also featured a cover of the Clear Spot song "My Head Is My Only House Unless It Rains". In 1978 he appeared on Jack Nitzsche's soundtrack to the film Blue Collar.

=== Shiny Beast (Bat Chain Puller) ===
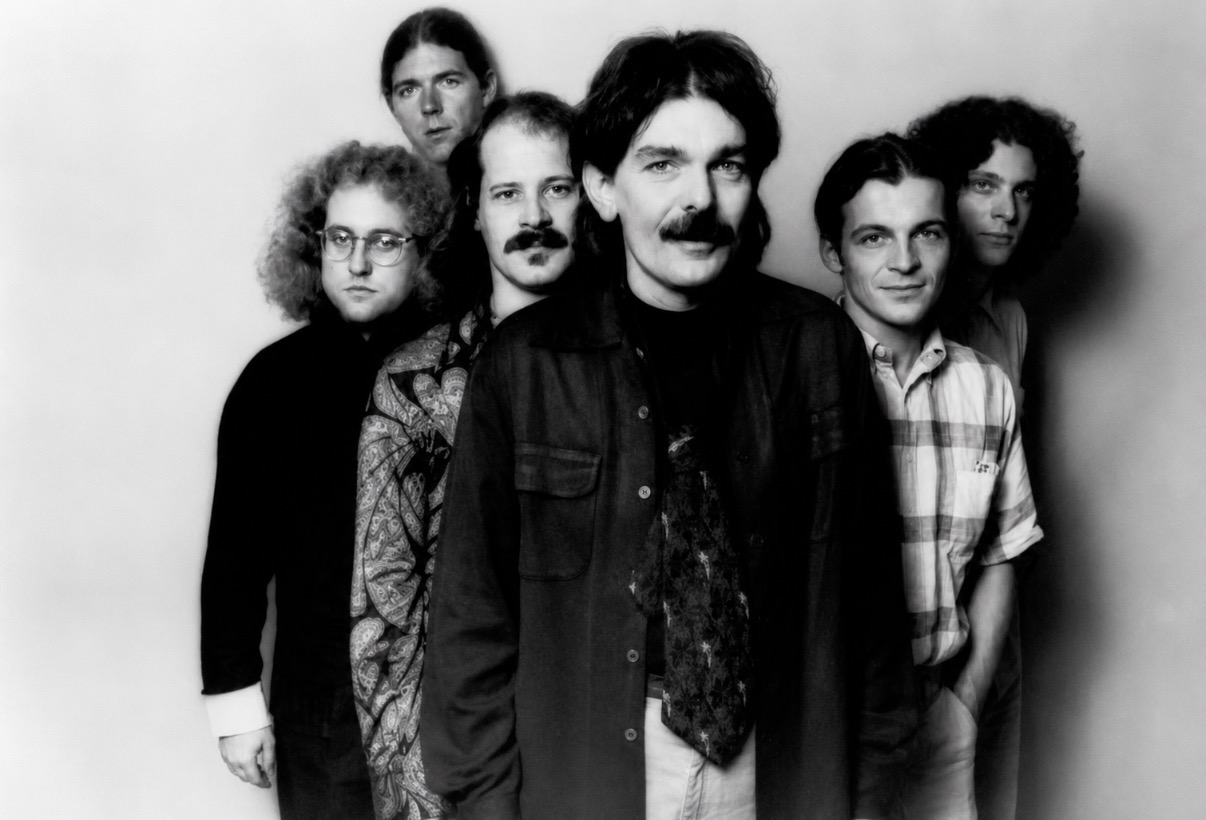
Captain Beefheart with his new Magic Band in 1978. From left to right: Eric Drew Feldman, Richard Redus, Bruce Fowler, Captain Beefheart, Robert Arthur Williams, Jeff Moris Tepper

Having extricated himself from a mire of contractual difficulties, Beefheart emerged with 1978's Shiny Beast (Bat Chain Puller), on the Warner Bros label. It contained re-workings of the shelved Bat Chain Puller album and retained its original guitarist, Moris Tepper. He and Vliet were now joined by Richard Redus (guitar, bass and accordion), Eric Drew Feldman (bass, piano and synthesizer), Bruce Lambourne Fowler (trombone and air bass), Art Tripp (percussion and marimba) and Robert Arthur Williams (drums). The album was co-produced by Vliet and Pete Johnson. Members of this Magic Band and the "Bat Chain" elements would feature on Beefheart's last two albums.

Shiny Beast (Bat Chain Puller) was described by Ned Raggett of Allmusic as "... manna from heaven for those feeling Beefheart had lost his way on his two Mercury albums". Following Vliet's death, John French claimed the 40-second spoken word track "Apes-Ma" was an analogy of Van Vliet's deteriorating physical condition. The album's sleeve features Van Vliet's 1976 painting Green Tom.

=== Doc at the Radar Station ===
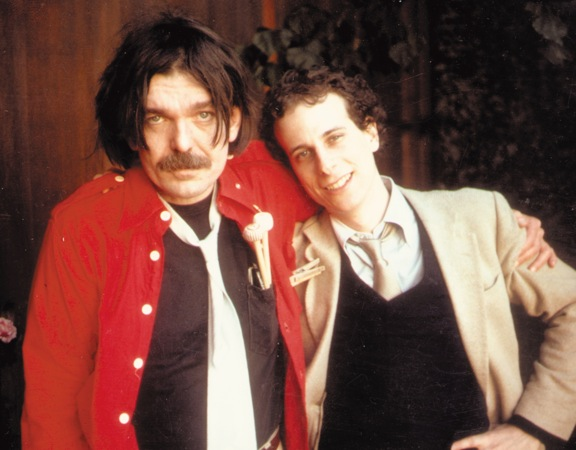
Don Van Vliet and Gary Lucas during the Doc at the Radar Station sessions (May 1980)

Doc at the Radar Station (1980) helped establish Beefheart's late resurgence. Released by Virgin Records during the post-punk era, the music was now accessible to a younger, more receptive audience. He was interviewed in a feature report on KABC-TV's Channel 7 Eyewitness News in which he was hailed as "the father of the new wave. One of the most important American composers of the last fifty years, [and] a primitive genius". Van Vliet said he was "doing a non-hypnotic music to break up the catatonic state ... and I think there is one right now."

Steve Huey of AllMusic cited Doc at the Radar Station as "the strongest album of his comeback" and "an excellent, focused consolidation of Beefheart's past and then-present". Van Vliet's biographer Mike Barnes writes of "revamping work built on skeletal ideas and fragments that would have mouldered away in the vaults had they not been exhumed and transformed into full-blown, totally convincing new material". During this period, Van Vliet made two appearances on Late Night with David Letterman and one on Saturday Night Live.

=== Ice Cream for Crow ===
The final Beefheart record, Ice Cream for Crow (1982), was recorded with Gary Lucas (who was also Van Vliet's manager), Moris Tepper, Richard Snyder and Cliff Martinez. This lineup made a video to promote the title track, directed by Van Vliet and Ken Schreiber, with cinematography by Daniel Pearl, which was rejected by MTV for being "too weird". However, the video was included in a Letterman broadcast, and was accepted by the Museum of Modern Art.

Ice Cream for Crow features instrumental performances by the Magic Band with performance poetry readings by Van Vliet. Ned Raggett called the album a "last entertaining blast of wigginess from one of the few truly independent artists in late 20th century pop music, with humor, skill, and style all still intact", with the Magic Band "turning out more choppy rhythms, unexpected guitar lines, and outré arrangements, Captain Beefheart lets everything run wild as always, with successful results". Barnes writes that, "The most original and vital tracks (on the album) are the newer ones", and that it "feels like an hors-d'oeuvre for a main course that never came". Michael Galucci of Goldmine praised the album, describing it as "the single, most bizarre entry in Van Vliet's long, odd career." Van Vliet subsequently retired from music to return to visual art.

== Career as an artist ==
In the mid-1980s, Van Vliet became reclusive and abandoned music, stating he had gotten "too good at the horn" and could make far more money painting. His first exhibition had been at The Bluecoat in Liverpool during the Magic Band's 1972 UK tour. He was interviewed on Granada regional television, standing in front of his bold black and white canvases. He was further inspired when Julian Schnabel, who admired the artwork on his album covers, asked to buy a drawing from him. His debut exhibition as a serious painter was at the Mary Boone Gallery in New York in 1985; it was initially regarded as that of "another rock musician dabbling in art for ego's sake", though his work has since received more serious attention, with some sales approaching $25,000.

Cross Poked Shadow of a Crow No. 2 (1990)

In the early 1980s, Van Vliet established an association with the Galerie Michael Werner in Cologne. Eric Drew Feldman said that Werner told Van Vliet that he needed to stop playing music if he wanted to be respected as a painter, or he would only be considered a "musician who paints". In doing so, it was said that he had effectively "succeeded in leaving his past behind".

Van Vliet has been described as a modernist, a primitivist, an abstract expressionist, and, "in a sense" an outsider artist. Morgan Falconer of Artforum concurs, mentioning both a "neo-primitivist aesthetic" and stating that his work is influenced by the CoBrA painters. The resemblance to the CoBrA painters is also recognized by art critic Roberto Ohrt, while others have compared his paintings to the work of Jackson Pollock, Franz Kline, Antonin Artaud, Francis Bacon, Vincent van Gogh, and Mark Rothko.

Dr. John Lane, director of the San Francisco Museum of Modern Art, said that, although Van Vliet's work has associations with mainstream abstract expressionist painting, more importantly he was a self-taught artist and his painting "has that same kind of edge the music has". Curator David Breuer asserts that, in contrast to the busied, bohemian urban lives of the New York abstract expressionists, the rural desert environment Van Vliet was influenced by is distinctly naturalistic, and that he is a distinguished figure in contemporary art whose work will survive in the canon. Van Vliet stated of his own work, "I'm trying to turn myself inside out on the canvas. I'm trying to completely bare what I think at that moment" and "I paint for the simple reason that I have to. I feel a sense of relief after I do." When asked about his artistic influences he stated that there were none. "I just paint like I paint and that's enough influence." He did, however, state his admiration of Georg Baselitz, Piet Mondrian, and Vincent van Gogh; after seeing van Gogh's paintings, Van Vliet quoted himself as saying, "The sun disappoints me so."

Exhibits of his paintings from the late 1990s were held in New York in 2009 and 2010. He exhibited only few of his paintings because he immediately destroyed any that did not satisfy him. Falconer stated that the exhibitions showed "evidence of a serious, committed artist".

== Publications ==
In 1987, Van Vliet published Skeleton Breath, Scorpion Blush, a collection of his poetry, paintings and drawings.

Two books have been published specifically devoted to critique and analysis of his artwork: Riding Some Kind of Unusual Skull Sleigh: On The Arts Of Don Van Vliet (1999) by W. C. Bamberger and Stand Up To Be Discontinued, first published in 1993, a now rare collection of essays on Van Vliet's work. The limited-edition version of the book contains a CD of Van Vliet reading six of his poems: Fallin' Ditch, The Tired Plain, Skeleton Makes Good, Safe Sex Drill, Tulip and Gill. A deluxe edition was published in 1994; only 60 were printed, with etchings of Van Vliet's signature, costing £180.

In 2004, Rhino Handmade released in a limited edition of 1,500 copies of Riding Some Kind of Unusual Skull Sleigh. It is a signed and numbered box set containing a CD of Vliet-recited poetry, the Anton Corbijn film of Vliet Some YoYo Stuff on DVD, and two art books produced by Artist Ink Editions. Splinters is a visual "scrapbook" of Vliet's life. The second book, eponymously titled, is packed with Vliet's artwork. An onion-skin wallet contains a matching-numbered Vliet lithograph on hand-rolled paper, signed by the artist.

== Later life and death ==
Van Vliet in Anton Corbijn's 1993 Some Yo Yo Stuff

After his retirement from music, Van Vliet rarely appeared in public. He lived near Trinidad, California, with his wife Janet. By the early 1990s, his multiple sclerosis had advanced to the point where he was using a wheelchair.

One of Van Vliet's last public appearances was in the 1993 short documentary Some Yo Yo Stuff by filmmaker Anton Corbijn, described as an "observation of his observations". Around 13 minutes long and shot entirely in black and white, with an appearance by David Lynch, the film showed a noticeably weakened and dysarthric Van Vliet at home, reading poetry and discussing his life, environment, music and art. In 2000, he appeared on Gary Lucas's album Improve the Shining Hour and Moris Tepper's Moth to Mouth, and spoke on Tepper's 2004 song "Ricochet Man" from the album Head Off. He is credited for naming Tepper's 2010 album A Singer Named Shotgun Throat.

Van Vliet supported environmental issues and causes, particularly those concerned with the welfare of animals. In 2003 he was heard on the compilation album Where We Live: Stand for What You Stand On: A Benefit CD for EarthJustice, singing a version of "Happy Birthday to You" retitled "Happy Earthday". The track lasts 34 seconds and was recorded over the telephone.

Van Vliet died at a hospital in Arcata, California, on Friday, December 17, 2010, of complications from multiple sclerosis. Tom Waits and Kathleen Brennan commented on his death, saying he was "Wondrous, secret ... and profound, he was a diviner of the highest order."

On the day of his death, Dweezil Zappa dedicated the song "Willie the Pimp" to Beefheart at the "Zappa Plays Zappa" show at the Beacon Theatre, while actor Jeff Bridges stated "Rest in peace, Captain Beefheart!" at the conclusion of the December 18, 2010, episode of Saturday Night Live.

== Musical style ==
Captain Beefheart was a pioneer of art rock and experimental rock. His music has been cited as an influence on punk rock, post-punk and new wave music, and he has been classified as a proto-punk musician.

Rolling Stone wrote that "The crucial problem in Beefheart's career has been that few people have ever been able to accept him for what he is, a blues and rock musician". His management referred to him as "potentially the greatest white blues singer of all time", while a combination of managers, musicians, fans and critics felt that he should have either sung more clearly and softly, made more commercial music or played "blues songs that people could understand and dance to". He adapted to, and pushed the boundaries of, genres throughout his career. According to Entertainment Weekly, his music "drew on blues, jazz, psychedelia, and a thousand other subgenres". The Independent described his music as a fusion of rhythm and blues and avant-garde jazz. Far Out magazine said that his "combination of jazz, blues and psychedelic rock" defied categorization, and as a result of his difficult to place style, many simply referred to it as avant-garde. According to Rolling Stone, "Beefheart's brand of abrasive blues-rock was truly a novelty to young listeners in 1964". Popular Song in the 20th Century: Styles and Singers and What They Said About America included him among the prominent progressive rock musicians of the 1960s and '70s.

John Parish described Captain Beefheart's music as a "combination of raw blues and abstract jazz. There was humour in there, but you could tell that it wasn't [intended as] a joke. I felt that there was a depth to what he did that very few other rock artists have managed to achieve." A Rolling Stone biography described his work as "a sort of modern chamber music for rock bands, since he plans every note and teaches the band their parts by ear." The Encyclopædia Britannica describes Beefheart's songs as conveying a "deep distrust of modern civilization, a yearning for ecological balance, and the belief that all animals in the wild are far superior to human beings". Barret Hansen, in a review of Strictly Personal, described the singer as "the only white voice that has come close to capturing what Charley Patton and Son House are all about".

Van Vliet was often critical of the Beatles. He considered the lyric "I'd love to turn you on" from "A Day in the Life" to be ridiculous and conceited. Tiring of their "lullabies", he lampooned them with the Strictly Personal song "Beatle Bones 'n' Smokin' Stones", with the sardonic refrain of "strawberry fields, all the winged eels slither on the heels of today's children, strawberry fields forever". Van Vliet spoke badly of Lennon after getting no response when he sent a telegram of support to him and wife Yoko Ono during their 1969 "Bed-in".

== Legacy ==
Van Vliet has been the subject of two documentaries, the BBC's 1997 The Artist Formerly Known as Captain Beefheart, narrated by John Peel, and the 2006 independent production Captain Beefheart: Under Review.

According to Peel, "If there has ever been such a thing as a genius in the history of popular music, it's Beefheart ... A psychedelic shaman who frequently bullied his musicians and sometimes alarmed his fans, Don somehow remained one of rock's great innocents." Mike Barnes referred to him as an "iconic counterculture hero" who, with the Magic Band, "went on to stake out startling new possibilities for rock music". Lester Bangs cited Beefheart as "one of the four or five unqualified geniuses to rise from the hothouses of American music in the Sixties", while John Harris of The Guardian praised the music's "pulses with energy and ideas, the strange way the spluttering instruments meld together". A Rolling Stone biography said that, because his work "breaks so many of rock's conventions at once, Beefheart's music has always been more influential than popular."

Many artists have cited Van Vliet as an influence, beginning with the Edgar Broughton Band, who covered "Dropout Boogie" as "Apache Drop Out" in 1970, as did the Kills 32 years later. The Minutemen were fans of Beefheart, and were among the few to synthesize his music with their own–Michael Azerrad describes the Minutemen's early output as "highly caffeinated Captain Beefheart running down James Brown tunes", and notes that Beefheart was the group's "idol". Others who conveyed the same influence are John Cale of the Velvet Underground, Jack White of The White Stripes, Buzz Osborne of Melvins, Little Feat, Laurie Anderson, the Residents and Henry Cow. Industrial music pioneers Genesis P-Orridge of Throbbing Gristle and Psychic TV, and poet mystic Z'EV, cited Van Vliet and Zappa as influences. More notable were those emerging during the early days of punk rock, such as the Clash and John Lydon of the Sex Pistols. Frank Discussion of punk rock band the Feederz learned to play guitar by listening to Trout Mask Replica and Lick My Decals Off, Baby.

Cartoonist and writer Matt Groening first saw Beefheart and the Magic Band perform in the front row at the Arlene Schnitzer Concert Hall in the early 1970s. He later declared Trout Mask Replica to be the greatest album ever made. He considered the appeal of the Magic Band as outcasts who were even "too weird for the hippies". Groening served as the curator of the All Tomorrow's Parties festival that reunited the post–Beefheart Magic Band.

Van Vliet's influence on post–punk bands was demonstrated by Magazine's recording of "I Love You You Big Dummy" in 1978 and 1988's Fast 'n' Bulbous – A Tribute to Captain Beefheart, featuring the Dog Faced Hermans, the Scientists, the Membranes, Simon Fisher Turner, That Petrol Emotion, the Primevals, The Mock Turtles, XTC, and Sonic Youth, who included a cover of Beefheart's "Electricity" which would later be re-released on their 1988 album Daydream Nation. Other post-punk bands influenced by Beefheart include Gang of Four, Siouxsie and the Banshees, Pere Ubu, Babe the Blue Ox and Mark E. Smith of the Fall, who covered "Beatle Bones 'N' Smokin' Stones" in The Complete Peel Sessions 1978–2004. Beefheart is also considered to have "greatly influenced" new wave artists, such as David Byrne of Talking Heads, Blondie, Devo, the Bongos, and the B-52s.

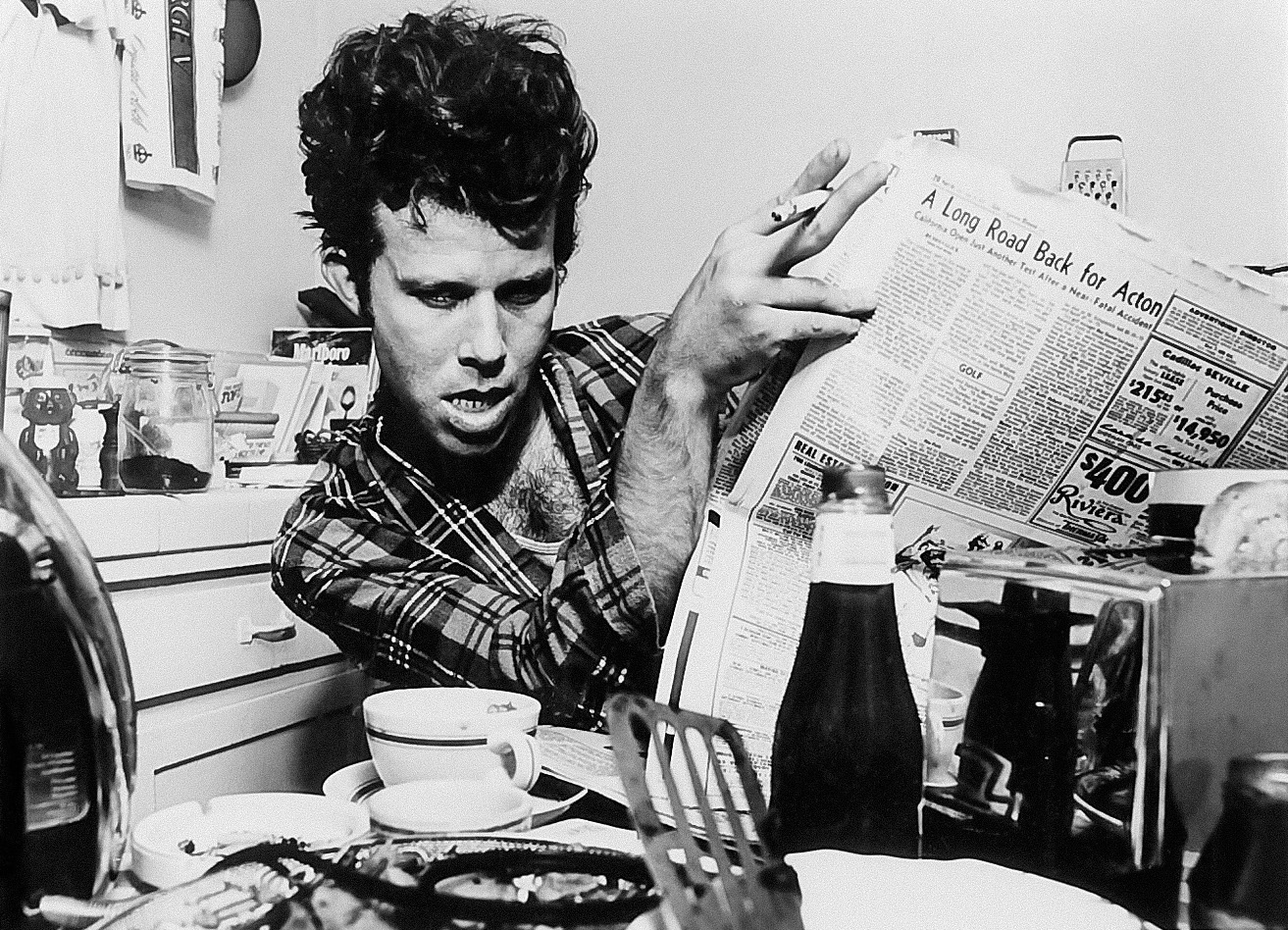
Tom Waits has cited Beefheart's music as an influence, beginning with his 1983 album Swordfishtrombones

Tom Waits' shift in artistic direction, starting with 1983's Swordfishtrombones, was, Waits claims, a result of his wife Kathleen Brennan introducing him to Van Vliet's music. "Once you've heard Beefheart", said Waits, "it's hard to wash him out of your clothes. It stains, like coffee or blood." Guitarist John Frusciante of the Red Hot Chili Peppers cited Van Vliet as a prominent influence on the band's 1991 album Blood Sugar Sex Magik as well as on his debut solo album Niandra Lades and Usually Just a T-Shirt. Black Francis of the Pixies cited Beefheart's The Spotlight Kid as one of the albums he listened to regularly when first writing songs for the band, and Kurt Cobain of Nirvana mentioned Van Vliet's among his eclectic range of influences.

In 2000, The White Stripes released "Party of Special Things to Do", containing covers of that Beefheart song plus "China Pig" and "Ashtray Heart". The Kills included a cover of "Dropout Boogie" on their debut Black Rooster EP. In 2008, The Black Keys released a free cover of Beefheart's "I'm Glad" from Safe as Milk. The LCD Soundsystem song "Losing My Edge" has a verse in which James Murphy says, "I was there when Captain Beefheart started up his first band". In 2005, Genus Records produced Mama Kangaroos – Philly Women Sing Captain Beefheart. Beck included "Safe as Milk" and "Ella Guru" in his website's Planned Obsolescence series of songs that influenced him. Franz Ferdinand cited Doc at the Radar Station as a strong influence on their LP, You Could Have It So Much Better. Placebo briefly named themselves Ashtray Heart, after the track on Doc at the Radar Station; the band's album Battle for the Sun contains the song. Joan Osborne covered Beefheart's "(His) Eyes Are a Blue Million Miles", which appears on Early Recordings. Ty Segall covered "Drop Out Boogie" on his 2009 album Lemons. PJ Harvey's first heard Beefheart's music as a child. Her parents had all of his albums; she said that listening to them made her "feel ill". At age 16, Harvey was re-introduced to Beefheart's music by John Parish. She cited him as one of her greatest influences since.

== Discography ==
- Safe as Milk (1967)
- Strictly Personal (1968)
- Trout Mask Replica (1969)
- Lick My Decals Off, Baby (1970)
- Mirror Man (1971, recorded 1967)
- The Spotlight Kid (1972)
- Clear Spot (1972)
- Unconditionally Guaranteed (1974)
- Bluejeans & Moonbeams (1974)
- Shiny Beast (Bat Chain Puller) (1978)
- Doc at the Radar Station (1980)
- Ice Cream for Crow (1982)
- Bat Chain Puller (2012, recorded 1976)

== See also ==
- Frank Zappa
- Blues
- Avant-Garde music
- The Magic Band

== Bibliography ==
- Barnes, Mike (2011). Captain Beefheart: The Biography. Omnibus Press. ISBN 978-0-85712-728-0.
- Courrier, Kevin (2007). Captain Beefheart's Trout Mask Replica. Bloomsbury Publishing USA. p. 61. ISBN 978-1-4411-9269-1.
- Christgau, Robert (1970). Capt. B. Fart. robertchristgau.com.
- Billboard (2011). Billboard. Nielsen Business Media, Inc. p. 135.
- Sheridan, Tim (April 12, 2005). "On The Arts of Don Van Vliet". Paste Magazine. Archived from the original on June 26, 2022.
