= Captain Beefheart discography =

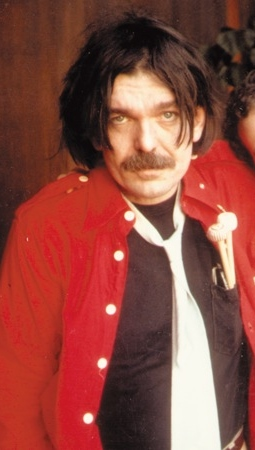
- Studio albums: 13
- Extended plays: 1
- Live albums: 3
- Compilation albums: 22
- Singles: 23

The following is a list of official releases by American musician Captain Beefheart. With various line-ups of musicians called The Magic Band, Beefheart released a total of 13 studio albums recorded between 1967 and 1982, after which he left music to concentrate on a career in painting, as Don Van Vliet. His catalogue has since been augmented with extra releases including an EP and various compilations of live material, studio outtakes and greatest hits releases.

In addition to his work with the Magic Band over this period, Beefheart also collaborated with several other musicians, most notably Frank Zappa, a friend from his teenage years with whom he worked intermittently during his musical career.

== Albums and EPs ==
=== Studio albums ===
Year	Title	Notes	Magic Band personnel	Charts	
Year	Title	Notes	Magic Band personnel	US	UK
1967	Safe as Milk	Released on June 29, 1967; Label: Buddah (US), Pye (UK)	John French; Ry Cooder; Alex St. Clair; Jerry Handley	—	—
1968	Strictly Personal	Released in October 1968; Label: Blue Thumb (US), Liberty (UK)	John French; Alex St. Clair; Jeff Cotton; Jerry Handley	—	—
1969	Trout Mask Replica	Released on June 16, 1969; Label: Straight	John French; Jeff Cotton; Bill Harkleroad; Mark Boston; Victor Hayden	—	21
1970	Lick My Decals Off, Baby	Released in December 1970; Label: Straight	John French; Bill Harkleroad; Mark Boston; Art Tripp	203	20
1971	Mirror Man	Released in April 1971 (recorded 1967); Label: Buddah	John French; Alex St. Clair; Jeff Cotton; Jerry Handley	—	49
1972	The Spotlight Kid	Released in January 1972; Label: Reprise	John French; Bill Harkleroad; Mark Boston; Art Tripp; Elliot Ingber	131	44
1972	Clear Spot	Released in October 1972; Label: Reprise	Bill Harkleroad; Mark Boston; Art Tripp; Roy Estrada	191	—
1974	Unconditionally Guaranteed	Released in April 1974; Label: Mercury (US), Virgin (UK)	Bill Harkleroad; Mark Boston; Alex St. Clair; Mark Marcellino; Art Tripp	192	—
1974	Bluejeans & Moonbeams	Released in November 1974; Label: Mercury (US), Virgin (UK)	Ira Ingber; Gene Pello; Mark Gibbons; Michael Smotherman; Jimmy Caravan; Ty Grimes; Dean Smith	—	—
1978	Shiny Beast (Bat Chain Puller)	Released in October 1978; Label: Warner (US), Virgin (UK)	Jeff Moris Tepper; Bruce Lambourne Fowler; Eric Drew Feldman; Richard Redus; Robert Arthur Williams	—	—
1980	Doc at the Radar Station	Released in August 1980; Label: Virgin	John French; Jeff Moris Tepper; Eric Drew Feldman; Bruce Lambourne Fowler; Robert Arthur Williams	203	—
1982	Ice Cream for Crow	Released in September 1982; Label: Virgin	Jeff Moris Tepper; Gary Lucas; Richard Snyder; Cliff R. Martinez	—	90
2012	Bat Chain Puller	Recorded in 1976; Label: Zappa	John French; John Thomas; Jeff Moris Tepper; Denny Walley	—	—

=== EPs ===
Year	Title	Notes	Magic Band personnel
1984	The Legendary A&M Sessions	Released in October 1984; Label: A&M; Features four tracks taken from the band's earliest singles in 1966, and a fifth track recorded in the same year	Doug Moon; Alex St. Clair; Paul Blakely; Jerry Handley

=== Live albums ===
- I'm Going to Do What I Wanna Do: Live at My Father's Place 1978 (2000)
- Live London '74 (2006)
- Amsterdam '80 (2006)
- An Ashtray Heart (2011)

=== Compilation albums ===
- The Spotlight Kid / Clear Spot (1972)
- The Spotlight Kid / Lick My Decals Off, Baby (1973)
- Captain Beefheart File (1977)
- Music in Sea Minor (1983)
- Top Secret (1984)
- Safe as Milk / Mirror Man (1988)
- Abba Zaba (1988)
- Captain Beefheart at his Best (1989)
- The Best Beefheart (1990)
- Zig Zag Wanderer: The Collection (1991)
- I May Be Hungry but I Sure Ain't Weird: The Alternative Captain Beefheart (1992)
- A Carrot Is as Close as a Rabbit Gets to a Diamond (1993)
- Zig Zag Wanderer: The Best of the Buddah Years (1996)
- Electricity (1998)
- Grow Fins: Rarities 1965–1982 (1999)
- The Mirror Man Sessions (1999)
- The Dust Blows Forward: An Anthology (1999)
- The Best of Captain Beefheart & the Magic Band (2002)
- Hot Head: Introducing Captain Beefheart (2003)
- The Buddah Years (2006)
- It Comes to You in a Plain Brown Wrapper (2008)
- Sun Zoom Spark: 1970 to 1972 (2014)

== Singles ==
Year	Single	Peak positions	Album
Year	Single	UK	Album
1966	"Diddy Wah Diddy" / "Who Do You Think You're Fooling"	—	The Legendary A&M Sessions
1966	"Moonchild" / "Frying Pan"	—	The Legendary A&M Sessions
1967	"Yellow Brick Road" / "Abba Zaba"	57 (Note: Chart position is from the official UK "Breakers List".)	Safe as Milk
1968	"Moonchild" / "Who Do You Think You're Fooling"	61	The Legendary A&M Sessions
1968	"Sure 'Nuff 'N Yes I Do" / "Yellow Brick Road"	—	Safe as Milk
1968	"Zig Zag Wanderer" / "Abba Zaba"	—	Safe as Milk
1970	"Pachuco Cadaver" / "Wild Life"	—	Trout Mask Replica
1972	"Too Much Time" / "My Head Is My Only House Unless It Rains"	—	Clear Spot
1974	"Upon the My-O-My" / "Magic Be"	—	Unconditionally Guaranteed
1978	"Sure 'Nuff 'N Yes I Do" / "Electricity"	—	Safe as Milk
1978	"Hard Workin' Man"	—	Blue Collar Soundtrack
1982	"Ice Cream for Crow" / "Light Reflected Off the Oceands of the Moon"	—	Ice Cream for Crow

=== Promotional singles ===
Year	Single	Album
1969	"Plastic Factory" / "Where There's Woman"	Safe as Milk
1972	"Click Clack" / "Glider"	The Spotlight Kid

== Other appearances ==
=== with Frank Zappa ===
- Hot Rats (1969) US No. 173
- One Size Fits All (1975) US No. 26
- Bongo Fury (1975) US No. 66
- Zoot Allures (1976) US No. 61
- You Can't Do That on Stage Anymore, Vol. 4 (1991)
- The Lost Episodes (1996)
- Mystery Disc (1998)

Beefheart may also have performed uncredited (for contractual reasons) on other Zappa albums, including Freak Out! (1966) where he can be detected playing harmonica and singing.

=== Other collaborations ===
- The Tubes, Now (1977)
- Jack Nitzsche, "Hard Workin' Man", from the film score for Blue Collar (1978)
- Gary Lucas, Improve the Shining Hour (2000)
- Moris Tepper, Moth to Mouth (2000), Head Off "Ricochet Man" (2004)
- Sings "Happy Earthday" (adaptation of "Happy Birthday to You") on the compilation Where We Live: Stand For What You Stand On, a benefit album for Earthjustice

== Films ==
- Ice Cream For Crow (1982) promotional video by Don Van Vliet, Ken Schreiber & Daniel Pearl
- Some Yo Yo Stuff (1994) Directed by Anton Corbijn
- The Artist Formerly Known as Captain Beefheart (1997) BBC Documentary
- Captain Beefheart: Under Review (2006) An Independent Critical Analysis
