= List of Jumanji episodes =

Jumanji is an American animated television series inspired by the film, which was based on the short story of the same name. The series aired from 1996 to 1999, with three seasons and forty episodes. In 1996, it was carried by the UPN Kids network, but later seasons were syndicated by BKN. The series also aired on CITV in the United Kingdom, on TRTÉ in the Republic of Ireland, and on RTR in Russia.

== Series overview ==
Season	Episodes	Originally released		
Season	Episodes	First released	Last released	Network
1	13	September 8, 1996	February 23, 1997	UPN (UPN Kids)
2	13	September 20, 1997	February 23, 1998	UPN (UPN Kids)
3	14	September 8, 1998	March 11, 1999	Syndication (Bohbot Kids Network)

== Episodes ==
=== Season 1 (1996–97) ===
No. overall	No. in season	Title	Directed by	Written by	Storyboards by	Original release date
1	1	"The Price"	Bob Hathcock & Jeff Myers	Kevin Campbell	Cash Donovan, John Holmquist, Ron Maidenburg & Steve Ressel	September 8, 1996
Two kids named Judy and Peter find a board game in their attic. After rolling the dice, they are transported into the game and receive a clue that they must solve. All the while, they meet a man named Alan that has been trapped there for twenty-three years. Clue: Clear as ice but worth the price.
2	2	"Bargaining for Time"	Cathy Malkasian	John Behnke, Rob Humphrey & Jim Peterson	Kuni Tomita, Dave Fontana, Susan Mazer & Bonita Versh	September 15, 1996
Peter and Judy return to Jumanji in their quest to save Alan. After escaping from Manjis, they and Alan encounter a trader who owns a card that could allow Alan to leave. Judy tricks the trader into taking a broken watch in exchange for the card, and Alan is allowed to leave. However, they realize that time in the real world has frozen, as Judy promised the trader that the watch keeps perfect time, but things get worse when a trio of monkeys wreak havoc in Brantford, and Peter starts transforming into a tortoise. Clue: A trick in rhyme, saves time.
3	3	"Masked Identity"	Bob Hathcock	John Behnke, Rob Humphrey & Jim Peterson	Ron Campbell	September 22, 1996
Peter is upset after the school bully and his friends trick him into retrieving their football by promising that he can play with them, but betray him and knock him into a mud puddle. He and Judy return to Jumanji with a clue which they believe means that Alan is in trouble and set out to rescue him. Clue: Someone needs to be set free, but only you have the key.
4	4	"Ransom of Redhead"	Steve Ressel	Nancy Neufeld Callaway	Peter Shin	September 29, 1996
Peter and Judy prepare to enter Jumanji, but Aunt Nora stops them because she believes the game is causing their bad grades. She throws away the dice, but accidentally rolls them and is transported into the game with them. Alan saves Peter and Judy from a giant, lizard, but when Aunt Nora appears, she lands on the lizard's back and is captured when it is caught in one of Van Pelt's traps. Peter, Judy, and Alan search for her, and along the way, a large python and a pack of piranhas attack them. Clue: The more you learn, the less you know, and that's the only way to go.
5	5	"Master Builder"	Bob Hathcock	Steve Roberts	Cash Donovan, Bill Dubay, Butch Hartman, John Holmquist & Eduardo Olivares	October 13, 1996
During another visit to Jumanji, Judy and Peter gets attacked by Van Pelt until Alan saved and heads up a cliff they end up being attacked by giant bees. Peter reveals that he brought Judy's laptop with him to solve Alan's clue, but she instead has Alan describe everything he learned in Jumanji to come up with a solution. That night, as "Berbalangs" attack, an Ibsen takes them to his laboratory and reveals that he creates Jumanji's machines and sends a daily report to "Jumanji". Judy connects the laptop to a mainframe computer, giving it the ability to analyze Jumanji and predict the future, revealing that a flash flood will strike. The trio flee to higher ground as the Ibsen steals the laptop and uses it to create monsters and reshape the terrain, a power which he claims makes him Jumanji's ruler. They reach his lab and try to retrieve the laptop, but his machines attack them. Peter realizes that their clue is connected to how to stop the computer, which it tries to answer but cannot, causing it to shut down along with the Ibsen, who is revealed to be a machine and not the real one. His factory is destroyed and Peter and Judy return home. At home, Judy offers that Peter can use the computer to help him finish his homework, but he declines. Clue: Can make fish swim
6	6	"No Dice"	Steve Ressel	Neil Alsip	Cash Donovan, Bill Dubay, Butch Hartman, Eduardo Olivares & Andy Thom	October 27, 1996
Peter crosses a gorge on a vine to retrieve a doll from a Jumanji tiger to solve their clue, but nearly drowns after the vine breaks. As they return home, Alan steals the dice to prevent them from playing Jumanji, which has put them in danger. They try using dice from other games to return to Jumanji; after this fails, they damage and insult it, which works; however, as punishment, Peter is transformed into a toucan. Clue(s): The tiger's prize.
7	7	"Love on the Rocks"	Cathy Malkasian	Nancy Neufeld Callaway	John Dorman & David Steele	November 3, 1996
Judy wants to go to the dance with Wade, a boy she likes, but is heartbroken after he tricks her into doing his homework. She does not want to play Jumanji again, but accidentally rolls the dice. Upon arriving in Jumanji, Alan hears of their clue and takes them to a room with many doors. After two wrong attempts, Judy is saved from falling down a hole by a Flint, who is from behind the third door. He takes them to his castle in the clouds, but Alan is suspicious of this new guy. While investigating a forbidden room, Alan and Peter find statues of several of Jumanji's inhabitants, including Slick. An eagle attacks Judy, but the Flint turns it to stone and Alan realizes that Jumanji created him to be the perfect boyfriend for Judy and influenced her behavior. The Flint murders Peter by turning him to stone, but Judy, now normal, kills him by reflecting his attack back at him, causing the statues to return to normal and the castle to disintegrate. Judy realizes that she solved the clue, which was warning her about the Flint. At home, Judy gives Wade his homework and it is revealed that she set him up to fail because she no longer loves him. Clue: When what you want's behind the door, be careful what you're wishing for.
8	8	"Law of Jumanji"	Bob Hathcock	John Behnke, Rob Humphrey & Jim Peterson	Ron Campbell	November 17, 1996
Upon arriving in Jumanji, they learn that Alan plans to eliminate Van Pelt. As he is hunting monkeys, they set a trap, but he does not fall for it and attacks them. Alan and Peter defeat him by throwing him into a bottomless pit. Peter and Judy return home, but soon after, Peter begins to go into mysterious evil trances, seeing cars, people and objects as blood-thirsty animals. After the Rock and his friends bully him in class, he attacks them before fleeing. Judy follows him to their house, where she is shocked to see him first transforming into an early stage of Van Pelt. She tries to take him to Jumanji, but nothing happens when she rolls the dice, and she realizes that the turn is not over. Upon returning to Jumanji, they learn that the law of Jumanji states that there must always be a hunter, and if they are defeated, the victor takes their place. A now full grown Peter hunts down Alan and Judy while riding on an elephant, but Alan distracts him and throws the swagger stick into the bottomless pit. Peter returns back to normal after that event. Clue: A hunting you will go, but will that defeat the foe.
9	9	"Stormy Weather"	Bob Hathcock	John Behnke, Rob Humphrey & Jim Peterson	Ron Campbell	November 24, 1996
Aunt Nora is having guests over, but comes home to find the house a mess and demands that Peter and Judy clean up the mess, but they argue about it. Upon arriving in Jumanji, they are in front of Alan's house, and giant beetles attack them. After a bolt of lightning strikes and kills Alan by blasting him, Slick gives them the ChronoRepeater, which allows them to turn back time. After several unsuccessful attempts to save Alan, which involve attempting to use Professor Ibsen's lightning rod, a rope, and the Manjis War Canoe to save him, the ChronoRepeater falls off a cliff and is destroyed. On their last attempt, Peter and Judy put aside their differences and work together to save Alan using the three objects, but a tornado sucks them out of the canoe. Professor Ibsen appears and suggests that Alan lasso the lightning rod, which pulls them out of the tornado and sends them back to Alan's home. The storm ends, and Peter and Judy realize that by working together, they have solved the clue and can return home. They clean the living room in time for the guests to arrive, and Nora congratulates them on their hard work. Clue: Failure looms but who's to blame, set it right or repeat the game.
10	10	"El Pollo Jumanji"	Jeff Myers	Tom J. Astle	John Ahern & Joy Kolitski	February 2, 1997
Peter tries to talk to a girl named Maria, who the Rock claims is his girlfriend. In Jumanji, Peter uses a jar containing a swarm of bees to fend off porcupines and monkeys, which solves their clue and allows them to return home. However, the Rock attacks Peter after he tries to impress Maria with Jumanji, causing the dice to roll out of his pocket and transporting him and Judy, along with the Rock and Maria, into Jumanji, and Peter is transformed into a warthog. A swarm of meat-eating butterflies, a tiger and a chicken attack them, but the Rock helps save them. Clue(s): It's not so funny to waste some honey/Lose the battle and win the war, it's what best enemies are for.
11	11	"Perfect Match"	Steve Ressel	John Behnke, Rob Humphrey & Jim Peterson	Todd Britton, Jeremy Dubrow, John Gibson, Eduardo Olivares, David Teague & Andy Thom	February 9, 1997
Peter, Judy, and Aunt Nora become lost while heading to a wedding and Peter attempts to play Jumanji to pass the time, causing the car to be transported into the landscape within them. When they arrive, Queen Gina, the queen of the Jamazons, is pursuing Alan, as she wants to marry him. Peter and Judy assume that the clue means that if he marries her, he will be freed from Jumanji. They help to trap Alan, but he reveals that the wedding involves a human sacrifice of the groom. The three decide to have Alan pose as Aunt Nora's fiancé to prevent him from marrying Gina. This plan nearly works, but the blind date is interrupted after Gina takes everyone prisoner. Gina marries Alan and is about to kill him when Aunt Nora frees herself and fights her one-on-one. Clue: Someone's freedom is foreseen, through a match-up with the Queen.
12	12	"Gift"	Cathy Malkasian	Neil Alsip	Joy Kolitski & David Steele	February 16, 1997
In Jumanji, Peter and Judy celebrate Alan's birthday with a picnic. When giant centipedes attack them, one bites Alan and the venom threatens to kill him if it reaches his heart. Peter vows to destroy the game if Alan dies, which Stalker overhears and enlists the Slick, the Van Pelt, and the Ibsen to help him kill them to protect Jumanji. As Alan rests in a magic pool that shows his dreams in the water, Peter attempts to trick Jumanji by pretending that his hat is what he most adores, but is punished by being transformed into a frog. Clue: Release the thing you most adore, it comes back closer than before.
13	13	"Truth or Consequently"	Bob Hathcock, Jeff Myers & Steve Ressel	Christopher Bird	Jeff Myers, Steve Ressel & Scott Wood	February 23, 1997
Peter makes up a story about why he does not have his homework, which causes him to be sent to the principal's office. Later, upon arriving in Jumanji, they find an egg that had fallen from a tree and hatches into a lemur. as the group flees from Van Pelt and later a mosquito, they take the right path, which seemingly solves their clue and allows them to leave. Because of this and that there are seemingly no consequences, Judy believes that the clues may be repeating and that their clue was Alan's. However, the lemur has gone to the real world with them and becomes a huge lemur each time Peter lies, and over time also multiplies in number. Aunt Nora and Officer Bentley encounter one of the lemurs as it is eating Peter's backpack. While they manage to trap the lemur in the gym, they grow again and escape after Peter lies to Rock. Peter ultimately defeats the large lemur by revealing his lies, causing them to return to normal size and be returned to Jumanji along with Alan. Peter and Judy promise to free him again, but for good. Clue: As this becomes more of a pest, the right path is in truth the best.

=== Season 2 (1997–98) ===
No. overall	No. in season	Title	Directed by	Written by	Storyboards by	Original release date
14	1	"The Red and the Black"	Bob Hathcock	Peter Gaffney	Dave Arnett, Debbie Baber, Joe Denton, Dan Kubat & Bryan Maille	September 21, 1997
Peter and Judy arrive as a flash flood forces them to flee. After the storm passes, they are caught up in a war between black and red ants. The Red Ants capture Peter and bring him to their Queen, who believes he is a spy; however, he proves his innocence with help from the ant that captured him. The Red Queen sends soldiers after Judy and Alan as it is revealed that the Black Ants and Red Ants hate each other due to conflict over the Black Bahoot and Red Bahoot. As the Black Ants and Red Ants prepare for battle, Judy and Alan sneak into the Red Ants' anthill to rescue Peter, but he refuses to leave out of loyalty to them. He claims that they are spies for the Black Ants, causing the Queen to imprison them. The battle begins, and Peter steals the Bahoot and frees Alan and Judy in an effort to stop the war. They use the Bahoot to get the ants' attention and lead them to the river, where they escape. This solves the clue and sends Judy and Peter home. Clue: The river is long.
15	2	"Eye of the Sea"	Scott Wood	Steve Roberts	Bob Foster, Joy Kolitsky, Dan Kubat, Bryan Maille & Joe Orrantia	September 28, 1997
Upon arriving in Jumanji, Peter and Judy arrive on the shore of a sea with a pirate ship nearby. They and Alan board the ship and meet the pirate Ishmael Squint, who plans to sail to the Eye of Jumanji, a portal that leads out of Jumanji, and wants them to be his crew. After a day at sea, Peter is promoted to first mate and takes advantage of his new position to order Alan and Judy around. In the graveyard of ships, two electric eels attack them, and after Peter and Alan defeat them, Squint changes his mind about Alan. While searching for Squint some time later, he confronts them and reveals that what he is really after is Nolda, a one-eyed sea monster that he seeks to kill as revenge for her eating his nose. Nolda attacks and eats him as Alan, Peter, and Judy climb the crow's nest and Alan jumps into Nolda's eye and stabs her with his sword, killing her. Clue: X marks the spot, the map holds the key, the shaft finds its mark, the I of the C.
16	3	"Brantford: The Game"	Scott Wood	Patricia Carr & Lara Olsen	Butch Hartman, Joy Kolitsy, Joe Orrantia & Andy Thom	October 5, 1997
Judy is made fun of in math class after answering a math problem incorrectly. Upon returning home, she and Peter enter Jumanji and Alan takes them to the Temple of the Skiwans, whose inhabitants found a way out of the game. After giant cockroaches attack them, they escape into a secret passageway and find Brantford: The Game, which is seemingly a Brantford version of Jumanji. After Alan rolls, they get their clue and enter another version of Brantford, where they encounter a scary-looking Aunt Nora and a mean, giant version of the neighborhood dog. While searching for the answer to the clue, they encounter Manji versions of the Rock and his friends, as well as Van Bentley, an alternate version of Officer Bentley like Van Pelt. They believe that the two clues are two parts of one clue and head to the observatory, which is Brantford's highest point. There, a version of Judy's teacher who is like the Ibsen captures them and gives them a problem to solve, since Brantford requires brain power to be beaten. Judy realizes that the question is the same as the one she was given earlier and answers it, solving both clues and allowing Alan to return to Jumanji and them to return home. Clue(s): Solving problems is a game, the highest point should be your aim/Knowledge is key to this illusion, ignorance is no solution.
17	4	"Air Judy"	Tom McLaughlin	Neil Alsip	Dave Arnett, Debbie Baber, Rachel Brenner, Declan Moran & Eduardo Olivares	October 12, 1997
In Jumanji, an airplane crashes and Peter and Judy meet its pilot, Dottie. A hailstorm forces them to land on a cloud concealing a village of Jumaki, who are hostile towards them until Judy saves one of their eggs. The Fervish explains that a black ghost of the sky has been attacking them and taking their eggs and that the egg Judy saved is his child. The spirit of the sky appears and is revealed to be the Ibsen's blimp, which the group attempts to destroy, but are captured as Ibsen reveals his plans to use the Jumakis to power his machines. The group notices a hole in the sky and realizes that Dottie entered Jumanji through it as she leaves. Judy rallies the Jumakis to attack the blimp while Peter rescues the eggs, and the blimp is destroyed after the panels of Jumanji's fake sun reflect its attack at it. Afterwards, the Fervish thanks them for saving them and giving them back their ability to fly. With their clue solved, Peter and Judy leave as the Fervish's egg hatches and he decides to name the baby a fake Judy in her honor. Back home, the real Judy turns in her science project, and Dottie is revealed to have returned safely. Clue: Without wings you soar so high, now you must help the birds to fly.
18	5	"The Palace of Clues"	Andy Thom & Scott Wood	Peter Elwell	Andy Thom, Joy Kolitsly, Joe Orrantia & Bob Taylor	October 19, 1997
Upon arriving in Jumanji, Slick gives Alan a can of paint to paint his house with, but tells him he must repay him by doing odd jobs for him. Soon after, adventurer Ashton Phillips invites them to accompany him to the Palace of Lost Clues, which contains clues from past Jumanji players. While Judy is suspicious of him and Alan is reluctant to go because of his debt to Slick, Ashton convinces them to go. Despite him abandoning them in pursuit of treasure, they manage to reach the palace. However, Peter turns to ice when they find a statue with rubies for eyes, which illuminates what appears to be Alan's clue. Before anyone can read the clue, however, Ashton removes the rubies, causing the palace to collapse and Peter to shatter. However, he returns to normal when the rubies fall on his eyes, and the group escapes with the rubies while the palace collapses. Alan uses the rubies to pay off his debt, which solves the clue and sends Peter and Judy home. At home, they reveal that they bought Aunt Nora her birthday cake instead of movie tickets as they planned. Clue: When you fix what has been broken, then you'll know the eyes have spoken.
19	6	"The Master of the Game"	David Schwartz	Peter Gaffney	Bob Foster, Dan Kubat, Bryan Maille & Michael Docherty	October 26, 1997
Upon arriving in Jumanji, the group is crossing the Great Desert of Jumanji to solve Peter and Judy's clue when they run out of fuel and have to travel on foot to a nearby oasis, where a voice suddenly speaks to them in riddles and tells them that they have a final test. Following the riddles leads them to what appears to be a gate to Brantford, but when they try to pass through it, they are sent back to where they started and realize that the gate is another illusion. Tracking down the source of the voice that gave them the riddles, they meet a man who calls himself the Master of Jumanji and reveals that he, like Alan, became trapped in Jumanji because he was unable to figure out his clue - the Gateless Gate. After Alan tells him that the Gate is just another illusion, the Master realizes his error, solving his clue and sending him home. Peter and Judy also return home, with Alan assuring them that he still has hope he can return home after seeing the Master do so. Clue: Beyond shifting sands the answer lies.
20	7	"Robo-Peter"	Bob Foster	Steve Roberts	Ray Brown, Joe Denton, Eduardo Olivares, Joe Orrantia & Andy Thom	November 2, 1997
Peter is forbidden from leaving home until he finishes his homework, so he decides to go to Jumanji to have fun. Alan takes Peter to the Ibsen's lab and, despite Peter being suspicious of him, assures him that Ibsen has changed his ways. The Ibsen suddenly reveals a robot-transformed version of Peter as Robo-Peter and suggests that he will go to Brantford in his place, which the real Peter agrees to. While Robo-Peter does the chores and schoolwork in Brantford, while the real Peter has fun in Jumanji with a robotic dog he calls "Spike". However, he later discovers a robotic version of Judy and Ibsen captures him, revealing that he plans to trap Earth's population in Jumanji and replace them with robotic versions of them. However, Peter is unable to escape and warn anyone because the robotic Peter already solved his clue to leave. The fake Peter invites a group of students to play Jumanji, but Judy tricks him into rolling the dice. They are transported into Jumanji, where Alan and the real Peter escape with Spike's help. Alan destroys Ibsen's power generator and the group uses his controller to turn the robotic people against him, with him promising revenge as he escapes. Spike becomes Alan's pet and Peter and Judy are sent home. Clue(s): The grass looks greener across the river wide, a simple stick leads to the other side/Blind obedience brings disaster, until the servant turns on the master.
21	8	"Mud Boy"	Dave Schwartz	Neil Alsip	Joe Denton, Dan Kubat & Michael Docherty	November 9, 1997
Judy is practicing her violin for a recital later that night. They later enter Jumanji and arrive in the Jumanji Bayou, where they meet with Alan. After hearing their clue, he thinks that it could refer to the Dirt Mines on the other side of the Bayou. Peter draws a young organism in the mud that comes to life and names it Mud Boy, which he brings with them. At the Dirt Mines, Peter is separated from Judy and Alan and reunites with Mud Boy, and they head off to find Judy and Alan. Mud Boy decides to get rid of Alan and Judy so he and Peter can have fun forever and leaves to find them after sticking Peter to a wall. Alan and Judy nearly drown in a mud river, but Peter manages to free himself and save them. Mud Boy grows to giant size to chase them, but Peter stops him by creating Mud Girl to be his sister. Mud Boy returns to normal and leaves with Mud Girl. With their clue solved, Peter and Judy return home and he decides to go to her recital. Clue: Fools draw ruin from the earth, the only hope a magic birth.
22	9	"The Magic Chest"	Tom McLaughlin	Patricia Carr	Rachel Brenner, Dave Arnett, Warren Greenwood, Declan Moran, Tom McLaughlin & Eduardo Olivares	November 16, 1997
Upon arriving in Jumanji, Alan takes them to the Sand King's castle, where they discover a treasure chest and meet the Sand King, who is searching for a magic chest and, believing that they have it, sends his men after them. While fleeing, they fall through quicksand and return to Brantford, where Judy realizes that the treasure chest is the magic chest. The chest's coins cause those who touch one to turn into an animal, including Peter, the shopkeeper, Aunt Nora, and Mr. Olsen, who all turn into a skunk, a rhinoceros, an ostrich, and an elephant. After retrieving the chest from Olsen, they return to Jumanji and realize that throwing the chest into the ocean will break the curse. However, Trader Slick steals it, and while Peter forces him to return it, he takes the coins. The Sand King confronts them after discovering that the chest is empty, but Peter kills him with his squirt gun. He then throws the chest into the ocean, returning them to normal. Clue: A crumbling kingdom brings a trap to light. Fathom greed's curse to make things right.
23	10	"The Trial"	Bob Foster	Jonathan Greenberg	Joy Kolitsky, Joe Orrantia & Llyn Hunter	November 23, 1997
Peter and Judy enter Jumanji as Aunt Nora is angry at a plumber for seemingly breaking a vase. They meet with Alan, who saves a glass orb from going over a cliff, only to be captured by monkeys and brought before the Judge, who charges him with stealing the orb. After he is imprisoned and Peter and Judy learn that he will be put on trial, they attempt to defend him and later free him. When Judy questions Alan, they are the only ones who believe his story and he is found guilty. As punishment, Peter is exiled to Desperation Island, where he befriends a Fludgel named Eep, and Alan and Judy are captured while trying to free him. Alan reveals what he had tried to tell the Judge; he had lied to protect a Fludgel, which he found along with the orb. Peter and Judy forgive him for lying, but the Judge decides to execute them. However, Eep returns and exchanges an orb for their freedom to repay Peter's kindness. This solves their clue and sends them home, where it is implied that a cat broke the vase. Clue: Let the judgment fit the crime. An act of kindness may come in time.
24	11	"The Riddle of Alan"	Tom McLaughlin	Peter Gaffney	Eduardo Olivares, Declan Moran, Warren Greenwood & Chuck Harvey	February 9, 1998
Peter is upset that Alan is being overprotective and refuses to return to Jumanji, but Judy forces him to and they search for Alan, but cannot find him. They head to the Ruins of the Faceless Statue and discover that it appears to be of Jumanji. Before they can investigate, the Manjis confront them for being on what they consider to be sacred ground, but flee after lightning strikes. Soon after, Peter and Judy find Alan, who has lost his memories, and bring him to the ruins in hopes of helping him regain them. They later discover a steamship in the ruins and use it to travel upriver. That night, a sleepwalking Alan destroys the boat, but he remembers that he came to the river to follow a Manji legend about finding the truth at the head of the river. Clue: Find the truth so long concealed, when the hidden face has been revealed.
25	12	"Night of the Hunters"	Andy Thom	John Ziaucus	Dave Arnett, Rachel Brenner & Bryan Maille	February 16, 1998
After Peter and Judy are selling raffle tickets and Peter sells some to Mr. Kinderman, they decide to enter Jumanji. There, Van Pelt attacks them, but his rival Von Richter stops him from killing them and suggests that they compete to hunt Alan. Von Richter captures Peter and Judy and promises to release them if Alan can make it through the compound, but they escape. Although Peter is captured, Von Richter decides to let him go and he frees one of his injured eagles. Alan is nearly caught, but escapes as they are arguing and Alan saves Pelt. Clue: Double crossing makes no friends, the Wings of Eagles make amends.
26	13	"The Plague"	Scott Wood	Marsha Freeman	Joy Kolitsky, Joe Orrantia, Ray Brown & Michael Docherty	February 23, 1998
Peter decides to enter Jumanji despite being sick with a fever, and they find a pearl in a clam's mouth, which they believe to be the answer to their clue. They decide to take Peter to the Manjis to treat his illness, with Tribal Bob believing that the clue refers to a statue that needs the pearl to prevent a volcanic eruption. After Alan puts the pearl into the statue, their clue is solved and they return home, but the Manjis begin to show signs of Peter's illness. At home, a doctor treats Peter and reveals that his illness is Norwegian Pluracy. Judy tricks him into rolling the dice, causing him to be transported into Jumanji with them. Alan reveals that he and the Manjis have contracted Norwegian Pluracy. Tribal Bob believes that the doctor is a witch doctor and caused their illness and plans to kill him and the group. Peter and Judy later rescue him and disguise him to have him treat the Manjis, which solves their clue and allows them to return home. They convince him that the events were a dream and Peter later recovers, only for Judy to get sick soon after. Clue(s): All that glitters is not gold, but leads you to the bead she must hold/Undercover is the catch. Turn around and down the hatch.

=== Season 3 (1998–99) ===
No. overall	No. in season	Title	Directed by	Written by	Storyboards by	Original release date
27	1	"The Three Peters"	Gloria Jenkins	Marsha F. Griffin	Dave Arnett, Ray Brown, Declan Moran & Brian Tribble	September 8, 1998
After Peter kicks the game in frustration, the glass dome shatters into three pieces. Upon arriving in Jumanji, he and Judy are attacked by two giant slugs, but Alan saves them. They soon discover that Peter has been transformed into three versions of himself: Mean Peter, Scared Peter, and Nice Peter. After rescuing the bad Peter from Van Pelt, Alan and Judy learn that the Manjis have captured the good Peter and the frightened Peter, intending to sacrifice them. After noticing an approaching storm, Judy realizes the significance of the clue and gathers the three Peters together to be struck by lightning, fusing them back into normal. This solves the clue and allows them to return home, where Peter has no memory of the events and the game has repaired itself. Clue: Woeful pieces of a broken soul await the strike that makes them whole.
28	2	"Young Alan"	David Schwartz	Peter Gaffney	Jeff Allen, Shavonne Cherry, Bryan Maille & David Steele	September 15, 1998
Professor Ibsen, who has been transformed into a giant frog, sends Peter and Judy back in time in hopes that he can eliminate them at his full strength. When they arrive in the past, they meet a young boy who has recently arrived in Jumanji. After escaping from the past Ibsen and teaching the boy some of the survival skills they learned from Alan in the present, they learn that his name is Alan and realize that they are in the past. With seemingly no way to return to the present, they initially accept that they are trapped in the past. However, the young Alan hears them and buys a boat from Trader Slick as they return to the present. After the real Alan saves them from a waterfall, they learn from him that Ibsen had gotten a cure for his transformation from Trader Slick, but it shrunk him and turned him blue. This solves the clue and returns them home, where Peter goes to play with an old toy he found, but ends up breaking it. Clue: No past, no future, we know it is true. And yet the present makes you blue.
29	3	"The Intruder"	Andy Thom	Peter Gaffney	Dave Arnett, Lisa Baytos, Dan Kubat & Brian Tribble	September 22, 1998
When a mugger breaks into the attic, Peter, in desperation, rolls the dice, causing the mugger to be transported into Jumanji with them. Upon arriving in Jumanji, the mugger, now named Jack, continues to search for valuables as they flee. When Jack catches Peter again and is about to leave him to die, Peter lies that Van Pelt has emeralds, which intrigues him enough that he saves him instead. After seemingly killing Alan and threatening Judy, Jack sends Peter to get the emeralds, but instead he gets a chest in order to bargain for Judy's safety. Alan reappears and saves Judy, and when Van Pelt appears, he reveals that the chest contains an Arsinoitherium horn, which he claims is the last of its kind. However, a live Juroceros appears and saves the group from Van Pelt, only for Jack to try to steal the horn. Upon recovering it, the clue is solved and Peter, Judy, and Jack are returned home, where Officer Bentley, who came to investigate the house after noticing a broken window, arrests Jack. Clue: Your view is askew, your morals are stunted; till you see the robber robbed and the hunter hunted.
30	4	"Oh, Grow Up!"	Gloria Jenkins	Marsha F. Griffin	Dave Arnett, Ray Brown, Declan Moran & Brian Tribble	September 29, 1998
Peter, who is upset that he is not tall enough to ride a new roller coaster, enters Jumanji with Judy. Upon arriving in Jumanji, they are attacked by a group of pigs, but Alan saves them. After encountering Trader Slick, Peter trades him a rabbit's foot for a growth potion, and grows to giant size, allowing him to fend off a lynx and the pigs when they attack the group. While his size is helpful at first, it also causes problems, as he accidentally destroys the Manji village while fighting a giant monitor lizard that was attacking them. Judy and Alan coerce Slick into giving them the antidote for free, and he warns them that only three drops are needed. Peter drinks the entire bottle, causing him to shrink to a tiny size, and when the three tries to find Slick again, he has left. After realizing that the last part of their clue refers to what is left of the growth potion, Peter drinks it and is restored to normal size. This solves the clue and allows Peter and Judy to return home, but Peter left behind his left shoe, which Tribal Bob now lives in. Clue: One small trade makes fortunes rise, but what remains is just your size.
31	5	"Return of Squint"	Andy Thom	Peter Gaffney	Lisa Baytos, Rachel Brenner & Dan Kubat	January 7, 1999
Peter is on the swim team, but is unable to keep up with the other kids. He and Judy later enter Jumanji, where Alan saves them from a group of salamanders, but some of their slime gets on Peter and begins to transform him into a salamander. The group steals a submarine from Ibsen's lab and later encounter Squint, who orders them to help him find a sunken city and its treasure, but the submarine ruptures after he does not listen to the warnings. Alan and Judy survive by wearing scuba suits, while Peter, having fully transformed into a salamander, is now able to breathe underwater. The three find the treasure, but Squint attacks them, only for two mermaids to trap him and his crew. Alan and Judy find a balloon-like plant that can lift them to the surface, but are forced to leave the treasure behind, as it is too heavy to carry. After returning to the surface, Peter returns to normal, and with the clue solved, he and Judy return home. Back at home, Peter uses the skills he learned to impress his swim team. Clue: A machine will take you to the deep. But cannot tell you what to keep.
32	6	"Armageddon"	David Schwartz	Steve Roberts	Dave Arnett, Ray Brown, Declan Moran & Brian Tribble	January 14, 1999
As Judy prepares to meet a boy named Dashell and Peter practices for his Little League team, they hear Alan calling for help and return to Jumanji to meet with him. He explains that while they were gone, Jumanji transformed into a more peaceful land. Soon after, however, they are attacked by Manjis, which confuses him. After more incidents, the group decides to question Ibsen to see if he knows anything. At first, he is unable to give them any answers, saying only that he believes there is something wrong with Jumanji itself. However, after trying to find a solution elsewhere, they question Ibsen again after his laboratory lands near them. He tells them that a mechanism is broken, so they travel through the Bog of Despair and into Jumanji's inner depths. After finding a broken gear, they rig up a pulley to fix it, and Alan realizes that releasing the pulley will fix the problem and send them home, but also kill him. However, they manage to release it and save him anyway. With the clue solved and Jumanji back to normal, Peter and Judy return home, where Judy leaves to apologize to Dashell for being late. Clue: There's one way out, the price you know. Save yourselves and let it go.
33	7	"Love Potion"	Andy Thom	Siobhan Byrne O'Connor	Lisa Baytos, Mike Borkowski, Rachel Brenner & Dan Kubat	January 21, 1999
Judy tries to ask a boy named Wade Riley out to the school dance, but another girl who also wants to ask him out interrupts her. At home, she and Peter enter Jumanji and go to Slick's shop to get a boltcutter to help Alan return a baby gazelle to her herd. As Alan heads to get the payment, Slick gives Judy a love potion perfume which causes Alan and later Van Pelt to fall in love with her. As they fight over Judy, the gazelle is returned to her herd, which solves the clue and returns Peter and Judy home. However, the love potion causes the boys in school to fight over Judy. After Peter saves her from a mob of boys, they head home and enter Jumanji again in search of a cure. After saving Judy from the Manjis, who want her to be their Queen, they encounter Slick again and trick him into giving them the antidote. This solves the clue and returns Peter and Judy home, after which Judy decides to get ice cream instead of dwelling on the dance. Clue(s): A rescue formed for one in need, will soon in kind repay the deed/Desire and love falsely derived, can only be saved by what's inside.
34	8	"Sorceress of Jumanji"	David Schwartz	Greg Klein and Tom Pugsley	Jeff Allen, Shavonne Cherry, David Steele & Curt Walstead	January 28, 1999
Peter and Judy learn that Aunt Nora is having a yard sale and sold Jumanji to their neighbor, Mrs. Desmona. After going to her house to ask for it back, she becomes grumpy and turns them away. As they leave, they witness her being transported into the game and decide to enter Jumanji to protect her. She later steals a spellbook called the Tome of Jumanji from Slick, leading her to become the Sorceress of Jumanji and kidnap Peter to be her apprentice. After learning of the castle where the original Sorceress lived, Alan and Judy travel there to save Peter. Judy obtains the Tome and transforms into the Sorceress, causing Ms. Desmona to return to normal and apologize for her actions. This solves her clue and sends her home, and with Peter and Judy's clue also solved, they return home as well. Back in Brantford, Ms. Desmona returns the game and a football she took from Peter. Judy demands that she return the other toys she stole, which she initially refuses, but changes her mind. Clue(s): Evil spoken will not amend.
35	9	"The Ultimate Weapon"	Gloria Jenkins	Barry Hawkins	Dave Arnett, Ray Brown, Declan Moran & Brian Tribble	February 4, 1999
Peter's friend Donny is moving away, and in an attempt to forget his sadness, Peter decides to enter Jumanji with Judy. Upon arriving in Jumanji, they find Van Pelt, Squint, The Judge, and Ibsen, attending Slick's auction, which Alan tells them is to sell a product to Jumanji's villains. The group disguise themselves to infiltrate the auction and learn that Slick is selling the Trans-Vector, a device which can open a portal to another world, which he demonstrates by sending a rhinoceros there. They try to grab the artifact, but Van Pelt sends Alan to the other world and Peter and Judy team up with Ibsen, who reveals that he wants to destroy the Trans-Vector. Peter and Judy manage to free Alan, only for a creature from the other world to escape into Jumanji. After realizing the meaning of the clue, Judy tells Peter to throw the Trans-Vector into the creature's mouth, which explodes and destroys it, solving their clue and returning them home. Later, Peter writes an email to Donny, having decided to keep in touch with him. Clue: Though worlds apart friendship's your guide. When all seems hopeless, toss it inside.
36	10	"Who Am I?"	Bob Hathcock	Tom Pugsley & Greg Klein	Jeff Allen, Shavonne Cherry, Bryan Maille & David Steele	February 11, 1999
On a rainy day, Peter is practicing baseball but is not doing well, so Judy tries to teach him. After Peter accidentally breaks the attic window, they decide to play Jumanji. Upon arriving in Jumanji, it is a beautiful day with a rainbow, but the rainbow turns into a ball of lightning that chases them and causes them to switch bodies, which they soon realize has also happened to Alan and Van Pelt. When they go to Slick for answers, he reveals that he sold Ibsen the Tri-Jumiante Prism, a device that can switch things around. They head to Ibsen's lab, where they are caught in a trap, but Judy activates the Prism using Peter's baseball to throw a curveball. This time, Peter and Slick, a chimp and Judy, and Ibsen and Peter switch bodies. Judy switches on the Prism again, but accidentally breaks the on-off lever, causing the Prism to explode, destroying Ibsen's lab and returning everything to normal. With their clue solved, Peter and Judy return home and Peter uses the curveball he learned from Judy to win a game for his Little League team. Clue: Mirrors reflect, but not what's inside. Problems are solved from the other side.
37	11	"Nothing to Fear"	Andy Thom	Marsha F. Griffin	Lisa Baytos, Mike Borkowski, Rachel Brenner & Dan Kubat	February 18, 1999
Upon arriving in Jumanji, Alan sees a vision of himself as an old man before being attacked by cockroaches that disappear after Peter attacks them. They realize that Ibsen may be behind what is happening and head to his lab, where he reveals that he created a machine called the Triangle of Terror that can bring nightmares to life. Alan sees a nightmare of Judy's future self having her daughter be babysat on her birthday as she and Peter try to free Alan and another of his own grave, but Peter and Judy snap him out of it. After realizing that confronting their fears will make them disappear, they head to his lab. They plan to reflect the beams to destroy the machine, but Ibsen appears and sets it to full power, causing their worst fears to appear. Judy realizes that they must destroy the machine to make them disappear and they reflect the energy beams onto the machine, causing it to overload and destroying it. The nightmares disappear and the machine comes to life and chases Ibsen. With their clue solved, they return home, with Alan's faith in returning home restored after defeating his nightmare. Clue: What lies before your eyes is sure. Reflection makes your vision pure
38	12	"The Doll"	Dave Schwartz	Steve Roberts	Jeff Allen, Shavonne Cherry, David Steele and Curt Walstead	February 25, 1999
In Jumanji, Peter attempts to cross a river below a cliff but is swept away and washes ashore, where the Manjis have their witch doctor revive him using a voodoo doll. After he steals the doll, the Manjis chase them and one attacks Peter with a spear, but it hits his songbook. With their clue solved, they return home, where Peter uses the doll to take revenge on his teacher, baseball coach, Rock's gang, and Aunt Nora. After Judy learns of this and tries to stop him, Peter uses one of her hairs on the doll and puts it into the fridge, causing her to turn to ice. He decides to return to Jumanji to ask the witch doctor for help and returns the doll to them, but the doll does not work without the ruby in its chest, which had fallen off without him noticing. Peter and Alan head to a mud dauber's nest to retrieve a ruby, which forms from the heat. He gives it to the witch doctor and they put it in its place on the doll, which causes it to glow. This solves the clue and he returns home, where Judy has returned to normal. Clue(s): Take what you will, though it will be wrong. Your only hope will come in a song/A chilling lesson will leave its trace until the red glows in its place
39	13	"An Old Story"	Andy Thom	Tony Schillaci	Lisa Baytos, Mike Borkowski, Rachel Brenner, Dan Kubat & Brian Tribble	March 4, 1999
Aunt Nora hires a babysitter named Sally to watch Peter and Judy while she goes out on a date. Upon arriving in Jumanji, they escape from a whirlpool and save Alan from the cocoon of a caterpillar. They convince him to get rid of his Glaze Berries, which solves their clue and allows them to return home. However, they discover that their voices have changed, and after Officer Bentley questions them about Peter and Judy's "disappearance", they escape to their house. They reenter Jumanji, where they have become elderly, and Alan reveals that the whirlpool is the Pool of Ages, which causes people to age and lose their young voice. The group heads for Jumanjicon to find the Golden Goblet of Jumanji, which can restore their youth, and along the way reunite with Ashton Phillips. Upon reaching Jumanjicon, Judy's walking stick helps them find the temple buried underground and she obtains the Golden Goblet, but Ashton betrays them and steals the Goblet to regain his youth which however causes him to become a talking infant. After escaping, Peter and Judy drink from the Goblet and return to their proper age. With their clue solved, they return home, where Justin, whom Judy met as an adult, no longer recognizes her and leaves. Clue(s): When silk is torn and bondage ends, you must give up what you can't defend/Youth must follow and age must lead. Two legs fail, but three succeed
40	14	"Good Bye, Jumanji"	Bob Hathcock	Tom Pugsley & Greg Klein	Dave Arnett & Curt Walstead	March 11, 1999
After entering Jumanji, Peter and Alan are chased by a lion and flee into a cave, where they find the Jumanji Crystal of Reflection, which contains records of everything that has happened in Jumanji. After touching it, they see some of their previous adventures in reverse order and realize that watching the Crystal for long enough will eventually show Alan entering Jumanji, giving them his clue and allowing him to escape. They finally get the Crystal to show Alan being transported into Jumanji, but the Crystal breaks. However, the Crystal still works and shows him receiving his clue: "An act of kindness where there is no light will help to save you from your plight." When the lion attacks them, Alan tries to fight it, but notices that it is in pain due to having a thorn in its paw. Alan removes the thorn, solving his clue and Peter and Judy's clue, allowing them to leave. Upon returning home, Peter and Judy tell Aunt Nora ask if he can stay for dinner, which she agrees to. With Alan free, Peter closes Jumanji for the last time and he and Judy decide to destroy the game. Clue(s): When you reflect on actions past, the quest you're on will end at last
