= Jumanji (TV series) =

American television series

- Also known as: Jumanji: The Animated Series
- Genre: Action/Adventure; Dark fantasy
- Created by: Everett Peck
- Based on: Jumanji by Chris Van Allsburg
- Developed by: Jeff Kline
- Voices of: Bill Fagerbakke; Debi Derryberry; Ashley Johnson; Pamela Adlon; Jeannie Elias; Melanie Chartoff; Tim Curry; Sherman Howard; Richard Allen; William Sanderson; Kevin Schon
- Theme music composer: Jim Latham
- Composer: Jim Latham
- Country of origin: United States
- Original language: English
- No. of seasons: 3
- No. of episodes: 40 (list of episodes)

Production
- Executive producer: Richard Raynis
- Producers: Bob Hathcock; Kevin D. Campbell (season 1); Peter Gaffney (season 2)
- Running time: 22 minutes
- Production companies: Interscope Communications; Teitler Film; Adelaide Productions; Columbia TriStar Television

Original release
- Network: UPN (UPN Kids)
- Release: September 8, 1996 – February 23, 1998
- Network: Syndication (Bohbot Kids Network)
- Release: September 8, 1998 – March 11, 1999

Related
- Jumanji; Zathura: A Space Adventure

Jumanji, also known as Jumanji: The Animated Series, is an American animated television series based on the 1995 film, which in turn was based on the 1981 children's picture book of the same name. The series ran for three seasons from September 8, 1996, to March 11, 1999. In 1996, it aired on the UPN Kids block on UPN, but later seasons were syndicated under the Bohbot Kids Network block.

Jumanji was the first TV show produced by Adelaide Productions, a division of Sony Pictures Television responsible for creating animated series. Duckman creator Everett Peck did character designs for the series.

== Plot ==
Judy and Peter Shepherd are two children who find a board game called Jumanji. Each turn, they are given a "clue" and then transported into the world of the game until they solve it, which allows them to leave. During their adventures, they meet Alan Parrish, another player who became trapped in the game world because he never saw his clue and was unable to solve it to leave, and their main goal becomes freeing him from the game. Later, they free another player who calls himself the Master of Jumanji and who has been trapped for longer than Alan. Unlike Alan, he saw his clue but never solved it, despite trying to get others to solve it for him, but is able to solve it with the help of the kids.

Alan later reveals that there have been other players of the game throughout time, many of whom left their toys in the cave that is part of his home, but not all of them survived the game. In the final episode, using a crystal that shows the past, the kids and Alan find his clue by observing his roll and what the game said, and figure out why he never saw it: right after he rolled, his mom called him to dinner, and as he was leaving, the clue appeared and he was transported into the game. With the clue revealed to him, Alan realized he could have gotten out of Jumanji immediately when he got inside the game. Now that he knows his clue, Alan, with the help of Judy and Peter, solves it and escapes Jumanji. Afterwards, the kids decide to destroy the game so that no one else will suffer from it.

=== Changes ===
While the show followed the movie's plot, there were several changes, such as the exclusion of Bonnie Hunt's character Sarah Whittle. In the original film and picture book, the board game's hazards would manifest in the real world, while in the show, the game's participants are transported to a world inside the game itself, an aspect also present in the sequels.

== Characters ==
=== Main ===
- Alan Robert John James Parrish III (voiced by Bill Fagerbakke as an adult, Justin Jon Ross as a child) is Judy and Peter's companion in Jumanji, who has been trapped in the game since he was a boy and can only get out by solving his original clue. He aims to leave the game and sometimes succeeds, but always ends up back in the game until the final episode, where he solves his clue by pulling a thorn from a lion's paw. "Nothing to Fear" reveals that he considers Peter and Judy to be his family and that his worst fear is that he will die without being freed.
- Judy Shepherd (voiced by Debi Derryberry) is Peter's older sister, whose intelligence helps the group to solve problems. She is brave, compassionate, and always willing to help those in need; such as in "Air Judy", when she risks her life to save the Jumockis' eggs and village from Professor Ibsen.
- Peter Shepherd (voiced by Ashley Johnson as a child, Cam Clarke as an adult) is Judy's younger brother, who is stated in "Eye of the Sea" to be nine years old. Unlike in the film, where he is shy and soft-spoken, he is immature and often argues with his sister, but cares for her. Peter often cheats and transforms into various animals as a punishment, including a monkey and other jungle animals, such as a tortoise, a toucan, a warthog, a frog, a skunk, and a salamander. He can also speak Manji and seems to be friends with them since he saved their leader, Tribal Bob.

=== Villains ===
- Van Pelt (voiced by Sherman Howard) is a big-game hunter who hunts everything, regardless if they are man or beast, without remorse, and hates when players call Jumanji "a game". In the episode "Law of Jumanji", it is revealed that there must always be a hunter in Jumanji; when Peter disposes of Van Pelt by throwing him down a bottomless pit, he begins transforming into a clone of him before Alan and Judy bring the original Van Pelt back to life.
- J. H. "Trader" Slick (voiced by Tim Curry) is a merchant who sells items to those who meet the terms of his transactions. He lives and sells his wares at a trading post located at the heart of the jungle.
- Professor J. S. Ibsen (voiced by William Sanderson) is a robotic mad scientist who operates from a factory where he builds machines and vehicles and creates monsters such as armored rhinos, acid-tongued frogs, and berbalangs. Ibsen's name is a reference to the character J.F. Sebastian from Blade Runner and Norwegian playwright Henrik Ibsen, author of the stage play The Master Builder.
- Captain Ishmael Squint (voiced by Charles Napier) is a pirate who lost his nose during his battle against the Draken, a sea monster which is a cross between a dragon and a kraken. Squint's vengeful pursuit of the Draken is reminiscent of Captain Ahab in Moby Dick and his name is a reference to its protagonist Ishmael.
  - Mr. Schreve and Mr. Shatic (voiced by Xander Berkeley and Glenn Shadix) are shipmates of Squint who assist him in looking for treasure underwater.
- Stalker (voiced by Richard Allen) is a being similar to the Grim Reaper who is the protector of Jumanji and who other villains fear. He is implied to be the personification of the term "Game Over".
- Ashton Philips (voiced by Dabney Coleman as an adult, Jeannie Elias as a baby) is a greedy adventurer who is overconfident, arrogant, and willing to betray others to achieve his goals. In the episode "An Old Story", Philips' search for the Golden Goblet of Jumanjicon leads him to encounter Alan, Judy, and Peter in their search for it and reclaim his compass, which Trader Slick swindled him into trading. After drinking from the Goblet, Philips is reduced to a baby while maintaining his mind.
- Ludwig Von Richtor (voiced by Alan Oppenheimer) is a German hunter and Van Pelt's rival.
- The Judge (voiced by Ed Asner) is an ape-like lawkeeper who is unforgiving and condemns all without regard to innocence. The Judge is also hypocritically greedy as shown when he takes an orb from the Fludgels and is sucked into it.
  - Justice is a giant gorilla who is the Judge's minion and only weapon.
- Flint (voiced by Charlie Schlatter) is a wizard who Jumanji created to mess with Judy's mind. He turns several people into stone before Judy defeats him by reflecting his attack back at him using a mirror, freeing his victims and turning him to stone.
- The Jamazons are a tribe of huntresses and warriors ruled by Queen Gina who are similar to the Amazons of Greek mythology. Their wedding tradition includes marrying only single males while sacrificing the groom into the volcano.
  - Queen Gina (voiced by Cathy Moriarty) is the leader of the Jamazons.
- Black Ant Queen (voiced by Jennifer Darling) is the leader of the black ants.
- Red Ant Queen (voiced by Susan Silo) is the leader of the red ants.
- Sand King (voiced by Jim Cummings) is a sand monster who is the ruler of Jumanji's Sand Kingdom.
- Ms. Desmona (voiced by Bibi Osterwald) is a brash and self-centered woman. In the episode "Sorceress of Jumanji", she is transported into Jumanji after purchasing the game from Aunt Nora and obtains the Tome of Jumanji, which gives her magical powers. Desmona wreaks havoc until Judy defeats her by taking the Tome from her and forces her to solve her riddle to send her back to the real world.
- The Lion is a lion who has been chasing Alan since he first entered Jumanji. In the final episode, "Goodbye Jumanji," it is revealed that it was part of Alan's clue and had been following him because it had a thorn in its paw that was causing it pain. After Alan works up the courage to remove it, his clue is solved and he is able to leave.

=== Others ===
- Aunt Nora Shepherd (voiced by Melanie Chartoff) is Judy and Peter's aunt and legal guardian, who is transported into Jumanji several times, but they convince her is a dream.
- The Manji Tribe (variously voiced by Billy West, Maurice LaMarche, Dee Bradley Baker, Patrick Pinney, Danny Mann, and Kevin Schon) are fierce warriors who are hostile towards humans, but are tolerant of Alan, Peter and Judy, and have a primitive way of communicating, as their native language consists of squeaks, clicks, buzzes, whistles, and hand gestures.
  - Tribal Bob (voiced by Richard Allen) is the leader of the Manji.
- Officer Carl Bentley (voiced by Richard Allen) is a police officer who patrols Judy and Peter's neighborhood. When he was younger, he was a friend of Alan and worked at a shoe factory that later shut down.
- Rock (voiced by Pamela Adlon in season 1, Jeannie Elias in seasons 2 and 3) is a school bully who picks on Peter.
  - John is one of Rock's friends.
  - Jim is one of Rock's friends.
  - Rob is one of Rock's friends.
- Wade Riley (voiced by Charlie Schlatter in "Love on the Rocks", Michael Reisz in "Love Potion")
- The Master of Jumanji (voiced by Tony Jay) is a player who became trapped in Jumanji years before Alan did because he could not solve his clue, which was written on the wall in the Palace of Lost Clues. After realizing what his clue meant, he disappears to his own time in St. Claire.
- Dorothy "Dottie" McGrail (voiced by Eileen Brennan) is a flying ace who entered Jumanji through a hole in the sky.
- The "Banana Brains" are a trio of primates known for causing mischief and wreaking havoc on those who cross their path or ruin their "fun".
  - Dead-Eye (voiced by Kevin Schon) is the light-blue leader of the group who resembles a baboon with a lazy left eye.
  - Fang (voiced by Billy West) is a small brown monkey who resembles the ones from the original film.
  - Brutus (voiced by Maurice LaMarche) is a large gray monkey who resembles a gorilla but with a tail.

== Episodes ==
Season	Episodes	Originally released		
Season	Episodes	First released	Last released	Network
1	13	September 8, 1996	February 23, 1997	UPN (UPN Kids)
2	13	September 20, 1997	February 23, 1998	UPN (UPN Kids)
3	14	September 8, 1998	March 11, 1999	Syndication (Bohbot Kids Network)

== Voice Cast ==
=== Main cast ===
- Bill Fagerbakke – Alan Parrish
- Debi Derryberry – Judy Shepherd, Mud Girl (in "Mud Boy")
- Ashley Johnson – Peter Shepherd
- Pamela Adlon – Rock (seasons 1 and 2)
- Melanie Chartoff – Aunt Nora Shepherd
- Tim Curry – Trader Slick
- Jeannie Elias – Rock (seasons 2 and 3), Cindy (in "Love Potion"), Perfume Receptionist (in "Love Potion"), Sally, Bizarre Aunt Nora, Baby Ashton Philips (in "An Old Story")
- Sherman Howard – Van Pelt, Van Bentley (in "Brantford, the Game")
- Richard Allen – Officer Bentley, Tribal Bob, Stalker (in "No Dice", "The Gift"), Van Bentley (in "Brantford, the Game")
- William Sanderson – Professor Ibsen, Fake Bradford Observatory Professor (in "Brantford, the Game")
- Kevin Schon – Dead-Eye, Manji, Rock's friend

=== Additional voices ===
- Christy Alvarez – Maria
- Beverly Archer – Peter's Teacher
- Ed Asner – The Judge (in "The Trial", "The Ultimate Weapon"), Repairman
- René Auberjonois – Professor Alsip (in "Brantford, the Game", "Air Judy")
- Dee Bradley Baker – Manji, Mud Boy (in "Mud Boy")
- Jacqui Bakshy – Rock's Friend (in "The Doll")
- Bob Bergen – Science Teacher (in "Brantford, The Game")
- Xander Berkeley – Mr. Schreve (in "Return of Squint")
- Eileen Brennan – Dorothy "Dottie" McGrail (in "Air Judy")
- Christine Cavanaugh – Rock's Friend (in "Love Potion"), Unibrowed Boy (in "Love Potion"), Cashier (in "Love Potion")
- Cam Clarke – Adult Peter Shepherd (in "An Old Story"), Justin Galloway (in "An Old Story"), Car Salesman (in "An Old Story")
- Dabney Coleman – Ashton Philips (in "The Palace of Clues", "An Old Story")
- Jim Cummings – Sand King (in "The Magic Chest"), Shocker
- E. G. Daily – Disco Boy (in "Love Potion"), Spectacled Boy (in "Love Potion"), Flower Delivery Girl (in "Love Potion")
- Jennifer Darling – Black Ant Queen (in "The Red and the Black")
- Andy Dick – Mr. Olsen (in "The Magic Chest")
- Paul Eiding – Black Ant Soldier (in "The Red and the Black")
- Peter Iacangelo – Lowlife (in "The Intruder")
- Tony Jay – Master of Jumanji (in "The Master of the Game")
- Bob Joles – Coach Bartlett (in "The Doll")
- Maurice LaMarche – The Key, Manji, Brutus
- Danny Mann – Manji, Umpire (in "Who Am I?", "The Doll"), Chimpanzee (in "Who Am I?")
- Roddy McDowall – Furvish (in "Air Judy")
- Cathy Moriarty – Queen Gina (in "Perfect Match")
- Pat Musick – Giant Chicken (in "El Pollo Jumanji")
- Charles Napier – Captain Ishmael Squint (in "Eye of the Sea", "Return of Squint", "The Ultimate Weapon")
- Alan Oppenheimer – Ludwig Von Richtor (in "The Trial", "The Ultimate Weapon")
- Bibi Osterwald – Ms. Desmona (in "Sorceress of Jumanji")
- Brian Peck – Red Ant Soldier (in "The Red and the Black")
- Pat Pinney – Manji
- Michael Reisz – Wade Riley (in "Love Potion")
- Justin Jon Ross – Young Alan Parrish (in "Young Alan")
- William Schallert – Dr. Cahill (in "The Plague")
- Charlie Schlatter – Flint (in "Love on the Rocks"), Wade Riley (in "Love on the Rocks"), B-Bop A, Luna
- Glenn Shadix – Mr. Shatic (in "Return of Squint")
- Susan Silo – Red Ant Queen (in "The Red and the Black")
- Cynthia Songé – Mrs. Hinman (in "Return of Squint")
- Steven Weber – Jack (in "The Intruder")
- Billy West – Manji, Fang

== Crew ==
- Susan Blu – Dialogue Director

== Broadcast ==
In 1996, it was carried by the UPN Kids block on UPN, but later seasons were syndicated by BKN. The series was also shown by CITV in the United Kingdom, TRTÉ in the Republic of Ireland and on Russian RTR channel. It has aired in Pakistan on Cartoon Network in English and currently airs on Filmax in Urdu and on Aruj TV in Pushto.

Episodes of the show are available on iTunes , The Roku Channel, Tubi and Hulu. The show was rerun on Kabillion on Demand. The show has also been released through YouTube (via the Throwback Toons and Sci-Fi City channels).

== Home media ==
On August 28, 2012, Sony Pictures Home Entertainment released Jumanji: The Complete First Season on DVD in region 1. This was a Manufacture-on-Demand (MOD) release, available exclusively in the US and is part of the Sony Pictures Choice Collection in partnership with Warner Bros. online store. It is also available through Amazon.com and their CreateSpace MOD program.

Mill Creek Entertainment re-released season 1 on DVD in Region 1 on February 17, 2015, followed by the complete series on DVD in Region 1 in August 2017.
