= Moris Tepper =

American singer-songwriter

- Also known as: Moris Tepper, Jeff M. Tepper, Jeff Morris Tepper, Moris Tapir, Love Hunter, White Jew, Jeff Tepper
- Born: Jeff Moris Tepper
- Origin: Los Angeles
- Genres: Alternative rock, rock, blues, experimental, jazz
- Occupations: Musician, artist
- Instruments: Guitar, vocals
- Years active: 1970s–present
- Website: https://www.candlebone.com/

Moris Tepper, sometimes credited as Jeff Moris Tepper, is an American singer-songwriter, guitarist and artist.

Tepper first came to prominence in the late 1970s with Captain Beefheart. He has also worked with singers Tom Waits, PJ Harvey, Robyn Hitchcock and Frank Black. He has recorded several solo albums. His album Head Off (2004) includes a lyrical collaboration with the reclusive Beefheart with the song "Ricochet Man".

Tepper met Beefheart (alias Don Van Vliet) by chance while studying as an art student in Northern California in the mid-1970s. Van Vliet had already started to focus on painting and although they shared this in common it was when Van Vliet learned Tepper knew guitar parts to Trout Mask Replica that he became interested in putting together a new band around Tepper's unique guitar sound. This was done later in Los Angeles after Van Vliet and Frank Zappa had reunited briefly for the Bongo Fury tour. The result of the new band led to arguably some of Captain Beefheart's most creative music efforts including albums Shiny Beast (1978), Doc at the Radar Station (1980) and Ice Cream for Crow (1982). Tepper joined The Magic Band in 1976 and stayed in the band until 1982. He is one of the longest serving (without a break) Magic Band members and the only one to receive production credit for Ice Cream for Crow (1982)

Tepper's first released solo work beginning with Big Enough to Disappear (1996) and then Moth to Mouth (2000) came after having been a sideman for many years. His music has been reviewed as "accessibly avant-garde" and although it may be difficult to shed his sideman cult status he remains inspired. Stingray in the Heart (2008) was described as an album that never pauses in a familiar territory.

Tepper is also a painter and he divides his time between music and painting. Tepper has occasionally worked as a television composer since the 1990s. One of his first shows was Saban Entertainment's animated series The Mouse and the Monster, which aired on UPN Kids in 1996 and 1997. In the 2000s, he went on to compose for Army Wives, Bakersfield P.D., Rob & Big, Scrubs and The Minor Accomplishments Of Jackie Woodman.

== Discography ==
=== With Captain Beefheart and the Magic Band ===
==== Studio albums ====
- Shiny Beast (1978)
- Doc at the Radar Station (1980)
- Ice Cream for Crow (1982)
- Bat Chain Puller (2012)

==== Live albums ====
- I'm Going to Do What I Wanna Do: Live at My Father's Place 1978 (2000)
- Merseytrout: Live in Liverpool 1980 (2000)

==== Compilations ====
- A Carrot Is As Close As A Rabbit Gets To A Diamond (1993 compilation)
- Grow Fins: Rarities 1965–1982 (1999)
- The Dust Blows Forward (1999)

=== With 17 Pygmies ===
- Captured in Ice (1985)
- Welcome (1988)

=== With Gary Lucas ===
- Improve The Shining Hour (2000 compilation)

=== With Tom Waits ===
- Franks Wild Years (1987)

=== With Frank Black ===
- Teenager of the Year (1994)
- Dog in the Sand (2001)
- Black Letter Days (2002)
- Devil's Workshop (2002)

=== With Tommy Santee Klaws ===
- Forcefeeder (2018)
- Honeysuckle (2021)
- A Table Before Me (2024)

=== Solo albums ===
- Big Enough to Disappear (1996)
- Sundowner, Eggtooth (1998)
- Moth to Mouth (2000)
- Head Off (2004)
- Stingray in the Heart (2008)
- A Singer Named Shotgun Throat (2010)
- Building A Nest (2024)

=== Compilations ===
- Songs in the Key Of Z: The Curious Universe Of Outsider Music (2000)
- Now Hear This! 70 (2008)
