= Moonlight in Vermont =

Moonlight in Vermont can refer to:

- Moonlight in Vermont (film), a 1943 film
- "Moonlight in Vermont" (song), a popular song best known in a recording by Margaret Whiting with Billy Butterfield's Orchestra
- Moonlight in Vermont (album), a 1956 compilation jazz album by Johnny Smith
- Moonlight in Vermont, a 2017 television film featuring Lacey Chabert

== See also ==
- "Moonlight on Vermont", a 1969 song by Captain Beefheart
