= I'm Going to Do What I Wanna Do: Live at My Father's Place 1978 =

I'm Going to Do What I Wanna Do

Live album by Captain Beefheart and the Magic Band
- Released: September 2000
- Recorded: November 18, 1978
- Venue: My Father's Place, Roslyn, NY
- Length: 83:27
- Label: Rhino
- Producer: Roland Worthington Hand

Captain Beefheart and the Magic Band chronology
Grow Fins (1999)	I'm Going to Do What I Wanna Do (2000)	An Ashtray Heart (2011)

Professional ratings
Review scores
Source	Rating
AllMusic	4.5/5 stars
Pitchfork Media	8.5/10
PopMatters	(favourable)

I'm Going to Do What I Wanna Do is a live album from Captain Beefheart and the Magic Band. In support of the US release of his album Shiny Beast (Bat Chain Puller), Beefheart and the band undertook a promotional club tour. On Saturday, November 18, 1978, they performed at My Father's Place in Roslyn, New York. My Father's Place was located under a motorway bridge, held about 200 people and the patrons sat at long tables and could dine whilst listening if they wished. The show was recorded and mixed directly to two-track tape. The tape was used for a radio broadcast on WLIR-FM on 11 December 1978. Following a limited release on CD, Rhino Records made the tracks available for download. In April 2023, Rhino released the concert on a double vinyl LP, limited to 5000, for Record Store Day.

The show featured ten of the twelve songs from Captain Beefheart's then-current release, Shiny Beast (Bat Chain Puller), three songs from Safe as Milk (1967), four songs from Trout Mask Replica (1969), and two songs from Clear Spot (1972).

== Track listing ==
All tracks are written by Don Van Vliet, except "Owed T' Alex" and "Dropout Boogie" by Don Van Vliet and Herb Bermann.

Disc One: Main Show
No.	Title	Studio version	Length
1.	"Tropical Hot Dog Night"	Shiny Beast (Bat Chain Puller) (1978)	4:36
2.	"Nowadays a Woman's Gotta Hit a Man"	Clear Spot (1972)	5:07
3.	"Owed T' Alex"	Shiny Beast (Bat Chain Puller)	5:20
4.	"Dropout Boogie"	Safe as Milk (1967)	3:13
5.	"Harry Irene"	Shiny Beast (Bat Chain Puller)	3:46
6.	"Abba Zaba"	Safe as Milk	3:44
7.	"Her Eyes Are a Blue Million Miles"	Clear Spot	4:12
8.	"Old Fart at Play"	Trout Mask Replica (1969)	2:26
9.	"Well"	Trout Mask Replica	3:56
10.	"Ice Rose"	Shiny Beast (Bat Chain Puller)	3:56
11.	"Moonlight on Vermont"	Trout Mask Replica	3:52
12.	"The Floppy Boot Stomp"	Shiny Beast (Bat Chain Puller)	4:18
13.	"You Know You're a Man"	Shiny Beast (Bat Chain Puller)	3:26
14.	"Bat Chain Puller"	Shiny Beast (Bat Chain Puller)	5:55
15.	"Apes-Ma"	Shiny Beast (Bat Chain Puller)	0:46
16.	"When I See Mommy I Feel Like a Mummy"	Shiny Beast (Bat Chain Puller)	6:04
17.	"Veteran's Day Poppy"	Trout Mask Replica	9:11

Disc Two: Encores
No.	Title	Studio version	Length
1.	"Safe as Milk"	Safe as Milk	5:19
2.	"Suction Prints"	Shiny Beast (Bat Chain Puller)	4:41

== Personnel ==
Musicians

- Captain Beefheart (Don Van Vliet) – vocals, tenor saxophone, soprano saxophone, harmonica, whistling
- Jeff Moris Tepper – guitar, slide guitar
- Richard Redus – guitar, slide guitar, slide bass, accordion
- Bruce Fowler – trombone and air bass
- Eric Drew Feldman – bass guitar, synthesizer, keyboards
- Robert Williams – drums, percussion

with

- Mary Jane Eisenberg – shake bouquet

Technical

- Jeff Kracke – recording engineer
- Michael Billeter – recording technician
- Peter Hedeman – recording technician
- Michael Tapes – event executive producer
- Bob Fisher – mastering
