= The Mouse and the Monster =

American animated television series

- Genre: Animation; Comedy
- Developed by: Jerry Leibowitz
- Written by: Glenn Eichler; Peggy Nicoll; Jerry Leibowitz; Ralph Soll; Ron Hauge
- Directed by: Kent Butterworth
- Voices of: Herbert Ikatap; Buddy Johnson; Marion Kaplan; Lucille Scrubber; Wes Turner
- Theme music composer: Shuki Levy; Morris Tepper
- Composers: Shuki Levy; Kussa Mahchi; Moris Tepper
- Country of origin: United States
- No. of seasons: 1
- No. of episodes: 13 (25 segments)

Production
- Executive producers: Jerry Leibowitz; Elizabeth Daro; Eric Rollman
- Producers: Larry Houston; Will Meugniot
- Running time: 22 minutes
- Production companies: Saban Entertainment; Sunwoo Entertainment; Saerom Animation

Original release
- Network: UPN
- Release: September 21, 1996 – March 8, 1997

The Mouse and the Monster is a 1996–97 American animated series created by Jerry Leibowitz for Saban Entertainment. It centered around a mouse named Chesbro, and a beatnik monster named Mo. The show was originally part of the UPN network's 1996 UPN Kids lineup alongside other Saban-related shows, such as Bureau of Alien Detectors and The Incredible Hulk. Reruns later appeared on the Fox Family Channel.

== Plot ==
During what would be his final concert, the brilliant pianist, Flatnoteski, suffers a heart attack and dies. Among the front-row visitors are Dr. Wackerstein and his wife and assistant, Olga. Dr. Wackerstein immediately claims Flatnoteski's brain so that the Doctor can create a body to place said brain in and allow Flatnoteski's genius to live on.

For this brain transplant, Dr. Wackerstein creates Mo, a cycloptic golem bearing a passing resemblance to Frankenstein's Monster. However, even without a brain, Mo has a mind and personality of his own and does not want his own newly-created life to make room for a brain that isn't his. An inhabitant of Wackerstein's castle, a mouse named Chesbro, befriends Mo and helps him to flee. Pals together, they are on the run from the mad scientist.

== Characters ==
- Chesbro "Chez" Mouse: An ordinary yellow former lab-mouse. He is Mo's best friend and travel companion, both on the run from Dr. Wackerstein. He has a pessimistic streak, often feeling regretful for leaving a cheese factory over a laboratory job. Chez is constantly busy keeping Mo (and himself) out of trouble.
- Mo: A large blue cycloptic beatnik monster. He's cheerful, impulsive, and generally kind. Having been brought into creation rather than being born, Mo possesses a childlike fascination for things he isn't familiar with. He loves drumming on his bongos in a true beatnik fashion. His favorite food is gumballs, especially squid-flavored ones. He truly reviles liverwurst, from having been force-fed the stuff while a captive of the doctor, and can go on a berserk rampage if he even so much as hears the word.
- Dr. Wackerstein: A short purple man, who is a lunatic scientist with decent intentions, but insane means. He creates Mo so he can place Flatnoteski's Brain inside of his skull and, when he finds out Mo has escaped, he chases after him. Wackerstein also has an assistant named Olga, whom he always calls Igor, much to her chagrin and in spite of her repeated corrections.
- Olga: A woman with a green complexion, a Slavic accent and a tall pink beehive hairstyle. She is Dr. Wackerstein's wife and assistant. Besides being a performance artist, Olga is a strange, completely inexciteable woman. She often keeps Dr. Wackerstein in line, acting as a voice of reason for his boisterous behavior. What few pleasures in life she has includes her mother's schnitzels and interpretive dance paired with her own experimental form of music, which generally consists of a tuba playing short notes, accompanied by off-key opera singing. Her catchphrase is: "My name is Olga, you vertically challenged bupkis of a man!"
- Flatnoteski's Brain: The brilliant composer and pianist, Flatnoteski, has died from a heart attack, but his disembodied brain lives on. It's usually brought along with Dr. Wackerstein, riding in the toddler's seat in the back of the doctor's car. Despite being a disembodied brain, it will often express its feelings to the viewer, in the form of a thought balloon that conveys a brainwave frequency line, which changes to reflect what it's thinking, such as short words like "HELP".

== Production ==
Rights to the show were jointly held between Saban Entertainment (which had recently merged with Fox Kids to form Fox Kids Worldwide) and UPN (which was then owned by Paramount Television and Chris-Craft Industries). This was also the case with Bureau of Alien Detectors, another Saban cartoon produced in conjunction with UPN (now Skydance). Half of the show's ownership passed to Disney in 2001, when Disney acquired Fox Kids Worldwide.

The show's crew included writers from outside of Saban, such as Ron Hauge (who was also writing for The Simpsons and The Ren & Stimpy Show) and Glenn Eichler (who worked as a story editor on Beavis and Butt-Head, and went on to co-create a 1997 spin-off titled Daria). The background music has been described as having a diverse sound, and incorporates several styles, such as jazz and guitar music. Creator Jerry Liebowitz said he wanted the music to have a "stylistic edge" like the show itself. Shuki Levy and Haim Saban, under his alias Kussa Mahchi, are listed as the composers in the credits. The soundtrack featured work from guitarist Moris Tepper (only credited as a music producer), who is known for his collaborations with progressive rock artist Captain Beefheart. This ended up being the only Saban Entertainment show that Tepper ever worked on.

== Episodes ==
No.	Title	Written by	Original release date
1	"Ches Meets Mo"	Mel Sherer	September 21, 1996
The heart-burning origin of how Ches and Mo meet, develop a friendship and flee the insane clutches of mad Doctor Wackerstein, the brain of Doc's late favorite pianist, Flatnoteski, and Doc's avant-garde wife, Olga.
2	"A Mouse, a Monster & a Baby"	Henry Gilroy	September 28, 1996
Ches and Mo become surrogate parents as well as living play-toys for an irritable 600-pound Baby Pookers left on their doorstep. After eating the carpets and soiling enough diapers to top off a landfill, it becomes clear what the gigantic infant's real purpose is for dropping in on our duo.
3	"The Mouse, the Monster & the Mouse-Monster"	Glenn Eichler	October 5, 1996
Ches and Mo take over burnt-out Sappy the Clown's kid's party entertainment business with disastrous results. In hot pursuit, Doc and Olga crash the party.
4	"Coffee, Tea or Mo?"	Peter Elwell	October 12, 1996
In an effort to save a few bucks, Ches elects to bring Mo's head aboard an airplane as carry-on luggage. A demented Doctor Wackerstein barely pilots the air-bus while stewardess Olga preps the passengers on how to save their worthless lives in case of emergency.
5	"The Mouse and the Monastery"	Glenn Eichler	October 19, 1996
A wrong turn from a tour bus leaves our boys stranded at a strange monastery, where there's more monkey business than a barrel of — well, you get the idea.
6	"Missing Mo"	Peggy Nicoll	October 26, 1996
It's a hot pursuit in the frozen tundra as Doc and Olga chase Ches and Mo to the Antarctic where a batty anthropologist takes a particular interest in Mo. Mush!
7	"Bottles Away"	Mark Drop	November 2, 1996
Ches and Mo take the sewer route to a high-seas adventure that finds them hired as pirates by an old familiar friend, while Doc, Olga and The Brain give chase aboard a luxury cruise ship. Anchors aweigh!
8	"Old Friends"	Ralph Soll	November 9, 1996
Ches naps in the park and dreams about himself, Mo, Doc and Olga under the same roof in an old-folks' home. Strained gumballs, anyone?
9	"Heartless Mo"	Peter Elwell	November 16, 1996
Tired of constant heartburn from a horrid diet, Mo's heart pops a few stitches in the monster's chest, hops out and decides to see the world, leaving behind a heartless, one-eyed goofball suddenly with no scruples.
10	"Bad Plumbing"	Ralph Soll	November 23, 1996
Beware ye… goes nowhere near the haunted house with possessed plumbing! Do you think our two idiots heed the warning? Yeah, right.
11	"Of Mice and Mo"	Peter Elwell	November 30, 1996
Ches and Mo are good ol' country hitchhikers as the monster is recruited by town-folk to scare-crow away them ding-dangity parakeets that keep ruinin' the town's prize-winning melons. Good choice — have a melon-head guard your melons.
12	"H.M.O. Mo"	Henry Gilroy	December 7, 1996
Mo's under the weather, which yields a trip to the pediatrician. But Ches is the one inadvertently ushered into the examining room and diagnosed as a rare rat-boy, while Mo's detachable body parts entertain kids in the waiting room.
13	"All Systems Mo"	Glenn Eichler	December 14, 1996
Ches and Mo are abducted, er, recruited as astronauts for Slobovia's backwards space program as Doc and Olga, hot on our boys' trail, also get a taste of 4th-world hospitality.
14	"Camp Mo"	Peter Elwell	December 21, 1996
Hey kids, for good wholesome summer fun, come to Camp Mo, where counselors Ches, Mo, Doc and Olga misguide kiddies through horribly unsafe fun and activities.
15	"I Married a Monster"	Ron Hauge	December 28, 1996
On the road again, Mo is forced into drag as he and Ches check into the Honeymoon Hotel and encounter a couple psychotic characters that almost make Doc and Olga seem normal. I now pronounce you Mouse and Monster. You may kiss the bride. Feh!
16	"Sleep Tight"	Henry Gilroy	January 4, 1997
Mo's sonic snoring tops a litany of annoyances that prevent Ches from getting a good night's sleep. And when Mo's body goes sleepwalking, an exhausted Ches tows Mo's head along in middle of the night on a city-wide search for the monster's torso.
17	"Who Do That Voodoo Like Mo Do?"	Jerry Leibowitz	January 11, 1997
In this epic tale, Doc Wackerstein's Mo Voodoo doll ends up in the clutches of a toy conglomerate and ultimately into the hands of millions of pin-plunging kids worldwide. Oooch! Ouch! Eech! Yowch!
18	"Nutballs and Meatballs"	Patrick Corcoran	January 18, 1997
Man, what these scammers won't do for a free meal! Stowaways Ches and Mo travel to Sweden for a meatball eating contest and wouldn't ya know it, run into good ol' Doc Wackerstein, who's in town for a mad scientist's convention.
19	"A Tale from the Thinwall"	Peter Elwell	January 25, 1997
There are many odd tales from our duo's crumbling, vermin-infested Thinwall Hotel, and this is just one of the. Episode "lowlights" include a visit from the Eye Gunk Fairy.
20	"Masked Masher"	Winston Richard	February 1, 1997
Ches turns wrestling promoter and hypes his oversized monster pal as the Masked Masher, a fierce grappler from "parts unknown." Unfortunately, The Mashers career-ending opponent is none other than crowd favorite, Baby Pookers, the 600-pound cranky infant badly in need of a nap. Doc, Olga and The Brain join the bone-crunching fun.
21	"Fashion Victims"	Patrick Corcoran	February 8, 1997
Mo has an identity crisis when a fickle but famous fashion designer rips off his raggedy, tattered clothing style and makes the monster-look all the rage.
22	"Blue Birthday"	Ralph Soll	February 15, 1997
Ches sneaks off to take an ill-fated job at a pet shop to earn enough money to buy Mo a birthday present. But Ches is mistaken for merchandise, becomes a pet rat for Olga's cat, then a hostage in Doc's efforts to lure Mo to save his pal.
23	"Green Banana Moon"	Jerry Leibowitz, Ralph Soll & Jim Williams	February 22, 1997
Our cast and their nightmares are featured in this poetic pause. "Searching with its moonbeam, its glow will find you soon, and once it does you're sure to dream beneath the Green Banana Moon."
24	"Monsters and Mazes"	Steven Melching & Sammy Bear	March 1, 1997
Ches and Mo are mistaken for distinguished scientists, but ultimately find themselves the subjects of bizarre behavioral studies. Doc shows up just in time to make matters worse.
25	"Oh, My Name Is Olga"	Mark Drop	March 8, 1997
In this all-Doc-and-Olga episode, Olga finally snaps when Wackerstein calls her "Igor" for the one-millionth time, sending her packing back home to mama. Doc hires a psychotic temp that gives Wackerstein a taste of his own medicine.
