= Bureau of Alien Detectors =

- Genre: Science fiction Horror; Action; Adventure; Humor
- Developed by: Eric Lewald; Julia Lewald
- Directed by: Ron Myrick
- Starring: Michael McConnohie; Bree Anderson; Peter Spellos; Reuben Daniels; Sammy Lane; Walter Rego; Tyrone Week
- Composers: Shuki Levy; Kussa Mahchi; Larry Seymour
- Country of origin: United States
- No. of seasons: 1
- No. of episodes: 13

Production
- Executive producers: Joel Andryc; Eric S. Rollman
- Producer: Ron Myrick
- Running time: 30 minutes
- Production company: Saban Entertainment

Original release
- Network: UPN
- Release: September 8 – December 1, 1996

Bureau of Alien Detectors (commonly initialized as BAD) is an American animated series by Saban Entertainment that aired on the UPN network's weekend-morning cartoon block UPN Kids. It was touted as "X-Files meets the A-Team," and only lasted for one season from September 8 to December 1, 1996.

== Plot ==
The series follows the exploits of the Phalanx Squad of the titular organization, led by war veteran Ben Packer, and consisting of resident psychic Casey Taylor, biologist Shane Sanderson, computer expert Colin Marcus, and super powered alien encounter survivor Moose Trengannu. But as they protect humanity from threats beyond the stars, some of the higher ups in B.A.D. have their own plans for the aliens.

== Cast ==
- Michael McConnohie as Ben Packer
- Bree Anderson as Casey Taylor
- Peter Spellos as Moose Trengganu
- Tyrone Week as Colin Marcus
- Reuben Daniels as Shane Sanderson
- Sammy Lane as Eterno
- Walter Rego as Major V

== Characters ==
Main

- Ben Packer (voiced by Michael McConnohie) - A war hero Marine Sergeant and leader of the Phalanx squad.
- Casey Taylor (voiced by Bree Anderson) - The psychic second-in-command of the Phalanx squad.
- Colin Marcus (voiced by Tyrone Week) - An expert in covert intelligence.
- Shane Sanderson (voiced by Reuben Daniels) - A gifted medic and biologist.
- Moose Trengannu (voiced by Peter Spellos) - A former Army private that gained enchanted strength and morphing capabilities from an alien encounter.
- Eterno (voiced by Sammy Lane) - Eterno was once a warrior King whose thirst for power could not be quenched. So he sought The Methuselah Tree, the tree that makes all the water on earth, he failed, instead being entombed in salt by the tree's protectors, who caused an earthquake. As time passed, he became pure salt; Here he can only be woken when he's touched by water. After his reawakening. he started to turn the oceans into salt. Touching anything with his right hand will turn objects into salt or entomb them in a layer of salt; his left hand appears to have no effect. Only the Methuselah Tree's sap is immune to his touch.
- Major V (voiced by Walter Rego) - An adversarial military figure and the series secondary antagonist who frequently operates in opposition of the Phalanx Squad.

== Production and broadcast history ==
Rights to the show were jointly held between Saban Entertainment (which had recently merged with Fox Kids to form Fox Kids Worldwide) and UPN (which was then owned by Paramount Television and Chris-Craft Industries). This was also the case with The Mouse and the Monster, another Saban cartoon produced in conjunction with UPN. Half of the show's ownership passed to Disney in 2001, when Disney acquired Fox Kids Worldwide.

Bureau of Alien Detectors premiered on UPN during the fall of 1996 in the US, airing regularly on the network through to August 1997. Repeats later aired on Fox Family Channel in 1999 and as part of Jetix on Toon Disney in 2006. In Australia, the series was first shown on Network Ten's Cheez TV block beginning in May 1998. It aired again on Cheez TV in July 1999 and November 2000. In the UK, it aired during 2004 as part of the international Fox Kids channel.

== Episodes ==
No.	Title	Written by	Original release date
1	"The Hunt"	Francis Moss; Ted Pedersen	September 8, 1996
The team must defend an extraterrestrial ambassador nicknamed "Crystal Eve" from alien terrorists who are opposed to the sharing of knowledge and technology between species.
2	"Hothouse"	Cary Bates	September 15, 1996
A renegade scientist's attempt at solving world hunger using spores "gifted" to Earth by aliens goes awry, and results in a Costa Rican jungle being overrun by otherworldly flora.
3	"The Encounter"	Eric & Julia Lewald	September 22, 1996
B.A.D. investigates a spaceship crash near a small South Dakota town, the residents of which are acting secretive and strange.
4	"Freezer Burn"	Bruce Reid Schaefer	September 29, 1996
When a hazmat team disappears in the frigid Canadian wilderness while looking into a spaceship sighting, B.A.D. is dispatched to locate them. Along the way, they find clues to the disappearance of a fellow agent named Miguel.
5	"The Awakening"	Chuck Wagner	October 6, 1996
Long-gestating subterranean monstrosities hatch and begin terrorizing rural Kansas.
6	"The Curse of Tassim"	Francis Moss; Ted Pedersen	October 13, 1996
Two separate archaeological digs, one in Egypt and the other in Arizona, unleash a pair of ancient, malevolent energy beings known as "The Fiends of Tassim."
7	"Always Faithful"	Russell Wiederspahn	October 20, 1996
Sanderson is left in charge when Packer vanishes while investigating a spike in possible paranormal phenomena in the Bermuda Triangle that may involve Miguel.
8	"Twinkle, Twinkle Part 1"	Steve Melching; David McDermott	October 27, 1996
Earth's communications array is thrown into disarray and its military cemeteries pillaged by the Martians, a marauding race that uses cyborg zombies to conquer planets, destroying any that refuse to submit to their rule.
9	"Twinkle, Twinkle Part 2"	Brooks Wachtel	November 3, 1996
As the Earth is overrun by the undead, it is up to Casey and Moose to take out the Martian mother ship under the guidance of the benevolent alien Peytar.
10	"Gifted"	Mark Edens	November 10, 1996
A California town finds itself at the mercy of a troubled, genetically-enhanced child.
11	"Grease Trap"	Barry Hawkins	November 17, 1996
A radioactive meteorite lands in a Louisiana swamp, and mutates the resident larvae into creatures that grow and multiply rapidly by ingesting oil.
12	"And Then Comes the Rain"	Diane Fresco	November 24, 1996
A freak heatwave in North Dakota precedes a torrential downpour that prematurely ages and mutates anyone exposed to the rainwater, which originates from a giant, cloud-like alien.
13	"Bone Deep"	Don Glut	December 1, 1996
Alien radiation originating from beneath the Nevada desert has produced a race of sentient, animate dinosaur fossils.

== Reception ==
A 1997 report on violence in television by UCLA identified Bureau of Alien Detectors as one of the most violent children's programs to debut during the 1996-97 television season. It states "The show’s protagonists are a humorless lot who are principally characterized by their brooding natures and desire to 'kick alien butt.' This is consistent with the menacing and intense tone that permeates the program. Consisting principally of heavy amounts of laser gunfire and alien attacks, scenes of violence are almost non-stop throughout the show and occasionally result in characters being killed. This latter point is especially surprising since characters are virtually never killed in children’s cartoons."

In its entry for B.A.D. (Bureau of Alien Detectors; 1996-1997), the 2018 book The Encyclopedia of American Animated Television Shows states "Despite being promoted as both educational and entertaining, it was neither, borrowing too many tropes and concepts from live-action predecessors to be enjoyable on its own. Clearly, it was a series designed to fill its time slot—and do nothing else."
