= Coconut pearl =

Alleged gemstone

The coconut pearl is alleged to be a coconut-produced gemstone. Claimed to be the rarest botanical gem in the world, the coconut pearl supposedly grows inside the coconut. However, the existence of these pearls is in dispute, and some claim that published photos are hoaxes.

Wayne's Word, the source of much of the descriptive text and photographs used to illustrate coconut pearls on the Internet, writes that "several botany textbooks flatly state that coconut pearls are a hoax because proof of their existence is totally unfounded" and "I prematurely published an on-line note about this "pearl" [The Maharaja coconut pearl, on display at the Fairchild Tropical Botanic Garden in Coral Gables, Florida] in 1996 before I discovered that it did not come from a coconut." They form in roughly one in every million coconuts according to the Ripley's believe it or not daily calendar.

In Filipino culture, coconut pearls are used to protect against the Berbalang, a ghoul who eats human flesh,

The cocoa-nut pearl, a stone like an opal sometimes found in the cocoa-nut, is the only really efficacious charm against their attacks; and it is only of value to the finder, as its magic powers cease when it is given away. When the finder dies the pearl loses its luster and becomes dead.

In fiction, a coconut pearl is used as a plot point in the acclaimed children's adventure book, Nim's Island (1999) by Wendy Orr.
