= My Father's Place =

Former Long Island, New York music venue

Coordinates: 40.8038°N 73.6467°W

- Interactive map of My Father's Place
- Address: 19 Bryant Avenue; Roslyn, New York 11576; United States
- Location: Long Island
- Owner: Jay Linehan and Michael "Eppy" Epstein
- Capacity: ≈400

Construction
- Opened: May 30, 1971
- Closed: May 3, 1987

Website
- www.myfathersplace.com

My Father's Place was a music venue in Roslyn, New York. It first opened in 1971, and according to The New York Times, "created a scene that would influence music for decades to come."

In the nearly sixteen years the club was open before it closed in 1987, My Father's Place presented more than 6,000 shows from over 3,000 diverse artists. Its promoter Michael "Eppy" Epstein refused to book cover bands, and so the club became known as a place aspiring artists could perform. Young unknown musicians such as Black Flag, Billy Joel, Bruce Springsteen, Madonna, Aerosmith, The Police, Tom Petty, as well as hopeful comics Billy Crystal, Eddie Murphy, and Andy Kaufman, and a host of others graced the stage. In the summer of 2018 Epstein opened a new version of the club in a location not far from the original venue, in the newly renovated Roslyn Hotel (formerly the Roslyn Claremont Hotel).

== History ==
The venue was located on 19 Bryant Avenue in Roslyn and was formerly a car dealership, funeral parlor, bakery and bowling alley named Roslyn Bowl. In the wake of the AMF Bowling boom of the early 1960s, Roslyn Bowl was nearly out of business. To compete, the Roslyn Bowl's owner, Jay Linehan, began booking country music acts to turn the bowling alley into a music venue and promoted the new venture as the largest dance floor on Long Island. At the suggestion of Linehan's son, the Roslyn Bowl changed its name to My Father's Place. That same year, Eppy Epstein (born November 11, 1947) and Richie Hersh (born August 19, 1948) had opened a head shop in Roslyn, Never When, but was not allowed by the village to convert it into a coffee shop. Epstein and Hersh turned to Linehan and offered to book My Father's Place with rock acts. Richie Havens opened the first show at My Father's Place on May 31, 1971, to a sold out audience.

Epstein turned to radio to promote the club and by 1972 had forged a ground-breaking deal with local FM radio station WLIR to broadcast concerts from the club. Many of these broadcasts have subsequently become highly sought-after bootleg recordings. WLIR, in turn, would become one of the most influential radio stations in the country under its revolutionary program director, Denis McNamara, by creating the format "alternative radio".

Unlike most other clubs that highlighted one genre or one particular era of music, the variety of My Father's Place was possibly its most important trait. The club debuted in America most of reggae's biggest stars, helping to make the genre mainstream. Along with CBGB and Max's Kansas City, My Father's Place was a nurturing ground for young punk and new wave acts like The Runaways, The Ramones, Blondie, The Police, and Talking Heads. Country, bluegrass, and blues artists like Charlie Daniels, Linda Ronstadt, and Stevie Ray Vaughan performed early in their careers, while artists like James Brown, B.B. King, Johnny Winter and Bo Diddley played in the twilight of theirs.

Development pressures led to the village of Roslyn closing down the club on May 3, 1987, with a final performance by the band Tower of Power. WLIR would close later the same year. In 2010 a photo book documenting the history of the club, Fun and Dangerous, was published. In November 2017, Epstein reached an agreement with the 935 Lakshmi Corporation, the new owners of the Roslyn Hotel (formerly the Roslyn Claremont Hotel), to open a new club in their ballroom.

== Other locations ==
There were other venues with the same name:

- 47-29 Bell Boulevard, Bayside, New York
- 1221 Old Northern Boulevard, Roslyn, New York

== Notable performances ==
1971

- May 30, Richie Havens (venue premiere performance)

1972

- February 8, Blue Öyster Cult
- May 9–10, Todd Rundgren
- June 9–11, Sonny Terry & Brownie McGhee
- August 1, Flash
- August 6, Glass Harp

1973

- April 20, Steeleye Span
- May 22–24, Manfred Mann's Earth Band
- June 14–17, Freddie King
- July 31, Bruce Springsteen & The E-Street Band

1974

- January 30 & 31, February 1, Iggy and The Stooges
- March 3, If
- March 5–6, 10cc
- March 9, Rory Gallagher
- March 19, Soft Machine
- April 14, New York Dolls
- April 19, Roger McGuinn
- May 16, Fairport Convention featuring Sandy Denny
- July 2, Aerosmith
- July 21, Linda Ronstadt
- August 2 & 20, The Good Rats
- September 3, Rory Gallagher
- October 28 & 29, Rush

1975

- February 2, Steve Goodman
- March 26, Ray Manzarek
- September 10, Savoy Brown
- October 12, Manfred Mann's Earth Band
- November 18, Kingfish

1976

- January 31, Quicksilver Messenger Service
- February 13, Leon Redbone
- February 23, Pure Prairie League
- March 22, Ramones
- May 22, Tommy Bolin
- June 28, Toots & the Maytals
- August 8, Spirit
- August 13 & 14, The Flying Burrito Brothers
- August 31, Richie Furay
- September 9, Vassar Clements
- September 14, Emmylou Harris and the Hot Band
- September 27, Ramones & Talking Heads
- October 3, John Mayall
- November 25, Budgie
- November 27 & 28, The Flying Burrito Brothers

1977

- January 12 & 13, John Cale
- April 13, Ramones
- April 23, Tom Petty and the Heartbreakers
- June 10, Brand X & John Martyn
- July 3, Patti Smith Group
- July 15, Peter Rowan
- October 10, Tom Waits
- November 29, Meat Loaf
- December 30, Peter Rowan, Tex Logan, and Vassar Clements

1978

- January 5, Stanley Turrentine
- February 25, Eddie Money
- February 26, NRBQ
- March 7, Good Rats
- March 10, Robert Hunter
- March 16, Hawkwind
- March 20, Television
- April 7–8, Stuff
- April 10, the Barlow Sample Band, Baby!
- April 12, Pat Travers
- April 13–14, McCoy Tyner
- April 18, Richie Furay
- April 20, Roy Ayers
- May 6, Roy Buchanan
- May 10, Talking Heads
- May 27 & 28, Robert Hunter and Comfort
- June 1, Blondie & Greg Kihn Band
- June 9, Television
- June 10, Papa John Creach
- June 11, Eric Andersen
- July 13, John Prine
- July 27, John McLaughlin
- September 8, Johnny Winter
- September 15, David Johansen
- September 26, Larry Carlton
- October 13 & 14, Robert Hunter
- October 26, Carl Perkins
- October 31, Blondie
- November 4, Rockpile
- November 10, George Thorogood & the Destroyers
- November 14, Rory Gallagher Band
- November 17 & 18, Captain Beefheart & the Magic Band - released as I'm Going to Do What I Wanna Do: Live at My Father's Place 1978
- November 30, Crawler

1979

- February 13, The Fabulous Poodles
- February 24, Johnny Winter
- March 18, Muddy Waters
- March 21, Michael Franks
- March 29, The Police
- April 6, Ramones
- May 18, Nektar
- June 10, Lou Reed
- July 4, Good Rats
- July 11, Brewer & Shipley
- July 12, Bill Bruford
- July 15 & 16, Flo & Eddie
- August 9, Robert Hunter
- August 22, The Plasmatics
- August 23, John Mellencamp
- September 2, Buzzcocks
- September 7 & 8, Rory Gallagher Band
- September 13, Greg Kihn Band
- September 14, Doug Sahm
- September 15, David Johansen
- September 16, NRBQ
- September 17 Gary Burton Quintet, Yusef Lateef
- September 20, the Barlow Sample Band, Baby!
- September 24, Paul Winter Consort
- September 29, Pat Metheny
- October 1, Buddy Rich
- October 2, The Police
- November 4, Iggy Pop
- November 23, The Elvin Bishop Group
- November 29, National Health
- December 13 & 14, Hall & Oates
- December 19, 38 Special

1980

- January 14, XTC
- February 16, John Kay & Steppenwolf
- February 17, The Romantics
- March 4, Iggy Pop
- March 29, Joe Perry Project
- April 1, The Fools - released as a radio-station only EP on EMI America as The First Annual Official Unofficial April Fool's Day Live Bootleg
- April 2, Squeeze
- April 10, Johnny Winter
- May 1, The Jeff Lorber Fusion
- May 7, Grinderswitch
- May 13, Bruce Cockburn
- June 24, Small Talk Band a.k.a The Jim Small Band
- July 19, Robert Fripp & The League of Gentlemen
- August 2, Carolyne Mas
- August 19, David Bromberg
- November 22, Siouxsie and the Banshees
- December 2, XTC
- December 3, Captain Beefheart & His Magic Band
- December 31, The Good Rats

1981

- January 2, Joan Jett and the Blackhearts
- February 23, New Riders of the Purple Sage
- March 5, Teardrop Explodes
- April 11, Carl Wilson
- May 8, Dave Mason
- May 15, Joe Ely
- May 19, David Crosby
- June 3, Dixie Dregs
- July 4, The Psychedelic Furs
- July 26, Bill Nelson
- August 7, John Cale
- August 25, Missing Persons
- September 15, Riot
- October 3, Jan and Dean
- November 28, The Alvin Lee Band
- December 27, The Jim Carroll Band

1982

- January 23, B.B. King
- February 13, The Waitresses
- April 7, The Jim Small Band
- April 8, Mike Oldfield
- April 10, Anthrax
- May 17, Krokus
- May 22, Chubby Checker
- May 30, Pete Shelley
- May 31, Minor Threat / Black Flag
- July 1, Riot
- July 20, Ramones
- September 16, The Lords of the New Church
- October 24, The Psychedelic Furs
- October 31, Robby Krieger
- November 30, The Fixx

1983

- January 9, Blue Öyster Cult
- January 29, Black Flag
- March 18, Steve Vai
- May 22, "Weird Al" Yankovic
- June 6, Dixie Dregs
- June 8, Buddy Rich
- September 2, Allan Holdsworth
- September 28, The Alarm
- October 31, The Jim Small Band

1984

- January 6, Jorma Kaukonen
- January 14, The Ramones
- February 17, Wire Train
- April 22, Stevie Ray Vaughan
- July 21, Jorma Kaukonen
- December 29, The Band

1985

- Jorma Kaukonen with band There Goes the Neighborhood

1986

- October 31, Ramones
- November 1, Hot Tuna
- November 7, Robin Trower
- November 8, NRBQ
- November 21, The Band
- November 26, Billy Bragg
- November 29, Robert Gordon
- December 12, Commander Cody
- December 13, Bo Diddley

1987

- January 11, Roy Buchanan
- February 14, Hot Tuna
- May 3, Tower of Power (venue final performance)

== See also ==
- Nightclub
- The Bottom Line
