= An Ashtray Heart =

Live album by Captain Beefheart
- Released: 2011
- Recorded: 1981
- Length: 75:29
- Label: Leftfield Media

Captain Beefheart chronology
| I'm Going to Do What I Wanna Do: Live at My Father's Place 1978 (2000) | An Ashtray Heart (2011) | Bat Chain Puller (2012) |

An Ashtray Heart is a bootleg album by Captain Beefheart and his Magic Band. Recorded live in Toronto in 1981, it was released in 2011 after Beefheart's death in late 2010. It was given a rating of four stars by Record Collector.

== Track listing ==
1. "Nowadays a Woman's Gotta Hit a Man"
2. "Abba Zaba"
3. "Hot Head"
4. "Ashtray Heart"
5. "Dirty Blue Gene"
6. "Best Batch Yet"
7. "A Carrot Is As Close As A Rabbit Gets To A Diamond"
8. "Doctor Dark"
9. "Bat Chain Puller"
10. "Sheriff Of Hong Kong"
11. "Kandy Korn"
12. "Big Eyed Beans From Venus"

=== Bonus tracks ===
1. "When Big Joan Steps Up"
2. "Woe-Is-Uh-Me-Bop"
3. "Bellerin' Plain"
4. "Orange Claw Hammer" (radio broadcast with Frank Zappa, 1975)
5. "Hot Head" (Saturday Night Live)
6. "Ashtray Heart" (Saturday Night Live)
