= The Legendary A&M Sessions =

EP by Captain Beefheart and his Magic Band
- Released: October 1984
- Recorded: early 1966
- Genre: Blues rock
- Length: 11:46
- Label: A&M
- Producer: David Gates

Captain Beefheart and his Magic Band chronology
Ice Cream for Crow (1982)	The Legendary A&M Sessions (1984)	Grow Fins (1999)

Professional ratings
Review scores
Source	Rating
AllMusic	3/5 stars

The Legendary A&M Sessions is an extended play featuring five songs by Captain Beefheart & His Magic Band, recorded early in their career for their original record label A&M Records. The EP was released by the company in 1984 after Captain Beefheart had retired from music to focus on his painting career.

== Production ==
The EP is compiled from two singles originally released through A&M in 1966. The first of these paired the Bo Diddley cover "Diddy Wah Diddy" with a track written by Don Van Vliet (Beefheart) called "Who Do You Think You're Fooling?"

The second, "Moonchild", was written by producer David Gates (later of the band Bread), and was backed with Van Vliet's "Frying Pan".

The fifth song, "Here I Am I Always Am", was a rejected B-side which was initially planned as the B Side of "Moonchild" (and appears as such on a test pressing) but was passed over in favor of "Frying Pan". It was first officially released on this EP.

== Track listing ==
All tracks are written by Don Van Vliet, except where noted.

Side one
No.	Title	Writer(s)	Length
1.	"Diddy Wah Diddy"	Willie Dixon, Ellas McDaniel	2:28
2.	"Who Do You Think You're Fooling?"		2:10

Side two
No.	Title	Writer(s)	Length
1.	"Moonchild"	David Gates	2:30
2.	"Frying Pan"		2:05
3.	"Here I Am I Always Am"		2:33

== Personnel ==
- Captain Beefheart (Don Van Vliet) – vocals, harmonica
- Doug Moon – guitar
- Richard Hepner – guitar
- Jerry Handley – bass
- Alex St. Clair Snouffer – drums (track 1–4)
- PG Blakely – drums (track 5)
