= Moonlight on Vermont =

Song by Captain Beefheart

from the album Trout Mask Replica
- Released: 16 June 1969
- Recorded: August 1968
- Genre: Blues
- Length: 3:59
- Label: Straight, Reprise
- Songwriter(s): Don Van Vliet, arranged by John French
- Producer(s): Frank Zappa

"Moonlight on Vermont" is a song by Captain Beefheart. It was released on his 1969 album Trout Mask Replica.

The song, along with "Sugar 'n Spikes", was written around December 1967.

The song is one of the most famous from Trout Mask Replica. It was also one of the songs from this era that Captain Beefheart and the Magic Band performed live.

"Moonlight on Vermont" was also released on the live album I'm Going to Do What I Wanna Do: Live at My Father's Place 1978. Pitchfork thought the band on that version "folds the cuttingly arrhythmic honks and squawks into traditional blues arcs that are only apparent after the 'riff' is over."

== Reception ==
Ultimate Classic Rock ranked the song number 8 on their list of Top 10 Captain Beefheart songs, calling it "swampy blues", with the amp turned up to 11.

Rolling Stone magazine also put "Moonlight on Vermont" on their list of Top 10 Essential Captain Beefheart Songs, writing that it was "abstract expressionist".

The music site Get into This called it possibly the best song on Trout Mask Replica.

Classic Rock ranked the song number 3 on their list of the Top 10 Captain Beefheart songs, writing that "Bill Harkleroad excels on guitar as Beefheart builds to a climax, bellowing out 'Gimme dat ole time religion' like a drunken fairground carny."
