= Ice Cream for Crow (song) =

Single by Captain Beefheart and The Magic Band

from the album Ice Cream for Crow
- Released: August 1982
- Length: 4:35
- Label: Epic; Virgin
- Songwriter(s): Don Van Vliet
- Producer(s): Don Van Vliet

Captain Beefheart and The Magic Band singles chronology
"Hard Workin' Man" (1978)	"Ice Cream for Crow" (1982)

"Ice Cream for Crow" is a song by Captain Beefheart and The Magic Band as the title track from their final album, 1982's Ice Cream for Crow. It was released in 1982 as the sole single for the album.

== Music video ==
The line-up of the band at the time made a music video, filmed on 7 August 1982 to promote the title track, which was directed by Van Vliet and Ken Schreiber, with cinematography by Daniel Pearl. It was rejected by MTV for being "too weird" on submission. However, the video was shown on a Letterman broadcast on NBC-TV to applause, and was also accepted into the Museum of Modern Art. Van Vliet announced "I don't want my MTV if they don't want my video" during his interview with Letterman, in reference to MTV's "I want my MTV" marketing campaign of the time. The video was shot on location in the Mojave Desert, California, near where Beefheart lived with his wife.

== Track listing ==
All tracks are written by Don Van Vliet.

No.	Title	Length
1.	"Ice Cream for Crow"	4:35
2.	"Light Reflected Off the Oceands of the Moon"	4:47
