= Shiny Beast (Bat Chain Puller) =

Studio album by Captain Beefheart and the Magic Band
- Released: October 1978
- Recorded: July – August 1978
- Studio: The Automatt, San Francisco
- Length: 47:20
- Label: Warner Bros. (US); Virgin (UK)
- Producer: Don Van Vliet; Pete Johnson

Captain Beefheart and the Magic Band chronology
Bongo Fury (1975)	Shiny Beast (Bat Chain Puller) (1978)	Doc at the Radar Station (1980)

Shiny Beast (Bat Chain Puller) is the tenth studio album by American band Captain Beefheart and the Magic Band, released in October 1978 by Warner Bros. Records. The album emerged from production difficulties surrounding Bat Chain Puller, an album Captain Beefheart recorded for DiscReet and Virgin Records in 1976. DiscReet co-founders Herb Cohen and Frank Zappa feuded over the production of the album, because Cohen funded the production with Zappa's royalty checks. Captain Beefheart recorded a new album titled Shiny Beast (Bat Chain Puller) after Zappa withheld the master tapes of the original Bat Chain Puller album.

== Background and recording ==
After recording Bongo Fury with Frank Zappa, Don Van Vliet formed a new Magic Band and began recording an album titled Bat Chain Puller for DiscReet and Virgin Records. Herb Cohen, DiscReet's co-founder and Zappa's business manager, paid for the album's production costs with Zappa's royalty checks, leading Zappa to end his business partnership with Cohen. Cohen and Zappa each demanded to be paid an advance by Virgin, leading Zappa to withhold the master tapes, for which Cohen sued him.

Shiny Beast (Bat Chain Puller) was recorded from July 6 to August 27, 1978, at the Automatt in San Francisco. Due to the lawsuit, Van Vliet re-recorded four Bat Chain Puller tracks for Warner Bros.: "The Floppy Boot Stomp", "Bat Chain Puller", "Harry Irene", and "Owed T'Alex". The Bat Chain Puller outtake "Candle Mambo" was also re-recorded for the album, as were older unused songs "Ice Rose" (a Strictly Personal outtake formerly known as "Big Black Baby Shoes") and "Suction Prints" (a Clear Spot outtake known as "Pompadour Swamp", no relation to the later song of that name). Four new songs completed the album, these being "You Know You're A Man", "When I See Mommy I Feel Like A Mummy", "Love Lies" and "Tropical Hot Dog Night", the latter being based on a riff of the Bat Chain Puller song "Odd Jobs", which was otherwise not re-recorded. The album was completed with "Apes-Ma", which is the same recording on both versions because it was sourced from Van Vliet's own home recording. Versions of "Run Paint Run Run" and "The Witch Doctor Life" were attempted during the sessions but not used (they have been bootlegged). They would be finished for Doc at the Radar Station and Ice Cream for Crow respectively.

== Style ==
The music of Shiny Beast featured a mix of different music styles, similar to Safe as Milk, incorporating elements of pop, spoken word and experimental music. The song "Bat Chain Puller" was based upon the rhythm of Van Vliet's windshield wipers.

== Reception ==
Professional ratings
Review scores
Source	Rating
AllMusic	4.5/5 stars
Christgau's Record Guide	A
DownBeat	5/5 stars
The Encyclopedia of Popular Music	3/5 stars
The Great Rock Bible	7.5/10
MusicHound Rock: The Essential Album Guide	3.5/5 stars
Record Mirror	4/5 stars
The Rolling Stone Album Guide	4/5 stars
Spin Alternative Record Guide	10/10

The album received favorable reviews. Robert Christgau declared Shiny Beast to be better than all Van Vliet's previous albums, writing, "Without any loss of angularity or thickness, the new compositions achieve a flow worthy of Weill or Monk or Robert Johnson, and his lyrics aren't as willful as they used to be." The Globe and Mail determined that Beefheart "is distinguished by the surprising poetic strength of his lyrics." The New York Times noted that the album "recaptured much of his old ferocity."

In his review for DownBeat, David Less wrote that Van Vliet's "lyrics are powerful and intriguing... Instrumentally the Magic Band is very sophisticated and a very tight unit... Tepper and Redus utilize contrasting lines to create a satisfying tension. The percussionists' emphasis is not strictly on timekeeping... The music is very structured but it seems to be built around the interaction of the artists and their ability to play together. Lines are woven and exchanged freely, with Beefheart as the single most cohesive factor. His vocals draw things together... Let it suffice to say Shiny Beast is an important alternative to contemporary popular music".

A contemporary reviewer, AllMusic's Ned Raggett, also praised the album, writing "Shiny Beast turned out to be manna from heaven for those feeling Beefheart had lost his way on his two Mercury albums". Trouser Press called it "one of his best".

In the Spin Alternative Record Guide (1995), the album was ranked 73 on the book's list of the "Top 100 Alternative Albums".

== Track listing ==
All tracks written by Don Van Vliet except "Owed t' Alex", written by Don Van Vliet and Herb Bermann.

Side one
No.	Title	Length
1.	"The Floppy Boot Stomp"	3:51
2.	"Tropical Hot Dog Night"	4:49
3.	"Ice Rose"	3:38
4.	"Harry Irene"	3:43
5.	"You Know You're a Man"	3:14
6.	"Bat Chain Puller"	5:27

Side two
No.	Title	Length
1.	"When I See Mommy I Feel Like a Mummy"	5:04
2.	"Owed t' Alex"	4:07
3.	"Candle Mambo"	3:24
4.	"Love Lies"	5:03
5.	"Suction Prints"	4:25
6.	"Apes-Ma"	0:40

== Personnel ==
- Captain Beefheart (Don Van Vliet) – vocals, harmonica, soprano sax, whistling
- Bruce Lambourne Fowler – trombone, air bass
- Jeff Moris Tepper – slide guitar, guitar, spell guitar
- Eric Drew Feldman – synthesizer, Rhodes piano, grand piano, bass
- Robert Arthur Williams – drums, percussion
- Richard Redus – slide guitar, bottleneck guitar, guitar, accordion, fretless bass

Additional personnel

- Art Tripp III – marimba, additional percussion
