= Doc at the Radar Station =

Studio album by Captain Beefheart and the Magic Band
- Released: August 1980
- Recorded: June 1980
- Studios: Sound Castle, Los Angeles
- Genres: Experimental rock; art rock; blues rock; post-punk
- Length: 38:52
- Label: Virgin
- Producer: Don Van Vliet

Captain Beefheart and the Magic Band chronology
Shiny Beast (Bat Chain Puller) (1978)	Doc at the Radar Station (1980)	Ice Cream for Crow (1982)

Professional ratings
Review scores
Source	Rating
AllMusic	4.5/5 stars
Christgau's Record Guide	A−
DownBeat	4.5/5 stars
The Encyclopedia of Popular Music	3/5 stars
The Great Rock Bible	7.5/10
Music Story	4/5 stars
MusicHound Rock	4.5/5 stars
Rolling Stone	4.5/5 stars
Spin Alternative Record Guide	9/10

Doc at the Radar Station is the eleventh studio album by Captain Beefheart and the Magic Band, released in August 1980 by Virgin Records.

== Background ==
Although about half of the album's songs are based on old musical ideas. Captain Beefheart biographer Mike Barnes states that "most of the revamping work [was] built on skeletal ideas and fragments ... [that] would have mouldered away in the vaults had they not been exhumed and transformed into full-blown, totally convincing new material". "A Carrot is as Close as a Rabbit Gets to a Diamond", "Flavor Bud Living" and "Brickbats" were originally recorded for the unreleased album Bat Chain Puller.

Original Magic Band drummer John French rejoined Beefheart for this album. He played guitar on all songs, plus bass guitar ("Sheriff of Hong Kong"), drums ("Ashtray Heart" and "Sheriff of Hong Kong"), and marimba ("Making Love to a Vampire with a Monkey on My Knee"). He also sings the second vocal on "Dirty Blue Gene".

== Artwork ==
The album cover was painted by Captain Beefheart. It was placed at number forty-nine on Rolling Stone's 1991 list of the "100 Greatest Album Covers".

== Critical reception ==
Cashbox characterized Doc at the Radar Station as "lunatic music, mixing atonal rock and avant beat poetry." Charles Carmen of DownBeat wrote that "though his vocals retain blues mannerisms and his lyrics employ a wacky (yet still traditional) blues hyperbole, Doc At The Radar Station displays throughout Beefheart's own voice: a coarse, incredibly intense speak-singing." He added that "for most tunes here, Beefheart writes catchy ostinatos which, since several are played simultaneously, seem to undermine each other. As these lines persist, they become more compatible, sometimes resolving into jagged unisons." He cited "Sheriff of King Kong" as an example of this approach.

== Reissues ==
In 2011, 4 Men with Beards released a 180-gram version of the album, distributed by City Hall Records.

== Track listing ==
All tracks are written by Don Van Vliet. Arranged by John French and Eric Drew Feldman.

Side one
No.	Title	Length
1.	"Hot Head"	3:23
2.	"Ashtray Heart"	3:25
3.	"A Carrot Is as Close as a Rabbit Gets to a Diamond"	1:38
4.	"Run Paint Run Run"	3:40
5.	"Sue Egypt"	2:57
6.	"Brickbats"	2:40

Side two
No.	Title	Length
1.	"Dirty Blue Gene"	3:51
2.	"Best Batch Yet"	5:02
3.	"Telephone"	1:31
4.	"Flavor Bud Living"	1:00
5.	"Sheriff of Hong Kong"	6:34
6.	"Making Love to a Vampire with a Monkey on My Knee"	3:11

== Personnel ==
- Captain Beefheart (Don Van Vliet) – vocals, Chinese gongs, harmonica, soprano saxophone, bass clarinet
- John French – slide guitar, guitar, bass guitar, drums (on "Ashtray Heart" and "Sheriff of Hong Kong"), marimba (on "Making Love To A Vampire With A Monkey On My Knee"), vocals on "Dirty Blue Gene" and "Run Paint Run Run"
- Jeff Moris Tepper – slide guitar, guitar, "nerve guitar", background vocals on "Run Paint Run Run"
- Eric Drew Feldman – synthesizer, bass guitar, Mellotron, grand piano, electric piano, background vocals on "Run Paint Run Run"
- Robert Arthur Williams – drums, background vocals on "Run Paint Run Run"

Additional personnel

- Gary Lucas – guitar (on "Flavor Bud Living"), French horn (on "Best Batch Yet")
- Bruce Fowler – trombone (on "Run Paint Run Run")
