= Bat Chain Puller =

Studio album by Captain Beefheart
- Released: February 22, 2012
- Recorded: March 1976
- Length: 41:12
- Label: VAULTernative
- Producer: Don Van Vliet; Kerry McNab

Captain Beefheart chronology
An Ashtray Heart (2011)	Bat Chain Puller (2012)	The Lost Broadcasts (2012)

Professional ratings
Review scores
Source	Rating
Pitchfork	(8.2/10)

Bat Chain Puller is the 13th studio album (and first official posthumous album) by Captain Beefheart, released on February 22, 2012. It was recorded in 1976 by DiscReet Records, who had intended to release it with Virgin Records as Captain Beefheart's tenth studio album. It was co-produced by Beefheart and Kerry McNab.

The album was a subject of friction between DiscReet cofounders Herb Cohen and Frank Zappa. Cohen had used Zappa's royalty checks to fund the album's production, and this led Zappa to withhold the master tapes from Virgin. Beefheart recorded a new album for Warner Bros. Shiny Beast (Bat Chain Puller), with no involvement from Cohen or Zappa.

Following a lawsuit which was settled in 1982, the album remained unreleased until 2012, after Zappa's family had announced in 2011 that they would release the original Bat Chain Puller in its intended form.

== Background ==
After recording the album Bongo Fury with Frank Zappa, Don Van Vliet formed a new Magic Band and began recording Bat Chain Puller for DiscReet and Virgin Records. Zappa described the proposed album as Van Vliet's best since Trout Mask Replica. Vliet co-produced it with Kerry McNab, who also served as the remix engineer on Zappa's album One Size Fits All. Herb Cohen, DiscReet's cofounder and Zappa's business manager, paid for the album's production costs with Zappa's royalty checks, leading Zappa to end his business partnership with Cohen. Cohen and Zappa each demanded to be paid an advance by Virgin, leading Zappa to withhold the master tapes, leading Cohen to sue Zappa.

Due to the lawsuit, Van Vliet rerecorded the Bat Chain Puller tracks for Warner Bros. Records under the title Shiny Beast (Bat Chain Puller).

In 1982, Cohen settled his lawsuit with Zappa, while Vliet was recording Ice Cream for Crow. Van Vliet intended to use half of the tracks from the original Bat Chain Puller album on Ice Cream For Crow, but Zappa refused Van Vliet's request. Vliet biographer Mike Barnes subsequently claimed that Van Vliet did not want the original album to be released.

On June 24, 2011, six months after Van Vliet's death, Zappa's widow Gail claimed that the original Bat Chain Puller would be released "[t]his year. December most likely"; in December it was announced for release on January 15, 2012, but was delayed and did not ship until February.

== Style ==
The song "Bat Chain Puller" was based upon the rhythm of the windshield wipers on Vliet's Volvo car.

== Track listing ==
All tracks by Don Van Vliet (a.k.a. Captain Beefheart)

No.	Title	Original release	Length
1.	"Bat Chain Puller"	Shiny Beast (Bat Chain Puller)	5:07
2.	"Seam Crooked Sam"	Previously Unreleased	3:09
3.	"Harry Irene"	Shiny Beast (Bat Chain Puller)	3:25
4.	"81 Poop Hatch"	Ice Cream for Crow	2:35
5.	"Flavor Bud Living"	Doc at the Radar Station	1:49
6.	"Brick Bats"	Doc at the Radar Station	4:27
7.	"Floppy Boot Stomp"	Shiny Beast (Bat Chain Puller)	3:57
8.	"Chariot (Ah Carrot Is As Close As Ah Rabbit Gets To Ah Diamond)"	Doc at the Radar Station	1:37
9.	"Owed T' Alex"	Shiny Beast (Bat Chain Puller)	3:19
10.	"Odd Jobs"	Previously Unreleased	5:14
11.	"Human Totem Pole (The 1000th And 10th Day Of The Human Totem Pole)"	Ice Cream for Crow	5:49
12.	"Apes-Ma"	Shiny Beast (Bat Chain Puller)	0:44

Bonus Tracks
No.	Title	...	Length
13.	"Bat Chain Puller (Alternate Mix)"	Previously Unreleased	5:05
14.	"Candle Mambo"	Shiny Beast (Bat Chain Puller)	3:25
15.	"Hobo-Ism"	Previously Unreleased	8:18

== Personnel ==
- Don Van Vliet – vocals, harmonica, soprano saxophone
- John "Drumbo" French – drums, percussion, guitar, music director
- Denny "Feelers Rebo" Walley – guitar, accordion
- Jeff Moris Tepper – guitar
- John Thomas – piano, Rhodes electric piano, Mini Moog
