= Grow Fins: Rarities 1965–1982 =

Box set by Captain Beefheart
- Released: May 18, 1999
- Recorded: 1965–1982
- Length: 234:12
- Label: Revanant

Captain Beefheart chronology
The Legendary A&M Sessions (1984)	Grow Fins: Rarities 1965–1982 (1999)	I'm Going to Do What I Wanna Do: Live at My Father's Place 1978 (2000)

Professional ratings
Review scores
Source	Rating
AllMusic	3.5/5 stars

Grow Fins: Rarities 1965–1982 is a 5-HDCD box set compiled from previously unreleased recordings by Captain Beefheart & the Magic Band. The featured material spans the band's entire career, but focuses mainly on their work up to the late 1960s and the sessions for Beefheart's best-known album, Trout Mask Replica (1969).

== Track listing ==
Disc one: Just Got Back From the City (1965-67)
No.	Title	Length
1.	"Obeah Man" (1966 demo)	2:46
2.	"Just Got Back from the City" (1966 demo)	1:55
3.	"I'm Glad" (1966 demo)	3:43
4.	"Triple Combination" (1966 demo)	2:50
5.	"Here I Am I Always Am" (early 1966 demo)	3:17
6.	"Here I Am I Always Am" (later 1966 demo)	2:33
7.	"Somebody in My Home" (live Avalon Ballroom '66)	3:03
8.	"Tupelo" (live Avalon Ballroom '66)	4:15
9.	"Evil" (live Avalon Ballroom '66)	2:33
10.	"Old Folks Boogie" (live Avalon Ballroom '67)	3:15
11.	"Call On Me" (1965 demo)	3:04
12.	"Sure 'Nuff 'n Yes I Do" (1967 demo)	2:11
13.	"Yellow Brick Road" (1967 demo)	1:45
14.	"Plastic Factory" (1967 demo)	2:57

Disc two: Electricity (1967-68)
No.	Title	Length
1.	"Electricity" (live at Cannes 1968)	3:42
2.	"Sure Nuff" (live at Cannes 1968)	3:00
3.	"Rollin n Tumblin" (Kidderminster 1968)	11:10
4.	"Electricity" (Kidderminster 1968)	3:42
5.	"You're Gonna Need Somebody on Your Bond" (Kidderminster 1968)	6:28
6.	"Kandy Korn" (Kidderminster 1968)	4:23
7.	"Korn Ring Finger" (1967 demo)	7:23

Disc three: Trout Mask House Sessions (1969)
No.	Title	Length
1.	"Hobo Chang Ba" and "Dachau Blues" tuning up"	4:59
2.	"'bush recording'"	8:18
3.	"Hair Pie: Bake 1"	5:04
4.	"Hair Pie: Bake 2"	2:44
5.	"'noodling'"	1:05
6.	"Hobo Chang Ba"	2:02
7.	""Hobo" practice"	1:58
8.	"Hobo Chang Ba" (take 2)	3:08
9.	"Dachau Blues"	2:06
10.	"Old Fart at Play"	1:23
11.	"'noodling'"	1:01
12.	"Pachuco Cadaver"	4:08
13.	"Sugar 'n Spikes"	2:40
14.	"'noodling'"	1:01
15.	"Sweet Sweet Bulbs"	2:31
16.	"Frownland" (take 1)	2:51
17.	"Frownland"	1:52
18.	"'noodling'"	1:11
19.	"Ella Guru"	2:33
20.	"'silence'"	0:09
21.	"She's Too Much for My Mirror"	1:30
22.	"'noodling'"	0:36
23.	"Steal Softly thru Snow"	2:22
24.	"'noodling'"	1:52
25.	"My Human Gets Me Blues"	2:54
26.	"'noodling'"	1:06
27.	"When Big Joan Sets Up"	4:32
28.	"'silence'"	0:05
29.	"Candy Man"	0:57
30.	"China Pig"	4:15

Disc four: Trout Mask House Sessions (Storytime Portion) (1969)
No.	Title	Length
1.	"Blimp playback"	5:09
2.	"Herb Alpert"	1:07
3.	"Septic tank"	0:51
4.	"We'll overdub it 3 times"	5:26

Disc four is an enhanced CD which also contains the following video material:
No.	Title	Length
1.	"Cannes Beach live '68" ("Electricity" and "Sure Nuff 'N Yes I Do")
2.	"Paris Bataclan live '73" ("Click Clack")
3.	"Detroit Tubeworks program, winter of late 1970/early 1971" ("When Big Joan Sets Up", "Woe Is Uh Me Bop" and "Bellerin Plain")
4.	"Amougies live '69" ("She's Too Much for My Mirror" and "My Human Gets Me Blues")

Disc five: Captain Beefheart & His Magic Band Grow Fins (1969-81)
No.	Title	Length
1.	"My Human Gets Me Blues" (live Amougies '69)	3:56
2.	"When Big Joan Sets Up" (live 'Detroit Tubeworks' 1971)	6:13
3.	"Woe Is Uh Me Bop" (live 'Detroit Tubeworks' 1971)	2:46
4.	"Bellerin Plain" (live 'Detroit Tubeworks' 1971)	3:26
5.	"Black Snake Moan I" (KHSU '72)	1:04
6.	"Grow Fins" (live Bickershaw '72)	5:12
7.	"Black Snake Moan II" (WBCN '72)	1:52
8.	"Spitball Scalped Uh Baby" (live, Bickershaw '72)	9:15
9.	"Harp Boogie I" (WBCN '72)	1:35
10.	"One Red Rose That I Mean" (Town Hall '72)	1:48
11.	"Harp Boogie II" (WBCN '72)	0:56
12.	"Natchez Burning" (WBCN '72)	0:46
13.	"Harp Boogie III" (1972 radio phone in)	0:53
14.	"Click Clack" (Paris, '73)	2:53
15.	"Orange Claw Hammer" ('75 from radio with Zappa on acoustic guitar)	4:39
16.	"Odd Jobs" (Don piano demo, '76)	5:13
17.	"Odd Jobs" (full band demo '76)	5:12
18.	"Vampire Suite" (1980 worktapes/live)	3:49
19.	"Mellotron Improv" (live '78)	1:25
20.	"Evening Bell" (Don piano demo '81)	0:57
21.	"Evening Bell" (Lucas worktape '81)	2:18
22.	"Mellotron Improv" (live '80)	2:23
23.	"Flavor Bud Living" (live '81)	1:17
