= Berbalang =

Philippine mythical creature

Creature information
- Grouping: Philippine ghoul

Origin
- Region: Mapun, Mindanao

The Berbalangs are mythical creatures in the Philippines.

== Description ==
Published information on the subject is based on a single report by Ethelbert Forbes Skertchly, a resident of Hong Kong and an officer in the British Navy, son of the better known Sydney Barber Josiah Skertchly. E. F. Skertchly discussed the Berbalangs in an article published in 1896 by the Asiatic Society of Bengal. According to that report, based on Skertchly's visit to the island of Cagayan Sulu, now known as Mapun,

At the center of the island is a small village, the inhabitants of which owe allegiance to neither of the two chiefs. These people are called 'Berbalangs', and the Cagayans live in great fear of them. These Berbalangs are a kind of ghouls, and feed on human flesh occasionally to survive. You can always identify them, because the pupils of their eyes are not round, but just narrow slits like those of a cat. They dig open the graves and eat the entrails of the corpses; but in Cagayan the supply is limited. So when they feel the craving for a feed of human flesh they go away into the grasslands, and, having carefully hidden themselves, hold their breaths and fall into a trance. Their astral bodies are then liberated.... They fly away, and entering a house make their way into the body of one of the occupants and feed on their entrails..... The arrival of the Berbalangs may be heard from afar, as they make a moaning noise which is loud from a distance but dies away into a feeble moan as they approach. When they are near you the sound of their wings may be heard and the flashing lights of their eyes can be seen like dancing fire-flies in the dark. Should you be the happy possessor of a cocoa-nut pearl you are safe, but otherwise the only way to beat them off is to jab at them with a kris, the blade of which has been rubbed with the juice of a lime. If you see the lights and hear the moaning in front of you, wheel fast and make a cut in the opposite direction. Berbalangs always go by contraries and are never where they appear to be.

The cocoa-nut pearl, a stone like an opal sometimes found in the cocoa-nut, is the only really efficacious charm against their attacks; and it is only of value to the finder, as its magic powers cease when it is given away. When the finder dies the pearl loses its luster and becomes dead. The juice of limes sprinkled on a grave will prevent the Berbalangs from entering it, so all the dead are buried either under or near the houses, and the graves are sprinkled daily with fresh lime juice.

== Influence of Skertchly's description ==
The report by E. F. Skertchly is unusual in that he wrote as if he had personally witnessed some of the supernatural powers associated with the Berbalangs. The Scottish writer Andrew Lang introduced the Berbalangs as a plot point in the story "Adventure of the Fair American", included in the book The Disentanglers (1902). In that book, Lang explicitly cites Skertchley's account of the Berbalangs of Cagayan Sulu.

Skertchly's article in the Journal of the Asiatic Society of Bengal also attracted the attention of English academic and ghost-story writer M. R. James, who in turn introduced it to Rupert T. Gould circa 1911. Gould discussed the subject and reproduced Skertchly's account of the Berbalangs in a chapter of his popular book Oddities, first published in 1928. Modern awareness of the Berbalang lore largely derives from Gould's book.

== In popular culture ==
- The Berbalang was included as a monster in the popular fantasy game Dungeons & Dragons.
- An episode of the TV show Legacies references Dungeons & Dragons to introduce Berbalangs, which serve as the monster of the week for that episode.
