= UPN Kids =

1995–1999 Sunday morning children's block

- UPN Kids logo. Its slogan was UPN Kids is Up'n! (pronounced ooh-pin), and was used from 1996–1998
- Network: UPN
- Launched: September 10, 1995; 31 years ago
- Closed: September 5, 1999; 27 years ago
- Country of origin: United States
- Format: Sunday children's programming block
- Running time: 1–2 hours

UPN Kids was an American children's programming block that aired on UPN from September 10, 1995 to September 5, 1999. Airing on Sunday mornings, the block aired for one hour (10:00 to 11:00 am), then two hours the following year (9:00 to 11:00 a.m., regardless of time zone).

== History ==
UPN Kids launched on September 10, 1995 with a one-hour block of cartoons consisting of Space Strikers and Teknoman. It was a joint partnership between UPN and Saban Entertainment. Unlike NBC, ABC, CBS, Fox and The WB (the latter of which debuted its own children's program block, Kids' WB, the day before UPN Kids made its debut), UPN ran its weekend morning children's programs on Sundays instead of Saturdays. This was likely due to several UPN affiliates in large markets also dually carrying the Fox Kids block for newer Fox stations (especially those of New World Communications; the former Fox affiliates in those markets mainly also retained the Fox Kids schedule) on Saturday mornings, who is not carrying Fox Kids to instead expand Saturday morning newscasts or retain other local programming. This eventually proved to be a conflict for UPN, as the more well-known Fox Kids block was given primacy in advertising and promotions by those affiliates (including the continuation of the local children's Fox Kids fan clubs run by those stations) over UPN's unproven children's programming.

On September 8, 1996, UPN Kids expanded the block to 2 hours with four new programs, which consist of Jumanji, The Mouse and the Monster, The Incredible Hulk and Bureau of Alien Detectors. In 1997, UPN incorporated live-action series aimed at teenagers, along with the animated shows targeted at a younger audience, with the addition of reruns of the syndicated dramedy series Sweet Valley High (based on the young adult novels by Francine Pascal) and a new comedy series, Breaker High (focused on a group of students attending a fictionalized Semester at Sea program, which featured a then-unknown Ryan Gosling among its main cast).

In January 1998, UPN began discussions with The Walt Disney Company (owner of rival network ABC) to have the company program a daily two-hour children's block for the network; however, attempts to reach a time-lease agreement deal with Disney were called off one week later due to a dispute between Disney and UPN over how the block would be branded and the amount of programming compliant with the Federal Communications Commission's educational programming regulations that Disney would provide for the block. UPN then entered into discussions with then-corporate sister Nickelodeon (both were owned by Viacom). UPN had an agreement with Saban Entertainment – the distributor of Sweet Valley High and Breaker High – to program the Sunday morning block for at least one year. Shows such as Fantastic Four, Iron Man, X-Men, Spider-Man and His Amazing Friends, Spider-Man and Beetleborgs soon joined the schedule. During this time, the block was promoted as The UPN Kids Action Zone.

In March 1998, UPN resumed discussions with Disney and the following month, The Walt Disney Company agreed to develop a weekday and Sunday morning children's block for the network. A new lineup, which was developed as a companion block to Disney's One Saturday Morning on ABC, was originally announced under the title "Whomptastic" (a title quickly discarded because it was used as an in-universe profanity replacement in Disney's animated series Recess), before being retitled as Disney's One Too. UPN Kids aired for the last time on September 5, 1999, and was replaced by Disney's One Too the following day.

== Programming ==
=== Former programming ===
- Jumanji (1996– 1998)

==== Marvel Entertainment ====
- The Incredible Hulk (1996– 1999)
- Fantastic Four (1998-1999)
- Iron Man (1999)
- Spider-Man (1998–1999)
- Spider-Man and His Amazing Friends (1998–1999)
- X-Men (1998–1999)

==== Saban Entertainment ====
- Bureau of Alien Detectors (1996–1997)
- The Mouse and the Monster (1996–1997)
- Sweet Valley High (1997–1998)
- Beetleborgs (1998–1999)
- Breaker High (1997–1998)
- Space Strikers (1995-1996)
- Teknoman (1995-1996)
