= Ice Cream for Crow =

Studio album by Captain Beefheart and the Magic Band
- Released: September 1982
- Recorded: May–June, 1982
- Studios: Warner Brothers, North Hollywood, California
- Length: 37:29
- Labels: Virgin (UK), Virgin/Epic (US)
- Producer: Don Van Vliet

Captain Beefheart and the Magic Band chronology
Doc at the Radar Station (1980)	Ice Cream for Crow (1982)	The Legendary A&M Sessions (1984)

Singles from Ice Cream for Crow
- 1. "Ice Cream for Crow" Released: August 1982

Ice Cream for Crow is the twelfth studio album by Captain Beefheart and the Magic Band, released in September 1982, the final one released during his lifetime. After it was recorded, Don Van Vliet retired from music to devote himself to a career as a painter. It spent two weeks in the UK album charts, reaching number 90, but failed to make the Billboard Top 200.

== Production ==
While Ice Cream for Crow was being produced, Herb Cohen had settled his lawsuit with Frank Zappa over the latter withholding the master tapes to Captain Beefheart's unreleased Bat Chain Puller album. As a cost-saving measure, Don Van Vliet proposed that three recordings from Bat Chain Puller – "Human Totem Pole", "Odd Jobs", and "81 Poop Hatch" – be included on Ice Cream for Crow. Zappa ultimately refused this request, and Vliet was left to rework an outtake version of "Human Totem Pole", and hastily compose "Skeleton Makes Good" in one evening (although the acapella "81 Poop Hatch" was in fact included from Vliet's own copy of the Bat Chain Puller tape). The songs "Ice Cream for Crow", "Semi-Multicolored Caucasian", "The Past Sure Is Tense" and "The Witch Doctor Life" had also been written for earlier albums but not used.

According to Vliet's biographer Mike Barnes, "the most original and vital tracks [on the album] are the newer ones." Thus, Ice Cream for Crow, while rooted in past musical ideas, points toward a new musical direction for Captain Beefheart and the Magic Band. Indeed, Barnes writes that the album "feels like an hors-d'oeuvre for a main course that never came".

== Release and promotion ==
The album cover features a painting by Van Vliet and a portrait photo of him by Anton Corbijn. A music video was made to promote the title track, directed by Van Vliet and Ken Schreiber, with cinematography by Daniel Pearl, which was rejected by MTV for being "too weird". However, the video was included in the Letterman broadcast on NBC-TV, and was accepted into the Museum of Modern Art, where it has been used in several of their programs related to music. Van Vliet explained in a 1982 interview on Late Night with David Letterman that the album's title represented the contrast between the black of a crow and the white of vanilla ice cream.

== Reception ==
Professional ratings
Review scores
Source	Rating
AllMusic	4.5/5 stars
Robert Christgau	A−
The Rolling Stone Album Guide	4/5 stars
Spin Alternative Record Guide	9/10

Robert Christgau gave the album an A−, saying, "Ornette or no Ornette, the Captain's sprung delta atonality still provides surprising and irreducible satisfactions, but his poetry repeats itself more than his ideas warrant. Any surrealist ecologist who preaches the same sermon every time out is sure to provoke hostile questions from us concrete-jungle types." The New York Times wrote that "the stripped-down instrumentation and the absence of decoration in Cliff R. Martinez's sparse drumming serve to emphasize the classicism of the melodies and rhythmic patterns." The Globe and Mail noted that "the real strength of Captain Beefheart ... is his mind-boggling and apocalyptic lyrics, which often suggest the hallucinogenic humorous, scatalogical and dreadful spiels of William Burroughs." The Boston Phoenix, after first noting Captain Beefheart's lack of commercial success ("15 years of eloquent adulation — and misguided fixation — have failed to get this oddball bouncing on the charts"), opined that Ice Cream for Crow "is not going to lift him out of the drink. But it will certainly keep him from slipping under."

Ned Raggett of AllMusic called the album "a last entertaining blast of wigginess from one of the few truly independent artists in late 20th century pop music, with humor, skill, and style all still intact", with the Magic Band "turning out more choppy rhythms, unexpected guitar lines, and outré arrangements, Captain Beefheart lets everything run wild as always, with successful results". Raggett says that Beefheart's "entertainingly outrageous" spoken word performances are successfully cohered with the Magic Band's "insanely great arrangement." Disc jockey John Peel, in his narration to the BBC documentary The Artist Formerly Known as Captain Beefheart, called Ice Cream for Crow one of Captain Beefheart's best albums.

== Track listing ==
All tracks are written by Don Van Vliet.

Side one
No.	Title	Length
1.	"Ice Cream for Crow"	4:35
2.	"The Host the Ghost the Most Holy-O"	2:25
3.	"Semi-Multicoloured Caucasian"	4:20
4.	"Hey Garland, I Dig Your Tweed Coat"	3:13
5.	"Evening Bell"	2:00
6.	"Cardboard Cutout Sundown"	2:38

Side two
No.	Title	Length
7.	"The Past Sure Is Tense"	3:21
8.	"Ink Mathematics"	1:40
9.	"The Witch Doctor Life"	2:38
10.	"'81 Poop Hatch"	2:39
11.	"The Thousandth and Tenth Day of the Human Totem Pole"	5:42
12.	"Skeleton Makes Good"	2:18

Bonus track on remastered version
No.	Title	Length
13.	"Light Reflected Off the Oceands of the Moon"	4:47

== Personnel ==
- Captain Beefheart (Don Van Vliet) – vocals, harmonica, soprano sax, Chinese gongs, prop horn
- Jeff Moris Tepper – steel appendage guitar, slide guitar, acoustic guitar
- Richard "Midnight Hatsize" Snyder – bass guitar, marimba, viola
- Gary Lucas – glass-finger guitar, slide guitar, guitar, National steel duolian
- Cliff R. Martinez – drums, shake bouquet, glass washboard, metal drums

Additional personnel

- Eric Drew Feldman – Rhodes piano, synthesized bass on "The Thousandth and Tenth Day of the Human Totem Pole"
- Janet Van Vliet and Jeff Moris Tepper – production assistance
- Don Van Vliet – arranger and producer
- Phil Brown – engineer and mastering

(The descriptions "steel-appendage guitar" and "glass-finger guitar" were Beefheartian coinages for slide guitar, respectively using a metal tube or a glass "bottleneck" on the fret finger. Similarly, "shake bouquet" is his name for the maracas.)
