= The Chameleons discography =

- Studio albums: 4
- EPs: 2
- Live albums: 13
- Compilation albums: 8
- Singles: 8
- Video albums: 8
- Other albums: 3

This is the discography of English rock band the Chameleons.

== Albums ==
=== Studio albums ===
Title	Album details	Peak chart positions	
Title	Album details	UK	UK Indie
Script of the Bridge	Released: 8 August 1983; Label: Statik; Formats: LP, MC	—	11
What Does Anything Mean? Basically	Released: 20 May 1985; Label: Statik; Formats: CD, LP, MC	60	2
Strange Times	Released: 1 September 1986; Label: Geffen; Formats: LP, MC	44	—
Why Call It Anything	Released: 1 July 2001; Label: Artful; Formats: CD	—	—
Arctic Moon	Released: 12 September 2025; Label: Metropolis Records; Formats: CD, LP	—	—
"—" denotes releases that did not chart.

=== Live albums ===
Title	Album details
Tripping Dogs	Released: October 1990; Label: Glass Pyramid; Formats: CD, LP, MC
Here Today... Gone Tomorrow	Released: 8 June 1992; Label: Imaginary; Formats: CD, LP, MC
Live in Toronto	Released: 8 June 1992; Label: Imaginary; Formats: CD, LP, MC
The Radio 1 Evening Show Sessions	Released: January 1993; Label: Nighttracks; Formats: CD
Aufführung in Berlin	Released: June 1993; Label: Imaginary; Formats: CD, LP
Live Shreds	Released: 9 April 1996; Label: Cleopatra; Formats: CD; US-only release
Recorded Live at the Gallery Club Manchester, 18th December 1982	Released: August 1996; Label: Visionary Communications; Formats: CD
Live at the Witchwood	Released: 2000; Label: Self-released; Formats: CD
Live at the Academy	Released: March 2002; Label: Paradiso; Formats: 2xCD
Live from the Camden Palace	Released: August 2016; Label: The Store for Music; Formats: digital download
Live at the Hacienda	Released: 22 April 2017; Label: Radiation; Formats: LP
Elevated Living: Live in Manchester, London & Spain	Released: 24 September 2021; Label: Cherry Red; Formats: 2xCD+DVD, digital download
Edge Sessions (Live from the Edge)	Released: 15 April 2022; Label: Metropolis; Formats: CD, 2xLP, digital download; US-only release
Live at the Camden Palace	Released: 21 March 2022; Label: Moochin' About; Formats: 2xLP 180g Splattered Vinyl

=== Compilation albums ===
Title	Album details
The Fan and the Bellows	Released: 21 March 1986; Label: Hybrid; Formats: CD, LP, MC
John Peel Sessions	Released: November 1990; Label: Strange Fruit; Formats: CD, LP, MC
Here Today... Gone Tomorrow / Live in Toronto	Released: June 1992; Label: Imaginary; Formats: 2xCD, 2xLP
Dali's Picture / Live in Berlin	Released: June 1993; Label: Imaginary; Formats: 2xCD
Northern Songs	Released: November 1994; Label: Bone Idol; Formats: CD
Return of the Roughnecks: The Best of the Chameleons	Released: January 1997; Label: Dead Dead Good; Formats: CD, 2xCD
Acoustic Sessions	Released: 5 November 2010; Label: Blue Apple Music; Formats: 2xCD
Dreams in Celluloid: A Collection of Rare Recordings	Released: 17 June 2013; Label: Blue Apple Music; Formats: 2xCD

=== Video albums ===
Title	Album details
Live at the Camden Palace	Released: January 1985; Label: Jettisoundz Video; Formats: VHS
Arsenal	Released: 1995; Label: Visionary Communications; Formats: VHS
Recorded Live at the Gallery Club Manchester, 18th December 1982	Released: 1996; Label: Visionary Communications; Formats: VHS
Resurrection Live	Released: 2001; Label: Paradiso; Formats: VHS
Live at the Gallery Club & the Hacienda, Manchester	Released: October 2002; Label: Cherry Red Films; Formats: DVD
Live from London	Released: October 2004; Label: Demon Vision; Formats: DVD
Singing Rule Britannia – The Chameleons Live	Released: June 2004; Label: Cherry Red Films; Formats: DVD
Ascension	Released: October 2006; Label: The Scourge Productions; Formats: 2xDVD

=== Other albums ===
Title	Album details
Dali's Picture	Released: June 1993; Label: Imaginary; Formats: CD, LP; Original demo album
Strip	Released: May 2000; Label: Paradiso; Formats: CD, LP; Album of acoustic arrangements
This Never Ending Now	Released: September 2002; Label: Paradiso/Universal; Formats: CD; Album of acoustic arrangements

== EPs ==
Title	EP details
Tony Fletcher Walked on Water.... La La La La La-La La-La-La	Released: 1 October 1990; Label: Glass Pyramid; Formats: 12", CD
Where Are You?	Released: 24 May 2024; Label: Metropolis Records; Formats: LP, digital download
Tomorrow Remember Yesterday	Released: 11 October 2024; Label: Metropolis Records; Formats: Digital download

== Singles ==
Title	Year	Peak chart positions		Album
Title	Year	UK	UK Indie	Album
"In Shreds"	1982	—	—	Non-album single
"As High as You Can Go"	1983	—	7	Script of the Bridge
"A Person Isn't Safe Anywhere These Days"	1983	—	—	Script of the Bridge
"Up the Down Escalator"	1983	181	—	Script of the Bridge
"Nostalgia"/"In Shreds"	1985	—	11	Non-album single
"Singing Rule Britannia (While the Walls Close In)"	1985	—	2	What Does Anything Mean? Basically
"Tears"	1986	85	—	Strange Times
"Swamp Thing"	1986	82	—	Strange Times
"—" denotes releases that did not chart.
