= Anchor (Trespassers William album) =

Studio album by Trespassers William
- Released: November 30, 1999
- Genre: Rock
- Length: 44:24
- Label: Sonikwire Records
- Producer: Trespassers William and Jeff McCullough

Trespassers William chronology
Anchor (1999)	Different Stars (2002)

Anchor is the first album by Trespassers William, released in 1999 on Sonikwire Records. The album is long out of print, but has found new life on iTunes, due to their exposure on The O.C. and One Tree Hill. While no songs from Anchor are on either show, fans of their sound have sought out previous releases.

While there is growing interest for the album to be re-printed, the band has yet to do so. The band's guitarist, Matt Brown, said on KEXP that "...we've been hesitant to re-press it because we made it about ten years ago..."

Compared to the band's later albums, Different Stars and Having, it can be seen as being more pop than the sound they later had. Tracks such as "Cabinet" have funk-style bass-lines.

== Track listing ==
1. "I Know" – 5:04
2. "Desert" – 3:54
3. "Anchor" – 5:39
4. "Washes Away" – 4:13
5. "Cabinet" – 3:53
6. "Broken" – 4:57
7. "My Eyes Were Closed" – 3:02
8. "It's Been a Shame" – 3:26
9. "Umbrella" – 4:30
10. "Stay, There's Nowhere Else" – 5:32

"I Know" and "Washes Away" were used in two episodes in the sixth season of the television show Buffy the Vampire Slayer (episodes 11 and 15).

== Personnel ==
- Josh Gordon, Justin Schier and Matt Brown – art direction
- Jeff McCullough – recording and mixing (tracks 1, 2, 3, 4, 7, 10)
- Eli Thompson – mixing (tracks 5, 8, and 9)
- Justin Schier and Josh Gordon – mixing (track 6)
- Anna-Lynne Williams – lyrics
