= Martin Glyn Murray =

Danish-born British actor (born 1966)

Martin Glyn Murray (born 1 February 1966 in Helsingør) is a Danish-born British actor who has played Mark Thompson in Families and he has also been in The Bill, Sharpe, Aristocrats, Enigma, Enemy at the Gates, Captain Corelli's Mandolin, Made in Estonia and Heartbeat. He also enjoyed some chart success as the lead guitarist in The Mock Turtles, most notably with the single "Can You Dig It?".
