= Martin Coogan =

- Born: 16 September 1960 (age 65); Middleton, Lancashire, England
- Genres: Indie rock
- Instrument(s): Vocals, guitar, percussion
- Years active: 1985–2003
- Labels: Mynah; Imaginary; Virgin

Martin Joseph Coogan (born 16 September 1960) is a musician and radio presenter. He produces and records at the Vibe Recording Studios, Manchester, which he has owned since 2008.

Born and brought up in Middleton, Coogan attended Cardinal Langley RC Grammar School, as did his younger brothers, Steve and Brendan.

Coogan's first professional music role was in 1985, as the singer for Judge Happiness. After leaving Judge Happiness, Coogan led indie rock band the Mock Turtles, whose 1991 song "Can You Dig It?" reached number 18 on the UK Singles Chart.

Coogan was presenter of the breakfast show on The Revolution in Oldham until the station was bought by Steve Penk, who took over the show himself. In October 2008, he joined Phil Beckett in presenting the regular late programme Radio Republic on 103.6FM Tameside Radio.

In 2001, Coogan appeared in the Identity Parade section of BBC TV's comedy panel game Never Mind the Buzzcocks.
