= Black Swan Lane =

- Origin: Atlanta, Georgia, USA; Middleton, Greater Manchester, England
- Genres: indie rock, alternative rock, gothic rock
- Years active: 2007-present
- Label: Eden Records
- Members: Jack Sobel; John Kolbeck
- Past members: Mark Burgess; Yves Altana; Kwasi Asante; Achim Faerber; Andy Clegg; Andy Whitaker; Lauren Fay
- Website: Black Swan Lane Official website

Black Swan Lane is a US/UK indie rock band/project founded in 2007 by Jack Sobel and John Kolbeck (formerly of The Messengers), and Mark Burgess (formerly of The Chameleons, The Sun and the Moon, and Bird).

For their first release, Long Way From Home, issued in 2007 by Eden Records, Sobel, Kolbeck and Burgess were joined by three Burgess associates: Yves Altana, Achim Faerber and percussionist Kwasi Asante. Vocalist Anna-Lynne Williams (of Trespassers William) guested on the song Fakers.

In 2009, In the Ether, a track from the first album, was featured in the film Adventureland.

In November 2008, Sobel and Burgess were joined by Andy Whitaker and Andy Clegg to reform the Sun and the Moon for a one-off US show in Sobel's hometown of Atlanta, Georgia. During practice sessions for the show, several new songs were written which later became the basis for Black Swan Lane's second album, The Sun and the Moon Sessions, released in June 2009. Asante also collaborated on this album.

In April 2010, the band released their third album, Things You Know and Love, to critical acclaim.

In July 2010, Black Swan Lane became official website sponsors of UK-based non-league football club Didcot Town. This sponsorship was extended for the 2011-2012 and 2012-2013 football seasons, and in the 2017-2018 season, the band sponsored the club's First Team shirt.

In August 2011, the band released their fourth studio album, Staring Down the Path of Sound. For the first time, Burgess did not participate. Sobel and Kolbeck were joined by Lauren Fay, who provided additional backing vocals.

In May 2013, BSL's fifth studio album, The Last Time in Your Light, was released. It was recorded at Atlanta's Flood Studio and mixed by Jeff Tomei. Sobel and Kolbeck were the only founders remaining on the project.

In September 2014, the band released their sixth album, A Moment of Happiness, again recorded at Flood Studio with Sobel and Kolbeck remaining the sole collaborators.

After a break of three years, the band's seventh album, Under My Fallen Sky, was released in November 2017.

Vita Eterna was released in November 2019 once again receiving much acclaim. Sobel was joined for the band's 8th album by John Kolbeck, Jason Monseur, Jerry Tew and John Hamm. For the first time the band also featured ex-Chameleons UK guitarist, Dave Fielding, who played electric guitar and his signature E-bow on eleven of the thirteen tracks. Backing vocals were provided by Krissy Vanderwoude, Lauren Fay and Gretchen Copeland with additional lyrics by Alessandro Dematteis.

Albums nine Hide in View, ten Blind and eleven Dead Souls Collide were each released approximately a year apart from Nov 2021 - Dec 2023. Sobel wrote and recorded all three albums alone following the departure of long-time collaborator Kolbeck.

== Discography ==
=== Albums ===
- 2007 A Long Way from Home (Eden Records)
- 2009 The Sun and the Moon Sessions (Eden Records)
- 2010 Things You Know and Love (Eden Records)
- 2011 Staring Down the Path of Sound (Eden Records)
- 2013 The Last Time in Your Light (Eden Records)
- 2014 A Moment of Happiness (Eden Records)
- 2017 Under My Fallen Sky (Eden Records)
- 2019 Vita Eterna (Eden Records)
- 2021 Hide in View (Black Swan Lane)
- 2022 Blind (Black Swan Lane)
- 2023 Dead Souls Collide (Black Swan Lane)
- 2025 "The Messenger" (Black Swan Lane)
