= Annapolis (2006 film) =

- Theatrical release poster
- Directed by: Justin Lin
- Written by: Dave Collard
- Produced by: Damien Saccani; Mark Vahradian
- Starring: James Franco; Tyrese Gibson; Jordana Brewster; Donnie Wahlberg; Chi McBride; Vicellous Shannon
- Cinematography: Phil Abraham
- Edited by: Fred Raskin
- Music by: Brian Tyler
- Production company: Touchstone Pictures
- Distributed by: Buena Vista Pictures Distribution
- Release date: January 27, 2006
- Running time: 103 minutes
- Country: United States
- Language: English
- Budget: $26 million
- Box office: $17 million

Annapolis is a 2006 American drama film directed by Justin Lin and starring James Franco, Tyrese Gibson, Jordana Brewster, Donnie Wahlberg, Roger Fan, and Chi McBride. The film revolves around Jake Huard, a young man who attends the United States Naval Academy in Annapolis, Maryland. The film was released January 27, 2006, in the United States, and bombed both critically and commercially.

== Plot ==
Jake Huard wakes up after being knocked down during a boxing match. After beating his opponent, he returns to the home he shares with his distant father, who is also his employer at a naval shipyard, building vessels for the Navy and doubts Jake's ability to amount to anything.

Huard is visited by Lieutenant Commander Burton, telling Jake that his application to the U.S. Naval Academy at Annapolis, Maryland has been recently accepted. At a bar where Huard and his friends are celebrating, his friends introduce him to a young woman named Ali, whom they claim is a prostitute hired as a going-away present. Huard's attempts to seduce Ali are unsuccessful, and his farewell with his father leaves him frustrated.

On his first day at the academy, Huard discovers that one of his instructors Ali, a Midshipman 2nd Class (an upperclassman), is the same woman that his friends introduced him to. She and her fellow instructor, Whitaker, begin hazing Huard's class of plebes. The strain of the program causes Huard to fall to the bottom of the class academically. Their company commander, Midshipman Lieutenant Cole, had been an enlisted Marine prior to joining the academy, and he announces his intent to run out any midshipman he deems unfit to be an officer. Huard's roommates include overweight Nance (nicknamed Twins), Loo, and Estrada, who is being singled out by Whitaker because of his ethnicity.

Estrada is ordered to cleanse himself of a perceived stench. Although unable to do so, he nonetheless reports he completed the task. Loo informs Cole of Estrada's dishonesty, and Estrada is processed out of the Naval Academy. Meanwhile, Huard's class becomes increasingly frustrated from suffering due to his failures, as evidenced by Loo moving out of the room. Nance explains his refusal to leave by noting that the instructors are so focused on Huard that they are leaving him alone. While home on winter leave, Huard intends not to return until he discovers that his father made a wager, expecting Huard to fail. Upon his return, the class begins instruction in boxing, and it is announced that a midshipman tournament, the Brigades, will occur at the end of the year. After Huard angers the boxing instructor with some unsportsmanlike conduct toward Cole in the ring, he is forced to train by himself.

During an after-hours match with Burton, Huard swallows his pride and admits he needs help training, enlisting Ali and Burton for physical training, and Nance to gain enough weight to be in Cole's weight class. In his match with Loo, he endures some taunting and returns with a single-punch knockout, earning him Loo's respect and support. Huard also begins to excel in his classes, gaining respect with the rest of his class when he proves capable of performing academically. During the tournament, Jake progresses and defeats Whitaker in the semifinals, leaving him and Cole for the final match.

After Nance fails by just four seconds to successfully complete the obstacle course, Cole informs Nance that he will be kicked out from the academy. Nance attempts suicide, prompting Huard to tackle Cole in anger. Expecting to be kicked out as well, Huard begins to pack up and leave, until Cole approaches him and informs him that his discplinary hearing will take place after the final Brigades match. After some encouragement from the recovering Nance, Huard steps into the ring to fight Cole, lasting a full three rounds. Although Cole wins by decision, Huard's boxing ability earns him the respect of the entire Academy, as well as his father, who has come to see the fight.

At his hearing, the disciplinary board decides to retain Huard, based on Cole's recommendation. The Class of 2008 celebrates the end of their Plebe year, while Huard and Ali finally express their mutual attraction openly. Huard approaches newly-commissioned Second Lieutenant Cole to ask who would have won if the fight had continued, to which Cole challenges Huard to join the Marines to find out.

== Cast ==
- James Franco as Midshipman 4th Class Jake Huard
- Tyrese Gibson as Midshipman 1st Class / 2nd Lieutenant Matthew Cole
- Jordana Brewster as Midshipman 2nd Class Alison "Ali" Halloway
- Vicellous Reon Shannon as "Twins" / Marcus Nance
- Roger Fan as Loo
- Wilmer Calderon as Estrada
- Donnie Wahlberg as Lieutenant Commander Burton
- Chi McBride as McNally
- Brian Goodman as Bill Huard
- Billy Finnigan as Kevin
- Rocco Rosanio as Jake's Friend
- Jim Parrack as A.J.
- Charles Napier as Supt. Carter
- Heather Henderson as Daniels
- McCaleb Burnett as Whitaker
- Matt Myers as Mr. Nance
- John Fahy as Midshipman
- Nick Colonna as Extra

== Music ==
A score album Brian Tyler was released, January 24, 2006.

Other music used in the film

- "Nowhere Ride" - The Chelsea Smiles
- "More Human than Human" - White Zombie
- "When I'm Gone" - No Address
- "Just Stop" - Disturbed
- "Different Stars" - Trespassers William
- "Somersault" - Zero 7
- "Born Too Slow" - The Crystal Method
- "Hero of the Day" - Metallica
- "Start Something" - Lostprophets

== Reception ==
=== Box office ===
Annapolis grossed $17.5 million worldwide. It made $7.7 million in its opening weekend, finishing fourth, then $3.4 million and $1.4 million in the following weekends.

=== Critical response ===
On Rotten Tomatoes the film has an approval rating of 10% based on 113 reviews, with an average rating of 3.9/10. The site's critics consensus reads, "Stocked with leading men who look the part but lacking an iota of original plot, Annapolis is merely a watery shadow of superior seafaring military dramas." On Metacritic the film has a weighted average score of 37 out of 100, based on 28 critics, indicating "generally unfavorable" reviews. Audiences polled by CinemaScore gave the film an average grade of "B+" on an A+ to F scale.

Brian Lowry of Variety wrote: "James Franco and Tyrese Gibson scowl and strut and should make the hearts of teenage girls all atwitter, and that's about the only audience that won't see most of the punches telegraphed well in advance." Roger Ebert of the Chicago Sun-Times gave the film 1.5 out of 4, and wrote: "It is the anti-Sundance film, an exhausted wheeze of bankrupt cliches and cardboard characters, the kind of film that has no visible reason for existing, except that everybody got paid."

=== Navy response ===
Upon reviewing the script, the Chief of Naval Information commented:

This picture was made without the support of the Department of the Navy and the Department of Defense ... the story depicted in the script did not accurately portray the Academy, its standards for training, and its methods of shaping midshipmen mentally, morally and physically for service in the U.S. Navy. Based on this, the producers were not allowed further access to the Academy grounds or provided with any other support for the filming. Navy personnel should avoid the appearance of support to the film as members of the Department of the Navy. Anyone attending a screening or promotional activity for the film should not attend in uniform.

Due to the lack of access to Annapolis Naval Academy, filming took place in Philadelphia, Pennsylvania at Girard College and at the decommissioned Philadelphia Naval Shipyard and at the Royal Naval College, Greenwich, UK. A similar film 23 years earlier The Lords of Discipline, was also filmed in the UK as no military academy in the US permitted filming due to considering that film's script also was substantially unlike the actual institutes.

== See also ==
- List of boxing films
