= Fieldhead =

British band

- Origin: Leeds, England
- Genres: Ambient, IDM, neo-classical, electronic
- Years active: 2008–present
- Labels: Gizeh Records; Home Assembly Music; Static Caravan Recordings; CSAF Records
- Members: Paul Elam; Elaine Reynolds; Sarah Kemp
- Website: www.fieldheadmusic.com

Fieldhead are a British band formed in Leeds, England, in 2008 and led by Paul Elam, a member of The Declining Winter. Paul currently resides in London, whilst violinists Elaine Reynolds and Sarah Kemp (both also of The Declining Winter) reside in Manchester and Newcastle upon Tyne respectively. Fieldhead's music is ambient/electronica in style, and is created using a combination of electronics and acoustic instruments.

Fieldhead have toured extensively in Europe and Canada, having performed with Tim Hecker, Machinefabriek, Grouper, Amiina and Jeniferever.

== Releases ==
Fieldhead self-released their debut EP "Introductions" in December 2008, and this was followed by the release of their debut album They Shook Hands for Hours on Home Assembly Music in November 2009.

In 2010, the band produced four releases: a split CD EP "Crest" with the Danish act Iris to Hypnos released in February 2010 on Static Caravan Recordings; a 10" vinyl record EP "Riser" released in July 2010 on Gizeh Records (featuring vocal contributions from Anna-Lynne Williams of Trespassers William, Chantal Acda, Anneke Kampman of Conquering Animal Sound, Elly May Irving of Glissando and Esker); a digital download live album Long Train Journeys released on Gizeh Records in November 2010; and a digital download single, "reference line", released on CSAF records in November 2010.

Fieldhead's second studio album, a correction, was released as an LP record by Gizeh Records on 22 October 2012.

Fieldhead's latest studio album, We've All Been Swimming, was released on Home Assembly Music on 30 June 2017.

== Discography ==
=== Studio albums ===
- They Shook Hands for Hours (2009)
- a correction (2012)
- We've All Been Swimming (2017)

=== Live albums ===
- Long Train Journeys (2010)

=== EPs ===
- Introductions (2008)
- Crest (2010)
- Riser (2010)
- 'Fury and Hecla' - split EP w. Loscil (2014)

=== Singles ===
- reference line (2010)
