= Strip (The Chameleons album) =

Studio album by the Chameleons
- Released: 1 May 2000
- Studio: Suite 16, Rochdale, England
- Label: Paradiso
- Producer: The Chameleons; Jonathan Barrett; Shan Hira

The Chameleons chronology
| Tony Fletcher Walked on Water.... La La La La La-La La-La-La (1990) | Strip (2000) | Why Call It Anything (2001) |

Strip is the first acoustic album by English rock band the Chameleons. It was released 1 May 2000 on record label Paradiso, following the band's reformation that year. It consists of acoustic arrangements of the Chameleons' previously released songs.

== Release ==
Strip was released 1 May 2000 on record label Paradiso.

== Critical reception ==
Professional ratings
Review scores
| Source | Rating |
|---|---|
| AllMusic | 3.5/5 stars |

AllMusic wrote that the album "[doesn't] so much retread its golden oldies for the umpteenth time as recast them completely as modern ideas".

== Track listing ==
All tracks are written by the Chameleons (Mark Burgess, Dave Fielding, Reg Smithies and John Lever).

| No. | Title | Length |
|---|---|---|
| 1. | "Less Than Human" | 4:01 |
| 2. | "Nathan's Phase" | 3:36 |
| 3. | "Here Today" | 4:46 |
| 4. | "Soul in Isolation" | 8:21 |
| 5. | "Pleasure and Pain" | 4:49 |
| 6. | "Paradiso" | 5:17 |
| 7. | "Caution" | 7:21 |
| 8. | "On the Beach" | 4:34 |
| 9. | "Road to San Remo" | 1:05 |
| 10. | "Indian" | 4:17 |

== Personnel ==
The Chameleons

- Mark Burgess – bass, vocals, 12-string guitar
- Reg Smithies – guitars, acoustic guitar, 12-string guitar, percussion
- Dave Fielding – acoustic guitar, 12-string guitar, harmonica, didgeridoo

Technical

- The Chameleons – production
- Mark Burgess – liner notes
- Jonathan Barrett – production, engineering
- Shan Hira – production, engineering
- Nimbus – mastering
- Reg Smithies – sleeve artwork
