= Two Sisters from Boston =

1946 film by Henry Koster

- movie poster
- Directed by: Henry Koster
- Written by: Myles Connolly
- Produced by: Joe Pasternak
- Starring: Kathryn Grayson; June Allyson; Lauritz Melchior; Jimmy Durante; Peter Lawford
- Cinematography: Robert Surtees
- Edited by: Douglass Biggs
- Music by: Charles Previn
- Production company: Metro-Goldwyn-Mayer
- Distributed by: Loew's Inc.
- Release date: April 1946
- Running time: 112 minutes
- Country: United States
- Language: English
- Budget: $2,223,000
- Box office: $4,461,000

Two Sisters from Boston is a 1946 American musical-comedy film directed by Henry Koster and starring Kathryn Grayson, June Allyson, Lauritz Melchior, Jimmy Durante and Peter Lawford. The film features songs by Sammy Fain and Ralph Freed.

== Plot ==
In the 1900s, Abigail, a young lady from Boston, leaves home to go to New York City for singing lessons in pursuit of her grand ambition to sing for the Metropolitan Opera. Unable to make ends meet, she takes a job singing in a Bowery beer hall without telling anyone from her family back home.

When a rumor gets back to Boston that Abigail is performing at a beer hall and showing her limbs, her family is shocked, and they decide that they must come to New York to investigate the rumor. Abigail then lies to her family and claims to sing in the Metropolitan Opera, not a beer hall. She even sneaks into a performance at the Met, persuading her family that she really is a singer there despite causing a mishap that interferes with Olaf Olstrom, the company's top tenor.

Martha, Abigail’s sister, eventually figures things out. She decides that she must help Abigail really get into the opera so that Abigail can leave her scandalous job at the beer hall. Along the way, Martha must cover for Abigail and protect the secret of her job at the beer hall. Martha meets a young man named Lawrence and begins a romance with him.

== Cast ==
- Kathryn Grayson as Abigail Chandler
- June Allyson as Martha Chandler
- Lauritz Melchior as Olstrom
- Jimmy Durante as Spike
- Peter Lawford as Lawrence Tyburt Patterson, Jr.
- Ben Blue as Wrigley
- Isobel Elsom as Aunt Jennifer
- Harry Hayden as Uncle Jonathan
- Thurston Hall as Mr. Lawrence Tyburt Patterson, Sr.
- Nella Walker as Mrs. Patterson
- Gino Corrado as Ossifish
- Byron Foulger as Recording Technician (uncredited)
- Lionel Braham as Opera Singer (uncredited)
- Adriana Caselotti as Opera Singer (uncredited)

== Songs ==
Music by Sammy Fain, lyrics by Ralph Freed.

- "There's Two Sides to Ev'ry Girl"
- "Nellie Martin"
- "The Firechief's Daughter"
- "G'Wan Home Your Mudder's Callin'"
- "Down by the Ocean"
- "After the Show"

What is never mentioned in reviews of this film is that the operatic aria duet sung at the climax of the film by Melchior and Grayson are actually the music of Mendelssohn's Violin Concerto to which English words have been very cleverly adapted.

== Reception ==
According to MGM records, the film was a hit, making $3,334,000 in the U.S. and Canada and $1,127,000 in other markets, leading to a profit of $605,000.

== Influence ==
The English post-punk band The Chameleons used a sample from the film as the introduction to the song "Don't Fall," the first song on their 1983 debut album Script of the Bridge. The scene features Lawrence Tyburt Patterson, Jr., Lawford's character, asking his mother, played by Nella Walker, about the age of his father. After she tells him that his father is younger than he looks and still 'spry,' Patterson, Jr. says "In his autumn, before the winter, comes man's last mad surge of youth." His mother quickly replies "What on earth are you talking about?" These two lines consist of the sample as used by the Chameleons. Patterson, Jr. goes on to say that he is quoting Sophocles, but the quote appears to be either apocryphal, misattributed by the screenwriters or else created by them originally. The Chameleons also used the same sample on an otherwise instrumental recording "Prisoners of the Sun."
