= Script of the Bridge =

Studio album by The Chameleons
- Released: 8 August 1983
- Studio: Cargo, Rochdale, England
- Genre: Post-punk; gothic rock
- Length: 57:07
- Label: Statik
- Producer: The Chameleons; Colin Richardson

The Chameleons chronology
Script of the Bridge (1983)	What Does Anything Mean? Basically (1985)

Singles from Script of the Bridge
- 1. "Up the Down Escalator" Released: 1 January 1983 (UK, Germany, Spain, US promo); 2. "Don't Fall" Released: 1 January 1983 (France promo); 3. "As High as You Can Go" Released: 1 February 1983 (UK, Portugal, Spain); 4. "A Person Isn't Safe Anywhere These Days" Released: 1 June 1983 (UK, Portugal)

Script of the Bridge is the debut studio album by the English rock band The Chameleons. It was released on 8 August 1983 by record label Statik.

Three singles were released from the album: "Up the Down Escalator", "As High as You Can Go" and "A Person Isn't Safe Anywhere These Days".

== Content ==
A sample of dialogue from the 1946 film Two Sisters from Boston was used as the introduction to the album's first track, "Don't Fall". According to the Chameleons' official website, "[the band] had a mic set up to a television and they recorded random bits, presumably for use in some songs".

=== Sound Inspirations ===
Andrew Welsh of Daily Record commented that the album is "characterised by subtly psychedelic Cure-like guitars and militaristic drum patterns reminiscent of Joy Division".

The album has also been described as gothic rock. However, frontman Mark Burgess said that "goth didn't even exist" when the album was released, describing the band as "definitely post-punk." He noted how guitarist Dave Fielding was a fan of Joni Mitchell and Mike Oldfield, while drummer John Lever favored Peter Gabriel and Genesis.

== Promotion ==
Three official singles and one promo single were released to promote the album. "Up the Down Escalator" was released as the album's first single in the UK, Germany and Spain on 1 January 1983 by the band's record label Statik. The band's US label, MCA Records, also issued it as a promotional single.

Statik issued "Don't Fall" as a promo-only single in France on 1 January 1983.

The album's second official UK single (also issued by Statik in Spain and Portugal) was "As High as You Can Go", released on 1 February. The third and final official single was "A Person Isn't Safe Anywhere These Days", released by Statik on 1 June in the UK and Portugal.

== Release ==
Script of the Bridge was released 8 August 1983 by record label Statik. The truncated US release on MCA Records, issued under the band name Chameleons U.K, omitted "Here Today", "Less Than Human", "Paper Tigers" and "View from a Hill".

The album was later released as a limited edition picture disc by Statik Records in 1985.

It was re-engineered and re-released in 2012 by Blue Apple Music.

== Reception ==
Professional ratings
Review scores
Source	Rating
AllMusic	4.5/5 stars
The Encyclopedia of Popular Music	3/5 stars
MusicHound Rock	5/5 stars
OndaRock	8/10
Record Collector	5/5 stars
Sounds	3.75/5 stars
Record Mirror	4/5 stars

Upon its release, Sounds wrote in their review: it is a "powerful and rich album whose strength is an intense muscular beat".

In his retrospective review, Ned Raggett of AllMusic praised the album, writing, "Script remains a high-water mark of what can generally be called post-punk music; an hour's worth of one amazing song after another", calling it "practically a greatest-hits record on its own". Chris Jenkins, in the book The Rough Guide to Rock, called the album "such an impressive record that The Chameleons would struggle to emulate it".

Trouser Press was slightly less favourable, writing that it "isn't a great album", but "has very appealing moments".

== Legacy ==
Andrew Welsh of Daily Record wrote that "echoes of the Chameleons' distinctive sound can still be heard today in bands as diverse as the Killers (but without the penchant for angst), Editors and even Pigeon Detectives." Neige, the leader of the French black metal band Alcest, said about the album, "the two guitars were very melodic and catchy, and most of the time playing different parts that work together harmoniously. You can hear the huge influence they had on bands like Interpol or Editors". Sweet Trip vocalist Valerie Cooper named the album as an inspiration for "[h]ow to appeal to your serene forlorn side you know you love to feel the loneliness."

"Up the Down Escalator" was featured in the 2024 film Lisa Frankenstein because it was a song that director Zelda Williams "always really liked".

German techno band Scooter recorded their own version of "Second Skin", featured in their 2009 record Under the Radar Over the Top.

== Track listing ==
All tracks are written by The Chameleons (Mark Burgess, Dave Fielding, Reginald Smithies, John Lever).

Side one
No.	Title	Length
1.	"Don't Fall"	4:06
2.	"Here Today"	3:50
3.	"Monkeyland"	5:24
4.	"Second Skin"	6:50
5.	"Up the Down Escalator"	3:57
6.	"Less Than Human"	4:12

Side two
No.	Title	Length
1.	"Pleasure and Pain"	5:11
2.	"Thursday's Child"	3:22
3.	"As High as You Can Go"	3:35
4.	"A Person Isn't Safe Anywhere These Days"	5:43
5.	"Paper Tigers"	4:16
6.	"View from a Hill"	6:41
Total length:		57:07

US MCA Records Version
No.	Title	Length
1.	"Up The Down Escalator (There Must Be Something Wrong Boys)"	3:56
2.	"As High As You Can Go"	3:33
3.	"Monkeyland"	5:14
4.	"A Person Isn't Safe Anywhere These Days"	5:40
5.	"Don't Fall"	4:03
6.	"Thursday's Child"	3:32
7.	"Pleasure And Pain"	5:08
8.	"Second Skin"	6:51
Total length:		37:57

== Personnel ==
The Chameleons

- Mark Burgess – bass, vocals
- Dave Fielding – lead guitar, keyboards
- Reg Smithies – rhythm guitar
- John Lever – drums, percussion

Technical

- The Chameleons – production
- Reg Smithies – album cover artwork
- Colin Richardson – production, engineering
