= Why Call It Anything =

Studio album by the Chameleons
- Released: 1 July 2001
- Recorded: September 2000 – May 2001
- Length: 56:33
- Label: Artful
- Producer: The Chameleons; David M. Allen

The Chameleons chronology
Strip (2000)	Why Call It Anything (2001)	This Never Ending Now (2002)

Professional ratings
Review scores
Source	Rating
AllMusic	4/5 stars
Q	3/5 stars

Why Call It Anything is the fourth studio album by English rock band the Chameleons. It was recorded from 2000 to 2001 and released 1 July 2001 on record label Artful. The album marked their first release of all-new material since the 1990 EP Tony Fletcher Walked on Water.... La La La La La-La La-La-La.

== Background ==
Why Call It Anything was recorded from September 2000 to May 2001 at Chapel Studios, Arc Studios and Woodbine Studios.

== Critical reception ==
The Encyclopedia of Popular Music wrote, "Why Call It Anything proved to be a stunning reaffirmation of the brilliance of this unsung band".

== Track listing ==
All lyrics are written by Mark Burgess, with additional lyrics by Kwasi Asante; all music is composed by the Chameleons (Burgess, Dave Fielding, John Lever and Reg Smithies).

No.	Title	Length
1.	"Shades"	4:56
2.	"Anyone Alive?"	5:36
3.	"Indiana"	5:22
4.	"Lufthansa"	5:58
5.	"Truth Isn't Truth Anymore"	6:20
6.	"All Around"	5:33
7.	"Dangerous Land"	5:53
8.	"Music in the Womb"	4:36
9.	"Miracles and Wonders"	9:13
10.	"Are You Still There?"	3:06

== Personnel ==
The Chameleons

- Mark Burgess – bass, lead vocals
- Reg Smithies – rhythm guitar, backing vocals
- Dave Fielding – lead guitar, keyboards, backing vocals
- John Lever – drums, backing vocals

Additional personnel

- Kwasi Asante – additional vocals, additional percussion

Technical

- The Chameleons – production
- David M. Allen – production, engineering, mixing
- John Rivers – engineering, mixing, mastering
- Ewan Davies – engineering
