= The Sun and the Moon (The Sun and the Moon album) =

Studio album by The Sun and the Moon
- Released: 1988
- Genre: Post-punk
- Label: Geffen
- Producer: CJ; The Sun and the Moon

The Sun and the Moon is the only studio album by English post-punk band the Sun and the Moon, featuring Mark Burgess and John Lever (both previously of the Chameleons), released in 1988 by record label Geffen.

== Reception ==
Professional ratings
Review scores
Source	Rating
AllMusic	4/5 stars
Trouser Press	(favourable)

Trouser Press called it "a very solid LP, if no challenge to the Chameleons' general brilliance (inventive guitarists Dave Fielding and Reg Smithies are greatly missed)", while AllMusic described it as "an intelligent, gripping concept album that easily outshines [The Chameleons'] body of work".

== Track listing ==
All tracks are written by The Sun and the Moon (Mark Burgess, Andy Clegg, John Lever and Andy Whitaker)

No.	Title	Length
1.	"The Speed of Life"	4:07
2.	"Death of Imagination"	3:49
3.	"A Matter of Conscience"	5:30
4.	"Peace in Our Time"	4:25
5.	"Dolphin"	4:20
6.	"House on Fire"	5:25
7.	"The Price of Grain"	6:06
8.	"Limbo-Land"	3:27
9.	"A Picture of England"	5:24
10.	"This Passionate Breed"	4:42

== Personnel ==
The Sun and the Moon

- Mark Burgess – bass, vocals
- Andy Clegg – guitars
- Andy Whitaker – guitars
- John Lever – drums, percussion

Additional personnel

- The Sun and the Moon – production, engineering, album art concept
- CJ – production, engineering
- Barry Diament – mastering
- Paul Cobbold – engineering
- George Marino – editing
- Jamie Maddox – sleeve photography
- Martin Kay – sleeve layout and design
- Mark Burgess – sleeve liner notes
- The Andrews Sisters – additional vocals
