= This Never Ending Now =

Studio album by the Chameleons
- Released: 1 September 2002
- Label: Paradiso
- Producer: The Chameleons; John Delf

The Chameleons chronology
Why Call It Anything (2001)	This Never Ending Now (2002)	Where Are You? (2024)

This Never Ending Now is the second acoustic album by English rock band the Chameleons. It was released on 1 September 2002 on record label Paradiso. It consists of acoustic reworkings of songs from their early albums and singles as well as featuring a cover of David Bowie's "Moonage Daydream".

== Release and reception ==
Professional ratings
Review scores
Source	Rating
AllMusic	4/5 stars
musicOMH	(favourable)
Stylus	B

This Never Ending Now was released on 1 September 2002 by record label Paradiso.

Ned Raggett of AllMusic called it "another lovely alternate visit into some of the band's strongest songs old and new". musicOMH was generally favourable, writing "while this is an essential purchase for any fan, it also makes a good introduction for the uninitiated."

== Track listing ==
All lyrics are written by Mark Burgess; all music is composed by the Chameleons (Burgess, Dave Fielding, John Lever and Reg Smithies), except as noted.

No.	Title	Writer(s)	Length
1.	"The Fan and the Bellows"		3:32
2.	"Tears"		5:37
3.	"Intrigue in Tangiers"		5:27
4.	"Is It Any Wonder?"		5:17
5.	"Seriocity"		3:13
6.	"Swamp Thing"		5:24
7.	"All Around"		4:10
8.	"Second Skin"		7:48
9.	"Home Is Where the Heart Is"		5:05
10.	"Miracles and Wonders"	The Chameleons, Kwasi Asante	5:02
11.	"View from a Hill"		7:01
12.	"Moonage Daydream" (David Bowie cover)	Bowie	5:56

== Personnel ==
The Chameleons

- Mark Burgess – bass, lead vocals, additional guitars
- Dave Fielding – lead guitar, keyboards, harmonica, backing vocals
- Reg Smithies – rhythm guitar, backing vocals
- John Lever – drums, percussion

Additional personnel

- Kwasi Asante – additional vocals
- Natalie – backing vocals

Technical

- Mark Burgess – production, liner notes
- Dave Fielding – production
- John Delf – production, engineering, mixing
