= Trespassers William =

American indie rock band

- Origin: Orange County, California, U.S.
- Genres: Indie rock; Dream pop; Shoegazing
- Years active: 1997–2012, 2020
- Labels: Nettwerk Records; Bella Union
- Members: Matt Brown; Anna-Lynne Williams
- Past members: Josh Gordon; Jeff McCullough; Trinidad Sanchez III; Ross Simonini; Nathan Skolrud; Jamie Williams
- Website: http://www.trespasserswilliam.com

Trespassers William was an American indie rock band formed in 1997 from Orange County, California. The band released three albums from 1997 to 2006, relocating to the SoDo/Capitol Hill area of Seattle, Washington, before their third album Having. Trespassers William disbanded in 2012, reuniting in 2020 for the release of a non-album single.

The band underwent numerous lineup changes, never retaining the same roster for more than one album. Trespassers William most recently consisted of vocalist Anna-Lynne Williams and guitarist/keyboardist Matt Brown as a duo. Williams releases solo material under the moniker Lotte Kestner.

== History ==
Formed in Orange County, California in 1997, Trespassers William released four albums and two EPs. Their debut album Anchor (1999) appeared on Sonikwire Records and is now out of print. It features a more alternative country and dream pop sound.

Different Stars was self-released in 2002 and was re-released twice—most recently on Nettwerk Records on October 19, 2004. The self-released version of Different Stars caught the attention of former Cocteau Twins member Simon Raymonde, who signed Trespassers William to his Bella Union record label.

In early 2004, the band moved to Seattle, leaving behind drummer Jamie Williams, who did not want to make the move with the band. Their third album, Having, (mixed by The Flaming Lips producer Dave Fridmann) was released on February 28, 2006. In February 2007, American webzine Somewhere Cold voted Having No. 10 on their 2006 Somewhere Cold Awards Hall of Fame.

The band toured the United States and Europe several times, including a UK tour with Damien Rice and a festival appearance in Spain with Morrissey. The band's music attracted modest press coverage and exposure, most notably in British magazines such as NME and Uncut and was featured on such television shows as One Tree Hill, The O.C., Buffy the Vampire Slayer, Felicity, and movies such as A Love Song for Bobby Long and Annapolis. Trespassers William also opened for The Chameleons lead singer Mark Burgess, Lisa Germano, Stereolab and James singer Tim Booth. Williams provided guest vocals for The Chemical Brothers' 2005 song "Hold Tight London" and Black Swan Lane's 2007 song "Fakers".

Brown and Williams turned Trespassers William into a duo by 2009 as "the constants in the history of the band." Williams would later admit that she felt the constant lineup changes "weakened the band." After the release of The Natural Order of Things EP in 2009, the band entered a long period of silence and officially disbanded on January 1, 2012. Brown and Williams began writing music in their Seattle apartment, but Williams came down with a case of tendonitis which worsened the pair's relationship.

A collection of B-sides and rarities called Cast, which also contains an expanded edition of their 2009 EP The Natural Order of Things, was released by Saint Marie Records on September 4, 2012. In 2017, Newsweek named Cast the fifteenth best double album since Prince's 1987 double album Sign o' The Times. Writing for Newsweek, Zach Schonfeld said that though Cast is "technically a rarities compilation, but in all its weird aching melancholy, it has the ebb and flow of a proper album."

In 2020, the band reunited to release the non-album single "Winterstorms".

== Band name origin ==
Trespassers William's name is from a Winnie-the-Pooh tale, "Pooh and Piglet Go Hunting and Nearly Catch a Woozle" by A.A. Milne:

Next to [Piglet's] house was a piece of broken board which had: "TRESPASSERS WILL" on it. When Christopher Robin asked Piglet what it meant, he said it was his grandfather's name, which was short for Trespassers William. And his grandfather had had two names in case he lost one — Trespassers after an uncle, and William after Trespassers.

== Influences ==
The band was influenced by The Smiths, Cocteau Twins, Red House Painters, Talk Talk, Sigur Rós, Kent, The Knife, Kate Bush and Radiohead.

== Discography ==
=== Albums ===
- Anchor (November 30, 1999)
- Different Stars (September 28, 2002)
- Having (February 28, 2006)

=== Singles and EPs ===
- "Vapour Trail" [Single] (2003)
- "Lie in the Sound" [Single] (2004)
- Live Session [EP] (2005)
- Noble House [EP] (2007)
- The Natural Order of Things [EP] (March 12, 2009)
- "Winterstorms" [Single] (April 24, 2020)
- "Hold" [Single] (recorded in 2011, officially released on May 13, 2022)

=== Compilations ===
- Cast (September 4, 2012)

=== Soundtrack appearances ===
- A Love Song for Bobby Long (Original Soundtrack) (2004)

5. "Different Stars"

- Music from the Television Series One Tree Hill, Volume 1 (2005)

14. "Lie In The Sound"

- Sweet Nothings: Love is a Mixtape (2006)

1. "And We Lean In"

== Personnel ==
=== Final lineup ===
- Matt Brown – guitar and keyboards (1997–2012, 2020)
- Anna-Lynne Williams – vocals and guitar (1997–2012, 2020)

=== Former members ===
- Josh Gordon – bass guitar, drums, percussion, guitar (1999–2001)
- Trinidad Sanchez III – bass guitar (2001–2004)
- Ross Simonini – bass guitar and keyboards (2002–2009)
- Nathan Skolrud – drums, bass guitar, and keyboards (2006–2009)
- Jamie Williams – drums (2001–2006)
