= Different Stars =

- Original 2002 American release

Studio album by Trespassers William
- Released: September 28, 2002; 2003; October 19, 2004
- Recorded: 2001–2003
- Genre: Dream pop; slowcore; shoegaze
- Length: 67:10 (2002); 61:39 (2004)
- Label: Sonik Wire; Bella Union; Nettwerk Records
- Producer: Trespassers William

Trespassers William chronology
Anchor (1999)	Different Stars (2002)	Having (2006)

Singles from Different Stars
- 1. "Vapour Trail" Released: 2003; 2. "Lie in the Sound" Released: 2004

Alternative cover
- Bella Union edition

Alternative cover
- Nettwerk edition

Different Stars is the second album by the American rock band Trespassers William. It was originally self-released in the United States on September 28, 2002, on the band's Sonik Wire label, released in the UK on Bella Union in 2003, and finally re-released in the United States with minor track changes on Nettwerk Records on October 19, 2004.

The album's second single, "Lie in the Sound", was used in three episodes of the television series One Tree Hill. It was featured on the One Tree Hill – Music from the WB Television Series, Vol. 1 soundtrack. The title track was used in the first season of The O.C. and "Fragment" was in the show Brothers & Sisters.

== Track listing ==
=== Self-released (2002) ===
All songs written by Anna-Lynne Williams, except as noted.

No.	Title	Writer(s)	Length
1.	"Intro"		1:17
2.	"Lie In the Sound"		5:43
3.	"Different Stars"		4:43
4.	"Alone"		5:02
5.	"Let You Down"	Matt Brown	4:58
6.	"Love Is Blindness"	Paul Hewson / Larry Mullen, Jr. / Adam Clayton / David Evans	6:59
7.	"Flicker"		5:28
8.	"Fragment"		6:25
9.	"Just Like This"		7:45
10.	"Love You More"		5:59
11.	"Untitled"		12:53

=== Bella Union version (2003) ===
No.	Title	Writer(s)	Length
1.	"Intro"		1:17
2.	"Lie In the Sound"		5:42
3.	"Different Stars"		4:43
4.	"Alone"		5:02
5.	"Let You Down"	Matt Brown	4:58
6.	"Vapour Trail"	Ride	4:55
7.	"Fragment"		6:24
8.	"Just Like This"		7:44
9.	"Love You More"		5:58
10.	"Untitled"		12:52

=== Nettwerk version (2004) ===
No.	Title	Writer(s)	Length
1.	"Intro"		1:17
2.	"Lie In the Sound"		5:42
3.	"Different Stars"		4:43
4.	"Alone"		5:00
5.	"Anchor"		5:57
6.	"Vapour Trail"	Ride	4:55
7.	"Fragment"		6:24
8.	"Love You More"		5:58
9.	"Untitled"		5:16
10.	"What Could I Say"		5:02
11.	"In a Song"		6:30
12.	"Different Stars (Live Session at KCRW)"		4:55

== Reception ==
Professional ratings
Review scores
Source	Rating
Allmusic	3.5/5 stars
Sputnikmusic	4.5/5 stars

Allmusic's MacKenzie Wilson gave Different Stars a three-and-a-half star review, praising the band's "hypnotic and lush soundscape" and drawing comparisons to The Sundays and Mazzy Star. Drowned in Sound listed the album on "The Beginner's Guide to Slowcore" and called it "a solitary trip through the fog, Anna-Lynne Williams sailing voice pushing over dark dream-pop waters, played only at fragile volumes and careful times." Adam Knott of Sputnikmusic significantly praised the album for the "quality of the songwriting and the allure of Williams' voice", noting how "2004 passed by without the mainstream or many at all knowing that Different Stars existed, and it's not wholly surprising; it's an album far too heavy and deliberate to listen to on a whim."

Scottish footballer Pat Nevin listed the album as one of his 13 favorite records.

== Personnel ==
=== Trespassers William ===
- Matt Brown – acoustic and electric guitar, artwork, engineer, keyboards
- Trinidad Sanchez III – bass guitar
- Justin Schier – keyboards
- Anna-Lynne Williams – vocals, acoustic guitar

=== Additional producers ===
- Kevin Bartley – mastering
- Elijah Thomson – mixing
