= The Mock Turtles =

English band

- Origin: Middleton, Greater Manchester, England
- Genres: Madchester, indie rock, baggy
- Years active: 1985–present
- Labels: Imaginary, Siren, Virgin

The Mock Turtles are an English indie rock band, formed in Middleton, Greater Manchester, in 1985, who enjoyed some success in the early 1990s. Their most famous song, "Can You Dig It?", which was released in the UK in 1991, charted at no. 18. When the song was re-released in slightly remixed form in 2003, it again reached the top 20 of the UK Singles Chart.

== Career ==
Led by former Judge Happiness singer Martin Coogan, elder brother of actor/comedian Steve Coogan, the band began to pick up attention around 1990, with debut album Turtle Soup and tracks such as "Lay Me Down" and "And Then She Smiles" on the Imaginary label. It was "Can You Dig It?", however, which gained them wider attention. Originally a B-side to "Lay Me Down", the band's new record label, Siren, re-issued it with additional guitar work, and "Can You Dig It?" breached the Top 20 in the UK Singles Chart. Their follow up single "And Then She Smiles" failed to replicate the success of the previous single, only reaching no. 44 in the chart.

In March 1991, the British music magazine NME reported that the band were appearing at the 'Great Indie Festival – A Midsummer's Day Dream' at Milton Keynes Bowl in June that year. Also on the bill were 808 State, Gary Clail, Shades of Rhythm, The Shamen, Paris Angels and Flowered Up.

The Mock Turtles, however, were unable to follow up the early success and were dropped by their label, three members briefly joining up as Ugli in the mid-1990s, remaining in limbo until Vodafone used "Can You Dig It?" for an advertising campaign in late 2002 and more famously in 2003. This saw the band make a comeback with Norman Cook doing a remix of the song, taking the track to no. 19 in the United Kingdom. Eight new tracks were included on a new Greatest Hits album, together with older songs from their early 1990s peak. Most recently, the track "And Then She Smiles" has been used as the theme song for the television programme Stella on Sky1.

Turtle Soup was reissued in 2017 with additional non-album singles and B-sides and covers.

== Current members ==
- Martin Coogan – vocals, guitar, percussion (1985–present)
- Martin Glyn Murray – guitar (1985–present)
- Andrew Stewardson – bass, viola, guitar (1989–present)
- Joanne Gent – keyboards, cello, guitar (1989–present)
- Steve Barnard – drums (1993–present)

== Former members ==
- Steve Cowen – drums (1985–93)
- Steve Green – bass (1985–89)
- Krzysztof Korab – keyboards (1985–89)

== Discography ==
=== Albums ===
- Turtle Soup (1990), Imaginary
- 87–90 (1991), Imaginary
- Two Sides (1991), Siren
- Can You Dig It – The Best of the Mock Turtles (2003), Virgin

=== Singles and EPs ===
- "Pomona" (1987), Imaginary
- "Wicker Man" (1989), Imaginary
- "And Then She Smiles" (1989), Imaginary
- "Lay Me Down" (1990), Imaginary
- Magic Boomerang EP (1990), Imaginary
- "Are You Experienced?" (1990), Imaginary
- "Can You Dig It?" (1991), Siren - UK no. 18
- And Then She Smiles EP (1991), Siren - UK no. 44
- "Strings and Flowers" (1991), Siren
- "Can You Dig It? (Fatboy Slim Remix)" (2003), Virgin - UK no. 19

=== Compilation appearances ===
- Beyond the Wildwood – A Tribute to Syd Barrett – "No Good Trying" (1987), Imaginary
- Fast 'n' Bulbous - A Tribute to Captain Beefheart – "Big Eyed Beans from Venus" (1988), Imaginary
- Shangri-La – A Tribute to the Kinks – "Shangri-La" / "Big Sky" (1989), Imaginary
- Time Between – A Tribute to the Byrds – "Time Between" / "Why" (1989), Imaginary
- Indie Top 20 Volume X – "Lay Me Down" (1990), Beechwood Music
- Ouch. Relativity Sampler – "Mary's Garden" (1991), Relativity
- Fifteen Minutes: A Tribute to the Velvet Underground – "Pale Blue Eyes" (1994)

Compilations that feature "Can You Dig It?" are:

- The Best Bands... Ever! Virgin/EMI, 2002
- Q: The Album Virgin/EMI/Universal, 2003
- I Luv Smash Hits Virgin/EMI, 2003
- Now That's What I Call Music! 54 Virgin/EMI, 2003
- The X-List Virgin/EMI, 2003
- Smash Hits Chart Summer 2003 Virgin/EMI, 2003
- EPIC Sony Music Entertainment UK, 2010
- 101 Indie Classics EMI TV, 2010
