= Can You Dig It? (The Mock Turtles song) =

1991 single by the Mock Turtles

Single by the Mock Turtles

from the album Turtle Soup
- B-side: "Lose Yourself"
- Released: 1991
- Genre: Indie dance; baggy; shoegaze
- Length: 3:59 (original); 4:11 (2003 remix)
- Label: Siren (original release); Virgin (re-release)
- Songwriter: Martin Coogan
- Producers: Martin Coogan; Pete Smith

The Mock Turtles singles chronology
"Are You Experienced?" (1990)	"Can You Dig It?" (1991)	"And Then She Smiles" (1991)

Music video
- "Can You Dig It?" on YouTube

"Can You Dig It?" is a song by English indie rock band the Mock Turtles, released as a single in 1991 from their debut album, Turtle Soup (1990). The song was originally the B-side to the single "Lay Me Down". It was released on Siren Records in all formats except for one of the seven-inch singles released in Europe where it was released by Virgin Records.

"Can You Dig It?" reached number 18 on the UK Singles Chart and number 12 in Ireland in 1991. In 2003, after the song was used in a 2002 Vodafone advertisement, it was remixed by Fatboy Slim and Simon Thornton and released again. The remix peaked at number 19 in the United Kingdom, number 34 in Ireland, number 40 in Greece and number 96 in the Netherlands.

The single was dedicated to Alan Duffy, noting "shine on you crazy diamond" on the CD single sleeve.

== Background ==
The name of the song came about after the Mock Turtles were asked for a name for a song for the B-side to "Lay Me Down" so that the sleeve art could be produced. Martin Coogan had been watching The Warriors, which featured the rallying call, "Can you dig it?". The name came first and then the band went off to write the song. Coogan told the NME that the song had been loosely based on the theme from a children's TV programme with ghosts and a pantomime horse.

"Can You Dig It?" was the band's first release on Siren Records, and features a re-recording of the song, the original having been released on Turtle Soup in 1990, and as the B-side to "Lay Me Down". The group's drummer, Roland Kerridge, played the song's drum pattern on the Simmons SDX, whose MIDI data was transferred into the Notator sequencing software. With help from engineer Simon Zagorski-Thomas, the kick drum and snare backbeat were quantized and then 'humanized' (a feature which "randomized the timing and velocity of the MIDI data within a given 'window'"), and while the hi-hat and drum fills went unedited, some of their MIDI data was copied and pasted to, as Zargoski-Thomas describes, "adjust the narrative dynamic shape of the overall performance", noting that the big drum fill at the end originally came earlier in the song.

The song reached number 18 on the UK Singles Chart, and earned the band appearances on BBC's Top of the Pops. Frontman Martin Coogan told an interviewer that the group knew they would "achieve a degree of success" with the song and "that it would open doors for the band. We're very much aware of the song's light pop status and we're very conscious of playing the system at its own game." He described their entrance into the top 20 as "a Trojan Horse situation", as the group's subsequent album, Two Sides, contains "deeper songs" with more "heavyweight" lyrics that contrast with the 'gimmickry' of "Can You Dig It?" and its follow-up, "And Then She Smiles". One week, both "Can You Dig It?" and the Railway Children's "Every Beat of the Heart" were tied at number 46 on the chart, then the highest placing for two tied singles since tied placings were made possible by a change in regulations at the start of 1991.

Some fans of the Mock Turtles were worried that releasing re-recordings of both "Can You Dig It?" and the follow-up, "And Then She Smiles", signalled a lack of new material from the group, concerns which Radio 1 DJ and Wales on Sunday contributor Simon Mayo says would be eased by the band's subsequent album, Two Sides, on which they are included. Coogan told Mayo that neither was the band's choice of singles; instead, they were recorded and released as they had no new material following their signing with Siren. "So the record company suggested re-doing 'Can You Dig It?'. Then we needed a follow-up. Only 'Smiles' was properly finished or suitable."

== Remix ==
Vodafone began to use the song in its UK television advertisements for Vodafone Live! in 2002, raising the song's profile. Fatboy Slim and Simon Thornton remixed the song for a single release by Virgin Records. Issued on 3 March 2003 as a CD and cassette single, the remix peaked at number 19 on the UK Singles Chart. Following the remix's release, Vodafone subsequently started using the remixed version of the song on their adverts thereafter. This remix coincided with the release of Virgin's Can You Dig It?: The Best of the Mock Turtles, to which this new remix was the sole single released to promote it. Steve Woof, head of EMI's range marketing, commented that after Vodafone licensed the song, it gave the label "the perfect reason" to create a mid-price Best of the Mock Turtles compilation album. He told Music Week that "when the ad finishes and the sales start to taper off, we'll probably drop it down to budget level."

== Critical reception ==
The Gavin Report critic Linda Ryan, in her 1990 review of Turtle Soup, wrote that the song was one of several on the album which "could be radio smashes if given a chance. Somebody pick these guys, up, quick!" Reviewing the 1991 single, Sounds critic Tim Peacock called it "another well-established pop gemstone" which had "lost little in translation" through being re-recorded. He praised Coogan's "confident throat histrionics presiding over this assured cruise", but questioned the delay of any new material from the group. Record Mirror singles reviewer Robin Smith described it as "near perfect pop with chunky chords and a kiss of a chorus to hum all the way home. Buy it or take the next train to Squaresville." However, Andrew Smith of Melody Maker described the song as "glossy and smooth, abysmally balanced and inoffensive. Boring as sin, in other words."

Also of Record Mirror, features writer Johnny Dee referred to it as "a re-recorded big fave from Turtle Soup", adding: "Staying true to their pop heritage (The Monkees etc), the record gently introduces a larger listenership to a band that's been 'beavering away while the hype has been going on all around'." In a review of the Two Sides album, Keith Cameron of Vox wrote: "The chart smash 'Can You Dig It?' proved the Turtles well capable of knocking out murderously infectious doggerel for a nation of baggies to swing their pants to". In his review of the same album, Q critic Robert Sandall praised it as "the best rock single of the year", describing it as a "entrancingly tuneful, head-to-toe tapper".

In July 1992, Adam Sweeting of The Guardian wrote that the song "promised much in a Radio One friendly kind of way", but believed it was not aptly followed upon. In 1999, Manchester Evening News called it an "infectiously catchy" single. Writing in 2003, British columnist James Masterton commented that the song was "[t]he fruits of a long touring career" which began in the mid-1980s and said it is "right up there with Ride's 'Twisterella' as the closest the early 90s 'baggy' sound ever got to pure pop, a shoegazing hit that it was possible to get drunk and stupid to – especially when the guitar solo kicked in." He noted that, peaking at number 18, it was "actually a smaller hit than most people remember", adding that the Vodafone-inspired 2003 re-release did not rectify the situation "as the track can do little more than creep into the Top 20, landing just one place behind its original 1991 peak. Still if nothing else it is a joy to see what has been for too long an unlauded classic back in the charts."

== Track listings ==
- 7-inch and cassette single (1991)
1. "Can You Dig It?" – 3:59
2. "Lose Yourself" – 3:43
- 12-inch single (1991)

A1. "Can You Dig It?" (extended mix) – 5:55
B1. "Lose Yourself" – 3:43
B2. "Lay Me Down" (live) – 6:43

- UK CD single (1991)
1. "Can You Dig It?" – 3:59
2. "Can You Dig It?" (extended mix) – 5:55
3. "Lose Yourself" – 3:43
4. "Lay Me Down" (live) – 6:43
- UK and European CD single (2003)
1. "Can You Dig It?" (Fatboy Slim and Simon Thornton 2003 remix radio edit) – 3:53
2. "Can You Dig It?" (original version) – 4:07
3. "Can You Dig It?" (Fatboy Slim and Simon Thornton 2003 remix) – 4:11
4. "Can You Dig It?" (Fatboy Slim and Simon Thornton 2003 remix instrumental) – 4:11

== Charts ==
=== Original version ===
Chart (1991)	Peak position
Europe (Eurochart Hot 100)	57
Europe (European Hit Radio)	25
Ireland (IRMA)	12
UK Singles (OCC)	18
UK Airplay (Music Week)	10
US Modern Rock Tracks (Billboard)	19

=== 2003 remix ===
Chart (2003)	Peak position
Europe (Eurochart Hot 100)	65
Greece (IFPI)	40
Ireland (IRMA)	34
Netherlands (Single Top 100)	96
Scotland Singles (OCC)	17
UK Singles (OCC)	19

== Legacy ==
"Can You Dig It?" is the theme song of SSE Airtricity League Live on RTÉ. In 2012, the song was used by online casino Gala Bingo in an advertisement.
