= What Does Anything Mean? Basically =

Studio album by The Chameleons
- Released: 20 May 1985
- Recorded: January 1985
- Studio: Highland, Inverness, Scotland
- Genre: Post-punk, gothic rock
- Length: 41:34
- Label: Statik
- Producer: The Chameleons; Colin Richardson

The Chameleons chronology
Script of the Bridge (1983)	What Does Anything Mean? Basically (1985)	Strange Times (1986)

Singles from What Does Anything Mean? Basically
- 1. "Singing Rule Britannia (While the Walls Close In)" Released: 1 August 1985

What Does Anything Mean? Basically is the second studio album by the English rock band The Chameleons. It was recorded in January 1985 and released on 20 May 1985 by record label Statik.

One single was released from the album: "Singing Rule Britannia (While the Walls Close In)".

== Recording ==
What Does Anything Mean? Basically was recorded in January 1985 at Highland Studios in Inverness, Scotland.

== Release ==
The album's sole single, "Singing Rule Britannia (While the Walls Close In)", was released on 1 August 1985. This song used uncredited Lennon-McCartney lyrics, with the final passage of the song quoting key lyrics of the Beatles song "She Said, She Said".

What Does Anything Mean? Basically was released 20 May 1985 on record label Statik.

== Critical reception ==
Professional ratings
Review scores
Source	Rating
AllMusic	4.5/5 stars
Encyclopedia of Popular Music	4/5 stars
MusicHound Rock	4/5 stars
OndaRock	7/10

What Does Anything Mean? Basically has been generally well received by critics.

In his retrospective review, Ned Raggett of AllMusic called it "[a] rarity of sophomore albums, something that at once made the band all the more unique in its sound while avoiding a repetition of earlier work. [...] an astounding record." Trouser Press called it "even better" than Script of the Bridge, "with much stronger production underscoring both the band's direct power and the ghostly atmospherics of its icy church keyboards and delay-ridden guitars".

Chris Jenkins, in the book The Rough Guide to Rock, however, called it "as half-baked as its title".

== Track listing ==
All lyrics are written by Mark Burgess; all music is composed by The Chameleons (Burgess, Dave Fielding, Reg Smithies and John Lever).

Side one
No.	Title	Length
1.	"Silence, Sea and Sky"	1:59
2.	"Perfume Garden"	4:36
3.	"Intrigue in Tangiers"	5:17
4.	"Return of the Roughnecks"	3:26
5.	"Singing Rule Britannia (While the Walls Close In)"	4:17

Side two
No.	Title	Length
1.	"On the Beach"	4:10
2.	"Looking Inwardly"	4:29
3.	"One Flesh"	4:28
4.	"Home Is Where the Heart Is"	4:54
5.	"P.S. Goodbye"	4:02

CD bonus tracks
No.	Title	Length
11.	"In Shreds"	4:03
12.	"Nostalgia"	5:23

== Personnel ==
The Chameleons

- Mark Burgess – bass, vocals, strings
- Dave Fielding – lead guitar, ARP String Ensemble
- Reg Smithies – rhythm guitar, acoustic guitar
- John Lever – drums

Technical

- The Chameleons – production
- Colin Richardson – production
- Reg Smithies – album cover illustration, production
- Ian Caple – engineering
- Martin Kay – sleeve design
