= Strange Times (The Chameleons album) =

Studio album by the Chameleons
- Released: 1 September 1986
- Recorded: 1986
- Studio: Jacob's Studio, (Ridgeway House, Farnham), Surrey, England
- Genre: Post-punk; dream pop
- Length: 52:09
- Label: Geffen
- Producer: David M. Allen

The Chameleons chronology
What Does Anything Mean? Basically (1985)	Strange Times (1986)	Tony Fletcher Walked on Water.... La La La La La-La La-La-La (1990)

Singles from Strange Times
- 1. "Tears" Released: 16 June 1986; 2. "Swamp Thing" Released: 1 September 1986

Strange Times is the third studio album by the English rock band the Chameleons. It was released on 1 September 1986 in the United Kingdom, and on 29 September 1986 in the United States, by Geffen Records. Initial copies of the North American vinyl release included a bonus LP featuring six non-album tracks, which would later be included as bonus tracks on the CD release in 1993. Two singles were released from the album: "Tears" and "Swamp Thing".

Strange Times was met with largely positive reviews, with Post-Punk.com calling the album one of 100 essential dream pop releases and stating, "the Manchester quartet's third record is arguably their dreamiest, trading in much of their early angst while swinging for the fences with a tremendous collection of songs."

Strange Times and the follow-up EP Tony Fletcher Walked on Water (recorded in 1987 and released in 1990) would be the band's final studio releases for nearly 15 years, as tensions within the group caused a breakup that saw the band members pursue other projects.

== Recording ==
According to Chameleons frontman Mark Burgess, "The album was recorded at Jacob's Studio in Surrey, south of London over a period of five weeks. Again the material was only loosely sketched and we didn't really have any idea how the album would turn out. We'd spent a month or so getting the ideas together living in a small house in the Lake District of England and rehearsing the ideas in a school hall, specially hired, just outside the village of Hawkshead."

== Release ==
The first single from the album was "Tears", released on 16 June 1986. The album version (credited as the "original arrangement") differs from the single version (credited as "full arrangement"); the original arrangement is an acoustic version with a different ending, while the full arrangement is electric. The single included the B-sides "Paradiso" and "Inside Out".

Strange Times was released 1 September 1986 on the Geffen label. Initial American pressings of the record came with a bonus 12" with six additional tracks, two of which are covers. The American cassette also had the same bonus tracks, split up so that each side of the cassette contained half of the bonus tracks. The record did not have a "B" side; it was credited as 'Side A' and 'Side A+'.

The album was never released on CD in any territory until 1993. Although Geffen released it as a two-disc set with all of the bonus tracks in the UK and Germany, the decision was made to omit one of the bonus tracks ("Ever After") from the American version to facilitate its release on a single disc.

The album's second single, "Swamp Thing", was released on the same day as the album. The formats of the single included a cover of David Bowie's "John, I'm Only Dancing" as the B-side.

A promotional-only 12" vinyl single was also issued in 1986, featuring album opener "Mad Jack" on the A-side and "Time/The End of Time" and the band's cover of the Beatles' "Tomorrow Never Knows" on the B-side.

== Reception ==
Professional ratings
Review scores
Source	Rating
AllMusic	4.5/5 stars
The Encyclopedia of Popular Music	4/5 stars
MusicHound Rock	4.5/5 stars

Strange Times was praised by the critics who reviewed it. Ian Gittins of Melody Maker called it "a marvellous departure" from their previous work and "a wonderful record." Robert Palmer of The New York Times described it as "the band's most inventive and winning album yet and as a fine a record as any pop-rock guitar band has made this year. [...] it should delight just about anyone."

== Legacy and influence ==
Burgess later said, "Strange Times is my favourite. Personally, I believe it was the best lyrical work I'd done with the band and some of the best vocal performances, and I think the Chameleons really began to mature and move forward with this album."

The album was included on an unranked list of 100 essential dream pop releases on independent music website Post-Punk.com in 2018.

In a post on his Instagram account on 22 March 2018, Oasis guitarist Noel Gallagher cited Strange Times as an early influence on his songwriting: "...I'd forgotten how much this album meant to me. It came out in '86. I was 19!! I've been listening to it every day since and I have to say it's blown my mind...again! It must have influenced my early years as a song writer because I can hear ME in it everywhere!!..."

== Track listing ==
All tracks are written by the Chameleons (Mark Burgess, Dave Fielding, Reg Smithies and John Lever), except where noted.

Side A
No.	Title	Length
1.	"Mad Jack"	3:55
2.	"Caution"	7:46
3.	"Tears" (Original Arrangement)	5:05
4.	"Soul in Isolation"	7:28

Side A+
No.	Title	Length
5.	"Swamp Thing"	5:56
6.	"Time/The End of Time"	5:41
7.	"Seriocity"	3:00
8.	"In Answer"	4:54
9.	"Childhood"	4:39
10.	"I'll Remember"	3:39

CD bonus tracks
No.	Title	Writer(s)	Length
11.	"Tears" (Full Arrangement)		5:09
12.	"Paradiso"		4:35
13.	"Inside Out"		3:34
14.	"Ever After"		3:59
15.	"John, I'm Only Dancing" (David Bowie cover)	Bowie	2:30
16.	"Tomorrow Never Knows" (The Beatles cover)	John Lennon; Paul McCartney	6:08

== Personnel ==
The Chameleons

- Mark "Birdy" Burgess – bass, vocals
- Dave Fielding – lead guitar, ARP String Ensemble
- Reg Smithies – rhythm guitar
- John Lever – drums, percussion

Technical

- David M. Allen – production
- Mark Saunders – engineering
- Paul Crocket – engineering assistance, piano
- Beki Field – engineering assistance, piano
- Reg Smithies – cover illustration

== Release history ==
Country	Date	Label	Format
United Kingdom & Europe	1 September 1986	Geffen Records	LP
North America	29 September 1986	Geffen Records	LP with bonus album
United Kingdom & Europe	July 1993	Geffen Records	2CD
North America	July 1993	Geffen Records	CD with bonus tracks
Japan	25 February 2004	Geffen Records	CD with bonus tracks
Europe	20 March 2020	Music on CD	2CD
United Kingdom	28 October 2022	Moochin' About	2LP reissue (coloured vinyl)
United Kingdom	3 May 2024	Blue Apple Music	Remastered 2CD
United Kingdom	3 May 2024	Blue Apple Music	Remastered 3LP
United Kingdom	3 May 2024	Blue Apple Music	Remastered 3LP (coloured vinyl)
