= The Witchwood =

Pub in Ashton-Under-Lyne, Greater Manchester, England

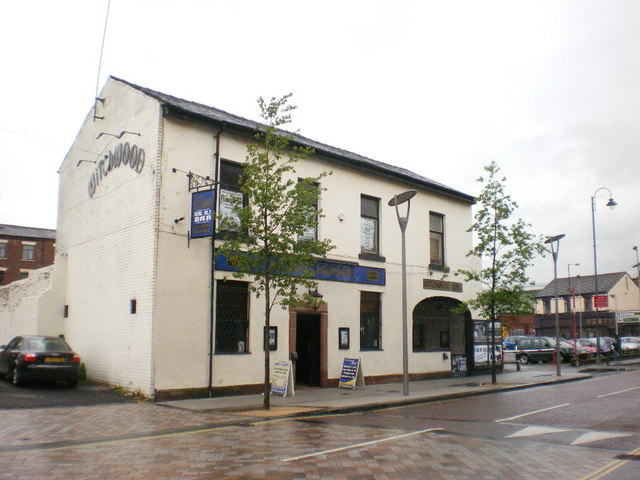
- The pub in 2009

General information
- Type: Public house
- Location: 152 Old Street, Ashton-under-Lyne, Greater Manchester, England
- Coordinates: 53°29′12″N 2°5′55″W
- Renovated: 1960s
- Owner: Inventive Leisure

Website
- thewitchwood.co.uk

The Witchwood is a public house and live music venue on Old Street in Ashton-under-Lyne, a town in the Metropolitan Borough of Tameside, Greater Manchester, England. Located in the town centre, The Witchwood has been a hub for live indie and rock music since the 1960s, and features on North West England's pub music circuit.

Previous performers at The Witchwood include Oasis, Badly Drawn Boy, The Coral, Snow Patrol, The Seahorses, James, Ash, The Fall, Lostprophets, Muse, Opeth, The Damned, Shuan Ryder, Glenn Tilbrook, the Hamsters and The Ordinary Boys.

In 2004, Tameside Metropolitan Borough Council served a compulsory purchase order on The Witchwood, as plans for the regeneration of the surrounding area required the building to be demolished. After a campaign to save the venue, supported by local musicians and businesses, and live music fans from across the country, Ask Developments agreed that The Witchwood would stay, on condition that "the exterior would be re-rendered and new windows put in". The campaign to save The Witchwood was led by Tom Hingley and supported by musicians such as Bert Jansch, the Fall, and The Chameleons.
