= Cud (band) =

British indie rock band

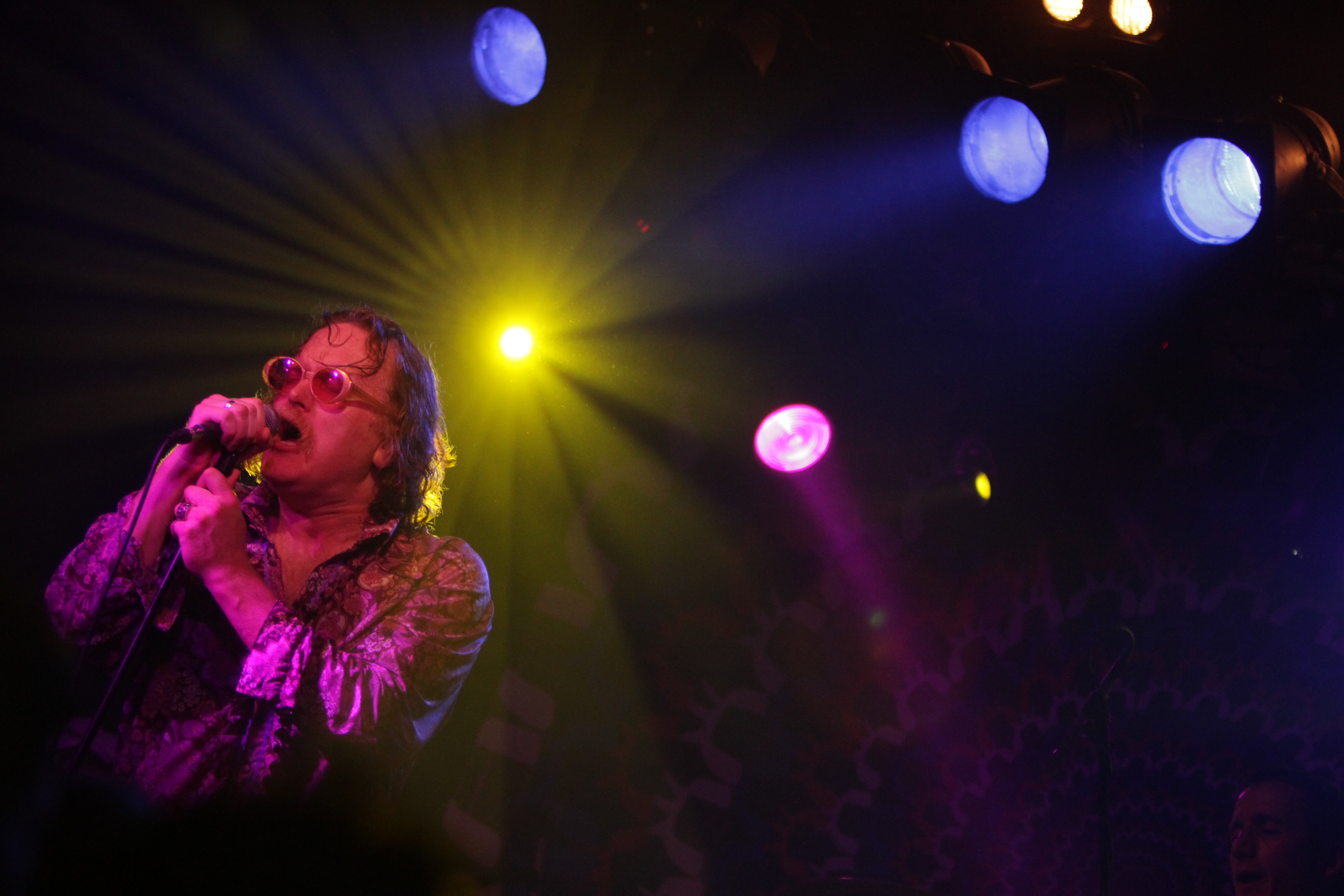
- Cud performing live in 2012

Background information
- Origin: Leeds, England
- Genres: Indie rock, Britpop
- Years active: 1987–1995, 2006–present
- Labels: Reception Records (1987–88); Imaginary (1988 –91); A&M (1991–95)
- Members: Carl Puttnam; Mike Dunphy; William Potter; Gogs Byrn
- Past members: Mickey Dale; Felix Frey; Steve Goodwin
- Website: cudband.com

Cud are an English indie rock band formed in Leeds in 1986. The original line-up included vocalist Carl Puttnam, guitarist/keyboardist Mike Dunphy, bassist William Potter and drummer Steve Goodwin.

In June 1987, they recorded a Peel Session and the band signed with Reception Records who released their first single "Mind the Gap.” Two further 12" EPs followed in 1988 on Nightshift and Ediesta Records. Following extensive touring and positive press the band signed to Imaginary Records in 1989. Following three albums (one of which Elvis Belt was a compilation of previously released singles) on Imaginary the band signed with A&M Records in 1991. Although three singles broke into the UK top 40 and they released two further LPs the band's fortunes declined and the band broke up in early 1995.

The band reformed in 2006 to support the release of a greatest hits album with Felix Frey replacing Dunphy on guitar. When guitarist Mike Dunphy later rejoined, drummer Steve Goodwin decided to stop touring and was replaced by Gogs Byrn. The band continue to tour and attend indie rock festivals such as the Shiiine On weekender, and completed a co-headlining tour with The Boo Radleys in October 2023. They toured in 2024 and 2025, including an all day ‘mini festival’ in Whitby featuring Miles Hunt and Ultrasound, entitled ‘Only a day in Whitby’. A repeat of the event is scheduled for two days in October 2026, with guest artists including The Wedding Present and The Primitives. This will form part of a 40th Anniversary tour in Autumn 2026.

== History ==
The four-piece formed in Leeds in 1986/87, with . Their first recording was a Peel Session in June 1987, prompted by a demo tape they sent to John Peel. Their first single, "Mind the Gap", was released on the Wedding Present's Reception Records record label. Their second release, the Peel Sessions EP, was released on Strange Fruit Records in February 1988 - this included a cover version of Hot Chocolate's "You Sexy Thing" which had already featured in the Festive 50 at number 20. After building up a strong local fan base, they were signed by Imaginary Records in 1989, who released their albums, When in Rome, Kill Me and Leggy Mambo.

Cud signed to A&M Records in 1991. The greater spending power at A&M enabled Cud to reach the top 40 in 1992, with "Rich and Strange" (#24) and "Purple Love Balloon" (#27), as well as reaching number 30 on the UK Albums Chart with fourth album Asquarius. The band were labelled with the proto-Britpop genre label "Lion Pop", though at the time the NME did not further construct a scene around that term meaning that Cud would miss out on the Britpop fame of the mid-'90s. Nevertheless, a further top 40 single followed in 1994 with "Neurotica", whilst their last album Showbiz would chart at number 46 on the UK Albums Chart in April 1994. Potter was replaced by Mick Dale, who would later join Embrace, shortly before the band broke up in early 1995. They recorded a number of tracks with Dale, (who had played keyboards on earlier Cud releases) although none were commercially released and he did not feature in any live performances at that time. He has however occasionally joined the band for live performances throughout 2015-2019.

On 21 November 2001, Puttnam returned to the music scene with the mail order only release Donkey With a Fez On, an album of previously unreleased demo material originally intended for release after the Showbiz album. This was followed by a live performance at the 12 Bar Club in London. Puttnam was accompanied by Alaric Neville and David Lazenby on guitars and Michael Hurst on melodeon and percussion. The performance was subsequently released on CD in 2002 as the mail order only Chateau de Carles.

Cud reformed to support the release of a double album of their greatest hits entitled Rich and Strange - The Anthology which was released in August 2006 on Universal Records, alongside a brief UK tour to promote it. Dunphy was replaced by Felix Frey on guitar for the tour. The same line-up again reformed for a short tour early in 2008 to support the expanded re-releases of Elvis Belt (now a double album entitled Elvis Belt/Elvis Handbag), Leggy Mambo and Showbiz. At Cud's gig at the Barfly in Liverpool on 6 March 2008 Puttnam suggested, contrary to suggestions on Cud's homepage, that the latest tour would be Cud's last. On 27 April 2008, Cud announced that their final ever gig (entitled "No more Cud!") would take place in Rios Leeds on 3 May 2008. To commemorate the event, a limited-edition CD single was sold, which was supposed to feature a new recording of "Punishment-Reward Relationship", along with live versions of "Now!", "Only", "Living in the Past" and "Strange Kind of Love". This was distributed as a blank printed CDR with the tracks to follow shortly afterwards. To date the songs have not been forthcoming.

Cud reformed again (with Puttnam, Goodwin, Potter & Frey once again) for two gigs during March 2010, held at the Hootananny Club in London. In 2012 the band did their "Jubilee tour" in support of their album The Complete BBC Sessions released by 3Loop Music. This tour was their first since 2010, and the first to include original guitarist Mike Dunphy in almost 17 years. However, original drummer Steve Goodwin declined to participate so Gogs Byrn completed the line-up. During the tour the band performed live on Marc Riley's BBC 6 Music Show. The band played further shows later in the year with The Wedding Present, Carter USM & Ned's Atomic Dustbin including a sell-out show at Brixton Academy.

In 2013, Steve Lamacq premiered Cud's first new single in 17 years; a double-A side titled "Louise" / "Mexico". The band toured in November 2013 together with Ned's Atomic Dustbin. With the release of the single "Victoria" in 2014, Cud performed several support gigs across the UK in October. In 2015, the band played several dates in the UK in September, and appeared at the 'Shiiine On Weekender' in Minehead on 8 November. They have also appeared at the 'Gigantic' indie music festival in Manchester in April 2014 and 2016. That year Puttnam and Dunphy, performing 'alternative' versions of Cud songs under the name 'Carefree Sud' played a series of shows including the Beautiful Days festival. This offshoot also featured as support band to Cud themselves at The Belgrave Music Hall in Leeds. The band appeared at the 'Shiiine On Weekender' in November 2016, 2017 and 2018. They also completed a tour throughout 2017 where they played a set consisting of all of their 20 single releases. This was followed in 2018 by a seven-date tour entitled 'Just The Good Ones'. The set list for these shows was determined by a Facebook poll where followers were asked to vote for their ten favourite live CUD songs. The band announced in December 2014, that 2015 would be the year of the new album release. As yet, this material is yet to surface.

On 9 September 2021, Cud released a new single entitled "Switched On". A further single “Sorry (I let you down)” was released in October 2022. Cud released a track named "Saturday", the first single in four years, in October 2026. The band continue to perform live, touring with co-headliners The Boo Radleys in 2023.

== Discography ==
=== UK albums ===
Release date	Album details
12 June 1989	When in Rome, Kill Me: Label: Imaginary Records
18 June 1990	Elvis Belt: Label: Imaginary Records
22 October 1990	Leggy Mambo: Label: Imaginary Records
29 June 1992	Asquarius: Label: A&M Records; UK #30
11 April 1994	Showbiz: Label: A&M Records; UK #46
7 August 2006	Rich and Strange - The Anthology: Label: Universal Music Catalogue
6 August 2012	The Complete BBC Sessions: Label: 3 Loop Music

=== UK singles ===
1. "Mind the Gap" (Reception 1987)
2. "The Peel Sessions: Cud" (UK Strange Fruit 1988)
3. "Under My Hat" (UK Ediesta 1988)
4. "Slack Time" (UK Dug/Nightshift 1988)
5. "Lola" (UK Imaginary MIRAGE 1989)
6. "Only (A Prawn in Whitby)" (Imaginary MIRAGE 1989)
7. "Hey! Wire" (UK Imaginary MIRAGE 1990)
8. "Robinson Crusoe" (UK Imaginary MIRAGE 1990)
9. "Backdoor Santa" (fanclub flexi-disc 1990)
10. "Magic" (UK Imaginary MIRAGE 1991)
11. "Oh No Won't Do" (UK A&M 1991)
12. "Through the Roof" (UK A&M 1992)
13. "Rich and Strange" (UK A&M 1992)
14. "Purple Love Balloon" (UK A&M 1992)
15. "Once Again" (UK A&M 1992)
16. "Cud's Ode to Christmas Joy" (fanclub flexi-disc 1992)
17. "Neurotica" (UK A&M 1994)
18. "Sticks and Stones" (UK A&M (1994)
19. "One Giant Love" (UK A&M 1994)
20. "Louise" / "Mexico" (UK Tonka 2013)
21. "Victoria" (UK Tonka 2015)
22. "Switched On" (UK Tonka 2021)
23. "Sorry I Let You Down" (UK Tonka 2022)

=== UK singles chart history ===
Year	Single	Peak chart positions	Album
Year	Single	UK	Album
October 1990	"Robinson Crusoe"	86	Leggy Mambo
March 1991	"Magic"	80	Leggy Mambo
October 1991	"Oh No Won't Do"	49	
March 1992	"Through The Roof"	44	Asquarius
May 1992	"Rich & Strange"	24	Asquarius
August 1992	"Purple Love Balloon"	27	
October 1992	"Once Again"	45	Asquarius
February 1994	"Neurotica"	37	Showbiz
April 1994	"Sticks and Stones"	68	Showbiz
September 1994	"One Giant Love"	52	Showbiz
