= Fast 'n' Bulbous – A Tribute to Captain Beefheart =

Fast 'n' Bulbous - A Tribute To Captain Beefheart

Compilation album by Various artists
- Released: 1988
- Label: Imaginary Records

Fast 'n' Bulbous – A Tribute to Captain Beefheart is an album released by Imaginary Records in the UK in 1988, consisting of contemporary artists performing cover versions of songs by Captain Beefheart.

== Track listing ==
1. Dog Faced Hermans - "Zig Zag Wanderer"
2. XTC - "Ella Guru"
3. The Scientists - "Clear Spot"
4. The Membranes - "Ice Cream for Crow"
5. The King of Luxembourg - "Long Necked Bottles"
6. The Beat Poets - "Sun Zoom Spark"
7. That Petrol Emotion - "Hot Head"
8. Primevals - "China Pig"
9. Sonic Youth - "Electricity"
10. Good and Gone - "Harry Irene"
11. The Screaming Dizbusters - "Frying Pan"
12. The Mock Turtles - "Big Eyed Beans from Venus"
13. The Beat Poets - "Gimme Dat Harp Boy"
14. Primevals - "Crazy Little Thing"
