= Leggy Mambo =

Studio album by Cud
- Released: 1990
- Recorded: ?
- Genre: Indie rock
- Length: 41:37
- Label: Imaginary Records (United Kingdom)

Cud chronology
2nd Elvis Belt (1990)	Leggy Mambo (1990)	4th Asquarius (1992)

Professional ratings
Review scores
Source	Rating
Allmusic	link

Leggy Mambo (1990) is the second studio album by the Leeds-based indie rock band Cud and released through Imaginary Records.

An extended version called "Leggy Mambo - Gold Top Copy" was released in May 2008 by Cherry Red Records and featured additional remixes.

== Track listing ==
1. "Now!" - 2:24
2. "Heart" – 3:54
3. "Hey, Boots" – 2:47
4. "Love In a Hollow Tree" – 4:32
5. "Love Mandarin" – 3:45
6. "Not Exactly D.L.E.R.C." – 2:26
7. "Robinson Crusoe" – 3:19
8. "Eau Water" – 3:30
9. "Carl's 115th Coach Trip Nightmare" – 3:30
10. "Magic" – 3:54
11. "Syrup and Sour Grapes" – 2:54
12. "Brain on a Slow Train" – 4:42

Catalogue number ILLCD 021.

Leggy Mambo - Gold Top Copy additional tracks

1. "Robinson Crusoe" (Patchbay Demo)
2. "Now!" (Patchbay Demo)
3. "Eau Water" (Patchbay Demo)
4. "L.O.P.H.E."
5. "Love Mandarin" (Alternative Version)
6. "Magic" (Extended Farsley Mix)

== Personnel ==
- Carl Puttnam – vocals
- Mike Dunphy – guitars
- William Potter – bass guitar
- Steve Goodwin – drums
