= The Primevals (band) =

Scottish rock group

- Origin: Glasgow, Scotland
- Genres: Garage rock
- Years active: 1983–1988, 1990, 1997, 2007–present
- Labels: New Rose, Triple Wide
- Members: Michael Rooney; John Honeyman; Paul Bridges; Tom Rafferty; Ady Gillespie; Martyn Rodger
- Past members: Malcolm McDonald; Don Gordon; Rhod Burnett; Gordon Goudie; Richard Mazda; Boyd Pollock; Callum Cuthbertson; Kevin Key; Grahame Bent; Laurie Cuffe; Peter Kern; Jim Byrne

The Primevals are a Scottish rock group formed in 1983, who were influenced by the MC5, The Stooges, Captain Beefheart, Pharoah Sanders, The Gun Club, The Cramps, and 1960s American garage rock.

== History ==
Formed in 1983, the original line-up was Michael Rooney (vocals), Tom Rafferty (guitar), Malcolm McDonald (bass), Kevin Key (guitar), and Rhod Burnett (drums). Their first release was the self-financed "Where Are You?" single in 1984, produced by McDonald, after which they were signed by French independent label New Rose. Their first release for the label was the mini-LP Eternal Hotfire. A further single followed before Gordon left, to be replaced by Malcolm McDonald. They recorded a session for John Peel's BBC Radio 1 show in 1985 (Don Gordon played guitar on this along with Malcolm McDonald), which was released as an EP in 1987. Rafferty left before the band recorded Sound Hole (New Rose 1986) with McDonald handling all guitar duties as the band built up a following in continental Europe, with a further album following for New Rose in 1987 (Live a Little). Gordon Goudie was recruited as a rhythm guitarist in 1986. In late 1987 there was a further line-up change with Burnett and McDonald leaving, the remaining members recruiting Richard Mazda (guitar) and Paul Bridges (drums). A live album was released in 1989 on the DDT label, but the band split up.

The Primevals reformed in 1990 and 1997 with the Rooney, McDonald, Honeyman, and Bridges line-up which lasted 13 years. An anthology of their work, On The Red Eye, for the New Rose record label, was released in November 2005 on LastCall Records. 2007 saw the first all new recordings since 1990, with the release of the album, There Is No Other Life and This Is It, on the band's own label 'Triple Wide'. Another album of new material (Disinhibitor) was released in October 2010, prior to McDonald leaving the group for a third time, citing "musical differences" as a reason for his departure. Heavy War followed in 2012, garnering a four star review from The Scotsman.

John Honeyman, and original Primevals member Tom Rafferty, also performed under the name The Beat Poets, recording two tracks for the compilation album, Fast 'n' Bulbous - A Tribute To Captain Beefheart.

== Current members ==
- Michael Rooney – vocals, harmonica, alto sax, guitar
- John Honeyman – keyboard, guitar, vocals
- Paul Bridges – drums
- Martin Rodger – guitars
- Tom Rafferty – guitars
- Ady Gillespie – bass guitar

== Discography ==
=== Albums ===
- Eternal Hotfire (1985), New Rose
- Sound Hole (1986), New Rose
- Live a Little (1987), New Rose – early copies came with a free single "Diamonds, Furcoat, Champagne"
- Neon Oven – Live at the Rex, Paris (1989), DDT
- Dig (1990), Nibelung
- There Is No Other Life and This Is It (2007), Triple Wide
- Disinhibitor (2010), Triple Wide – initial copies with bonus live CD
- Heavy War (2012)
- Tales of Endless Bliss (2014)
- Dislocation (2017)
- Second Nature (2020)
- New Trip (2021)

Compilations

- On the Red Eye (2005), LastCall

=== Singles, EPs ===
- "Where Are You?" (1984), Raucous
- "Living In Hell" (1985), New Rose
- Elixir of Life EP (1986), New Rose
- The Peel Sessions (18.9.85) EP (1987), Strange Fruit
- "Heya" (1987), New Rose – UK Indie #34
- "Fertile Mind" (1988), New Rose

Splits

- Club Beatroot Part Two (1997), Flotsam & Jetsam: "I Want" (split with Swelling Meg)
