= Showbiz (Cud album) =

Studio album by Cud
- Released: 1994
- Recorded: Funnyfarm Studios, Scotland, and Konk, London
- Genre: Indie rock
- Length: 41:18
- Label: A&M (United Kingdom)
- Producer: Al Clay

Cud chronology
4th Asquarius (1992)	Showbiz (1994)

Professional ratings
Review scores
Source	Rating
Allmusic	4.5/5 stars

Showbiz is the fourth studio album released by the Leeds-based indie rock band Cud in 1994. All tracks were written by vocalist Carl Puttnam and guitarist Mike Dunphy, and it was produced and engineered by Al Clay, who had previously worked with Frank Black, The Boo Radleys and Del Amitri. Showbiz reached number 46 in the UK album chart in April 1994. Lead single "Neurotica" reached number 37 in the UK singles chart in February 1994, while "Sticks and Stones" and "One Giant Love" both failed to reach the top 40.

The album was well received by critics, with Melody Maker describing it as "easily the most polished, carefully crafted Cud record to date". Showbiz failed to build on the success of its predecessor Asquarius, which reached number 30 in the UK album chart in July 1992, and the band split in 1995, although they reformed in 2006 and again in 2010.

== Track listing ==
1. "Somebody Snatched My Action" – 2:40
2. "ESP" – 3:32
3. "Waving and Drowning" – 2:44
4. "Sticks and Stones" – 4:29
5. "The Mystery Deepens" – 3:35
6. "Slip Away" – 4:03
7. "One Giant Love" – 3:05
8. "I Reek of Chic" – 3:02
9. "Not Necessarily Evil" – 3:31
10. "You Lead Me" – 3:34
11. "Torniquet" – 4:00
12. "Neurotica" – 3:03

=== Bonus tracks on 2008 reissue ===
1. "1.W.G.S"
2. "My Need to Hurry"
3. "Ski Bum"
4. "Down The Plug"
5. "Here Come The Old Flames"
6. "Lighthouse Keeper"
7. "Let You Down"
8. "Take The Time and Read My Mind"
9. "Wanting Isn't Getting"
10. "London Nearly Killed Me"

== Personnel ==
- Carl Puttnam – vocals
- Mike Dunphy – guitars and keyboards
- William Potter – bass
- Stephen Goodwin – drums and percussion
