= When in Rome, Kill Me =

Studio album by Cud
- Released: June 1989
- Recorded: March 1989
- Genre: Indie rock
- Length: 39:51
- Label: Imaginary Records (United Kingdom)
- Producer: Alaric Neville, Richard Formby

Cud chronology
When in Rome, Kill Me (1989)	2nd Elvis Belt (1990)

Professional ratings
Review scores
Source	Rating
AllMusic	3/5 stars

When in Rome, Kill Me is the debut album by the Leeds-based indie rock band Cud, released through Imaginary Records. The album was recorded during March 1989 at the Woodhouse Studios in Leeds with Alaric Neville and Richard Formby handling production.

Side 1 of the LP (first seven songs on CD) is linked by short narrative segments (narrated by Cud's drummer Steve Goodwin's landlord John Farrell and Elizabeth Cuthbertson as Bibi) such that the first half of the album loosely forms a single story. In this story, it is implied that the protagonist flees Whitby to Rome after committing some undisclosed crime. There he is reunited with Bibi, possibly an accomplice in the crime, with whom he sleeps, but the following morning he wakes to find Bibi has left and grassed him to the police. We leave the protagonist drunk in a bar, as police sirens approach, with him rueing, "I would have got away with it, if it hadn't been for those bastards, bastard meddling kids."

"Only (A Prawn in Whitby)" was supposedly inspired by a chance encounter of Cud's manager with Morrissey. Allegedly, the vegetarian lead singer of the Smiths was seen partaking of a single prawn. The story is now accepted to be apocryphal.

The album reached number three in the UK Indie Chart in 1989.

== Track listing ==
Side 1 - there are related comments to the narrative shown on the album and in brackets after each track)

1. "When in Rome, Kill Me" - 2.23 (He wasn't sure either! He was edging his bets.)
2. "Only (A Prawn in Whitby)" - 3.26 (Better make this one a single.)
3. "Bibi Couldn't See" - 3.01 (Myopic or biopic? Take your pick.)
4. "Strange Kind of Love" - 3.28 (Passions flair when the elocution gets tough, and the rough gets going.)
5. "Push and Shove" - 3.27 (The quality of Trugoy is strained.)
6. "Day Crime Paid" - 4.14 (That was the day, the day crime paid, that was.)
7. "When in Rome, Kill Me Again" - 1.02 (If you have stomachs.)

Side 2

1. "I've Had It With Blondes" - 4.29
2. "Van Van Van" - 2.29
3. "Vocally Speaking" - 3.38
4. "Wobbly Jelly" - 1.50
5. "Alison Springs" - 2.50
6. "Epicurean's Answer" - 4.02
7. "Bomba Boy" Available only on the 1992 CD version.

An expanded CD version (without Bomba Boy) was released through Cherry Red Records in 2007 and included previously unreleased bonus tracks

1. "Van Van Van" (BBC Radio Leeds Session) - 2.44
2. "I've Had It With Blondes" (Demo) - 3.23
3. "BB Couldn't C" (3rd John Peel Session) - 2.48
4. "Strange Kind of Love" (Live BBC Sound City Sheffield) - 3.33
5. "Alison Springs" (Unreleased Version) - 3.04
6. "Only (A Prawn in Whitby)" (Carefree Sud) - 4.00
7. "Starry Eyes" (Carefree Sud) - 2.03
8. "Vocally Speaking/Wobbly Jelly" (Carefree Sud) - 5.13

== Personnel ==
- Carl Puttnam – vocals
- Mike Dunphy – guitars
- William Potter – bass guitar
- Steve Goodwin – drums
