= Elvis Belt =

Compilation album by Cud

Compilation album by Cud
- Released: 1990
- Genre: Indie rock
- Label: Imaginary

Cud chronology
1st When in Rome, Kill Me (1989)	Elvis Belt (1990)	3rd Leggy Mambo (1990)

Professional ratings
Review scores
Source	Rating
AllMusic	2.5/5 stars
Select	3/5

Elvis Belt is an album of selected early singles, EPs and Peel Sessions released by the Leeds-based indie rock band Cud in 1990 through Imaginary Records. LP catalogue number ILLCD 013

The cover image features original Cud guitarist Dave Read sporting the Elvis Belt that gave him his nickname.

Vinyl copies of the LP included a cartoon strip drawn by Cud bassist William Potter.

An expanded double-CD version was released through Cherry Red Records in March 2008 and entitled Elvis Handbag.

== Track listing ==
Elvis Belt

1. "Slack Time" - 2.55
2. "Make No Bones" - 2.23
3. "Treat Me Bad" - 4.44
4. "Punishment-Reward Relationship" - 2.35
5. "Under My Hat" - 2.45
6. "Lola" - 3.37
7. "Urban Spaceman" - 1.07
8. "Art!" - 1.54
9. "You're The Boss" - 3.05
10. "Only (A Prawn in Whitby)" - 3.08
11. "Hey!Wire (The Stratospheric Mix) [remixed by Earl Ether]" - 2.57
12. "I've Had It With Blondes" - 3.31

Elvis Handbag Expanded version CD2

1. "Mind the Gap" (Peel Session) - 2.11
2. "Everybody Works So Hard" (Peel Session) - 2.43
3. "BB Cudn't C" (Peel Session) - 2.49
4. "Bohemian Rhapsody" - 2.53
5. "Manchester" - 3.01
6. "Purple Love Balloon" (Original Version) - 4.57
7. "Possession" (Original Version) - 3.53
8. "Remember What It Is That You Love" - 4.31
9. "Marjorie" - 2.03
10. "Down Down" - 3.21
11. "Magic" (1994 Version) - 4.01
12. "Living Changing" (Previously Unreleased) - 5.03
13. "Before Tomorrow" - 3.09
14. "Judas Kiss" - 3.15
15. "Back Door Santa" (hidden track) - 4.11
16. "Weirdy Beardy" (hidden track) - 5.56

== Personnel ==
- Carl Puttnam – vocals
- Mike Dunphy – guitars
- William Potter – bass guitar
- Steve Goodwin – drums
