= Asquarius =

Studio album by Cud
- Released: 1992
- Recorded: January 1992
- Studio: Woodlands, Castleford; Woodhouse, Leeds
- Genre: Indie rock
- Length: 43:27
- Label: A&M (United Kingdom)
- Producer: Jon Langford, Dave Creffield

Cud chronology
Leggy Mambo (1990)	Asquarius (1992)	Showbiz (1994)

Professional ratings
Review scores
Source	Rating
AllMusic	4.5/5 stars
Billboard	favourable

Asquarius (1992) is the third studio album released by the Leeds-based indie rock band Cud which reached number 30 in the UK album chart. Q magazine included it in their 1998 issue as part of their essential dozen Britpop records to have in your collection. The album was reissued in 2007 in expanded form. The album was recorded at Woodlands in Castleford, except for "Possession", which was recorded at Woodhouse in Leeds in January 1992. Mixing took place at Jacobs in Farnham, and Metropolis in London in February 1992. The recordings were mainly produced by Jon Langford, except for "Possession", which was produced by Dave Creffield; the latter served as engineer throughout the sessions, with assistance from Neil Amor.

== Track listing ==
All songs written by Mike Dunphy and Carl Puttnam, except "Beyond Hair" and "Possession" by Cud.

1. "Rich and Strange" – 3:38
2. "Easy" – 2:44
3. "Sometimes Rightly, Sometimes Wrongly" – 3:10
4. "Spanish Love Song" – 3:25
5. "Magic Alex" – 4:16
6. "Beyond Hair" – 3:12
7. "Pink Flamingo" – 3:50
8. "Possession" – 3:41
9. "Through the Roof" – 3:59
10. "Soul Food" – 2:56
11. "Once Again" – 5:07
12. "No Smoking" – 3:29

=== Bonus tracks on 2007 reissue ===
13. "Do It Again"
14. "Ariel" (instrumental version)
15. "Profession"
16. "Spanish Love Song" (acoustic)
17. "Purple Love Balloon" (live BBC Sound City session)
18. "Possession" (live BBC Sound City session)

== Personnel ==
Personnel per booklet.

Cud

- Carl Puttnam – vocals
- Mike Dunphy – guitars
- William Potter – bass guitar
- Steve Goodwin – drums

Additional musicians

- Martin Ditcham – percussion (tracks 1 and 11)
- Susie Honeyman – violin (tracks 1 and 11)
- Tris Williams – additional percussion (track 4)
- The Fantom Horns – horns (track 5)
  - Richard Sutton – trumpet
  - Miles Tranter – tenor saxophone
  - David Tyler – trombone
  - Steve Fantom – trombone
- Jon Langford – keyboards (track 5), additional acoustic guitar (track 11)
- Dave Creffield – keyboards (track 5)
- Mark Dunphy – harmonica (track 10)

Production and design

- Jon Langford – producer (all except track 8)
- Dave Creffield – producer (track 8), engineer
- Neil Amor – assistant
- Cud – sleeve concept
- Tim Jarvis – band photography
- T&CP Associates – design, artwork
