= Having (album) =

Studio album by Trespassers William
- Released: February 28, 2006
- Recorded: 2004–2005
- Genre: Indie rock Dream pop Shoegaze
- Length: 55:59
- Label: Nettwerk Records
- Producer: David Fridmann

Trespassers William chronology
Different Stars (2002)	Having (2006)	Noble House (2007)

Professional ratings
Review scores
Source	Rating
AllMusic	3.5/5 stars
Now	2/5

Having is the third album by the American rock band Trespassers William. It was released on February 28, 2006, on Nettwerk Records.

== Critical reception ==
Exclaim! deemed the album the band's finest, calling it "melancholic, atmospheric, intense and beautiful."

The Orange County Register called it "another set of languid, dreamy, morose, kinda dull bits designed to make you curl up in a fetal ball and weep, or gaze at gray skies from rain-stained windows, or just gently slip into a prolonged coma."

In February 2007, American webzine Somewhere Cold voted Having No. 10 on their 2006 Somewhere Cold Awards Hall of Fame.

== Track listing ==
1. "Safe, Sound"
2. "What of Me"
3. "Weakening"
4. "Eyes Like Bottles"
5. "I Don't Mind"
6. "Ledge"
7. "And We Lean In"
8. "My Hands Up"
9. "Low Point"
10. "No One"
11. "Matching Weight"

== Production notes ==
- David Fridmann · production/mixing
- Greg Calbi · mastering
