= The Chameleons =

English rock band

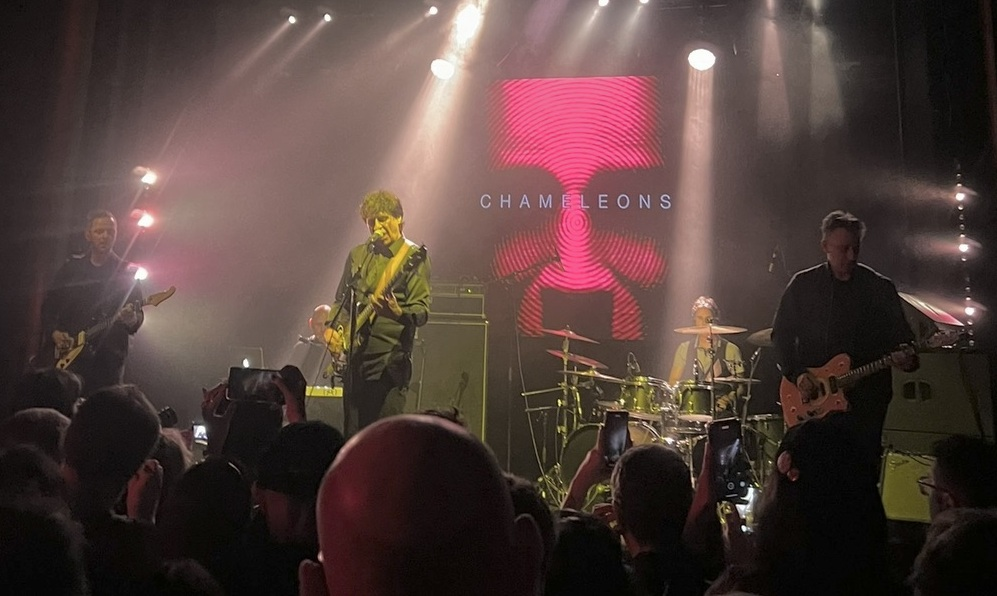
- The Chameleons performing at Primavera Sound 2024

Background information
- Also known as: The Chameleons UK (for North America)
- Origin: Middleton, England
- Genre: Post-punk
- Works: The Chameleons discography
- Years active: 1981–1987; 2000–2003; 2021–present
- Labels: Epic; Statik; MCA; Geffen; Glass Pyramid; Paradiso; Moochin' About; Artful; Cherry Red; Metropolis
- Members: Vox; Reg Smithies; Stephen Rice; Todd Demma; Danny Ashberry
- Past members: Dave Fielding; Neil Dwerryhouse; Chris Oliver; Brian Schofield; John Lever; Martin Jackson; Alistair Lewthwaite; Andy Clegg; Kwasi Asante; Ray Bowles
- Website: chameleonsband.com

The Chameleons are an English rock band formed in Middleton, Greater Manchester, in 1981. The band's classic line-up consisted of bassist and vocalist Mark Burgess, guitarists Reginald Smithies and Dave Fielding and drummer John Lever.

The band released their debut studio album, Script of the Bridge, in 1983. They followed it with What Does Anything Mean? Basically and Strange Times in 1985 and 1986, respectively, before abruptly breaking up in 1987 due to internal tensions and the sudden death of the band's manager.

The Chameleons reformed in 2000, releasing their fourth studio album Why Call It Anything (2001) as well as the acoustic albums Strip (2000) and This Never Ending Now (2002). Renewed tensions caused the group to break-up again in 2003. Burgess and Lever continued to play the Chameleons' songs live with their new project ChameleonsVox, although Lever later left that group and died in 2017. Burgess and Smithies reformed the Chameleons in 2021 with two members of Burgess' ChameleonsVox group.

Known for their atmospheric, guitar-based sound, the Chameleons are regarded as one of the most underrated Manchester bands of the 1980s. They did not attain the commercial success of other groups from the Manchester scene but developed a cult following.

== History ==
=== Early career (1981–1982) ===
The Chameleons were formed in Middleton, Greater Manchester, England in 1981 by Mark Burgess, Reg Smithies and Dave Fielding. Burgess previously played with the Cliches, while Smithies and Fielding had performed with Years. They started as a trio—Burgess as lead vocalist and bassist, Smithies and Fielding both on guitar—without a drummer. They later recruited fellow Middletonian Brian Schofield, who was soon replaced by Dukinfield-based John Lever, previously of the Politicians. Former Magazine drummer Martin Jackson briefly replaced Lever during 1982–83 while the latter was on sabbatical. The band were then inspired by U2's early recordings : "U2's first record was a big album for us. Edge's guitar opened it up in terms of how you could build an ambient atmosphere".

After performing a 1981 radio session for BBC Radio 1 DJ John Peel, the band signed a recording contract with Epic Records, then a subsidiary of CBS Records International. Their debut single "In Shreds" released in March 1982, was produced by Steve Lillywhite. The single's cover – a harrowing painting by Smithies, who created the artwork for all of their releases – mirrored the band's tense, atmospheric sound. During this time, the Chameleons' independent style clashed with their label's visions for the band. Wary of the loss of credibility Altered Images had suffered due to buckling to CBS' demands on packaging, the Chameleons were protective of their image and consequently were dropped by the label soon after the release of "In Shreds".

=== Script of the Bridge and What Does Anything Mean? Basically (1983–1985) ===
The Chameleons subsequently signed to UK label Statik Records, a subsidiary of Virgin Records, on which they released their debut studio album, Script of the Bridge, in 1983. Script of the Bridge, featuring the singles "Up the Down Escalator", "As High as You Can Go" and "A Person Isn't Safe Anywhere These Days", showcased Burgess's strong vocals and the band's guitar-based sound, with careful use of synthesisers. Upon its release, the UK press said that the artwork looked like a "seventies Genesis style drawing rather unhappily adorning the sleeve". A NME concert review described their music as "guitars slipping and sliding on slopes of echo, snapping their wires, fussing and fretting over stampeding drums, getting angry and staccato and falling to harmonic whispers". Concerning the guitar playing, it was said that there was an influence of U2 and Echo & the Bunnymen.

Statik's status as a subsidiary of Virgin prevented the band from qualifying for the independent charts, which resulted in reduced coverage by the British music press. MCA Records released the album in the United States in an abridged form, minus four songs, which angered the band. However, the US release and a 1984 American tour did earn them significant college radio airplay and a loyal fanbase.

Their second studio album, What Does Anything Mean? Basically, was released in 1985 by Statik, which also reissued "In Shreds" and its B-side "Less Than Human" as the 12" Nostalgia EP, adding the previously unreleased track "Nostalgia". Basically established the band as a promising, guitar-based group.

=== Strange Times and break-up (1985–1987) ===
Regular touring after the release of Basically (1985), along with efforts by the band's manager, Tony Fletcher, persuaded David Geffen to sign the band to Geffen Records, which released their third studio album, Strange Times, in 1986. A dark, complex work, it contained the singles "Tears" and "Swamp Thing", but proved to be their final record of the period. A rift existed within the band, particularly between Burgess and Fielding, and Fletcher's sudden death in 1987 due to cardiac arrest led to the group disbanding.

=== Post-break-up (1988–1999) ===
After the break-up, numerous spin-off bands emerged, none of which achieved much success. Burgess and Lever formed the Sun and the Moon, recruiting Andy Whitaker and Andy Clegg to replace Smithies and Fielding. They released an eponymous studio album on Geffen in 1988, but separated the next year. Burgess then embarked on a solo career, while the remaining members briefly continued on as Weaveworld. Smithies and Fielding formed the Reegs with the help of vocalist Gary Lavery and a drum machine, and released two studio albums, Return of the Sea Monkeys (1991) and Rock the Magic Rock (1992), on the independent label Imaginary Records.

Burgess released his debut solo studio album, Zima Junction, in 1993, and toured America the following year with his backing band the Sons of God. He released another studio album, Spring Blooms Tra-La (1994), as well as a live album, Manchester 93 (1994), before partnering with Yves Altana in 1995, releasing Paradyning the same year. Afterwards, he founded Invincible with Altana and drummer Geoff Walker. They self-released their debut studio album, Venus, in 1999, with most sales being digital. He also worked with Bird, the Messengers and Black Swan Lane. Lever later joined Bushart, who released the album Yesterday Is History (2008).

In 1990, the Chameleons posthumously released an EP, Tony Fletcher Walked on Water.... La La La La La-La La-La-La, with the title paying tribute to their former manager. They also issued numerous live albums and compilations.

=== First reformation, Why Call It Anything and split (2000–2021) ===
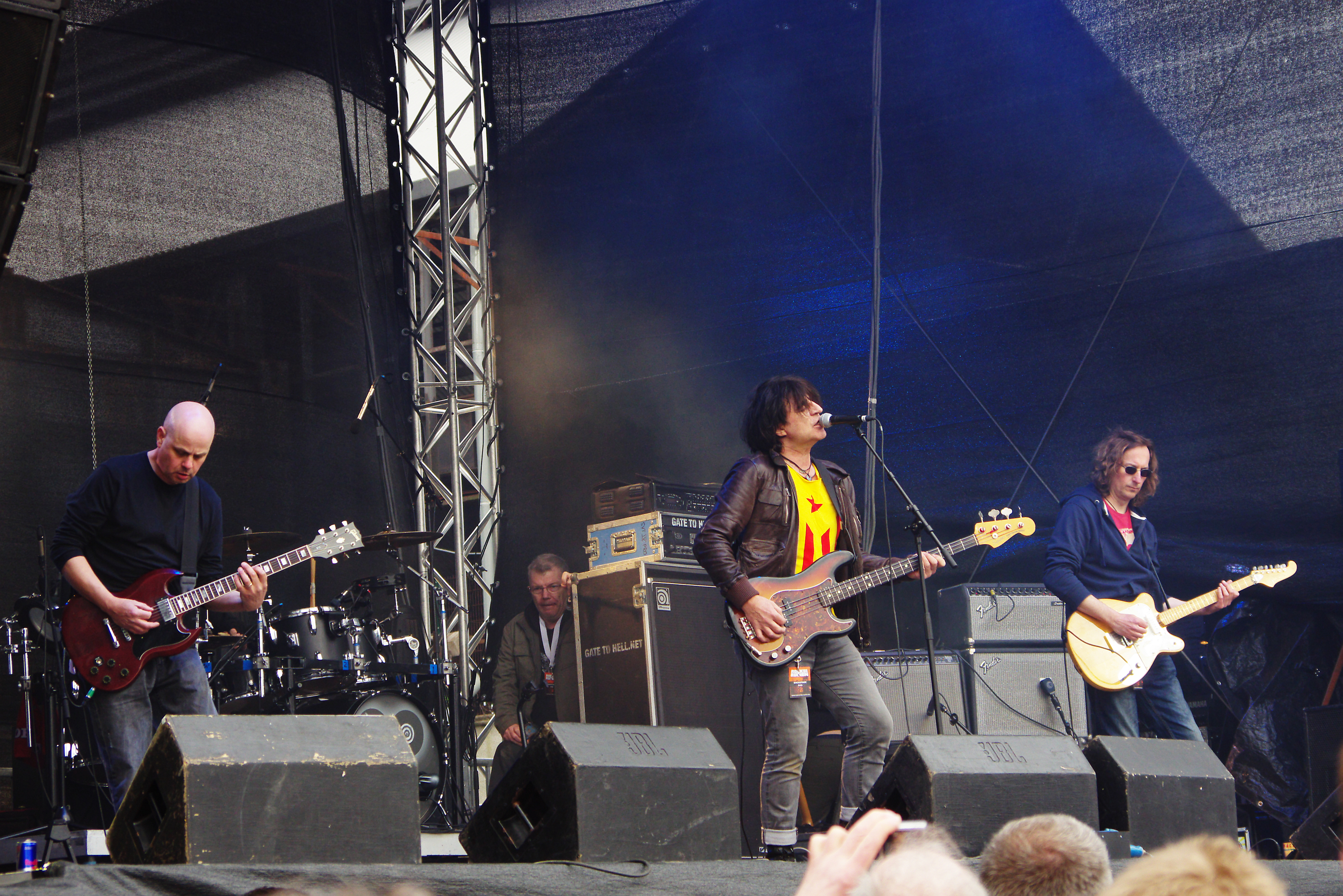
ChameleonsVox performing at Rock in den Ruinen 2013 in Dortmund, Germany

The Chameleons reconvened in January 2000 to prepare for a series of concerts in The Witchwood, Ashton-under-Lyne, one of the band's favourite venues, in May. May 2000 also saw the release of the album Strip, which featured old material in an acoustic format. The concerts were a success, and they expanded the reunion tour to include European dates in the summer and two California dates that fall. They released a new studio album, Why Call It Anything, in 2001, followed by another unplugged album, This Never Ending Now, in 2002 and a full American tour. Renewed tensions led to the band dissolving once again in early 2003.

In 2009, Burgess and Lever reformed to play Chameleons back catalogue material under the name ChameleonsVox. They issued an EP, M+D=1(8), in November 2013. In addition to Burgess and Lever, ChameleonsVox line-ups have included guitarists Roger Lavallee, Justin Lomery, Andrew Abernathy, Neil Dwerryhouse and Chris Oliver; bassists Frank Deserto and Jessica Espeleta; and drummers Glenn Maryansky, Yves Altana and Stephen Rice. Lever later went on to leave the band.

In 2014, Lever and Fielding reunited to record an album, Endless Sea, as Red-Sided Garter Snakes. The album, featuring contributions from vocalist James Mudriczki of Puressence and Clegg, was released in July 2015.

Lever died on 13 March 2017, following a short illness, at the age of 55.

=== Second reformation (2021–present) ===
The Chameleons reformed under the official name in May 2021 when Burgess and Smithies recorded a live album, Edge Sessions (Live from the Edge), with guitarist Chris Oliver and drummer Stephen Rice, who had been members of Burgess' ChameleonsVox group. The live album was released on April 25, 2022 on Metropolis Records.

With Oliver and Rice, the Chameleons announced their first tour in 20 years, playing the United States in fall 2022 with the Mission and Theatre of Hate. The tour was ultimately postponed to 2023. Instead, the band opened for She Wants Revenge in fall 2022. The lineup for this reformation featured founding members Burgess and Smithies alongside drummer Todd Demma, Rice on guitars and keyboardist Danny Ashberry. Their first new studio release in 21 years, the Where Are You? EP, came out on 24 May 2024. Their fifth studio album, Arctic Moon, was released on 12 September 2025 on Metropolis Records. In April 2026, the band released a new song "Rock N Roll Star" for the charity compilation A Goth Deed For Palestine: Volume II.

== Musical style ==
During the Chameleons' early career, the British music press often used terms such as "sonic architects" and "sonic cathedrals" when describing the band, due to their atmospheric sound. Smithies and Fielding provided shimmering guitar riffs, while Lever and Burgess on drums and bass, respectively, gave the band a solid, rhythmic foundation.

The Chameleons emerged as Thatcherism was beginning to have its effect on England's former industrial towns, and their music was imbued with a sense of anxiety and a longing for the security of innocence. Burgess's impassioned vocal delivery complemented his lyrics, which touched on the alienation created in many British communities by the decline of manufacturing and industry, and the consequent disruption of social order. Despite the bleak landscapes they were surrounded by, the band were not weighed down by their environment, but attempted to triumph over it. Burgess said in 2013 that, though growing up in a post-industrial, northern town must have some influence on one's music, he felt the Chameleons would have sounded similar regardless of where they originated from.

== Legacy ==
The Chameleons have been named as an influence by various artists, including Oasis, the Verve, Interpol, the Smashing Pumpkins and Alcest.

Oasis's songwriter Noel Gallagher has expressed his liking for the album Strange Times (1986) saying, "It must have influenced my early years as a song writer because I can hear me in it everywhere!". Guitarist Nick McCabe of the Verve named Script of the Bridge (1983) as one of his ten favorite albums. The Flaming Lips included "Up the Down Escalator" in the track listing of a CD compilation they did for Late Night Tales. The band have also been cited by the Charlatans's lead vocalist Tim Burgess. Moby has been quoted expressing admiration for their work. Interpol's frontman Paul Banks has said that their bassist Carlos [Dengler] was "a fan" of the band. Sweet Trip vocalist Valerie Cooper listed Script of the Bridge as a musical influence. The Smashing Pumpkins frontman Billy Corgan named the Chameleons as one of the formative British bands he listened to in the 1980s. Neige, the founder of French black metal band Alcest, said his playing was influenced by the Chameleons' dual guitar leads and often names them as one of history's most underrated bands.

== Band members ==
Current members

- Mark "Vox" Burgess – bass, lead vocals, acoustic guitar (1981–1987, 2000–2003, 2021–present)
- Reg Smithies – rhythm guitar (1981–1987, 2000–2003, 2021–present)
- Stephen Rice – lead guitar, backing vocals (2021–present)
- Todd Demma – drums, percussion (2021–present)
- Danny Ashberry – keyboards, backing vocals, bass, acoustic guitar (2021–present)

Former members

- Dave Fielding – lead guitar, keyboards (1981–1987, 2000–2003)
- John Lever – drums, percussion (1981, 1983–1987, 2000–2003; died 2017)
- Brian Schofield – drums, percussion (1981)
- Martin Jackson – drums, percussion (1982)
- Kwasi Asante – percussion (2001–2003)

The core quartet were augmented by keyboardists Alistair Lewthwaite and Andy Clegg for live shows in the 1980s, and by percussionist-vocalist Kwasi Asante during their reunion period.

Timeline

== Discography ==
Studio albums

- Script of the Bridge (1983)
- What Does Anything Mean? Basically (1985)
- Strange Times (1986)
- Why Call It Anything (2001)
- Arctic Moon (2025)
