= Tony Fletcher Walked on Water.... La La La La La-La La-La-La =

EP by the Chameleons
- Released: 1 October 1990
- Recorded: 1987
- Genre: Post-punk
- Length: 21:39
- Label: Glass Pyramid

The Chameleons chronology
Strange Times (1986)	Tony Fletcher Walked on Water.... La La La La La-La La-La-La (1990)	John Peel Sessions (1990)

Tony Fletcher Walked on Water.... La La La La La-La La-La-La is an extended play (EP) by English rock band the Chameleons. It was released on 1 October 1990 through record label Glass Pyramid. It consists of the Chameleons' final recordings in 1987 prior to their breakup.

== Content ==
The EP was named after the band's manager from 1986 to 1987, Tony Fletcher. The song "Free for All" was named after an episode of the 1960s television programme The Prisoner.

== Recording ==
In 1987, the Chameleons were ready to record their fourth studio album, to be released on Geffen. The band recorded four songs which were supposed to be released prior to the full album. Fletcher died of a heart attack just two days before these songs were recorded, and the band broke up acrimoniously soon after.

== Release ==
In 1990, the band's main songwriter, Mark Burgess, formed the record label Glass Pyramid to help pay off the band's debts. The still-unused tracks from the 1987 Geffen session were to be used as the first Glass Pyramid release.

Tony Fletcher Walked on Water was released on 1 October 1990. 1,100 copies were pressed for each format of CD and 12" vinyl. However, due to legal threats by guitarist Dave Fielding, the EP never made it to shops.

Some copies were provided for people in the music industry, and Burgess sold copies at his concerts and gave away free copies to people who donated to LiBEARty, a bear protection campaign run by World Animal Protection. Additionally, US label Pivot Records in Grand Rapids, Michigan continued to make 12" copies available.

The album has since been included as a bonus disc with the compilation Return of the Roughnecks.

== Critical reception ==
Professional ratings
Review scores
Source	Rating
AllMusic	4/5 stars
Trouser Press	(favourable)

Trouser Press wrote that the EP "[captured] the band peaking as it shattered". Ned Raggett of AllMusic wrote "the sheer sense of what might have been from this four-song release amazes".

== Track listing ==
Side A
No.	Title	Length
1.	"Is It Any Wonder"	5:46
2.	"Free for All"	4:25

Side B
No.	Title	Length
1.	"The Healer"	7:07
2.	"Denims and Curls"	4:23
