= Lotte Kestner =

American singer-songwriter

- Also known as: Lotte Kestner
- Born: Anna-Lynne Williams; February 8, 1978 (age 47)
- Origin: Laguna Hills, California, U.S.
- Genres: Indie rock, folk rock, dream pop, shoegaze
- Occupations: Singer, songwriter
- Instruments: Vocals, guitar, keyboards
- Years active: 1997–present

Anna-Lynne Williams (born February 8, 1978), better known by the stage name Lotte Kestner, is an American singer and songwriter. She started her musical career as vocalist for the indie rock band Trespassers William in 1997, and adopted the Lotte Kestner name in 2007 for solo recordings. She was also a member of the duo Ormonde.

== Early life ==
Anna-Lynne Williams was born on February 8, 1978, and grew up in Laguna Hills, California.

== Career ==
Williams provided guest vocals on "The Leaving Song Pt. II", the second single from AFI's 2003 album Sing the Sorrow. Her parts were recorded in an hour at Hollywood's Cello Studios and it was the first time that Williams was asked to do vocal session work.

Williams is featured on "Hold Tight London" from the Chemical Brothers' 2005 Grammy-winning album, Push the Button.

She has collaborated with numerous other artists, including Mark Burgess, Courtney Marie Andrews, Robert Deeble, Damien Jurado, Anomie Belle, Motopony and Rocky Votolato, Arnar Guðjónsson of Leaves, Delerium, Minotaur Shock, Tuesday the Sky, Fieldhead, Sadistik and Blue Sky Black Death.

In 2007, Williams started recording her own music as Lotte Kestner, self-releasing China Mountain in 2008. In December 2008, American webzine Somewhere Cold ranked China Mountain No. 11 on their 2008 Somewhere Cold Awards Hall of Fame. She followed it in 2011 with a covers album, Stolen (Saint-Loup Records). In 2013, she was back with more of her own material on The Bluebird of Happiness (Saint Marie Records), for which she wrote all but one track (with the composer credit to Anna-Lynne Williams). An 8-track EP titled Until was released through Saint-Loup Records on April 16, 2013. A collection of covers called "Covers" was released in 2017 in Japan (Lirico) and Korea (Aulos Media). Her latest album, Off White, was released on Saint Marie Records on September 1, 2017. It was preceded the previous month by a Chris Cunningham-directed music video for "Ghosts".

Kestner has also released four download-only collections, generally combining demos, outtakes, and newly recorded material: China Mountain B-Sides (2009), Trespassers William Songs Solo (2011), All That You Start B-Sides (2012), Extra Covers Collection (2012), and Best-of: Requested Cover Songs (6 October 2015). She contributed the song "Confession" to the Saint Marie Records sampler Static Waves (2012). Her cover of Beyoncé's "Halo" was prominently featured in an episode of HBO's The Young Pope in 2017. She contributed an original composition titled called "In Glass" to the indie film Maybe Someday. She has also published three books of poetry, Split Infinitive, In the Night I Go Sailing, and Blind Accidents, and has recorded two albums with her indie band Ormonde. She starred in the film I Cannot Go On As I Am, which came out in 2014 and which also contains live musical performances.

In 2020, Kestner's 2011 cover of New Order's 1987 song "True Faith" was itself covered by actress Ashley Johnson (in-character as Ellie) in a trailer for the video game The Last of Us Part II. Kestner was not mentioned or credited, leading her to tweet that she was "heartbroken". The game's director Neil Druckmann apologized and tweeted that this was "due to an oversight on [the game studio's] end" and that the studio would "[rectify] this ASAP". Kestner was subsequently credited in promotional material that used her cover. In 2023, her cover of "True Faith" played over the end credits of "Please Hold to My Hand", an episode of the television adaption of The Last of Us.

== Personal life ==
Williams is a long-time resident of Seattle.

== Albums ==
=== Solo ===
Albums

- China Mountain (5 May 2008)
- Stolen (1 June 2011)
- The Bluebird of Happiness (26 February 2013)
- Covers (January 2017)
- Off White (1 September 2017)
- Covers, Vol. 2 (21 February 2020)

EPs

- Until EP (16 April 2013)
- Covering Depeche Mode EP (April 2015)

Independent/online releases

- China Mountain B-Sides (1 April 2009)
- Trespassers William Songs Solo (28 August 2011)
- All That You Start B-Sides (19 June 2012)
- Extra Covers Collection (5 October 2012)
- Best-of: Requested Cover Songs (6 October 2015)

=== Ormonde ===
- Machine (7 August 2012)
- Cartographer/Explorer (11 November 2014)
