= Imaginary Records =

Imaginary Records was an independent record label based in Heywood, Greater Manchester, England, which specialised mainly in indie rock and post-punk. It was started in 1985 by Alan Duffy, known for his lyrical contributions to Porcupine Tree's first two albums, On the Sunday of Life and Up the Downstair, and Andy Hopkins.

The label released many albums by the Chameleons and related bands, including the Reegs, and Mark Burgess' Zima Junction.

The label also released a number of artist tribute albums, on which contemporary acts recorded cover versions of influential artists such as Captain Beefheart, the Velvet Underground, the Byrds, Syd Barrett, the Kinks, and Nick Drake, leading to Duffy being described as a "tribute entrepreneur". Contributors to this series of albums included Sonic Youth, the Membranes, Nirvana, Echo & the Bunnymen, XTC, Dinosaur Jr., Ride, Screaming Trees and Buffalo Tom. The albums were released in the US by Communion Records.

== Discography ==
=== Albums ===
- Tiny Lights - Hot Chocolate Massage (ILLCD 011)
- The Mock Turtles - Turtle Soup (ILLCD 012)
- Cud - Elvis Belt (ILLCD 013)
- Various - Outlaw Blues - A Tribute to Bob Dylan (ILLCD 014)
- The Beat Poets - Totally Radio (ILLCD 015)
- Various - Heaven & Hell - A Tribute To The Velvet Underground (Volume One) (ILLCD 016)
- Various - Heaven & Hell - A Tribute To The Velvet Underground (Volume Two) (ILLCD 017)
- Spiral Jetty - Dog star (ILLCD 018)
- The Mock Turtles - 87-90 (ILLCD 019)
- The Infant God - Puberty (ILLCD 020)
- Cud - Leggy Mambo (ILLCD 021)
- Various - Heaven & Hell - A Tribute To The Velvet Underground (Volume Three) (ILLCD 022)
- Various - Through the Looking Glass - 1966 (ILLCD 023)
- Bill Nelson - Luminous (ILLCD 024)
- Various - 1965 - Through the Looking Glass (ILLCD 025)
- Various - Brittle Days - A Tribute to Nick Drake (ILLCD 026)
- The Rhythm Sisters - Willerby (ILLCD 027)
- The Cherryblades - In Dependence (ILLCD 028)
- The Reegs - Return of the Sea Monkeys (ILLCD 029)
- The Prudes - Designer Karma (ILLCD 030)
- Various - Out of Time - The Very Best of the Imaginary Tribute Series (ILLCD 031)
- Various - Through the Looking Glass - 1968 (ILLCD 032)
- Various - You Done My Brain In - A Tribute to the Bonzo Dog Doo-Dah Band (ILLCD 033)
- Various - Seconds Out Round One - Live Hit The North Sessions (ILLCD 034)
- The Chameleons - Here Today ... Gone Tomorrow (ILLCD 035)
- The Chameleons - Live in Toronto (ILLCD 036)
- The Chameleons - Here Today ... Gone Tomorrow/Live In Toronto (ILLCD 037)
- The Chameleons - Free Trade Hall Rehearsal (ILLCD 039)
- Various - Outlaw Blues - A Tribute to Bob Dylan (Volume Two) (ILLCD 040)
- The Chameleons - Dali's Picture (ILLCD 041)
- The Chameleons - Auffuhrung In Berlin (ILLCD 042)
- The Chameleons - Dali's Picture / Live In Berlin (ILLCD 043)
- Mark Burgess and the Sons of God - Zima Junction (ILLCD 044)
- The Reegs - Rock the Magic Rock (ILLCD 045)
- Who By Fire - Road Movie (ILLCD 046)
- Various - Fifteen Minutes - A Tribute to The Velvet Underground (ILLCD 047P)
- Various - Beyond the Wildwood - A Tribute To Syd Barrett (ILLCD 100)
- Various - Fast 'n' Bulbous - A Tribute to Captain Beefheart (ILLCD 200)
- Various - Shangri-La - A Tribute to the Kinks (ILLCD 300)
- Various - Time Between - A Tribute to The Byrds (ILLCD 400)
- Cud - When In Rome, Kill Me (ILLCD 500)
- Various - Stoned Again - A Tribute to the Rolling Stones (ILLCD 600)
- Benny Profane – Dumb Luck Charm/Trapdoor Swing (ILLCD 700)
- Various - If 6 Was 9 - A Tribute To Jimi Hendrix (ILLCD 800)
- The Bachelor Pad - Tales of Hofmann (ILLCD 900)
- Various - Through the Looking Glass - 1967 (ILLCD 1000)

=== EPs ===
- The Stairs - Last Time Around Stairs (MIRACD 040)
- The Chemistry Set - (Don't) Turn Away EP (MIRACD 026)
- The Chemistry Set - The Candleburns EP (MIRACD 030)

== See also ==
- List of record labels: I–Q
