= Vox (musician) =

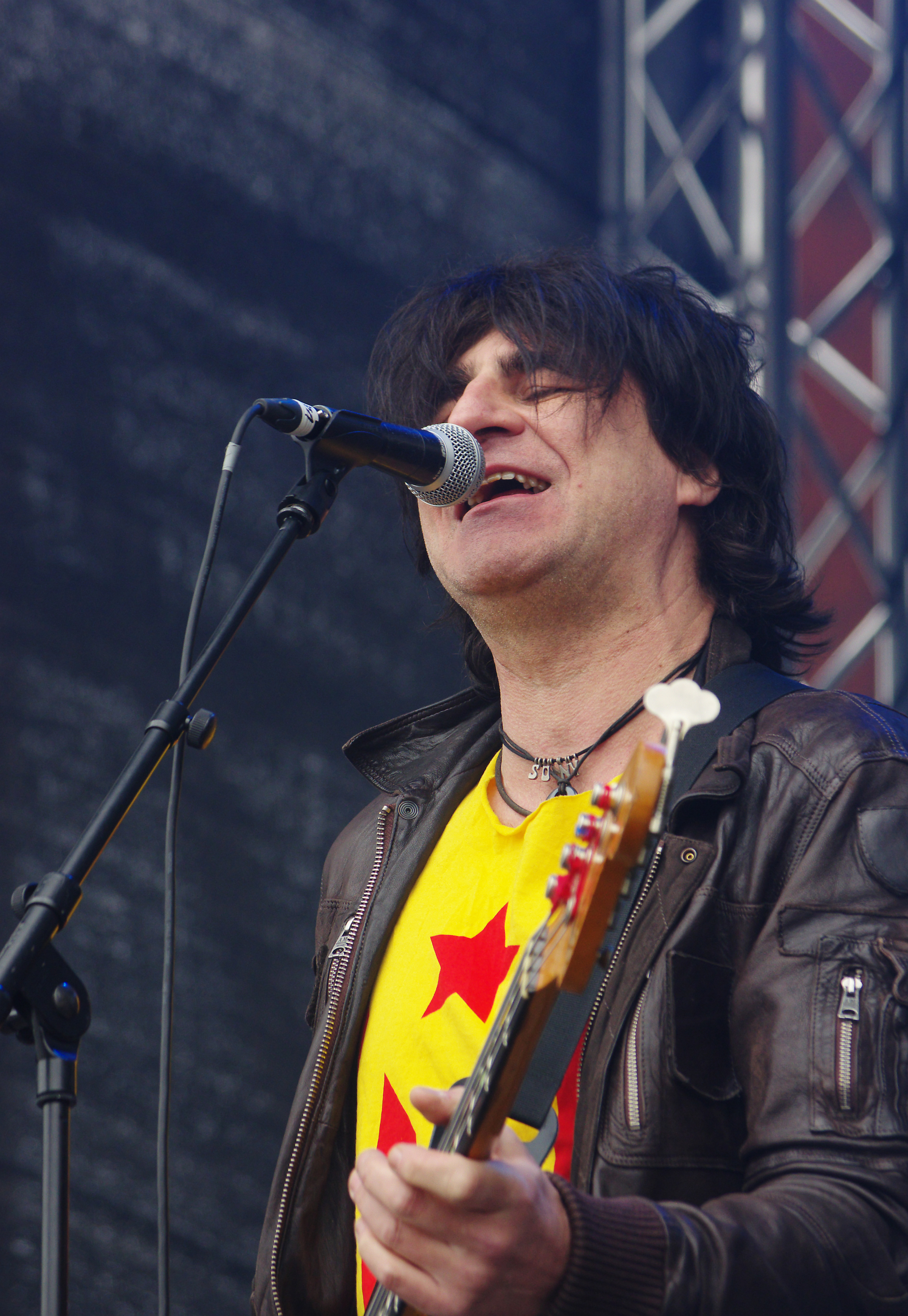
- Vox performing with ChameleonsVox in Dortmund, Germany 2013

Background information
- Born: Mark Burgess; 11 May 1960 (age 65); Manchester, England
- Genres: Post-punk; alternative rock; dream pop; new wave
- Occupations: Singer; songwriter; musician
- Instruments: Vocals; bass guitar; guitar; keyboards
- Years active: 1981–present
- Labels: Imaginary; Pivot; Indigo; Dead Dead Good; Alchemized

Vox (born Mark Burgess; 11 May 1960) is an English singer, bassist and songwriter, best known as the frontman of post-punk band the Chameleons.

== Early life ==
Vox was born as Mark Burgess in Manchester.

== Career ==
In 1981, Burgess (ex-the Cliches) formed the Chameleons with guitarists Dave Fielding and Reg Smithies, and drummer John Lever. After three studio albums, the band broke up in 1987, with the relationship between Burgess and Fielding particularly strained.

Burgess and Lever then formed the Sun and the Moon with guitarist Andy Clegg, who had played keyboards with the Chameleons and Andy Whitaker. They released an eponymous studio album in 1988 on Geffen Records before breaking up.

In 1993, Burgess released his debut solo studio album (under the name Mark Burgess & the Sons of God), Zima Junction, backed by former Wonky Alice guitarist Yves Altana, among others. In 1994, Burgess and Altana released the studio album Paradyning.

In 1997, Burgess and Altana formed Invincible, recording the studio album Venus with drummer Geoff Walker in a water tower in North Manchester. The group toured the UK in 1998 with Phil Cuthbert playing bass and keyboards. Following the tour, Cuthbert left the group to pursue a solo career, at which point Burgess took over on bass, and Danny Ashberry was recruited to fill the keyboard-backing vocal role. After several concerts, Walker was replaced by drummer Craig Barrie. Upon the album's release in 1999, Invincible embarked on a UK tour, before the band disintegrated.

In 2000, the Chameleons reunited with all four original members, originally for several live performances in England. They eventually added Ghana-born percussionist-vocalist Kwasi Asante, releasing several live albums and one new studio recording, Why Call It Anything (2001), and toured North America, before an acrimonious break-up in early 2003.

Burgess and Altana next formed the band Bird, initially with Barrie on drums (supporting New Model Army on their UK tour). In 2006, they enlisted drummer Achim Faerber, playing a selection of Invincible and Chameleons songs interwoven with a selection of new material. In November 2006, Bird played a short set at the Middleton Civic Hall in Manchester as part of a benefit concert for lighting technician and ex-Chameleons live keyboardist Andy Moore, who had been diagnosed with a brain tumour while touring with Jamie Cullum. Moore died one year later, in November 2007.

In 2007, Burgess joined with Jack Sobel and John Kolbeck, formerly of the Messengers, to form Black Swan Lane. Augmented by former Burgess bandmates Altana and Faerber, Asante, and guest vocalist Anna-Lynne Williams (Trespassers William), they soon recorded A Long Way from Home, issued on Eden Records. One of the album tracks, "In the Ether", was later featured in 2009 film Adventureland.

In November 2008, Burgess, Sobel, Clegg and Whitaker performed a one-off concert as the Sun and the Moon in Atlanta, Georgia, US. During the rehearsals for this show, Clegg and Whitaker became involved in the writing and recording of the second Black Swan Lane album, The Sun and the Moon Sessions. Asante and Burgess friend Jimmy Oakes also contributed to the album, issued in June 2009.

In 2007, a Burgess autobiography, View from a Hill, was published by the independent Guardian Angel press. In April 2015, it was reprinted in a re-edited and revised "definitive" edition by Mittens On.

In November 2009, a five-song EP with producer Pocket was released, featuring two songs, "A Force of Nature" and "Heaven," with lyrics and lead vocals by Burgess. In 2009, Burgess reunited with Lever under the name ChameleonsVox, performing and touring Chameleons back catalogue material.

As ChameleonsVox, Burgess toured Europe and the United States from 2009 to 2014, performing acoustic and full band shows with varying backing musicians, including Lever. They issued an EP, M+D=1(8), in November 2013, prior to Lever's departure. Lever died in 2017.

A ChameleonsVox line-up featuring Burgess and Altana with Neil Dwerryhouse and Chris Oliver on guitars embarked on a "We Are All Chameleons Farewell Tour" in the US in 2015.

In 2016, Burgess contributed guest vocals to "On the Inside", a track from the album Choke by US post-punk band Soft Kill.

In 2017 and 2018 ChameleonsVox continued to tour with concerts throughout Europe and America; their latest concerts have centred on the songs from one of their three studio albums.

In 2025, Burgess announced that he prefers to be called Vox and planned to perhaps change his name to Vox legally, stating "My reasons for this are deeply personal. I spent a long time thinking about it and for me it's the right thing to do".

== Discography ==
Solo

- 1993 Zima Junction (as Mark Burgess & the Sons of God; Imaginary)
- 1994 Manchester 1993 (as Mark Burgess & the Sons of God; Pivot)
- 1994 Spring Blooms Tra-La (as Mark Burgess & the Sons of God; Indigo)
- 1995 Paradyning (with Yves Altana; Dead Dead Good)
- 2002 Paradyning Live in Frankfurt '96 (with Yves Altana; Alchemized)
- 2004 Magic Boomerang (compilation including rare material; Indigo)
- 2009 A Force of Nature EP (collaboration with Pocket)

with the Sun and the Moon

- 1988 The Sun and the Moon (Geffen)
- 1999 The Great Escape (reissue of The Sun and the Moon with bonus singles)

with Invincible

- 1999 Venus (Gethsemene)
- 2002 Black and Blue (Alchemized)

with Black Swan Lane

- 2007 A Long Way from Home (Eden Records)
- 2009 The Sun and the Moon Sessions (Eden Records)
- 2010 Things You Know and Love (Eden Records)
- 2011 Staring Down the Path of Sound (Eden Records)
- 2013 The Last Time in Your Light (Eden Records)
- 2014 A Moment of Happiness (Eden Records)
- 2017 Under My Fallen Sky (Eden Records)
- 2019 Vita Eterna (Eden Records)
