= Mirror Man (Captain Beefheart album) =

Studio album by Captain Beefheart and His Magic Band
- Released: April 1971
- Recorded: October–November 1967
- Studio: TTG, Hollywood
- Genre: Blues-rock; blues
- Length: 52:51
- Label: Buddah
- Producer: Bob Krasnow

Captain Beefheart and His Magic Band chronology
Lick My Decals Off, Baby (1970)	Mirror Man (1971)	The Spotlight Kid (1972)

Mirror Man is the fifth studio album by American band Captain Beefheart and His Magic Band, released in April 1971 by Buddah Records. It contains material that was recorded for the label in 1967 and originally intended for release as part of an abandoned project entitled It Comes to You in a Plain Brown Wrapper. Much of the material from this project was subsequently re-recorded and released through a different label as Strictly Personal (1968). The tapes from the original sessions, however, remained under the care of Buddah, who took four of the unissued tunes and released them as Mirror Man. The album sleeve features an erroneous claim that it had been "recorded one night in Los Angeles in 1965".

The album is dominated by three long, blues-rooted jams featuring uncharacteristically sparse lyrical accompaniment from Beefheart. A fourth tune, the eight-minute "Kandy Korn", is an earlier version of a track that appears on Strictly Personal. In 1999, Buddha Records issued an expanded version of the album entitled The Mirror Man Sessions, which features five additional tracks taken from the abandoned tapes.

== History ==
When the band went into the studio in late 1967 to record the follow-up to their debut album Safe as Milk, which had been released earlier that year, it was with the intention of producing a double album, provisionally entitled It Comes to You in a Plain Brown Wrapper. The intention, according to drummer John French, was for one disc of the LP to consist of structured studio tracks by Captain Beefheart and the Magic Band, while the other disc would consist of unstructured blues jams by The 25th Century Quakers, an alter-ego version of the group (who were to perform live in Quaker costumes as an opening act during the band's concerts – this never came to pass, although a Quaker hat features on the cover of Trout Mask Replica). Three of the latter tracks—"Tarotplane", "25th Century Quaker", and "Mirror Man"—were long, psychedelic blues jams performed 'live in the studio' (in one take with no overdubs). The band was also working on a number of other tracks, many of which would eventually be included on Strictly Personal (1968). These songs were characterized by their polyrhythmic structures and psychedelic themes, which marked a progression from the band's previous blues-rooted work on Safe as Milk.

The Brown Wrapper concept, however, was at some point abandoned by Buddah, who kept the recordings and left some of the tracks from the sessions unfinished and without any vocals. The reason for this remains unclear, though Beefheart biographer Mike Barnes suggests it was probably because the band's record label, Buddah, simply lost interest. A number of the abandoned tracks were re-recorded in 1968, and released as Strictly Personal, through producer Bob Krasnow's own record label, Blue Thumb. The original session tapes, however, which included the three long blues jams along with a number of other unreleased songs, remained the property of Buddah, who released Mirror Man in May 1971, compiling the track list from the three 'live' jams and a finished version of "Kandy Korn" (which was one of the tracks re-recorded for Strictly Personal, where it appears in shortened form). The album's original pressing was put together somewhat carelessly, with the cover art featured a shot of the band's 1970 line-up. Later pressings replaced this photo with a more striking image of Van Vliet (Beefheart) wearing a top hat. Other unreleased tracks from the original sessions were released in later reissues, including 1999's The Mirror Man Sessions.

== Music and lyrics ==
The opening track, "Tarotplane", takes its title after the Robert Johnson song "Terraplane Blues", which was about a popular 1930s car. Throughout "Tarotplane"'s nineteen minutes, Van Vliet quotes lines from Johnson's song as well as from various other blues tunes including Blind Willie Johnson's "You're Gonna Need Somebody on Your Bond", Son House's "Grinning in Your Face", and Willie Dixon's "Wang Dang Doodle". The song is built on a single two-chord blues riff, and also features an appearance by Van Vliet on an Indian reed instrument called a shehnai, which was supposedly given to him by Ornette Coleman, and which he plays in a different key from the rest of the band.

Also on side one is the eight-minute "Kandy Korn", the second Magic Band tune to reference confectionery, following Safe as Milk's "Abba Zaba". A different, shorter version of this song appears as the closing track on Strictly Personal, where the production buries the later sections of the song under a profusion of backwards cymbals. Here, the track is heard without Krasnow's controversial production effects.

The second long "live" blues jam, "25th Century Quaker", owes its surreal lyrics more to the psychedelic mood of the time, with its references to "blue cheese faces" and "eyes that flutter like a wide-open shutter." Around the time the song was recorded the band had been wearing black Quaker coats on stage, and even began to play their live shows as The 25th Century Quakers.

The album closes with its fifteen-minute title track; an AllMusic review of the album cites "Mirror Man" as "one of the key tracks of Beefheart's entire career", adding, "Probably the catchiest tune Beefheart ever wrote, 'Mirror Man' has an almost funky, hip-swaying groove." Drummer John French notes, "This is the session in which I was told afterwards I had been given LSD in my tea by someone. Actually, it must have been a rather small amount, because I didn't find myself too far from reality." Like "Kandy Korn", it was re-recorded for Strictly Personal, where it appears as "Son of Mirror Man – Mere Man".

== Critical and popular reception ==
Professional ratings
Review scores
Source	Rating
AllMusic	3.5/5 stars

Reviews of the album have made much of the length of its four compositions. A contemporary review written for Rolling Stone by Lester Bangs, who opens by citing Beefheart as "one of the four or five unqualified geniuses to rise from the hothouses of American music in the Sixties", states: "None of them really build in intensity or end up anyplace other than where they started, and would most likely prove intolerable to anyone already a bit put off by Beefheart's work." Mike Barnes suggests the lengths are partly justified by other bands' long blues compositions of the period, such as the nineteen-minute "Revelation" from Love's Da Capo (1966), or the eleven-minute "Alligator" from the Grateful Dead's Anthem of the Sun (1968). Bangs, too, goes on to say, "If all those millions settled for Cream throttling 'Spoonful' for 16 minutes, their attention spans shouldn't have any trouble with this, which is not only better blues jamming but actually has more variety." The album reached a peak UK chart position of number 49, although, like all other Magic Band releases, it failed to break into the top 100 in the United States.

== Track listing ==
=== Original LP ===
All tracks written by Don Van Vliet and published by Flamingo Music.

Side one
No.	Title	Length
1.	"Tarotplane"	19:08
2.	"Kandy Korn"	8:07

Side two
No.	Title	Length
1.	"25th Century Quaker"	9:50
2.	"Mirror Man"	15:46

=== The Mirror Man Sessions ===
In 1999, Buddha Records (which had renamed itself to correct the earlier misspelling, 'Buddah') reissued the album under the title The Mirror Man Sessions, which was released with a newly expanded track list and a 12-page booklet explaining the history of the recordings. The additional tracks included on this release are also taken from the abandoned Brown Wrapper sessions, and thus yield a track listing which is somewhat closer to the original concept. Other tracks from these sessions are included as bonus material on Buddha's 1999 issue of Safe as Milk.

No.	Title	Length
1.	"Tarotplane"	19:08
2.	"25th Century Quaker"	9:50
3.	"Mirror Man"	15:46
4.	"Kandy Korn"	8:06
5.	"Trust Us" (Take 6)	7:14
6.	"Safe as Milk" (Take 12)	5:00
7.	"Beatle Bones n' Smokin' Stones"	3:11
8.	"Moody Liz" (Take 8)	4:32
9.	"Gimme Dat Harp Boy"	3:32

== Personnel ==
- Captain Beefheart – vocals, harmonica, oboe
- Alex St. Clair Snouffer – guitar
- Jerry Handley – bass
- John French – drums
- Jeff Cotton – guitar

Additional personnel

- Mark Marcellino – keyboards
