= Electricity (Captain Beefheart song) =

Single by Captain Beefheart and his Magic Band

from the album Safe as Milk
- A-side: "Sure 'Nuff 'n Yes I Do"
- Released: 1967, 1978
- Genre: Blues rock; psychedelic rock; garage rock; proto-punk
- Length: 3:07
- Label: Buddah
- Songwriter(s): Herb Bermann and Don Van Vliet

Captain Beefheart and his Magic Band singles chronology
"Hard Workin' Man" (1978)	"Electricity" (1967)	"Ice Cream For Crow" (1982)

"Electricity" is a song by Captain Beefheart and his Magic Band, from their 1967 debut album Safe as Milk. Beefheart claimed that A&M Records dropped the band after co-owner Jerry Moss heard the song and declared it "too negative" for his teenage daughter to listen to; Safe as Milk would ultimately be released by Buddah Records. Beefheart's vocal performance shattered the microphone recording him.

== Critical reception ==
"Electricity"
While Safe as Milk mostly conveyed a blues–rock sound, songs such as "Electricity" illustrated the band's unconventional instrumentation and Van Vliet's unusual vocals.

Critics have said the song foreshadows many of Beefheart's later efforts and praised the song's distorted vocals. Magic Band member Guitarist Doug Moon described the song as "hinting of things to come." Critics also described the theremin in the song as a "ghostly theremin in the most disconcerting way." In the book Riot on Sunset Strip: Rock 'n' Roll's Last Stand in Hollywood, "Electricity" is said to be "a very unconventional blues song".

== History ==
While playing "Electricity" at the Fantasy Fair and Magic Mountain Music Festival at Mount Tamalpais in 1967, in a warm-up performance for the Monterey International Pop Festival, Captain Beefheart abruptly stopped the song, straightened his tie, and walked off the stage, landing face-first in the grass. He later claimed that he saw a girl in the audience turn into a goldfish. This incident caused guitarist Ry Cooder, frustrated with Beefheart's erratic behavior, to immediately quit the Magic Band; Cooder's departure brought about the cancellation of their scheduled appearance at Monterey Pop.

== Covers ==
Sonic Youth recorded a cover of "Electricity" for the tribute album Fast 'n' Bulbous – A Tribute to Captain Beefheart. This version would later appear on the 2007 deluxe reissue of their 1988 album Daydream Nation.

American post-hardcore band Racebannon covered the song on their 2002 album In the Grips of the Light.
