= Daydream Nation =

1988 studio album by Sonic Youth

Studio album by Sonic Youth
- Released: October 18, 1988
- Recorded: July–August 1988
- Studio: Greene St. Recording (SoHo, Manhattan)
- Genres: Noise rock; indie rock; art punk; avant rock; art rock; post-punk
- Length: 70:47
- Label: Enigma
- Producers: Sonic Youth; Nick Sansano

Sonic Youth chronology
Sister (1987)	Daydream Nation (1988)	The Whitey Album (1989)

Singles from Daydream Nation
- 1. "Teen Age Riot" Released: October 1988; 2. "Silver Rocket" Released: 1988; 3. "Candle" Released: October 1989; 4. "Providence" Released: 1989

Daydream Nation is the fifth studio album by the American alternative rock band Sonic Youth, released on October 18, 1988. The band recorded the album between July and August 1988 at Greene St. Recording in New York City, and it was released by Enigma Records as a double album. It would be the band's only release on Enigma, as they would sign with DGC Records for their next album.

After the release of Sister (1987), the band had left SST Records over dissatisfaction with payments, distribution, and the label's administrative practices. Daydream Nation represented a move towards longer songs emblematic of the band's live improvisations. This, in addition to Thurston Moore writing unusually prolifically, would result in the band's first double album.

Pulling from pop culture sources such as William Gibson and Joni Mitchell, the album combines long improvisations, excursions into noise, and faster, poppier melodies, completing the band's evolution that had begun on EVOL (1986). This new direction is exemplified on the opening track, "Teen Age Riot", one of the band's most popular songs.

After Daydream Nation was released, it received widespread acclaim from critics and earned Sonic Youth a major label deal. The album was ranked high in critics' year-end lists of 1988's best records, being voted second in The Village Voice's annual Pazz & Jop poll. Daydream Nation has since been widely considered to be Sonic Youth's magnum opus, as well as one of the greatest albums of all time, specifically having a profound influence on the alternative and indie rock genres. It was chosen by the Library of Congress to be preserved in the National Recording Registry in 2005.

== Background ==
By the release of Sonic Youth's fourth album, Sister, the band had become one of the most acclaimed acts in the American underground, with Sister and their third album, EVOL being rated highly by critics. However, despite this success with their last two albums on the label, the band would decide to leave SST Records, expressing concerns about payments and administrative practices within the label. The band decided to sign with Geffen Records instead, which was distributed by Capitol Records and partly owned by EMI.

== Writing and recording ==
Sonic Youth's standard songwriting method involved Thurston Moore bringing in melody ideas and chord changes that the band would spend several months fashioning into full-length songs. Instead of paring the songs down as the group did with previous records, the months-long writing process for Daydream Nation resulted in long improvisations, some lasting over half an hour. Several friends of the band, including Henry Rollins, had praised the band's long live improvisations and told the group that its records never captured them. With Moore writing prolifically, the album ultimately had to be expanded to a double album.

Sonic Youth recorded Daydream Nation at Greene St. Recording in Manhattan. The studio's engineer, Nick Sansano, was accustomed to working with hip-hop artists; he did not know much about Sonic Youth, but he was aware they had an aggressive sound, so he showed the band members his work on Public Enemy's "Black Steel in the Hour of Chaos" and Rob Base & DJ E-Z Rock's "It Takes Two", which they appreciated. Sonic Youth booked three weeks of recording time at Greene Street's Studio A starting in mid-July 1988. The band paid $1,000 (equivalent to $2,722 in 2025) per day of studio time, which was the most they had paid to record an album up to that point.

Due to the amount of preparation the band put into composing, the recording process was efficient. The sessions became rushed near the end when Paul Smith, the head of the band's British label Blast First, set a mastering date of August 18. As a result of the time pressure, Kim Gordon was not happy with some of her vocal takes. The band spent a whole night creating a final mix for the three-song suite "Trilogy" so it could be mastered the following morning. The record ultimately cost $30,000 (equivalent to $81,669 in 2025), which led Moore to refer to it as "our first non-econo record".

== Music and lyrics ==
Daydream Nation is notable for its unorthodox guitar tuning and song structure, with many songs concluding with lengthy instrumental sections. The album is especially notable for being a significant influence for later alternative and indie rock efforts and genres, including well-known grunge band Nirvana. Lyrics include topics of burnout, the music industry, and the crack epidemic of the late 1980s.

"The Sprawl" was inspired by science fiction writer William Gibson's Sprawl trilogy, while the lyrics for the first verse were lifted from the novel The Stars at Noon by Denis Johnson. "'Cross the Breeze" features some of Gordon's most intense singing, with such lyrics as "Let's go walking on the water/Now you think I'm Satan's daughter/I wanna know, should I stay or go?/I took a look into your hate/It made me feel very up to date". "Eric's Trip" is inspired by Eric Emerson's LSD-fueled monologue in the Andy Warhol movie Chelsea Girls.

"Hey Joni" is titled as a tribute to rock standard "Hey Joe" and to Canadian singer-songwriter Joni Mitchell. It is sung by Ranaldo, and has surrealist lyrics such as "Shots ring out from the center of an empty field/Joni's in the tall grass/She's a beautiful mental jukebox, a sailboat explosion/A snap of electric whipcrack". This song also alludes to Gibson's Neuromancer with the line "In this broken town, can you still jack in/And know what to do?" These feature similarly on Ranaldo's "Rain King", an homage to Pere Ubu and possibly to Saul Bellow's novel Henderson the Rain King.

"Providence" consists of a piano solo by Moore recorded at his mother's house using a Walkman, the sound of a Peavey Roadmaster amplifier overheating, and a pair of telephone messages left for Moore by Mike Watt from a Providence, Rhode Island, payphone.

The title of "The Wonder" comes from crime fiction writer James Ellroy's phrase about the ineffable mystery at the heart of Los Angeles; in Moore's words, "the wonder" is what "for better and worse, inspires [Ellroy] to keep going, to get out of bed every day." The closing track "Eliminator Jr." was inspired by the "Preppie Killer", Robert Chambers. It was thus titled because the band felt it sounded like a cross between Dinosaur Jr. and Eliminator-era ZZ Top. It was given part "z" in the "Trilogy" both as a reference to ZZ Top and because it closes the album.

== Title and packaging ==
Similar to Led Zeppelin, Sonic Youth employed insignia imagery to represent its four members on Daydream Nation.

Daydream Nation's title came from a lyric in the song "Hyperstation". Sonic Youth had also considered the title Tonight's the Day, from a lyric in "Candle", which made reference to Neil Young's 1975 album Tonight's the Night. The cover for Daydream Nation features the 1983 Gerhard Richter painting Kerze ("Candle"). The back cover art is a similar Richter painting from 1982. The LP's four sides and the compact disc inner tray contain four symbols each representing one of the members of the band, in an homage to—and parody of—the four symbols from the fourth Led Zeppelin album: infinity (∞) for Ranaldo (referencing his 1987 album From Here to Infinity), female (♀) for Gordon, uppercase omega (Ω) for Moore (referencing Leo, his zodiac sign), and a drawing of a demonic–angelic baby holding drumsticks for Shelley.

== Release and promotion ==
Daydream Nation was released on October 18, 1988, in compact disc, cassette, and double vinyl formats. It did not chart in the United States, but reached No. 99 on the British albums chart. Three singles with accompanying music videos were also released: "Teen Age Riot" (in 1988 on 12-inch vinyl and CD), "Providence" (in the United Kingdom in 1989), "Candle" (October 1989 on 12-inch vinyl), and a live version of "Silver Rocket" for subscribers to Forced Exposure. The song "Teen Age Riot" was popular on alternative radio and reached No. 20 on Billboard's newly created Modern Rock Tracks chart. Sonic Youth also promoted the album with a North American tour from October to December 1988, concentrating almost exclusively on material from the album. In 1989, they took the tour to New Zealand, Australia, Japan, the USSR and Europe, finishing the year with their first network television appearance—on the syndicated Night Music—playing "Silver Rocket". In 2007 they played the entire album live as part of the Don't Look Back concert series, and then toured with it through Europe and Australia into 2008.

== Reception ==
Retrospective professional ratings
Review scores
Source	Rating
AllMusic	5/5 stars
Blender	5/5 stars
Chicago Tribune	4/4 stars
The Guardian	5/5 stars
Pitchfork	10/10
Rolling Stone	5/5 stars
The Rolling Stone Album Guide	5/5 stars
Spin	5/5 stars
Spin Alternative Record Guide	10/10
Uncut	5/5 stars

Daydream Nation received overwhelming acclaim from contemporary critics. Billboard called it "the supreme fulfillment" of Sonic Youth's "fullbore technique". Giving the album an "A" grade in The Village Voice, Robert Christgau believed that while the band were embracing a "happy-go-lucky careerism and four-on-the-floor maturity", their relentlessly discordant music was "a philosophical triumph". Rolling Stone's Robert Palmer rated it three-and-a-half stars out of five and said it demonstrated "the broad harmonic palette, sharply honed songwriting skills and sheer exhilarating drive" of the "influential quartet", while presenting "the definitive American guitar band of the Eighties at the height of its powers and prescience".

The British music press also embraced Daydream Nation: Q magazine said the record made an "enthralling noise"; the NME called it the "most radical and political album of the year" and awarded it a maximum score of ten; and Record Mirror gave it a five-out-of-five rating, enthusing that Sonic Youth were "the best band in the universe".

At the end of 1988, Daydream Nation appeared in several lists of the year's best albums, being ranked at No. 2 by Rolling Stone, No. 1 by CMJ, and No. 9 by NME. It was also voted the year's second best record in The Village Voice's annual Pazz & Jop poll, which made the band realize that the album had made an impact. Christgau, the poll's creator and supervisor, named it the fourth best album of 1988 in his own list.

== Legacy ==
Daydream Nation has continued to earn acclaim and accolades. According to Matthew Stearns, writer of the 33⅓ book dedicated to the album, it has been "resoundingly canonized as a breakthrough landmark in the chronicles of avant-rock expression". Stearns felt that Daydream Nation was part of a "Holy Trinity" of early American indie rock double albums alongside Hüsker Dü's Zen Arcade and Minutemen's Double Nickels on the Dime, which "together mark a period of unprecedented creative expansion in terms of the possibilities of underground (or otherwise) American rock music".

In a retrospective review for AllMusic, Stephen Thomas Erlewine deemed it "a masterpiece of post-punk art rock" that demonstrated the degree of which "noise and self-conscious avant art can be incorporated into rock, and the results are nothing short of stunning". In 1994, Jon Matsumoto of the Los Angeles Times called it the band's masterpiece, marking the point where they developed the songwriting skills to complement their penchant for dissonant instrumentation.

Greg Kot, writing in the Chicago Tribune, called it one of the most recognizable albums of the 1980s, with its combination of "hypnotic guitar jams and some of the band's best, straight-ahead tunes". Reviewing the 2007 deluxe edition, Christgau credited Daydream Nation for making alternative rock "a life force" and remarked that, along with the "vital" bonus disc, the album remained an honest and thrilling listen because of the band's non-standard tunings and anthemic songs about post-irony and "confusion-as-sex". In Spin, Will Hermes said it was perhaps "the greatest art-punk statement ever", while John Mulvey from Uncut called it an "avant-rock masterpiece" that was still radical. Less favorably, Chuck Eddy described it as "two discs of good Hawkwind, with an I Ching groove sleek enough to send your cow jumping over the moon, but most of it's watery wallpaper regardless."

In 2002, Pitchfork ranked Daydream Nation No. 1 on its list of the 100 greatest albums of the 1980s; it dropped to No. 7 in the website's updated 2018 list. It also placed at No.13 on Spin magazine's list of the 100 greatest albums from 1985 to 2010, No. 30 on Slant Magazine's "Best Albums of the 1980s" and No. 45 on the Rolling Stone list of the 100 greatest albums of the 1980s. The Spin Alternative Record Guide (1995) named it the ninth best alternative album, and it was ranked 11th on Guitarist's 2000 list of the 101 essential guitar records. The album was placed at No. 328 on the 2003 and 2012 editions of Rolling Stone's 500 Greatest Albums of All Time, and was promoted to No. 171 in the 2020 edition.

Daydream Nation was one of 50 recordings chosen by the United States Library of Congress to be added to the National Recording Registry in 2006. PopMatters included it in their list of the "12 Essential 1980s Alternative Rock Albums", saying it was "an ambitious double album that saw Sonic Youth's various influences coalescing into a striking, searing whole". The album was also included in the book 1001 Albums You Must Hear Before You Die. David Bowie called it "an extraordinary album."

Amy Phillips of Pitchfork wrote in 2018: "Thirty years after its release, Sonic Youth’s double-album magnum opus remains the defining document of American indie rock. Never before or after would this band—or any other—synthesize the urgency of punk, the abrasion of noise, and the beauty of pop into such a monumental whole. ... The DNA of everything that came before, and everything that came after, is encoded in this album." In 2020, Adrien Begrand of PopMatters wrote: "From the beautiful Gerhard Richter painting on the album cover to the alternately melodic and atonal music therein, this was a 'music as high art' statement on the level of The Velvet Underground and Nico 21 years earlier. ... Nirvana's Nevermind would burst the alternative rock dam wide open three years later, but as far as influence goes Daydream Nation was just as seismic, not to mention the superior album in the long run."

== Track listing ==
All tracks are written by Sonic Youth (Thurston Moore, Kim Gordon, Lee Ranaldo, and Steve Shelley).

Side one
No.	Title	Vocals	Length
1.	"Teen Age Riot"	Gordon, Moore	6:57
2.	"Silver Rocket"	Moore	3:47
3.	"The Sprawl"	Gordon	7:42
Total length:			18:26

Side two
No.	Title	Vocals	Length
4.	"'Cross the Breeze"	Gordon	7:00
5.	"Eric's Trip"	Ranaldo	3:48
6.	"Total Trash"	Moore	7:33
Total length:			18:21

Side three
No.	Title	Vocals	Length
7.	"Hey Joni"	Ranaldo	4:23
8.	"Providence"	Mike Watt	2:41
9.	"Candle"	Moore	4:58
10.	"Rain King"	Ranaldo	4:39
Total length:			16:41

Side four
No.	Title	Vocals	Length
11.	"Kissability"	Gordon	3:08
12.	"Trilogy": a) "The Wonder"; b) "Hyperstation"; z) "Eliminator Jr."	Moore, Gordon: Moore; Moore; Gordon	14:07: 4:16; 7:13; 2:38
Total length:			17:15

- On some editions of the album, including all digital releases, all parts of “Trilogy” are separated as their own tracks.

=== Deluxe Edition ===
A deluxe edition of Daydream Nation was released in 2007, containing live versions of every track on the album, plus studio recordings of some cover songs. A 4-LP vinyl version was released on July 17, 2007.

The four-LP vinyl release of the deluxe edition has a slightly different track listing than the CD release. The first two LPs have the same track listing as the original double-LP release. However, the home demo of "Eric's Trip" is at the end of the fourth LP, rather than falling immediately after the original album.

Deluxe Edition track listing
No.	Title	Length
1.	"Teen Age Riot"	6:57
2.	"Silver Rocket"	3:47
3.	"The Sprawl"	7:42
4.	"'Cross the Breeze"	7:00
5.	"Eric's Trip"	3:48
6.	"Total Trash"	7:33
7.	"Hey Joni"	4:23
8.	"Providence"	2:41
9.	"Candle"	4:58
10.	"Rain King"	4:39
11.	"Kissability"	3:08
12.	"Trilogy: The Wonder"	4:15
13.	"Trilogy: Hyperstation"	7:13
14.	"Trilogy: Eliminator Jr."	2:37
15.	"Eric's Trip (Home Demo)"	2:27

Deluxe Edition bonus disc
No.	Title	Writer(s)	Length
1.	"The Sprawl" (Noise Now Festival, Philipshalle, Düsseldorf on March 27, 1989)		8:27
2.	"'Cross the Breeze" (Noise Now Festival, Philipshalle, Düsseldorf on March 27, 1989)		5:54
3.	"Hey Joni" (Paradiso, Amsterdam on March 26, 1989)		3:38
4.	"Silver Rocket" (Noise Now Festival, Philipshalle, Düsseldorf on March 27, 1989)		4:19
5.	"Kissability" (Recorded for the documentary Put Blood in the Music in Brooklyn, New York in August 1988)		2:19
6.	"Eric's Trip" (Noise Now Festival, Philipshalle, Düsseldorf on March 27, 1989)		3:05
7.	"Candle" (Cabaret Metro, Chicago on November 5, 1988)		5:04
8.	"The Wonder" (Recorded at CBGB on December 13, 1988)		4:02
9.	"Hyperstation" (Recorded at CBGB on December 13, 1988)		6:14
10.	"Eliminator Jr." (Paradiso, Amsterdam on March 26, 1989)		2:38
11.	"Providence" (Paradiso, Amsterdam on March 26, 1989)		1:47
12.	"Teen Age Riot" (Paradiso, Amsterdam on March 26, 1989)		4:37
13.	"Rain King" (Recorded for the documentary Put Blood in the Music in Brooklyn, New York in August 1988)		4:06
14.	"Totally Trashed" (Maxwell's, Hoboken, New Jersey on June 9, 1988)		1:57
15.	"Total Trash" (Maxwell's, Hoboken, New Jersey on June 9, 1988)		5:18
16.	"Within You Without You" (The Beatles cover, Sgt. Pepper Knew My Father compilation, 1988)	George Harrison	4:58
17.	"Touch Me I'm Sick" (Mudhoney cover, split 7-inch with Mudhoney, Sub Pop Singles Club, December 1988)	Mudhoney	2:33
18.	"Computer Age" (Neil Young cover, The Bridge: A Tribute to Neil Young compilation, 1989)	Young	5:12
19.	"Electricity" (Captain Beefheart cover, Fast 'n' Bulbous – A Tribute to Captain Beefheart compilation, 1988)	Don Van Vliet, Herb Bermann	2:46

== Personnel ==
=== Sonic Youth ===
- Thurston Moore – guitar, vocals, piano, production
- Kim Gordon – bass guitar, guitar, vocals, production
- Lee Ranaldo – guitar, vocals, production
- Steve Shelley – drums, production

=== Production ===
- Nick Sansano – production, engineering
- Howie Weinberg – mastering
- Dave Swanson – engineering assistance
- Michael Lavine – photography
- Matt Tritto – engineering assistance

== Charts ==
Chart (1988)	Peak position
British Albums Chart	99
Chart (2007)	Peak position
Belgian Albums Chart (Vl)	91

== Bibliography ==
- Azerrad, Michael (2001). Our Band Could Be Your Life. Little, Brown. ISBN 0-316-78753-1.
- Browne, David (2008). Goodbye 20th Century: A Biography of Sonic Youth. Da Capo. ISBN 978-0-306-81515-7.
- Stearns, Matthew (2007). Daydream Nation. 33⅓. Continuum. ISBN 978-0-8264-1740-4.
