= Strictly Personal =

Studio album by Captain Beefheart and His Magic Band
- Released: October 1968
- Recorded: April 25 – May 2, 1968
- Studio: Sunset Sound Recorders, Hollywood, California
- Genre: Blues; psychedelia; blues rock
- Length: 38:57
- Label: Blue Thumb
- Producer: Bob Krasnow

Captain Beefheart and His Magic Band chronology
Safe as Milk (1967)	Strictly Personal (1968)	Trout Mask Replica (1969)

Strictly Personal is the second album by Captain Beefheart and His Magic Band. It was originally released in October 1968 as the first album on the Blue Thumb Records label. It was composed primarily of material that had been previously recorded for an aborted double-LP entitled It Comes to You in a Plain Brown Wrapper. Those recordings were shelved by Buddah Records, and the band were forced to hastily re-record that material months later for Blue Thumb.

Producer Bob Krasnow added phasing and reverberation effects to the recordings, which were later disavowed by Beefheart. These effects have since been the topic of much discussion among music fans and critics. Alternate recordings from the original Buddah sessions were released on 1971's Mirror Man and 1999's The Mirror Man Sessions, as well as the deluxe reissue of Safe as Milk.

== History ==
The original intention was to record a double album for Buddah Records titled It Comes to You in a Plain Brown Wrapper (Strictly Personal's sleeve design is a relic of this initial concept). A considerable amount of material was recorded for the project during the period of October–November 1967 with Krasnow producing. The intention, according to drummer John French, was for one disc of the LP to consist of structured studio tracks by Captain Beefheart and the Magic Band, while the second disc would consist of unstructured blues jams by The 25th Century Quakers, an alter-ego version of the group (who would perform live in Quaker costumes as an opening act during the band's concerts, although this never came to pass). Buddah, however, declined to release the album and kept the original recordings. Strictly Personal features re-recorded versions of songs from the 1967 sessions, during subsequent sessions in which the band was less well-rehearsed.

While the band traveled to Europe to promote the UK release of Safe as Milk, Krasnow mixed the tapes alone. His heavy use of phasing and reverberation during mixing was done in accordance with the popular psychedelic rock trends of the day. Beefheart subsequently condemned the production. He said the effects were added without his knowledge or approval. These comments became public only after sales of the album failed to reach expectations. It has been claimed by other band members that he initially agreed to the use of these sounds. Regardless, Beefheart did release his later recordings with a much more basic and unprocessed sound.

Buddah eventually released some recordings from the earlier sessions, along with an earlier version of "Kandy Korn", as Mirror Man in 1971. Much other material from the 1967 sessions has since been released: the compilation I May Be Hungry but I Sure Ain't Weird (1992) contained eleven of the original cuts taken from master tapes. This album has long since been out of print, but all eleven tracks can be found spread across The Mirror Man Sessions and the current version of Safe as Milk. Some of these tracks were also used for a vinyl-only release by the Sundazed label in 2008 bearing the original intended title of It Comes to You in a Plain Brown Wrapper but this release does not duplicate the original album's concept or sequence.

== Reception ==
Professional ratings
Review scores
Source	Rating
AllMusic	4/5 stars

Barret Hansen, in a December 1968 review for Rolling Stone, was unsure of the value of the record; he felt that Beefheart and his band had "the capability of making the ultimate white blues album", but that the "noisy, discom-bobulated freakout shit" and "liquid audio" spoil the potential, so that it was unclear to him if the album was the work of "the world's greatest white bluesman", "a competent musician, capable of occasional titanic moments", or "a hack performer" with genius production.

Stewart Mason, in a retrospective AllMusic review, felt it was a terrific album but underrated due to the reputation of Bob Krasnow's remixing; although he did feel that the "sound effects and phasing do detract from the album at points".

It was voted number 661 in Colin Larkin's All Time Top 1000 Albums, 3rd Edition (2000).

== Track listing ==
All tracks are written by Don Van Vliet.

Side one
No.	Title	Length
1.	"Ah Feel Like Ahcid"	3:05
2.	"Safe as Milk"	5:27
3.	"Trust Us"	8:09
4.	"Son of Mirror Man - Mere Man"	5:20
Total length:		22:01

Side two
No.	Title	Length
1.	"On Tomorrow"	3:27
2.	"Beatle Bones 'n' Smokin' Stones"	3:18
3.	"Gimme Dat Harp Boy"	5:05
4.	"Kandy Korn"	5:06
Total length:		16:56 38:57

According to the album credits, all songs were written by Don Van Vliet. Lyricist Herb Bermann has contested this, claiming to have written the lyrics to the songs "Safe as Milk", "Trust Us", "Gimme Dat Harp Boy" and "Kandy Korn"

== Personnel ==
- Don Van Vliet – vocals, harmonica
- Alex St. Clair – guitar
- Jeff Cotton – guitar
- Jerry Handley – bass
- John French – drums
