= The Spotlight Kid =

Studio album by Captain Beefheart
- Released: January 1972
- Recorded: Autumn 1971
- Genre: Art rock; blues rock
- Length: 35:54
- Label: Reprise
- Producer: Captain Beefheart, Phil Schier

Captain Beefheart chronology
Mirror Man (1971)	The Spotlight Kid (1972)	Clear Spot (1972)

The Spotlight Kid is the sixth studio album by Captain Beefheart. Released in 1972, it is the only album credited solely to Captain Beefheart (Don Van Vliet) rather than Captain Beefheart and His Magic Band, although every member is featured, and its material is considered part of the band's repertoire. Often cited as one of the most accessible of Beefheart's albums, it is solidly founded in the blues but also uses instruments such as marimba and jingle bells that are not typical of that genre. The incarnation of the Magic Band on this album was Bill Harkleroad and Elliot Ingber, guitars; Mark Boston, bass; John French, drums; and Art Tripp, marimba. Session drummer Rhys Clark substituted for French on one track, "Glider".

== Recording ==
In the period leading up to the recording the band lived communally, first at a compound near Ben Lomond, California, and then in northern California near Trinidad. The situation saw a return to the physical violence and psychological manipulation that had taken place during the band's previous communal residence while composing and rehearsing Trout Mask Replica. According to John French, the worst of this was directed toward Harkleroad. In his autobiography Harkleroad recalled being thrown into a dumpster, an act he interpreted as having metaphorical intent.

During the recording sessions the band recorded several compositions that did not appear on the released album. "Well, Well, Well", with Mark Boston on vocals, was the only one that was completed. The rest were sketches or early versions of songs, some of which were recorded and released on later albums. "Suzy Murder Wrist" was later completed as "Sue Egypt" on Doc at the Radar Station, and "The Witch Doctor Life" later appeared on Ice Cream for Crow. "Drink Paint Run Run" was an early version (with completely different lyrics) of "Ice Cream for Crow".

=== Musical content ===
The music on The Spotlight Kid is simpler and slower than on the group's two previous releases, the uncompromisingly original Trout Mask Replica and the frenetic Lick My Decals Off, Baby. This was in part an attempt by Van Vliet to become a more appealing commercial proposition as the band had made virtually no money during the previous three years – at the time of recording, the band members were subsisting on welfare food handouts and remittances from their parents. Van Vliet offered that he "got tired of scaring people with what I was doing ... I realized that I had to give them something to hang their hat on, so I started working more of a beat into the music." Magic Band members have also said that the slower performances were due in part to Van Vliet's inability to fit his lyrics with the faster instrumental backing of the earlier albums. This problem was exacerbated by the fact that he almost never rehearsed with the group.

== Reception ==
Professional ratings
Review scores
Source	Rating
AllMusic	4/5 stars
Christgau's Record Guide	B+
DownBeat	3.5/5 stars
The Rolling Stone Record Guide	4/5 stars

Contemporary reviews were generally favorable. Lester Bangs described the album as appealing to a "new audience, the ones that teethed on feedback and boogie", acknowledging that Beefheart's previous work was "a bit beyond the attention span or interest of the average listener". Critic Robert Christgau graded the album as a B+ though he felt that Beefheart's "much-bruited commercial bid turns out to have all the mass appeal of King of the Delta Blues Singers". Stereo Review acknowledged the album as Beefheart's attempt to "go commercial", while opining that "Captain's conception of commercial is still sweetly weird". Colman Andrews writing in Phonograph Record Magazine described the album as evidence that Van Vliet was "the greatest white blues singer in America today". Jim Washburn, reviewing the album's reissue as a double CD with Clear Spot, noted that while "Beefheart seemed to be attempting to meet listeners halfway" the music was still "demanding, powerful stuff". Later assessments were less positive. Critic and Beefheart biographer Mike Barnes has offered that the album was "ponderous ... it really just lumbers along. You get the feeling that if the tracks were about half as fast again it would add a bit more energy." New Musical Express described the album as "manic depressive".

Despite being nominated as Melody Maker album of the month The Spotlight Kid failed to match the UK Top 20 success of Lick My Decals Off, Baby, peaking at No. 44. However, in the US it was the first Captain Beefheart album to appear in the Billboard Top 200. Its peak of No. 131 remains the highest attained by any Beefheart album. The album is now available as a "two for one" CD along with Beefheart's follow-up album, Clear Spot. Separately, the two albums are available as vinyl LP reissues. Van Vliet later blamed the album's lack of success on the band members, stating, "The band wasn't into what I wanted to do at the time ... They failed miserably on The Spotlight Kid." The tendency to take full credit for successes while blaming any failures on band members was typical of Beefheart, as related in John French's book, Beefheart: Through the Eyes of Magic.

=== Reaction from the Magic Band ===
The band members disliked the simple material and sluggish tempos. Drummer John French has said, "At the time I hated that album ... A lot of that stuff was really boring to play, because it was so simple and it wasn't going anywhere. For another thing a lot of the tracks were just so slow ... We just hated it." Guitarist Bill Harkleroad simply said "I hate that album. It sucks." He attributed the album's lackluster performances to the emotional toll of Van Vliet's behavior toward the band: "We were just emotionally beat to death by his particular environment... we were playing really anemically and it sucks because of that."

=== Legacy ===
Black Francis of the Pixies cited The Spotlight Kid as one of the albums he listened to regularly when first writing songs for the band.^{[165]}

== Track listing ==
All songs written by Don Van Vliet except where noted. Arranged by Bill Harkleroad and John French

Side one
No.	Title	Writer(s)	Length
1.	"I'm Gonna Booglarize You Baby"		4:33
2.	"White Jam"		2:55
3.	"Blabber 'n Smoke"	Van Vliet, Jan Van Vliet	2:46
4.	"When It Blows Its Stacks"		3:40
5.	"Alice in Blunderland"		3:54

Side two
No.	Title	Length
6.	"The Spotlight Kid"	3:21
7.	"Click Clack"	3:30
8.	"Grow Fins"	3:30
9.	"There Ain't No Santa Claus on the Evenin' Stage"	3:11
10.	"Glider"	4:34

== Personnel ==
- Captain Beefheart (Don Van Vliet) – vocals, harmonica, jingle bells
- Drumbo (John French) – drums, percussion
- Zoot Horn Rollo (Bill Harkleroad) – guitar, slide guitar
- Rockette Morton (Mark Boston) – bass, guitar
- Ed Marimba/Ted Cactus (Art Tripp) – drums, percussion, marimba, piano, harpsichord

Additional personnel

- Winged Eel Fingerling (Elliot Ingber) – guitar on "I’m Gonna Booglarize You, Baby" and "Alice in Blunderland"
- Rhys Clark – drums on "Glider"
