= French Frith Kaiser Thompson =

American/English experimental rock quartet

- Origin: San Francisco, California, United States
- Genres: Folk rock Experimental rock
- Years active: 1987, 1990
- Labels: Rhino, Windham Hill
- Past members: John French; Fred Frith; Henry Kaiser; Richard Thompson

French Frith Kaiser Thompson was an English/American experimental rock quartet comprising John French, Fred Frith, Henry Kaiser and Richard Thompson. The band was formed in 1987 to create an album, Live, Love, Larf & Loaf. In 1990 they recorded their second album, Invisible Means, and performed live in Berkeley, California to promote this album.

== History ==
Experimental American musicians, guitarist Henry Kaiser and drummer John French ("Drumbo" from Captain Beefheart's Magic Band), began collaborating in 1987. They invited English musicians Fred Frith (experimental guitarist from Henry Cow) and Richard Thompson (folk-rock guitarist from Fairport Convention) to join them to make an album.

They recorded Live, Love, Larf & Loaf in San Francisco in March 1987, an eclectic collection of songs drawn from a variety of music genres, including folk, R&B and avant-garde rock. Most of the album comprised compositions from each of the members of the group, plus a few covers, including the Beach Boys' "Surfin' U.S.A.".

While the group experimented with folk and rock music, it is generally felt that Thompson's presence did "tone down" the "avant-garde" leanings of the other three musicians. Mark Deming states in AllMusic that "... the slightly bent wit and angular guitar figures of Richard Thompson's signature brand of folk-rock certainly added a spoonful of sugar that helped the avant-leaning art rock of Henry Kaiser, Fred Frith, and John French go down more easily."

The group re-assembled in San Francisco in March 1990 to record Invisible Means, another collection of "skewed" songs from each of the members, plus one cover ("Loch Lomond").

== Members ==
- John French – drums, vocals
- Fred Frith – bass guitar, violin, guitar, vocals
- Henry Kaiser – guitar
- Richard Thompson – guitar, vocals

== Discography ==
- 1987: Live, Love, Larf & Loaf (LP Rhino Records, US)
- 1990: Invisible Means (CD Windham Hill Records, US)
