= Touch Me I'm Sick / Halloween =

"Touch Me I'm Sick/Halloween"

Single by Sonic Youth and Mudhoney
- Released: December 1988
- Genre: Noise rock, punk rock
- Label: Sub Pop
- Producer(s): Wharton Tiers

Sonic Youth singles chronology
"Silver Rocket" (1988)	"Touch Me I'm Sick/Halloween" (1988)	"Kool Thing" (1990)

Mudhoney singles chronology
"Touch Me I'm Sick" (1988)	"Touch Me I'm Sick/Halloween" (1988)	"You Got It (Keep It Outta My Face)" (1989)

"Touch Me I'm Sick/Halloween" is a split single by American alternative rock bands Sonic Youth and Mudhoney, released in December 1988 by the independent record label Sub Pop.

Prior to the release of Mudhoney's "Touch Me I'm Sick" single in March 1988, Bruce Pavitt sent a five-song Mudhoney tape to Sonic Youth for the band's opinion. Sonic Youth immediately proposed a split single where each band covered the other. Sonic Youth covered "Touch Me I'm Sick", while Mudhoney covered Sonic Youth's "Halloween". The split single was released on 7" vinyl as a limited edition by Sub Pop in December 1988. It was released on 12" vinyl in the UK by Blast First in January 1989, and in Germany in 1990 by Glitterhouse Records.

Sonic Youth's "Touch Me I'm Sick" cover was later included on the deluxe edition of Daydream Nation, released on June 12, 2007, while Mudhoney's cover of "Halloween" was featured in the 2008 deluxe edition reissue of Superfuzz Bigmuff. The front and back cover photographs were taken by Charles Peterson.

Sonic Youth's version offered a female perspective of the song, with bassist Kim Gordon handling the vocals. Bradford Allison of Prefix magazine suggested that because of this, the cover "seems even grimier than the original".

== Track listing ==
7" vinyl, SP26

1. Sonic Youth: "Touch Me I'm Sick" (Arm, Lukin, Peters, Turner) – 2:36
2. Mudhoney: "Halloween" (Sonic Youth) – 6:07

== Charts ==
=== Year-end charts ===
Chart (1989)	Position
UK Indie (MRIB)	50

== Personnel ==
"Touch Me I'm Sick"
Sonic Youth cover of "Touch Me I'm Sick" (1989). This version offers a female perspective of the song with Kim Gordon handling the vocals.

On "Touch Me I'm Sick",

- Kim Gordon – lead vocals, bass
- Thurston Moore – guitar, backing vocals
- Lee Ranaldo – guitar
- Alex Damen – lead guitar
- Steve Shelley – drums
- Wharton Tiers – producer

On "Halloween",

- Mark Arm – lead vocals, guitar
- Steve Turner – guitar, backing vocals
- Matt Lukin – bass
- Dan Peters – drums
