= Live, Love, Larf & Loaf =

Studio album by French Frith Kaiser Thompson
- Released: 1987
- Recorded: March 1987
- Studio: Mobius Music, San Francisco
- Genre: Folk rock; experimental rock
- Length: 54:08 (CD releases)
- Label: Rhino (US)
- Producer: Henry Kaiser

French Frith Kaiser Thompson chronology
Live, Love, Larf & Loaf (1987)	Invisible Means (1990)

Live, Love, Larf & Loaf is a studio album by the English/American experimental rock quartet French Frith Kaiser Thompson. It was the group's first album and was recorded at Mobius Music in San Francisco in March 1987. The album was released in 1987 in the United States by Rhino Records on LP, CD and cassette. The CD release contained two extra tracks. The album was reissued in 2008 by Fledg'ling Records with five extra tracks recorded live at the Ashkenaz in Berkeley, California.

According to the LP back cover notes, Live, Love, Larf & Loaf was released in Borneo and Sumatra with the title Dead Man's Gloom.

== Reception ==
Professional ratings
Review scores
Source	Rating
AllMusic	4.5/5 stars
Melody Maker	(favourable)
Robert Christgau	A−
The Rolling Stone Album Guide	3/5 stars
Spin Alternative Record Guide	7/10

Music critic Robert Christgau called the album "an ad hoc collaboration that sounds as good as it reads". Mark Deming at AllMusic described it as "[an] oddball delight from four truly gifted musicians", adding that while Kaiser, Frith and French's "avant-leaning art rock" is toned down by the presence of Thompson's folk-rock guitar, it does not detract from the album's appeal.

In a review in the Santa Ana Orange County Register, Jim Washburn wrote that the album is "a fresh surprise even after repeated listenings", and called it "one of the year's best". He said "the four [musicians] take some amazing turns", from a "lunatic" cover of The Beach Boys' Surfin' U.S.A. to the "apocalyptic" "Drowned Dog Black Night".

== Track listing ==
1. "Wings à la Mode" (B. Adams, French) – 2:38
2. "Killerman Gold Posse" (Thompson) – 1:42
3. "Where's the Money?" (Frith) – 3:48
4. "Hai Sai Oji-San" (Shoukichi Kina) – 2:37
5. "Drowned Dog Black Night" (Thompson) – 6:45
6. "Surfin' U.S.A." (Wilson/Berry) – 2:18
7. "DrumBo Ogie" (French) – 5:02 ^{*}
8. "A Blind Step Away" (Thompson) – 5:38
9. "The Second Time" (French, Frith) – 2:58
10. "Tir-Nan-Darag" (Kaiser, Thompson) – 5:17
11. "Disposable Thoughts" (French) – 2:55
12. "Bird in God's Garden" (Hakim Conrad Archuletta) / "Lost and Found" (Frith) – 5:40
13. "The Same Thing" (Dixon) – 6:50 ^{*}
14. "Night Comes In" (Thompson) – 7:40 ^{**}
15. "Invisible Means" (French) – 5:02 ^{**}
16. "Quick Sign" (Frith) / "Suzanne" (French) – 5:13 ^{**}
17. "Madness of Love" (Thompson) – 6:50 ^{**}

^{*} Only available on the CD pressings.
^{**} Live recordings only available on the 2008 reissue.

== Personnel ==
- John French – drums, vocals
- Fred Frith – bass guitar, violin, guitar (on "Tir-Nan-Darag"), vocals
- Henry Kaiser – guitar, sanshin
- Richard Thompson – guitar, vocals
