= Teen Age Riot =

1988 single by Sonic Youth

Single by Sonic Youth

from the album Daydream Nation
- B-side: "Silver Rocket"; "Kissability"
- Released: October 1988
- Recorded: July–August 1988
- Studio: Greene St. Recording (New York City)
- Genre: Alternative rock; indie rock
- Length: 6:57 (album version); 3:50 (single version)
- Label: Blast First
- Songwriter: Sonic Youth
- Producers: Sonic Youth; Nick Sansano

Sonic Youth singles chronology
"Starpower" (1986)	"Teen Age Riot" (1988)	"Silver Rocket" (1988)

Music video
- "Teen Age Riot" on YouTube

"Teen Age Riot" is a song by the American alternative rock band Sonic Youth, and the first single from their 1988 album Daydream Nation. It was their first song to receive significant airplay on modern rock radio and considerably expanded their audience.

"Teen Age Riot" is one of Sonic Youth's most recognizable and conventional songs. The song was included in The Rock and Roll Hall of Fame's 500 Songs That Shaped Rock and Roll and is an on-disc track in the game Rock Band 2.

"Teen Age Riot" was the last song the band played live, closing the setlist of their final live performance at the SWU Music & Arts festival in Paulínia, Brazil, on November 14, 2011.

== Music and lyrics ==
The song's lyrics imagine the band's friend J Mascis, frontman of Dinosaur Jr., as president of the United States. In the liner notes accompanying the deluxe edition of Daydream Nation, Byron Coley quoted Thurston Moore on "Teen Age Riot": "It was actually about appointing J Mascis as our de facto alternative dream president".

The album version of the song has two distinct parts. The intro section features a repeating, hypnotic guitar melody, and spoken word vocals from Kim Gordon. After 80 seconds, all instruments stop, and Moore breaks through the fading instruments with a fast, distorted, guitar riff, opening the main section of the song. The riff leads to the dynamic guitar melody that plays throughout the rest of the song, with vocals by Moore.

As with many Sonic Youth songs, the guitars were unconventionally tuned; in this case, Moore's tuning was GABDEG and Lee Ranaldo's tuning was GGDDGG, as published in a Guitar World interview with the band.

Some live performances of "Teen Age Riot" omitted the opening section sung by Gordon, notably the live version recorded and released with the deluxe edition of Daydream Nation. The opening section was also cut from the song's music video.

== Critical reception ==
Mark Deming of AllMusic described "Teen Age Riot" as a "trippy joy", further praising the song as a "glorious experience". According to Greg Kot of the Chicago Tribune, the song is one of "the band's best, straight-ahead tunes". Michael Hand of The Guardian designated the song as a highlight from Daydream Nation, further describing the song as a "wistful opener". Nitsuh Abebe of Pitchfork praised the song, writing that it's "the most glorious, accessible pop song of [Sonic Youth's] career". Robert Palmer of Rolling Stone also spoke positively of "Teen Age Riot", describing the song as "driving slamtempo pop power".

In 2021, it was ranked at number 157 on Rolling Stone's list of "The 500 Greatest Songs of All Time".

== Chart performance ==
In the United States, "Teen Age Riot" debuted at number 28 on the Alternative Airplay chart for the issue dated December 24, 1988. Over the next month, the song slowly rose on the chart and reached a peak of number 20 for the issue dated February 4, 1989. "Teen Age Riot" spent a total of nine consecutive weeks on the chart.

== Music video ==
The video for the song was Sonic Youth's fourth, excluding the low-budget Ciccone Youth videos; the band directed it themselves. It included clips of many icons of alternative music culture such as Mascis, Mark E. Smith, Johnny Thunders, Neil Young, Patti Smith, Iggy Pop, Sun Ra, D. Boon, Mike Watt, Ian MacKaye, Henry Rollins, Nick Cave, Tom Waits, Blixa Bargeld and Kiss.

== Track listings and formats ==
UK and US 12-inch single (BFUS34)

1. "Teen Age Riot" (Gordon, Moore, Ranaldo, Shelley) – 3:50
2. "Silver Rocket" (Gordon, Moore, Ranaldo, Shelley) – 3:47
3. "Kissability" (Gordon, Moore, Ranaldo, Shelley) – 3:08

UK and US 7-inch flexi disc single (CAT064)

1. "Teen Age Riot" (Gordon, Moore, Ranaldo, Shelley) – 6:39

== Charts ==
Chart (1988)	Peak position
US Alternative Airplay (Billboard)	20
