= Safe as Milk =

Studio album by Captain Beefheart and His Magic Band
- Released: August 1967
- Recorded: Spring 1967
- Studios: RCA, Los Angeles
- Genres: Blues rock; garage rock; R&B; acid rock; folk rock
- Length: 33:40
- Label: Buddah
- Producers: Richard Perry, Bob Krasnow

Captain Beefheart and His Magic Band chronology
Safe as Milk (1967)	Strictly Personal (1968)

Singles from Safe as Milk
- 1. "Yellow Brick Road" / "Abba Zaba" Released: August 17, 1967; 2. "Plastic Factory" / "Where There's Woman" Released: March 25, 1969

Safe as Milk is the debut studio album by American music group Captain Beefheart (original name Don Van Vliet) and His Magic Band, released in August 1967 by Buddah Records. A heavily blues-influenced work, the album features a 20-year-old Ry Cooder, who played guitar and wrote some of the arrangements.

== Background ==
Before recording Safe as Milk, the band had released a few singles through A&M Records, and it was to this company that the group first proposed their début album in 1966. They presented the label with a set of R&B‑influenced demos, which the label felt were too unconventional and decided to drop the band. Beefheart later said the label dropped them after hearing the song "Electricity" and declaring it "too negative". A&M's Jerry Moss thought the content too risqué for his daughter's ears. This, plus Leonard Grant's severance as manager, added to the discontent. The band instead turned to Bob Krasnow, who was then working for Kama Sutra Records; he recruited them to record for the company's new subsidiary label, Buddah.

Meanwhile, Beefheart had been secretly planning changes to the Magic Band's line-up—a practice common throughout the group's existence. The group that recorded the two A&M singles had consisted of Doug Moon and Richard Hepner on guitars, Jerry Handley on bass, and Alex St. Clair on drums. Hepner had already left, and Beefheart was keen to replace Moon with Ry Cooder, who was then playing with Gary Marker and Taj Mahal in the Rising Sons. These and other changes resulted in a Magic Band with Handley on bass, St. Clair on guitar, and John French on drums, with Cooder providing additional guitar parts. Cooder's arrival had been swayed by Marker, who had spent time with Beefheart and had been given to believe he would produce the album; in fact, Marker was only engaged in demo recording.

Don Van Vliet has said that the title "Safe as Milk" is a sarcastic reference to the contamination in women's breast milk, either with the pesticide DDT or radioactive strontium-90 in different published interviews.

== Music and lyrics ==
The album is heavily influenced by the Delta blues, and this is apparent from the opening bars of the first track, "Sure 'Nuff 'n Yes I Do", based on Muddy Waters' "Rollin' and Tumblin'". The opening lyric, "Well I was born in the desert ...", quotes "New Minglewood Blues" by Cannon's Jug Stompers, an early version of "Rollin' and Tumblin". Elsewhere, the album features a version of Robert Pete Williams' "Grown So Ugly" arranged by Cooder.

Another of the more distinctive songs on the album is "Abba Zaba", one of three compositions credited solely to Beefheart using his real name. An AllMusic review of the track states, "Although not directly blues influenced 'Abba Zaba' contains peripheral elements of the wiry delta sound that informed much of the album", noting that Cooder's influence is heard here in the "chiming, intricate guitar lines" and "up front and biting bass work". The track is named after the Abba-Zaba candy bar, which was supposedly a favorite of the young Beefheart. The band had, at one point, planned to name the album after the confection, but the bar's manufacturer, the Cardinet Candy Co., refused permission for use of the name, and the album was retitled. The black and yellow checkerboard pattern on the album's back sleeve, designed by Tom Wilkes, is a relic of this idea—echoing the black and yellow colors of the candy bar wrapper. Writing an obituary for Beefheart in 2010, for The Washington Post, Matt Schudel said:

"Mr. Van Vliet's lyrics and song titles owed a great deal to surreal poetry. Try as they might, his fans had a difficult time analyzing such lines as these from "Abba Zabba" on the 1966 album Safe as Milk:

Mother say son, she say son, you can't lose, with the stuff you use
Abba Zabba go-zoom Babbette baboon
Run, run, monsoon, Indian dream, tiger moon.

For some time, the involvement of Herb Bermann as co-writer on eight of the tracks was a point of confusion, as Vliet did not employ him, or indeed any regular co-writer at any other time in his career, and never discussed or clarified his role in the album. There was little record of his existence, though his name incidentally also appeared in a reference to an unproduced screenplay for After the Gold Rush on the 1971 Neil Young album of the same name. Various Magic Band members had in fact indicated that the name may have been nothing other than a publishing-related pseudonym. It was only in 2003 that Bermann himself was finally located and interviewed, and his involvement as co-writer confirmed.

== Critical reception ==
Professional ratings
Review scores
Source	Rating
AllMusic	5/5 stars
The Encyclopedia of Popular Music	4/5 stars

Safe As Milk was prominently advertised in Billboard and World Countdown in June 1967. However, the band's planned appearance at the Monterey Festival that month fell through, and the record did not achieve popular success, failing to chart in either the United States, where none of Beefheart's albums would ever enter the top 100, or in the United Kingdom, where the band would enjoy modest success with later works such as Trout Mask Replica (1969). John Lennon had two Safe As Milk promotional stickers on cupboard doors at his home. In 1968, Rolling Stone praised Beefheart's voice, but stated that the album "failed by lapsing into dull commercial rock on the order of Love's early efforts."

The album made a greater impact in Europe than in the U.S., with the British underground DJ John Peel being a noted admirer from the start, though the original British release was in mono only.

The album was included in Robert Dimery's 1001 Albums You Must Hear Before You Die. In 1999, Jon Savage reflected in Mojo: "Safe as Milk remains a towering achievement: an avant-garde pop masterpiece from the time when they had only just started to make them. Along with the first couple of Love and Mothers' albums and The Velvet Underground and Nico, Safe as Milk had a huge impact in the UK, largely thanks to radio play by John Peel; don't forget that it was hardly possible to get any actual San Franciscan albums until the end of 1967."

It was voted number 172 in Colin Larkin's All Time Top 1000 Albums 3rd Edition (2000).

== Reissues ==
The album was released in the UK on Pye International, and subsequently reissued in Pye's budget Marble Arch series (albeit bearing Pye International labels on the disc itself) as a 10-track, omitting "I'm Glad" and "Grown So Ugly". When Buddah's UK distribution passed to Polydor in 1970 it was again reissued, this time on Buddah in Polydor's budget 99 series and retitled Dropout Boogie. Initially the track listing of this release matched the Marble Arch version, but the missing tracks were quickly restored. This 99 series release was also the first appearance in the UK of a stereo mix of the album.

In 1999, the now-correctly spelled Buddha Records, owned by Sony BMG who had acquired Buddah's back catalogue, remastered the album onto CD. They added seven bonus tracks, taken from the sessions for the unreleased Brown Wrapper follow-up album. These tracks had been recorded around November 1967 (two months after Safe as Milk's release), and were from the same sessions that yielded the songs on Mirror Man (1971). BMG's Buddha also released The Mirror Man Sessions on CD in 1999, effectively an official issue of the unphased versions of Mirror Man, with five further bonus tracks taken from the same sessions.

In 2013, Sundazed Music released the mono mix of Safe As Milk on LP and CD.

== Track listing ==
All songs written by Herb Bermann and Don Van Vliet except where noted. All CD bonus tracks written by Van Vliet.

Side one
No.	Title	Writer(s)	Length
1.	"Sure 'Nuff 'n Yes I Do"		2:15
2.	"Zig Zag Wanderer"		2:40
3.	"Call on Me"	Van Vliet (Note: Some sources credit "Call on Me" to earlier Magic Band drummer Vic Mortensen, and not Van Vliet or Bermann.)	2:37
4.	"Dropout Boogie"		2:32
5.	"I'm Glad"	Van Vliet	3:31
6.	"Electricity"		3:07
Total length:			16:42

Side two
No.	Title	Writer(s)	Length
7.	"Yellow Brick Road"		2:28
8.	"Abba Zaba"	Van Vliet	2:44
9.	"Plastic Factory"	Van Vliet; Bermann; Jerry Handley	3:08
10.	"Where There's Woman"		2:09
11.	"Grown So Ugly"	Robert Pete Williams	2:27
12.	"Autumn's Child"		4:02
Total length:			16:58 33:40

CD bonus tracks
No.	Title	Length
13.	"Safe as Milk" (Take 5)	4:13
14.	"On Tomorrow"	6:56
15.	"Big Black Baby Shoes"	4:50
16.	"Flower Pot"	3:55
17.	"Dirty Blue Gene"	2:43
18.	"Trust Us" (Take 9)	7:22
19.	"Korn Ring Finger"	7:26
Total length:		37:25 71:05

== Personnel ==
Captain Beefheart and his Magic Band

- Don Van Vliet – lead vocals, harmonica, marimba, arrangements
- Alex St. Clair Snouffer – guitar, backing vocals, bass (9, 10), percussion
- Ry Cooder – guitar, slide guitar, bass (8), percussion, arrangements
- Jerry Handley – bass (except 8, 10), backing vocals
- John French – drums, backing vocals, percussion

Additional musicians

- Samuel Hoffman – theremin (6, 12)
- Milt Holland – log drum, tambourine, percussion (2, 4 and 8)
- Taj Mahal – tambourine, percussion (7)
- Russ Titelman – guitar (12)

Production

- Richard Perry – producer (at RCA Studio), harpsichord
- Bob Krasnow – producer
- Hank Cicalo – engineer (at RCA Studio)
- Gary Marker – engineer (demos at Original Sound & Sunset Sound)
