= Silver Rocket =

Single by Sonic Youth

from the album Daydream Nation
- B-side: “You Pose You Lose”/“Non-Metal Dude Wearing Metal Tee” (U.S. pressing); "Slow Death"/"I Got a Right" (Spanish pressing)
- Released: 1988
- Genre: Noise rock; punk rock
- Label: Forced Exposure, Teenager From Outer Space Records, Munster Records
- Songwriters: Kim Gordon, Thurston Moore, Lee Ranaldo, Steve Shelley
- Producers: Nick Sansano, Sonic Youth

Sonic Youth singles chronology
| "Teen Age Riot" (1988) | "Silver Rocket" (1988) | "Touch Me I'm Sick/Halloween" (1989) |

"Silver Rocket" is both the second track and second single from Sonic Youth's 1988 album Daydream Nation. Like all the tracks on the album, the Daydream Nation version of “Silver Rocket” was recorded in the studio, whereas all editions of the single featured a live version of the song with alternate lyrics and were pressed in small runs by independent fanzines. The studio album version also appeared on the B-side of the 12” edition of the band's previous single, “Teen Age Riot.” A video was also produced for “Silver Rocket,” featuring a recording of the song different from any of those appearing on any of the band's singles or albums.

Sung by guitarist Thurston Moore, "Silver Rocket" has a main riff which shows the influence of punk rock. About 90 seconds into the song, the guitars are detuned and the song becomes a noise rock soundscape, before heading into the final verse and chorus.

== Formats and track listings ==
All versions of the “Silver Rocket” 7” single feature a live version of the song. In performance, Thurston Moore had changed the second verse of the song to include references to other musicians and pop social icons of the time including J. Mascis and Cher, and these alternate lyrics appear on the single.

=== U.S. version ===
The American version of the "Silver Rocket" 7” was released by the house label for Forced Exposure magazine and made available only to the magazine's subscribers. The two tracks on the A-side were taken from a concert at Maxwell's in Hoboken, New Jersey. The B-side is retitled instrumental version of “Eliminator, Jr.” taken from a show at CBGB in New York. Cover art for the single was by French cartoonist and publisher Paquito Bolino.

A-side

1. "Silver Rocket”
2. “You Pose You Lose”

B-side

1. "Non-Metal Dude Wearing Metal Tee”

All three tracks were later made available on Sonic Youth's Rarities 2 compilation, made available exclusively through the group's Bandcamp page in September 2020.

=== European version ===
Pressed in Spain by Teenager From Outer Space Records, the European version of the “Silver Rocket” 7” features Sonic Youth on one side and two songs by the Portland, Oregon band The Miracle Workers on the other. The single was only available in a double issue of the magazine La Herencia De Los Munster with cover art that needed to be cut out and assembled into a record sleeve.

A-side

1. "Silver Rocket (Live)" (Sonic Youth)

B-side

1. "Slow Death" (The Miracle Workers, originally by Flamin' Groovies)
2. "I Got a Right" (The Miracle Workers, originally by The Stooges)

== Critical reception ==
According to AllMusic's Stewart Mason, the song boasts "the first genuinely catchy chorus of the band's career" and compares it to Mudhoney's "Touch Me I'm Sick." Rolling Stone ranked it No. 79 in the "100 Greatest Guitar Songs of All Time". It was ranked the 183rd greatest song of all time by the Italian magazine Rumore. The song was listed at No. 33 in Les Inrockuptibles's 1000 Necessary Songs.
