= Lick My Decals Off, Baby =

Studio album by Captain Beefheart and the Magic Band
- Released: December 1970
- Recorded: May 1970
- Studio: Record Plant (West Hollywood, California)
- Genres: Avant-rock; art rock; avant-pop
- Length: 39:38
- Labels: Straight; Reprise
- Producer: Don Van Vliet

Captain Beefheart and the Magic Band chronology
Trout Mask Replica (1969)	Lick My Decals Off, Baby (1970)	Mirror Man (1971)

Professional ratings
Review scores
Source	Rating
AllMusic	4.5/5 stars
Christgau's Record Guide	A−
The Rolling Stone Album Guide	4/5 stars

Lick My Decals Off, Baby is the fourth studio album by the American musician Captain Beefheart (Don Van Vliet) and the Magic Band, released in December 1970 by Straight and Reprise Records. The follow-up to Trout Mask Replica (1969), it is regarded by some critics and listeners as superior, and was Van Vliet's own favorite of his albums. In his words, the title credo of the album was an encouragement to "get rid of the labels", and to evaluate things according to their merits.

== Composition ==
Captain Beefheart performs vocals, harmonica, and woodwinds on the album, joined by Bill "Zoot Horn Rollo" Harkleroad on guitar; Mark "Rockette Morton" Boston on bass guitar; Art "Ed Marimba" Tripp, late of Frank Zappa's Mothers of Invention, on marimba, drums, and percussion; and John "Drumbo" French on drums and percussion.

French had been the band's arranger and musical director on Trout Mask Replica. Van Vliet ejected French from the group—both figuratively and literally, by allegedly throwing him down a flight of stairs—shortly after Trout Mask Replica was completed, and these roles passed to Harkleroad. French returned to the group shortly before recording began, but after Tripp had been hired to replace him, and so both percussionists appear on the album.

Most of the songs began as piano improvisations by Van Vliet, which Harkleroad arranged into full-band compositions. Although both albums have been described as "equally experimental in nature", the musical lines on Decals tend to be longer and more intricate than the assemblage of short fragments that characterized much of Trout Mask Replica. The liner notes contain two poems or sets of lyrics for songs not present on the album, one untitled and the other entitled "You Should Know by the Kindness of uh Dog the Way uh Human Should Be".

== Critical and commercial reception ==
Critic Robert Christgau said of the record: "Beefheart's famous five-octave range and covert totalitarian structures have taken on a playful undertone, repulsive and engrossing and slapstick funny." Lester Bangs noted the maturation of Beefheart’s previous musical and lyrical concerns, writing that "even though the sonic textures are sometimes even more complex and angular than on Trout Mask...his messages are universal and warm as the hearth of the America we once dreamed of".

With John Peel championing the work on BBC radio, Lick My Decals Off, Baby spent eleven weeks on the UK Albums Chart, peaking at number twenty and becoming his highest-charting album in the country.

An early promotional music video was made of its title song, and a television commercial for the album was also produced that included excerpts from "Woe-Is-uh-Me-Bop", silent footage of masked Magic Band members using kitchen utensils as musical instruments, and Van Vliet kicking over a bowl of porridge onto a dividing stripe in the middle of a road. The video was rarely played, but was later accepted into the Museum of Modern Art.

Enigma Retro released a compact disc edition in 1989; the album has also seen reissue as a 180g vinyl LP, which is still in print. In January 2011, shortly after Van Vliet's death, iTunes and Amazon's MP3 store released the album for download. On November 17, 2014, Rhino Records reissued the album as part of the limited edition four-disc Beefheart box set Sun Zoom Spark: 1970 to 1972, which also included The Spotlight Kid, Clear Spot, and a disc of outtakes from the three albums. The album was reissued separately, without bonus tracks, by Rhino on September 25, 2015.

== Covers ==
Magazine recorded a cover of "I Love You, You Big Dummy" in 1978.

== Track listing ==
All songs initially composed by Don Van Vliet. Arranged by Bill Harkleroad.

Side one
No.	Title	Length
1.	"Lick My Decals Off, Baby"	2:38
2.	"Doctor Dark"	2:46
3.	"I Love You, You Big Dummy"	2:54
4.	"Peon" (instrumental)	2:24
5.	"Bellerin' Plain"	3:35
6.	"Woe-Is-uh-Me-Bop"	2:06
7.	"Japan in a Dishpan" (instrumental)	3:00

Side two
No.	Title	Length
1.	"I Wanna Find a Woman That'll Hold My Big Toe Till I Have to Go"	1:53
2.	"Petrified Forest"	1:40
3.	"One Red Rose That I Mean" (instrumental)	1:52
4.	"The Buggy Boogie Woogie"	2:19
5.	"The Smithsonian Institute [sic] Blues (or the Big Dig)"	2:11
6.	"Space-Age Couple"	2:32
7.	"The Clouds Are Full of Wine (not Whiskey or Rye)"	2:50
8.	"Flash Gordon's Ape"	4:15

=== 8-track tape edition ===
No.	Title	Length
1.	"Lick My Decals Off, Baby"	2:38
2.	"Doctor Dark"	2:46
3.	"Woe-Is-uh-Me-Bop"	2:06
4.	"Space-Age Couple"	2:32
5.	"I Love You, You Big Dummy"	2:54
6.	"Bellerin' Plain"	3:35
7.	"Japan in a Dishpan" (instrumental)	3:00
8.	"Peon" (instrumental)	2:24
9.	"I Wanna Find a Woman That'll Hold My Big Toe Till I Have to Go"	1:53
10.	"Petrified Forest"	1:40
11.	"One Red Rose That I Mean" (instrumental)	1:52
12.	"The Buggy Boogie Woogie"	2:19
13.	"The Smithsonian Institute Blues (or the Big Dig)"	2:11
14.	"The Clouds Are Full of Wine (not Whiskey or Rye)"	2:50
15.	"Flash Gordon's Ape"	4:15

== Personnel ==
- Captain Beefheart – vocals, bass clarinet, tenor saxophone, soprano saxophone, harmonica
- Zoot Horn Rollo – electric guitar, glass finger guitar
- Rockette Morton – bassius-o-pheilius
- Drumbo – drums, percussion, broom
- Ed Marimba – marimba, drums, percussion, broom

Production

- Grant Gibb – personal management
- Peacock Ink – album concept
- Don Van Vliet – back cover painting
- Ed Thrasher – photography and art direction
