= Touch Me I'm Sick =

1988 song by Mudhoney

- Picture sleeve for second and third editions of the US vinyl single

Single by Mudhoney
- B-side: "Sweet Young Thing Ain't Sweet No More"
- Released: August 1, 1988
- Recorded: April 15 and 21, 1988
- Studio: Reciprocal Recording, Seattle, Washington
- Genre: Grunge
- Length: 2:33
- Label: Sub Pop
- Songwriters: Mark Arm, Steve Turner, Dan Peters, Matt Lukin
- Producers: Jack Endino, Mudhoney

Mudhoney singles chronology
"Touch Me I'm Sick" (1988)	"Touch Me I'm Sick" / "Halloween" (1988)

Music video
- "Touch Me I'm Sick" on YouTube

"Touch Me I'm Sick" is a song by the American alternative rock band Mudhoney. It was recorded in April 1988 at Seattle's Reciprocal Recording studio with producer Jack Endino. "Touch Me I'm Sick" was released as Mudhoney's debut single by independent record label Sub Pop on August 1, 1988. The song's lyrics, which feature dark humor, are a sarcastic take on issues such as disease and violent sex.

When it was first released, "Touch Me I'm Sick" was a hit on college radio. Its heavily distorted and fuzzy guitars, snarling vocals, blunt bass line and energetic drumming contributed to a dirty sound that influenced many local musicians, and helped develop the nascent Seattle grunge scene. According to AllMusic, "the song's raw, primal energy made it an instant anthem which still stands as one of [grunge's] all-time classics". A staple of Mudhoney's live shows, it remains the band's most recognizable song.

== Origins and recording ==
According to Mudhoney vocalist Mark Arm, "Touch Me I'm Sick" originated from a discussion with Sub Pop owner Bruce Pavitt, who "said: 'Hey, you sing about dogs. You sing about being sick. You got a shtick, it'll take you to the top.' And he basically gave us five chords, but he said don't use more than three within one song." Arm has also described "Touch Me I'm Sick" as a catchphrase around which the band built a song.

Mudhoney recorded the song at Seattle's Reciprocal Recording studio in April 1988, three months after the band's formation. Producer Jack Endino was surprised by how noisy the sessions were and how dirty the band wanted the guitars to sound, stating: "for the most part, I just sort of stood back and let them go at it". Guitarist Steve Turner said the band selected two of their "grungiest" songs for the single. "Sweet Young Thing Ain't Sweet No More" was to be the A-side of the single and "Touch Me I'm Sick" the B-side before, in drummer Dan Peters's words, "that all got flipped around".

== Music and lyrics ==
"Touch Me I'm Sick"
Sample of "Touch Me I'm Sick", illustrating its high tempo, heavily distorted main guitar riff and frenetic drumming

"Touch Me I'm Sick" has a straightforward garage punk structure with a simple repeating power chord riff played at a high tempo. This is accompanied by a blunt bass line and frenetic drumming. The song's dirty sound was produced using an Electro-Harmonix Big Muff distortion pedal, which is augmented by a second guitar providing more distortion. Music writer Brian J. Barr referred to this noisy sound as "the sonic equivalent of an amplified comb scraping against paper".

Critics have noted a Stooges influence in "Touch Me I'm Sick", typical of Mudhoney's early material. Turner said: "In retrospect, it's The Yardbirds' 'Happenings Ten Years Time Ago' by way of The Stooges' 'Sick of You'. At the time I was trying for the stuttering R&B guitar of The Nights and Days." The song is also reminiscent of the hardcore punk of Black Flag. In his book Loser: The Real Seattle Music Story, Clark Humphrey accuses the song of being a copy of "The Witch" by The Sonics. Mudhoney have dismissed this claim, and questioned the writer's knowledge of music.

Arm's lyrics, according to critic Steve Huey, are a rant about "disease, self-loathing, angst, and dirty sex". In an essay called "'Touch Me I'm Sick': Contagion as Critique in Punk and Performance Art", Catherine J. Creswell suggests that some of the lyrics refer to AIDS. According to Creswell, "In declaring 'Well, I'm diseased and I don't mind' and changing the final refrain to 'Fuck Me, I'm Sick!' the speaker declares himself to be the viral, 'AIDS-bearing,' 'polluting' person of contemporary fantasy". Creswell, who also believes the song parodies the theme of seduction in contemporary rock music, points to lyrics that refer to impotence ("If you don't come, if you don't come, if you don't come, you'll die alone!") and violent possession or forcing ("I'll make you love me till the day you die!"). However, Arm says that he had not put much thought into the lyrics; while performing the song in concerts, he sometimes changes them to amuse himself.

Another feature of "Touch Me I'm Sick" that has been commented upon is Arm's vocals. Huey refers to them as a "hysterical screech", and "snarling, demonic howls". Similarly, the music writer Sleazegrinder compares Arm's singing to "a gargly, half-mad howl, the panicky yelp of a rabid dog falling down a well". Creswell considers Arm's "overboard" vocals to mock a variety of rock stereotypes: the punk snarl, the "woozy slur" of hard rock, garage rock "yea-ahs", R&B-style wails and a "Jerry Lee Lewis shudder".

== Release and reception ==
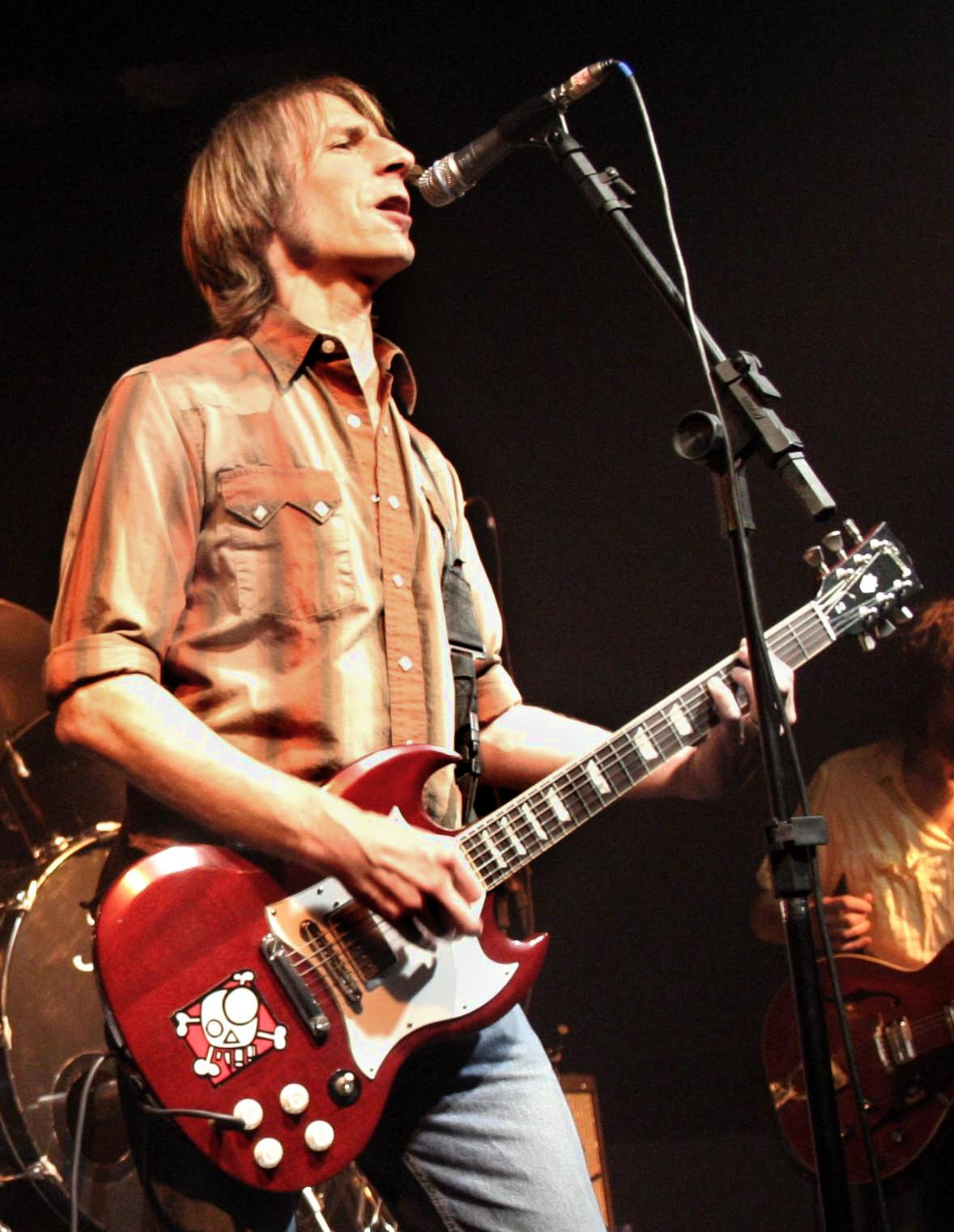
Vocalist Mark Arm in 2007. Arm had initially dismissed the song as a "B-side toss off".

"Touch Me I'm Sick" was released on August 1, 1988, as a 7" vinyl. It was Mudhoney's debut release. Initially, Sub Pop released 800 clear coffee-brown vinyl copies, 200 black vinyl copies and a few assorted vinyl color copies of the single. The limited release numbers were inspired by another indie label, Amphetamine Reptile. Sub Pop owners Bruce Pavitt and Jonathan Poneman reasoned the limited supply would increase demand, and utilized different colors of vinyl in order to rationalize further limited pressings and to increase the single's allure as a collectible item. The record, which came in a white paper bag without a picture sleeve, had an inscription on the A-side: "What does the word 'crack' mean to you?". The B-side sticker featured the toilet picture that later became the cover art of the sleeved second edition of the single.

According to Pavitt, "It was just a limited edition, maybe 800 pieces, but people all over America started raving about it. People that we really respected." The single was a hit among Seattle's underground music scene, as well as college radio stations across the United States. When asked in an interview about the sales figures of the single, Turner replied, "The first [pressing sold] 1,000, then 3,000 of the reissue, then it was out of print for a while; then they made 2,000 more and those are probably gone." The single's success caught the band by surprise; Arm had initially dismissed the song as a "B-side toss off". Mudhoney later included "Touch Me I'm Sick" and B-side "Sweet Young Thing Ain't Sweet No More" on their 1989 EP Boiled Beef & Rotting Teeth and the compilation albums Superfuzz Bigmuff Plus Early Singles (1990) and March to Fuzz (2000).

=== Sonic Youth cover ===
Prior to the release of the "Touch Me I'm Sick" single, Pavitt sent a five-song Mudhoney tape to New York alternative rock band Sonic Youth for their opinions. Sonic Youth immediately proposed a split single where each band covered the other. Sonic Youth covered "Touch Me I'm Sick" while Mudhoney covered Sonic Youth's "Halloween". "Touch Me I'm Sick"/"Halloween" was released as a limited edition 7" vinyl by Sub Pop in December 1988. Sonic Youth's cover was included in the deluxe edition of Daydream Nation (2007), and offers a female perspective of the song with bassist Kim Gordon handling the vocals. Bradford Allison of Prefix magazine suggested that Sonic Youth's version "seems even grimier than the original".

== Legacy ==
"I got really depressed ... I was just going to be a stripper for the rest of my life and never have a band again. But I heard Mudhoney's 'Touch Me I'm Sick' one night, and I was saved. I knew that I could scream on cue like that."

— Courtney Love on her decision to give up stripping and pursue a career in music

Following the success of the "Touch Me I'm Sick" single in the Seattle area, Sub Pop positioned Mudhoney as the flagship band of their roster and heavily promoted the group. The band's early material received airplay on college radio and influenced many local musicians, including Kurt Cobain of Nirvana. In a few years, many Seattle grunge bands signed to major labels and broke into the mainstream, achieving mass popularity. Although Mudhoney never attained this level of mainstream acceptance, according to AllMusic's Mark Deming, the band's "indie-scene success laid the groundwork for the movement that would (briefly) make Seattle, WA, the new capital of the rock & roll universe".

Since its release, "Touch Me I'm Sick" has been accorded classic status within the grunge genre. Writing for AllMusic, Steve Huey described the song as "the ultimate grunge anthem" and "a crucial and vastly influential touchstone in the evolution of the grunge movement, virtually defining the term". For its northwestern rock exhibit, the Rock and Roll Hall of Fame requested the song's original lyrics sheet. Since it did not exist—Arm briefly considered making a fake one by writing down the lyrics, crumpling the sheet, and then burning the edges—the band instead donated Turner's old Big Muff pedals. First editions of the 7" itself are considered collector's items, "routinely command[ing] three-figure prices", according to Louder magazine in 2016.

"Touch Me I'm Sick" remains Mudhoney's most popular song. Joe Ehrbar called it "the song most of us would come to know [the band] by". A staple of Mudhoney's live set ever since its release, Arm says the band hasn't tired of performing the song: "The beauty of it is that it’s two minutes long. It’s not like it’s 'Free Bird' where you have to suffer through 10 minutes of playing it every night." He considers the track to be Mudhoney's highwater mark,

"There's something special about that first single, we were never quite able to recapture that sound. I don't know if it was the guitars or the recording. It was just a really gnarly, gnarly guitar sound. ... I think it had more to do with the actual electromagnetic chemistry of what was going through our amps that day. It was just a cool, fried-out sound."

The song was referenced in the 1992 film Singles, which is set against the backdrop of the Seattle grunge scene. The fictional band in the film, Citizen Dick, perform a song called "Touch Me I'm Dick"—a wordplay on Mudhoney's song. In 2003, Charles Peterson published a book of photography titled Touch Me I'm Sick. It features black-and-white photographs of bands (including Mudhoney) and concerts, and focuses on the alternative music scene of the 1980s and 1990s.

=== Accolades ===
Accolades for "Touch Me I'm Sick"
Year	Publication/ author	Country	Accolade	Rank
2002	NME	United Kingdom	100 Greatest Singles of All Time	99
2004	Kerrang!	United Kingdom	666 Songs You Must Own (Grunge)	5
2005	Blender	United States	The 500 Greatest Songs Since You Were Born (1981–2005)	396
2006	Toby Creswell	Australia	1001 Songs: The Great Songs of All Time	N/A
2010	Robert Dimery	United States	1001 Songs You Must Hear Before You Die	N/A
2014	Paste	United States	The 50 Best Grunge Songs	8

== Track listing ==
7" single (SP18)

Both songs credited to Mark Arm, Steve Turner, Dan Peters and Matt Lukin.

1. "Touch Me I'm Sick" – 2:33
2. "Sweet Young Thing Ain't Sweet No More" – 3:35
