= Invisible Means =

Studio album by French Frith Kaiser Thompson
- Released: 1990
- Recorded: March 1990
- Studio: Mobius Music, San Francisco
- Genre: Folk rock; experimental rock
- Length: 68:23
- Label: Windham Hill (US)
- Producer: Henry Kaiser

French Frith Kaiser Thompson chronology
Live, Love, Larf & Loaf (1987)	Invisible Means (1990)

Invisible Means is a studio album by the English/American experimental rock quartet French Frith Kaiser Thompson. It was the group's second album and was recorded at Mobius Music in San Francisco on March 19–23, 1990. The album was released in 1990 in the United States by Windham Hill Records on CD. The album was reissued in 2008 by Fledg'ling Records with one extra track recorded live.

== Reception ==
Professional ratings
Review scores
Source	Rating
AllMusic	3/5 stars

In a review of the album in The Santa Fe New Mexican, Steve Terrell called French Frith Kaiser Thompson "the world's most obscure 'supergroup'". He says this collaboration is led by Kaiser, with his "whacky, ecclectic [sic] approach to rock", and Thompson, "break[ing] out of his own mold" and "experimenting with ... sheer craziness". Terrell liked the playfulness of Kaiser's "The Nearsighted Heron" and "Days of Our Lives", and Thompson's "mock opera", "March of the Cosmetic Surgeons". He also liked French's "Now That I Am Dead", although he was critical of some of French's other songs ("Invisible Means", "The Evening News" and "Suzanne"), which Terrell felt were the "low points of the album". But overall, Terrell called the album "a winner", adding that he hoped there was more to come from the group.

Mark Deming at AllMusic described Invisible Means as "calmer, and a bit easier to digest" than their first album, Live, Love, Larf & Loaf, but complained that it "lacks ... the playful wit and high spirits" of that album. Deming added, however, that there are some "intelligent but unexpectedly conventional-sounding pop tunes" from French, some good contributions from Kaiser and Frith, and "a stunning tune", "Killing Jar" from Thompson.

== Track listing ==
1. "Peppermint Rock" (Thompson) – 3:37
2. "To the Rain" (French) – 4:49
3. "Lizard's Tail" (Frith) – 4:20
4. "March of the Cosmetic Surgeons" (Thompson) – 5:09
5. "Suzanne" (French) – 2:56
6. "Quick Sign" (Frith) – 3:40
7. "Begging Bowl" (Thompson) – 3:18
8. "Kalo Takariva (Requiem for Maurice Halison)" (Kaiser) – 1:20
9. "Invisible Means" (Adams, French) – 4:59
10. "Loch Lomond" (traditional) – 4:45
11. "Play with Fire" (Nanker Phelge) – 9:43 ^{*}
12. "The Book of Lost Dreams" (Kaiser) – 1:49
13. "Days of Our Lives" (Kaiser, Salazar) – 5:15
14. "The Evening News" (French) – 3:37
15. "The Nearsighted Heron" (Kaiser) – 3:25
16. "Now That I Am Dead" (Blair, French) – 3:27
17. "Hunting Sunsets" (Frith) – 4:14
18. "Killing Jar" (Thompson) – 7:43

^{*} Live recording only available on the 2008 reissue.

== Personnel ==
- John French – drums, vocals
- Fred Frith – bass guitar, violin
- Henry Kaiser – guitar
- Richard Thompson – guitar, vocals

=== Guests ===
- Bob Duskis – whistler
- Catherine Keen – vocals (track 4)
