= Herb Bermann =

- Occupations: Lyricist, screenwriter, actor
- Years active: 1957–present

Herb Bermann is an American lyricist, screenwriter, and actor. He is best known for co-writing the 1967 debut album Safe as Milk for Captain Beefheart and His Magic Band. The second album Strictly Personal featured four of Bermann's songs, though he was uncredited: "Safe As Milk", "Trust Us," "Gimme Dat Harp Boy," and "Kandy Korn"

A screenplay he co-wrote with Dean Stockwell became the inspiration for Neil Young's 1970 album After the Gold Rush.

A book featuring his known and previously unpublished lyrics, The Mystery Man from the Magic Band, was published in 2015 by Brass Tacks Press.

== Selected works ==
=== Discography ===
- Safe as Milk (1967), Captain Beefheart and his Magic Band, Label: Buddah Records, Producers: Richard Perry and Bob Krasnow.
- Strictly Personal (1968) uncredited, Captain Beefheart and his Magic Band, Label: Blue Thumb, Producer: Bob Krasnow.
- Shiny Beast (Bat Chain Puller) (1978), Captain Beefheart and the Magic Band, Label:Warner Bros. (US)/Virgin (UK), Producer:Don Van Vliet, Pete Johnson, One track: "Owed t' Alex"

=== Films ===
- Malibu Song (2006), Director: Natalie Lettner and Werner Hanak, Producer: Eurotrash Productions.

=== Books ===
- The Mystery Man from the Magic Band: Captain Beefheart's Writing Partner Revealed (2015), Herb Bermann, Introduction by John French, Interview by Derek Laskie, Foreword by Alec Baldwin, Publisher: Brass Tacks Press.

== Awards ==
- 1971 Writers Guild of America Award (Outstanding Teleplay) – The Psychiatrist: Par for the Course, producer (Universal Studios/NBC), director Steven Spielberg.
