= Alex St. Clair =

American drummer (1941-2006)

- Born: Alexis Clair Snouffer; September 14, 1941
- Died: January 5, 2006 (aged 64)
- Genre: Rock
- Occupations: Musician, songwriter
- Instruments: Guitar, drums, trumpet
- Years active: 1959–1970s

Alex St. Clair (born Alexis Clair Snouffer; September 14, 1941 – c. January 5, 2006) was an American musician.

Twice guitarist for Captain Beefheart, St. Clair was a contemporary of Frank Zappa and Beefheart at Antelope Valley High School in Lancaster, California, where St. Clair played trumpet and Zappa played drums. They bought their first guitars within days of each other.

St. Clair joined his first band, the Omens, around 1959; Vliet (Beefheart) did occasional vocals with them. St. Clair went to work around Lake Tahoe in 1964. He returned to Lancaster in 1965 and teamed up with Doug Moon, Jerry Handley, and Terry Wimberley in a blues band. After Vliet was invited to sing with them and Vic Mortensen joined as drummer, the first incarnation of the Magic Band was formed. It was around this time that Snouffer changed his name to St. Clair and Vliet changed his to Van Vliet. St. Clair claimed, "We changed our names because the police were after us for smuggling sponges into Nevada."

St. Clair played on the band's first two albums, Safe as Milk (1967) and Strictly Personal (1968). He left the group in June 1968, having become both musically and financially disappointed after a botched European tour. Bill Harkleroad took his place in the band. St Clair returned to the group in 1973 for their Clear Spot tour, and also played on the 1974 album, Unconditionally Guaranteed, before leaving again.

St. Clair returned to music in Denny King's Boogie Band and appears on their album Evil Wind Blowing. He rejoined the Magic Band after the departure of Winged Eel Fingerling, and was with them for the Clear Spot tour of North America and Europe. St. Clair again left the band due to financial problems, as did Zoot Horn Rollo, Rockette Morton and Ed Marimba.

St. Clair was found dead of a heart attack in his apartment at the beginning of 2006.

The Captain Beefheart song "Owed T'Alex", which was written in the mid 1960s, though it was unreleased until the 1978 album Shiny Beast (Bat Chain Puller), was written about St. Clair's trips to Carson City to visit his mother.
