= John French (musician) =

American drummer

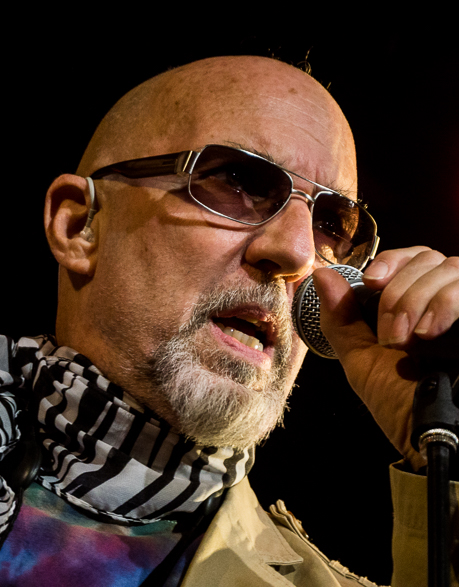
- John French in 2015

Background information
- Born: John Stephen French; 29 September 1948 (age 77); San Bernardino, California, U.S.
- Genres: Rock, blues, experimental rock, avant-garde rock
- Occupations: Musician, songwriter, musical director
- Instruments: Drums; percussion; harmonica; guitar; vocals
- Years active: 1964–present
- Label: Proper/Last Music Co.

John Stephen French (born 29 September 1948) is an American drummer and former member of Captain Beefheart's Magic Band, where he was known by the nickname Drumbo. He was the principal drummer on several of Beefheart's albums, including 1969's Trout Mask Replica, for which he also acted as arranger. He later released several albums as a solo artist as well as with the collaborative group French Frith Kaiser Thompson.

== Early life ==
French grew up in Lancaster, California; the same area of Southern California as Frank Zappa, Don Van Vliet and other members of The Magic Band and The Mothers of Invention. He was interested in the local music scene as a teenager, hanging out with Doug Moon and watching The Omens perform live.

== Playing career ==
Around 1964, he played and recorded with Merrell and The Exiles, a band led by Merrell Fankhauser and featuring Jeff Cotton on guitar. French and Cotton joined Mark Boston in another band in 1966, never recorded, called Blues in a Bottle. Bill Harkleroad aka Zoot Horn Rollo joined later; thus the nucleus of the Trout Mask Replica band was formed.

=== Captain Beefheart and the Magic Band ===
French was invited to join Beefheart and the Magic Band in late 1966, as a replacement for Paul Blakely. Having played on Safe as Milk (1967), his distinctive drumming style moulded the driving heavy psychedelic blues of Strictly Personal (1968) and Mirror Man (1967, but not released till 1971). During the Trout Mask Replica sessions, French transcribed the musical ideas Beefheart played for him on piano for the rest of the band. However, shortly after the completion of Trout Mask Replica, French was booted out of the group rather violently by Beefheart (he was thrown down some stairs), and was replaced by the inexperienced Jeff Bruschell. French was also contentiously omitted from the credits of Trout Mask Replica and was largely absent from the band photos taken for the artwork. Nevertheless, he was soon invited back and played on the critically acclaimed albums Lick My Decals Off, Baby and The Spotlight Kid, sharing percussion duties with Art Tripp aka Ed Marimba. Then in late 1972, just before an American tour, he left again.

Beefheart's contractual problems in 1975 forced French to join Frank Zappa's Bongo Fury tour, but as soon as he was able to, he re-formed The Magic Band as their drummer and music director. 1976 saw the recording of the original version of Bat Chain Puller, which due to legal ownership problems remained unreleased until 2012. French also played guitar as well as drums on some of these songs. He walked out on Beefheart when his friend John Thomas (keyboards) was sacked from the band.

French visited Beefheart in 1980 looking for work and was hired to take part in the recording of Doc at the Radar Station, playing guitar (and drumming on two tracks). He left before the band toured though, when Beefheart handed him a list of 40 songs to learn over a 3-month period. French sealed the walkout the next day by returning the guitar Beefheart had loaned him.

=== Other projects ===
French was briefly involved and co-wrote some songs with Mallard, a group formed by other Magic Band members who left in 1974 after tensions within the band (reportedly caused mainly by Beefheart's domineering, sometimes abusive, behavior) finally reached a breaking point. Following Mallard, John joined Rattlesnakes and Eggs on drums and vocals for an extended stay.

French has subsequently made solo records, and played with the experimental group French Frith Kaiser Thompson and again with Henry Kaiser in Crazy Backwards Alphabet.

In 2000, he was involved in compiling and writing the sleeve notes for the anthology of Beefheart rarities Grow Fins. He also gave his insights into the problems of working with Beefheart in the BBC documentary The Artist Formerly Known as Captain Beefheart.

=== The Magic Band re-formation ===
2003 saw him re-form The Magic Band as a live act with Rockette Morton, Denny Walley, and Gary Lucas. They divided the show into an instrumental and a vocal section. French handled the vocals and harmonica, handing over the drum kit to Robert Williams when he was singing. They released an album, Back to the Front, in 2004 and a live CD, 21st Century Mirror Men, in 2005. The Magic Band continued to tour regularly until 2017.

=== City of Refuge ===
In 2008, French released a solo album (under his "Drumbo" moniker) entitled City of Refuge. The album features other musicians from The Magic Band including John Thomas, Mark Boston (aka Rockette Morton), Bill Harkleroad (aka Zoot Horn Rollo) and Greg Davidson (aka Ella Guru). The album was released on UK label Proper Records.

=== Beefheart: Through the Eyes of Magic ===
In 2010 French released this memoir of his time in the Magic Band (Proper Music Publishing, London).

== Discography ==
=== Captain Beefheart and the Magic Band ===
- 1967 Safe as Milk
- 1968 Strictly Personal
- 1969 Trout Mask Replica
- 1970 Lick My Decals Off, Baby
- 1971 Mirror Man
- 1972 The Spotlight Kid
- 1976 Bat Chain Puller
- 1980 Doc at the Radar Station
- 2000 Grow Fins

=== The Magic Band ===
- 2004 Back to the Front
- 2005 21st Century Mirror Men
- 2011 Performing The Music Of Captain Beefheart - 1: Oxford, U.K. June 6, 2005
- 2013 The Magic Band Plays The Music Of Captain Beefheart - Live In London 2013

=== Solo and collaborations ===
- 1975 Mallard
- 1987 Crazy Backwards Alphabet
- 1987 Live, Love, Larf & Loaf
- 1990 Invisible Means
- 1994 Waiting on the Flame
- 1998 O Solo Drumbo
- 2007 Crazy Backwards Alphabet II
- 2008 City of Refuge
