= Bob Krasnow =

American businessman (1935–2016)

- Born: Robert Alan Krasnow; July 20, 1934; Rochester, New York, U.S.
- Died: December 11, 2016 (aged 82); Wellington, Florida, U.S.
- Occupation: Music executive
- Known for: King Records; Loma Records; Blue Thumb Records; Warner Bros. Records; Elektra Records; Asylum Records; Nonesuch Records
- Spouses: Sandra Lee Marks (m. 1954); Nada Lantz (m. 2002; died 2015)
- Children: 3

Robert Alan Krasnow (July 20, 1934 – December 11, 2016) was an American record label executive and entrepreneur who had a long and successful career in the music industry. He founded Blue Thumb Records, later became chairman of Elektra Records, and was a co-founder of the Rock and Roll Hall of Fame.

== Biography ==
Robert Krasnow was born in Rochester, New York, to Ben Krasnow, a commercial artist (sign painter), and to the former Gertrude Goldstein from Hamilton, Ontario, Canada, both of Russian Jewish parentage.

Krasnow's early career included working as a promotions man for James Brown and sales representative for Decca Records. In the early 1960s, Krasnow founded MK Records, which released the novelty record "Report To The Nation," a parody of the 1960 presidential campaign between John F. Kennedy and Richard M. Nixon.

He ran the King Records branch office in San Francisco from 1958 to 1964 before moving to Warner Bros. Records' R&B label Loma Records, which he headed from 1964 to 1966. During this time he managed and produced records for Ike & Tina Turner. Krasnow became vice president of Kama Sutra Records in Los Angeles in 1966, where he founded the Buddah Records subsidiary label. He discovered, signed and then produced the debut album Safe As Milk by Captain Beefheart.

In 1968 Krasnow left the Kama Sutra/Buddah labels and founded Blue Thumb Records in Beverly Hills, California with producers Don Graham and Tommy LiPuma. The first release on this label was the second Captain Beefheart album Strictly Personal. Krasnow's use of phasing effects on this album is controversial. Beefheart subsequently condemned the production, which he said was done without his knowledge or approval, though it is claimed by other band members that he initially agreed to it.

Among the other acts Krasnow brought to Blue Thumb were Phil Upchurch, Ben Sidran, Gerry Rafferty, Last Poets, The Credibility Gap, The Crusaders, Hugh Masekela, Southwind, Ike & Tina Turner, the Pointer Sisters, Dave Mason, Dan Hicks and His Hot Licks, Marc Bolan & T.Rex, Arthur Lee, Clifton Chenier, Love, Gábor Szabó, Mark-Almond, and John Mayall.

Krasnow served as president of Blue Thumb until 1974, when he became vice president/talent acquisition for Warner Bros. Records, a role he held until 1983 when he was elevated to chairman and CEO of Elektra/Asylum/Nonesuch Records (later known as Elektra Entertainment).

While with Warner and Elektra starting 1984, he signed Chaka Khan, George Benson, Funkadelic, Bootsy Collins, Kraftwerk, Anita Baker, Teddy Pendergrass, Womack & Womack, Public Image Ltd and The Cure to those labels. Krasnow also became known for shelving projects such as Dee Snider's post-Twisted Sister outfit, Desperado, as detailed in Snider's 2012 autobiography, Shut Up and Give Me the Mic.

During this period Krasnow let Queen buy back their rights to their catalogue as he was not a fan of their music. The deal was conducted with the band's manager John Reid, paying $1 million ($3.1 million in 2025 dollars) to have it, they had a backdoor deal already set for $10 million ($31 million in 2025 dollars) with Hollywood Records profiting for $9 million ($27.9 million in 2025 dollars) instantly. This incident went on to sour the relationship between him and Elektra's founder Jac Holzman. Krasnow abruptly resigned from his position at Elektra in July 1994, the result of a bitter internal struggle within the Warner Music group during 1994-95 that also led to the departure of long-serving and highly respected Warner Bros. Records executives Mo Ostin and Lenny Waronker. Following his resignation he established Krasnow Entertainment, a joint venture with the MCA Music Entertainment Group.

In private life, Krasnow has been a member of board of directors of New York City Center (theater for independent choreography); a member of the board of directors and president's council of the Brooklyn Academy of Music; co-president of the French Music Office; national committee member of the March of Dimes; executive vice-president of the Paul Taylor Dance Company; and a member of board of directors of the Wadleigh School and a co-founder of the Rock and Roll Hall of Fame.

Krasnow died on December 11, 2016, in Wellington, Florida, of organ cancer.

== Awards and honors ==
Krasnow's honors include being named the T.J. Martell Foundation Cancer Research Man of the Year in 1984 and 1989; Nordoff-Robbins Music Therapy honoree in 1989; and recipient of the Ellis Island Medal of Honor in 1992.
