= Chrome Dreams =

Studio album by Neil Young
- Released: August 11, 2023
- Recorded: December 13, 1974 – February 6, 1977
- Venue: Hammersmith Odeon
- Studios: Quadrafonic, Nashville; Broken Arrow Ranch, Woodside; Indigo Ranch, Malibu; Point Dume
- Genres: Folk rock; country rock
- Length: 50:28
- Labels: Reprise; Warner
- Producers: Neil Young; David Briggs; Elliot Mazer; Tim Mulligan; Richard Kaplan

Neil Young chronology
World Record (2022)	Chrome Dreams (2023)	Odeon Budokan (2023)

Crazy Horse chronology
World Record (2022)	Chrome Dreams (2023)	Odeon Budokan (2023)

Chrome Dreams is the forty-sixth studio album by Neil Young. It was first compiled as an acetate for consideration as an album for release in 1977. A copy of the acetate widely circulated as a bootleg in the decades prior to its release. The album was officially released on August 11, 2023, to universal acclaim from critics.

== Recording history ==
First compiled in spring 1977, Chrome Dreams is a showcase of songs that Young had recorded over the previous two years. It includes songs from several different sessions with various collaborators and backing musicians. The earliest recording, "Star of Bethlehem", was recorded at the end of 1974 and intended to be the closing track of Homegrown, an abandoned album eventually released in 2020. "Sedan Delivery", recorded during the Zuma sessions, has a slower pace than the Rust Never Sleeps take and contains an additional verse. "Too Far Gone", "Homegrown", "Like a Hurricane", "Look Out for My Love" were all recorded at various sessions at Young's Broken Arrow Ranch with Crazy Horse during the fall and winter after the release of Zuma and before the supporting tour of Europe and Japan in the Spring of 1976. "Too Far Gone" was not released until 1989's Freedom. It is presented on Chrome Dreams with Crazy Horse's Frank "Poncho" Sampedro accompanying Young on a 1917 mandolin.

According to Jimmy McDonough's Shakey: Neil Young's Biography, the piano ballad "Stringman" was written for Jack Nitzsche and is presented as a performance from Young's 1976 European tour with slight studio overdubs. Eighteen years later Young revived it for his Unplugged performance. "Powderfinger", "Pocahontas", and "Captain Kennedy" all date from the August 1976 session featured on the 2017 album Hitchhiker. "Pocahontas" is the same version heard on Rust Never Sleeps without overdubs. "Will to Love" has Young performing before a fireplace at his ranch. He later overdubbed additional instrumentation. The acoustic solo performance of "Hold Back the Tears" has additional lyrics not found on the band recording on American Stars 'n Bars.

== Album history ==
According to Shakey, in 1977 Chrome Dreams was first compiled onto an acetate which was subsequently copied and widely circulated by bootleggers in the 1990s. Chrome Dreams was initially set for a worldwide release on February 4, 1977. This delayed the release of Young’s triple compilation album Decade. The album takes its name from a sketch on a studio tape reel. Young said, "What Chrome Dreams really was, was a sketch that Briggs drew of a grille and front of a '55 Chrysler, and if you turned it on its end, it was this beautiful chick...I called it Chrome Dreams." The 2023 official release has artwork similar to this description, but is credited to musician Ronnie Wood.

On October 23, 2007, Neil Young released a new album titled Chrome Dreams II. On June 30, 2023, he announced that Chrome Dreams would be released on August 11.

== Critical reception ==
Professional ratings
Aggregate scores
Source	Rating
Metacritic	88/100
Review scores
Source	Rating
AllMusic	4.5/5 stars
American Songwriter	4/5 stars
The Arts Desk	4/5 stars
Clash	8/10
Classic Rock	4/5 stars
Mojo	4/5 stars
Paste	9.5/10
Pitchfork	8.5/10
Record Collector	3/5 stars
Uncut	4.5/5 stars

Chrome Dreams received a score of 88 out of 100 on review aggregator Metacritic based on ten critics' reviews, indicating "universal acclaim". Glide Magazine's Doug Collette wrote that "listening to this single collection of so many tracks familiar from the Canadian rock icon's albums in the mid-to-late Seventies, it's hard not to agree with what might otherwise sound like hyperbole: this is one of, if not the finest effort of the great iconoclast's career".

Pitchfork named the album "Best New Reissue", with Stephen Thomas Erlewine stating that "as familiar as the material may be, its ragged, magical charm is greater than the sum of its parts" and it "offers a distinctly different experience than any other Young album from the late 1970s". Fred Thomas of AllMusic felt that "Young devotees are probably already aware of the legacy and niche cultural importance of Chrome Dreams and will appreciate the specifics of the listening experience, even if the songs have become less obscured since they were first put to tape".

Rob Mitchum of Uncut described it as "a dozen of Young's best songs, powerful no matter how many times they've been reshuffled since. But in reality, it risks getting lost in the shotgun spray of Young's self-curation". Writing in The Guardian, Alexis Petridis opined that the album "could have been Young's strongest album of the 70s".

== Track listing ==
1. "Pocahontas" (3:23)
  - Neil Young – guitar, vocal
  - Recorded at Indigo Ranch Recording Studio, Malibu, 8/11/1976 for Hitchhiker.
  - Recording first released with additional overdubs on Rust Never Sleeps in 1979.
2. "Will to Love" (7:11)
  - Neil Young – guitars, vocal, organ, piano, vibraphone, drums
  - Recorded at Broken Arrow Ranch, 4/25/1976 with overdubs at Indigo Ranch Recording Studio, 12/3/1976.
  - Recording first released on American Stars 'n Bars in 1977.
3. "Star of Bethlehem" (2:43)
  - Neil Young – guitar, vocal, harmonica; Ben Keith – dobro, vocal; Tim Drummond – bass; Karl T. Himmel – drums; Emmylou Harris – vocal
  - Recorded at Quadrafonic Sound Studios, Nashville, 12/13/1974 for Homegrown.
  - Recording first released on American Stars 'n Bars in 1977.
4. "Like a Hurricane" (8:21)
  - Neil Young – guitar, vocal; Frank "Poncho" Sampedro – Stringman, vocals; Billy Talbot – bass; Ralph Molina – drums, vocal
  - Recorded at Broken Arrow Ranch, 11/29/1975 with vocal overdub at Village Recorders, Los Angeles, 1/15/1976.
  - Recording first released on American Stars 'n Bars in 1977.
5. "Too Far Gone" (2:44)
  - Neil Young – guitar, vocal; Frank "Poncho" Sampedro – mandolin
  - Recorded at Broken Arrow Ranch, 9/5/1975.
  - Recording first released on Neil Young Archives Volume II: 1972–1976 in 2020.
  - Song first appeared on Freedom in 1989.
6. "Hold Back the Tears" (5:15)
  - Neil Young – guitar, keyboard, percussion, vocal
  - Recorded at Indigo Ranch Recording Studio, Malibu, 2/6/1977.
  - Recording previously unreleased.
  - Song first appeared on American Stars 'n Bars in 1977.
7. "Homegrown" (2:23)
  - Neil Young – guitar, vocal; Frank "Poncho" Sampedro – guitar, vocals; Billy Talbot – bass; Ralph Molina – drums, vocal
  - Recorded at Broken Arrow Ranch, 11/19/1975.
  - Recording first released on American Stars 'n Bars in 1977.
8. "Captain Kennedy" (2:54)
  - Neil Young – guitar, vocal
  - Recorded at Indigo Ranch Recording Studio, Malibu, 8/11/1976 for Hitchhiker.
  - Recording first appeared on Hawks & Doves in 1980.
9. "Stringman" (3:32)
  - Neil Young – piano, guitar, vocal
  - Recorded at Hammersmith Apollo, London, 3/31/1976 with overdubs at CBS Studios, London, 4/1/1976.
  - Recording first released on Neil Young Archives Volume II: 1972–1976 in 2020.
  - Song first appeared on Unplugged in 1993.
10. "Sedan Delivery" (5:21)
  - Neil Young – guitar, vocal; Frank "Poncho" Sampedro – guitar; Billy Talbot – bass, vocal; Ralph Molina – drums, vocal
  - Recorded at house, Point Dume, CA, 5/22/1975 for Zuma.
  - Recording previously unreleased
  - Song first appeared on Rust Never Sleeps in 1979.
11. "Powderfinger" (3:23)
  - Neil Young – guitar, vocal
  - Recorded at Indigo Ranch Recording Studio, Malibu, 8/11/1976 for Hitchhiker.
  - Recording first released on Hitchhiker in 2017.
  - Song first released on Rust Never Sleeps in 1979.
12. "Look Out for My Love" (4:01)
  - Neil Young – guitar, vocal; Frank "Poncho" Sampedro – guitar; Billy Talbot – bass, vocal; Ralph Molina – drums, vocal
  - Recorded at Broken Arrow Ranch, 1/20/1976 with overdubs at CBS Studios, London, 4/1/1976.
  - Recording first released on Comes a Time in 1978.

== Personnel ==
- Neil Young – guitar, organ, piano, keyboard, vibraphone, drums, percussion, harmonica, vocals
- Ben Keith – dobro, vocals
- Frank Sampedro – stringman, guitar, vocals
- Billy Talbot – bass, vocals
- Tim Drummond – bass
- Ralph Molina – drums, vocals
- Karl T. Himmel – drums
- Emmylou Harris – vocals

Additional roles

- David Briggs – production
- Tim Mulligan – production
- Elliot Mazer – production
- Jenice Heo – art direction
- Ronnie Wood – cover art
- Joel Bernstein – inside photography
- Chris Bellman – mastering
- Frank Gironda – direction

== Charts ==
Chart performance for Chrome Dreams
Chart (2023)	Peak position
Austrian Albums (Ö3 Austria)	14
Belgian Albums (Ultratop Flanders)	26
Belgian Albums (Ultratop Wallonia)	25
Dutch Albums (Album Top 100)	33
Finnish Albums (Suomen virallinen lista)	42
French Albums (SNEP)	57
German Albums (Offizielle Top 100)	4
Hungarian Physical Albums (MAHASZ)	14
Italian Albums (FIMI)	96
Portuguese Albums (AFP)	32
Scottish Albums (Official Charts)	7
Spanish Albums (Promusicae)	57
Swedish Albums (Sverigetopplistan)	60
Swiss Albums (Schweizer Hitparade)	4
UK Albums (Official Charts)	56
US Billboard 200	186
US Americana/Folk Albums (Billboard)	10
US Indie Store Album Sales (Billboard)	5
