= Odeon Budokan =

Live album by Neil Young and Crazy Horse
- Released: September 1, 2023
- Recorded: March 1976
- Venue: Hammersmith Odeon, London; Nippon Budokan Hall, Tokyo
- Genre: Folk rock; hard rock
- Length: 43:47
- Label: Reprise
- Producer: Neil Young; David Briggs; Tim Mulligan

Neil Young chronology
| Chrome Dreams (2023) | Odeon Budokan (2023) | Before and After (2023) |

Crazy Horse chronology
| Chrome Dreams (2023) | Odeon Budokan (2023) | Fuckin' Up (2024) |

Odeon Budokan is a live album by Canadian-American musician Neil Young, released on September 1, 2023, on American record label Reprise Records.

The album features recordings from performances from Young's 1976 tour with Crazy Horse in support of Zuma. The tour was Crazy Horse's first with new guitarist Frank Sampedro. The first side features performances from the opening solo acoustic set at the Hammersmith Odeon on March 31, 1976. The second side features performances from the closing full band electric sets at the Nippon Budokan Hall on March 10 and 11, 1976.

== Release ==
The album was first made available on CD in the Archives Volume II boxset released in 2020. The stand-alone 2023 release was made available only on vinyl. The album was nearly released in 2019 in advance of the second volume of Young's Archives series, but the artist chose to release Tuscaloosa instead.

Odeon Budokan was first compiled for release in 1976 by producer David Briggs but was shelved in favor of other projects. It features the then-unreleased songs "Too Far Gone", "Stringman", and "Lotta Love". During the ending of "The Old Laughing Lady", Young sings additional lyrics, titled "Guilty Train", as he often did in 1976.

The Tokyo and London concerts featured on the album were also professionally filmed. A promotional video was made of the band performing "Like a Hurricane" in front of a wind machine at the Hammersmith Odeon. The video was presented on the television series The Midnight Special on June 10, 1977. A video compilation of several other performances from the concerts has also appeared on bootlegs, with a different track list than the album. Two additional acoustic songs from the concerts appear on Disc 9 of Archives Volume II, "Midnight on the Bay" and a banjo take of "Mellow My Mind". The day after the live performance, overdubs were recorded in CBS Studios in London for "Stringman", which nearly saw release on Chrome Dreams in 1977.

== Performances ==
Both sides of the album show Young and the band in good spirits. Responding to shouts of song requests from the audience during the solo set, Young responds that the audience should "elect a leader" to represent the group and agree on a single request. The second, electric side begins with the band and the audience making howls and other dog noises.

In interviews, the band recalls the tour fondly. In a 1979 interview for Rolling Stone, bassist Billy Talbot remembered: "We played England, Japan, everywhere except America. It was an idyllic time, man, Neil was just sparkling. We had a band again. I heard us playing like I knew nobody else could play. I just kept thinking...have we got a band or what? I don’t think we’ve come down from that tour yet. I have this tape from Japan. Compared to this tape, Zuma sounds like a bunch of guys sleeping in big, fat armchairs, smoking pipes. Whenever I feel down, I listen to that tape." Guitarist Frank "Poncho" Sampedro added, "Some shows Neil gets crazy with the guitar. Way crazy." Sampedro recalled the reception of fans in Shakey: "Japan was unbelievable. They greeted us like the Beatles."

In a 2020 Uncut interview with Michael Bonner, Sampedro recounts hallucinating during the March 11th performance in Japan: "Billy and I took acid at the last show at the Budokan. I said 'Don't tell anybody, just me and you, dude.' He continues in a 2020 Aquarium Drunkard interview: "Billy and I both dropped acid because that night, after the show, we were flying to Copenhagen. We didn't want to carry any drugs with us and I had these two tabs of acid. We each took one. It was so funny...everything was starting to get crazy. Psychedelic patterns and shit flying around. I didn’t talk to anybody all night on-stage. I kept my eyes closed most of the time. Only a couple of times I opened them. The first time was horrific. I hit my guitar strings and I saw them bounce off the floor and up to the ceiling in rainbow colors. I was just like, 'Oh, shit.' I kept feeling them on my arm! The vibrations coming off the strings. "We did 'Cowgirl in the Sand' and Billy and Ralph went up to sing the backgrounds. I opened my eyes and saw big mandalas comin' out of the back of both their heads, all these colors and shit. I couldn't even look up, I was so high. I'd hit the strings of my guitar: they were like eighty different colors, and they bounced off the floors and hit the ceiling. At the end of the second song Neil came runnin' over, stuck his head between me and Billy and goes, 'Man, we're psychedelic tonight!' I just looked at Billy, thinkin', 'He told him, he told him.' The whole rest of the night I don’t even think we made a mistake. It was unbelievable."

== Critical reception ==
Professional ratings
Review scores
| Source | Rating |
|---|---|
| AllMusic | 4/5 stars |

Allmusic rates the album with four out of five stars, saying that the album stands out among Young's archival releases, exemplifying how Young was operating at full force in multiple directions in the mid-70s.

== Track listing ==
All songs written by Neil Young.

Side one
| No. | Title | Length |
|---|---|---|
| 1. | "The Old Laughing Lady" | 5:55 |
| 2. | "After the Gold Rush" | 4:29 |
| 3. | "Too Far Gone" | 3:17 |
| 4. | "Old Man" | 3:48 |
| 5. | "Stringman" | 3:45 |

Side two
| No. | Title | Length |
|---|---|---|
| 6. | "Don't Cry No Tears" | 3:12 |
| 7. | "Cowgirl in the Sand" | 4:56 |
| 8. | "Lotta Love" | 2:57 |
| 9. | "Drive Back" | 4:37 |
| 10. | "Cortez the Killer" | 7:04 |

== Personnel ==
- Neil Young – guitar, piano, harmonica, vocal

Crazy Horse

- Frank "Poncho" Sampedro – guitar, vocal
- Billy Talbot – bass, vocal
- Ralph Molina – drums, vocal

Additional roles

- David Briggs – production
- Toshi Onuki – art direction & design
- Jenice Heo – art direction & design
- L.A. Johnson – production
- John Hanlon – production
- Tim Mulligan – digital editing, mastering, production
- Will Mitchell – audio production assistance
- Jeff Pinn – mixing, technical support
- John Hausmann – engineering
- Mike Schaff – technical support
- Harry Sitam – technical support
- Chris Bellman – mastering

== Charts ==
Chart performance for Odeon Budokan
| Chart (2023) | Peak position |
|---|---|
| German Albums (Offizielle Top 100) | 45 |
| Hungarian Physical Albums (MAHASZ) | 28 |
| Scottish Albums (OCC) | 24 |
| US Top Current Album Sales (Billboard) | 55 |
