= Greatest Hits (Neil Young album) =

Greatest hits album by Neil Young
- Released: November 16, 2004
- Recorded: 1969–1992
- Studio: Various
- Genre: Rock; country rock; folk rock; hard rock
- Length: 76:07
- Label: Reprise
- Producer: David Briggs; Neil Young; Crosby, Stills, Nash & Young; Kendall Pacios; Elliot Mazer; Henry Lewy; Tim Mulligan; Ben Keith; Niko Bolas

Neil Young chronology
Greendale (2003)	Greatest Hits (2004)	Prairie Wind (2005)

Professional ratings
Review scores
Source	Rating
AllMusic	5/5 stars
Pitchfork	8.0/10

Greatest Hits is Neil Young's third compilation album after Decade and Lucky Thirteen. Eleven of the first twelve tracks appear on Decade, and the disc spans his solo career from 1969 through 1992. On the rear cover of the album, Young comments that the tracks were selected "based on original record sales, airplay and known download history".

== Mastering ==
All tracks on this album were mastered using the HDCD process, which Young had been utilizing for his studio work since 1995. The album was also released as a high-resolution DVD Video disc with 24bit 96 kHz audio, and in a two-disc format including the audio album plus a bonus DVD with videos for "Rockin' in the Free World" and "Harvest Moon". Extensive notes on the remastering process can be found on Young's website.

On the press release, Young said:

One of the most important jobs of any musician is to provide quality sound to the people. Quality has taken a hit in recent years, but it's starting to come back thanks to DVD-stereo. There is just no comparison between DVD-stereo and a regular compact disc or even 5.1 sound. It's the difference between a true reflection of the music and a mere replica. I've always been a strong believer in analogue and this is about as close to the rewarding listening experience of vinyl as the real thing.

== Track listing ==
Track listing for Greatest Hits
#	Title	Writer(s)	Performed by	Length	Album
1.	"Down by the River"	Neil Young	Neil Young with Crazy Horse	9:16	Everybody Knows This Is Nowhere, 1969
2.	"Cowgirl in the Sand"	Young	Neil Young with Crazy Horse	10:05	Everybody Knows This Is Nowhere, 1969
3.	"Cinnamon Girl"	Young	Neil Young with Crazy Horse	2:59	Everybody Knows This Is Nowhere, 1969
4.	"Helpless"	Young	Crosby, Stills, Nash & Young	3:37	Déjà Vu, 1970
5.	"After the Gold Rush"	Young	Neil Young	3:46	After the Gold Rush, 1970
6.	"Only Love Can Break Your Heart"	Young	Neil Young	3:08	After the Gold Rush, 1970
7.	"Southern Man"	Young	Neil Young	5:31	After the Gold Rush, 1970
8.	"Ohio"	Young	Crosby, Stills, Nash & Young	2:59	Non-album single, 1970; made first album appearance on So Far, 1974
9.	"The Needle and the Damage Done"	Young	Neil Young	2:10	Harvest, 1972
10.	"Old Man"	Young	Neil Young with The Stray Gators	3:22	Harvest, 1972
11.	"Heart of Gold"	Young	Neil Young with The Stray Gators	3:07	Harvest, 1972
12.	"Like a Hurricane"	Young	Neil Young and Crazy Horse	8:20	American Stars 'n Bars, 1977
13.	"Comes a Time"	Young	Neil Young	3:04	Comes a Time, 1978
14.	"Hey Hey, My My (Into the Black)"	Young	Neil Young and Crazy Horse	4:59	Rust Never Sleeps, 1979
15.	"Rockin' in the Free World"	Young	Neil Young	4:41	Freedom, 1989
16.	"Harvest Moon"	Young	Neil Young with The Stray Gators	5:03	Harvest Moon, 1992

=== 7" single ===
Track listing for bonus 7"
#	Title	Writer(s)	Performed by	Length	Album
1.	"The Loner"	Young	Neil Young	3:50	Neil Young, 1968
2.	"Sugar Mountain"	Young	Neil Young	5:41	Non-album B-side to "The Loner", 1969

Issued exclusively with the vinyl edition of the album

== Personnel ==
- Neil Young – guitars, pipe organ, vocals
- Danny Whitten, David Crosby – electric guitar, vocals
- Billy Talbot, Joe Osborne, Calvin "Fuzzy" Samuel, Greg Reeves, Rick Rosas, Jim Messina – bass
- Ralph Molina – drums, vocals
- Stephen Stills – guitar, piano, vocals
- Graham Nash – acoustic guitar, vocals
- Dallas Taylor, John Barbata, Chad Cromwell, Kenny Buttrey, Karl Himmel, George Grantham – drums
- Bill Peterson – flugelhorn
- Nils Lofgren, Andy McMahon – piano
- Ben Keith – pedal steel guitar, keyboards
- Spooner Oldham – piano, organ
- Tim Drummond – bass, broom
- Linda Ronstadt, Nicolette Larson – vocals
- James Taylor – banjo guitar, vocals
- Teddy Irwin – guitar
- J.J. Cale – electric guitar
- Frank Sampedro – stringman
- Rufus Thibodeaux – fiddle
- Farrel Morris – percussion
- Rita Fey – autoharp
- Also – acoustic guitarists and string players on "Comes a Time"

Additional roles

- Joel Bernstein – cover photo
- Gary Burden, Jenice Heo – art direction & design (R. Twerk)
- Toshi Onuki, L.A. Johnson, Neil Young – art direction & design (Shakey Pictures)
- Tim Mulligan – mastering
- John Hausmann, Harry Sitam – engineering
- Elliot Roberts – direction

== Charts ==
=== Weekly charts ===
2004 weekly chart peaks for Greatest Hits
Chart (2004)	Peak position
Austrian Albums (Ö3 Austria)	45
Belgian Albums (Ultratop Wallonia)	86
Dutch Albums (Album Top 100)	49
Finnish Albums (Suomen virallinen lista)	24
French Albums (SNEP)	174
Finnish Albums (Suomen virallinen lista)	24
German Albums (Offizielle Top 100)	41
Irish Albums (IRMA)	8
New Zealand Albums (RMNZ)	3
Norwegian Albums (VG-lista)	10
Swedish Albums (Sverigetopplistan)	13
UK Albums (OCC)	45
US Billboard 200	27

2005 weekly chart peaks for Greatest Hits
Chart (2005)	Peak position
Australian Albums (ARIA)	25
Belgian Albums (Ultratop Flanders)	24

=== Year-end charts ===
2005 year-end chart performance for Greatest Hits
Chart (2005)	Position
Australian Albums (ARIA)	86
US Billboard 200	186

== Certifications ==
Certifications for Greatest Hits
Region	Certification	Certified units/sales
Australia (ARIA)	Platinum	70,000^{^}
Belgium (BRMA)	Gold	25,000^{*}
Canada (Music Canada)	Gold	50,000^{^}
Germany (BVMI)	Gold	100,000^{^}
Ireland (IRMA)	Platinum	15,000^{^}
Italy (FIMI)	Gold	25,000^{*}
New Zealand (RMNZ)	2× Platinum	30,000^{^}
United Kingdom (BPI)	Platinum	300,000^{^}
United States (RIAA)	Gold	500,000^{^}
Summaries
Europe (IFPI)	Platinum	1,000,000^{*}
^{*} Sales figures based on certification alone.^{^} Shipments figures based on certification alone.
