= Homegrown (Neil Young album) =

Studio album by Neil Young
- Released: June 19, 2020
- Recorded: June, September, December 1974; January 1975
- Studios: Quadrafonic, Nashville; Broken Arrow Ranch, Redwood City; Village Recorders, Los Angeles; Ramport, London
- Genres: Country rock; folk rock
- Length: 35:23
- Label: Reprise
- Producers: Neil Young; Elliot Mazer; Ben Keith; Tim Mulligan

Neil Young chronology
Colorado (2019)	Homegrown (2020)	The Times (2020)

Homegrown is the forty-second studio album by Canadian-American Neil Young. It was released on June 19, 2020, by Reprise Records. The album consists of material recorded between June 1974 and January 1975. The album was recorded after the release of On the Beach and before the sessions for Zuma. Like those two albums, much of the material was inspired by Young's relationship with actress Carrie Snodgress, which was deteriorating in 1974. The album was compiled and prepared for release in 1975. Instead, Tonight's the Night was released, and Homegrown remained unreleased for 45 years. It was finally set for release as part of Record Store Day 2020, amid Neil Young's ongoing Archives campaign. Its release was again delayed by Record Store Day's postponement due to the COVID-19 pandemic, before finally seeing release on June 19.

== Background ==
Around 30 songs are reported to have been recorded between June 1974 and January 1975, many of which can be seen in handwritten lists shown on Neil Young Archives, as several track lists were assembled before the album was canceled. The material from these sessions is largely acoustic, most of it being solo performances of Young on guitar and harmonica. Young has said that "Homegrown is the missing link between Harvest, Comes a Time, Old Ways and Harvest Moon." The songs are quite personal, and reveal much of his feelings on his failing relationship at the time with actress Carrie Snodgress. "It was a little too personal... it scared me," Young would later explain to Cameron Crowe in interview.

It was so near to being released that a cover had been created. At the last moment however, Young chose to drop Homegrown and release instead Tonight's the Night, another shelved album recorded in 1973. Young stated that he had a playback party for Homegrown and Tonight's the Night happened to be on the same reel. He decided to release Tonight's the Night after that listening because of "its overall strength in performance and feeling" and because Homegrown "was just a very down album."

== Writing ==
Although Young had dozens of songs available to him at the time for a new album, the songs selected for the running order generally center around the theme of his collapsing relationship with Carrie Snodgress.

In "Separate Ways" Young sings about his final separation from Carrie, despite sharing a child together. In response to a fan letter on his website, Young states the song was intended to have backing vocals, but they were never recorded. Young would revisit the song in a more soulful arrangement in studio with Stephen Stills' backing band for 1976's Long May You Run and again on his 1993 tour with Booker T & the MGs.

The lyrics to "Try" incorporate phrases that Carrie's mother used to like to say., including the phrase 'I'd like to take a chance/but shit, Mary, I can't dance.' Carrie's mother had died shortly before the sessions of suicide.

"Love Is a Rose" is a reworking of Young's previous concert encore favorite "Dance, Dance, Dance". It was also recorded by Crazy Horse on their debut album. "Love Is a Rose" features new lyrics and would later be covered by Linda Ronstadt. Young would include "Love Is a Rose" on the 1977 compilation Decade., where Young describes it in the liner notes as having been "written in a car on my way to Hana, Maui from the airport. Recorded at the ranch during rehearsals for the CSNY '74 reunion tour. Later done up well by Linda Ronstadt, a soulful girl with big brown eyes."

"Homegrown" is a straightforward tribute to smoking marijuana. Young would rerecord the song with Crazy Horse in 1975 for the album American Stars 'n Bars.

"Florida" is a narrated nightmare accompanied by the cacophonous sound of Young and Keith rubbing the rims of wine glasses and playing with piano strings. A booklet that accompanied the original vinyl release of Tonight's the Night featured the lyrics superimposed over the credits for On the Beach.

"Kansas" and "Mexico" are described in Shakey as "solo Young performances—short, fragmentary and hallucinogenic." The lyrics to "Kansas" describe the relief of having a lover by your side after waking up from a nightmare.

Young remembers writing "White Line" in a 2018 post to his website: "I wrote "White Line" in the back of Pearl on the CSNY 1974 stadium tour. Joel Bernstein, friend, archivist and photographer, believes I am seen typing the original in this photo. He compared the typewritten page in the archives with this picture and identified the song as "White Line", a love song about traveling away from the pain." Young re-recorded the song without the verse containing the drug-referencing title with Crazy Horse in 1975 during the American Stars 'n' Bars sessions and again with the group in 1990 for Ragged Glory.

"Vacancy" was written in Amsterdam shortly after the last CSNY tour date at Wembley. Its guitar riff evolved from Young's rhythm guitar part for Stills' "Black Queen"

"Little Wing" would see release in 1980 on Hawks & Doves. Young would also play "Little Wing" in a different arrangement with The Ducks in 1977.

"Star of Bethlehem", which concludes the album, is about coming to terms with the end of a relationship. Young would debut the song on tour with CSNY with an additional verse. According to a post on the Neil Young Archives website, Ben Keith and Emmylou Harris would overdub vocals to the track at Harris' L.A. home. In a 1975 Cameron Crowe interview for Rolling Stone, Young indicated a desire to release parts of Homegrown on subsequent albums, citing, for example, the "beautiful harmonies" of Emmylou Harris. "Star of Bethlehem" would first see release on American Stars 'n Bars in 1977.

== Recording ==
The album's songs were recorded between June 1974 and January 1975 at various locations. Dedicated recording sessions were held in December 1974 at Quadrafonic Studios in Nashville with Elliot Mazer producing, repeating the context in which Harvest was recorded. While its predecessor features songs inspired by the beginning of Young's relationship with Carrie Snodgress, Homegrown features songs inspired by the end of that relationship. 1974 was a prolific time for Young as a writer, writing both the dozen songs that were slated for Homegrown as well as many others that would be sprinkled throughout his 1970s albums or go unreleased until 2020's Neil Young Archives Volume II: 1972–1976.

In July, CSNY embarked on a stadium tour of North America, their first since the 1970 tour that featured on 4 Way Street. To prepare, the band convened at Young's Northern California ranch to rehearse their sprawling repertoire. During the rehearsals, Young recorded several new songs on June 15 as a solo performer, on the 16th with bassist Tim Drummond, and on the 17th with Crosby, Stills and Nash.

On June 15, Young recorded solo demos of "Love Is a Rose", "The Old Homestead", "Love/Art Blues", "Through My Sails" and "Barefoot Floors". The lullaby "Barefoot Floors" was first released in 2021 on Young's website. It was also covered by Nicolette Larson on her album Sleep, Baby, Sleep. The lyrics to "Love/Art Blues" lament the tension between Young's personal and creative priorities in life. He told Constant Meijers, "Those girls always get jealous when you're working on something with great intensity."

On the 16th, Young returned to his home studio with bassist Tim Drummond. That day he recorded at least eight songs, including master takes of "Homefires" and "Love Is a Rose". He performed the songs right after each other, in front of a roaring fire. He also recorded the backing track to "Pardon My Heart", which saw additional overdubs before release on the 1975 album Zuma. He also attempted "Love/Art Blues", "New Mama" and "The Old Homestead". The confessional solo piano piece "L.A. Girls and Ocean Boys" was also recorded that day. Its lyrics were interpolated into "Danger Bird" on Zuma. Young also recorded the newly written "Hawaiian Sunrise" with Drummond. Young remembers writing the song during the rehearsals in his memoir Special Deluxe:

"At the ranch, while rehearsing for the tour, I wrote a new song called "Hawaiian Sunrise." It seemed like every day I had another new song. With all the changes going on in my life, I wrote songs daily, turning the changes into something. I always looked at occasions in life as inspirations for songs. We were singing so easily. It was flowing. We were all high on weed and excited. Crosby called up Peter Fonda, and we sang "Hawaiian Sunrise" for him over the phone from my cabin living room, all four of us. It was the best we ever sang it. To this day, I'm sorry we weren't recording it. That is one of the biggest lessons I have learned about recording music. 'Get it while it's hot.' Every song has its moment, and we let that one escape into a telephone."

On June 17, Young recorded with CSNY, producing the take of "Through My Sails" that ended up on Zuma. The group helped Young with a new arrangement of "New Mama", made an attempt at "Love/Art Blues", and recorded additional vocals for the previous day's take of "Hawaiian Sunrise".

During the 1974 CSNY tour, Young debuted 17 new songs on stage. Two days before the group's performance at Wembley Stadium, Young recorded another new song, "White Line", with the Band's Robbie Robertson. It was recorded at Ramport Studios in London on September 12, 1974. The Band had served as one of CSNY's opening acts during their summer tour. The duo recorded the song on acoustic guitars, with Robertson providing flourishes to complement Young's playing.

After the CSNY tour, Young traveled to Amsterdam for a week and a half in late September/early October with Graham Nash, Joel Bernstein, and Dutch journalist Constant Meijers. He worked on the songs "Vacancy" and "Frozen Man", and expressed to Meijers his excitement about his wealth of new material and an eagerness to play his new songs and begin recording. He mused that many of the songs share a water theme, and contemplated recording in Ibiza or Monaco using a mobile studio:

"I've been working on one song after the other, lately. I've got 37 new songs and I'd love to play them. Do you think it's possible? Is there a folk-club or something, where I could play incognito? I'm feeling great lately, thanks to CSN&Y. Everything went well this time. We're finished now, but I have a feeling that we'll be back together again in 18 months time. In the meantime, I want to put a band together to play my new songs. I always want to bring something new, like Tonight's The Night. I want to make a fresh start with those 37 songs, like a new artist, with a new repertoire. I want to record here too. I've sent postcards back to America saying I'll disappear for an unknown period of time."

Young abandoned plans to record in Europe and return to his California ranch. Young recorded several demos during a November 11 session at Broken Arrow Ranch with Tim Mulligan. Many of these songs reflect his heartbreak at the breakdown of his relationship with Snodgress. Takes of "Vacancy", "One More Sign", "Frozen Man", "Give Me Strength", and "Bad News Comes to Town" all eventually appeared on Neil Young Archives Vol. II. "Give Me Strength" featured vocals from Ellen Talbot, a friend of Snodgress and the sister-in-law of bassist Billy Talbot, who lived on Young's ranch as a caretaker for Zeke. "Give Me Strength" would eventually see release on 2017's Hitchhiker in a 1976 recording. Young also revisited "Bad News Comes to Town", this time with a horn section, during his 1988 tour with the Blue Notes, captured live on 2015's Bluenote Café.

During the first week of December, Young traveled to Chicago to attend the funeral of Carrie's mother. While there, he booked time at Chess Records where he attempted to record "Changing Highways" and "Vacancy" with a reformed Crazy Horse with new guitarist Frank Sampedro. Young remembers in Waging Heavy Peace: "When we all got to Chess Studios, we found it on the fifth floor of a big old brick building that really had a historic vibe. I felt I was in a hallowed place. It was funky and there was nothing high-class about it, like some of the studios we had played in Hollywood. It had everything it needed, though. We recorded one song, "Changing Highways," at that session. It was kind of an experiment with Poncho in the studio, and it went well. We rocked." Sampedro recalls in a 2021 interview: "We went to Chess and it was very cool place. And you know, I was a huge Chuck Berry fan. Just to be there was like, wow, you know? The other one we did at Chess was "Vacancy". When I heard Ben and those Nashville cats do it, it kind of tickled me because they did a good job and I like it. I love the song. But our version was so much more out of control and just bashing and crazy. All those little turnarounds at the end of the verses just kind of got lost in ours because it was just distortion and craziness going on."

Studio sessions for Homegrown began in earnest in mid-December 1974 at Quadraphonic Sound Studios in Nashville. Young remembers the setting in Special Deluxe:

"We set up at Quadrafonic Sound on Sixteenth Avenue, with Elliot Mazer at the board. Quad was a little studio, built in a house, like many studios in Nashville, with an intimate feel and sound. It was a favorite among singer-songwriters like myself. The first day there, we recorded with Kenny Buttrey on drums, Tim Drummond on bass, Ben Keith on steel, and me on acoustic guitar. These musicians were known as the Stray Gators on the Harvest album and were all soulful, first-class players. Drummond had played with James Brown, Conway Twitty, and others. Ben had played with Patsy Cline, Hawkshaw Hawkins, and many more. Buttrey had given his beat to Roy Orbison, the Everly Brothers, and countless country artists and hits. I was fortunate to be in their company. We recorded a song called "Frozen Man," which I had written in Amsterdam.

On December 11, Levon Helm replaced Buttrey and the group recorded "The Old Homestead" and "Daughters", as well as the two songs that open Homegrown, "Separate Ways" and "Try". "The Old Homestead" was released on Hawks & Doves in 1980.

Another band session at the same studio on December 13, this time with Karl Himmel on drums, yielded "Star of Bethlehem", "Homegrown" and "Deep Forbidden Lake". "Deep Forbidden Lake" was released on Decade in 1977 where Young says in the liner notes that "it hopefully signified the end of a long dark period which started with Time Fades Away." "Bad News Comes to Town", "Frozen Man" and several versions of "Changing Highways" were also recorded during these sessions at Quadrafonic.

Later that month, "We Don't Smoke It No More" and another attempt at "Love/Art Blues" were recorded with his band at Broken Arrow on December 31, 1974. Four days later, the group captured a heavier, electric version of "Vacancy". Versions of "Long May You Run", "Barefoot Floors" and "Motorcycle Mama" were also recorded during these sessions. "Motorcycle Mama", written for his new romantic interest and eventual wife Pegi, were later recorded for 1978's Comes a Time.

Final sessions took place at Village Recorder Studios in L.A. on January 21, 1975. This time the material consisted of short solo pieces featuring Young on guitar or piano. Among the songs recorded are "Little Wing", "Mexico", "Kansas" and the spoken-word track "Florida".

== Release ==
In 2010, Neil Young's on-line newspaper stated that Homegrown along with other period unreleased albums were being "rebuilt" for inclusion in the second volume of his Archives project. Unlike similar unreleased collections from this period of Young's career, such as Chrome Dreams and the session acetates for Tonight's the Night, Homegrown never circulated in whole as a bootleg.

In July 2019, Neil Young Archives' mastering team began working on the original master tapes. The official site for Neil Young Archives shows several pictures of the tape boxes and respective handwritten notes, revealing much of the work that was required to create new analog masters using the original as a source. Safety copies were also used to substitute for the bits where the original tapes were damaged.

On November 21, 2019, an article was posted to Neil Young's Archives website announcing Homegrown as the first vinyl release scheduled for 2020. The article also included a short video of engineer John Hanlon overseeing an all-analog transfer of one of the album's songs ("We Don't Smoke It No More").

The album was released on June 19, 2020. "Try" was released as a single exclusively to the Neil Young's Archives website on May 13, 2020, followed by "Vacancy" on June 10, 2020.

The original release date of April 18, 2020 had to be delayed due to the COVID-19 pandemic.

== Critical reception ==
Professional ratings
Aggregate scores
Source	Rating
AnyDecentMusic?	8.2/10
Metacritic	88/100
Review scores
Source	Rating
AllMusic	4.5/5 stars
American Songwriter	3.5/5 stars
Clash	9/10
Consequence of Sound	B
DIY	4/5 stars
Exclaim!	8/10
MusicOMH	3.5/5 stars
NME	5/5 stars
Pitchfork	8.8/10
Rolling Stone	4.5/5 stars

Homegrown was met with universal acclaim from music critics. At Metacritic, which assigns a weighted average rating out of 100 to reviews from mainstream publications, this release received an average score of 88, based on 17 reviews.

Writing for The A.V. Club, Alex McLevy praised the release, writing that it is "no less masterful for having sat unheard all these years. If anything, the passing time has helped intensify the lush intimacy of the recordings, making Young’s spare and rich instrumentation (and old-school minimalist production) stand out all the more in an era of auto-tuned digitalization."

== Track listing ==
=== Side one ===
1. "Separate Ways" (3:33)
  - Neil Young – guitar, vocal, harmonica; Ben Keith – pedal steel; Tim Drummond – bass; Levon Helm – drums
  - Recorded at Quadrafonic Sound Studio, Nashville, 12/11/1974. Produced by Neil Young & Elliot Mazer.
2. "Try" (2:47)
  - Neil Young – guitar, vocal; Ben Keith – pedal steel, vocal; Tim Drummond – bass; Levon Helm – drums; Emmylou Harris – vocal; Joe Yankee – piano
  - Recorded at Quadrafonic Sound Studios, Nashville, 12/11/1974. Produced by Neil Young & Elliot Mazer.
3. "Mexico" (1:40)
  - Neil Young – piano, vocal
  - Recorded at Village Recorders, Los Angeles, 1/21/1975. Produced by Neil Young & Ben Keith.
4. "Love Is a Rose" (2:16)
  - Neil Young – guitar, vocal, harmonica; Tim Drummond – bass
  - Recorded at Studio, Broken Arrow Ranch, Woodside, CA, 6/16/1974. Produced by Neil Young & Tim Mulligan.
5. "Homegrown" (2:47)
  - Neil Young – guitar, vocal; Ben Keith – lap slide guitar; Tim Drummond – bass; Karl T. Himmel – drums
  - Recorded at Quadrafonic Sound Studios, Nashville, 12/13/1974. Produced by Neil Young & Elliot Mazer.
6. "Florida" (2:58)
  - Neil Young – wine glass, piano strings, vocal; Ben Keith – wine glass, piano strings, narration
  - Recorded at Village Recorders, Los Angeles, 1/21/1975. Produced by Neil Young & Ben Keith.
7. "Kansas" (2:12)
  - Neil Young – guitar, vocal, harmonica
  - Recorded at Village Recorders, Los Angeles, 1/21/1975. Produced by Neil Young & Ben Keith.

=== Side two ===
1. "We Don't Smoke It No More" (4:50)
  - Neil Young – guitar, vocal, harmonica; Ben Keith – lap slide guitar, vocal; Tim Drummond – bass; Karl T. Himmel – drums; Stan Szelest – piano; Sandy Mazzeo – vocal
  - Recorded at Studio, Broken Arrow Ranch, Woodside, CA, 12/31/1974. Produced by Neil Young, Ben Keith & Tim Mulligan.
2. "White Line" (3:14)
  - Neil Young – guitar, vocal, harmonica; Robbie Robertson – guitar
  - Recorded at Ramport Studios, London, 9/12/1974. Produced by Neil Young & Elliot Mazer.
3. "Vacancy" (3:59)
  - Neil Young – guitar, vocal, harmonica; Ben Keith – lap slide guitar, vocal; Tim Drummond – bass; Karl T. Himmel – drums; Stan Szelest – Wurlitzer electric piano
  - Recorded at Studio, Broken Arrow Ranch, Woodside, CA, 1/4/1975. Produced by Neil Young, Ben Keith & Tim Mulligan.
4. "Little Wing" (2:10)
  - Neil Young – guitar, vocal, harmonica
  - Recorded at Village Recorders, Los Angeles, 1/21/1975. Produced by Neil Young & Ben Keith.
5. "Star of Bethlehem" (2:42)
  - Neil Young – guitar, vocal, harmonica; Ben Keith – dobro, vocal; Tim Drummond – bass; Karl T. Himmel – drums; Emmylou Harris – vocal
  - Recorded at Quadrafonic Sound Studios, Nashville, 12/13/1974. Produced by Neil Young & Elliot Mazer.

== Personnel ==
- Neil Young – guitar (1–2, 4–5, 7–12), harmonica (1, 4, 7–12), piano (2–3), wine glass (6), piano strings (6), narration (6), vocals (1–5, 7–12), production
- Ben Keith – pedal steel guitar (1–2), lap slide guitar (5, 8, 10), Dobro (12), wine glass (6), piano strings (6), narration (6), vocals (2, 8, 10, 12), production (3, 6–8, 10–11)
- Tim Drummond – bass (1–2, 4–5, 8, 10, 12), vocals (8, 10)
- Levon Helm – drums (1–2)
- Karl T. Himmel – drums (5, 8, 10, 12)
- Robbie Robertson – guitar (9)
- Emmylou Harris – backing vocals (2, 12)
- Sandy Mazzeo – backing vocals (8)
- Stan Szelest – piano (8), Wurlitzer piano (10)

Additional roles

- Elliot Mazer – production (1–2, 5, 12)
- Tim Mulligan – production (4, 8–10)
- John Hanlon – assembly, pre-mastering, restoration
- Tom Wilkes – cover art
- Henry Diltz – back cover photo
- Alex Tenta – design
- Chris Bellman – mastering
- Elliot Roberts – direction

== Charts ==
=== Weekly charts ===
Weekly chart performance for Homegrown
Chart (2020)	Peak position
Australian Albums (ARIA)	17
Austrian Albums (Ö3 Austria)	3
Belgian Albums (Ultratop Flanders)	4
Belgian Albums (Ultratop Wallonia)	8
Canadian Albums (Billboard)	51
Danish Albums (Hitlisten)	4
Dutch Albums (Album Top 100)	2
Finnish Albums (Suomen virallinen lista)	3
French Albums (SNEP)	12
German Albums (Offizielle Top 100)	4
Hungarian Albums (MAHASZ)	6
Irish Albums (Official Charts)	2
Italian Albums (FIMI)	10
New Zealand Albums (RMNZ)	5
Norwegian Albums (VG-lista)	2
Portuguese Albums (AFP)	7
Scottish Albums (Official Charts)	2
Spanish Albums (Promusicae)	62
Swedish Albums (Sverigetopplistan)	6
Swiss Albums (Schweizer Hitparade)	2
UK Albums (Official Charts)	2
US Billboard 200	17
US Americana/Folk Albums (Billboard)	2
US Top Rock Albums (Billboard)	3
US Indie Store Album Sales (Billboard)	1

=== Year-end charts ===
Year-end chart performance for Homegrown
Chart (2020)	Position
Belgian Albums (Ultratop Flanders)	121
