= Will to Love =

Song by Neil Young

- Cover to promo single backed by "Cortez the Killer"

Song by Neil Young

from the album American Stars 'N Bars
- Released: May 27, 1977
- Recorded: April 25 and December 3, 1976
- Studio: Neil Young's home, California
- Genre: Rock
- Length: 7:11
- Label: Reprise
- Songwriter: Neil Young
- Producers: Neil Young; David Briggs; Tim Mulligan

"Will to Love" is a song written by Neil Young that was first released on his 1977 album American Stars 'N Bars. A promotional single of "Will to Love" was released, backed with a live performance of "Cortez the Killer."

== Background ==
"Will to Love" had been intended for Young's unreleased Chrome Dreams album. He recorded the song alone in a single take on a two-track cassette tape, sitting in front of a fireplace playing acoustic guitar. He used a fader and applied stereo vibrato to achieve a fish sound. He also overdubbed percussion, bass and vibraphone himself. He claims to have mixed the song the same night he recorded it and it was completed in about 8 hours.

Young claims to have never sung the song again after the initial recording. He has stated that he is unable to sing it again since he can't remember the melody, since all the verses came out differently. But according to music journalist Nigel Williamson, Young did rehearse the song for Long May You Run, his 1976 collaboration with Stephen Stills, but gave up on re-recording it because he felt it wasn't coming out right. According to Theodore Gracyk, "Will to Love" would have been included on a Crosby, Stills, Nash & Young album had the quartet been able to match the power of Young's solo recording.

== Lyrics and music ==
The singer of "Will to Love" imagines himself to be a salmon swimming upstream to mate and struggling to survive. He sings that "I'm a harpoon dodger/I can't, won't be tamed." Village Voice critic Robert Christgau says that Young "turns into a salmon while masturbating in front of the fireplace." Author Ken Bielen describes the theme of "Will to Love" as being the instinct to love and reproduce. Author David Downing describes the theme as being the hopelessness but necessity of the search for God and love.

Neil Young biographer Jimmy McDonough says that the "preposterous persona" of the salmon allows Young to "expound on the complex yearnings of love" and reveal "some naked truths about his cold wanderlust self." The salmon in the song determined to reach the spawning place has been interpreted as a metaphor for the desire and loneliness associated with the "will to love," or for Young's own desires and dreams. The fish with its will to love suggests that love is mysterious and spiritual with lines such as "It's like something from up above."

Neil Young FAQ author Glen Boyd describes "Will to Love" as having a "dreamy, atmospheric quality" which enhances the lyrics. He compares the "haunting" and "detached" sound of the song to such new-age music as that of Brian Eno and Tangerine Dream. McDonough points out that Young's vocal performance manages to encompass several contradictions simultaneously, such as being both worldly and "completely, terrifyingly alone," both reluctant and willing, and both empty but fulfilled.

At times the crackling from the fireplace can be heard in the song's background.

== Reception ==
"Will to Love" has drawn sharp disagreement among critics. For example, even among critics of one publication, Rolling Stone, critic Dave Marsh called "Will to Love" one "of the worst songs of Young's career." But later Rob Sheffield called it merely a "home-recording oddity." And in 2014, the editors of Rolling Stone ranked "Will to Love" #68 among all Neil Young's songs.

Young himself said of "Will to Love" that it "might be one of the best records I ever made." Young biographer Jimmy McDonough called it "one of Young's most otherworldly performances" and a "highlight" of American Stars 'N Bars. Author Ken Bielen calls it "a long, wordy track with an ethereal feel." Neil Young FAQ author Glen Boyd calls it one "of Young's all-time greatest songs," and one of his most beautiful and unique. Boyd also calls it "an absolutely masterful piece of songwriting" and states that Young only matches the "vivid lyrical imagery" of "Will to Love" in some of his American Indian songs such as "Pocahontas." Neil Young biographers Daniel Durchholz and Gary Graff call "Will to Love" "one of Young's most extraordinary works, if only for the way it was recorded."

Others who take a negative view of the song include music journalist Nigel Williamson, who disputed Young's assessment, calling the song "deeply unconvincing" and having a "laborious lyric." Author Sam Inglis calls it "a bizarrely awful seven-minute epic" developing "the whimsical image of [Young] as a leaping salmon." Music critic Johnny Rogan takes a somewhat more balanced view, calling the salmon metaphor "painfully extended" and concluding that "the convoluted imagery is both frustrating and fascinating as [Young] seriously overreaches himself."

== Personnel ==
- Neil Young – vocals, guitars, organ, piano, vibraphone, drums
