= Lotta Love =

1978 song written by Neil Young

- Side A of the US single

Single by Nicolette Larson

from the album Nicolette
- B-side: "Angels Rejoiced" (7") "You Send Me" (12")
- Released: October 1978
- Genre: Country rock; soft rock; pop rock
- Length: 3:11 (Single version); 4:14 (12" extended version)
- Label: Warner Bros.
- Songwriter: Neil Young
- Producer: Ted Templeman

Nicolette Larson singles chronology
"Lotta Love" (1978)	"Rhumba Girl" (1979)

Music video
- "Lotta Love" by Nicolette Larson on YouTube

"Lotta Love"

Song by Neil Young

from the album Comes a Time
- Released: 1978
- Recorded: January 10, 1976
- Studio: Wally Heider Recording Studios
- Genre: Country rock
- Length: 2:38
- Label: Reprise
- Songwriter: Neil Young
- Producers: Neil Young; David Briggs

Audio
- "Lotta Love" by Neil Young on YouTube

"Lotta Love" is a song written and recorded by Neil Young and released on his 1978 Comes a Time album. "Lotta Love" was also covered by Nicolette Larson in 1978. Larson's version reached No. 8 on the Billboard Hot 100 chart and No. 8 on the Cash Box Top 100 in February 1979. It also hit No. 1 on the Easy Listening chart and was a hit in Canada, (No. 4), Australia (No. 11) and New Zealand (No. 22).

== Background ==
Linda Ronstadt, who had sung back-up for Young with Larson, has stated that it was at her (i.e., Ronstadt's) suggestion that Larson record "Lotta Love" and that Larson's producer thanked Ronstadt by having a top-of-the-line sound system installed in her Mercedes convertible.

However, Larson's own recollection was that the suggestion she record "Lotta Love" originated with Neil Young, with whom she had formed a personal relationship while backing him vocally on American Stars 'n Bars. The publishers of Neil Young News quoted Larson as saying:

"I got that song off a tape I found lying on the floor of Neil's car. I popped it in the tape player and commented on what a great song it was. Neil said: 'You want it? It's yours.'"

== Versions ==
Neil Young and backing band Crazy Horse recorded "Lotta Love" in January 1976, but the song would not see release until 1978's Comes a Time. Larson provided background vocals for the album but did not sing on its "Lotta Love" track, a sparse version which emphasized the song's melancholy tone.

Larson's version of "Lotta Love"—which featured a string arrangement by Jimmie Haskell (whose credits include work with Bobbie Gentry and Rick Nelson), plus a classic soft rock horn riff and a flute solo—presented the song as optimistic. Larson would recall: "It was a very positive song and people don't want to hear how bad the world is all the time. It had a nice sound rhythm and groove. And a great visual video."

== Releases ==
=== Single ===
"Lotta Love" served as the lead single for Larson's Ted Templeman-produced Nicolette album. Due to a delay in release, Comes a Time and Nicolette were released on the same day, in October 1978. The release of a single from the Nicolette album was held off until October 31 when it was clear Young's version would not have a single release as an A-side (although Young's "Lotta Love" was released as the B-side of a non-charting "Comes a Time" single).

Record World said that Larson "steps out on a pop-rocker with a touch of disco" and called it a "strong debut."

=== Extended version ===
Much as extended dance versions of hits by the Doobie Brothers — who Templeman also produced — were released, a 12" single of Larson's "Lotta Love" was issued, with Jim Burgess performing remixing duties: this disco version differentiated from the album track and 7" single in its pure "four on the floor" disco drum track (replacing the radio version's "pop heartbeat" drum rhythm) and a sax solo on the bridge, replacing the 7" single's bridge flute solo which was shifted to an extended intro. The track did not heavily impact the club scene. Its meager length for a 12" single — at 4:20 barely a minute longer than the 7" — a likely deterrent. The B-side of the 7" single was "Angels Rejoiced" featuring a harmony vocal by Herb Pedersen while on its 12" single "Lotta Love" was backed by Larson's rendition of "You Send Me".

=== Live versions ===
Shortly after recording the song, Young and Crazy Horse performed the song live on their 1976 tour of Japan and Europe. A March 10 recording from Nippon Budokan is featured on the Odeon Budokan disc of 2020's Neil Young Archives Volume II: 1972–1976.

Young and the band would play the song again during 1978's Rust Never Sleeps tour. A performance from their October 15 show at St. Paul Civic Center appears on Live Rust, released the following year.

A live version of "Lotta Love" was included on the Live at the Roxy album consisting of Larson's December 20, 1978 concert at the Sunset Boulevard nightclub. The album was originally a limited issue (5000 copies) promo-only release. The first full release was on Rhino in 2006.

Larson also performed "Lotta Love" at the No Nukes concerts held at Madison Square Garden in September 1979. This version — with backing by the Doobie Brothers — was included on the No Nukes album. The performance was not included in the film version, although Larson herself appeared on-screen.

== Later versions ==
In February 1998, friends and associates of Nicolette Larson, who had died on December 16, 1997, performed a tribute at the Santa Monica Civic Auditorium which raised over $165,000 for the UCLA Children's Hospital. The two night engagement was billed as "The Lotta Love Concert" and opened with an ensemble performance of "Lotta Love" by Rosemary Butler, Valerie Carter, Carole King, and Bonnie Raitt. In December 2007, a "Lotta Love" memorial concert was held to mark the 10th anniversary of Larson's passing, and in December 2008, the Talking Stick in Venice, Los Angeles hosted a "Lotta Love" memorial concert which featured a performance of "Lotta Love" by Rosemary Butler and Andrew Gold.

Dinosaur Jr. covered the song for the album The Bridge: A Tribute to Neil Young, released in 1989.

Former Wet Wet Wet frontman Marti Pellow released a cover of the song in 2003, taken from his second solo album Between the Covers.

Red Hot Chili Peppers covered the song during the Bridge School Benefit concerts (organized by Neil Young) in October 2004.

In 2008, She & Him released a cover of "Lotta Love" on the B-side of their single "Why Do You Let Me Stay Here?".

In Feb 2025, Courtney Barnett released Lotta Love as a digital single from the tribute album Heart of Gold: The Songs of Neil Young. Due on April 25th, Heart of Gold will be the first release in a two-volume project, with proceeds benefiting The Bridge School. In addition to Courtney Barnett, the 14-song tracklist will feature fresh takes on Young's cherished catalog by Sharon Van Etten, The Lumineers, Stephen Marley, The Doobie Brothers, Allison Russell, Steve Earle, Rodney Crowell, and more.

== Charts ==
=== Weekly charts ===
Chart (1979)	Peak position
Australia (Kent Music Report)	11
Canada Adult Contemporary (RPM)	1
Canada Top Singles (RPM)	4
New Zealand (Recorded Music NZ)	22
US Billboard Hot 100	8
US Cash Box	8
US Billboard Easy Listening	1
US Record World	8

=== Year-end charts ===
Chart (1979)	Position
Australia (Kent Music Report)	84
Canada Top Singles (RPM)	46
US Billboard Hot 100	41
US Cash Box	63

== See also ==
- List of number-one adult contemporary singles of 1979 (U.S.)
