= Hawks & Doves =

Studio album by Neil Young
- Released: October 29, 1980
- Recorded: December 11, 1974 – July 5, 1980
- Studios: Village Recorders (Los Angeles); Quadrafonic (Nashville); Triiad (Fort Lauderdale); Indigo Ranch (Malibu); Gold Star (Hollywood)
- Genres: Country; folk
- Length: 29:47
- Labels: Reprise; Warner Bros.
- Producers: Neil Young; Tim Mulligan; Elliot Mazer

Neil Young chronology
Live Rust (1979)	Hawks & Doves (1980)	Re·ac·tor (1981)

Singles from Hawks & Doves
- 1. "Hawks & Doves" Released: September 1980; 2. "Stayin' Power" Released: January 1981

Hawks & Doves is the eleventh studio album by Canadian-American musician Neil Young. It was released on October 29, 1980, through Reprise Records. It was produced by Young along with Tim Mulligan and Elliot Mazer. The first side of the album consists of previously unreleased folk-centric material recorded from 1974 through 1977, while the second side features heavily country-styled songs recorded specifically for the album in July 1980.

Both contemporary and retrospective reception to Hawks & Doves has been mixed. The album's short length, disjointed styles and, in some places, seemingly patriotic lyrical content was met with confusion from fans and critics alike, especially after the critical and commercial success awarded to its predecessors, Rust Never Sleeps and Live Rust (both released in 1979).

Hawks & Doves was moderately successful, reaching the top 30 in the US. However, it only reached number 50 in Canada and its two singles, the title track and "Stayin' Power", failed to chart in either country. The album remained unavailable on CD until it was reissued in 2003 as part of the Neil Young Archives Digital Masterpiece Series.

== Background ==
In 1979, Young released the album Rust Never Sleeps to critical acclaim. The previous year, Young's second son Ben was born, who was unable to speak and required the use of a wheelchair due to severe cerebral palsy. In an effort to assist Ben, Neil and then-wife Pegi Young engaged in an intense program which Neil described as taking up "13, 14 hours a day, seven days a week". Due to this personal stress, it has been long understood that the scattershot nature of Hawks & Doves was a consequence of Neil's inability to give as much attention to a consistent recording schedule while also participating in the program. Shares Young's manager Elliot Roberts in the biography Shakey: "I wasn't allowed to tell people that Neil was involved in therapy with Ben 18 hours a day, and that's why he could not promote anything. I could never use that as an excuse, because it would become the story. One thing we didn't want was pity."

Hawks & Doves's two sides were recorded in different circumstances, side one being culled from sessions dating from 1974 to 1977, and side two from sessions set in early 1980 specifically for the album. It is also one of Young's shortest albums, with a running time of just under half an hour.

== Writing ==
Side one, the 'doves' side, includes "Little Wing" and "The Old Homestead", which were recorded during the sessions for 1975's Homegrown.

The allegorical lyrics of "The Old Homestead" reference Young's ambiguity about working with his band-mates CSNY.

"Lost in Space", like the earlier "After the Gold Rush", was inspired by another screenplay by actor Dean Stockwell. The song features studio effects to make it sound like Young is singing underwater. The song was recorded at Triiad studios in September 1977 for an early version of Comes a Time that Young dubbed Oceanside/Countryside.

"Captain Kennedy" recounts events from the life of Lou Kenedy, a Caribbean cargo trader who had his schooner Wawaloam destroyed by a German U-boat in August 1941. Young, along with fellow avid sailor Jimmy Buffett crossed paths with Kenedy in Nassau, Bahamas in the early 1970s and learned of his history there. "Captain Kennedy" was recorded the night of the Hitchhiker recording in August 1976.

Side two, dubbed the 'hawks' side, consists of the recordings intended for the album, being the straightest country and western songs Young had penned to date, even more so than those found on American Stars 'N Bars or Comes a Time. The songs' lyrics seem to reflect a new, harder-edged political perspective from an artist previously seen as a standard bearer for the hippie movement. The album's release within a week of Ronald Reagan's election reinforced this perception.

The song "Union Man" takes a swipe at the musician's union, and a perceived fecklessness of unions in general.

In "Comin' Apart at Every Nail", Young sings about America's economic backsliding.

The song "Hawks & Doves", which features choruses of 'USA!', was in part influenced by the Iran hostage crisis. "I just wish we didn't have to sit there and take it for so long. I was on the edge there." Young would tell Bill Flanagan in 1985.

== Release ==
It was unavailable on compact disc until it was released as a HDCD-encoded remastered version on August 19, 2003, as part of the Neil Young Archives Digital Masterpiece Series.

== Recording ==
Side two was recorded in a single week in July 1980 at Gold Star Studios, Hollywood. The sessions featured longtime collaborators Ben Keith and Rufus Thibodeaux as well as the rhythm section of Dennis Belfield and Greg Thomas, and backing vocalist Hillary O'Brien.

== Promotion ==
Young performed a single concert with the band from the recording sessions featured on side two. In October 1980, the group appeared at the Bread and Roses Festival of Acoustic Music held at the Greek Theatre in Berkeley. The concert featured the songs on side two of the album plus new songs "Winter Winds" and "Motor City". "Motor City" would later be recorded for 1981's Re·ac·tor.

== Critical reception ==
Professional ratings
Review scores
Source	Rating
AllMusic	3/5 stars
Christgau's Record Guide	A−
The Encyclopedia of Popular Music	3/5 stars
MusicHound Rock: The Essential Album Guide	3/5 stars
Pitchfork	5.7/10
The Rolling Stone Album Guide	3.5/5 stars
Spin Alternative Record Guide	5/10

Contemporary reviews for Hawks & Doves were positive. Robert Christgau was moderately positive towards side one, recommending "The Old Homestead" to "fanatics" and praising "Lost in Space" and "Captain Kennedy" as "fun and kinda haunting", while he deemed side two to be "quite brilliant", highlighting the material's brevity, hooks, and lack of the "slickness" of the country rock genre. Jon Young of Trouser Press deemed it to be a "throwaway album", but enjoyed the record, praising side two for being "plenty loose" without the "drunken harshness" of American Stars 'n' Bars (1977).

Hawks & Doves has retrospectively received mixed reviews from critics, both due to its scattershot nature and recording history and in comparison to Young's celebrated 1970s work. In a retrospective review for AllMusic, William Ruhlmann rated the album three stars out of five, deeming it a "slight" collection of "obscure acoustic and country-tinged" material. Jeff Giles of Ultimate Classic Rock found it "hard to shake the feeling that Hawks & Doves lacked the drive and focus that had so recently enlivened Young's music", though he also noted its more accessible nature in comparison to Young's experimental work throughout the rest of the decade. Giles also noted the "uncomfortable" reaction exhibited by fans in response to the anti-union and patriotic sentiments of "Union Man" and the title track, respectively. Rob Mitchum of Pitchfork noted the album's status as being "not much more" than the "dashed-off" successor to Rust Never Sleeps (1979), finding it "uncharacteristically tentative" and thematically confused.

== Track listing ==
All tracks are written by Neil Young.

Side one
No.	Title	Recorded	Length
1.	"Little Wing"	January 21, 1975	2:10
2.	"The Old Homestead"	December 11, 1974	7:38
3.	"Lost in Space"	September 15, 1977	4:13
4.	"Captain Kennedy"	August 11, 1976	2:50
Total length:			16:51

Side two
No.	Title	Recorded	Length
1.	"Stayin' Power"	July 3, 1980	2:17
2.	"Coastline"	July 2, 1980	2:24
3.	"Union Man"	July 5, 1980	2:08
4.	"Comin' Apart at Every Nail"	July 5, 1980	2:33
5.	"Hawks & Doves"	July 4, 1980	3:27
Total length:			12:49

== Personnel ==
"Little Wing"
Recorded at Village Recorders, Los Angeles, 1/21/1975 for Homegrown

- Neil Young – guitar, vocals, harmonica

"The Old Homestead"
Recorded at Quadrafonic Sound Studio, Nashville, 12/11/1974

- Neil Young – guitar, vocals
- Tim Drummond – bass
- Levon Helm – drums
- Tom Scribner – saw

"Lost in Space"
Recorded at Triiad Recording Studios, Ft. Lauderdale, 9/15/1977

- Neil Young – six and twelve-string guitar, vocals, vibes

"Captain Kennedy"
Recorded at Indigo Ranch Recording Studio, Malibu, 8/11/1976 for Hitchhiker

- Neil Young – guitar, vocals

"Stayin Power", "Coastline", "Union Man", "Comin' Apart at Every Nail", and "Hawks & Doves"
Recorded at Gold Star Recording Studio, Hollywood, 7/2–5/1980

- Neil Young – guitar, harmonica, piano, vocals
- Dennis Belfield – bass
- Greg Thomas – drums
- Rufus Thibodeaux – fiddle
- Ben Keith – steel guitar, Dobro, harmony vocals
- Hillary O'Brien – harmony vocals

Additional roles

- Stew Romaine – mastering
- Elliot Roberts – direction
- Tim Mulligan – mastering, production
- David Briggs – production

== Charts ==
Chart (1980)	Peak position
Australian Albums (Kent Music Report)	10
Canada Top Albums/CDs (RPM)	50
Dutch Albums (Album Top 100)	30
New Zealand Albums (RMNZ)	4
Norwegian Albums (VG-lista)	15
Swedish Albums (Sverigetopplistan)	22
UK Albums (Official Charts)	34
US Billboard 200	30
