= Pocahontas (song) =

1979 song by Neil Young and Crazy Horse

Song by Neil Young and Crazy Horse

from the album Rust Never Sleeps
- Released: July 2, 1979
- Recorded: August 11, 1976 (Hitchhiker); September 4, 1977 (Rust Never Sleeps)
- Studio: Indigo Ranch, Malibu (Hitchhiker); Triiad Studios, Fort Lauderdale (Rust Never Sleeps)
- Genre: Folk rock
- Length: 3:22
- Label: Reprise
- Songwriter: Neil Young
- Producers: Neil Young; David Briggs; Tim Mulligan

"Pocahontas" is a song written by Neil Young that was first released on his 1979 album Rust Never Sleeps. The song has also been covered by Johnny Cash, Everclear, Emily Loizeau, Crash Vegas, Gillian Welch, Trampled By Turtles, and Ian McNabb.

== History ==
Young originally recorded a version of "Pocahontas" in the mid-1970s for his planned but unreleased album Chrome Dreams, and an early recording of the song is included on Young's 2017 release Hitchhiker. The same recording, with additional overdubs, was released on Rust Never Sleeps.

Young may have been inspired to write the song after reading Hart Crane's 1930 poem The Bridge, which Young read in London in 1971. The seventeenth-century Indigenous heroine Matoaka (white name, Pocahontas) is a central character in The Bridge.

Commentators over the years have noted the song's similarity to Carole King's "He's a Bad Boy."

Young later explained that he wrote the song shortly after the 45th Academy Awards ceremony in which Marlon Brando refused his Oscar and had actress Sacheen Littlefeather, an activist for Native American civil rights, speak on his behalf, because he was protesting the portrayal of Native Americans in film; hence the references to Brando and the closing lyric "Marlon Brando, Pocahontas and me." At one point Young was planning to title the song "Marlon Brando, John Ehrlichman, Pocahontas and Me."

== Lyrics and music ==
Rolling Stone contributing editor Rob Sheffield finds "Pocahontas" to be "an agonizingly lonely ballad". The themes of "Pocahontas" include passage of time, travel through space and companionship. Rolling Stone critic Paul Nelson claims that "Young sails through time and space like he owns them." The lyrics of "Pocahontas" primarily describe the massacre of an indigenous tribe by European colonizers. However, by the end of the song the lyrics have jumped to modern times, with a fictional meeting in the Astrodome between the narrator, Pocahontas (actual name, Matoaka) and indigenous rights activist actor Marlon Brando. Rolling Stone author Andy Greene describes the song as a "surreal journey through time from the 17th century" to modern times.

"Pocahontas" begins with an image that evokes "a cold breeze whistling by":

Aurora borealis
The icy sky at night
Paddles cut the water
In a long and hurried flight

It then describes the massacre. According to music critic Johnny Rogan, Young describes the tragedy with restraint. The narrator appears to be in the middle of the situation with the word "us" in the lines "They killed us in our teepee", but then undercuts that appearance with the lines "They might have left some babies/Cryin' on the ground." Rogan discusses the disorientating effect of these lines. While the tragedy is described in the first person, the word "might" also creates a more disinterested tone. The listener is also unsure whether to be relieved that the soldiers might have shown some small degree of mercy to these babies, or whether to feel even greater anger that the defenseless babies were left to probably die slowly out in the open. According to Rogan, Young's "casual" delivery adds to the horror even more.

The time period fast forwards, moving from the settlers massacring the buffalo to a bank on the corner in a single line, and then to the present day where the narrator sits in his room with an indigenous rug and a "pipe to share". The following verse then provides a flashback, which Nelson calls "so loony and moving that you don't know whether to laugh or cry", and challenges the listener to try to reduce that verse to a single emotion:

I wish I was a trapper
I would give a thousand pelts
To sleep with Pocahontas
And find out how she felt
In the mornin' on the fields of green
In the homeland we've never seen.

Nelson and others have commented on the effect of the "bawdy pun" on sleeping with Matoaka to "find out how she felt". Finally, in what critic Jim Sullivan calls "a biting surrealistic twist", in the last verse the narrator sits with Matoaka and Marlon Brando, discussing Hollywood, the Astrodome and the first teepee. These last two items summarize the song by creating a stark contrast between a contemporary, enormous American structure with a relatively modest and ancient Indigenous structure.

In 1973, Marlon Brando chose not to accept his Oscar award for Best Actor for his role in The Godfather. He refused to take the stage in protest of Hollywood's often derogatory and racist portrayal of Native Americans in film. Instead, he sent Native American actress Sacheen Littlefeather to attend the ceremony in his place. On stage, she read a statement by Brando condemning the entertainment industry for their mockery of Native Americans.

Young accompanies himself on acoustic guitar. AllMusic critic Matthew Greenwald describes the song as having a "strong folk/country melody. According to Greene, the melody borrows from Carole King's 1963 song "He's a Bad Boy."

== Critical reception ==
Rolling Stone critic Nelson describes "Pocahontas" as being "simply amazing, and nobody but Neil Young could have written it." Music critic Johnny Rogan called the song "one of Young's most accomplished acoustic tracks from the period and a perfect example of his ability to mix pathos and comedy." Author Ken Bielen calls it "a classic piece of music in Young's body of work. Bob Bonn of the Beaver County Times compared it unfavorably to Young's earlier song about European conquest of the Indians, "Cortez the Killer", in that the lyrics do not match the "brilliant, melancholy and haunting" quality of the earlier song, nor is Young's guitar playing as evocative. But music critic Robert Christgau counters that due to the "offhand complexity of the lyrics...'Pocahantas' makes 'Cortez the Killer' seem like a tract." Critic Dave Marsh claimed that Young "found an amusing new way to tackle his romanticized fantasies of the Indians." Jim Sullivan of Bangor Daily News calls "Pocahontas" "the most intriguing song" of Rust Never Sleeps. A readers' poll conducted by Rolling Stone named "Pocahontas" to be Young's 6th greatest "deep cut."

== Personnel ==
- Neil Young – guitar, vocals (lead and backing)

== Other appearances ==
Live versions of "Pocahontas" were included on Young's 1993 album Unplugged and 1997 album Year of the Horse. Everclear covered the song on their 2008 album The Vegas Years. Emily Loizeau covered the song on her 2005 album L' Autre Bout Du Monde. Gillian Welch covered the song on The Revelator Collection.

Johnny Cash, backed by Tom Petty and the Heartbreakers, covered "Pocahontas" on his 2003 posthumous album Unearthed. AllMusic critic Thom Jurek called Cash's version "visionary" and a "sage read". Entertainment Weekly critic David Browne described it as a "quasi-psychedelic" take on Young's already surreal song.

Canadian folk-rock group Crash Vegas contributed a cover to Borrowed Tunes, a tribute to Neil Young.

== See also ==
- List of anti-war songs
