= Hitchhiker (album) =

Studio album by Neil Young
- Released: September 8, 2017
- Recorded: August 11, 1976
- Studios: Indigo Ranch Recording Studio, Malibu, California
- Genre: Rock
- Length: 33:44
- Label: Reprise
- Producers: Neil Young; David Briggs; John Hanlon

Neil Young chronology
Peace Trail (2016)	Hitchhiker (2017)	The Visitor (2017)

Singles from Hitchhiker
- 1. "Hitchhiker" Released: August 4, 2017

Hitchhiker is the thirty-ninth studio album by Canadian / American singer-songwriter Neil Young, issued September 8, 2017, on Reprise Records. It is the ninth release in Young's ongoing archival release series and the first of the Special Release series.

Co-produced by Young and David Briggs with post-production from John Hanlon, the album was originally recorded on August 11, 1976, at Indigo Ranch Recording Studio in Malibu, California. Young intended to release the album shortly after it was recorded, but executives at Reprise felt that it "wasn't a real record, but a collection of demos", with the musician saying that he "was advised to record the songs with a band".

Eight of the ten songs found on Hitchhiker were released on various Neil Young studio albums over the next three decades, though mostly as versions from different live or studio recordings. Three songs from the session ("Captain Kennedy", "Pocahontas" and "Campaigner") were released in nearly the same form as they are found on Hitchhiker. Two of the songs ("Hawaii" and "Give Me Strength") were previously unreleased in any form prior to this album.

== Background and recording ==
Between 1975 and 1977, Young and producer David Briggs periodically conducted recording sessions at Indigo Ranch on nights of the full moon. These sessions took place during a particularly productive period for Young and yielded such songs as "Will to Love" and "Stringman". Briggs said of the time, "He'd turn to me and go, 'Guess I'll turn on the tap'—and then out came 'Powderfinger,' 'Pocahontas,' 'Out of the Blue,' 'Ride My Llama.' Two days, a day. I'm not talkin' about sittin' down with a pen and paper, I'm talkin' about pickin' up a guitar, sittin' there and lookin' me in the face and in twenty minutes—'Pocahontas.'"

The songs on the album were recorded in a single night. In his memoir Special Deluxe, Young described the session, "It was a complete piece, although I was pretty stony on it, and you can hear it in my performances... I laid down all the songs in a row, pausing only for weed, beer, or coke. Briggs was in the control room, mixing live on his favorite console." Many of the songs would appear on future Young albums: "Pocahontas" is the same take used on Rust Never Sleeps sans overdubs; "Captain Kennedy" remains virtually unchanged from Hawks & Doves; "Campaigner" is presented in its unedited length with an additional verse as it appeared on the test pressings and the first German pressing of Decade but is otherwise unchanged; whereas the others appeared on American Stars 'n Bars, Comes a Time, Rust Never Sleeps, and Le Noise, albeit from different sessions and performances. Hitchhiker also contains a pair of never-before-released songs: "Hawaii" and "Give Me Strength;" the latter has occasionally been performed live.

In an interview with KOTO FM (which was also posted to his public Facebook page), Young stated that the session was intended to be released as an album not long after it was recorded, but Reprise executives were unimpressed. The material was considered to be no more than a collection of demos not fit for release, and the label suggested that Young rerecord the songs with a backing band.

== Critical reception ==
Professional ratings
Aggregate scores
Source	Rating
AnyDecentMusic?	8.1/10
Metacritic	85/100
Review scores
Source	Rating
AllMusic	4/5 stars
The A.V. Club	B+
Classic Rock	4.5/5 stars
Consequence	B+
Exclaim!	8/10
The Independent	4/5 stars
Paste	9.1/10
Pitchfork	8.4/10
Rolling Stone	4.5/5 stars
Uncut	9/10

Hitchhiker received universal acclaim from contemporary music critics. On the review aggregator Metacritic, the album received an average score of 85 out of 100, based on 21 reviews.

In a four-out-of-five star review for AllMusic, editor Stephen Thomas Erlewine stated "On Hitchhiker, Young still isn't certain if he's exorcized those demons, and that unease gives just enough complexity to the album's soothing ebb and flow." Writing for The A.V. Club, Josh Modell gave the album a B+ rating and called it a "fantastic" artifact of Young's fruitful 1970s songwriting period. Additionally, Modell praised the "naked and intimate" sound of "Pocahontas" and "Powderfinger" and concluded, "If the bottom of the barrel sounds this good, [Young] should keep 'em coming."

Pitchfork contributor Sam Sodomsky also praised the album, giving it an 8.4/10 score. Sodomsky wrote, "Young was on the verge of an epiphany in the summer of '76: his past, present, and future cohabitating in a body of work with the potential to get torn up and rewritten with any sudden vision, any chemical impulse. Beautiful, strange, and stoned, Hitchhiker lets us in on one of those nights."

== Track listing ==
No.	Title	Original release	Length
1.	"Pocahontas"	Rust Never Sleeps (1979), with overdubs	3:27
2.	"Powderfinger"	Rust Never Sleeps (1979), recorded live with Crazy Horse	3:22
3.	"Captain Kennedy"	Hawks & Doves (1980)	2:51
4.	"Hawaii"	previously unreleased	2:38
5.	"Give Me Strength"	previously unreleased	3:40
6.	"Ride My Llama"	Rust Never Sleeps (1979), in a solo live performance	1:50
7.	"Hitchhiker"	Le Noise (2010), recorded with electric guitar. Some lyrics and part of tune used for "Like an Inca" from Trans (1983)	4:37
8.	"Campaigner"	Decade (1977), edited to remove a verse	4:19
9.	"Human Highway"	Comes a Time (1978), recorded with band	3:16
10.	"The Old Country Waltz"	American Stars 'n Bars (1977), recorded with Crazy Horse and The Bullets	3:37

== Personnel ==
- Neil Young – guitar, harmonica, vocals

Additional roles

- David Briggs – producer, mixing
- Richard Kaplan – engineering
- John Hanlon – post production
- Chris Bellman – mastering

== Charts ==
=== Weekly charts ===
Chart (2017)	Peak position
Australian Albums (ARIA)	22
Austrian Albums (Ö3 Austria)	9
Belgian Albums (Ultratop Flanders)	9
Belgian Albums (Ultratop Wallonia)	13
Canadian Albums (Billboard)	23
Danish Albums (Hitlisten)	26
Dutch Albums (Album Top 100)	14
Finnish Albums (Suomen virallinen lista)	6
French Albums (SNEP)	27
German Albums (Offizielle Top 100)	8
Irish Albums (IRMA)	7
Italian Albums (FIMI)	31
New Zealand Albums (RMNZ)	18
Norwegian Albums (VG-lista)	10
Portuguese Albums (AFP)	36
Scottish Albums (Official Charts)	2
Spanish Albums (Promusicae)	15
Swedish Albums (Sverigetopplistan)	7
Swiss Albums (Schweizer Hitparade)	13
UK Albums (Official Charts)	6
US Billboard 200	20
US Americana/Folk Albums (Billboard)	3
US Top Rock Albums (Billboard)	5
US Indie Store Album Sales (Billboard)	3

=== Year-end charts ===
Chart (2017)	Position
Belgian Albums (Ultratop Flanders)	192
