= Decade (Neil Young album) =

Compilation album by Neil Young
- Released: October 28, 1977
- Recorded: 1966 – 1976
- Studio: Various
- Genres: Country rock; folk rock
- Length: 144:22
- Label: Warner Bros.
- Producers: Neil Young; Elliot Mazer; Tim Mulligan; David Briggs; Jack Nitzsche; Ahmet Ertegun; Charles Greene; Brian Stone; Ry Cooder; Henry Lewy; L.A. Johnson; Kendall Pacios; Stephen Stills; Don Gehman

Neil Young chronology
| American Stars 'n Bars (1977) | Decade (1977) | Comes a Time (1978) |

Singles from Decade
- 1. "Sugar Mountain" / "The Needle and the Damage Done" Released: 1977

Decade is a compilation album by Canadian–American musician Neil Young, originally released in 1977 as a triple album and later issued on two compact discs. It contains 35 of Young's songs recorded between 1966 and 1976, among them five tracks that had been unreleased up to that point. It peaked at No. 43 on the Billboard Top Pop Albums chart, and was certified platinum by the RIAA in 1986.

== History ==
Compiled by Young himself, with his hand-written liner notes about each track, Decade represents almost every album from his career and various affiliations through 1977 with the exception of 4 Way Street and Time Fades Away. Of the previously unreleased songs, "Down to the Wire" features the New Orleans pianist Dr. John with Buffalo Springfield on an item from their shelved Stampede album; "Love Is a Rose" had been a minor hit for Linda Ronstadt in 1975; "Winterlong" received a cover by Pixies on the Neil Young tribute album from 1989, The Bridge; and "Campaigner" is a Young song critical of Richard Nixon. The track "Long May You Run" is a different mix to that found on the album of the same name, featuring the harmonies of the full Crosby Stills & Nash before David Crosby and Graham Nash left the recording sessions.

For many years, Decade was the only Neil Young compilation album available. A 1993 compilation called Lucky Thirteen was released, but it only covered Young's 1982–1988 output. It was not until 2004 that Reprise Records released a single-disc retrospective of his best-known tracks, titled Greatest Hits. Throughout the 1980s and '90s, Young promised fans a follow-up to the original Decade collection, provisionally titled Decade II; eventually, this idea was scrapped in favor of a much more comprehensive anthology to be titled Archives, spanning his entire career and ranging in size from a box set to an entire series of audio and/or video releases. The first release of archival material since Decade and Lucky Thirteen would appear in 2006, Live at the Fillmore East, a recording from a 1970 concert featuring Crazy Horse with Danny Whitten. Several other archival live releases followed, and in 2009 the first of several planned multi-disc box sets, The Archives Vol. 1 1963–1972, was issued. In April 2017 Decade was reissued on vinyl as a limited-edition Record Store Day release, with remastered vinyl and CD editions planned for general release in June 2017.

== Alternate early version ==
Initially, Decade was to be released in 1976, but was pulled at the last minute by Young. It was shelved until the following year, where it appeared with two songs removed from the original track list (a live version of "Don't Cry No Tears" recorded in Japan in 1976, and a live version of "Pushed It Over the End" recorded in 1974). Also removed were the following comments on those two songs and Time Fades Away, from Young's handwritten liner notes:

Time Fades Away. No songs from this album are included here. It was recorded on my biggest tour ever, 65 shows in 90 days. Money hassles among everyone concerned ruined this tour and record for me but I released it anyway so you folks could see what could happen if you lose it for a while. I was becoming more interested in an audio verité approach than satisfying the public demands for a repetition of Harvest.

Don't Cry No Tears. Initially titled 'I Wonder,' this song was written in 1964. One of my first songs. This is a live recording from Japan with Crazy Horse.

Pushed It over the End. Recorded live on the road in Chicago, 1974. Thanks to Crosby & Nash's help on the overdubbed chorus, I was able to complete this work. I wrote it for Patty Hearst and her countless brothers and sisters. Also, I wrote it for myself and the increasing distance between me and you.

== Reception ==
Professional ratings
Review scores
| Source | Rating |
|---|---|
| AllMusic | 5/5 stars |
| Christgau's Record Guide | A |
| Encyclopedia of Popular Music | 5/5 stars |

The album has been lauded in many quarters as one of the best examples of a career retrospective for a rock artist, and as a template for the box set collections that would follow in the 1980s and beyond. However, in the original article on Young from the first edition of the Rolling Stone Illustrated History of Rock and Roll and a subsequent article in the 1983 Rolling Stone Record Guide, critic Dave Marsh used this album to accuse Young of deliberately manufacturing a self-mythology, arguing that while his highlights could be seen to place him on a level with other artists from his generation like Bob Dylan or The Beatles, the particulars of his catalogue did not bear this out. The magazine has since excised the article from subsequent editions of the Illustrated History book.

== Track listing ==
All songs written by Neil Young.

=== Side one ===
1. "Down to the Wire" – 2:25
  - Previously unreleased (1967); performed with Buffalo Springfield members Stephen Stills and Richie Furay along with Dr. John; planned for inclusion on the unreleased album Stampede
  - Neil Young – guitar, vocal; Stephen Stills – guitar, vocal; Richie Furay – vocal; Mac Rebennack – piano; Bobby West – bass; Jesse Hill – drums, timpani
  - Recorded at Gold Star Studios & Columbia Recording Studio, Hollywood, 3/28/1967, 3/30-4/18/1967.
2. "Burned" – 2:14
  - Performed by Buffalo Springfield; appears on the album Buffalo Springfield (1966)
  - Neil Young – guitar, piano, vocal; Stephen Stills – guitar, vocal; Richie Furay – guitar, vocal; Bruce Palmer – bass; Dewey Martin – drums
  - Recorded at Gold Star Recording Studios, Hollywood, 8/15/1966.
3. "Mr. Soul" – 2:41
  - Performed by Buffalo Springfield; recorded live in the studio in New York City, with guitar overdubs added subsequently; appears on the album Buffalo Springfield Again (1967)
  - Neil Young – guitar, vocal; Stephen Stills – guitar, vocal; Richie Furay – guitar, vocal; Bruce Palmer – bass; Dewey Martin – drums
  - Recorded at Atlantic Studios, New York City, 1/9/1967.
4. "Broken Arrow" – 6:13
  - Performed by Buffalo Springfield; appears on the album Buffalo Springfield Again
  - Neil Young – guitar, vocal; Richie Furay – guitar, vocal; Stephen Stills – guitar; Chris Sarns – guitar; Don Randi – piano, organ; Bruce Palmer – bass; Dewey Martin – Drums, vocal; Also – strings. Jazz theme: Don Randi – piano; Jim Horn – clarinet; Hal Blaine – drums; Also – bass
  - Recorded at Columbia Recording Studio & Sunset Sound, Hollywood, 8/25/1967, 9/5-18/1967.
5. "Expecting to Fly" – 3:44
  - Appears on the album Buffalo Springfield Again but no band member other than Neil Young appears on the track.
  - Neil Young – guitar, vocal; Jack Nitzsche – electric piano; Don Randi – piano, harpsichord; Russ Titelman – guitar; Carol Kaye – bass; Jim Gordon – drums; Choir – Merry Clayton, Brenda Holloway, Patrice Holloway, Gloria Jones, Sherlie Matthews, Gracia Nitzsche; Also – English horn, vibes, timpani, strings
  - Recorded at Sunset Sound, Hollywood, 5/6/1967.
6. "Sugar Mountain" – 5:43
  - Released as the B-side to "The Loner", February 21, 1969
  - Neil Young – guitar, vocal
  - Recorded live in concert at the Canterbury House, Ann Arbor, Michigan, 11/10/1968.

=== Side two ===
1. "I Am a Child" – 2:17
  - Appears on the Buffalo Springfield album Last Time Around (1968) but features no members of the band other than Neil Young and drummer Dewey Martin
  - Neil Young – guitar, harmonica, vocal; Gary Marker – bass; Dewey Martin – drums
  - Recorded at Sunset Sound, Hollywood, 2/5/1968.
2. "The Loner" – 3:50
  - Appears on the album Neil Young (1968)
  - Neil Young – guitar, pipe organ, vocal; Jim Messina – bass; George Grantham – drums; Also – strings and celli
  - Recorded at TTG Recording Studios, Los Angeles, 9/28/1968.
3. "The Old Laughing Lady" – 5:59/5:35**
  - Appears on the album Neil Young (** – Edited version on 1988 CD reissue)
  - Neil Young – vocal; Ry Cooder – guitar; Jack Nitzsche – electric piano; Carol Kaye – bass; Earl Palmer – drums; Choir: Merry Clayton, Brenda Holloway, Patrice Holloway, Gloria Jones, Sherlie Matthews, and Gracia Nitzsche; Also – trumpet, trombone, tenor sax, French horn, clarinet, strings and timpani
  - Recorded at Sunwest Recording Studios, Hollywood, 10/17/1968.
4. "Cinnamon Girl" – 2:59
  - Performed by Neil Young & Crazy Horse; appears on the album Everybody Knows This Is Nowhere (1969)
  - Neil Young – guitar, vocal; Danny Whitten – guitar, vocal; Billy Talbot – bass; Ralph Molina – drums, vocal
  - Recorded at Wally Heider Recording Studios, Hollywood, 3/20/1969.
5. "Down by the River" – 9:16/9:00**
  - Performed by Neil Young & Crazy Horse; appears on the album Everybody Knows This Is Nowhere
  - Neil Young – guitar, vocal; Danny Whitten – guitar, vocal; Billy Talbot – bass; Ralph Molina – drums, vocal
  - Recorded at Wally Heider Recording Studios, Hollywood, 1/17/1969.

=== Side three ===
1. "Cowgirl in the Sand" – 10:01
  - Performed by Neil Young & Crazy Horse; appears on the album Everybody Knows This Is Nowhere
  - Neil Young – guitar, vocal; Danny Whitten – guitar, vocal; Billy Talbot – bass; Ralph Molina – drums, vocal
  - Recorded at Wally Heider Recording Studios, Hollywood, 1/18/1969.
2. "I Believe in You" – 3:27
  - Performed by Neil Young & Crazy Horse; appears on the album After the Gold Rush (1970)
  - Neil Young – guitar, piano, vibes, vocal; Danny Whitten – guitar, vocal; Billy Talbot – bass; Ralph Molina – drums, vocal
  - Recorded at Sunset Sound, Hollywood, 8/5/1969.
3. "After the Gold Rush" – 3:45
  - Appears on the album After the Gold Rush
  - Neil Young – piano, vocal; Bill Peterson – flugelhorn
  - Recorded at Home Studio, Topanga, CA, 3/12/1970.
4. "Southern Man" – 5:31
  - Appears on the album After the Gold Rush
  - Neil Young – guitar, vocal; Nils Lofgren – piano, vocal; Greg Reeves – bass; Ralph Molina – drums, vocal; Danny Whitten – vocal
  - Recorded at Home Studio, Topanga, CA, 3/19/1970.
5. "Helpless" – 3:34
  - Performed by Crosby, Stills, Nash & Young; appears on the album Déjà Vu (1970)
  - Neil Young – acoustic guitar, vocal; Stephen Stills – lead guitar, piano, vocal; David Crosby – vocal; Graham Nash – guitar, vocal; Greg Reeves – bass; Dallas Taylor – drums
  - Recorded at Wally Heider Studios, San Francisco, 11/7/1969.

=== Side four ===
1. "Ohio" – 2:56
  - Performed by Crosby, Stills, Nash & Young; released as a non-album single in June, 1970 and later appeared on So Far, 1974
  - Neil Young – guitar, vocal; Stephen Stills – guitar, vocal; David Crosby – guitar, vocal; Graham Nash – vocal; Calvin "Fuzzy" Samuels – bass; Johnny Barbata – drums
  - Recorded at The Record Plant, Hollywood, 5/21/1970.
2. "Soldier" – 2:28
  - Edited version originally from the album Journey Through the Past (1972)
  - Neil Young – piano, vocal
  - Recorded at Sawdust Burner, Kings Mountain, CA, 11/15/1971.
3. "Old Man" – 3:21
  - Appears on the album Harvest (1972)
  - Neil Young – guitar, vocal; Ben Keith – pedal steel guitar; James McMahon – piano; Tim Drummond – bass; Kenny Buttrey – drums; Linda Ronstadt – vocal; James Taylor – banjo, vocal
  - Recorded at Quadrafonic Sound Studios, Nashville, 2/6/1971.
4. "A Man Needs a Maid" – 3:58
  - Appears on the album Harvest
  - Neil Young – piano, vocal; with the London Symphony Orchestra
  - Recorded at Barking Town Hall, London, 3/1/1971.
5. "Harvest" – 3:08
  - Appears on the album Harvest
  - Neil Young – guitar, vocal; Ben Keith – pedal steel guitar; John Harris – piano; Tim Drummond – bass; Kenny Buttrey – drums
  - Recorded at Quadrafonic Sound Studios, Nashville, 4/4/1971.
6. "Heart of Gold" – 3:06
  - Appears on the album Harvest
  - Neil Young – guitar, harmonica, vocal; Teddy Irwin – guitar; Ben Keith – pedal steel guitar; Tim Drummond – bass; Kenny Buttrey – drums; Linda Ronstadt – vocal; James Taylor – vocal
  - Recorded at Quadrafonic Sound Studios, Nashville, 2/8/1971.
7. "Star of Bethlehem" – 2:46
  - Appears on the album American Stars 'n Bars (1977); originally recorded in November 1974
  - Neil Young – guitar, vocal, harmonica; Ben Keith – dobro, vocal; Tim Drummond – bass; Karl T. Himmel – drums; Emmylou Harris – vocal
  - Recorded at Quadrafonic Sound Studios, Nashville, 12/13/1974.

=== Side five ===
1. "The Needle and the Damage Done" – 2:02
  - Appears on the album Harvest
  - Neil Young – guitar, vocal
  - Recorded live in concert at the Royce Hall, University of California, Westwood, Los Angeles, 1/30/1971.
2. "Tonight's the Night" (Part 1) – 4:41
  - Appears on the album Tonight's the Night (1975); originally recorded in 1973
  - Neil Young – piano, vocal; Nils Lofgren – guitar; Ben Keith – pedal steel guitar, vocal; Billy Talbot – bass; Ralph Molina – drums, vocal
  - Recorded at S.I.R., Hollywood, 8/26/1973.
3. "Tired Eyes" – 4:33
  - Appears on the album Tonight's the Night
  - Neil Young – guitar, harmonica, vocal; Nils Lofgren – piano, vocal; Ben Keith – pedal steel guitar, vocal; Billy Talbot – bass, vocal; Ralph Molina – drums, vocal
  - Recorded at S.I.R., Hollywood, 8/26/1973.
4. "Walk On" – 2:40
  - Appears on the album On the Beach (1974)
  - Neil Young – guitar, vocal; Ben Keith – slide guitar, vocal; Billy Talbot – bass; Ralph Molina – drums, vocal
  - Recorded at Studio, Broken Arrow Ranch, 11/30/1973.
5. "For the Turnstiles" – 3:01
  - Appears on the album On the Beach
  - Neil Young – banjo guitar, vocal; Ben Keith – dobro, vocal
  - Recorded at Studio, Broken Arrow Ranch, 12/14/1973.
6. "Winterlong" – 3:05
  - Previously unreleased; appeared on certain acetate pressings of Tonight's the Night
  - Neil Young – guitar, vocal; Ben Keith – pedal steel guitar, vocal; Billy Talbot – bass; Ralph Molina – drums, vocal
  - Recorded at Studio, Broken Arrow Ranch, 11/28/1973.
7. "Deep Forbidden Lake" – 3:39
  - Previously unreleased
  - Neil Young – guitar, vocal; Ben Keith – pedal steel guitar; Tim Drummond – bass; Karl T. Himmel – drums
  - Recorded at Quadrafonic Sound Studios, Nashville, 12/13/1974.

=== Side six ===
1. "Like a Hurricane" – 8:16
  - Performed by Neil Young & Crazy Horse; previously unreleased; different lead vocal dub from version on American Stars 'n Bars (Regular version on 1988 reissue CD)
  - Neil Young – guitar, vocal; Frank "Poncho" Sampedro – Stringman, vocals; Billy Talbot – bass; Ralph Molina – drums, vocal
  - Recorded at Studio, Broken Arrow Ranch, 11/29/1975.
2. "Love Is a Rose" – 2:16
  - Previously unreleased; later released on Homegrown (2020)
  - Neil Young – guitar, vocal, harmonica; Tim Drummond – bass
  - Recorded at Studio, Broken Arrow Ranch, Woodside, CA, 6/16/1974.
3. "Cortez the Killer" – 7:29
  - Performed by Neil Young & Crazy Horse; appears on the album Zuma (1975)
  - Neil Young – guitar, vocal; Frank "Poncho" Sampedro – guitar; Billy Talbot – bass, vocal; Ralph Molina – drums, vocal
  - Recorded at House, Point Dume, CA, 5/22/1975.
4. "Campaigner" – 3:30 / 4:19 [US LP test pressings and first LP pressings in Germany included an unedited 4:19 version with an extra verse]
  - Previously unreleased; unedited version later released on Hitchhiker (2017)
  - Neil Young – guitar, vocal
  - Recorded at Indigo Ranch Recording Studio, Malibu, 8/11/1976.
5. "Long May You Run" – 3:48
  - Performed by Crosby, Stills, Nash & Young; previously unreleased; original mix (without Crosby and Nash's vocals) appears on the Stills-Young Band album Long May You Run (1976)
  - Neil Young – guitar, harmonica, vocal; Stephen Stills – guitar, vocal; Joe Lala – percussion, vocal; Joe Vitale – drums, vocal; George "Chocolate" Perry – bass, vocal; Jerry Aiello – organ; David Crosby – vocal; Graham Nash – vocal
  - Recorded at Criteria Studios, Miami, 2/5/1976.

== Personnel ==
- Neil Young – guitar, harmonica, piano, vibes, banjo, pipe organ, vocals
- Billy Talbot – bass, vocals
- Bobby West, Bruce Palmer, Calvin "Fuzzy" Samuels, Carol Kaye, Donald "Duck" Dunn, Gary Marker, George "Chocolate" Perry, Greg Reeves, Jim Fielder, Jim Messina, Tim Drummond – bass
- Jim Horn – clarinet
- Dallas Taylor, Dewey Martin, Earl Palmer, George Grantham, Hal Blaine, Jim Keltner, Joe Vitale, John Barbata, Karl T. Himmel, Kenny Buttrey – drums
- Ralph Molina – drums, vocals
- Jesse Hill – drums, timpani
- Jack Nitzsche – electric piano
- Bill Peterson – flugelhorn
- Chris Sarns, Ry Cooder, Teddy Irwin – guitar
- Danny Whitten – guitar, vocals
- Jerry Aiello – organ
- Joe Lala – percussion
- James McMahon, John Harris, Mac Rebennack, Spooner Oldham – piano
- Nils Lofgren – piano, guitar, vocals
- Ben Keith – slide/pedal steel guitars, Dobro, vocals
- James Taylor – banjo-guitar, vocals
- David Crosby, Graham Nash, Richie Furay – guitar, vocals
- Stephen Stills – guitar, piano, vocals
- Merry Clayton, Brenda Holloway, Patrice Holloway, Gloria Richetta Jones, Sherlie Matthews, Gracia Nitzsche, Linda Ronstadt, Emmylou Harris – vocals
- London Symphony Orchestra

Additional roles

- Neil Young, Elliot Mazer, Tim Mulligan, David Briggs, Jack Nitzsche, Ahmet Ertegun, Charles Greene, Brian Stone, Ry Cooder, Henry Lewy, L.A. Johnson, Kendall Pacios, Stephen Stills, Don Gehman – production
- Joel Bernstein, Gary Burden, Henry Diltz – photography
- Tom Wilkes – photography, cover layout
- Tommy Grekel – album packaging

== Charts ==
Chart performance for Decade
| Chart (1977) | Peak position |
|---|---|
| Australia (Kent Music Report) | 21 |
| US Billboard Top LPs & Tape | 43 |
| UK Album Charts | 46 |
| Canadian RPM 100 Albums | 47 |
| Norwegian VG-lista Albums | 28 |
| New Zealand Album Charts | 34 |
| US Cash Box Top 100 Albums | 46 |
| US Record World Album Chart | 71 |

== Certifications ==
| Region | Certification | Certified units/sales |
|---|---|---|
| Australia (ARIA) | Platinum | 70,000^{^} |
| United Kingdom (BPI) | Platinum | 300,000^{^} |
| United States (RIAA) | Platinum | 1,000,000^{^} |
^{^} Shipments figures based on certification alone.
