= Like a Hurricane (song) =

- Cover to German single release, backed by "The Old Country Waltz"

Single by Neil Young and Crazy Horse

from the album American Stars 'n Bars
- B-side: "Hold Back the Tears"
- Released: August 8, 1977
- Recorded: November 29, 1975
- Studio: Broken Arrow Ranch, Woodside, California
- Genre: Rock
- Length: 8:20 (Album version); 5:24 (Single edit)
- Label: Reprise
- Songwriter(s): Neil Young
- Producer(s): Neil Young; David Briggs; Tim Mulligan

Neil Young singles chronology
"Hey Babe" (1977)	"Like a Hurricane" (1977)	"Sugar Mountain" (1977)

"Like a Hurricane" is a song written by Neil Young in 1975 and first released on the album American Stars 'n Bars in 1977.

== History ==
Young wrote the song in July 1975 at a time when he was unable to sing because of an operation on his vocal cords. It was premiered live in March 1976 at a UK concert with Crazy Horse.

Working in the White House studio at Young's Broken Arrow Ranch, the band initially tried to record the song with two guitars and no keyboard, but hearing Sampedro improvise a version on a synthesiser, Young picked up his guitar and played along. The released version starts abruptly as the tape was only started once the studio engineer realised what was happening. Young recalled:

All it is is four notes on the bass. Billy [Talbot] plays a few extra notes now and then, and the drumbeat’s the same all the way through… Sometimes it does sound as if we’re really playing fast, but we’re not. It’s just everything starts swimming around in circles.

The vocals were added subsequently, in the Village studio in LA, once Young's voice had recovered from surgery.

An edited version of "Like a Hurricane" was released as a single on August 8, 1977, with "Hold Back the Tears" as B-side. Driven by Young's trademark fierce guitar, the song became a landmark of the 'electric side' of his concerts and one of the most famous of Young's songs. The song has been played on nearly every tour Young has done since its release. It has also appeared on the compilations Decade and Greatest Hits and on the live albums Live Rust, Weld, Unplugged (this rendition is played almost entirely on a pump organ) and Way Down in the Rust Bucket; also released on Chrome Dreams in 2023.

== Composition ==
In a 2004 interview, Young recalled:

We were all really high, fucked up ... Been out partying. Wrote it sitting up at Vista Point on Skyline. Supposed to be the highest point in San Mateo County, which was appropriate. I wrote it when I couldn’t sing. I was on voice rest. It was nuts – I was whistling it. I wrote a lot of songs when I couldn’t talk.

The bridge into the chorus of "Like a Hurricane" was inspired by Del Shannon's 1961 song "Runaway".

== Reception ==
Cash Box said that "the melodies are carried by Young's voice and guitar, all brought into focus against a distant landscape of multi-layered string effects."

== Cover versions ==
Recorded for music release:

- Roxy Music released their live version of the song, recorded at the Glasgow Apollo in 1982, on the 1983 EP The High Road and the live LP Heart Still Beating.
- The song was also covered by The Mission on their second single "Garden of Delight". It was later included on the album The First Chapter (a compilation of their first singles) and Ever After - Live.
- Jay Farrar, backed by country-rock band Canyon, covered this song on his live album Stone, Steel, & Bright Lights.
- Heather Nova recorded the song at a 1995 concert in Hiroshima, released on import-only CD singles Maybe An Angel (Japan) and Truth & Bone (Germany). She also included it in her all-covers 2022 album Other Shores.
- Jeff Healey covered the song on his 2008 posthumous album Mess of Blues.
- The Coal Porters covered the song on the 2010 album Durango.
- Adam Sandler covered the song on the 2009 album Covered, A Revolution in Sound, of Warner Brothers artists performing cover songs. He also performed the song on the Late Show with David Letterman, to promote the release.
- Jason Isbell and The 400 Unit covered the song on the 2012 album Live From Alabama.
- New Orleans singer Theresa Andersson sings it in the 2006 film New Orleans Music in Exile.
- In 2018, Pony Boy (the recording pseudonym of Los Angeles singer-songwriter Marchelle Bradanini) covered the song on a split 7-inch single with Australian singer Emma Swift, on which both musicians covered Neil Young songs.
- Mortemia and DIANNE (Dianne van Giersbergen) covered the song on the 2025 Cover Collab Sessions.

== Personnel ==
- Neil Young – lead guitar and lead vocals
- Frank "Poncho" Sampedro – Stringman synthesizer and background vocals
- Billy Talbot – bass guitar and background vocals
- Ralph Molina – drums and background vocals

== See also ==
- The Unplugged Collection, Volume One
