= After the Gold Rush (song) =

1970 song written by Neil Young

- 2020 re-release

Song by Neil Young

from the album After the Gold Rush
- Released: August 31, 1970
- Recorded: March 12, 1970
- Studio: Redwood Studios, Topanga, California (Young's home)
- Genre: Folk rock; baroque pop
- Length: 3:45
- Label: Reprise
- Songwriter: Neil Young
- Producers: Neil Young; David Briggs

Music video
- "After the Gold Rush" on YouTube

"After the Goldrush"

Single by Prelude

from the album After the Gold Rush
- B-side: "Johnson Boy"
- Released: 1974
- Recorded: 1974
- Genre: A cappella
- Length: 2:01
- Label: Island
- Songwriter: Neil Young
- Producer: Fritz Fryer

Prelude singles chronology
| "Out There" (1973) | "After the Goldrush" (1974) | "Dear Jesus" (1974) |

Official audio
- "After the Gold Rush" on YouTube

"After the Gold Rush" is a song written and performed by Neil Young from his 1970 album of the same name. In addition to After the Gold Rush, it also appears on the compilation albums Decade and Greatest Hits and the live album Live Rust.

An a capella version of the song was a hit in many countries in 1974 for the English vocal group Prelude.

"After the Gold Rush" is ranked number 323 on the 2021 edition of Rolling Stone's 500 Greatest Songs of All Time.

== Composition ==
Dolly Parton, who covered "After the Gold Rush" with Emmylou Harris and Linda Ronstadt for their 1999 collaborative album Trio II, stated that Young himself does not know what the song is about:

I loved the song on Neil Young's [1970] album and I loved it when Prelude had it out in 1974. But I didn't know what the song meant. Linda and Emmy knew Neil, so we called him and asked him. He said, 'I have no idea.' I thought that was so funny. I think it's about the Second Coming or the invasion of aliens, or both.

In his 2012 autobiography, Young gave a different explanation of the song's origin and meaning, describing the inspiration provided by an unproduced screenplay of the same name by actor Dean Stockwell and lyricist Herb Bermann which described California being destroyed in a catastrophic flood. The screenplay's title referred to the California gold rush. Young concluded that:

After The Gold Rush is an environmental song... I recognize in it now this thread that goes through a lotta my songs that’s this time-travel thing... When I look out the window, the first thing that comes to my mind is the way this place looked a hundred years ago.

"After the Gold Rush" consists of three verses which move forward in time from the past (a medieval celebration) to the present (the singer "lying in a burned-out basement") and finally to the far future (in which "chosen ones" are evacuated from Earth in "silver spaceships"). The line "Look at Mother Nature on the run / In the 1970s" has been amended by Young in concert to match the then-present time, most recently to "Look at Mother Nature on the run / in the 21st century."

On the original recording, Young accompanies himself on piano and Bill Peterson provides a French horn solo. The horn solo in the song is typically replaced by a harmonica solo by Young in live performances.

== Personnel ==
- Neil Young – piano, vocals
- Bill Peterson – flugelhorn

== Cover versions and performances ==
The song has been covered numerous times. Among the most notable are the following:

- A 1974 a capella interpretation by Prelude was a top 40 hit in numerous countries, especially the UK where it re-charted in the Top 40 in 1982, and in Canada where it reached number five in 1974. The song also peaked in Australia at number 51 in 1974, and a re-recording at 98 in 1982 (for their eponymous album released the same year). In the US, it went to number 22 on the Billboard Hot 100.
- Guitarist Michael Hedges recorded an instrumental version, with Michael Manring playing the melody on fretless bass, for his 1984 album Aerial Boundaries.
- The supergroup of Dolly Parton, Emmylou Harris, and Linda Ronstadt covered the song on their 1999 album Trio II with two changes to the lyrics: The line "Look at Mother Nature on the run / In the 1970s" became "Look at Mother Nature on the run / in the 20th century", and the line "There was a band playin' in my head / And I felt like getting high" was changed to "There was a band playin' in my head / And I felt like I could cry." According to Harris, "We asked permission to change the line about getting high because we were mothers, and we didn't want to put forward that sentiment." Parton performed the song during the 61st Annual Grammy Awards ceremony with Maren Morris and Miley Cyrus. The Trio version of the song was also released as a single. It received modest radio airplay, a video accompanying the song was very popular on a number of cable video outlets (including CMT), and the song received the Grammy Award for Best Country Collaboration with Vocals in 2000.
- Comedian John Early covered the song in his 2023 special, "Now More Than Ever."
- Canadian singer k.d. lang covered the song on her 2004 album Hymns of the 49th Parallel.
