= Cortez the Killer =

Song by Neil Young

from the album Zuma
- Released: November 10, 1975
- Recorded: May 22, 1975
- Studio: Point Dume, California
- Genre: Hard rock; blues rock; Folk
- Length: 7:29
- Label: Reprise
- Songwriter: Neil Young
- Producers: Neil Young; David Briggs

"Cortez the Killer" is a song by Canadian-American singer-songwriter Neil Young from his 1975 album, Zuma. It was recorded with the band Crazy Horse. It has since been ranked No. 39 on Guitar World's 100 Greatest Guitar Solos and No. 329 on Rolling Stone's list of the 500 Greatest Songs of All Time.

Young has stated in concert that he wrote the song while studying history in high school in Winnipeg. According to Young's notes for the album Decade, the song was banned in Spain under Francisco Franco; according to Xavier Valiño, when Zuma was released in Spain following Franco's death, the song was listed as "Cortez, Cortez".

== Lyrics and interpretation ==
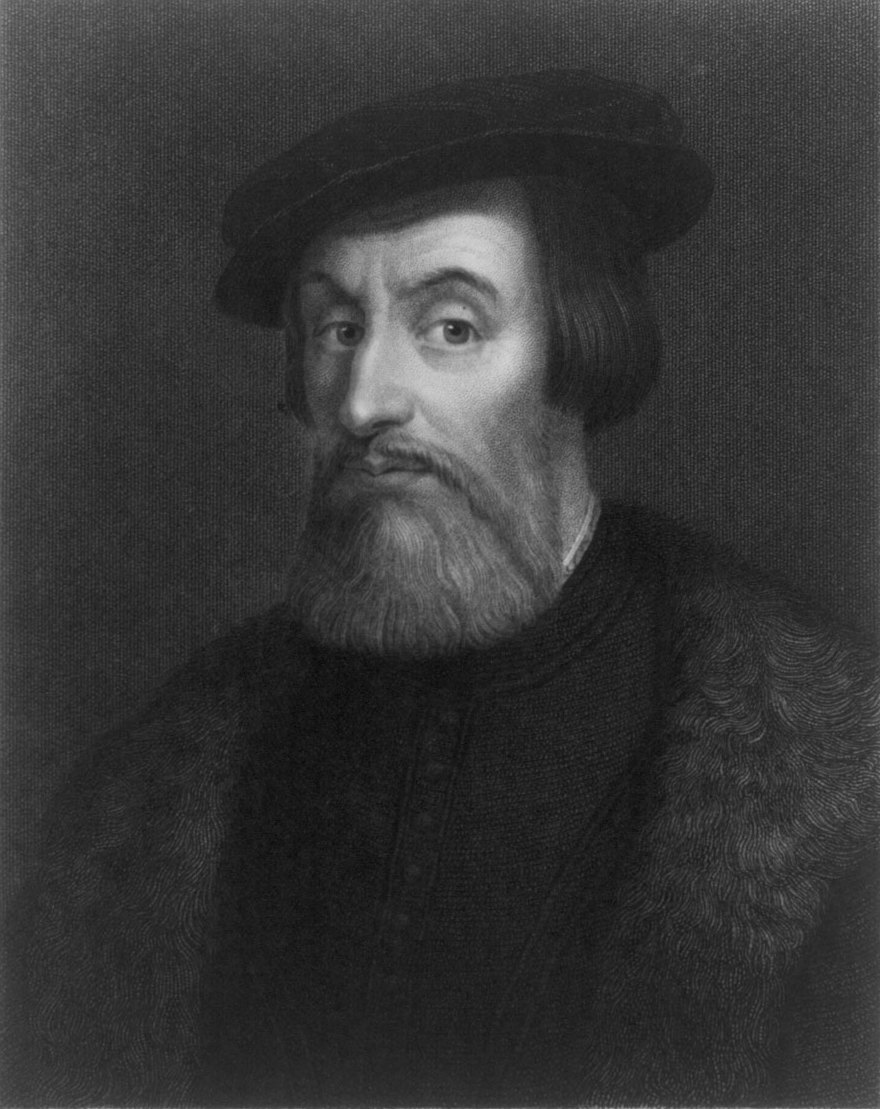
Hernán Cortés, the inspiration behind the song's title

The song is inspired by Hernán Cortés's conquest of the Aztec Empire under Moctezuma II in the 16th century.

The lyrics of the song do not focus on historical accuracy or realism and include unrelated personal perspectives. For instance, instead of describing Cortés's battles with the Aztecs, the last verse jumps to a first-person perspective with a reference to an unnamed woman: "And I know she's living there / And she loves me to this day / I still can't remember when / or how I lost my way." Young had recently ended his relationship with Carrie Snodgress when the song was recorded.

Rolling Stone in 2011 criticized the song for having a few facts about Cortez "dead wrong".

On a more cynical note, in Jimmy McDonough's biography of Young, Shakey, Young stated: "What the fuck am I doing writing about Aztecs in 'Cortez the Killer' like I was there, wandering around? 'Cause I only read about it in a few books. A lotta shit I just made up because it came to me." Young continued in a December 1995 interview in Mojo: "It was a combination of imagination and knowledge. What Cortez represented to me is the explorer with two sides, one benevolent, the other utterly ruthless. I mean, look at Columbus! Everyone now knows he was less than great. And he wasn't even there first (laughs). It always makes me question all these other so-called icons."

== Composition ==
The song is typical of the Zuma album, with simple chords and gradually rising and falling tension. The song repeats the chords Em7, D and Am11 while Young adds his signature solos throughout. It is played in Young's favored double drop D tuning (DADGBD).

The song fades out after nearly seven and a half minutes, as (according to Young's father in Neil and Me) a circuit in the mixing console had blown. In addition to losing the rest of the instrumental work, a final verse was also lost. When producer David Briggs had to break this news to the band, Young replied: "I never liked that verse anyway."

The additional verse resurfaced on his 2024 tour with Crazy Horse:

But I floated on the water,
And I ate that ocean wave.
Two weeks after the slaughter,
I was livin’ in a cave.
They came too late to get me,
There’s no one here to set me free,
From this rocky grave,
To that snow-capped ocean wave.

== Personnel ==
- Neil Young – guitar, vocals
- Frank Sampedro – guitar
- Billy Talbot – bass
- Ralph Molina – drums

== Cover versions ==
- The Church covered the song on the cover album A Box of Birds.
- The song was covered live by Slint, with a version being released on the 2014 deluxe reissue of their album Spiderland.
- The song has been covered live by the Dave Matthews Band, with Warren Haynes, at their concert in Central Park in 2003 and Dave Matthews and Tim Reynolds with Jason Isbell at Moon Palace in Riviera Maya on February 16, 2024. Dave Matthews & Tim Reynolds - FULL SHOW 2/16/2024 Mexico N1 (40:00)
- Built to Spill recorded a version for their 2000 album Live that, with several guitar solos throughout, came to over twenty minutes in length.
- A live version by Matthew Sweet appears on the Legacy edition of his album Girlfriend.
- Screaming Females released a cover of this song on a 2008 7" split with "Hunchback".
- David Rawlings covered the song on his 2009 album A Friend of a Friend, where it appears as the latter half of a medley; the first section is the Bright Eyes song "Method Acting".
- Jim Jarmusch, Bradford Cox, and Randy Randall covered the song in 2009 for a video on the website of Pitchfork.
- Metal band Prong covered the song on the 2015 covers album Songs from the Black Hole.
- Dinosaur Jr. and J Mascis + The Fog frequently cover the song live with lengthy improvised guitar solos. Both bands feature J Mascis on guitar.
