= American Stars 'n Bars =

Studio album by Neil Young and Crazy Horse
- Released: May 27, 1977
- Recorded: December 13, 1974 – April 4, 1977
- Studios: Quadrafonic, Nashville; Broken Arrow Ranch, Redwood City, California; Indigo, Malibu
- Genres: Heartland rock; country rock; folk rock; blues rock
- Length: 37:54
- Labels: Reprise; Warner Bros.
- Producers: Neil Young; David Briggs; Tim Mulligan; Elliot Mazer ("Star of Bethlehem")

Neil Young and Crazy Horse chronology
| Long May You Run (1976) | American Stars 'n Bars (1977) | Decade (1977) |

Singles from American Stars 'n Bars
- 1. "Hey Babe" / "Homegrown" Released: June 1977; 2. "Like a Hurricane" / "Hold Back the Tears" Released: August 1977

American Stars 'n Bars is the eighth studio album by Canadian-American folk rock songwriter Neil Young, released on Reprise Records in 1977. Compiled from recording sessions scattered over a 29-month period, it includes "Like a Hurricane", one of Young's best-known songs. It peaked at number 21 on the Billboard 200 and received a RIAA gold certification.

== Background ==
Following the release of his album, Zuma, in November 1975, and a subsequent international spring tour with Crazy Horse, Young rekindled his partnership with Stephen Stills. Following the album Long May You Run, and a promotional tour that Young abandoned, he continued touring with Crazy Horse in the United States, then spent the first half of 1977 off the road. After recording several country rock compositions at sessions in April 1977, he assembled additional tracks from a variety of earlier recording dates to make up the second side of the new album.

"Homegrown" and "Star of Bethlehem" had initially been slated for his album Homegrown, which was shelved at the time. Both of those songs, along with "Like a Hurricane", "Hold Back the Tears" and "Will to Love", had also been slated for the unreleased Young album project, Chrome Dreams. Seven of the nine tracks feature his regular backing band Crazy Horse, and another, "Star of Bethlehem", features country music star Emmylou Harris. Songs from the April 1977 sessions are all in a country-styled vein, while the tracks from the second side are all in their original forms from their respective recording sessions (spanning 1974–1976).

== Writing ==
"The Old Country Waltz" tells the tale of listening to a live band in a bar while drinking to get over the loss of a loved one. It was previously recorded on piano and harmonica in August 1976 during the Hitchhiker session.

"Saddle Up the Palomino" features sexually suggestive lyrics and was likely written in 1974 or 1975 during the Homegrown sessions. A handwritten song list on the Neil Young Archives website from that era includes a song titled "Carmelina". It is credited to Young, bassist Tim Drummond and Louisiana songwriter and friend Bobby Charles who was part of Young's social scene in Malibu in 1975.

"Hold Back the Tears" had previously been recorded in February 1977 as a solo performance with Young playing guitar, keyboards and percussion. This version would see release on Chrome Dreams in 2023. Its lyrics find Young consoling a friend over the loss of a relationship and counseling that the next love may be just around the corner.

"Bite the Bullet", which also features suggestive lyrics, combines the emerging genres of outlaw country and punk rock. It was written in July 1976 in Charlotte, North Carolina during the Stills-Young tour, and made its live debut that month.

"Star of Bethlehem"'s lyrics are about coming to terms with the end of a relationship. The song was originally intended to conclude the shelved album Homegrown. Its lyrics are inspired by Young's breakup with Carrie Snodgress. Young would debut the song on tour with CSNY with an additional verse. In a 1975 Cameron Crowe interview for Rolling Stone, Young indicated a fondness for the track and an eagerness to release it, singling out the "beautiful harmonies" of Emmylou Harris.

In "Will to Love", Young tells "the story of a salmon swimming upstream. Laden with my own feelings of love and survival." Young has performed the song only once, the night he recorded at his home in front of a roaring fire.

"Like a Hurricane", one of Young's signature songs, recounts a tempestuous romance, as Young described in a 2020 post to his website: "She had so much love he couldn't handle it. She was always a step away but he loved her forever. He just couldn't reach her. But he did, and she never forgot that." In a September 1982 interview, Young said: "I wrote it on an organ, on the string synthesizer. I remember the night I wrote it, I stayed up all night playing it after I wrote it. It always had a feeling to me that it was going to take off. It was never going to be a peaceful little song." In his memoir Special Deluxe, Young recalls bar hopping on Skyline Boulevard:

"... we pulled over at Skeggs Point Scenic Lookout to park and enjoy some cocaine... There was a newspaper in the backseat with me and I picked up a felt-tip marker, one of my favorite writing tools, and scratched out a few words. Later that night when I got back to the ranch, I sat down at the electric organ I had built... The unearthly sound resonated in my little cabin for hours and hours while I uncovered the melody and chords that dwelled in those lyrics I had written in Taylor’s DeSoto."

"Homegrown", a lighthearted tribute to marijuana, was first recorded as the title track of the unreleased album.

== Recording ==
Side two of the album consists of recordings made in various studios over the previous two years.

"Star of Bethlehem" was recorded in December, 1974 at Quadrafonic Sound Studios during sessions for Homegrown. According to a post on the Neil Young Archives website, Ben Keith and Emmylou Harris would overdub the background vocals for the track at Harris' L.A. home.

"Homegrown" and "Like a Hurricane" were recorded in November 1975 with Crazy Horse at Young's ranch during rehearsals for a short tour of Northern California, his first with the reconstituted band with guitarist Poncho Sampedro. The group recorded "Hurricane" at Young's ranch shortly after Young wrote the song and the take on the album is the initial run-through. Young wrote in Waging Heavy Peace:

"Like a Hurricane" is probably the best example of Old Black's tone, although if you listen too closely, it is all but ruined by all the mistakes and misfires in my playing... Most often the first time something is played is the defining moment... That is why it just cuts on at the beginning. There was no beginning. There was no end. It is one of those performances you can never repeat; the cherry, the original expression of the song, the essence. We just kept wailing on those changes until we couldn't move anymore."

Young had recently undergone vocal surgery and was unable to record a live vocal. Vocals were overdubbed in January 1976 at Village Recorders in Los Angeles. He explained in Special Deluxe:

"The instrumental passages on this recording are some of our best Crazy Horse moments, with Poncho playing a great part on the Stringman keyboard, an amazing analog string synthesizer. It is a very emotional ride... I loved that track. I knew I had to finish it. The Horse was cosmic. Those sketches are the vocals we used on the final record of "Like a Hurricane."

"Will to Love" was recorded in April 1976, at Young's home in front of a roaring fire, the only time he has performed the song. He would later mix the recording and add overdubs during a full moon session at Indigo Ranch in Malibu, as recounted in Waging Heavy Peace: "Sitting on the floor late at night, I recorded in front of the fireplace with the cassette on the hearth, three feet from the fire, and you can hear the crackling and hissing of the fire as I played my old Martin guitar and sang." Young mixed the track and added overdubs at Indigo Ranch Recording studio eight months later with his producer David Briggs: "I had asked David to get me a lot of instruments, including drums, an electric bass, a vibraphone, some of my old amps including my Magnatone with the stereo vibrato, and a few other things. I told David that I simply wanted to play back the cassette through the Magnatone with vibrato so it would sound like I was underwater at times during the song, when I was taking the point of view of the salmon."

Finally, Young and Briggs mixed the song that same night, and played back the results to Young's great satisfaction: "Somewhere in the middle of that night, we did a mix. That was the perfect way to work. Get it all at once... The sound was cascading over me and all around me, and I was swimming in it. Our work was done. That memory is one of my favorite moments and is the perfect example of a great life with my friend David, who guided me and assisted me in every trip I decided to take through the world of music."

The songs on side one were recorded in a single day at Young's ranch on April 4, 1977. The April 1977 sessions featured Crazy Horse augmented by an ad hoc grouping dubbed "The Bullets": pedal steel guitarist and longtime Young collaborator Ben Keith, violinist Carole Mayedo, and backing vocalists Linda Ronstadt and Nicolette Larson. Young had previously recorded with Ronstadt on Harvest. Young recruited Larson after reaching out to other singers and several had recommended her. The three met at Young's Malibu home where he introduced the two singers to twenty of his songs he had available to record. Larson tells Cameron Crowe in December 1978: "I didn't know much about Neil Young, but we went over and sat by the fireplace and Neil ran down all the songs he had just written, about twenty of them. We sang harmonies with him and he was jazzed." Sessions were held at the white house on Young's ranch. The musicians were under the impression that they were rehearsing while the takes used on the album were being recorded. Recalls Larson: "We worked out the songs in a room of his house. And just when we had the songs down, Neil said, 'Thanks a lot...we've got the album.' He was recording all the rehearsals secretly in another room."

== Album cover ==
The album cover was designed by actor and Young's close friend Dean Stockwell, who had also written the screenplay that inspired After the Gold Rush. It features Connie Moskos, then the girlfriend of producer David Briggs, drooping with a bottle of Canadian whisky in her hand and an intoxicated Young with his face pressed against the glass floor.

== Release ==
American Stars 'n' Bars was released May 1977. It was released after the compilation Decade had already been compiled. Young and producer David Briggs decided that the compilation should be delayed so that "Like a Hurricane" could appear on its own album, not just on a three-record set. Briggs and Young called manager Elliot Roberts to adjust the release dates with the record company accordingly. Briggs would relate the decision in a contemporary radio interview:

"We were on the road, on a gig, and we were driving between Houston and Madison, Wisconsin. We said to ourselves, 'Wow, "Hurricane", that's a really good cut. It should have its own album to be on instead of being released with 32 other songs. We had already pressed 500,000 copies of Decade... So at three in the morning we called up, from the bus, on the road, to Neil's manager and said, 'Hey man, I don't think we should put Decade out until we put "Hurricane" out on its own record. Why don't you call up Warners and tell them so?'"

== Reception ==
Professional ratings
Review scores
| Source | Rating |
|---|---|
| AllMusic | 3/5 stars |
| Christgau's Record Guide | B+ |
| Pitchfork | 8.3/10 |

The album received favorable reviews. Writing in Rolling Stone, Paul Nelson noted the mixed selection of songs and styles and praised the "gale-force guitar playing" on "Like a Hurricane". He concluded that the album "can almost be taken as a sampler, but not a summation, of Young's various styles from After the Gold Rush and Harvest (much of the country rock) through On the Beach (the incredible "Will to Love") to Zuma ("Like a Hurricane" is a worthy successor to "Cortez the Killer" as a guitar showcase) with a lot of overlap within the songs". In a review for AllMusic, William Ruhlmann found the album to be "a stylistic hodgepodge, its first side consisting of country-tinged material" while the second side ranged from "acoustic solo numbers... to raging rockers". Describing "Will to Love" as "a particularly spooky and ambitious piece", he said that "[the] album's centerpiece however, is "Like a Hurricane," one of Young's classic hard rock songs and guitar workouts, and a perpetual concert favorite".

It was finally released on compact disc, as an HDCD, on August 19, 2003, as part of the Neil Young Digital Masterpiece Series along with On the Beach, Hawks & Doves, and Re-ac-tor.

== Track listing ==
All tracks are written by Neil Young except "Saddle Up the Palomino" written with Tim Drummond and Bobby Charles. All songs recorded at Broken Arrow Ranch except for "Star of Bethlehem" recorded at Quadrafonic Sound Studios in Nashville.

Side one
| No. | Title | Recording date | Length |
|---|---|---|---|
| 1. | "The Old Country Waltz" | April 4, 1977 | 2:58 |
| 2. | "Saddle Up the Palomino" | April 4, 1977 | 3:00 |
| 3. | "Hey Babe" | April 4, 1977 | 3:35 |
| 4. | "Hold Back the Tears" | April 4, 1977 | 4:18 |
| 5. | "Bite the Bullet" | April 4, 1977 | 3:30 |

Side two
| No. | Title | Recording date | Length |
|---|---|---|---|
| 1. | "Star of Bethlehem" | December 13, 1974 | 2:42 |
| 2. | "Will to Love" | April 25, 1976 | 7:11 |
| 3. | "Like a Hurricane" | November 29, 1975 | 8:20 |
| 4. | "Homegrown" | November 19, 1975 | 2:20 |

== Personnel ==
Side one (credited to Neil Young, Crazy Horse and the Bullets)

- Neil Young – guitar, vocals
- Frank "Poncho" Sampedro – guitar
- Billy Talbot – bass
- Ralph Molina – drums
- Ben Keith – pedal steel guitar
- Carole Mayedo – violin
- Linda Ronstadt – backing vocals
- Nicolette Larson – backing vocals

Side two

"Star of Bethlehem"

- Neil Young – guitar, vocals, harmonica
- Ben Keith – dobro, vocals
- Tim Drummond – bass
- Karl T. Himmel – drums
- Emmylou Harris – vocals

"Will to Love"

- Neil Young – guitar, vocals, organ, piano, vibraphone, drums

"Like a Hurricane" (credited to Neil Young and Crazy Horse)

- Neil Young – guitar, vocals
- Frank "Poncho" Sampedro – Stringman, vocals
- Billy Talbot – bass
- Ralph Molina – drums, vocals

"Homegrown" (credited to Neil Young and Crazy Horse)

- Neil Young – guitar, vocals
- Frank "Poncho" Sampedro – guitar, vocals
- Billy Talbot – bass
- Ralph Molina – drums, vocals

Additional roles

- Neil Young, David Briggs, Tim Mulligan, Elliot Mazer – production
- Dean Stockwell – cover art
- Elliot Roberts – direction

== Charts ==
Chart performance for American Stars 'n Bar
| Chart (1977) | Peak position |
|---|---|
| Australia (Kent Music Report) | 21 |
| US Billboard Top LPs & Tape | 21 |
| UK Album Charts | 17 |
| Canadian RPM 100 Albums | 16 |
| Finnish Album Charts | 30 |
| French Album Charts | 4 |
| Japanese Album Charts | 63 |
| Swedish Album Charts | 16 |
| Norwegian VG-lista Albums | 5 |
| New Zealand Album Charts | 35 |
| Dutch MegaCharts Albums | 5 |
| US Cash Box Top 100 Albums | 16 |
| US Record World Album Chart | 33 |

Year End Album Charts

| Chart (1977) | Rank |
|---|---|
| Canada Album Charts | 96 |

== Certifications ==
| Region | Certification | Certified units/sales |
|---|---|---|
| United Kingdom (BPI) | Silver | 60,000^{^} |
| United States (RIAA) | Gold | 500,000^{^} |
^{^} Shipments figures based on certification alone.
