= Comes a Time =

Studio album by Neil Young
- Released: October 21, 1978
- Recorded: January 10, 1976 – November 21, 1977
- Studios: Triiad (Fort Lauderdale); Columbia Recording (London); Wally Heider (San Francisco); Woodland (Nashville); Sound Shop (Nashville); Broken Arrow Ranch (Redwood City)
- Genre: Country folk
- Length: 37:15
- Label: Reprise
- Producers: Neil Young; David Briggs; Ben Keith; Tim Mulligan

Neil Young chronology
Decade (1977)	Comes a Time (1978)	Rust Never Sleeps (1979)

Singles from Comes a Time
- 1. "Comes a Time" / "Motorcycle Mama" Released: November 1978; 2. "Four Strong Winds" / "Human Highway" Released: 1978

Comes a Time is the ninth studio album by Canadian-American singer-songwriter Neil Young, released by Reprise Records in October 1978. The album is largely performed in a quiet folk and country style. It features backing harmonies sung by Nicolette Larson and additional accompaniment by musicians that had accompanied Young on his commercial pinnacle, Harvest. Like Harvest, the lyrics to many of its songs are inspired by relationships. In his memoir Waging Heavy Peace, Young describes Comes a Time as one of his best albums.

== Background ==
After the success of his 1972 album Harvest, Young famously shied away from his new public image as a sentimental singer-songwriter, and released several albums that embrace contrasting styles. Comes a Time finds the artist re-embracing a more romantic folk style and image once again. The album also features layers of overdubs and a large cast of supporting musicians, a contrast to his typical preference for live in the studio recording.

Young would describe the change in a contemporary interview: "After five or six albums going in one direction, my feelings demanded that I really craft an album. It came out outward, clean and appealing. It's the first record I've released where I'm actually facing the audience on the jacket and smiling."

== Writing ==
The songs on Comes a Time were written over the course of the previous five years in a variety of contexts. Young had first played the songs with various other bands, including Crosby, Stills, Nash & Young, Crazy Horse and the Ducks. The songs' lyrics were inspired by several different personal events and romantic relationships.

The lyrics to "Goin' Back" reflect feeling nostalgia for a previous time or place. Young explains in Shakey: "There's something there that's me, that record. It tells a story– "Goin' Back" is sorta like the debris of the sixties. There's nowhere to stay, nowhere to go and nothin' to do. You could go anywhere."

"Comes a Time" dates from Young's performances in the summer of 1977 with the Ducks. When introducing it in concert the following year, he shares that he first remembered singing it with his son Zeke.

"Look Out for My Love" features imagery of being on an airplane eager to arrive home to one's partner, while pondering if the relationship is a burden on his partner. Singer-songwriter Randy Newman applauds the song's idiosyncratic lyrics: "It isn't like a love song. It's like, 'My love, it’s really heavy. Watch out! It's in your neighborhood.' Like a stalker."

"Lotta Love" was recorded with Crazy Horse in January 1976 with guitarist Poncho Sampedro on piano. Nicolette Larson would release her own recording of the song in 1978, which became a top ten hit. She remembers discovering the song on the floor of Young's truck during sessions for American Stars 'n Bars: "I visited Neil at the ranch, we were driving around in a pickup, there was a cassette on the floor. I picked it up, blew the dust off it, I stuck it in the cassette player and "Lotta Love" came on. I said, 'Neil, that's a really good song.' He said, 'You want it—it's yours.'"

"Peace of Mind" was first performed on tour with Crazy Horse in 1976.

"Human Highway" dates from 1973, and was first recorded in the summer of that year in Hawaii by Crosby, Stills, Nash & Young for an album that would have shared the same title.

"Already One" was written about his relationships with Carrie Snodgress and their son Zeke. In a 2020 post to the Archives website, Young states that on Comes a Time, "One of the best tracks (imho) is "Already One". That song still resonates strongly with me today. I wrote it about Carrie, Zeke's mom. She was a very special person and I still see her and love her in Zeke today."

"Motorcycle Mama" dates from the sessions for Homegrown in January 1975. The month prior, Young went on his first date with his wife Pegi, whom he would marry in 1978. Pegi was fond of riding motorcycles, a characteristic Young sings about in his later portrait of her, "Unknown Legend".

"Four Strong Winds", which closes the album, is a cover of the 1963 Canadian folk song by Ian and Sylvia. Young had previously performed the song with The Band in their film The Last Waltz. The song carries special importance to Young, who fell in love with the song as a teenager. He explains during the 2005 concert for his film Heart of Gold:

"When I [was] just a kid, sixteen or seventeen years old, I went to this place out near Winnipeg where I grew up and it's called Falcon Lake. It's just one of those first times when you really got away from home and were on your own. I was just kind of feeling it for the first time. There was this little kind of a restaurant place with a jukebox in it that was there. And I used to go there. And I think I spent all my money playing this next song - over and over again. It was the most beautiful record that I've ever heard in my life and I just could not get enough of it."

He continues to explain in the biography Shakey that he loved "The song, melody, the whole thing. It had a message too, y’know—leaving things behind. That feeling of something's not gonna work. There's a feeling in the song that I related to." He further elaborates in his memoir Special Deluxe how the song touched him deeply, and how it motivated to try to capture that same feeling in his own songs:

"I loved that song. I had the feeling that it was about my life, and the music touched me deeply. I completely related to it and lived it every time I listened. It was everything to me. There was something about how immersed I was in that song that made me realize I had to get the same quality into my own music. I started singing along, loudly if I was alone and quietly if anyone was near enough to hear me. I knew my voice was high and I could tell that I sang in a different way from real singers, but in my soul, in my heart, I knew I was really singing and it felt right."

== Recording ==
The first sessions for the album were held at Triiad Studios in Fort Lauderdale, Florida in September, 1977. Young recorded solo acoustic performances of several of the album's songs, often with layers of overdubs performed by himself. Overdubs were also added to the Hitchhiker recording of "Pocahontas", which later appeared on Rust Never Sleeps. "Lost in Space" on Hawks and Doves also dates from these sessions. Young compiled a solo album from the sessions, entitled Oceanside/Countryside. Young describes his process at these sessions in the biography Shakey:

"I made most of Comes a Time in Florida by myself, with these kids that were startin' a recording studio—Triad. It was great. Used to come in in the afternoon and work three, four hours, go home. Did it all during the day. Acoustic guitars. Come in, lay down a basic, then I overdubbed—all me. Do overdubs on it with my acoustics, try a whole bunch of stuff. I did all kinds of things there—"Lost in Space" "Pocahontas" "Human Highway" "Goin' Back. That was one point where I think overdubbing worked, especially on that one song, "Goin' Back." "Goin' Back" was originally done in Triad. I did all the guitars by myself and went to Nashville and put the other stuff on there—put Nicolette on there. That's one of my favorite records. It's funky. Not that it's technically great, that's for sure. The sounds are a little muddled. It's got a great amount of feeling. It had a lot of feeling in its straight acoustic versions, too."

When Young played the album for Reprise executive Mo Ostin, Ostin asked him if he would consider adding rhythm tracks to what he already had. Young agreed and scheduled additional sessions in Nashville with a full band in November, 1977. For the sessions, Young recruited musicians that had previously backed Young on the albums Harvest and Homegrown, including Ben Keith, bassist Tim Drummond and drummer Karl T. Himmel. He also employed the backing vocals of Nicolette Larson.

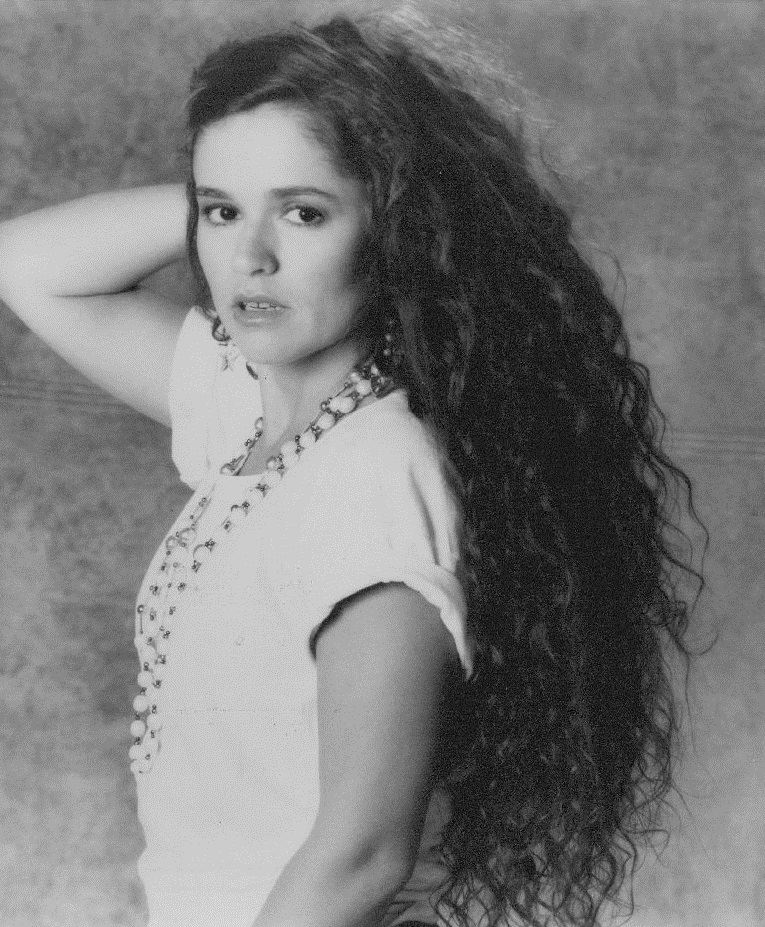
Nicolette Larson (pictured in 1985) sang harmonies on most of the songs.

Larson sings harmony vocals on most of the tracks and shares lead vocals with Young on "Motorcycle Mama". Young had previously recorded with Larson on his previous album, American Stars 'n Bars. According to Young archivist and photographer Joel Bernstein,

"With the possible exception of Danny Whitten, Nicolette sang better with Neil than anyone. Nicolette and Danny absolutely were the two best singers with Neil who really understood his singing, his soulfulness, and what to get across. When you hear Comes a Time now, many years later, it pulls at your heartstrings as much as it did the first time you heard it."

Five of the album's songs, "Goin' Back", "Comes a Time", "Already One", "Piece of Mind" and "Four Strong Winds" feature performances by more than thirty musicians, creating a Phil Spector-esque wall of sound. Young particularly raves about the session that produced the song "Comes a Time" in his memoir, Waging Heavy Peace:

"The song "Comes a Time" is one of my all-time favorite recordings because it just has a great feeling. The song and the performance are a total mesh. Nicolette's singing is beautiful. I can see all the pictures. That is as close to a perfect recording as I ever have gotten. Karl Himmel laid down a unique groove on drums, and the band was locked in. Karl has the ability to play two grooves at once, which I have never heard anyone else do as well as he does. He is a completely unique musician. Chuck Cochran did the string arrangement. Rufus Thibodeaux played fiddle. J.J. Cale played a guitar on it. Ben Keith played steel. Spooner Oldham played piano. There was a rhythm guitar section with six great guitarists all playing rhythm on old Martin acoustics. Everyone played and it was the country wall of sound, the Gone With the Wind Orchestra. What a sound!"

Two songs on the album, "Look Out for My Love" and "Lotta Love", feature Young's long-time backing band, Crazy Horse and were recorded in January 1976. In Special Deluxe, Young remembers the difficulty of recording "Look Out for My Love" and relays a funny anecdote of how it was finally captured on tape:

"We were having a lot of trouble getting it right and time was dragging on. It was four or five in the morning and we were still going at it. Probably cocaine was keeping us going when we should have given up. It was during the introduction to the song that the door to the studio playing room opened and Ellen Talbot, Johnny's wife, danced slowly in and pulled down her jeans, showing us all her ass. Well, that was the take! It woke us up and we finally got it."

Additional songs were attempted during the sessions. The recordings of "Pocahontas" and "Sail Away" from Rust Never Sleeps date from the sessions but were ultimately left off the album. A personal acetate of an early version of the album, listed for sale by Young archivist Joel Bernstein, includes the songs "Dance Dance Dance" and "Country Home" in the running order for the album, in place of the Crazy Horse tracks.

== Production ==
Young took special pride in the production of the album, even purchasing the first 200,000 copies of the album when a mastering defect was discovered. The artist had been unhappy with the album's sound, owing to damage that occurred to the master tape during shipment to the mixing facility. "All of the high frequency was missing from my master! I couldn't believe it when I got those dull test pressings and checked the master tape. It was severely damaged somehow. I don't know what happened to it." Young would explain in a November 1978 interview with Tony Schwartz for Newsweek: "Musically, I get crazy when it's not right. The record company said, 'Fine, we'll redo it, and we'll mix the first 200,000 in with the rest later.' I said no, but to make sure, I bought all the faulty records back. People say I'm crazy, but that's OK. Now I'm happy with the album." The version of the album most widely available today was personally remixed by Young from the safety copy of the original master. Young stored the faulty records at his ranch. In Neil and Me, his father Scott Young remembers seeing the discarded records at Neil's ranch: "Each case of albums had been fired at with a rifle, piercing each record and making it unusable." In a March 2014 interview with Rolling Stone, Young clarified that he used the discarded LPs as shingles for a barn roof.

== Promotion ==
Young performed a single concert with the musicians who back him on the album. He dubbed the group the "Gone with the Wind Orchestra". On November 12th, 1977, the group performed a free concert in benefit of a children's hospital at Miami's Bicentennial Park. The setlist is notable for a cover of "Sweet Home Alabama", performed in memory of Ronnie Van Zandt and the other members of Lynyrd Skynyrd who perished in an accident the previous month. In Waging Heavy Peace, Young laments not having the concert recorded. However, a rehearsal for the concert at Musicians Music Hall in Nashville was recorded. Young expresses a desire to release the performance in his third Archives set.

In May 1978, Young performed acoustic sets at the Boarding House in San Francisco, and toured with Crazy Horse in the fall of that year. Both sets of concerts would feature different material and would be recorded for his next albums Rust Never Sleeps and Live Rust.

== Critical reception ==
Retrospective professional reviews
Review scores
Source	Rating
AllMusic	4.5/5 stars
Christgau's Record Guide	A
Rolling Stone	5/5 stars
Spin Alternative Record Guide	9/10
Tom Hull – on the Web	A

Reviewing for The Village Voice in October 1978, Robert Christgau hailed Comes a Time as a "tour de force" for its folkie concept and music, with melodies that rival those of Young's After the Gold Rush (1970) and a sound that is "almost always quiet, usually acoustic and drumless, and sweetened by Nicolette Larson". While noting that listeners may "wonder why this thirty-two-year-old hasn't learned more about Long-Term Relationships", Christgau was ultimately won over by "the spare, good-natured assurance of the singing and playing" for how it "deepens the more egregious homilies and transforms good sense into wisdom". Stereo Review magazine's Noel Coppage found the album to be Young's "simplest, most acoustic, and best produced" record since 1972's Harvest, but more "down to earth and direct" in comparison and highlighted by a healthier perspective to his usual angst and varied songs performed in a consistent style. While lamenting a lack of energy to some degree, Coppage said that repeat listens of the album will provide "rewarding experiences with texture and mood, some real tunes, and the real personality Young puts into his work".

Susan Toepfer of the New York Daily News noted, "The quiet ironies of love, as perceived by Young in one of his strongest, most poetic LP's...a near perfect effort. Somewhat less impressed was Greil Marcus of Rolling Stone. Describing Comes a Time as "a restrained and modest set of love songs that traces a long affair from first light to final regrets", he expressed disappointment at the relative "facelessness" of the songwriting when compared with rougher music on earlier albums like Zuma (1975) and American Stars 'n Bars (1977).

At the end of 1978, Comes a Time was voted the year's eighth best album in the Pazz & Jop, an annual poll of American critics nationwide, published in The Village Voice. Christgau, the poll's supervisor, ranked it fifth on his own year-end list accompanying the poll.

According to Rolling Stone's Milo Miles, while the album may have sounded out of place amidst the punk rock craze of 1978, it is in retrospect Young's "most timeless and easy-to-love works, a brief but immaculate" work. Miles interprets the opening track "Goin' Back" as Young returning to folk music in refuge from the real world, much as in the same way the album altogether offers listeners "a steady haven in dark times" with lyrics about "taking shelter from troubles and going out to face them again". AllMusic's William Ruhlmann recommended the album to fans of Harvest, saying "melodies, love lyrics, lush arrangements, and steel guitar solos dominated, and Young's vocals were made more accessible by being paired with Nicolette Larson's harmonies."

== Track listing ==
All songs are written by Neil Young, except "Four Strong Winds" written by Ian Tyson. Track numbering and timings are from the original vinyl release, MSK 2266. Track personnel from Neil Young Archives website.

=== Side one ===
1. "Goin' Back" (4:43)
  - Neil Young – guitar, 12-string guitar, vibes, stringman, vocal; Nicolette Larson – harmony vocal; Larrie Londin – Drums; Joe Osborn – bass; Farrell Morris – percussion; Chuck Cochran – arranger; Gone with the Wind Orchestra – strings
  - Recorded at Triiad Recording Studios, Ft. Lauderdale, 9/1977 and Woodland Studio, Nashville, 11/4/1977.
2. "Comes a Time" (3:05)
  - Neil Young – guitar, harmonica, vocal; Nicolette Larson – harmony vocal; Ben Keith – steel guitar; Karl T. Himmel – Drums; Tim Drummond – bass; Spooner Oldham – piano; Rufus Thibodeaux – fiddle; J.J. Cale – acoustic guitar; Farrell Morris – percussion; Rita Fey – autoharp; Chuck Cochran – arranger; Gone with the Wind Orchestra – acoustic guitars, strings
  - Recorded at Woodland Studio, Nashville, 11/2/1977.
3. "Look Out for My Love" (4:06)
  - Neil Young – guitar, vocal; Frank "Poncho" Sampedro – guitar; Billy Talbot – bass, vocal; Ralph Molina – drums, vocal
  - Recorded at Broken Arrow Ranch, 1/20/1976 with overdubs at CBS Studios London 4/1/1976.
4. "Lotta Love" (2:40)
  - Neil Young – guitar, vocal; Frank "Poncho" Sampedro – piano, vocal; Billy Talbot – bass, vocal; Ralph Molina – drums, vocal
  - Recorded at Wally Heider Recording Studios, Hollywood, 1/10/1976.
5. "Peace of Mind" (4:06)
  - Neil Young – guitar, piano, vibes, vocal; Nicolette Larson – harmony vocal; Ben Keith – steel guitar; Larrie Londin – Drums; Joe Osborn – bass; Farrell Morris – percussion; Rita Fey – autoharp; Chuck Cochran – arranger; Gone with the Wind Orchestra – strings
  - Recorded at Triiad Recording Studios, Ft. Lauderdale, 9/12/1977 with overdubs at Woodland Studio, Nashville, 11/1977.

=== Side two ===
1. "Human Highway" (3:09)
  - Neil Young – guitar, banjo, vocal; Nicolette Larson – harmony vocal; Ben Keith – steel guitar; Karl T. Himmel – Drums; Tim Drummond – bass
  - Recorded at Triiad Recording Studios, Ft. Lauderdale, 9/14/1977 with overdubs at Woodland Studio, Nashville, 11/1977.
2. "Already One" (4:53)
  - Neil Young – guitar, vocal; Nicolette Larson – harmony vocal; Ben Keith – steel guitar; Karl T. Himmel – Drums; Tim Drummond – bass; Spooner Oldham – piano; Rufus Thibodeaux – fiddle; Farrell Morris – percussion, vibes; J.J. Cale – acoustic guitar; Chuck Cochran – arranger; Gone with the Wind Orchestra – acoustic guitars, strings
  - Recorded at Woodland Studio, Nashville, 11/2/1977.
3. "Field of Opportunity" (3:08)
  - Neil Young – guitar, vocal; Nicolette Larson – harmony vocal; Ben Keith – steel guitar; Karl T. Himmel – Drums; Rufus Thibodeaux – fiddle; Joe Osborne – bass
  - Recorded at Crazy Mama's, Nashville, 5/3/1977 with overdubs at Woodland Studio, Nashville, 11/1977.
4. "Motorcycle Mama" (3:08)
  - Neil Young – electric guitar, vocal; Nicolette Larson – harmony vocal; Ben Keith – steel guitar; Karl T. Himmel – Drums; Tim Drummond – bass; Spooner Oldham – piano
  - Recorded at Sound Shop, Nashville, 11/21/1977.
5. "Four Strong Winds" (4:07)
  - Neil Young – guitar, banjo, vocal; Nicolette Larson – harmony vocal; Ben Keith – steel guitar; Karl T. Himmel – Drums; Tim Drummond – bass; Spooner Oldham – piano; Rufus Thibodeaux – fiddle; Rita Fey – autoharp; Farrell Morris – percussion, vibes; J.J. Cale – acoustic guitar; Chuck Cochran – arranger; Gone with the Wind Orchestra – acoustic guitars, strings
  - Recorded at Woodland Studio, Nashville, 11/2/1977.

== Personnel ==
Musicians

- Neil Young – guitar, harmonica, vocals, production
- Frank Sampedro – guitar, piano, vocals (on tracks 3 and 4)
- Billy Talbot – bass, vocals (on tracks 3 and 4)
- Ralph Molina – drums, vocals (on tracks 3 and 4)
- Nicolette Larson – harmony vocals (except on tracks 3 and 4)
- Ben Keith – steel guitar
- Karl Himmel – drums
- Tim Drummond – bass
- Spooner Oldham – piano
- Rufus Thibodeaux – fiddle
- Joe Osborn – bass
- Larrie Londin – drums
- J. J. Cale – electric guitar
- Farrell Morris – percussion
- Rita Fey – autoharp

The "Gone with the Wind Orchestra":

- Bucky Barrett, Grant Boatwright, Johnny Christopher, Jerry Shook, Vic Jordan, Steve Gibson, Dale Sellers, Ray Edenton – acoustic guitars
- Shelly Kurland, Stephanie Woolf, Marvin Chantry, Roy Christensen, Gary Vanosdale, Carl Gorodetzky, George Binkley, Steven Smith, Larry Harvin, Larry Lasson, Carol Walker, Rebecca Lynch, Virginia Christensen, Maryanna Harvin, George Kosmola, Martha McCrory, Chuck Cochran – strings

Technical

- Ben Keith – production (except on tracks 3, 4 and 8)
- Tim Mulligan – production (except on track 7)
- David Briggs – production (on tracks 3 and 4)
- Tim Mulligan, Michael Laskow, David McKinley, Danny Hilley, Mike Porter, Denny Purcell, Rich "Hoss" Adler, Ernie Winfrey, Gabby Garcia, Paul Kaminsky – engineering
- Elliot Roberts – direction
- Tom Wilkes – art direction
- Coley Coleman – photography

== Charts ==
=== Weekly charts ===
Chart performance for Comes A Time
Chart (1978)	Peak position
Australia (Kent Music Report)	6
US Billboard Top LPs & Tape	7
UK Album Charts	42
Canadian RPM 100 Albums	4
Finnish Album Charts	10
French Album Charts	2
Japanese Album Charts	65
Norwegian VG-lista Albums	9
New Zealand Album Charts	6
Dutch MegaCharts Albums	3
US Cash Box Top 100 Albums	13
US Record World Album Chart	13

=== Singles ===
Year	Single	Chart	Position
1979	"Four Strong Winds"	Billboard Pop Singles	61
1979	"Four Strong Winds"	US Cashbox Singles	69
1979	"Four Strong Winds"	US Record World Singles	67
1979	"Four Strong Winds"	Canadian RPM Top Singles	61
1979	"Four Strong Winds"	UK Singles Chart	57

Year End Chart

Year	Chart	Position
1978	Canadian Year End Chart	60
1978	Cashbox Year End Chart	71
1979	Billboard Year End Chart	56
1979	New Zealand Albums (RMNZ)	44

== Certifications ==
Region	Certification	Certified units/sales
Australia (ARIA)	2× Platinum	140,000^{^}
France (SNEP)	2× Gold	200,000^{*}
United Kingdom (BPI)	Gold	100,000^{^}
United States (RIAA)	Gold	500,000^{^}
^{*} Sales figures based on certification alone.^{^} Shipments figures based on certification alone.
