= Crime in the City (Sixty to Zero Part I) =

Song by Neil Young

from the album Freedom
- Released: October 2, 1989
- Recorded: July 29, 1988
- Studio: The Barn-Redwood Digital, Arrow Ranch, Woodside, California
- Genre: Rock
- Length: 8:45
- Label: Reprise
- Songwriter: Neil Young
- Producers: Neil Young; Niko Bolas

"Crime in the City (Sixty to Zero Part I)" is a song written by Neil Young that was first released on his 1989 album Freedom, although Young had performed longer versions in concert earlier. It was not released as a single but reached number 34 on the Billboard Magazine Mainstream Rock Tracks chart. It is a lengthy song, with a released version of almost nine minutes, but earlier versions were more than twice as long. It has been characterized as a document of moral rot in urban regions of the United States in the late 1980s.

== Lyrics and music ==
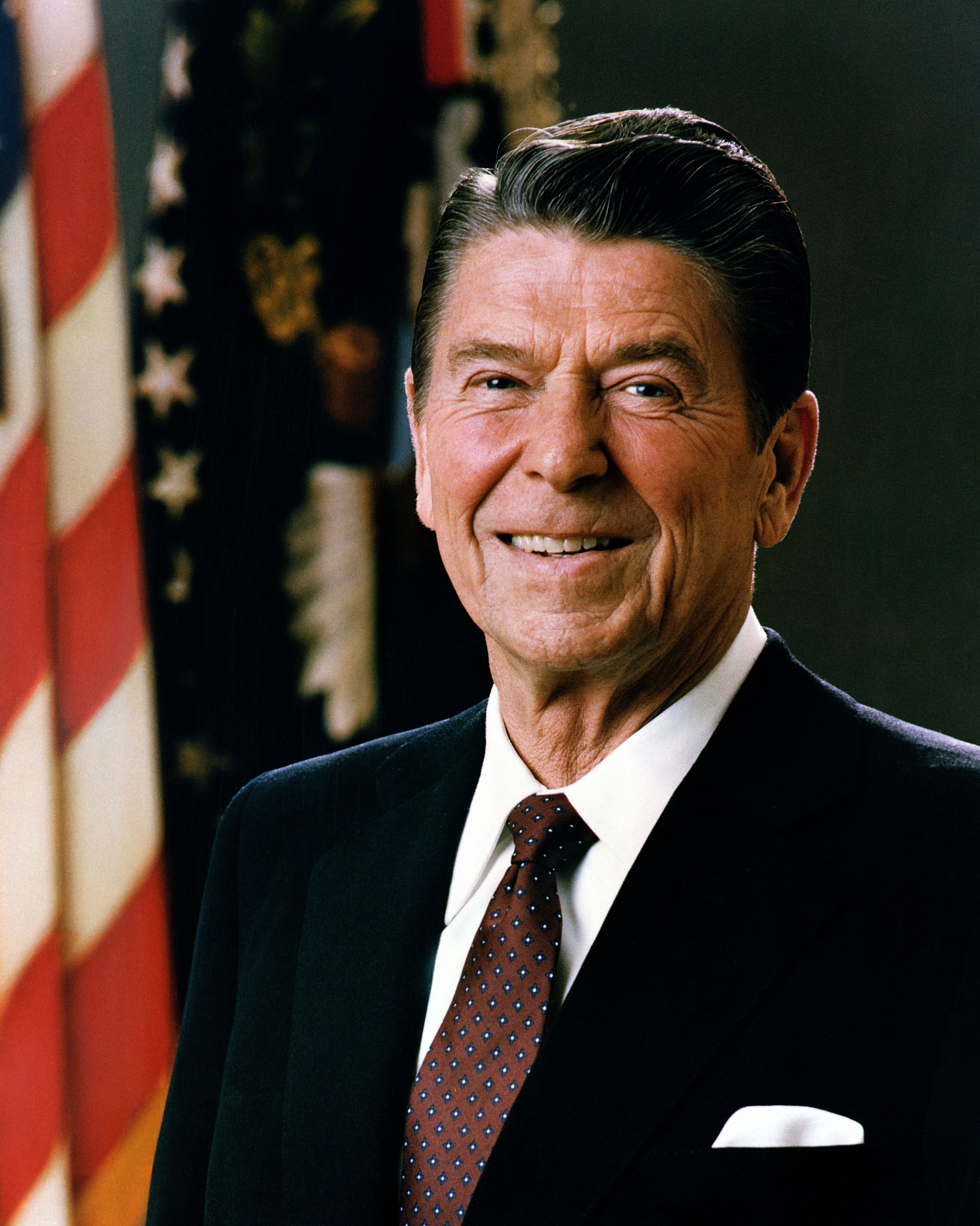
AllMusic critic Matthew Greenwald interpreted the song as a critique of America under Ronald Reagan.

"Crime in the City" was written on a sailboat in 1988 on the same day Young wrote "Ordinary People" and "Days That Used to Be." It is a lengthy song whose released version has five verses and is almost nine minutes long. Earlier versions of the song, entitled "Sixty to Zero," which Young performed in concert with the Bluenotes in 1988 were even longer, going on as long as 11 verses and 20 minutes. Young would play both acoustic and electric versions of the earlier version, though the final released version was heavily acoustic. According to David Downing the lyrics describe "selfishness, stupidity and senseless violence." Allmusic critic Matthew Greenwald interprets it as "illustrating society's lost and found in the late-Reagan administration America of the late '80s." Rolling Stone contributor Andy Greene describes it as "a frantic screed about people slowly losing their minds in a wild city." The editors of Rolling Stone described it as a companion to the bookend song on Freedom, "Rockin' in the Free World," stating that it "surveys Eighties moral rot." Music journalist Paul Williams interpreted "Crime in the City" to be a "demand that we stop ignoring and denying the reality all around us," also noting that it shares this theme with "Rockin' in the Free World."

The first verse describes a bank robbery, and also introduced themes of sensationalist media and inability to receive comfort from family. The third verse describes a cop who is driven to corruption by the violence of the criminals and the ineptitude of his superiors and who now takes bribes from 10 year olds. He ends the verse stating that "There's still crime in the city/But it's good to be free." In between, the second verse describes a cynical record producer who, dissatisfied with the song he is recording, asks his lackeys to find him a desperate, atomized songwriter, as well as a cheeseburger.

The 4th verse describes a boy dealing with his parents' divorce. Music critics Johnny Rogan and Nigel Williamson see this verse as being personal to Young, whose parents divorced in 1959. Williamson hears the raw emotion of Young's wounds from that divorce in the lines "Sometimes I talk to Daddy on the telephone/When he says that he loves me I know that he does/But I wish I could see him, I wish I knew where he was." Music lecturer Ken Bielen suggests that the boy in this verse, who admits to sometimes being good but sometimes being bad, may be the same one who bribed the cop in the prior verse, and that Young is implying that the boy's broken home is responsible for his actions.

In the 5th verse, Young sings that "I keep getting younger/My life's been funny that way," which Williamson sees as a play on the lyrics from Bob Dylan's "My Back Pages," in which Dylan sings "I was so much older then/I'm younger than that now." Rogan notes that despite that, the line "Wish I never got old" nonetheless ends the song on a "wistful note." But in between, Young described a former fireman who when growing up "sassed" authority figures such as his parents, teachers and preachers, and now is serving a life sentence in prison for an unspecified crime. Bielen suggests that as with previous verses, the fireman's predicament is the result of growing up in the city.

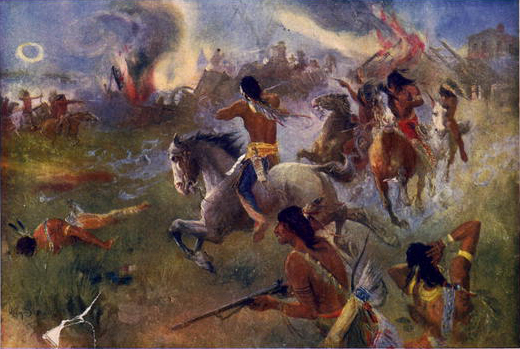
A deleted verse described the killing of the Dakota people.

Among the verses deleted from the final song were one describing the genocide of the Sioux and Dakota people and another about a prison warden and guard shooting deer in an empty prison yard.

"Crime in the City" uses a chord structure that resembles that of Dylan's "All Along the Watchtower." The song goes through multiple musical styles, including some "jazzy touches." It begins with a Spanish guitar. Steve Lawrence plays a tenor saxophone part to take the song from the verse about the record producer to the verse about the corrupt cop. Bielen describes this sax part as being like the soundtrack of a film noir. Bielen describes the horn part as being "spare," stating that it adds an "ominous character" to the song.

== Reception ==
In a 2016 Rolling Stone readers poll, "Crime in the City" ranked as Young's 6th-best post-1970s song. In 2014, the editors of Rolling Stone ranked "Crime in the City" as Neil Young's 82nd greatest song of all time. It reached number 34 on the Billboard Magazine Mainstream Rock Tracks chart.

Greenwald described it as the "centerpiece" of Freedom and one of Young's "most accomplished works." Rolling Stone critic David Fricke described it as "a chilling litany of cynicism and resignation set to a skeletal, almost jazzy gallop and laced with Ben Keith’s icy steel guitar and the earthy mooing of the Bluenotes’ brass." Musician Hawksley Workman identified "Crime in the City" as the Neil Young song which influenced him the most, particularly the 2nd verse with its "almost somewhat untoward depiction of a scene in the studio with drugs and booze and cigarettes." Workman recalled listening to the song as a youngster wanting to enter the music business and thinking "this feels dirty, and I like it, you know?"

Downing feels the original longer version had more "drive" than the officially released version. Neil Young's biographer Jimmy McDonough similarly felt that the song worked best in its electric version, which was played faster, and that the final released version omitted some of the song's best verses.

== Live versions ==
A live version of "Crime in the City" was released on the 1991 live album Weld. As of 2025 Young has not played the song live in concert since 2003.

Both electric and acoustic versions of the original "Sixty to Zero" are available on bootleg CDs. A seven-minute electric version from a 1988 Jones Beach concert was included on Bluenote Café, released as part of the Neil Young Archives series in 2015. Pitchfork contributor Tyler Wilcox called this performance "angry and invigorating as Young got in the 1980s." McDonough felt that the electric Jones Beach performance was the most intense performance of the song he had heard.

== Personnel ==
- Neil Young – guitar, vocals
- Chad Cromwell – drums
- Rick Rosas – bass
- Frank Sampedro – guitar
- Steve Lawrence – tenor saxophone
- Larry Cragg – baritone saxophone
- Claude Cailliet – trombone
- John Fumo – trumpet
- Tom Bray – trumpet
- Ben Keith – alto saxophone, pedal steel guitar
