= Chrome Dreams II =

Studio album by Neil Young
- Released: October 23, 2007
- Recorded: May 31 – July 6, 2007 (Note: except "Ordinary People" – July 26, 1988)
- Studio: Broken Arrow Ranch
- Genre: Heartland rock; country rock; Americana; hard rock
- Length: 65:53
- Label: Reprise
- Producer: Neil Young; Niko Bolas (credited as "The Volume Dealers")

Neil Young chronology
Live at Massey Hall 1971 (2007)	Chrome Dreams II (2007)	Sugar Mountain – Live at Canterbury House 1968 (2008)

Professional ratings
Aggregate scores
Source	Rating
Metacritic	76/100
Review scores
Source	Rating
AllMusic	4/5 stars
The Guardian	3/5 stars
The Independent	2/5 stars
NME	7/10
The Observer	5/5 stars
Pitchfork	5.6/10
Rolling Stone	3/5 stars
Spin	7/10
The Times	3/5 stars
Uncut	4/5 stars

Chrome Dreams II is the thirtieth studio album by Canadian-American musician Neil Young. The album was released on October 23, 2007, as a double LP and as a single CD. The album name references Chrome Dreams, a legendary Neil Young album from 1977 that had originally been scheduled for release but was shelved in favor of American Stars 'n Bars.

The album debuted on the US Billboard 200 chart at number 11, selling about 54,000 copies in its first week. In addition, the song "No Hidden Path" was nominated for a Grammy Award for Best Solo Rock Vocal Performance at the 51st Grammy Awards, 2009.

== Writing ==
The album features a mix of different types of songs featuring different musical styles and lengths. According to Young,

It's an album with a form based on some of my original recordings, with a large variety of songs, rather than one specific type of song. Where Living with War and Everybody's Rockin' were albums focused on one subject or style, Chrome Dreams II is more like After the Gold Rush or Freedom, with different types of songs working together to form a feeling. Now that radio formats are not as influential as they once were, it's easier to release an album that crosses all formats with a message that runs through the whole thing, regardless of the type of song or sound. Some early listeners have said that this album is positive and spiritual. I like to think it focuses on the human condition. Like many of my recordings, this one draws on earlier material here and there. I used to do that a lot back in the day. Some songs, like "Ordinary People" need to wait for the right time. I think now is the right time for that song and it lives well with the new songs I have written in the past few months. I had a blast making this music.

The first three songs on Chrome Dreams II date from the 1980s. "Beautiful Bluebird" was first recorded in 1985 during sessions for Old Ways. "Boxcar" had been previously recorded for Freedom and Ragged Glory, but was ultimately left off both albums. Both songs appear on Chrome Dreams II as new recordings.

The 18-minute "Ordinary People" was recorded in July 1988 during initial sessions for the Freedom album. It features the backing musicians from Young's Bluenotes tour. The song was released as the album's first single.

According to a 2020 post on his Neil Young Archives website, the lyrics to "Dirty Old Man" explore "the ugliest parts of alcoholism. I really loathe what it does to people."

The epic "No Hidden Path" was inspired by long walks on Young's ranch. He explains in a 2019 post to his website that it's "about the forest on Broken Arrow where I used to walk regularly." The song features as the centerpiece of the 2009 Jonathan Demme film Neil Young Trunk Show.

== Recording ==
Chrome Dreams II was produced by The Volume Dealers (Neil Young & Niko Bolas), and features the ensemble of Crazy Horse drummer Ralph Molina, pedal steel guitarist and Dobro player Ben Keith (Harvest, Comes A Time, Harvest Moon) and bassist Rick Rosas (Freedom, Living With War, This Note's for You). A horn section, The Blue Note Horns, appear on one track, "Ordinary People," while the Young People’s Chorus of New York City appear on "The Way." Most of the recording was done live with few overdubs at Feelgood's Garage studio near Redwood City, California, with two vintage gas pumps out front and vintage studio gear inside.

== Track listing ==
No.	Title	Length
1.	"Beautiful Bluebird"	4:27
2.	"Boxcar"	2:44
3.	"Ordinary People"	18:13
4.	"Shining Light"	4:43
5.	"The Believer"	2:39
6.	"Spirit Road"	6:32
7.	"Dirty Old Man"	3:17
8.	"Ever After"	3:32
9.	"No Hidden Path"	14:31
10.	"The Way"	5:15

== Personnel ==
Primary musicians

- Neil Young – acoustic and electric guitars, banjo, harmonica, grand piano, pump organ, Hammond B-3 organ, vibes, percussion, vocals
- Ben Keith – pedal steel guitar, lap slide guitar, Dobro, electric guitar, Hammond B-3 organ, vocal
- Rick Rosas – bass guitar, vocal
- Ralph Molina – drums, percussion, vocal

Musicians for "Ordinary People"

- Neil Young – electric guitar, vocal
- Joe Canuck – vocal
- Frank "Poncho" Sampedro – guitar
- Rick Rosas – bass guitar
- Chad Cromwell – drums
- Ben Keith – alto saxophone
- Steve Lawrence – tenor saxophone, keyboards
- Larry Cragg – baritone saxophone
- Claude Cailliet – trombone
- John Fumo – trumpet
- Tom Bray – trumpet (solo)

Background singers

- The Wyatt Earps – Ben Keith, Ralph Molina, Neil Young
- The Jane Wyatts – Nancy Hall, Annie Stocking, Pegi Young
- The Dirty Old Men – Larry Cragg, Ben Keith, Ralph Molina, Rick Rosas, Neil Young
- The Young People’s Chorus of New York City (chorus on "The Way")
  - Francisco J. Núñez – artistic director and founder
  - Elizabeth Núñez – conductor

Additional roles

- Niko Bolas – recording, mixing
- John Hausmann – assistant engineering
- Rob Clark – assistant engineering, editing
- John Nowland – analog-digital transfers
- Tim Mulligan – mastering, editing on "Ordinary People"
- Brent Walton, Tim McColm – assistant engineering
- Colin Suzuki, Eric Pfeifer – assistant engineering on "The Way"
- Darrell Brown, Neil Young – choir arrangements on "The Way"
- Elliot Roberts – direction

DVD production

- Bernard Shakey (Neil Young) – direction
- L.A. Johnson – production, pohotography
- Elliot Rabinowitz – executive production
- Will Mitchell – associate production, photography
- Toshi Onuki – editing, art direction
- Mike Derrosset – editing
- Rich Winter – authoring, menu design
- Larry Cragg, Anthony Crawford – photography

== Charts ==
Chart performance for Chrome Dreams II
Chart (2007)	Peak position
Australian Albums (ARIA)	38
Austrian Albums (Ö3 Austria)	27
Belgian Albums (Ultratop Flanders)	16
Belgian Albums (Ultratop Wallonia)	40
Canadian Albums (Billboard)	8
Danish Albums (Hitlisten)	20
Dutch Albums (Album Top 100)	14
Finnish Albums (Suomen virallinen lista)	32
French Albums (SNEP)	9
German Albums (Offizielle Top 100)	13
Irish Albums (IRMA)	15
Italian Albums (FIMI)	28
Norwegian Albums (VG-lista)	5
Spanish Albums (Promusicae)	80
Swedish Albums (Sverigetopplistan)	13
Swiss Albums (Schweizer Hitparade)	72
UK Albums (OCC)	14
US Billboard 200	11
US Top Rock Albums (Billboard)	6
US Indie Store Album Sales (Billboard)	3

== See also ==
- Chrome Dreams
