= Weld (album) =

Live album by Neil Young and Crazy Horse
- Released: October 22, 1991
- Recorded: February – April, 1991
- Venue: Various
- Genre: Hard rock
- Length: 121:49
- Label: Reprise
- Producers: Neil Young; David Briggs; Billy Talbot

Neil Young and Crazy Horse chronology
Ragged Glory (1990)	Weld (1991)	Arc (1991)

Professional ratings
Review scores
Source	Rating
AllMusic	4.5/5 stars
Christgau’s Consumer Guide	A−
Entertainment Weekly	B−
NME	10/10
Tom Hull – on the Web	A−

Weld is a live album by Neil Young and Crazy Horse released in 1991, comprising performances recorded on the tour to promote the Ragged Glory album. It was initially released as a limited edition three-disc set entitled Arc-Weld, with the Arc portion being a single disc consisting in its entirety of a sound collage of guitar noise and feedback. Arc has since been released separately.

Weld consists of rock and roll songs by Young and Crazy Horse, duplicating seven that had appeared on either Rust Never Sleeps or Live Rust from twelve years earlier. It also echoes those albums as Young, in both cases having spent most of a previous decade pursuing different musical avenues, returned to straightforward rock and roll via the Ragged Glory album with Crazy Horse, then celebrated that return with an accompanying live document and concert film.

The album includes Young's "Gulf War" version of Bob Dylan's "Blowin' in the Wind", which has air raid sound effects. The tour coincided with the Gulf War, which had an impact on how the band played the songs, and influenced Young to make changes to the setlists, adding the violence themed songs "Cortez the Killer" and "Powderfinger". Young explains in a November 1991 interview with David Fricke for Rolling Stone:

"We were there all the way through it, and to me, that's what Weld is about. It's very brutal, especially the songs with the big endings. I was trying to create the sound of violence and conflict, heavy machinery, outright destruction. We were watching CNN all the time, watching this shit happen, and then going out to play, singing these songs about conflict. It was a hard thing. And I feel there was nothing else I could do. Whatever could bring people together was more important than me playing a new song. We couldn't go out there and just be entertainment."

Weld was recorded by David Hewitt on Remote Recording Services' Silver Truck.

Young has stated that he permanently damaged his hearing while mixing this album.

There was a brief release of the concert on VHS and Laserdisc. The mix on the video is by longtime Young collaborator David Briggs and is a harder-edged, superior mix, according to biographer Jimmy McDonough in his book Shakey. The video was re-released in May 2009 for digital download.

== Track listing ==
All tracks written by Neil Young except where noted.

Disc one
No.	Title	Writer(s)	Original album	Length
1.	"Hey Hey, My My (Into the Black)"		Rust Never Sleeps (1979)	5:42
2.	"Crime in the City"		Freedom (1989)	6:34
3.	"Blowin' in the Wind"	Bob Dylan		6:48
4.	"Welfare Mothers"		Rust Never Sleeps (1979)	7:05
5.	"Love to Burn"		Ragged Glory (1990)	9:58
6.	"Cinnamon Girl"		Everybody Knows This Is Nowhere (1969)	4:48
7.	"Mansion on the Hill"		Ragged Glory (1990)	6:14
8.	"F*!#in' Up"		Ragged Glory (1990)	7:10

Disc two
No.	Title	Writer(s)	Original album	Length
1.	"Cortez the Killer"		Zuma (1975)	9:47
2.	"Powderfinger"		Rust Never Sleeps (1979)	5:56
3.	"Love and Only Love"		Ragged Glory (1990)	9:19
4.	"Rockin' in the Free World"		Freedom (1989)	9:23
5.	"Like a Hurricane"		American Stars 'n Bars (1977)	14:01
6.	"Farmer John"	Don Harris, Dewey Terry	Ragged Glory (1990)	5:00
7.	"Tonight's the Night"		Tonight's the Night (1975)	8:43
8.	"Roll Another Number"		Tonight's the Night (1975)	5:22

=== 1991 vinyl edition ===
Side one
No.	Title	Writer(s)	Length
1.	"Hey Hey, My My (Into the Black)"		5:21
2.	"Crime in the City"		6:26
3.	"Blowin' in the Wind"	Bob Dylan	6:36
4.	"Love to Burn"		9:37

Side two
No.	Title	Writer(s)	Length
5.	"Welfare Mothers"		6:51
6.	"Cinnamon Girl"		4:33
7.	"Mansion on the Hill"		6:04
8.	"F*!#in' Up"		6:53
9.	"Farmer John"	Don Harris, Dewey Terry	4:13

Side three
No.	Title	Length
1.	"Cortez the Killer"	9:26
2.	"Powderfinger"	5:36
3.	"Love and Only Love"	9:17
4.	"Roll Another Number"	4:58

Side four
No.	Title	Length
5.	"Rockin' in the Free World"	8:33
6.	"Like a Hurricane"	13:56
7.	"Tonight's the Night"	8:12

The 2023 vinyl reissue restores the track order from the CD version, but splits the album over three discs.

== Personnel ==
- Neil Young – guitar, vocals, production, mixing

Crazy Horse

- Ralph Molina – drums, vocals
- Frank "Poncho" Sampedro – guitar, Univox Stringman synthesizer, vocals
- Billy Talbot – bass, vocals, production, mixing (1–3, 5–8, 10–16)

Additional roles

- David Briggs – production, mixing (2, 4–5, 8–9)
- Joel Bernstein, Larry Cragg – photography
- Janet Levinson – art direction
- Tim Mulligan – mixing, editing, mastering
- John Nowland – mixing (1–3, 5–8, 10–16)
- John Hanlon – mixing (4, 9)
- Dave Hewitt – recording
- Phil Gitomer, Dave Roberts, Brian Leskowicz – assistant engineering
- Elliot Roberts – direction

== Charts ==
Chart performance for Weld
Chart (1991)	Peak position
Australian Albums (ARIA)	90
Canada Top Albums/CDs (RPM)	58
Dutch Albums (Album Top 100)	46
Finnish Albums (Suomen virallinen lista)	27
Norwegian Albums (VG-lista)	12
Swedish Albums (Sverigetopplistan)	33
UK Albums (Official Charts)	20
US Billboard 200	154

== Certifications ==
Organization	Level	Date
BPI – UK	Silver	November 1, 2002
