= Sleeps with Angels =

Studio album by Neil Young & Crazy Horse
- Released: August 16, 1994
- Recorded: November 8, 1993 – April 25, 1994
- Studios: The Complex Studios, West Los Angeles, California
- Genre: Rock
- Length: 62:06
- Labels: Reprise; Warner Bros.
- Producers: David Briggs; Neil Young

Neil Young chronology
Unplugged (1993)	Sleeps with Angels (1994)	Mirror Ball (1995)

Crazy Horse chronology
Arc (1991)	Sleeps with Angels (1994)	Broken Arrow (1996)

Singles from Sleeps with Angels
- 1. "Change Your Mind" Released: 1994; 2. "Piece of Crap" Released: 1994

Professional ratings
Review scores
Source	Rating
AllMusic	3.5/5 stars
Robert Christgau	A−
Encyclopedia of Popular Music	4/5 stars
The Music Box	4/5 stars
New Musical Express	9/10
Select	5/5 medals

Sleeps with Angels is the twenty-second studio album by Canadian-American musician Neil Young, released on August 16, 1994, on Reprise as a double LP and as a single CD. Young's seventh album with Crazy Horse, it was co-produced by long-time collaborator David Briggs who died the following year. The title track was written in response to Kurt Cobain's suicide. Musician and author Ken Viola described the album as one of Young's "top five records. It examines the nature of dreams — both the light and dark side — and how they fuel reality in the nineties. Dreams are the only thing that we've got left to hang on to."

== Background ==
The early 1990s were something of a comeback and second career pinnacle for Young with the release of 1989's Freedom, 1990's Ragged Glory and 1992's Harvest Moon. Young was dubbed the "Godfather of Grunge" by one music critic and performed "Rockin' in the Free World" with Pearl Jam at the 1993 MTV Video Music Awards. Young also performed with Booker T. & the M.G.'s at Bob Dylan's The 30th Anniversary Concert Celebration and embarked on a North American tour with the group. In the winter of 1993-1994, he reunited with Crazy Horse to record a new album at The Complex in Los Angeles.

== Writing and recording ==
In contrast to his other albums, Young has been loath to discuss the album's content and the inspiration for its songs in interviews. In 1995 he told Mojo Magazine's Nick Kent: "Sleeps With Angels has a lot of overtones to it, from different situations that were described in it – a lot of sad scenes. I've never really spoken about why I made that album. I don't want to start now. I just don't want to talk about that. That's my decision. I've made a choice not to talk about it and I'm sticking to it." He repeated his stance in a later 1995 interview for Spin Magazine: "I'm not doing anything with that album. It stands on its own. That's why I made the record. Too sensitive of a subject to isolate comments on. When you speak to someone who can write things down, you have to remember that they only write what they select. And it appears next to something that they can't control, like an ad. And then that article can be quoted, and over time...I've seen the way things happen."

The lengthy "Change Your Mind" was debuted during the 1993 tour with Booker T. & the M.G.'s. The other songs on the album were written during the recording sessions. The album features a variety of unique instruments, including bass marimbas, vibes, synthesizers and a tack piano on "My Heart" and "A Dream That Can Last". "Prime of Life" and "Safeway Cart" feature Young playing flute; Sleeps with Angels is the only Neil Young album on which he plays that instrument. The songs "Western Hero" and "Train of Love" feature the same music with different lyrics, "like identical twins. The same song with two completely different stories. But it brings you back to this theme. It's almost like a Broadway play." "Safeway Cart" is featured on the soundtrack during a marching sequence in Claire Denis's 1999 film Beau Travail.

The title track was inspired by the death of Kurt Cobain, who quoted Young in his suicide note, with the rest of the album having been recorded before that event. "When he died and left that note, it struck a deep chord inside of me. It fucked with me. I wrote some music for that feeling: "Sleeps with Angels"," Young remembers in his memoir, Waging Heavy Peace. He continues in Shakey: "What that suicide has done is return me to my roots. Makes me go back and investigate where I started. Where I came from. Why am I here and why is he not here? Does my music suffer because I survived?" Young wrote the first lyrics to the song on a matchbook during a charity golf tournament hosted by Eddie Van Halen.

== Promotion ==
A thirty-minute documentary was filmed by L.A. Johnson during the album's sessions. Promotional videos were later shot for the songs "My Heart," "Prime of Life," "Change Your Mind," and "Piece of Crap" by director Jonathan Demme. The videos feature the group returning to The Complex on October 3–4, 1994 to perform the songs live.

The group performed three concerts in October 1994 featuring songs from the album, all charity events. On October 1–2, the group played acoustic sets at the annual Bridge School Benefit concerts featuring seven of the album's songs. On October 22, the group played a similar setlist in Sedona, Arizona at the Verde Valley scholarship benefit festival.

== Critical reception ==
Sleeps with Angels was met with widespread critical acclaim upon its release. Writing in Rolling Stone, David Fricke awarded the album five stars and described it as an "extraordinary" record, noting that despite the grief-laden atmosphere surrounding the title track, the album as a whole was charged with fighting spirit and romantic optimism alongside its war-zone tensions and deathbed fears. Fricke singled out the epic "Change Your Mind" and "Driveby" as standout tracks, and praised the album's range of emotions and instrumentation.

Robert Christgau of The Village Voice awarded the album an A−, writing that Young had produced one of his most focused and emotionally resonant works of the decade.

New Musical Express gave the album 9 out of 10, with reviewer Gavin Martin writing that the album had a new and distinctive tone — mournful, almost religious — that set it apart from anything Young had previously released. Martin observed that Sleeps with Angels would remind listeners of earlier Young classics while simultaneously sounding like no Neil Young album they had ever heard, and called "Change Your Mind" a centrepiece of genuine mastery.

Select magazine awarded the album four stars, praising its emotional range and calling it a worthy addition to Young's catalogue of grief-driven masterworks.

== Track listing ==
All tracks were written by Neil Young, except "Blue Eden", written by Young, Ralph Molina, Frank Sampedro and Billy Talbot.

No.	Title	Length
1.	"My Heart"	2:44
2.	"Prime of Life"	4:02
3.	"Driveby"	4:43
4.	"Sleeps with Angels"	2:44
5.	"Western Hero"	4:00
6.	"Change Your Mind"	14:39
7.	"Blue Eden"	6:22
8.	"Safeway Cart"	6:29
9.	"Train of Love"	3:57
10.	"Trans Am"	4:07
11.	"Piece of Crap"	3:15
12.	"A Dream That Can Last"	5:27
Total length:		62:06

== Personnel ==
- Neil Young – guitar on all tracks except 1 and 12, tack piano on tracks 1 and 12, accordion on track 5, flute on tracks 2 and 8, harmonica on track 8 and 12, vocals

Crazy Horse

- Frank "Poncho" Sampedro – guitar on tracks 2, 4, 6, 7, 10, and 11, grand piano on tracks 5 and 9, piano on tracks 3 and 12, bass marimba on track 1, Oberheim on tracks 3 and 8, Wurlitzer piano on track 8, vocals
- Billy Talbot – bass on all tracks except 1 and 12, vibes on track 1, bass marimba on track 12, vocals
- Ralph Molina – drums, vocals

Recording personnel

- David Briggs – producer, mixing
- Neil Young – producer, mixing
- John Hanlon – engineer, mixing
- Chad Blinman – assistant engineer
- Roland Alvarez – assistant engineer
- Joe Gastwirt – digital editing, mastering
- Tim Mulligan – additional digital editing
- Tim Foster – production manager
- Bettina Briggs – production coordinator
- Sal Trentino – amplifier tech
- Jim Homan – guitar tech
- Jerry Conforti – drum tech
- Mark Humphreys – live monitors

== Charts ==
=== Album ===
Chart (1994)	Peak position
Australian Albums (ARIA)	23
Austrian Albums (Ö3 Austria)	12
Canada Top Albums/CDs (RPM)	7
Dutch Albums (Album Top 100)	10
Finnish Albums (Suomen virallinen lista)	2
German Albums (Offizielle Top 100)	11
New Zealand Albums (RMNZ)	17
Norwegian Albums (VG-lista)	4
Swedish Albums (Sverigetopplistan)	2
Swiss Albums (Schweizer Hitparade)	13
UK Albums (Official Charts)	2
US Billboard 200	9

=== Singles ===
Year	Single	Chart	Position
1994	"Change Your Mind"	US Mainstream Rock Tracks	18
1994	"Piece Of Crap"	UK Singles (Official Charts)	91

== Certifications ==
Region	Certification	Certified units/sales
United Kingdom (BPI)	Gold	100,000^{^}
United States (RIAA)	Gold	500,000^{^}
^{^} Shipments figures based on certification alone.
