= Bluenote Café =

Live album by Neil Young
- Released: November 13, 2015
- Recorded: November 1987 – August 1988
- Venue: Various
- Genres: Blues rock; jump blues; heartland rock
- Length: 146:24
- Label: Reprise
- Producers: Neil Young; Niko Bolas (credited as "The Volume Dealers")

Neil Young chronology
| The Monsanto Years (2015) | Bluenote Café (2015) | Earth (2016) |

Archives Performance Series chronology
| PS09: A Treasure (2011) | PS11: Bluenote Café (2015) | PS11.5: Way Down in the Rust Bucket (2021) |

Bluenote Café is a live album by Canadian / American singer-songwriter Neil Young, released on November 13, 2015, on Reprise. The album is volume eleven in Young's Archives Performance Series, and features performances from Young's 1987–88 American tours with the Bluenotes, with whom he recorded his seventeenth studio album, This Note's for You. The album cover art is a photograph of the frontage and marquee of the old Blue Note Café on Main Street in Winnipeg, where Neil grew up.

Aside from live versions of This Note's for You songs, the album features a number of songs that were not released at the time; "Welcome to the Big Room", "Bad News Comes to Town", "Crime of the Heart" and "Doghouse" make their first appearances on any official Neil Young release ("Doghouse" was covered in 2011 by Young's then-wife Pegi on her album Bracing for Impact). Two of the album's tracks, "This Note's for You" and "Ain't It the Truth," previously appeared on the compilation album Lucky Thirteen.

Several of the songs from the tour and album were written as a teenager while Young was a member of The Squires. Young recalls writing these Jimmy Reed influenced songs in his memoir, Waging Heavy Peace:

"The Flamingo (Club in Fort William, Ontario) eventually put us (The Squires) up at the Victoria Hotel, and I was writing a lot of songs for the gig there. We were going Jimmy Reed–style big-time because I loved Jimmy and knew that kind of music would be perfect for the club. I wrote a couple of R&B songs in that vein right away, "Find Another Shoulder" and "Hello Lonely Woman," at the hotel. I wrote a lot more then, too. One older song that was the same type of beat was resurrected. It was called "Ain’t It the Truth." These tunes were all R&B-based and we did a good job on them.

Young initially compiled a double live album from the This Note's for You tour shortly after the tour's conclusion, as a showcase for the unreleased songs performed during the shows. The album was ultimately shelved in favor of a CSNY reunion album and 1989's Freedom.

The release of Bluenote Café is seen as a tribute to bassist Rick Rosas, who died in the year prior to the release.

== Critical reception ==
Professional ratings
Aggregate scores
| Source | Rating |
|---|---|
| Metacritic | 75/100 |
Review scores
| Source | Rating |
| AllMusic | 3.5/5 stars |
| American Songwriter | 4.5/5 stars |
| Classic Rock Magazine | 2.5/5 stars |
| Exclaim! | 4/10 |
| The Independent | 3/5 stars |
| The Irish Times | 4/5 stars |
| PopMatters | 9/10 stars |
| Rolling Stone | 3/5 stars |

The album received positive reviews and holds a score of 75 out of 100 on Metacritic, indicating "generally favourable reviews". Chris Gerard of PopMatters gave the album nine stars out of ten, stating: "Bluenote Café is essential Neil Young, further evidence that Young's 80s work has more value than many would expect or admit." Conversely, in a brief negative review, Daniel Sylvester of Exclaim! wrote that "even die-hard fans will find this as nothing more than a masochistic curiosity." In a three-star review, Will Hermes of Rolling Stone said that "[these] live recordings from the late Eighties illuminate and (partly) redeem one of Neil Young's stranger eras". In a highly positive four-and-a-half-star review, Hal Horowitz of American Songwriter wrote that "even diehard Neil Young fans may not fully appreciate this offshoot in his bulging catalog. But this remarkably vibrant and immediate live compilation shows that Young took this side road very seriously and that it was more than just a forgettable, momentary quirk in his diverse and winding career."

== Track listing ==
Disc one
| No. | Title | Length |
|---|---|---|
| 1. | "Welcome to the Big Room" (Mountain View, California – 1987-11-07) | 7:31 |
| 2. | "Don't Take Your Love Away From Me" (The Fillmore, San Francisco, California – 1987-11-12) | 9:30 |
| 3. | "This Note's for You" (The Palace, Hollywood, CA – 1988-04-13) | 5:24 |
| 4. | "Ten Men Workin" (The World, New York City, New York – 1988-04-18) | 8:27 |
| 5. | "Life in the City" (The World, New York City, New York – 1988-04-18) | 3:55 |
| 6. | "Hello Lonely Woman" (The World, New York City, New York – 1988-04-18) | 4:46 |
| 7. | "Soul of a Woman" (The World, New York City, New York – 1988-04-18) | 5:57 |
| 8. | "Married Man" (The World, New York City, New York – 1988-04-21) | 3:07 |
| 9. | "Bad News Comes to Town" (Agora Ballroom, Cleveland, Ohio – 1988-04-23) | 8:00 |
| 10. | "Ain't It the Truth" (Agora Ballroom, Cleveland, Ohio – 1988-04-23) | 7:30 |
| 11. | "One Thing" (Agora Ballroom, Cleveland, Ohio – 1988-04-23) | 6:41 |
| 12. | "Twilight" (Agora Ballroom, Cleveland, Ohio – 1988-04-23) | 8:03 |

Disc two
| No. | Title | Length |
|---|---|---|
| 1. | "I'm Goin" (CNE, Toronto, Ontario, Canada – 1988-08-18) | 5:35 |
| 2. | "Ordinary People" (Lake Compounce, Bristol, Connecticut – 1988-08-23) | 12:50 |
| 3. | "Crime in the City" (Jones Beach, Wantagh, New York – 1988-08-27) | 7:22 |
| 4. | "Crime of the Heart" (Pier 84, New York City, New York – 1988-08-30) | 5:36 |
| 5. | "Welcome Rap" (Pier 84, New York City, New York – 1988-08-30) | 0:36 |
| 6. | "Doghouse" (Pier 84, New York City, New York – 1988-08-30) | 4:08 |
| 7. | "Fool for Your Love" (Pier 84, New York City, New York – 1988-08-30) | 4:20 |
| 8. | "Encore Rap" (Pier 84, New York City, New York – 1988-08-30) | 0:25 |
| 9. | "On the Way Home" (Poplar Creek Music Theatre, Hoffman Estates, Illinois – 1988-08-16) | 3:01 |
| 10. | "Sunny Inside" (Pier 84, New York City, New York – 1988-08-30) | 3:44 |
| 11. | "Tonight's the Night" (Pier 84, New York City, New York – 1988-08-30) | 19:26 |

== Personnel ==
- Neil Young – vocal, guitar, harmonica
- Tom Bray, John Fumo – trumpets
- Claude Cailliet – trombone, backing vocal
- Ben Keith – alto saxophone
- Steve Lawrence – lead tenor saxophone, keyboards, backing vocal
- Larry Cragg – baritone saxophone
- Frank Sampedro – keyboards, guitar, backing vocal
- Rick Rosas – bass (except disc one tracks 1–2)
- Chad Cromwell – drums (except disc one tracks 1–2)
- Billy Talbot – bass (disc one tracks 1–2 only)
- Ralph Molina – drums (disc one tracks 1–2 only)

Additional roles

- Niko Bolas – production
- Gary Burden, Jenice Heo – art direction & design
- Aaron Rapoport, Jack Harper, Henry Diltz – photography

== Charts ==
| Chart (2015) | Peak position |
|---|---|
| Austrian Albums (Ö3 Austria) | 23 |
| Belgian Albums (Ultratop Flanders) | 17 |
| Belgian Albums (Ultratop Wallonia) | 54 |
| Dutch Albums (MegaCharts) | 21 |
| Finnish Albums (Suomen virallinen lista) | 35 |
| French Albums (SNEP) | 84 |
| German Albums (Offizielle Top 100) | 16 |
| Irish Albums (IRMA) | 39 |
| Italian Albums (FIMI) | 55 |
| Norwegian Albums (VG-lista) | 24 |
| Spanish Albums (PROMUSICAE) | 86 |
| Swedish Albums (Sverigetopplistan) | 55 |
| Swiss Albums (Schweizer Hitparade) | 52 |
| UK Albums (Official Charts) | 39 |
| US Billboard 200 | 89 |
| US Top Rock Albums (Billboard) | 8 |
| US Americana/Folk Albums (Billboard) | 1 |
| US Indie Store Album Sales (Billboard) | 2 |
