= Wrecking Ball (Neil Young song) =

Song by Neil Young

from the album Freedom
- Released: October 2, 1989
- Recorded: December 13, 1988
- Studio: The Hit Factory, New York City; Broken Arrow Ranch
- Genre: Soft rock; heartland rock
- Length: 5:08
- Label: Reprise
- Songwriter: Neil Young
- Producers: Neil Young; Niko Bolas

"Wrecking Ball" is a 1989 song by Neil Young, included in the album Freedom. The song was covered by American singer Emmylou Harris in 1995.

== Composition ==
The song was written by Neil Young. Rather than referring to a real demolition wrecking ball, the lyrics are wordplay and the song refers to a dance or ball. Aside from the 1989 album version, "Wrecking Ball" exists also in a different version with a separate set of lyrics.

Young sang harmony on the Emmylou Harris version, which became the title track of the Grammy Award-winning album Wrecking Ball. Although the song was released by Harris as a 2-track CD single with Lucinda Williams' "Sweet Old World", one reviewer did not consider the title track the high point on the album.

== Personnel ==
- Neil Young – piano, vocals
- Chad Cromwell – drums
- Rick Rosas – bass
