= NOMAS =

NOMAS may refer to:

- National Organization for Men Against Sexism, an American anti-sexism organization since the 1970s
- Not Manufacturer Supported, a term for undocumented or unsupported features of a product coined by PPC Journal in the early 1980s

== See also ==
- No más (disambiguation)
