= Neil Young Journeys =

- Directed by: Jonathan Demme
- Produced by: Jonathan Demme; Elliot Rabinowitz
- Starring: Neil Young
- Cinematography: Declan Quinn
- Edited by: Glenn Allen
- Music by: Neil Young
- Production companies: Shakey Pictures; Clinica Estetico
- Distributed by: Sony Pictures Classics
- Release dates: September 12, 2011 (TIFF); June 29, 2012
- Running time: 87 minutes
- Country: United States
- Language: English
- Box office: $215,026

Neil Young Journeys is a 2011 American concert documentary film produced and directed by Jonathan Demme, featuring Neil Young and produced for Sony Pictures Classics. It is, along with Neil Young: Heart of Gold (2006) and Neil Young Trunk Show (2009), part of a Neil Young trilogy directed by Demme.

== Content ==
The film has Young visiting his childhood home of Omemee, Ontario, with his brother where he arrives at his old haunts and tells stories of the people from his past. In addition, he passes by Scott Young Public School, which was named in honor of his father, Scott Young.

Another major portion of the film is Young performing a concert at Massey Hall in Toronto, which features primarily his newer compositions. However, there are five classic songs with "Ohio" being the most prominent with archival footage of the Kent State Shootings in 1970 with photographs of the four students who were killed in the incident being displayed.

== Songs in the film ==
All songs are written by Young, except where otherwise noted.

- "Peaceful Valley Boulevard"
- "Ohio"
- "Down by the River"
- "Sign Of Love"
- "Rumbling"
- "Love And War"
- "Leia"
- "After the Gold Rush"
- "I Believe In You"
- "My My, Hey Hey (Out of the Blue)" - written by Neil Young and Jeff Blackburn
- "You Never Call"
- "Hitchhiker"
- "Walk With Me"
- "Helpless" - played over the credits

== Reception ==
Neil Young Journeys has a 93% "fresh" rating on Rotten Tomatoes on 42 reviews with an average rating of 7.1/10. The film holds a 74/100 rating, indicating "generally favorable reviews".

== See also ==
- Scott Young
- Crosby, Stills, Nash & Young
