= Danger Bird =

Danger Bird or Dangerbird may refer to:

- Dangerbird Records, an American independent record label
- "Danger Bird" (Neil Young song)
- "Danger Bird", a song by Papas Fritas
- Danger Bird, a character on Kirby Buckets
