= Eldorado (EP) =

EP by Neil Young
- Released: April 17, 1989
- Recorded: December 13–15, 1988
- Studios: The Hit Factory, New York City
- Genre: Rock
- Length: 25:30
- Label: Reprise
- Producers: Neil Young; Niko Bolas

Neil Young chronology
This Note's for You (1988)	Eldorado (1989)	Freedom (1989)

Professional ratings
Review scores
Source	Rating
AllMusic	3/5 stars
Robert Christgau	B+

Eldorado is an EP released only in Japan and Australia by Neil Young backed by the Restless, which consisted of Chad Cromwell and Rick Rosas. The EP went long out of print, until April 29, 2022 when Young reissued the record on CD and vinyl for global release.

It contains three songs that subsequently appeared on Young's 1989 album Freedom; "Don't Cry", "On Broadway", and "Eldorado", and two tracks not available on any other recording, "Cocaine Eyes" and "Heavy Love".

For many years it was believed that the mixes of these tracks differed from their counterparts on Freedom, but in 2026 it was confirmed by Neil Young's engineer John Hausmann that the tracks are indeed the same mixes. The only differences are the edits for track lengths. The "Don't Cry" track on Eldorado is longer than the later version published on Freedom, for which some of the more free-form guitar work was edited out (at the insistence of co-producers Niko Bolas and Frank Sampedro).

== Track listing ==
All songs written by Neil Young, except "On Broadway" (Barry Mann, Cynthia Weil, Jerry Leiber, Mike Stoller).

No.	Title	Length
1.	"Cocaine Eyes"	4:24
2.	"Don't Cry"	5:00
3.	"Heavy Love"	5:09
4.	"On Broadway"	4:57
5.	"Eldorado"	6:03

== Personnel ==
- Neil Young – guitar, vocals
- Chad Cromwell – drums
- Rick "The Bass Player" Rosas – bass
- Frank "Poncho" Sampedro – guitar on "Eldorado"

== Notes ==
Chad Cromwell and Rick Rosas also provided rhythm on 1989's Freedom, 2005's Prairie Wind, 2006's Living with War and 2009's Fork in the Road studio albums.

== Charts ==
2022 chart performance for Eldorado
Chart (2022)	Peak position
Belgian Albums (Ultratop Flanders)	199
German Albums (Offizielle Top 100)	44
Swiss Albums (Schweizer Hitparade)	67
