= No More =

No More may refer to:

- No More (band), a German post-punk band

== Songs ==
- "No More" (1944 song), written by Bob Russell and Toots Camarata; covered by Billie Holiday
- "No More" (1961 song), a version of "La Paloma" recorded by Elvis Presley and Dean Martin
- "No More" (A1 song), 2000
- "No More" (Cassie Davis song), 2009
- "No More" (Jamelia song), 2007
- "No More" (Neil Young song), 1989
- "No More" (Ruff Endz song), 2000
- "No More (Baby I'ma Do Right)", by 3LW, 2001
- "No More (I Can't Stand It)", by Maxx, 1994
- "(My Baby Don't Love Me) No More", by the De John Sisters, 1954; covered by the McGuire Sisters, 1954
- "No More", by Badfinger from Say No More, 1981
- "No More", by Carys from To Anyone Like Me, 2020
- "No More", by CNBLUE from Code Name Blue, 2012
- "No More", by DC Talk from Nu Thang, 1990
- "No More", by Disturbed from Evolution, 2018
- "No More", by DJ Snake from Carte Blanche, 2019
- "No More", by DragonForce from Maximum Overload, 2014
- "No More", by Drowning Pool from Full Circle, 2007
- "No More", by Eddie Vedder from the Into the Wild film soundtrack, 2007
- "No More", by f(x) from Pink Tape, 2013
- "No More", by Junoon from Junoon for Peace, 2001
- "No More", by Lil Yachty from Teenage Emotions, 2017
- "No More", by LL Cool J, 2011
- "No More", by Metro Boomin from Not All Heroes Wear Capes, 2018
- "No More", by Nivea from Complicated, 2005
- "No More", by PrettyMuch, 2017
- "No More", by Rock Goddess from Hell Hath No Fury, 1983
- "No More", by Three Days Grace from Life Starts Now, 2009
- "No More", by Youth of Today from We're Not in This Alone, 1988
- "No More (This Is the Last Time)", by Depeche Mode from Spirit, 2017

== See also ==
- "No More, No More", a song by Aerosmith from Toys in the Attic
- "No More, My Lord", a prison song collected by Alan Lomax in 1948, covered by Cowboy Junkies, Pentangle, and others
- Nothing More, an American rock band
- No más (disambiguation)
