= No More (Neil Young song) =

- Promo single containing the studio version and the live SNL version

Song by Neil Young

from the album Freedom
- Released: October 2, 1989
- Recorded: March 9, 1989
- Studio: Broken Arrow Ranch
- Genre: Rock
- Length: 6:06
- Label: Reprise
- Songwriter: Neil Young
- Producers: Neil Young; Niko Bolas

Neil Young singles chronology
"Rockin' in the Free World" (1989)	"No More" (1989)	"Mansion on the Hill" (1990)

"No More" is a song written by Neil Young that was first released on his 1989 album Freedom. Although not released commercially as a single, it reached #7 on the Billboard Mainstream Rock chart. Young performed the song live on a Saturday Night Live performance on September 30, 1989.

== Lyrics and music ==
The lyrics of the song address drug addiction. Neil Young biographer Brian Kreizer describes it as a sequel to "The Needle and the Damage Done." However, "No More" does not specify which drug or drugs are being referenced.

The first verse is most explicitly about drugs. It describes how difficult it is to get free of drugs once addicted, and recovered addict who is now finally free sings "no more." Writer Ken Beilen describes the second verse as an attempt by the former addict to recover his muse and creativity now that he does not have drugs to fall back on. The third and last verse can be interpreted as being about drugs or about music. Beilen interprets it as being about the former addict being torn between a desire to do his best and a need to fill up an album's worth of songs. But music critic Johnny Rogan points out that lines like "Searchin' for a quality/Havin' to have the very best" can apply equally to the search for quality drugs as to the search for high quality songs. Greenwald seems to accept the drug interpretation, saying that the song shows the singer and addict suffering from drug psychosis. Young himself has stated that he "wasn't saying anything definitively" and that it's "completely ambiguous what's going on." Young further stated that "How many times do you have to say 'no more' before it means 'no more'? Because that song doesn't mean 'no more.'"

Beilen describes "No More" as having a "pop aesthetic. Rogan and music journalist Nigel Williamson describe the guitar playing as being in the style of Young's songs with Crazy Horse. But Beilen also notes some unusual elements. He notes that Young's vocal performance is unusual for him in that in the verses he "stretches out the notes." Beilen also points out that the refrain contains a jazz riff and that Young obtains a "unique sound" in the introduction.

== Reception ==
Allmusic critic Natthew Greenwald calls it "Young's finest anti-drug song next to 'Needle and the Damage Done,'" and also describes it as "frighteningly chilling." Rogan describes it as a "minor classic." It reached #7 on the Billboard Mainstream Rock chart.

== Live performance ==
Young performed the song live on a Saturday Night Live performance on September 30, 1989, a show on which he also performed "Rockin' in the Free World" and "The Needle and the Damage Done." Allmusic critic Stephen Thomas Erlewine called it a "great performance." This performance was included on a promotional single that also contained the studio version of the song. It was also included on the compilation album Saturday Night Live: 25 Years, Vol. 2.

== Personnel ==
- Neil Young – guitar, vocals
- Chad Cromwell – drums
- Rick Rosas – bass
- Ben Keith – keyboards
