= Year of the Horse (Neil Young album) =

Live album by Neil Young & Crazy Horse
- Released: June 17, 1997
- Recorded: May – November 1996
- Venue: Various
- Genre: Rock
- Length: 84:18
- Label: Reprise
- Producer: "Horse"

Neil Young chronology
Broken Arrow (1996)	Year of the Horse (1997)	Silver & Gold (2000)

Crazy Horse chronology
Broken Arrow (1996)	Year of the Horse (1997)	Greendale (2003)

Professional ratings
Review scores
Source	Rating
AllMusic	2.5/5 stars
Christgau’s Consumer Guide	B+
The Guardian	2/5 stars
NME	3/10
Pitchfork	3.3/10
Tom Hull – on the Web	B
Uncut	3/5 stars

Year of the Horse is a live album by Neil Young and Crazy Horse, following the band on their 1996 tour. It accompanies the film of the same name, but has a different track listing from the film.

It peaked at number 57 on the Billboard 200 chart, as well as number 36 on the UK Albums Chart.

== Track listing ==
All tracks are written by Neil Young.

Disc one
No.	Title	Length
1.	"When You Dance I Can Really Love"	6:20
2.	"Barstool Blues"	9:02
3.	"When Your Lonely Heart Breaks"	5:04
4.	"Mr. Soul"	5:05
5.	"Big Time"	7:28
6.	"Pocahontas"	4:50
7.	"Human Highway"	4:07

Disc two
No.	Title	Length
1.	"Slip Away"	10:52
2.	"Scattered (Let's Think About Livin')"	4:00
3.	"Danger Bird"	13:34
4.	"Prisoners of Rock 'n' Roll"	6:40
5.	"Sedan Delivery" (not included on the vinyl version)	7:16

== Personnel ==
- Neil Young – guitar, piano, harmonica, vocals
- Poncho Sampedro – guitar, keyboards, vocals
- Billy Talbot – bass guitar, vocals
- Ralph Molina – drums, percussion, vocals
- John Hausmann – recording
- Tim Mulligan – mixing, mastering
- Gary Burden – art direction, design
- Jenice Heo – art direction, design
- Lars Larsen – cover photography
- L.A. Johnson – back cover photography
- Jim Jarmusch – inside photography

== Charts ==
Chart performance for Year of the Horse
Chart (1997)	Peak position
Australian Albums (ARIA)	77
Austrian Albums (Ö3 Austria)	31
Belgian Albums (Ultratop Flanders)	11
Canada Top Albums/CDs (RPM)	75
Dutch Albums (Album Top 100)	51
Finnish Albums (Suomen virallinen lista)	19
German Albums (Offizielle Top 100)	30
Norwegian Albums (VG-lista)	19
Swedish Albums (Sverigetopplistan)	35
UK Albums (Official Charts)	36
US Billboard 200	57
