= Mark & the Escorts =

- Origin: Los Angeles, California, United States
- Genres: Surf rock
- Years active: 1963-1966
- Members: Mark Guerrero; Robert Warren; Ernie Hernandez; Rick Rosas; Ricky Almara; Joe Cabral; Richard Magaña

Mark & the Escorts was an American rock and roll band from Los Angeles, California.

== Career ==
The band formed in 1963, at first playing instrumental surf guitar songs such as “Wipe Out," “Pipeline,” and songs by The Ventures and Dick Dale. They played at high school parties and other small venues until they were discovered by Billy Cardenas, a local manager and producer. Cardenas managed such local bands as The Blendells, The Premiers, and Cannibal & the Headhunters. He began to get the band into larger gigs. On February 21, 1965, the band performed at the Shrine Auditorium with all the top East Side bands at a show called the West Coast East Side Revue. An album of the same name was eventually released on Eddie Davis' Rampart Records containing studio recordings by the participating bands.

By this time, the lead singer, Ricky Almaraz, left and Richard Magaña (baritone sax) and Joe Cabral (Farfisa organ) joined. In June 1965, Cardenas recorded two instrumentals, “Get Your Baby” and “Tuff Stuff.” at Stereo Masters studio in Hollywood. "Get Your Baby" was written by two members of The Mixtures, Randy Thomas and Wayne Edwards. "Get Your Baby" was also recorded during the same era by two of East L.A.'s most popular bands, The Blendells and The Premiers. Mark Guerrero received writers credit for the flip side, "Tuff Stuff." In October, they returned to the studio and recorded a vocal number entitled “Dance with Me,” with a singer Billy Cardenas brought into the project, and an instrumental called “Silly Putty.” "Dance with Me" was written and first recorded by another East L.A. band called The Fabulous Desires.

Mark & the Escorts continued to perform for about another year, and then in 1966, changed the name of the band to the Men from S.O.U.N.D.

The three core members of Mark & the Escorts, Mark Guerrero, Rick Rosas, and Ernie Hernandez, stayed together throughout the 1960s, eventually recording an album of Mark Guerrero songs for A&M Records in the early 70s as members of a rock band called Tango.
