= Broken Arrow (album) =

Studio album by Neil Young with Crazy Horse
- Released: July 2, 1996
- Recorded: March 21 – April 17, 1996
- Studios: Plywood Digital, Woodside, California (Note: except "Baby What You Want Me to Do": Old Princeton Landing, Princeton-by-the-Sea, California)
- Genres: Blues rock; folk rock
- Length: 46:23
- Label: Reprise
- Producer: Neil Young

Neil Young chronology
Dead Man (1996)	Broken Arrow (1996)	Year of the Horse (1997)

Crazy Horse chronology
Sleeps with Angels (1994)	Broken Arrow (1996)	Year of the Horse (1997)

Singles from Broken Arrow
- 1. "Big Time" / "Interstate" Released: 1996

Professional ratings
Review scores
Source	Rating
AllMusic	2.5/5 stars
Robert Christgau	(2-star Honorable Mention)

Broken Arrow is the twenty-fourth studio album by Canadian-American musician Neil Young, and his eighth with Crazy Horse, released in 1996.

== Background and recording ==
The sessions for the album were held at Young's ranch in Northern California in the spring of 1996. The sessions were Young's first without producer David Briggs, who had died of lung cancer the previous year. The group struggled to record a new album without the guidance and leadership of Briggs. For inspiration, they booked a series of gigs at local clubs prior to the sessions. The final track is a live version of a Jimmy Reed song that was recorded on an audience microphone at one such small "secret" gig in California, giving it a bootleg feel. The first three songs are in the form of long, structured jams. In Shakey, Young describes the album as "vulnerable and unfinished. I wanted to get one under my belt without David."

== Songs ==
"Changing Highways" dates from 1974, and was first recorded by the group that year at Chess Records in Chicago. The session had been their first as a reconstituted group with Poncho Sampedro. The idea of recording the song in 1996 came from Sampedro, who wanted to make another attempt at the song after feeling like he had not taken the first attempt seriously enough. In a 2021 interview, he remembered meeting Young and jamming with the other musicians in the band without realizing they were rehearsing for a session the following day, and then reintroducing the song to Young two decades later:

"But anyway, the bottom line was, I had no clue. No clue at all that those were the songs we were going to be recording the next day and I was supposed to be learning. Taking shorthand and paying attention. I was just going, 'I don't know if I like that one. That's hard.' When it finally got recorded and put on a record, we were sitting in a studio one day after David passed. I just played "Changing Highways". Neil said, 'Wow, that was pretty cool, Ponch.' I said, 'Well, you know, ever since that session, I really wanted to record it with you again and I practiced it all these years. Just in case you ever pulled it out, I'd be ready.' He said, 'Well, it sounded so good. We should do it.'"

Young's association with "Baby What You Want Me to Do" dates from his earliest days singing in a music group, The Squires, as a teenager. He remembers his early fondness for Jimmy Reed in his memoir, Super Deluxe:

"I loved the simplicity and honesty that oozed from every one of his songs. His voice was not amazing and his harmonica was simple and direct, while not being derivative. [...] To me, he was very haunting, one of the greats, a genius original, making the most of the least, with a definitive sound in the blues."

== Release ==
A bonus track, "Interstate", was included on the vinyl record release of the album and the CD single of "Big Time", and is an outtake from the 1990 Ragged Glory sessions. Although he would make Looking Forward with Crosby, Stills & Nash released in 1999, this record would be the last studio album by Neil Young for four years and the last in a string of rock albums broken only by Harvest Moon.

== Track listing ==
All tracks by Neil Young, except where noted.

Broken Arrow track listing
No.	Title	Writer(s)	Length
1.	"Big Time"		7:24
2.	"Loose Change"		9:10
3.	"Slip Away"		8:36
4.	"Changing Highways"		2:28
5.	"Scattered (Let's Think About Livin')"		4:13
6.	"This Town"		2:59
7.	"Music Arcade"		3:59
8.	"Baby What You Want Me to Do"	Jimmy Reed	8:08

Vinyl bonus track
No.	Title	Length
9.	"Interstate"	6:24

== Personnel ==
- Neil Young – vocals, guitars, piano, harmonica, production, mixing

Crazy Horse

- Ralph Molina – drums, percussion, backing vocals
- Frank "Poncho" Sampedro – electric guitar, backing vocals
- Billy Talbot – bass guitar, tambourine, backing vocals

Additional roles

- Gary Burden, Jesse Burden – art direction & design
- Jenice Heo – computer design
- Larry Cragg – photography
- Elliot Roberts – direction
- Greg Archilla – recording (1–7), mixing
- John Hausmann – recording assistance (1–7)
- Tim Mulligan – recording (8)

== Charts ==
Chart performance for Broken Arrow
Chart (1996)	Peak position
Australian Albums (ARIA)	43
Austrian Albums (Ö3 Austria)	25
Belgian Albums (Ultratop Flanders)	13
Belgian Albums (Ultratop Wallonia)	21
Canada Top Albums/CDs (RPM)	26
Canadian Albums (Billboard)	19
Dutch Albums (Album Top 100)	24
Finnish Albums (Suomen virallinen lista)	12
French Albums (SNEP)	42
German Albums (Offizielle Top 100)	13
Italian Albums (FIMI)	42
New Zealand Albums (RMNZ)	27
Norwegian Albums (VG-lista)	9
Swedish Albums (Sverigetopplistan)	14
Swiss Albums (Schweizer Hitparade)	25
UK Albums (Official Charts)	17
US Billboard 200	31
