= Arc (Neil Young and Crazy Horse album) =

Live album by Neil Young & Crazy Horse
- Released: November 12, 1991
- Recorded: February – April 1991
- Venue: Various
- Genres: Noise rock; musique concrete; sound collage
- Length: 35:00
- Label: Reprise/Warner Bros.
- Producer: Neil Young

Neil Young chronology
Weld (1991)	Arc (1991)	Harvest Moon (1992)

Crazy Horse chronology
Weld (1991)	Arc (1991)	Sleeps with Angels (1994)

Professional ratings
Review scores
Source	Rating
AllMusic	2/5 stars

Arc is an album by Neil Young and Crazy Horse, recorded early 1991 and released in November 1991.

The album consists of feedback, guitar noise, improvisations and vocal fragments that were recorded during various live shows on the 1991 US tour, and then re-edited into a 35-minute composition. Arc was originally released with the live album Weld in a special-edition 3-CD set called Arc-Weld. Separate releases of Arc and of Weld soon followed.

== Background ==
According to an interview with Steve Martin of Agnostic Front that appeared in the December 1991 issue of Pulse! magazine, Arc had its genesis in a film that Young made called Muddy Track (referred to in an interview with David Fricke in the November 28, 1991, issue of Rolling Stone), which consisted of the beginnings and endings of various songs from his 1987 European tour. Young placed a video camera on his amplifier during the 1987 tour and recorded the beginnings and endings of various songs, and later edited them down into the film's soundtrack. "It was the sound of the entire band being sucked into this little limiter, being compressed and fuckin' distorted to hell," Young said to Martin, referring to the soundtrack of Muddy Track. Young then showed the video to Sonic Youth's Thurston Moore, who suggested that he record an entire album in a similar manner. However, Arc was not recorded through video camera microphones, as was the case with Muddy Track, but instead was compiled from various professional multi-track recordings made throughout the tour.

Young's use of experimental guitar feedback was also inspired by Sonic Youth, the noise-rock band that opened for parts of his live tours in 1990 and 1991.

== Track listing ==
No.	Title	Length
1.	"Arc (A Compilation Composition)"	35:00

== Personnel ==
- Neil Young – guitar, vocals, computer, feedback, production, mixing
- Frank "Poncho" Sampedro – guitar, univox stringman, vocals
- Billy Talbot – bass, vocals, production, mixing
- Ralph Molina – drums, vocals
- Sal Trentino – electronics

Additional roles

- David Briggs – production, recording
- Joel Bernstein, Mark Mauriello – photography
- Janet Levinson – art direction
- Tim Mulligan – mixing, editing, mastering
- Dave Hewitt – recording
- Phil Gitomer, Dave Roberts, Brian Leskowicz – assistant engineering
- Elliot Roberts – direction

== See also ==
- Metal Machine Music, a studio album by Lou Reed with a similar concept.
