= Danger Bird (Neil Young song) =

Song by Neil Young

from the album Zuma
- Released: November 10, 1975
- Recorded: June 3, 1975
- Studio: Point Dume, California
- Genre: Hard rock; blues rock
- Length: 6:54
- Label: Reprise
- Songwriter: Neil Young
- Producers: Neil Young; David Briggs

"Danger Bird" is a song written by Neil Young. It was first released on his 1975 album with Crazy Horse, Zuma. A live version was also released on the 1997 album Year of the Horse.

== Music and lyrics ==
"Danger Bird" was recorded in two different sessions several weeks apart that were put together by co-producer David Briggs. It and the more famous "Cortez the Killer" are two songs on Zuma in which Young and Crazy Horse return to the style of songs like "Down by the River" with long feedback-heavy guitar passages. It is styled as a slow folk song in a minor key. The music provides an intense, brooding atmosphere. In some of the verses a member of Crazy Horse takes the lead vocal while Young provides a backup vocal singing different words.

The lyrics to "Danger Bird" reflect the disintegration of Young's relationship with Carrie Snodgress. Some of the lyrics, including the lines "'Cause you've been with another man/There you are and here I am," were originally written for an unreleased song titled "L.A. Girls and Ocean Boys" that was inspired by a trip Young made to visit Snodgrass in which he found out she had been cheating on him. Music critic Johnny Rogan interprets the titular bird as a "metaphor for a doomed relationship." Rogan finds some hopefulness in the final lines "And though these wings have turned to stone/I can fly, fly fly away." Music journalist Nigel Williamson is reminded of imagery from Young's 1968 song "The Loner" by the line "Danger bird, he flies alone." Music author Ken Bielen finds additional themes in the song as the comfort we find in complacency and our fear of being vulnerable, for example in line in which the titular bird sings that "freedom's just a prison."

Young said of "Danger Bird" that "that's a wild song. It's so slow and great. Isn't it slow? Briggs always wanted to remix it. I like the mix. A combination of two songs. 'L.A. Girls and Ocean Boys' I never recorded, but it's part of 'Danger Bird.' Hey, sometimes that's what happens—one song doesn't come out, I'll be writin' another and say 'Oh, that fits.' Bang! Drop it right in."

== Reception ==
Rock and Roll Hall of Fame guitarist Lou Reed considered the guitar playing on "Danger Bird" to be the best he had ever heard, stating "It makes me cry, it is the best I have heard in my life. The guy is a spectacular guitarist, those melodies are so marvelous, so calculated, constructed note to note… he must have killed to get those notes. It puts my hairs on end!”. David Downing suggests that this may be an overstatement but that the performance is nonetheless "remarkable." Downing praises the intensity produced by the "straining and stretching notes" that Young plays "almost in slow motion." Downing especially notes the accompaniment to the final line about flying with stone wings, where Downing feels that the guitar playing allows the listener to feel how heavy those stone wings are but still makes the listener believe that the bird will find a way to fly with them anyway. AllMusic critic Matthew Greenwald describes the guitar solos by Young and Crazy Horse rhythm guitarist Frank Sampedro as being "exquisite."

Williamson describes the song as representing Young and Crazy Horse "at their brooding best." Young biographer Jimmy McDonough describes "Danger Bird" as "perhaps the most unsettling song Young has created, a soundtrack worthy of those ten-cent portraits of Hell found in a Coffin Joe flick," and also "a masterpiece, a trip inside the darkest recesses of Shakey's mind." Pitchfork contributor Rob Mitchum describes the song as a "triumphantly moody, electric epic" which provides "spacious opportunities for Young to revive his trademark lacerating guitar tone." Neil Young FAQ author Glen Boyd, comparing it to "Cortez the Killer," calls it an "equally stunning, if somewhat more underrated contender for a Neil Young and Old Black hall of fame. Rolling Stone Album Guide contributor Paul Evans describes "Danger Bird" as a "standout" track on Zuma. Village Voice critic Robert Christgau describes the song as "sprawling blockbuster cut" which he considers compromised to some extent by its "relative neatness and control."

A 2015 reader poll by Rolling Stone ranked "Danger Bird" as Young's 7th best "deep cut." A year earlier the editors of Rolling Stone rated "Danger Bird" to be the 24th best Neil Young song of all time.

== Live performances ==
Young almost never plays "Danger Bird" live unless he is performing with Crazy Horse. A live version appears on the 1997 live album Year of the Horse. Bielen describes the guitar playing at the beginning of the song to have an "industrial wah-wah sound" before proceeding to "distorted power chords." This version lasts more than 13 minutes as a result of a lot of jamming.

== Personnel ==
- Neil Young – guitar, vocals
- Frank Sampedro – guitar
- Billy Talbot – bass, vocals
- Ralph Molina – drums, vocals
