= Rockin' in the Free World =

Single by Neil Young

from the album Freedom
- B-side: "Rockin' in the Free World (acoustic live)"
- Released: November 14, 1989
- Recorded: March 10, 1989
- Studio: The Barn, Redwood Digital, Woodside, California
- Genre: Hard rock; country rock; arena rock; heartland rock
- Length: 3:38 (acoustic version); 4:40 (electric version)
- Label: Reprise
- Songwriter: Neil Young
- Producers: Neil Young; Niko Bolas

Neil Young singles chronology
"Ten Men Workin'" (1988)	"Rockin' in the Free World" (1989)	"No More" (1989)

Audio
- "Rockin' in the Free World" on YouTube

"Rockin' in the Free World" is a song by Canadian-American singer-songwriter Neil Young from his seventeenth studio album Freedom (1989). Two versions of the song bookend the album, similarly to "Hey Hey, My My (Into the Black)" from Young's Rust Never Sleeps album, one of which is performed with a predominantly acoustic arrangement, and the other predominantly electric. In 2003, Rolling Stone ranked "Rockin' In the Free World" number 216 on its list of the 500 Greatest Songs of All Time.

== Context ==
Young wrote the song while on tour with his band The Restless in February 1989. He learned that a planned concert tour to the Soviet Union was not going to happen and his guitarist Frank "Poncho" Sampedro said "we'll have to keep on rockin' in the free world". The phrase struck Young, who thought it could be the hook in a song about "stuff going on with the Ayatollah and all this turmoil in the world.” He had the lyrics the next day.

The lyrics criticize the George H. W. Bush administration, then in its first month, quoting Bush's famous "thousand points of light" remark from his 1989 inaugural address and his 1988 presidential campaign promise for America to become a "kinder, gentler nation". The song also refers to Ayatollah Khomeini's proclamation that the United States was the "Great Satan" and Jesse Jackson's 1988 campaign slogan, "Keep hope alive". The song was first performed live on February 21, 1989, in Seattle with The Restless, without the band having rehearsed it.

The song is included on Young's Greatest Hits (2004) release. It reached No. 2 on the Billboard's Mainstream Rock Tracks chart.

== Saturday Night Live ==
Young performed the song live in September 1989 for the television show Saturday Night Live. For the performance, Young played with Poncho Sampedro, Charley Drayton and Steve Jordan. In concert, Young would typically play the song well into the set, when the band's energy is at a high. To achieve the same energy, Young worked out with his trainer 30 minutes before the performance. He told author Jimmy McDonough:

"I don't like TV. Never have. It always sucks and there's nothing you can do about it. I was trying to get to the place where I would be when I did 'Rockin’ in the Free World' during my live show. To do that I had to ignore Saturday Night Live completely. I had to pretend I wasn’t there. I had a dressing room, a little place with an amp in it, in another part of the building. And I walked from there into Saturday Night Live—and then left. I developed a whole new technique for television. I had my trainer, and we just lifted weights and I did calisthenics to get my blood to the level it would be at after performing for an hour and twenty-five minutes—which is usually how long I’d be onstage by the time I did that song. To perform that song the way it’s supposed to be performed, you have to be at peak blood level. Everything has to be up, your machine has to be stoked. You can’t walk on cold and do that or you’re gonna look like a fuckin’ idiot. So that’s what I did. I tried to warm up and come on, like, y’know, not part of the show. Like they changed the channel for a minute."

Comedian and former SNL cast member Dennis Miller later said that "Rockin' in the Free World" was the greatest performance on the show in its history.

== Personnel ==
- Neil Young – guitar, vocals
- Rick Rosas – bass
- Frank Sampedro – guitar, vocals
- Ben Keith – keyboards
- Chad Cromwell – drums

== Charts ==
Chart (1989–1994)	Peak position
Canada Top Singles (RPM)	39
UK Singles (Official Charts)	83
US Billboard Mainstream Rock	2

== Certifications ==
Region	Certification	Certified units/sales
New Zealand (RMNZ)	Gold	15,000^{‡}
^{‡} Sales+streaming figures based on certification alone.

== Cover versions ==
"Rockin' in the Free World" has been recorded by numerous artists. A version by The Alarm appears on their album Raw (1991). Pearl Jam, joined by Neil Young, performed the song at the 1993 MTV Video Music Awards; the band frequently performs it live in concert. Suzi Quatro covered it on her 2005 album Back to the Drive. It was also covered by Swiss hard rock band Krokus on their 2017 covers collection Big Rocks. Roots rock duo Larkin Poe released a cover on their 2020 album Kindred Spirits. SHINEDOWN members Brent Smith and Zach Myers covered the song in acoustic in 2020 on their side project album "Smith & Myers: Volume 1". American nu metal band Soil released a cover in 2022. Numerous bands and artists have covered this song live, including Simple Minds, Bon Jovi, Joe Satriani and The New Roses.

== Use of the song in US politics ==
An edited cut of the electric version of the song was used over the final credits of Michael Moore's film Fahrenheit 9/11 and the song was re-released as a single at the time of the film's release.

Since its release the song has been used a number of times at different US political events.

In 2015 and 2016, the song was played during Donald Trump's entrance preceding his formal announcement that he would run as a Republican candidate for the 2016 presidency. Young, a longtime supporter of Bernie Sanders, said that Trump's use of "Rockin' in the Free World" was not authorized. The contention, later determined to be a licensing issue, was resolved, and Trump's campaign pledged to not use the song without permission. Young explained to Rolling Stone that he had no issue with the campaign using the song, provided permission was asked for and granted.

Bernie Sanders also used the song at rallies for his 2016 presidential campaign.

In 2020, Trump again used the song at a pre-Fourth of July speech at Mount Rushmore on July 3, along with two other Young songs ("Like a Hurricane" and "Cowgirl in the Sand"). A tweet from Young from the official Neil Young Archives Twitter account responded to the usage of "Rockin' in the Free World” by retweeting a tweet from Rapid City Journal reporter Morgan Matzen that contained a video with the song playing at the Trump event with Young adding "This is NOT ok with me…". A minute later Young retweeted a second Matzen tweet, this time one showing a video of Young's song "Like a Hurricane" playing before the President took the stage, with Young adding "I stand in solidarity with the Lakota Sioux & this is NOT ok with me." On August 4, 2020, Young filed a lawsuit in the Southern District of New York against the Trump campaign for copyright infringement for its use of "Rockin' in the Free World" and "Devil's Sidewalk" after both songs had been removed from ASCAP's political license. On December 7, 2020, Young voluntarily dismissed the case with neither party commenting on a possible settlement.

In May 2024, U.S. Secretary of State Antony Blinken sang and played rhythm guitar on the song with Ukrainian punk rock band 19.99 at a bar in Kyiv, Ukraine. Blinken was in the Ukrainian capital to meet President Volodymyr Zelenskyy to discuss battlefield updates and the significance of recent U.S. military aid. This visit was the first by a Biden administration official since the approval of U.S. supplemental funding for Ukraine.

The song was most recently used at the 2024 Democratic National Convention on August 21, 2024 after Tim Walz gave the final speech of the evening to the assembled, with Young's approval.

In October 2026, Young sued Trump 47 Committee Inc, a political action committee (PAC), in US district court for Virginia after Trump used the song during rallies for the 2026 midterm elections. The lawsuit alleged copyright infringement, claiming Trump is in violation of a settlement in the 2020 case in which Trump promised to never use the song without permission again. The lawsuit is asking for $10 million in damages, alleging that Young "has suffered damage to his reputation and brand as a result of the implication that he supports Donald J Trump in any way".
