= Ragged Glory =

Studio album by Neil Young & Crazy Horse
- Released: September 10, 1990
- Recorded: April 1990
- Studios: Plywood Digital, Woodside, California (Note: except "Mother Earth": The Hoosier Dome)
- Genres: Garage rock; grunge
- Length: 62:43
- Label: Reprise
- Producers: Neil Young; David Briggs

Neil Young chronology
Freedom (1989)	Ragged Glory (1990)	Weld (1991)

Crazy Horse chronology
Left for Dead (1989)	Ragged Glory (1990)	Weld (1991)

Singles from Ragged Glory
- 1. "Mansion on the Hill" / "Don't Spook the Horse" Released: September 4, 1990; 2. "Over and Over" Released: December 1990

Ragged Glory is the twentieth studio album by Canadian-American singer-songwriter Neil Young, and his sixth album with the band Crazy Horse. It was released by Reprise Records on September 10, 1990. Ragged Glory was voted the 36th best grunge album of all time by Rolling Stone in 2019. A live recording of the album from November 2023 was released as Fuckin' Up in April 2024.

== Recording ==
The Ragged Glory sessions took place in April 1990 at Young's Broken Arrow Ranch. The band played a set of songs twice a day for a couple of weeks (never repeating the same songs in a set), then went back, listened and chose the best takes. According to Young, this approach "took 'analysis' out of the game during the sessions, allowing the Horse to not think".

== Music and lyrics ==
The album revisits the heavy rock style previously explored on Everybody Knows This Is Nowhere and Zuma. "Country Home" and "White Line" both date from the mid-1970s. Like Everybody Knows This Is Nowhere, the album features many extended guitar jams, with two songs stretching out to more than ten minutes. In an October 1990 interview with Rolling Stone's James Henke, Young compares the two albums:

"It's probably closer to that record than anything else I've done. I can't compare it to anything else. I purposely wanted to play long instrumentals because I don't hear any jamming on any other records. There's nothing spontaneous going on on records these days, except in blues and funkier music. Rock & roll used to have all that. People aren't reaching out in the instrumental passages and spontaneously letting them last as long as they can. I love to do that, but I can only really do it well with one band. I tried it a little on Freedom. But that style of music is better for me with Crazy Horse. We played just like a band. It wasn't someone in a control room with a bunch of machines, a MIDI and synthesizers and a drum machine and producers and tech people. You just can't get that old-time vibrating feeling with machines. That happens with musicians who just love to play and improvise together. I knew that not many people were doing that, so I really wanted to do it. We did cut an acoustic track for it, but it wasn't one I wrote in the same time frame as I wrote the majority of the songs. It just didn't fit, the feeling didn't fit, so we left it off. It's funny, I wrote seven of the songs in a week. It was two weeks before Farm Aid. Those are the last seven songs on the album. The first two, "Country Home" and "White Line," I wrote years and years ago; they were songs we were never able to get right back then. And I wrote "Fuckin' Up" around the end of the Freedom period, when I did Saturday Night Live. We used it for a warm-up song there."

"Farmer John" is a cover of a 1960s song, written and performed by R&B duo Don and Dewey and also performed by British Invasion group The Searchers as well as garage band The Premiers. Young explains the inclusion of the cover: "That was really spontaneous. It just came about while we were practicing one day. Well, we were recording, because practicing and recording are all the same for us. We were rolling the tape and putting things down, but we'd just about finished the album and then we got this take." Young used to play the song as a teenager in his first live performances in a band. He credits these performances with discovering his love for improvisation and playing live. Poncho Sampedro remembers asking Young "Man, why don't we just play some song that you played in your first band when you were starting out? Let's just play something different to be loose." He then started 'Farmer John.' We played it one time. And it made it on the record.

The song "Days that Used to Be" is inspired by Bob Dylan's "My Back Pages" and employs the same melody. It was written while sailing in the Pacific after the release of This Note's for You.

The closing track, "Mother Earth (Natural Anthem)", uses the melody of the folk song "The Water Is Wide". Young recorded the guitar at Farm Aid and said it is "based on an old hymn. I don't know the name of it, but it's a traditional melody from years gone by. And I modified it. I used different chords and screwed around with it. The folk process. I'm just an old folkie; I can't find my acoustic guitar anymore, that's the problem [laughs]."

Outtake and B-side "Don't Spook the Horse" was promoted as a "special profane bonus track". Young told Rolling Stone that it is "a condensed version of the whole album. Especially for reviewers who don't like me at all. Just listen to that one, and you'll get all you need."

The song title was inspired by the band's tendency to lose their nerve and ability to play with feeling when there is a sense they are being watched or judged. Guitarist Poncho Sampedro explained in a March 2021 interview for Rolling Stone: "John Hanlon was a new guy and we didn't know him. He started running around behind our amps and looking at everything and checking out the front of the amps where the mics were placed and looking at this and that, and looking at the room mics. He was just everywhere and I ended up calling him 'The Fly' because he was floating around everywhere. The next day, we went to play the songs and we just couldn't. Things we started the day before just fell apart. That's when Briggs said, 'Well, you can't spook the horse.'"

== Reception and legacy ==
Professional ratings
Review scores
Source	Rating
AllMusic	4.5/5 stars
Chicago Tribune	4/4 stars
Encyclopedia of Popular Music	3/5 stars
Entertainment Weekly	A−
Los Angeles Times	4/5 stars
MusicHound Rock	4/5
Rolling Stone	4.5/5 stars
The Rolling Stone Album Guide	5/5 stars
Spin Alternative Record Guide	8/10
The Village Voice	A−

In a contemporary review for Rolling Stone, Kurt Loder hailed Ragged Glory as "a monument to the spirit of the garage - to the pursuit of passion over precision" and calling it "a great one". In the Los Angeles Times, John D'Agostino deemed the record "garage rock" and "impressive primitivism coming from a 45-year-old rock icon", while Village Voice critic Robert Christgau called it "an atavistic garage stomp" that "makes good on several potent fantasies--eternal renewal, the garage as underground, the guitar as shibboleth and idea." It was voted album of the year in The Village Voice's annual Pazz & Jop critics' poll, and in 2010 it was selected by Rolling Stone as the 77th best album of the 1990s. The album was also included in the book 1001 Albums You Must Hear Before You Die.

The CD single culled from the album, "Mansion on the Hill", included the otherwise unreleased song "Don't Spook the Horse" (7:36). "F*!#in' Up" (pronounced "Fuckin' Up") is frequently covered by Pearl Jam live (see Category:Pearl Jam Official Bootlegs for recordings), and was performed by Bush in their headlining set at Woodstock 1999. Toronto-based band Constantines recorded a version of "F*!#in' Up" in Winnipeg, which surfaced as the B-side to their "Our Age" 7" in November 2008. Scottish heavy metal band The Almighty recorded the song and included it as a B-side (with an uncensored title) to their "Out of Season" single in 1992. An outtake from the sessions for the album, "Interstate", was released on the vinyl version of the 1996 album Broken Arrow and on the CD single for the track "Big Time". UK Americana band The Whybirds frequently covered the song live.

== Smell the Horse ==
In December 2018 Young revealed in a post on his Archives website that during the process of remastering the album, engineer John Hanlon discovered 38 minutes of unreleased music from the recording sessions (featuring "five songs, with two versions of one, and one long extended take of another"). The expanded set, named Ragged Glory II, was expected to be released on CD, vinyl and Hi-Res audio in 2020 but was delayed. In February 2021, the album was again announced, now titled Smell the Horse, containing all of Ragged Glory as well as "four added tracks", and was set for release later that year, but was eventually pushed back to 2023.

== Track listing ==
All songs written by Neil Young except as noted.

Ragged Glory track listing
No.	Title	Writer(s)	Length
1.	"Country Home"		7:05
2.	"White Line"		2:57
3.	"Fuckin' Up"	Neil Young, Frank "Poncho" Sampedro	5:54
4.	"Over and Over"		8:28
5.	"Love to Burn"		10:00
6.	"Farmer John"	Don Harris, Dewey Terry	4:14
7.	"Mansion on the Hill"		4:48
8.	"Days That Used to Be"		3:42
9.	"Love and Only Love"		10:18
10.	"Mother Earth (Natural Anthem)"		5:11

Smell the Horse track listing
No.	Title	Length
1.	"Interstate"	6:22
2.	"Don't Spook the Horse"	7:51
3.	"Boxcar"	3:16
4.	"Born to Run"	12:13

== B-sides ==
B-sides on Ragged Glory singles
Title	Single
"Don't Spook the Horse"	"Mansion on the Hill"
"Interstate"	"Big Time"

== Personnel ==
- Neil Young – guitar, vocals, production, mixing

Crazy Horse

- Frank "Poncho" Sampedro – guitar, vocals
- Billy Talbot – bass guitar, vocals
- Ralph Molina – drums, vocals

Additional roles

- David Briggs – production, mixing
- Janet Levinson – art design
- Larry Cragg – photography
- Elliot Roberts – direction
- John Hanlon – production ("Smell the Horse" edition), mixing, recording, engineering
- Dave Collins, Andrew Vastola, Buzz Burrowes, Gary Long, Pat Stoltz, Chris Kupper, Chuck Johnson, John Nowlan, Harry Sitam – engineering
- Tim Mulligan – engineering, mastering

== Charts ==
Chart performance for Ragged Glory
Chart (1990)	Peak position
Australian Albums (ARIA)	62
Canada Top Albums/CDs (RPM)	20
Dutch Albums (Album Top 100)	19
Finnish Albums (Suomen virallinen lista)	18
German Albums (Offizielle Top 100)	42
New Zealand Albums (RMNZ)	22
Norwegian Albums (VG-lista)	13
Swedish Albums (Sverigetopplistan)	25
Swiss Albums (Schweizer Hitparade)	38
UK Albums (Official Charts)	15
US Billboard 200	31

Chart performance for singles from Ragged Glory
Year	Title	Chart	Peak position
1990	"Mansion on the Hill"	Billboard Mainstream Rock Tracks	3
1990	"Over and Over"	Billboard Mainstream Rock Tracks	33

== Certifications ==
Certifications for Ragged Glory
Region	Certification	Certified units/sales
Canada (Music Canada)	Gold	50,000^{^}
United Kingdom (BPI)	Silver	60,000^{^}
^{^} Shipments figures based on certification alone.
