= No más =

No más (Spanish for 'no more') may refer to:

- "No Más" (Breaking Bad), a season three episode of the TV series Breaking Bad
- Sugar Ray Leonard vs. Roberto Durán II, a 1980 boxing match known as the "No Más Fight"
- No Más (album), a 2010 album by American duo Javelin
- An "I quit" match in the professional wrestling promotion Lucha Underground
- A lyric in the Nirvana song Endless, Nameless (song).

== See also ==
- No More (disambiguation)
