= This Note's for You =

Studio album by Neil Young & The Bluenotes
- Released: April 11, 1988
- Recorded: November 1987 – January 1988
- Studios: Studio Instrument Rentals, Hollywood, California
- Genres: Heartland rock; blues rock; jump blues
- Length: 39:25
- Label: Reprise
- Producers: Neil Young; Niko Bolas

Neil Young chronology
Life (1987)	This Note's for You (1988)	Eldorado (1989)

Singles from This Note's for You
- 1. "Ten Men Workin'" / "I'm Goin'" Released: April 1988; 2. "This Note's for You (Edited Live Version)" / "This Note's for You (LP Version)" Released: June 1988

Professional ratings
Review scores
Source	Rating
AllMusic	3/5 stars
The Village Voice	B−

This Note's for You is the eighteenth studio album by Canadian-American musician Neil Young, released April 11, 1988, on Reprise. The album marked Young's return to the recently reactivated Reprise Records after a rocky tenure with Geffen Records.

It was originally credited to "Young and the Bluenotes". Part of the album's concept centered on the commercialism of rock and roll, and tours in particular (the title track, specifically, is a hostile social commentary on concert sponsorship). The music is marked by the use of a horn section.

In 2015, Young released a live album from the album's accompanying tour, which he titled Bluenote Café.

== Background ==
During the 1987 tour with Crazy Horse, Young began playing a short "blues" set between the standard acoustic and electric sets, featuring Crazy Horse (with Poncho Sampedro playing organ instead of guitar), Ben Keith, and Young's guitar tech Larry Cragg on saxophones. The song "This Note's for You" was debuted at those shows. Young liked the results ("...[crowd] were going fucking nuts and no one was shouting for "Southern Man" like they've done throughout my whole fucking career"), and following the tour conclusion he further expanded the horn section, dubbing the new band The Bluenotes.

== Writing ==
Young wrote most of the songs on an old Gibson guitar owned by his wife Pegi since she was a child. He recalls writing "Ten Men Working" in a contemporary interview:

"I had this groove going through my head and I was playing it on my guitar, which is actually my wife's guitar, which she's had since she was just a little teenybopper, I guess. She took it everywhere with her. And it really feels like her, so I wrote every song on this album, except one, on that guitar. It's an old Gibson, like a J-45 or something. It just feels so good. I'd be walking around the house playing. And I had this groove going, didn't have any lyrics, but I don't try and make up words. I figure something'll happen and I'll start singin' the words. Until then, I don't have any words. I never just try and think of something clever. So the way "Ten Men Workin'" came to me was...one morning I was gettin' ready to go into where we recorded the Bluenotes record, on Melrose Avenue across from the Hollywood Cemetery. One of the guys, the engineer of my boat, had a Men At Work T-shirt on. I just kept lookin' at that T-shirt and started thinkin', 'Yeah, that's me. I'm workin' and we're workin'.' It's like we were building something. We had this job to do. It's like it was our mission to make people feel good and to make 'em dance.

Young remembers writing "This's Note's For You" while on tour: "I remember writing it in my bus, turning to my driver and saying, 'Jesus Christ, this must be the most idiotic fucking song I've ever written.' I still can't believe that such a dumb little song could have helped resuscitate my career the way it did."

"Sunny Inside" dates from 1982, the only song that wasn't written during the album's production.

== Recording ==
The band made its live debut in November 1987 with a 10-date California club tour, playing mostly new material, influenced by classic R&B and big band sound, mixed with several old numbers dating back to Young's earliest band, The Squires (such as "Ain't It the Truth"). The Bluenotes then entered the studio to start recording, however Young became dissatisfied with the performances of the Crazy Horse rhythm section; bassist Billy Talbot was fired first, temporarily replaced by George Whitsell before Rick Rosas was finally brought in, while drummer Ralph Molina was replaced by Rosas's bandmate Chad Cromwell. Most of the songs were then either overdubbed or redone from scratch with Rosas and Cromwell; only "One Thing" and rarity "Ain't It the Truth" still feature Whitsell and Molina's playing.

This Note's for You was originally attributed to Neil Young and the Bluenotes (as can be seen on the early editions of the album), however, after musician Harold Melvin took legal action against Young over use of the Bluenotes name, it became credited as a Young solo album.

== "This Note's for You" music video ==
The music video for the title track was directed by Julien Temple and written by Charlie Coffey. The title itself mocks Budweiser's "This Bud's for You" ad campaign. The video parodied corporate rock and the pretensions of advertising, and was patterned after a series of Michelob ads that featured contemporary rock artists such as Eric Clapton, Genesis, and Steve Winwood. The video also featured parodic inserts from commercials featuring impersonators of Whitney Houston and Michael Jackson (whose hair catches fire), as well as popular characters such as a Spuds McKenzie lookalike and models in the Calvin Klein Obsession commercial.

"This Note's for You" was initially banned by MTV after legal threats from Michael Jackson's attorneys, although Canadian music channel MuchMusic ran it immediately. After it was a hit on MuchMusic, MTV reconsidered their decision and put it into heavy rotation, finally giving it the MTV Video Music Award for Best Video of the Year for 1989. It was nominated for a Grammy in the category of "Best Concept Video" of 1989 but lost to "Weird Al" Yankovic's "Fat", a spoof of Michael Jackson's "Bad".

When NME challenged David Lee Roth about his own corporate sponsorship (by Toshiba), citing "This Note's for You", the singer responded: "That's just hippy bullshit from the '60s. If your message is not strong enough to transcend a soda-pop commercial, you got problems!"

== Artwork ==
The cover of this album is reportedly a photo taken in the back lane of the 200 block of Main Street Winnipeg, which housed the Blue Note Cafe. Young was known to play unannounced in the Blue Note Cafe while in Winnipeg.

== Other recordings with the Bluenotes ==
Young toured with the Bluenotes band (later renamed to Ten Men Workin' for the legal reasons noted above) throughout 1988, playing predominantly new material, including a number of unreleased songs. A live album from the tour, titled Bluenote Café, was planned at the time as a follow-up to the studio album but got shelved, although two songs appeared on compilation Lucky Thirteen in 1993; it was eventually released in 2015 as volume 11 of Young's Archive Performance Series.

Young also did more studio sessions with the band in 1988; three known songs that were recorded are "Crime in the City (Sixty to Zero Part I)", "Someday" (both songs would be included on next year's Freedom) and "Ordinary People", an 18-minute song described as "'Cortez the Killer' with horns", which finally saw its release on Young's 2007 studio album, Chrome Dreams II. The horn section from the Bluenotes also plays on the Stephen Stills song "That Girl" from the Crosby, Stills, Nash & Young album American Dream (1988).

== Track listing ==
All tracks are written by Neil Young.

No.	Title	Length
1.	"Ten Men Workin'"	6:28
2.	"This Note's for You"	2:05
3.	"Coupe de Ville"	4:18
4.	"Life in the City"	3:13
5.	"Twilight"	5:54
6.	"Married Man"	2:38
7.	"Sunny Inside"	2:36
8.	"Can't Believe Your Lyin'"	2:58
9.	"Hey Hey"	3:05
10.	"One Thing"	6:02

== Personnel ==
- Neil Young – vocals, guitar, production

The Bluenotes

- Chad Cromwell – drums
- Rick "The Bass Player" Rosas – bass
- Frank "Poncho" Sampedro – keyboards
- Steve Lawrence – lead tenor saxophone
- Ben Keith – alto saxophone
- Larry Cragg – baritone saxophone
- Claude Cailliet – trombone
- John Fumo – trumpet on "Can't Believe Your Lyin'"
- Tom Bray – trumpet on "Coupe de Ville"

with:

- George Whitsell – bass on "One Thing"
- Ralph Molina – drums on "One Thing"
- Steve Onuska – tambourine on "One Thing"

Additional roles

- Niko Bolas – production, recording, mixing
- Bob Scott, Christine Cragg – art design
- Elliot Roberts – direction
- Tim Mulligan, Gary Long, Brent Walton, Tim McColm, Duane Seykora – engineering
- Doug Sax – mastering

== Charts ==
Chart performance for This Note's for You
Chart (1988)	Peak position
Australian Albums (ARIA)	45
Canada Top Albums/CDs (RPM)	26
Dutch Albums (Album Top 100)	50
New Zealand Albums (RMNZ)	36
Swedish Albums (Sverigetopplistan)	22
UK Albums (Official Charts)	56
US Billboard 200	61
