= Neil Young Trunk Show =

2009 film by Jonathan Demme

- Directed by: Jonathan Demme
- Produced by: Jonathan Demme
- Starring: Neil Young
- Edited by: Glenn Allen
- Music by: Neil Young
- Production companies: Tower Theater, Upper Darby, Pennsylvania
- Distributed by: Shakey Pictures
- Release date: 2009
- Running time: 82 minutes
- Country: United States
- Language: English

Neil Young Trunk Show is a 2009 documentary and concert film by Jonathan Demme, featuring Neil Young. It is, along with Neil Young: Heart of Gold (2006) and Neil Young Journeys (2012), part of a Neil Young trilogy created by Demme.

== Songs in the film ==
All songs are written by Young, except where otherwise noted.

- "Sad Movies"
- "Harvest"
- "Cinnamon Girl"
- "Oh, Lonesome Me" - Written by Don Gibson
- "Kansas"
- "Mexico"
- "Spirit Road"
- "No Hidden Path"
- "Ambulance Blues"
- "Mellow My Mind"
- "The Believer"
- "Like A Hurricane"
- "Cowgirl In The Sand"
- "The Sultan"
