= Neil Young: Heart of Gold =

- Theatrical release poster
- Directed by: Jonathan Demme
- Written by: Jace Anderson; Adam Gierasch
- Produced by: Ilona Herzberg
- Starring: Neil Young; Emmylou Harris; Ben Keith; Grant Boatwright
- Cinematography: Ellen Kuras
- Edited by: Andy Keir
- Music by: Neil Young; Ian Tyson
- Production companies: Shangri-La Entertainment; Reprise Records; Playtone; Clinica Estetico; Shakey Pictures
- Distributed by: Paramount Classics
- Release date: February 10, 2006
- Running time: 104 minutes
- Country: United States
- Language: English
- Box office: $2.2 million

Neil Young: Heart of Gold is a 2006 American documentary/concert film by Jonathan Demme, featuring the Canadian/American singer and songwriter Neil Young. It documents Young's premiere of his songs from his album Prairie Wind at Ryman Auditorium.

The film was produced in the summer of 2005 in Nashville, Tennessee. It premiered at the 2006 Sundance Film Festival, and was released theatrically on 10 February 2006.

== Overview ==
The film opens with interviews with Young and most of his band, which includes Emmylou Harris, Young's then-wife Pegi Young, steel guitarist Ben Keith, and keyboardist Spooner Oldham. They and the other band members describe the concert and the making of Prairie Wind. The recording of the album and the filming of the concert occurred just before and after Young's surgery to correct a cerebral aneurysm, and just a few months after the death of Young's father Scott Young.

The first half of the concert consists entirely of songs from Prairie Wind, and the second half consists of acoustic songs from throughout Young's career. Young describes the inspiration behind several of his songs.

== Songs in the film ==
The performance captured in Neil Young: Heart of Gold was filmed over two nights on August 18 and 19 2005 at Ryman Auditorium in Nashville, Tennessee. Recorded by Chad Halley and David Hewitt on Remote Recording's Silver Truck. In order to increase the length of the concert film, director Jonathan Demme asked Neil Young to supplement the songs from Prairie Wind with an encore set of older songs. Young agreed and selected songs that he had previously recorded in Nashville. The two sets are set apart by a costume change for the musicians and a different backdrop on the stage.

All songs are written by Young, except where otherwise noted.

=== Prairie Wind set ===
- "The Painter"
- "No Wonder"
- "Falling Off the Face of the Earth"
- "Far From Home" – Young introduces the song by telling a story about his father giving him an Arthur Godfrey ukulele when he was about seven years old and working on a chicken farm.
- "It's a Dream"
- "Prairie Wind"
- "Here for You" - from the 'empty nester genre'
- "This Old Guitar" – duet with Emmylou Harris; Young notes that he is playing a guitar (a Martin D-28) once owned by Hank Williams.
- "When God Made Me" – features Young playing piano, backed by the Fisk University Jubilee Singers and Spooner Oldham on organ.

=== Encore set ===
- "I Am a Child"
- "Harvest Moon"
- "Heart of Gold"
- "Old Man" - introduced with Young explaining the inspiration for the song being "an old gentleman named Louis Avila," who was the caretaker of the ranch Young purchased when he first became successful.
- "The Needle and the Damage Done"
- "Old King" – features Young on six-string banjo, accompanied by Emmylou Harris on rhythm guitar and harmony vocals.
- "Comes a Time" – dedicated to Nicolette Larson who sang on Young's Comes a Time album; features the backing singers and crew lined up across the front of the stage playing acoustic guitars.
- "Four Strong Winds" – written by Ian Tyson.
- "One of These Days"
- "The Old Laughing Lady" – over the closing credits; Young on solo acoustic guitar, alone on stage in a chair, playing to an empty auditorium.

=== DVD special features ===
- "He Was the King" – A bonus song from Prairie Wind, not included in the film.
- "The Needle and the Damage Done" – 1971 performance from The Johnny Cash Show.

== Performers ==
- Grant Boatwright – harmony vocals, acoustic guitar, electric guitar (Old Black)
- Larry Cragg – guitar technician, 12-string guitar, six-string banjo, broom
- Anthony Crawford – acoustic guitar, harmony vocals
- Chad Cromwell – drums, percussion
- Diana DeWitt – harmony vocals, acoustic guitar, autoharp
- Clinton Gregory – fiddle, backing vocals
- Emmylou Harris – harmony vocals, rhythm guitar
- Karl T. Himmel – drums, percussion
- Ben Keith – pedal steel guitar, lap steel guitar, dobro, vibraphone
- The Memphis Horns:
  - Wayne Jackson – trumpet
  - Tom McGinley – baritone saxophone
  - Jimmy Sharp – trombone
- Spooner Oldham – Hammond B3 organ, piano, vibraphone
- Gary W. Pigg – harmony vocals, acoustic guitar
- Rick Rosas – bass guitar
- Neil Young – vocals, acoustic guitar, six-string banjo, piano
- Pegi Young – harmony vocals, acoustic guitar
- Fisk University Jubilee Singers
- Nashville String Machine

== Scenic art ==
Michael Zansky created scenic art in Neil Young: Heart of Gold.

== Reception ==
The film had a limited release to the general public, but came to popular critical acclaim with an 85% average on Metacritic and a 91% Fresh rating average on Rotten Tomatoes.
