= Freedom (Neil Young album) =

Studio album by Neil Young
- Released: October 2, 1989
- Recorded: July 25, 1988 – July 10, 1989
- Venues: Jones Beach, New York (track 1)
- Studios: Broken Arrow Ranch, Woodside, California; The Hit Factory, New York City (tracks 3, 5, 8)
- Genres: Heartland rock; hard rock
- Length: 61:11
- Label: Reprise
- Producers: Neil Young; Niko Bolas

Neil Young chronology
Eldorado (1989)	Freedom (1989)	Ragged Glory (1990)

Singles from Freedom
- 1. "Rockin' in the Free World (edited)" / "Rockin' in the Free World (live acoustic)" Released: November 14, 1989

Freedom is the nineteenth studio album by Canadian-American musician Neil Young. Released on October 2, 1989. Freedom represented a critical and commercial comeback for Young, after a string of poorly received projects in the 1980s.

== Writing ==
The songs on Freedom were written over the span of more than a decade. "Too Far Gone" dates to the Zuma era, and would be performed regularly in concert in 1976. "The Ways of Love" was written in the mid-1970s, attempted for Comes a Time, and first performed live during the May 1978 Boarding House concerts for Rust Never Sleeps. "Eldorado" would first appear as "Road of Plenty" in concert in 1986. Young would rehearse the song with Buffalo Springfield during a brief attempt at a reunion that year. "Someday", "Wrecking Ball" and "Hangin' on a Limb" appear on Summer Songs, a 1987 collection of solo performances of eight new songs that Young would release on his website on Christmas Day, 2021.

"Crime in the City" would first be performed and recorded with twelve verses as "Sixty to Zero". He wrote the song in 1988 while sailing in the Pacific:

I was in the middle of the ocean. I was sailboat sailing to Hawaii. I'd been out at sea almost 10 days - about halfway over there. I hadn't seen anybody for about 8 days - no planes, no other boats - just the horizon. So I was pretty spacey out there by then. In one night I wrote three songs: "Ordinary People", "Sixty To Zero" and "Days That Used To Be".

"Don't Cry" was inspired by a relationship of Niko Bolas' that had fallen apart. The music was influenced by Roy Orbison. According to Young in a November 1990 Vox interview with Nick Kent:

I've always put a piece of Roy Orbison on every album I've made. His influence is on so many of my songs. I even had his photograph on the sleeve of Tonight's The Night for no reason, really. Just recognizing his presence. There's a big Orbison tribute song on Eldorado called Don't Cry. That's totally me under the Roy Orbison spell. When I wrote it and recorded it I was thinking 'Roy Orbison meets trash metal'.

"Rockin' in the Free World" originates with a phrase Young borrowed from guitarist Poncho Sampedro. Sampedro would explain in a 2013 interview for Rolling Stone:

We were on the road with the Lost Dogs in 1989. I was riding on Neil's bus at the time. I was his cook on the bus, so we were hanging out 24/7. All this stuff was going down with the Ayatollah. I don’t know if you remember that footage of them passing the casket along over the heads of thousand and thousands of people. There was a lot of 'Hate America' demonstrations and we were supposed to do this exchange. We were going to Russia for the first time. It was a cultural exchange. They were getting us in exchange for the Russian Ballet. And it just fell through. Neil was like, 'Damn, I really wanted to go.' I said, 'Me too. I guess we’ll have to keep on rockin’ in the free world.' He was like, 'Wow, that’s a cool line.' Then I said it again later and he said, 'That’s a really good phrase. I wanna use it.' He told me he was going to use it. The next day he came up to me and told me to check out this lyric sheet. I only questioned one of them. I think it was 'Keep Hope Alive' or something. He said, 'No, no, no. That’s a good one.' We just started singing it and he taught me the harmony part. That night we played it in Seattle. It was this cool theater. We didn’t even rehearse it with the band. I was telling the chords to [bassist] Rick Rosas as we went along.

== Recording ==
The first songs recorded for the album were "Someday" and "Crime in the City". Young recorded the songs at his home studio at Broken Arrow Ranch in late July 1988, in between sessions for the CSNY album American Dream The sessions took place during a break in the tour supporting This Note's for You, and feature performers from his touring band. "Ordinary People" from Chrome Dreams II was also recorded at this time, as was a driving, electric version of "Crime in the City". Both the electric version and the acoustic album version were recorded as "Sixty to Zero" with all verses. The album take was later edited to remove the first half of the verses. Young explained the edit in a contemporary interview for Dutch radio: "It's too long as one thing. It's meant to stand by itself, not to be played with anything else. If I play the long version in concert, it's too overpowering. If you can imagine listening to anything for 18 minutes, it disturbs the flow. It's too much of the same thing so I do the short version."

After the completion of the Bluenotes tour in December 1988, Young booked time at the Hit Factory in Times Square, New York with bassist Rick Rosas and drummer Chad Cromwell, the rhythm section from the previous tour. Young would dub the trio "Young and the Restless", a play on the name of the long running soap opera. During the sessions, Young would pursue the loudest sound possible by routing his guitar "Old Black" through different combinations of amps. According to producer and sound engineer Niko Bolas, the loudness was in response to the saccharine production of American Dream: "That record came about as a direct result of doing CSNY. Neil was so pissed off at having to do a record that he didn’t want to do, with pretty songs that he fuckin’ hated, that he just retaliated." The trio recorded the songs "Heavy Love", "Wrecking Ball", "Cocaine Eyes", "Don't Cry", "On Broadway", "Eldorado" and "Boxcar". Young sequenced an early version of Freedom from these songs plus the earlier "Someday" and "Crime in the City" with a proposed title of Times Square. Instead of releasing the album, Young embarked on a tour of Australia and then Japan with the Restless plus Ben Keith and Poncho Sampedro. He would dub this band The Lost Dogs. To promote the tour, Young released a five-song EP of the Hit Factory songs, Eldorado. The release was limited to Australia and Japan.

Though the Times Square tracks would still form the core of the album, Young would continue to incorporate more material. At his ranch in March 1989, Young would record new songs "No More" and "Rockin' in the Free World" and revisit "Too Far Gone" and "The Ways of Love" from the 1970s. In July, he would round out the album by recording "Hanging on a Limb" and overdub vocals to "The Ways of Love" with Linda Ronstadt. A live acoustic take of "Rockin' in the Free World" from Jones Beach from June would open the album. "Rockin' in the Free World" became one of Young's signature songs and a live favorite, and bookends the album in acoustic and electric variants, a stylistic choice previously featured on Rust Never Sleeps. Young explains the wide array of music in the album thus: "I knew that I wanted to make a real album that expressed how I felt. I just wanted to make a Neil Young record per se. Something that was just me, where there was no persona, no image, no distinctive character like the Bluenotes guy or the guy in Everybody's Rockin'. It's the first time I've felt like doing an album like this in years." Although he originally planned to release a purely electric rock album ("nothing but abrasiveness from beginning to end"), Young says the final product is "almost like listening to the radio - it keeps changing and going from one thing to another."

== Saturday Night Live performance ==
Young would perform the songs "Rockin' in the Free World", "The Needle and the Damage Done" and "No More" live in September 1989 for the television show Saturday Night Live. For the performance, Young played with Poncho Sampedro, Charley Drayton and Steve Jordan. In concert, Young would typically play "Rockin' in the Free World" well into the set, when the band's energy is at a high. To achieve the same level of energy, Young worked out with his trainer 30 minutes prior to the performance. He explained to author Jimmy McDonough: "I had to pretend I wasn't there. I had a dressing room, a little place with an amp in it, in another part of the building. And I walked from there into Saturday Night Live—and then left. I developed a whole new technique for television. I had my trainer, and we just lifted weights and I did calisthenics to get my blood to the level it would be at after performing for an hour and twenty-five minutes—which is usually how long I'd be onstage by the time I did that song. To perform that song the way it’s supposed to be performed, you have to be at peak blood level."

Comedian Dennis Miller would later say that "Rockin' in the Free World" was the single greatest performance on the show in its history.

== Reception ==
Professional ratings
Review scores
Source	Rating
AllMusic	4.5/5 stars
The Encyclopedia of Popular Music	4/5 stars
The Great Rock Discography	7/10
MusicHound Rock	3.5/5
NME	9/10
Rolling Stone	5/5 stars
The Rolling Stone Album Guide	4/5 stars
Spin Alternative Record Guide	9/10
The Village Voice	A

Freedom has received mainly positive reviews, especially in comparison to the rest of Young's '80s work. AllMusic's William Ruhlmann explained that it "was the album Neil Young fans knew he was capable of making, but feared he would never make again." He also stated that "there were tracks that harked back to [his] acoustic-based, country-tinged albums." Robert Christgau, writing for The Village Voice, rated it an A. He declared that it contains a combination of "the folk ditties and rock galumph that made (Young) famous" and "the Nashvillisms and horn charts that made him infamous." He also said "it features a bunch of good stuff about a subject almost no rocker white or black has done much with--crack". David Fricke of Rolling Stone rated it five out of five stars. He called it "the sound of Neil Young, another decade on, looking back again in anger and dread" and that it is about "the illusion of freedom" and "Young's refusal to accept that as the last word on the subject." Fricke summed up the review by calling it "a harsh reminder that everything still comes with a price."

AllMusic reviewer Matthew Greenwald offered strong praise for the second track, "Crime in the City", calling it "undoubtedly the centerpiece of the album," "cinematic in scope" and "one of Neil Young's most accomplished works". In Glide Magazine, Doug Collette wrote that with Freedom, Young closed the 1980s "with an artistic statement even more emphatic than his contemporaries", the Rolling Stones' with Steel Wheels, and comparable to Bob Dylan's Oh Mercy. Writing for Ultimate Classic Rock, Nick DeRiso called Freedom Young's "most varied, most topical, most complete work since the '70s". The album is ranked number 996 in All-Time Top 1000 Albums (3rd. edition, 2000).

== Track listing ==
All tracks are written by Neil Young, except where noted.

No.	Title	Writer(s)	Length
1.	"Rockin' in the Free World" (Live acoustic)		3:38
2.	"Crime in the City (Sixty to Zero Part I)"		8:45
3.	"Don't Cry"		4:14
4.	"Hangin' on a Limb"		4:18
5.	"Eldorado"		6:03
6.	"The Ways of Love"		4:29
7.	"Someday"		5:40
8.	"On Broadway"	Barry Mann, Cynthia Weil, Jerry Leiber, Mike Stoller	4:57
9.	"Wrecking Ball"		5:08
10.	"No More"		6:03
11.	"Too Far Gone"		2:47
12.	"Rockin' in the Free World" (Electric)		4:41

== Personnel ==
- Neil Young – vocals; acoustic guitar; electric guitar; harmonica; piano on 9
- Chad Cromwell – drums
- Rick "The Bass Player" Rosas – bass
- Frank "Poncho" Sampedro – guitar on 2, 5 (as "Poncho Villa"), 9, 12; keyboards on 5, 7; mandolin on 11; vocals on 12
- Ben Keith – alto saxophone on 2, 7; pedal steel guitar on 2, 6, 11; keyboards on 10, 12; vocals on 11

Additional personnel

- Linda Ronstadt – vocals on 4, 6
- Tony Marsico – bass on 10
- Steve Lawrence – tenor saxophone on 2, 7
- Larry Cragg – baritone saxophone on 2, 7
- Claude Cailliet – trombone on 2, 7
- John Fumo – trumpet on 2, 7
- Tom Bray – trumpet on 2, 7

Production

- Neil Young – producer, mixing engineer
- Niko Bolas – producer, recording engineer except on tracks 1 4, mixing engineer except on tracks 1 4
- Tim Mulligan – digital engineer, recording engineer on 4
- Harry Sitam – senior technical engineer
- Dave Collins – digital editor
- Doug Sax – digital mastering engineer
- Dave Hewitt – recording engineer on 1, mixing engineer on 1

== Charts ==
Weekly charts

Chart (1989)	Peak position
Austrian Albums (Ö3 Austria)	29
Canada Top Albums/CDs (RPM)	16
Dutch Albums (Album Top 100)	30
German Albums (Offizielle Top 100)	40
Swedish Albums (Sverigetopplistan)	21
UK Albums (Official Charts)	17
US Billboard 200	35

=== Singles ===
Year	Single	Chart	Position
1989	"No More"	Billboard Mainstream Rock Tracks	7
1989	"Rockin' in the Free World" (Electric)	Billboard Mainstream Rock Tracks	2
1990	"Crime in the City" (Electric)	Billboard Mainstream Rock Tracks	34

== Certifications ==
Region	Certification	Certified units/sales
Canada (Music Canada)	Gold	50,000^{^}
United Kingdom (BPI)	Silver	60,000^{^}
United States (RIAA)	Gold	500,000^{^}
^{^} Shipments figures based on certification alone.
