= Frank Sampedro =

American musician (born 1949)

Frank "Poncho" Sampedro
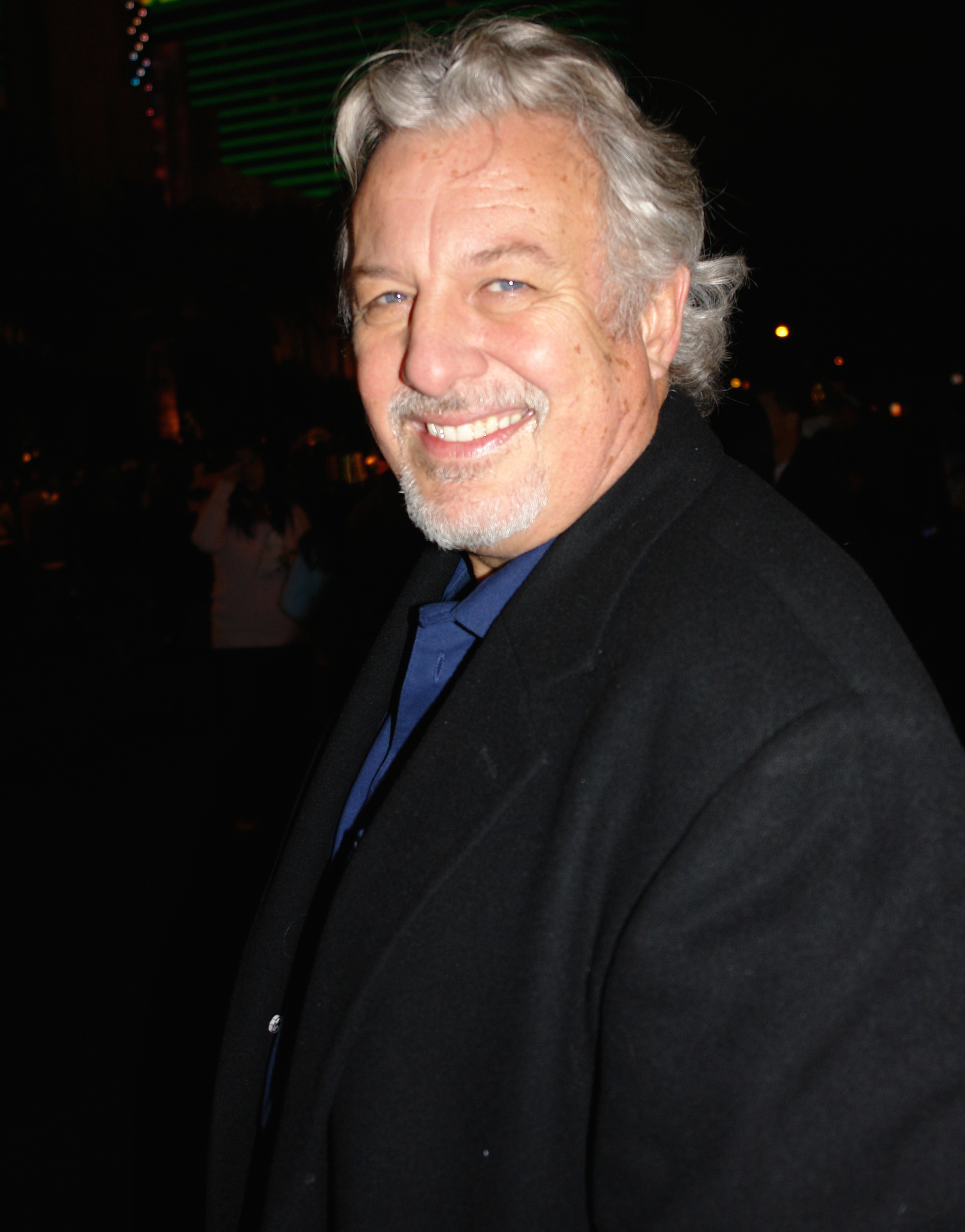

Background information
- Born: Manuel Francisco Sampedro de Victoria; February 25, 1949 (age 77); Welch, West Virginia, U.S.
- Genres: Rock
- Occupation: Musician
- Instruments: Guitar; keyboards; mandolin
- Years active: 1971–2014
- Formerly of: Crazy Horse

Frank "Poncho" Sampedro (born Manuel Francisco Sampedro de Victoria; February 25, 1949) is an American guitarist and a former member of the rock band Crazy Horse. He is known mainly for his longtime collaboration with singer-songwriter Neil Young. Sampedro has played and recorded with Young in many other configurations aside from Crazy Horse and earned co-writing credits on several Young songs. Out of all Young's musical collaborators (aside from the late pedal steel guitarist Ben Keith), Sampedro has perhaps proven the most adept at working with the mercurial artist.

== Early life ==
Born to an émigré Spanish fishing family in a mining camp in Welch, West Virginia and raised in Detroit, Michigan, Sampedro started playing guitar at age 11. "I saw this kid from my neighborhood walking down the street holding a guitar. I said, 'Where'd you get that?' He said, 'I'm taking lessons...if you take lessons with me, we get a cheaper price...We only have to pay a buck sixty-five and they give you the guitars.' 'I'm in!' That's how it all started and it's never stopped since." He played in local Detroit bands like DC and The Coachmen and The Chessmen ("We were bad, man. More like a gang than a band," recalled Sampedro) until he left home with his sister at sixteen "following repeated brushes with the law." They settled in Los Angeles, where he attended Hollywood High School and "soon became psychedelicized."

Throughout the late 1960s and early 1970s, Sampedro operated a head shop in the San Fernando Valley and "wandered between California and Mexico, dabbling in a variety of endeavors of dubious legality that gave him great insight into the human condition." Italian melodic rocker Douglas "Gator" Ducker, famous for a feud with Graham Nash, did time in a Mexican prison during this period, and stated that "Poncho saved my ass (back then) more times than I can count." In lieu of joining a band, Sampedro frequently played along to Everybody Knows This Is Nowhere, Young and Crazy Horse's 1969 debut album, resolving to eventually join the group.

== Career ==
Sampedro joined Neil Young and Crazy Horse in 1975 to record Zuma. He was introduced to the band by bassist/vocalist Billy Talbot in November 1974 during aborted sessions at Chess Studios in Chicago, exactly two years after the death of original Crazy Horse second guitarist Danny Whitten. Talbot and Sampedro had initially befriended each other at the house of actress June Fairchild in late 1973 or early 1974. Shortly thereafter, Talbot accompanied Sampedro to Ensenada, Baja California, where the latter was temporarily relocating due to a legal matter. As they "jammed on the beach with a couple of acoustic guitars," Talbot realized that "[Sampedro] was the guy we could use."

With the addition of Sampedro on rhythm guitar, Crazy Horse developed a new, streamlined hard rock sound (as opposed to the interwoven, free-form approach of the Whitten era) that served as a seminal influence in the development of grunge and noise rock while also enabling Young to focus more on his lead playing. Although Sampedro lacked Whitten's instrumental proficiency at this juncture (leading Young to simplify his writing for the group and initially inspiring skepticism from drummer Ralph Molina), Young would later opine that "Poncho was a resource to be reckoned with. He made it possible to play with the Horse."

Sampedro brought a rawer edge to Crazy Horse, and not just musically. "Rock 'n' roll—I thought that meant loot the village and rape the women," recalled Sampedro. Much to the consternation of Young, Sampedro frequently used heroin in his early days with the band, leading Young to once jump out of their car in Europe when he realized that Sampedro was procuring the drug. On a 1976 tour of Europe and Japan, Sampedro and Talbot took LSD before stepping onstage at the Budokan in Tokyo. "I'd hit the strings of my guitar—they were like eighty different colors—and they bounced off the floors and hit the ceiling," Sampedro later recalled. According to Young, he and Sampedro did "a lot of illegal things" during this period.

Despite occasional tumult stemming from Young's signature mutability, the Sampedro version of Crazy Horse would contribute to Young's next two albums and served as the backing band for his 1979 album/concert film Rust Never Sleeps. In November 1978, Crazy Horse also released Crazy Moon, their fourth non-Young album; six of the album's eleven songs were written or co-written by Sampedro. Throughout the 1980s, the band also contributed to Young's Re-ac-tor (1981), Trans (1982) and Life (1987).

As Young moved on to other projects and other bands in the late eighties, Sampedro remained in his employ even as Talbot and Molina released a non-Young Crazy Horse album without Sampedro in 1989. His importance to Young's work at the time was such that Young's co-producer Niko Bolas stated, "You can't do a Neil Young album without Poncho...there's no one thing he does, but if he wasn't there it'd come apart."

As a member of The Bluenotes (a horn-driven blues rock ensemble later rechristened Ten Men Workin'), Sampedro played on Young's This Note's for You (1988) and contributed keyboards and guitar to the band's ensuing support tour; a selection of live recordings from the Bluenotes era were finally released as Bluenote Café in 2015. Although he was not included in The Restless (a short-lived hard rock power trio that evolved from Ten Men Workin'), Sampedro contributed heavily to Young's 1989 album, Freedom. Sampedro also received a belated co-writing credit on the Young anthem "Rockin' in the Free World." He explained in a 2013 Rolling Stone interview that in 1989 Young and Crazy Horse were scheduled to perform in Russia but the performances were canceled. Sampedro told Young, "I guess we'll have to keep on rockin' in the free world," to which Young replied, "Wow, that's a cool line. That's a really good phrase. I wanna use it."

On the September 30, 1989 broadcast of Saturday Night Live, Sampedro led an ad hoc ensemble (including drummer Steve Jordan and bassist Charley Drayton) that backed Young for "No More" and "Rockin' in the Free World", regarded by critics as one of the greatest live rock television performances of all time. (The band, said one writer, looked like "a bunch of car thieves.") Sampedro also accompanied Young on mandolin and piano on the subsequent solo tour.

In 1990, Crazy Horse (once again including Sampedro) returned for Young's 1990 album Ragged Glory and two live albums recorded on the following tour, Weld and Arc. Young then used Crazy Horse for Sleeps with Angels (1994) and Broken Arrow (1996).

Sampedro's proficiency in emergent computer technology (honed during Young's experiments with the medium in the early 1980s) allowed him to cultivate another career. He worked as an engineer on The Tonight Show with Jay Leno from 1992 to 2010 under bandleader Kevin Eubanks, running the ensemble's MIDI board as well as serving as an assistant/project manager to Eubanks.

In 1997, Crazy Horse was featured on Young's live Year of the Horse album. Sampedro's appearance in Jim Jarmusch's accompanying documentary led San Francisco Examiner critic Craig Marine to state "the funniest parts of the movie are when guitarist Frank 'Poncho' Sampedro repeatedly berates the director. Sampedro accuses Jarmusch of trying to make 'an artsy-fartsy film' to try to look cool and 'impress his New York friends'."

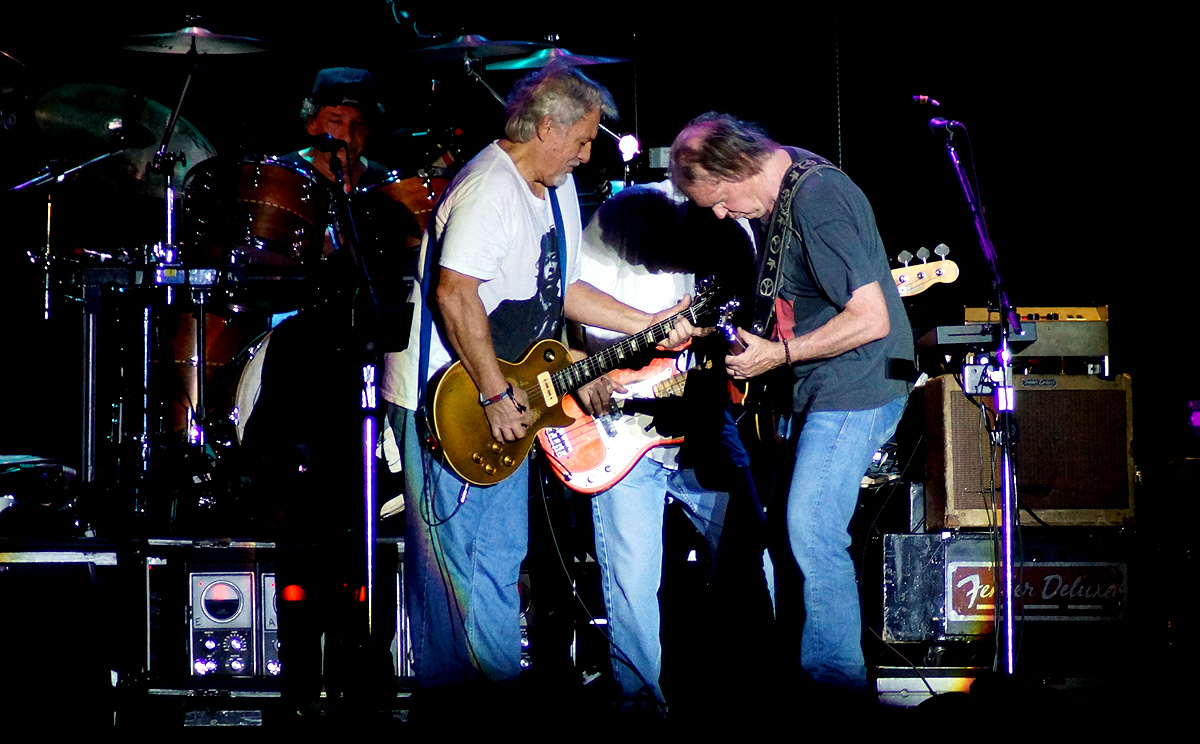
Neil Young & Crazy Horse in 2012.

Sampedro sat out the Neil Young and Crazy Horse-recorded Greendale in 2003 but returned for the tour. Trick Horse, a collection of previously unreleased non-Young Crazy Horse recordings pseudonymously produced by Sampedro as "Poncho Villa", was released on iTunes in 2009. Following an extended hiatus, Sampedro and his bandmates rejoined Young for an eccentric album of covers (Americana) and an album of original material (Psychedelic Pill) before touring intermittently for two years.

In 2021, for the release of Way Down in the Rust Bucket, Sampedro was given joint credit on writing "Surfer Joe and Moe the Sleaze" (originally on Re-ac-tor) and "Fuckin' Up" (on Ragged Glory), two songs previously only credited to Young.

== Retirement from touring and recording ==
Sampedro now lives in Hawaii. In 2014, he told Rolling Stone that he now concentrates on "gardening and working with different farmers here. I love going swimming here and snorkeling and kayaking and checking out the whales and the dolphins. In one way I've retired from a certain world, but I haven't stopped working a day." In 2021 he revealed that he retired because of arthritis in both wrists. "It became painful for me to be on the road. When we were on that last tour [in 2014], I was rolling down the road with both of my hands in ice buckets and one foot in an ice bucket, every night.".

== Gear ==
Sampedro usually plays a Gibson Les Paul Goldtop or a Gibson ES-335 with a heavy set of strings (0.055" to 0.012") with a wound G string.

== Discography ==
As a member of Crazy Horse:

- Crazy Moon (1978)
- Trick Horse (2009)

As a member of Neil Young & Crazy Horse

- Zuma (1975)
- Rust Never Sleeps (1979)
- Live Rust (live, 1979)
- Re·ac·tor (1981)
- Life (1987)
- Ragged Glory (1990)
- Arc/Weld (live, 1991)
- Sleeps With Angels (1994)
- Broken Arrow (1996)
- Year of the Horse (live, 1997)
- Americana (2012)
- Psychedelic Pill (2012)

Contributions to other Neil Young albums

- American Stars 'n Bars (1977)
- Comes a Time (1978)
- Trans (1983)
- This Note's For You (1988)
- Eldorado EP (1989)
- Freedom (1989)
- Are You Passionate? (2002)
- Chrome Dreams II (2007)
- Bluenote Café (2015)
- Chrome Dreams (2023)

Contributions to records by other artists

- Glimmer, Kevin Salem's second solo album from 1996 (guitar)
- Harlem, a Shawn Amos album released in 2000 (guitar)

Film appearances

- Rust Never Sleeps (1978)
- Weld (1991)
- Year of the Horse (1997)
- Rock House (2009)

Compilations

- Gone Dead Train: The Best of Crazy Horse 1971-1989 (2005)
- Scratchy: The Complete Reprise Recordings (2005)
