= Rick Rosas =

American musician (1949–2014)

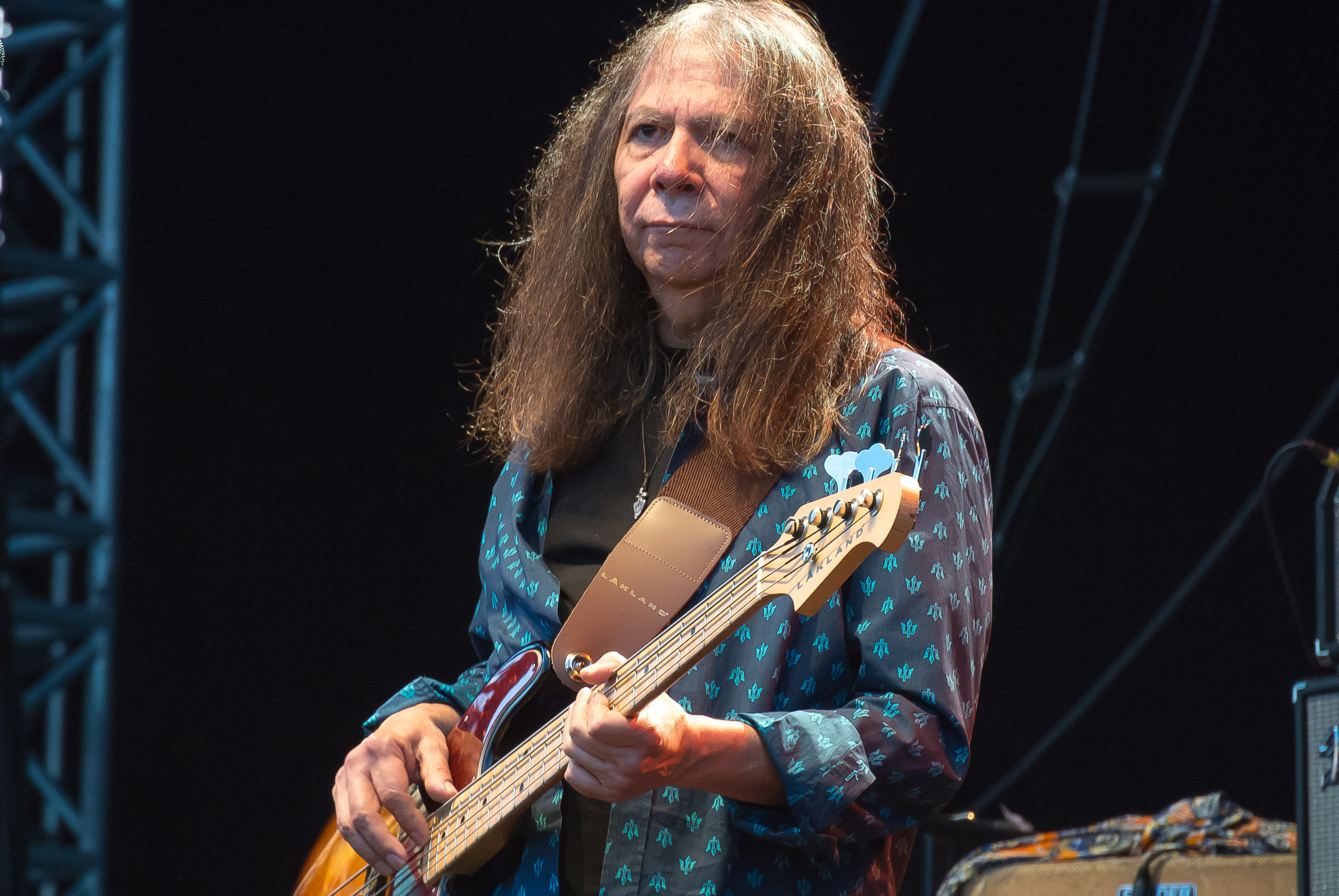
- Rosas performing with Neil Young and Crazy Horse in July 2014

Background information
- Born: September 10, 1949; East Los Angeles, California, U.S.
- Died: November 6, 2014 (aged 65) Los Angeles, California, U.S.
- Occupation: Musician
- Instrument: Bass guitar
- Website: rickrosas.com/Rick_Rosas/RTBP.html

Rick "Rick the Bass Player" Rosas (September 10, 1949 – November 6, 2014) was an American musician, and one of the most sought after studio session musicians in Los Angeles. Though largely known for his long collaboration with Neil Young, throughout his career he also played with Joe Walsh, Crosby, Stills, Nash & Young, Jerry Lee Lewis, Johnny Rivers, Ron Wood, Etta James, and the short-lived reunion of the Buffalo Springfield, among others. He performed as a bass player with The Flash in Jonathan Demme's 2015 film Ricki and the Flash. The band was composed of guitarist Rick Springfield, drummer Joe Vitale, and keyboardist Bernie Worrell, backing up Meryl Streep, as "Ricki", on vocals and guitar.

In 2014, Rosas joined Neil Young and Crazy Horse on their European tour, following Billy Talbot's inability to tour due to a stroke. This makes Rosas the only bassist to have played with three of Young's major bands, Buffalo Springfield, Crosby, Stills, Nash & Young, and Crazy Horse.

== Life and career ==
Rosas was born in East Los Angeles, California, to Anne and Ralph Rosas. Growing up in East Los Angeles, he listened to Elvis and the Everly Brothers. His first band was Mark & the Escorts, eventually recording an album for A&M Records as Tango.

He met Joe Walsh through drummer Joe Vitale in the early 80s and played on Walsh's 1985 album The Confessor. He also toured with Dan Fogelberg in 1985. In December 1986, the Walsh band joined Albert Collins and Etta James for a Jazzvisions taping called “Jump the Blues Away.”

Rosas met Neil Young at the Farm Aid III benefit and Young was impressed with the bass player's musical skill as well as his soft-spoken, laid back manner, and invited him to join his new horn-driven big band, the Bluenotes. With this band, Young recorded the album, This Note's For You. Rosas appeared in the video of the title track that was initially banned by MTV. When it became a hit on other music video outlets, MTV reversed itself and put the video in rotation. It won the MTV Video Music Award for Best Video of the Year for 1989.

After disbanding the Bluenotes, Young retained Rosas for a power group that recorded an EP, Eldorado. It was only released in Japan and Australia, to coincide with their Young & the Restless Far East Tour in early 1989. Rosas played a throbbing bass line on the rocker, "Rockin' in the Free World" which appeared on 1989's Freedom. Young invited Rosas to play on Prairie Wind in 2005. He also appeared in the album-release concert movie filmed at the Grand Ole Opry House, Heart of Gold. He would play on Young's next album, Living with War and the subsequent 2006 "Freedom of Speech" tour with Crosby, Stills, Nash & Young, that resulted in the film, CSNY/Déjà Vu and concert album, Déjà Vu Live.

Rick Rosas played on Young's next album, Chrome Dreams II which saw the release of the 1988 Bluenotes track "Ordinary People". He also provided backing vocals for the track "Dirty Old Man". He toured with Young's electric Band throughout America, Europe, and Asia for nearly three years, playing material from nearly every phase of Young's catalogue. A concert film, Neil Young Trunk Show, directed by Jonathan Demme, captured a 2007 performance in Philadelphia. In one scene Young praises Rosas’ musical abilities saying, "Rick can play anything!" Another Young album, Fork in the Road was recorded during the tour, which ended with a Hyde Park performance in London with Paul McCartney joining Young onstage for a cover of the Beatles' "A Day in the Life".

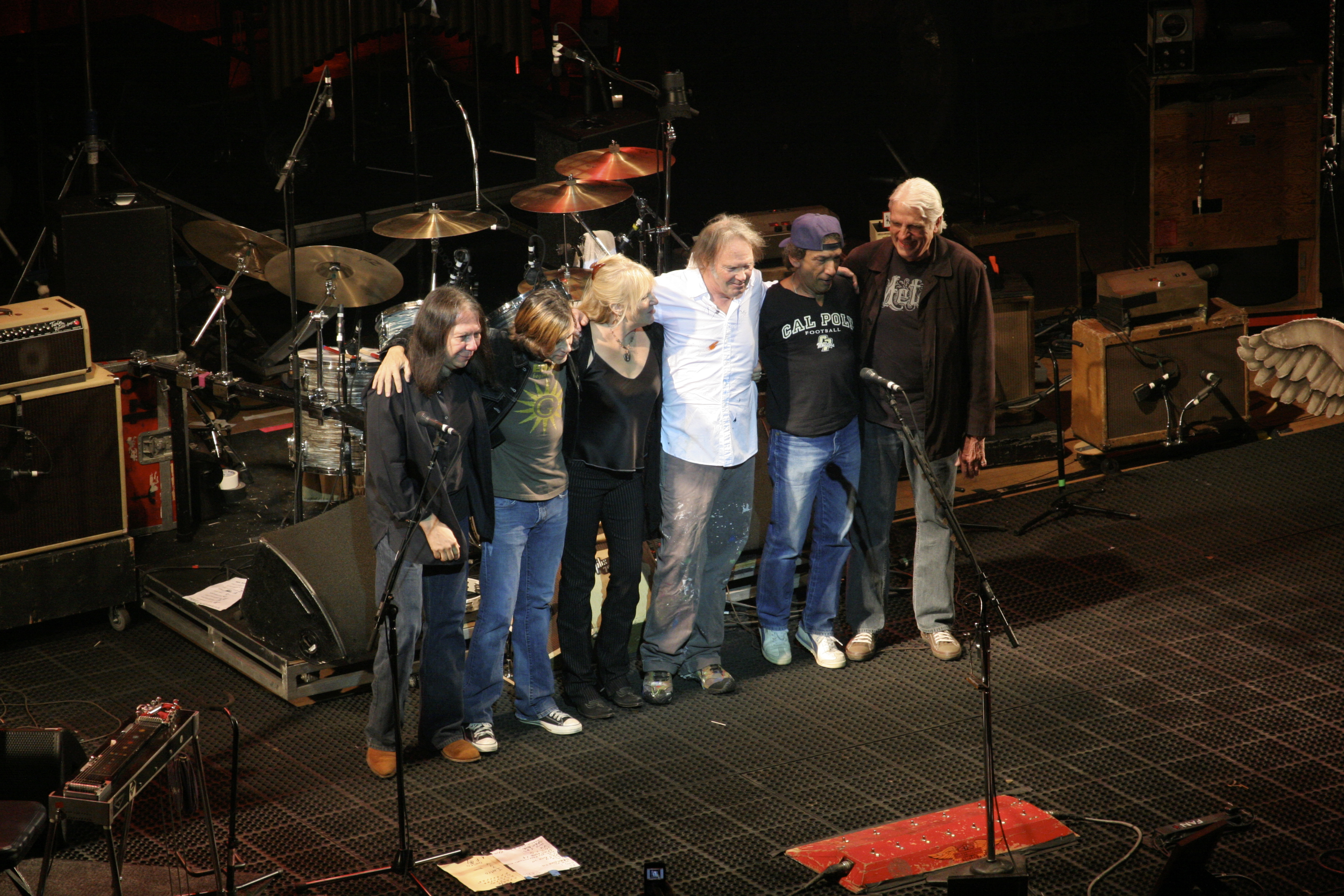
Rosas (outer left) with Young and his band in Toronto in 2007.

A year later Young invited Rosas to participate in the reunion of the Buffalo Springfield at that year's Bridge Concert. He and drummer Joe Vitale joined the remaining original members Young, Stephen Stills and Richie Furay. A six-show mini-tour followed in June 2011 with concerts in Oakland, Los Angeles, Santa Barbara and the Bonnaroo music festival but a planned fall tour was cancelled. While touring with Pegi Young & the Survivors, Rosas got the call from Neil Young to fill in for Crazy Horse bassist Billy Talbot, who had suffered a mild stroke a few weeks before their 2014 European Tour, making Rosas the only bassist to have played with Buffalo Springfield, Crosby, Stills, Nash & Young and Crazy Horse.

Throughout his career he remained a close personal friend of Joe Walsh, often appearing as a guest guitarist with Walsh when their schedules meshed, and appearing frequently in radio interviews in the various cities Walsh's tour would take them.

Rick Rosas died while at home, on November 6, 2014, in Agoura Hills, California from pulmonary hypertension with cardiac arrest. He was 65. The 2015 film by Jonathan Demme, Ricki and the Flash, in which he appears, is dedicated to him. Rosas was survived by his longtime partner/wife, Elizabeth.

== Discography ==
with Neil Young:

- 1988 This Note's for You
- 1989 Eldorado
- 1989 Freedom
- 2005 Prairie Wind
- 2006 Living with War
- 2007 Chrome Dreams II
- 2007 Goin' Home: A Tribute to Fats Domino
- 2008 Déjà Vu Live (w/ CSNY)
- 2009 Fork in the Road

with Johnny Rivers:

- 1998 Last Train to Memphis
- 2001 Back at the Whisky
- 2004 Reinvention Highway

with Jerry Lee Lewis:

- 2010 Mean Old Man

with Ron Wood:

- 2010 I Feel Like Playing

== Equipment ==
- bass guitar

== Filmography ==
- 2006 Heart of Gold
- 2008 CSNY/Déjà Vu
- 2010 Neil Young Trunk Show
- 2012 CRAZYTOWN A Visual Music Album
- 2015 Ricki and the Flash

== Video and television appearances ==
- 1986 Jazzvisions: "Jump the Blues Away" w/ Joe Walsh, Etta James and Albert King
- 1988 This Note's for You w/ Neil Young & the Bluenotes, dir. Julien Temple. Winner: MTV Music Award Video of the Year
- 1989 MTV Unplugged w/ Joe Walsh, Dr. John
- 2005 Late Night with Conan O'Brien w/ Neil Young five consecutive nights promoting Prairie Wind
- 2005 Saturday Night Live w/ Neil Young
- 2005 Farm Aid XX w/ Neil Young & the Prairie Wind Band
- 2006 Living with War w/ Neil Young recording sessions DVD
- 2006 Late Show with David Letterman w/Jerry Lee Lewis & Neil Young
- 2006 Farm Aid XXI w/ Neil Young & the Prairie Wind Band
- 2008 Farm Aid XXIII w/ Neil Young & His Electric Band
- 2009 Hard Rock Live w/Neil Young & His Electric Band and Paul McCartney
- 2009 Farm Aid w/ Neil Young & His Electric Band
- 2010 Last Man Standing video w/Jerry Lee Lewis
