= Jimmy McDonough =

American biographer

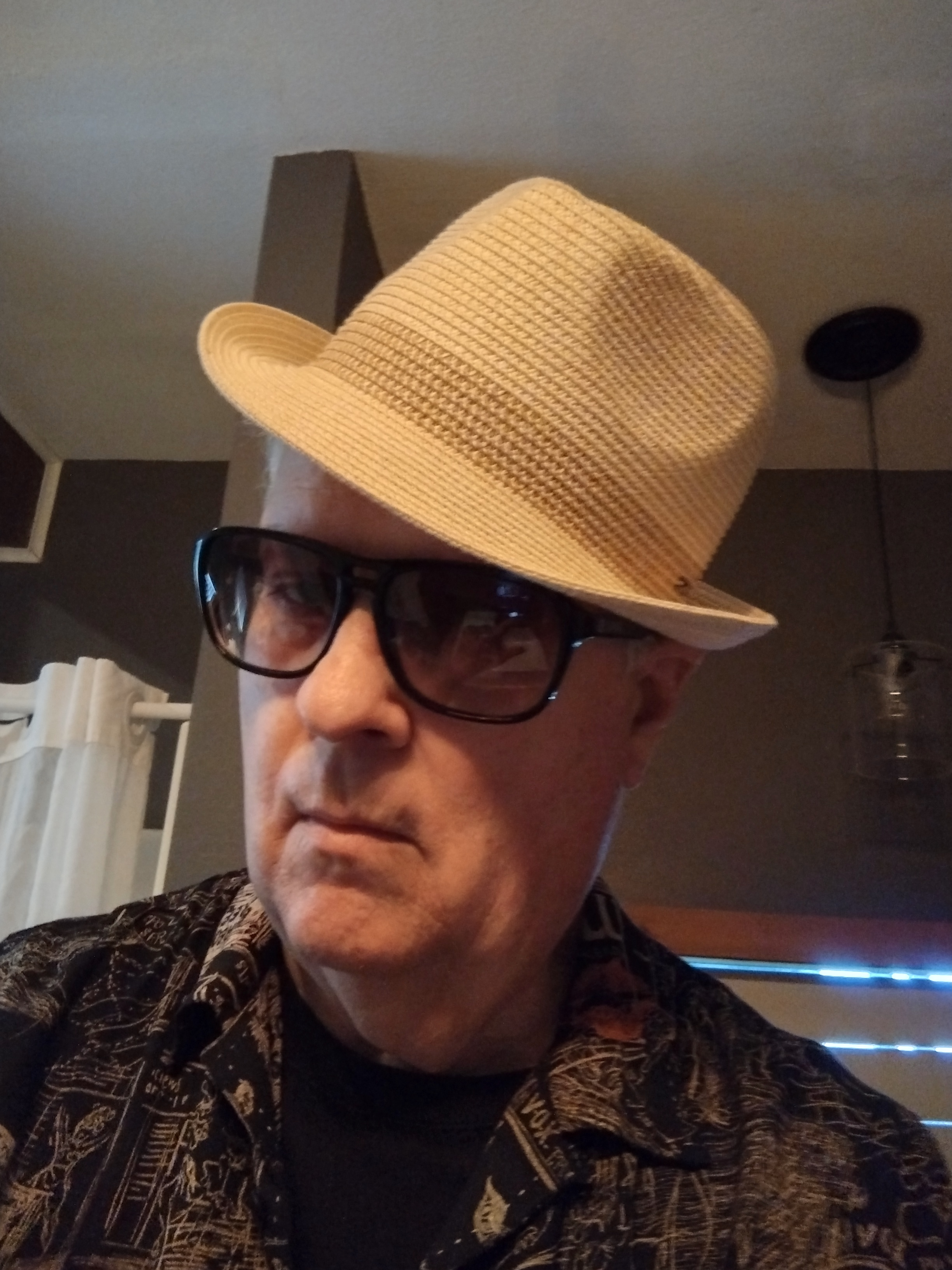

Jimmy McDonough is a biographer and journalist. He is best known for his biographies of Russ Meyer, Andy Milligan, Tammy Wynette, Al Green, and Neil Young. He is noted by critics for his remarkably exhaustive accounts and for his tendency to avoid romanticizing his subjects' lives. For this reason, he was described by The Times as "a literary Terminator".

== Career ==
Time's Richard Corliss declared his first published work The Ghastly One "a masterpiece" and John Waters has repeatedly named it one of his favorite books (this was actually McDonough's second effort; the first, Shakey: The Biography of Neil Young, had been held up by a lawsuit over the claim that Young had tried to prevent publication). Other reviewers decry the inclusion of his personal experience/reactions often found in his books as a sort of biographical treason.

In 2010, McDonough's biography of Tammy Wynette was published and the book was optioned by director David O. Russell, who had also optioned the author's Russ Meyer biography, but neither movie ever materialized. McDonough assisted musician John Fogerty with his 2015 autobiography Fortunate Son and that same year the director Nicolas Winding Refn published a book of exploitation movie posters largely based on McDonough's collection. Soul Survivor, the author's biography of singer Al Green, was published August 29, 2017. This book appears to be just as contentious as his previous works, with one early reviewer declaring that "McDonough presents himself as someone who, like Green, simply does not give a fuck about what others think."

In 2017, McDonough (along with his cat Buster) became an animated character in the two-part episode on George Jones and Tammy Wynette for Mike Judge's Tales From the Tour Bus. He also edited "Regional Renegades," the first volume for Nicolas Winding Refn's byNWR.com site, which went live in the summer of 2018. In 2019, McDonough appeared as the "Strange Man" in the episode 10 finale of Refn's Too Old to Die Young series. He also provided voice-overs for other episodes. From 2018 to 2022 McDonough was Editor-in-Chief of byNWR.com, where he contributed profiles on Texas honky-tonk singer Frankie Miller, Wayne Cochran, Gary Stewart, carnival star Georgette Dante, Margaret Doll Rod, Tammy Faye Starlite, and the women in Texas exploitation director Dale Berry's films, as well as hosting a podcast on Mississippi preacher Estus Pirkle and the films he made with Ron Ormond.

In 2023 McDonough published an Ormonds biography, The Exotic Ones: That Fabulous Film-Making Family from Music City, U.S.A. – The Ormonds,. He also wrote a long essay for the Blu-ray set released in conjunction with the book, which features all of the Ormond exploitation/religious pictures, From Hollywood to Heaven: The Lost and Saved Films of the Ormond Family. Both Margaret Doll Rod and Tammy Faye Starlite made guest appearances on McDonough's book tour, which was dubbed "The 2023 Jimmy Jimmy Coco Puff World Tour" on social media.

McDonough has authored profiles on Jimmy Scott, Gary Stewart, Hubert Selby, Jr., the Ormond family and Link Wray, and over the span of his career he has written for a number of publications including: The Village Voice, Film Comment, and Variety. McDonough's 544-page, nearly-forty-years-the-making biography of honky-tonk singer Gary Stewart, Gary Stewart: I Am From the Honky-Tonks is coming out in 2026.

== Personal life ==
McDonough lives in the Pacific Northwest. He is somewhat enigmatic about himself, as revealed in a rare 2011 (internet conducted) interview with Jonathan Penner.

== Books ==
Non-fiction

- The Ghastly One: The Sex-Gore Netherworld of Filmmaker Andy Milligan (2001)
- Shakey: Neil Young's Biography (2003)
- Big Bosoms and Square Jaws: The Biography of Russ Meyer, King of the Sex Film (2005)
- Tammy Wynette: Tragic Country Queen (2010)
- Soul Survivor: A Biography of Al Green (2017)
- The Ghastly One: The 42nd Street Netherworld of Director Andy Milligan (2022) (extensively updated version of The Ghastly One)
- The Exotic Ones: That Fabulous Film-Making Family from Music City, USA - The Ormonds (2023)
- The Most Exotic One: Georgette Dante (2023) (only available with limited edition of The Exotic Ones)
- Gary Stewart: I Am from the Honky-Tonks (2025)
