= Niko Bolas =

American music producer

Niko Bolas is an American music producer, sound engineer, and consultant. He is also a business developer in the fields of virtual reality and Internet radio. In 1989, Bolas founded Fakespace Music with Mark Bolas, Ian McDowall, and Christian Greuel. In 1995, Fakespace developed the Soundsculpt Toolkit, a software interface which lets music communicate with graphical elements of virtual reality.

In 1999, Bolas became the CEO of Sonicbox, Inc., an Internet radio company he founded with Mark Bolas and McDowall. Sonicbox changed its name to iM Networks Inc.; it developed and marketed the first internet radio device which was sold in consumer stores through a licensing agreement with the Philips Consumer Electronics Company. iM Networks Inc. received three patents for streaming technologies and put the "iM Band(TM)" alongside AM and FM on the radio dial, allowing consumers to access Internet radio content from around the world.

His current music enterprises are DayDream VR and The Surf Shack Studio in Ventura, California.

Among his most notable production works are Neil Young's This Note's for You, Freedom, Living with War, and Barn, Warren Zevon's Sentimental Hygiene, Steve Perry's first solo album Street Talk, and Melissa Etheridge's debut self-titled album. Bolas is known for his clear and loud recordings of vocals.

In the early 1980s, Bolas collaborated with American hard rock band Kiss. He worked on their album Creatures of the Night, recording Eric Carr's drums. Bolas appears in the cover of the Toto album, Fahrenheit (1986); he is the man walking in the photograph and watching a woman. Bolas was a friend of Jeff Porcaro; Porcaro wanted Bolas on the cover.
