= Psychedelic Pill =

Studio album by Neil Young and Crazy Horse
- Released: October 30, 2012
- Recorded: January 6 – March 7, 2012
- Studios: Audio Casa Blanca, Broken Arrow Ranch, Redwood City, California
- Genres: Psychedelic rock; hard rock; folk rock
- Length: 87:41
- Label: Reprise
- Producers: Neil Young; John Hanlon; Mark Humphreys

Neil Young chronology
Americana (2012)	Psychedelic Pill (2012)	Live at the Cellar Door (2013)

Crazy Horse chronology
Americana (2012)	Psychedelic Pill (2012)	Colorado (2019)

Singles from Psychedelic Pill
- 1. "Born in Ontario" Released: October 15, 2012

Psychedelic Pill is the thirty-fourth studio album by Canadian / American musician Neil Young, released on October 30, 2012. It is the second collaboration between Young and Crazy Horse released in 2012 (the first being Americana) and their first original work together since the Greendale album and tour in 2003 and 2004. The album was streamed on Young's website on October 24, 2012, and leaked onto the Internet the same day.

It was also Young's last album with Crazy Horse to feature guitarist Frank Sampedro before he retired from the band on health grounds.

== Background ==
At 87 minutes in length, Psychedelic Pill is Neil Young's longest studio album and, until World Record in 2022, was the only one to span two compact discs. Many of the songs on the album came out of extended jam sessions with Crazy Horse while recording Americana, released earlier in 2012. Three of Psychedelic Pill's nine tracks are more than 15 minutes in length. The album was recorded at Young's ranch near Redwood City, California.

== Writing ==
The opening track "Driftin' Back", an ode to meditation, makes references to Young's new memoir Waging Heavy Peace and his disdain for MP3s in between segments of extended jamming. Another of the album's extended tracks, "Walk like a Giant", laments the failure of his generation to change the world for the better ("We were ready to save the world / But then the weather changed"). Elsewhere on the album Young recalls listening to Bob Dylan's "Like a Rolling Stone" and Grateful Dead on the radio ("Twisted Road"), and his Canadian roots ("Born in Ontario"). A review of the album for Rolling Stone noted that the riff and lyrics of the title track share similarities with Young's previous work such as "Cinnamon Girl". The main riff is borrowed from Young's "Sign of Love". That track also features the recording filtered with a phaser effect, giving it a "psychedelic" feel (the alternate mix of the title track does not have the phaser effect).

The lyrics to "Ramada Inn" are a portrait of an aging couple who struggle to communicate and resolve their problems. Young discusses the song in a 2019 post to his website: "This song always puts me on I-5 south at the bottom of the Grapevine, heading to LA... It's a Crazy Horse journey, a long road. There's a lot to see... a lot to feel out there on I-5. Don't be scared by this song. It kept me alive. Times were tough. Now times are good. We're rolling again..." Frank "Poncho" Sampedro more directly addresses the song's emotion in Uncut magazine: "The lyrics are very personal to Neil and Pegi. I told Pegi, 'I don't know if you're gonna like this song or not. It seems like it's revealing a lot of stuff. I don't know if it's good or bad. You should check it out.' She came back two days later and said, 'Poncho, it's just a song about people and relationships. Everybody goes through that stuff.' I saw it more as, 'Wow, the writing on the wall has been announced.' I cried a lot of times in that song, man."

Three of the album's songs, "Born in Ontario", "Twisted Road" and "For the Love of Man" were previously attempted for 2010's Le Noise. "For the Love of Man" dates to the 1980s. Young has released a 1987 recording of the song on his online archival album Summer Songs. "Born in Ontario" was inspired by Young's reunion with his family in Canada for his father's funeral in 2005. He explains in a 2019 post to his website: "I wrote this song after returning to Canada for my Dad’s funeral with my Canadian family. Canada gave me a great start in life and we get back there often to visit the lakes in North Ontario. I am proud to be Canadian."

== Recording ==
The album was recorded between January and March 2012, a few months after the completion of Americana. The performance of "Driftin' Back" was the first time the band played the song together. Guitarist Poncho Sampedro explains in a January 2013 interview for Guitar World magazine:

"For that one, Neil just started playing it and we all joined in. I think right before we began, he said something like, 'You know, when we go to the verse it goes to these changes' and he showed us. Nobody really knew when that was gonna happen, but we just followed along. And there might have been some rough spots. I might have dropped my guitar down a couple times. But other than that, that was it. That's the first take. For years I've been telling people that when we get together and jam, it's just like that."

Some of the songs are edited down from their full performances. Young describes the process in his book, Special Deluxe: "I did a lot of work on these tracks with Johnny Hausmann and Jeff Pinn, my two engineers. Work went on for over a month to make the tracks as great as they could be. Most of the time was spent on editing the long instrumental passages, balancing the numerous vocal parts, and preserving the feeling and vibe of each song. Part of the process called for my co-producer, John Hanlon, to come in and do a final pass of all the mixes with fresh ears. Sometimes this can greatly improve the original passes."

== Release ==
A High Fidelity Pure Audio Blu-ray Disc version of the album, with 24-bit/192kHz resolution and two bonus tracks, was released November 19, 2012. A vinyl version is also available.

The 3-LP vinyl version contains the same tracks as the 2-CD set, though in a slightly different order, and with "Driftin' Back" split into two parts over sides A and B. The Blu-ray version contains two bonus tracks: the 37-minute "Horse Back", and a second alternate mix of the song "Psychedelic Pill".

== Reception ==
Professional ratings
Aggregate scores
Source	Rating
Metacritic	79/100
Review scores
Source	Rating
AllMusic	3.5/5 stars
The A.V. Club	A−
Chicago Sun-Times	2/4 stars
NME	8/10
Paste	9.0/10
Pitchfork	7.0/10
PopMatters	7/10
Rolling Stone	4/5 stars
Spin	7/10
Sputnikmusic	4.5/5

Overall, Psychedelic Pill received positive reviews. Rolling Stone gave the album four stars and said "it has the roiling honesty and brutal exuberance of their best records." Douglas Heselgrave, writing for Paste Magazine, said: "Psychedelic Pill may be the best album Neil Young has ever done with Crazy Horse. It'll take years to figure out." Dan Stubbs, giving the album 8 out of 10 stars for NME, writes: "two tracks here – 'Ramada Inn' and 'Walk like a Giant' – could sit among Young's best." Other reviewers were less generous, such as the Chicago Sun-Times, which stated that the album "boasts a few brilliant moments amid numerous typically thundering and meandering dull diversions." Robert Christgau suggested in 2018 that he appreciated the album and may have underrated it at the time of its release, writing it "showed up in my Neither file, which these days is kind of an honor, because I seldom add to it now that I don't feel obliged to nail down every possible Honorable Mention."

The album was listed at number 10 on Rolling Stone's list of the top 50 albums of 2012, saying, "This is as inspiringly strange as anything he's done." They also named the song "Ramada Inn" the fifth best song of 2012.

== Track listing ==
All tracks composed by Neil Young.

=== CD ===
Disc one
No.	Title	Length
1.	"Driftin' Back"	27:36
2.	"Psychedelic Pill"	3:26
3.	"Ramada Inn"	16:49
4.	"Born in Ontario"	3:49
Total length:		51:40

Disc two
No.	Title	Length
1.	"Twisted Road"	3:28
2.	"She's Always Dancing"	8:33
3.	"For the Love of Man"	4:13
4.	"Walk Like a Giant"	16:27
5.	"Psychedelic Pill" (alternate mix)	3:12
Total length:		35:53 87:41

=== Vinyl ===
Side one
No.	Title	Length
1.	"Driftin' Back" (Part 1)	18:14

Side two
No.	Title	Length
1.	"Driftin' Back" (Part 2)	9:58
2.	"Psychedelic Pill" (alternate mix)	3:12

Side three
No.	Title	Length
1.	"Psychedelic Pill"	3:26
2.	"Ramada Inn"	16:52

Side four
No.	Title	Length
1.	"Born in Ontario"	3:49
2.	"Twisted Road"	3:28
3.	"She's Always Dancing"	8:34
4.	"For the Love of Man"	4:13

Side five
No.	Title	Length
1.	"Walk Like a Giant"	16:31

Notes:

- The version of "Psychedelic Pill" appearing on side three is mislabeled as the "alternate mix".
- The blank sixth side of the vinyl release features etched art.

=== Blu-ray ===
No.	Title	Length
1.	"Driftin' Back"	27:42
2.	"Psychedelic Pill"	3:28
3.	"Ramada Inn"	16:50
4.	"Born in Ontario"	3:50
5.	"Twisted Road"	3:28
6.	"She's Always Dancing"	8:33
7.	"For the Love of Man"	4:13
8.	"Walk Like a Giant"	16:28
9.	"Horse Back"	37:05
10.	"Psychedelic Pill" (alternate mix 1)	3:12
11.	"Psychedelic Pill" (alternate mix 2)	3:11

== Personnel ==
- Neil Young – vocals, guitar, pump organ, stringman, whistling, production, mixing

Crazy Horse

- Billy Talbot – bass, vocals
- Ralph Molina – drums, vocals
- Frank "Poncho" Sampedro – guitar, vocals

Additional roles

- John Hanlon – production, recording, engineering, mixing
- Mark Humphreys – production
- John Hausmann – engineering
- John Nowland – recording ("Driftin' Back" acoustic intro), analog to digital transferring
- Charles Brotman – recording ("Driftin' Back" acoustic intro)
- Tim Mulligan – mastering

Blu-ray production

- Bernard Shakey (Neil Young) – direction
- Will Mitchell – production, editing, film research
- Elliot Rabinowitz – executive production
- Toshi Onuki – art direction
- Mark Faulkner – editing, film research
- Benjamin Johnson – editing
- Kris Kunz – graphics
- Cameron Kunz, Sarah Yee – film research
- Marcy Gensic – licensing and clearances

== Charts ==
Chart (2012)	Peak position
Australian Albums (ARIA)	28
Austrian Albums (Ö3 Austria)	11
Belgian Albums (Ultratop Flanders)	6
Belgian Albums (Ultratop Wallonia)	20
Canadian Albums (Billboard)	7
Danish Albums (Hitlisten)	11
Dutch Albums (Album Top 100)	11
Finnish Albums (Suomen virallinen lista)	18
French Albums (SNEP)	19
German Albums (Offizielle Top 100)	4
Irish Albums (IRMA)	9
Italian Albums (FIMI)	19
New Zealand Albums (RMNZ)	20
Norwegian Albums (VG-lista)	6
Scottish Albums (Official Charts)	10
Spanish Albums (Promusicae)	25
Swedish Albums (Sverigetopplistan)	7
Swiss Albums (Schweizer Hitparade)	12
UK Albums (Official Charts)	14
US Billboard 200	8
US Top Rock Albums (Billboard)	2
US Indie Store Album Sales (Billboard)	1
