= Colorado (Neil Young and Crazy Horse album) =

Studio album by Neil Young and Crazy Horse
- Released: October 25, 2019
- Recorded: January 28, 2019; February 4, 2019; April 16 – 25, 2019
- Studio: Studio in the Clouds, Rocky Mountains, Colorado
- Genre: Rock
- Length: 50:21
- Label: Reprise
- Producer: John Hanlon; Neil Young

Neil Young chronology
Tuscaloosa (2019)	Colorado (2019)	Homegrown (2020)

Crazy Horse chronology
Psychedelic Pill (2012)	Colorado (2019)	Return to Greendale (2020)

Singles from Colorado
- 1. "Milky Way" Released: August 30, 2019; 2. "Rainbow of Colors" / "Truth Kills" Released: September 12, 2019

Colorado is the forty-first studio album by Canadian-American singer-songwriter Neil Young (and his first studio album with Crazy Horse since 2012), released on October 25, 2019, by Reprise Records. The album was preceded by the singles "Milky Way" (released on August 30, 2019) and "Rainbow of Colors" (released on September 12, 2019) and is dedicated to Elliot Roberts, Young's manager since 1967, who died aged 76 on June 21, 2019. It was also the first album to feature Nils Lofgren as a member of Crazy Horse since 1971.

== Background ==
Colorado is Young's first album with Crazy Horse since 2012's Psychedelic Pill. After their 2014 tour of Europe, Guitarist Frank "Poncho" Sampedro retired from the group due to arthritis in both hands. The band went on hiatus and Young recorded three albums with Lukas and Micah Nelson's Promise of the Real. For their first shows together in 2018 without Sampedro, and for Colorado, Young enlisted longtime collaborator Nils Lofgren to play guitar.

Young recorded the album near Telluride, Colorado, his new home after moving to be with his wife Daryl Hannah in the wake of losing a second Malibu home to fire.

== Writing ==
Like his last several albums, many of the lyrics are inspired by social issues. In a 2021 post to his website, Young describes "Rainbow of Colors" as "a song about the diversity of America and how strong it remains even under attacks from the harbors of White Supremacy. White Supremacy, now in its early death throes here in America, is the root cause of violence around the country, with the Dept of Homeland Security calling it the largest threat to peace inside the USA today." In a 2019 post, Young explains the urgency for unity as the world seeks to address its social and environmental challenges:

"Rainbow of Colors" is a song about the USA and the whole world. The idea of this song is that we all belong together. Separating us into races and colors is an old idea whose time has passed. With the Earth under the direct influence of Climate Change, we are in crisis together needing to realize that we are all one. Our leaders continually fail to make this point. Preoccupied with their own agendas, they don't see the forest for the trees. We need to all be one because we are all threatened. Climate Change is the unifying force we have needed for a long time. Now that it is here we just need to recognize it and stop turning on our brothers and sisters and help them instead. We are all in this together."

According to a 2019 post to his website, "Help Me Lose My Mind" is about overcoming post-traumatic stress disorder.

"Green Is Blue" addresses climate change. Young explains to NPR: "Mostly, I would like a lot of people to see what's going on on the planet that is so obvious to me. I don't - I just don't know why people don't get it. Or if they do get it, then why don't they get with it?"

== Recording ==
The album was recorded at Studio in the Clouds near Telluride, Colorado over an 11 day stretch in April, 2019. Young and the group employed oxygen to help combat the 9200 foot elevation at the studio during recording. Young recalls to Conan O'Brien:

"This is a record that took eleven straight days and nights. I had written everything, we went in and did the whole record, and we made a documentary about making the record. It was this whole thing and we created it all in that amount of time, it's a really special record! It's tough when you first get up there, you have to acclimate. When you get involved in things you use a lot of energy and you don't realize how much energy you use until you stop using it. You go, 'I have zero energy, I can't even breathe.' So, we had to have [the oxygen tanks] around in the beginning in case that should happen!"

Young also produced a documentary of the sessions, entitled "Mountaintop".

Three of the songs on the album were recorded live the previous winter in Minneapolis and Winnipeg, and then overdubbed during the sessions. Young explains, "We started off doing something that we'd never done before, just to see what would happen. Every time you do a song, it's an opportunity to define it and what it means and how it feels. So if you feel it while you're doing the song [live], you're fucked, you've already done the song. It's only going to happen once like that, when you get that feeling. And so I had that feeling on a couple of the songs, that I'd done the song. I didn't want to do it again."

== Critical reception ==
Professional ratings
Aggregate scores
Source	Rating
Metacritic	79/100
Review scores
Source	Rating
AllMusic	3.5/5 stars
Clash	8/10
Exclaim!	9/10
The Guardian	3/5 stars
The Independent	5/5 stars
NME	4/5 stars
The Observer	4/5 stars
Pitchfork	7.4/10
Rolling Stone	4/5 stars
Slant Magazine	3/5 stars

Colorado received generally positive reviews from critics. At Metacritic, which assigns a normalized rating out of 100 to reviews from critics, the album received an average score of 79, which indicates "generally favorable reviews", based on 19 reviews.

== Track listing ==
All tracks composed by Neil Young.

No.	Title	Length
1.	"Think of Me"	3:02
2.	"She Showed Me Love"	13:36
3.	"Olden Days"	4:04
4.	"Help Me Lose My Mind"	4:14
5.	"Green Is Blue"	3:48
6.	"Shut It Down"	3:43
7.	"Milky Way"	5:59
8.	"Eternity"	2:43
9.	"Rainbow of Colors"	3:35
10.	"I Do"	5:37
Total length:		50:21

== Personnel ==
- Neil Young – lead vocals, guitar, acoustic piano, vibes, harmonica, glass harmonica, production
- Nils Lofgren – guitar, piano, pump organ, taps, vocals
- Billy Talbot – bass, vocals
- Ralph Molina – drums, vocals
- Joe Yankee – glass harmonica

Additional roles

- John Hanlon – production, engineering, mixing
- Daryl Hannah – cover art, photographs
- Drew Doggett – photographs
- Amber Young – cover art
- Adam CK Vollick – spread photo
- Don Michael Sampson – cover art
- Daniele Taska, Alex Tenta – art coordination
- Dana Nielsen – recording, editing
- Philip Broussard, Lynn Peterson, Greg Naylor, Rob Bisel, Dylan Neustadter – assistant engineering
- Chris Bellman – mastering
- Elliot Roberts – direction

== Charts ==
Chart (2019)	Peak position
Australian Digital Albums (ARIA)	19
Austrian Albums (Ö3 Austria)	10
Belgian Albums (Ultratop Flanders)	17
Belgian Albums (Ultratop Wallonia)	25
Canadian Albums (Billboard)	83
Dutch Albums (Album Top 100)	21
Finnish Albums (Suomen virallinen lista)	14
French Albums (SNEP)	36
German Albums (Offizielle Top 100)	6
Hungarian Albums (MAHASZ)	3
Irish Albums (IRMA)	23
Italian Albums (FIMI)	36
New Zealand Albums (RMNZ)	40
Norwegian Albums (VG-lista)	5
Portuguese Albums (AFP)	28
Scottish Albums (OCC)	7
Spanish Albums (Promusicae)	15
Swedish Albums (Sverigetopplistan)	13
Swiss Albums (Schweizer Hitparade)	9
UK Albums (OCC)	17
US Billboard 200	46
US Americana/Folk Albums (Billboard)	1
US Top Rock Albums (Billboard)	5
US Indie Store Album Sales (Billboard)	1
