= John Hanlon (music producer) =

American record producer and recording engineer

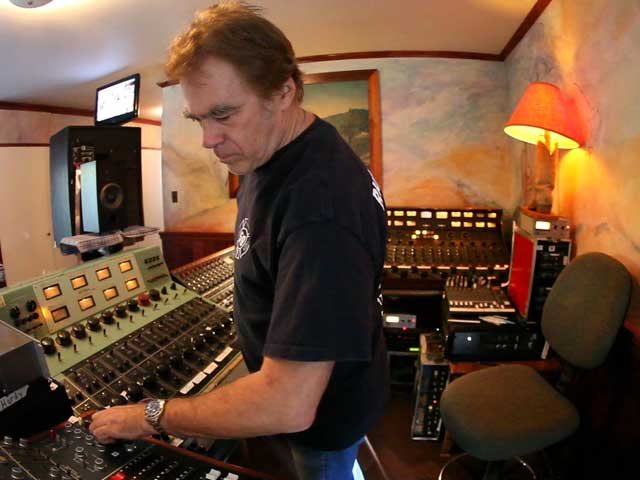
John Hanlon working on Neil Young & Crazy Horse album Americana (Photo by Ben Johnson, Courtesy of Shakey Pictures, 2012).

John Hanlon is an American record producer and recording engineer.

== Career ==
He is best known for producing, engineering, and mixing albums for Neil Young, Stephen Stills, T-Bone Burnett, R.E.M, Gillian Welch, Dennis Wilson, and The Beach Boys.

== Work with Neil Young ==
His relationship with Neil Young started in 1983, when he and David Briggs, Young's longtime producer, were working on Trans remixes. Hanlon joined Briggs again in 1990, engineering and mixing Neil Young and Crazy Horse's album Ragged Glory. He has been working with Young ever since.

== Recording style ==
In an October 2012 interview with Mix magazine, John Hanlon described his recording style:

"To me, some of the greatest records are the ones done with the fewest amount of microphones. The sound I like is orchestral. A classical engineer reading this might cringe, but I approach Neil Young and Crazy Horse orchestrally."

== Selected discography ==
- 2024: Bob Neuwirth - Bob Neuwirth (remixing)
- 2020: Homegrown - Neil Young (remastering)
- 2019: Colorado - Neil Young & Crazy Horse (producer)
- 2016: Peace Trail - Neil Young (producer, engineer, mixing)
- 2016: Earth - Neil Young & Promise of the Real (producer, engineer, mixing)
- 2015: The Monsanto Years - Neil Young (producer, engineer)
- 2012: Psychedelic Pill - Neil Young & Crazy Horse (producer, engineer, mixing)
- 2012: Americana - Neil Young & Crazy Horse (producer, engineer, mixing)
- 2009: Roadsinger - Cat Stevens (engineer)
- 2009: Dreamin' Man - Neil Young (producer)
- 2008: Bambu / Pacific Ocean Blue - Dennis Wilson (producer, composer, engineer, guitar, mixing)
- 2007: Just Roll Tape - Stephen Stills (engineer, mixing)
- 2006: Twenty Twenty – The Essential T-Bone Burnett - T-Bone Burnett (engineer, mixing)
- 2003: Break Your Mother's Heart - Tim Easton (producer, engineer, mixing)
- 2002: Are You Passionate? - Neil Young (engineer)
- 2000: Road Rock: Friends & Relatives - Neil Young (engineer)
- 1999: Debt & Departure - Those Bastard Souls (producer, engineer)
- 1998: Storefront Hitchcock - Robyn Hitchcock (engineer, mixing)
- 1998: The Closer I Get - Hayden (producer, engineer)
- 1998: Up - R.E.M. (mixing)
- 1997: Lovers Knot - Jeb Loy Nichols (mixing)
- 1997: The Bridge School Collection, Vol.1 - Neil Young (producer, mixing)
- 1997: The Next Voice You Hear - Jackson Browne (engineer, mixing)
- 1996: Dead Man - Neil Young (producer, engineer, mixing)
- 1996: Revival - Gillian Welch (mixing)
- 1995: Ball-Hog or Tugboat? - Mike Watt (engineer, mixing)
- 1995: Wild Night Out! - Jimmy Thackery & the Drivers (mixing)
- 1994: Sleeps with Angels - Neil Young & Crazy Horse (engineer, mixing)
- 1993: Unplugged - Neil Young (engineer, mixing)
- 1992: Murder One - Killers (mixing)
- 1992: The Criminal Under My Own Hat - T-Bone Burnett (engineer, mixing)
- 1991: Back to the Country - Johnny Shines (engineer, mixing)
- 1991: Weld - Neil Young & Crazy Horse (mixing)
- 1990: Ragged Glory - Neil Young & Crazy Horse (engineer, mixing)
- 1988: Man in Motion - Night Ranger (engineer)
- 1987: Second Sight - Lonnie Mack (engineer)
- 1985: Be Encouraged - Vickie Winans (engineer)
- 1983: Out for Blood - Lita Ford (assistant engineer)
- 1982: Jump to It - Aretha Franklin (assistant engineer)
- 1979: L.A. (Light Album) - The Beach Boys (engineer)
- 1978: M.I.U. Album - The Beach Boys (engineer)
- 1977: Pacific Ocean Blue - Dennis Wilson (engineer, guitar)
- 1977: Love You - The Beach Boys (engineer)
