= Dead Man (soundtrack) =

Soundtrack album by Neil Young
- Released: February 27, 1996
- Recorded: March 27, 1995
- Studios: Mason St. Studios, San Francisco
- Genres: Instrumental rock; experimental rock
- Length: 62:24
- Label: Vapor
- Producers: Neil Young; John Hanlon

Neil Young chronology
Mirror Ball (1995)	Dead Man (1996)	Broken Arrow (1996)

Professional ratings
Review scores
Source	Rating
AllMusic	3.5/5 stars
Robert Christgau	(dud)
Pitchfork	7.7/10

Dead Man is the soundtrack to the 1995 Jim Jarmusch western-themed film of the same name starring Gary Farmer, and Johnny Depp as William Blake. Both the soundtrack and the film's score are written and performed by Neil Young.

Young recorded the soundtrack by improvising (mostly on Old Black, his famously customized electric guitar, with some acoustic guitar, piano and organ) as he watched the newly edited film alone in a recording studio. The soundtrack album consists of seven instrumental tracks by Young, with dialog excerpts from the film and Johnny Depp reading the poetry of William Blake interspersed between the music. The soundtrack differs from the film score in that it uses background noises of a driving car while the film is set in a time before automobiles were widely available.

Pitchfork ranked the soundtrack at 15 on their "50 Best Movie Scores of All Time" list, saying that "Old Black is featured in its purest form on the soundtrack for Jim Jarmusch's hallucinatory western Dead Man. Young’s low, ominous notes are inseparable from Robby Müller's striking black-and-white cinematography, lending an elemental pull to the increasingly strange odyssey of William Blake (Johnny Depp) and Nobody (Gary Farmer), Blake's sardonic Native American guide."

== Recording ==
Young speaks at length about his creative process in recording the film's score and soundtrack in his memoir, Special Deluxe. For the score, he desired to replicate the sound of a live performer playing along to a film, as was done in the silent film era. Young rented a stage and arranged twenty different monitors of varying sizes in a circle, with his guitar, amp and piano in the center. "Everywhere I looked, I saw the movie. It was inescapable. When I felt like playing to it, I picked up an instrument and played live. I played Old Black, my electric guitar, solo for most of the movie." He continues in a 2004 NPR interview: "The instruments were always close enough for me to go from one to another, and they were all set up and the levels were all set, and everything was recording. So the film started, and I started playing the instruments. So I watched the show - I watched the film go through, and I played all the way through live. I'd put my guitar down and walk over and play the piano in the bar when there's a bar scene. I played the tack piano. Then when that scene was over, I'd walk over from the piano and go play the organ for another scene and then - a little pump organ I have, and then I'd pick up the electric guitar again and get all my distorted sounds out of that to go with the Indian drums and the things that were happening in the film. And basically, it was all a real-time experience." Young played along to the film, repeating the process three times. The final score incorporates the first half of the second take and the second half of the first take.

For the soundtrack album, Young recorded the sound of driving in his Lincoln Continental convertible around the unpaved roads of his ranch, capturing the sound of crickets and the road going by. These sounds are matched with recordings of Johnny Depp reading the poetry of his character's namesake, William Blake.

== Release ==
The album was released in 1996 on CD and vinyl. In addition to a standard CD release, a "special edition" was released, which was bound in a customized cover. Made to look like a 19th-century photo album, the spine is covered in a mauve-brown cloth and the cover itself is a black laminated cardboard. The booklet normally included in the CD is bound in this "book" along with a cardboard folder to hold the disc itself. The version of the main theme used over the film's beginning and end credits is not included, but was released as a promo single.

A reissue of the album was released on 8 March 2019. In addition, both the album and the main theme are available for streaming in 24bit/44.1 kHz quality on Neil Young Archives website.

== Track listing ==
The physical release of the album does not list track titles; the listed titles match those provided on Young's website.

All tracks are written by Neil Young.

No.	Title	Length
1.	"Guitar Solo, No. 1"	5:18
2.	"The Round Stones Beneath the Earth..."	3:32
3.	"Guitar Solo, No. 2"	2:03
4.	"Why Dost Thou Hide Thyself, Clouds..."	2:25
5.	"Organ Solo"	1:33
6.	"Do You Know How to Use This Weapon?"	4:25
7.	"Guitar Solo, No. 3"	4:31
8.	"Nobody's Story"	6:36
9.	"Guitar Solo, No. 4"	4:22
10.	"Stupid White Men..."	8:46
11.	"Guitar Solo, No. 5"	14:41
12.	"Time for You to Leave, William Blake..."	0:51
13.	"Guitar Solo, No. 6"	3:22
Total length:		62:24

== "Theme from Dead Man" ==
The main theme of the film, an instrumental tune featuring acoustic and electric guitar which plays during opening and closing credits, was not included on the soundtrack album (although the motif is reprised throughout it). It was only issued as a rare promo CD single before the album release. A music video was also released, featuring excerpts of the film mixed with studio footage of Young recording the soundtrack.

No.	Title	Length
1.	"Theme from Dead Man" (Edit)	3:18
2.	"Theme from Dead Man" (Edit w/ Johnny Depp spoken words)	3:18
3.	"Theme from Dead Man" (Long version)	5:04
Total length:		11:40

== Personnel ==
- Neil Young – guitars, piano, organ, production
- Johnny Depp – poetry reading

Additional roles

- John Hanlon – production, recording, mixing
- Gary Burden – art direction & design
- Jim Jarmusch, Christine Parry – photography
- Guy Charbonneau, Charles Bouis, Eric Johnston – recording assistance
- John Hausmann, John Nowland – mixing assistance
- Tim Mulligan – editing, mastering

== Charts ==
Chart performance for Dead Man
Chart (1996, 2019)	Peak position
Austrian Albums (Ö3 Austria)	37
German Albums (Offizielle Top 100)	83
UK Soundtrack Albums (Official Charts)	41
