= Americana (Neil Young and Crazy Horse album) =

Studio album by Neil Young and Crazy Horse
- Released: June 5, 2012
- Recorded: October 10 – 12, 2011; November 4 – 5, 2011
- Studio: Broken Arrow Ranch
- Genre: Rock; hard rock; country rock; folk rock; Americana
- Length: 56:50
- Label: Reprise
- Producer: Neil Young; John Hanlon; Mark Humphreys

Neil Young chronology
A Treasure (2011)	Americana (2012)	Psychedelic Pill (2012)

Crazy Horse chronology
Live at the Fillmore East (2006)	Americana (2012)	Psychedelic Pill (2012)

Americana is the thirty-third studio album by Canadian / American musician Neil Young, released on June 5, 2012. The album was Young's first collaboration with backing band Crazy Horse since their 2003 album, Greendale, and its associated tour.

== Background ==
The album was inspired by Young's experiences in his first rock band as a teenager. His band The Squires would play rock versions of old folk standards. He explains in a June 2012 interview with Rolling Stone's Austin Scaggs: "Back in 1964 or '65, the Squires were playing a folk club in Thunder Bay, Ontario [...]. A group called the Thorns did a version of 'Oh Susannah' that just knocked me on my ass." Young continues in interviews for the biography Shakey:

The Thorns came through playin' in nightclubs that we were playing in afternoons. They were the original folk-rock band, okay? Tim Rose and two other guys: no drums, but they had bass, two guitars, I think it was. They did some really nice stuff and sang really well. One of my favorites was "Oh Susannah"; they did this arrangement that was bizarre. It was in a minor key, which completely changed everything, and it was rock and roll. So that idea spawned arrangements of all these other songs for me. I did minor versions of them all. We got into it. That was a certain Squires stage that never got recorded. Wish there were tapes of those shows. We used to do all this stuff, a whole kinda music: folk-rock. We took famous old folk songs like "Clementine", "She'll Be Comin' 'Round the Mountain", "Tom Dooley", and we did them all in minor keys based on the Tim Rose arrangement of "Oh Susannah".

Young's time with the Squires and his early encounters with Tim Rose and The Thorns and his early interactions with Stephen Stills were fresh in his memory due to writing one of his memoirs, Waging Heavy Peace. Young explains to NPR's Terry Gross:

So I was remembering that from writing my book. But at the same time, I was getting ready to record with Crazy Horse, and I had no material. So I went to my studio with - and the Horse was there, and we were ready to play. And I said, well, I don't have any new songs. I'll try this one here, and we'll try some of these just to get loosened up. So we did those, and there was also one other one from a band that came through to the Fourth Dimension club in Thunder Bay that was called the Company, and in that band was Stephen Stills. And he sang a song called "High Flyin' Bird", which I thought also was great. So as I was in the habit of doing at the time, I copped that arrangement, too.

== Songs ==
Young explains his interest in the grittier history and lyrics of the album's songs in American Songwriter:

Every one of these songs has verses that have been ignored. And those are the key verses, those are the things that make these songs live. They're a little heavy for kindergarteners to be singing. The originals are much darker, there's more protest in them — the other verses in "This Land Is Your Land" are very timely, or in "Clementine", the verses are so dark. Almost every one has to do with people getting killed, with life-or-death struggles. You don't hear much about that; they've been made into something much more light. So I moved them away from that gentler interpretation. With new melodies and arrangements, we could use the folk process to invoke the original meanings for this generation.

Young elaborates on some of the forgotten verses of "This Land Is Your Land" for NPR:

Yeah, you didn't sing those. In "This Land is Your Land", I'm sure probably - "By the relief office I saw my people", you know, the whole verse there about people being, you know, going to the relief office in the Depression and all of that. And you didn't sing, you know, after they heard about all the people in the Depression standing in the bread line, you didn't sing: "It made me wonder, is this land made for you and me?" None of that. Those were protest songs when they came out, and they were, you know, cleaned up and milked down for the, you know, New Christy Minstrels, et cetera, and everybody got to sing them like they were happy little songs.

For "Jesus' Chariot (She'll Be Coming Round the Mountain)", Young discovered the song's origins as a spiritual with darker, more meaningful lyrics while researching the song for the album.

I heard that song back in 1964, and I was really into the groove and the melody and the fact that it was an old song with a new melody and old lyrics. And then, when I did it in 2012, I started relating more to the lyrics and did more research on the lyrics. And I actually got into what the lyrics were really about. So I chose a few verses that emphasized a certain darkness, but they were all the original verses. And so that "Jesus' Chariot" thing, I never knew that till I did the research and I just wanted to write interesting liner notes because I felt that the music was a kind of like a studious historic stuff. And I'm using the folk process to change it, you know, which is fair game - but I'm still keeping the message of the original songs. So as I went through and I discovered that it was basically a very religious, kind of a Negro spiritual from back in the day and related to the Second Coming and that the chariot was actually a female - that the she is a chariot and Jesus is coming back in the chariot. It's a very interesting song when you see it for what it is. And then the fact that then there's a darkness. OK, we're going to kill a big red rooster now because Christ is coming back. What does that mean? I found this to be very stimulating. And she will take us to the portals. What does that mean? That's kind of a religious thing. We're going to go to heaven. We're going to go - where were we going? To me these songs are just full of images that are fascinating.

== Recording ==
Young recorded the album with Crazy Horse at his Broken Arrow Ranch in October and November 2011. His wife, Pegi Young and Stephen Stills contribute vocals to the final track. Several tracks also feature a choir. Young and Crazy Horse would record Psychedelic Pill, an album of original songs, at the same location a few months afterward.

== Critical reception ==
Professional ratings
Aggregate scores
Source	Rating
Metacritic	68/100
Review scores
Source	Rating
AllMusic	2/5 stars
Entertainment Weekly	A−
The Guardian	3/5 stars
MSN Music (Expert Witness)	A
NME	5/10
The Observer	5/5 stars
Pitchfork	6.1/10
Rolling Stone	3.5/5 stars
Slant Magazine	2/5 stars
Spin	7/10

Americana received strongly polarized reviews from music critics. It holds an average score of 68 out of 100 at Metacritic, based on 31 reviews. Greg Kot of the Chicago Tribune gave the album three-and-a-half out of four stars, writing that "Americana reveals the hard truth inside songs that have been taken for granted." Dan Forte, in Vintage Guitar, said "this may be his best since Rust [Never Sleeps]." Johnny Dee in his review for the magazine Classic Rock remarks how "Young has picked every song apart, reworked melody and lyrics and made them his own", making them better for it.

In a mixed review, Michael Hann of The Guardian found the album "impossibly pointless" and felt that some songs exhibit "sloppiness" and "unnecessary lengths". NME reviewer considers the album "largely comprised of sub-standard covers of folk songs."

Robert Christgau named Americana the best album of 2012 in his year-end list for The Barnes & Noble Review, and cited it as one of his top 25 albums of the 2010s decade.

== Track listing ==
No.	Title	Writer(s)	Length
1.	"Oh Susannah"	Stephen Collins Foster; arrangement: Tim Rose	5:03
2.	"Clementine"	Traditional; arrangement: Young	5:42
3.	"Tom Dula"	Traditional; arrangement: Young	8:13
4.	"Gallows Pole"	Traditional; arrangement: Odetta Felious Gordon	4:15
5.	"Get a Job"	Richard Lewis, Earl Beal, Raymond Edwards, William Horton	3:01
6.	"Travel On"	Traditional; arrangement: Paul Clayton, Larry Ehrlich, David Lazar, Tom Six	6:47
7.	"High Flyin' Bird"	Billy Edd Wheeler	5:30
8.	"Jesus' Chariot (She'll Be Coming Round the Mountain)"	Traditional; arrangement: Young	5:38
9.	"This Land Is Your Land"	Woody Guthrie	5:26
10.	"Wayfarin' Stranger"	Traditional; arrangement: Burl Ives	3:07
11.	"God Save the Queen"	Thomas Augustine Arne; medley arrangement: Young	4:08

== Personnel ==
- Neil Young – vocals, guitar, production

Crazy Horse

- Billy Talbot – bass, vocals
- Ralph Molina – drums, vocals
- Frank "Poncho" Sampedro – guitar, vocals

Additional personnel

- Dan Greco – orchestral cymbals, tambourine
- Americana Choir – vocals
  - Zander Ayeroff, Lydia Bachman, Emmeline Lehmann Boddicker, Vilem Lehmann Boddicker, Joshua Britt, Mariah Britt, Willa Griffin, Nicholas Harper, Ryan Lisack, Rowen Merrill, Zoe Merrill, Megan Muchow, Nolan Muchow, Rennon O'Neal, Daniel O'Brien, Kiana Scott
- Pegi Young – vocals on "This Land is Your Land"
- Stephen Stills – vocals on "This Land is Your Land"

Additional roles

- John Hanlon – production, recording, mixing, engineering
- Mark Humphreys – production
- John Hausmann, Jeff Pinn – engineering
- Tim Mulligan – mastering
- John Nowland – analog to digital transferring
- Jeremy Miller, Ben O'Neill – assistant engineering
- Darrell Brown – choir direction and arrangements
- Tim Davis – choir conduction
- Elliot Roberts – management

Blu-ray production

- Gary Burden – original concept, film research
- Bernard Shakey (Neil Young) – direction
- Will Mitchell – production, editing, film research
- Elliot Rabinowitz – executive production
- Toshi Onuki – art direction
- Mark Faulkner, Atticus Culver-Rease – editing
- Benjamin Johnson – choir video camera
- Cameron Kunz, Sarah Yee – film research

== Charts ==
=== Weekly charts ===
Chart (2012)	Peak position
Australian Albums (ARIA)	34
Austrian Albums (Ö3 Austria)	14
Belgian Albums (Ultratop Flanders)	7
Belgian Albums (Ultratop Wallonia)	23
Canadian Albums (Billboard)	2
Danish Albums (Hitlisten)	17
Dutch Albums (Album Top 100)	15
Finnish Albums (Suomen virallinen lista)	19
French Albums (SNEP)	27
German Albums (Offizielle Top 100)	12
Irish Albums (IRMA)	4
Italian Albums (FIMI)	32
New Zealand Albums (RMNZ)	26
Norwegian Albums (VG-lista)	11
Spanish Albums (Promusicae)	14
Swedish Albums (Sverigetopplistan)	11
Swiss Albums (Schweizer Hitparade)	17
UK Albums (OCC)	16
US Billboard 200	4
US Top Rock Albums (Billboard)	1
US Indie Store Album Sales (Billboard)	1

=== Year-end charts ===
Chart (2012)	Position
Canadian Albums Chart	42
US Billboard 200	182
US Rock Albums Chart	52
