= Neil Young =

Canadian and American musician (born 1945)

Neil Young OC OM
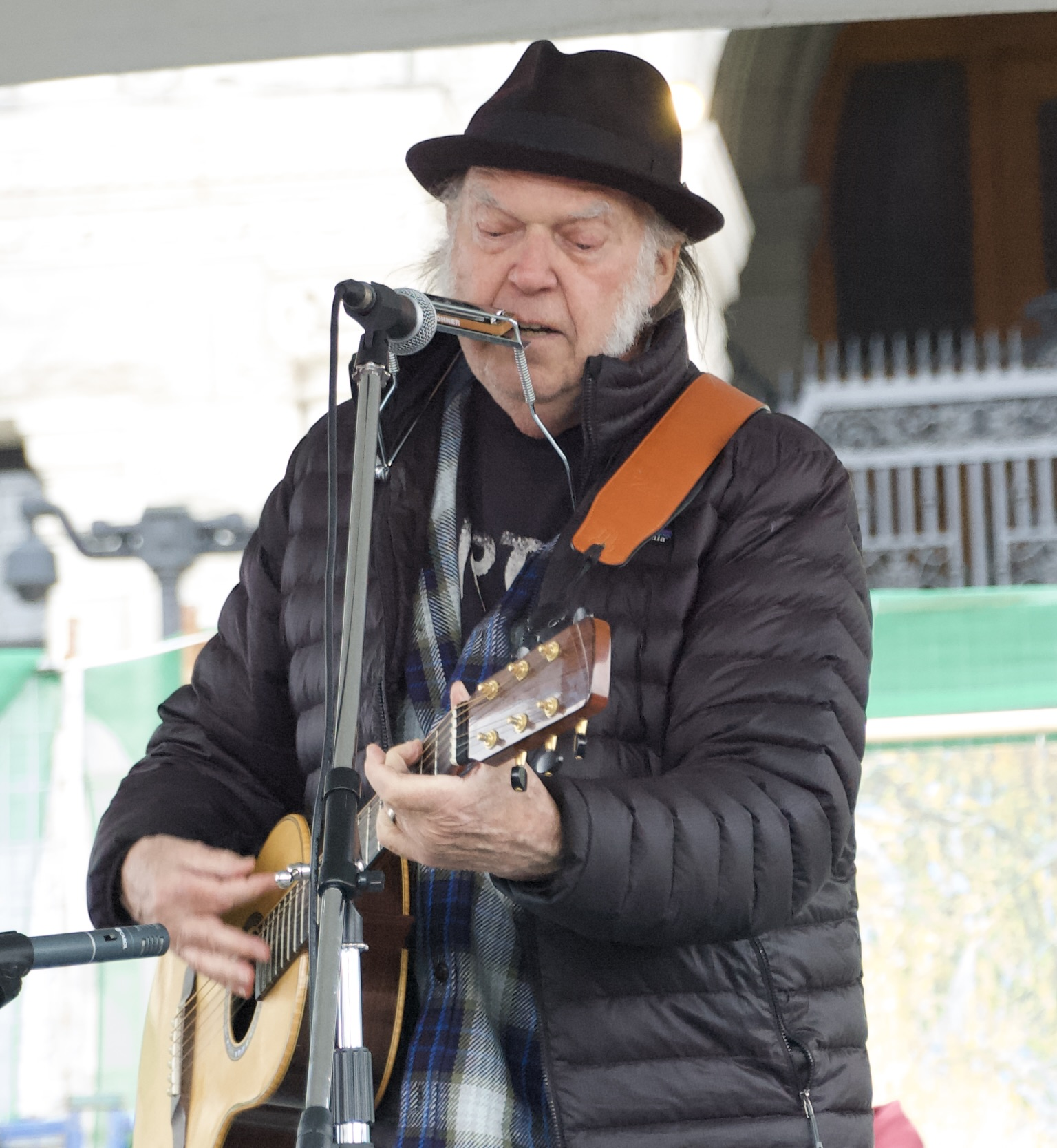
- Young in 2023
- Born: Neil Percival Young; November 12, 1945 (age 81); Toronto, Ontario, Canada
- Other names: Bernard Shakey; Joe Yankee
- Citizenship: Canada; U.S. (from 2020)
- Occupations: Singer-songwriter; musician; film director; screenwriter
- Years active: 1963–present
- Works: Full list
- Spouses: Susan Acevedo (m. 1968; div. 1970) Pegi Morton (m. 1978; div. 2014) Daryl Hannah (m. 2018)
- Partner: Carrie Snodgress (1970–1975)
- Children: 3
- Father: Scott Young
- Relatives: Astrid Young (sister)
- Musical career
- Origin: Winnipeg, Manitoba, Canada
- Genres: Rock; folk rock; country rock; proto-grunge
- Instruments: Vocals; guitar; harmonica; keyboards
- Labels: Warner Bros.; Reprise; Atco; Atlantic; Geffen
- Member of: Crazy Horse; Neil Young and the Chrome Hearts
- Formerly of: The Squires; The Mynah Birds; Buffalo Springfield; Crosby, Stills, Nash & Young; The Stills-Young Band
- Website: neilyoungarchives.com

Neil Percival Young (born November 12, 1945) is a Canadian and American singer-songwriter and musician. Young's deeply personal lyrics and signature high tenor singing voice define his long career. Young's often distorted electric guitar playing, especially with his backing band Crazy Horse, earned him the nickname "Godfather of Grunge" and led to his 1995 album Mirror Ball with Pearl Jam. He also plays piano and harmonica on many albums, which frequently combine folk, rock, country, and other musical genres.

A son of journalist and author Scott Young, Young began his music career in Winnipeg in the 1960s and moved to Los Angeles in 1966 to form the rock group Buffalo Springfield. He began his solo career with Crazy Horse in 1969. Young's solo discography includes critically acclaimed albums such as Everybody Knows This Is Nowhere (1969), After the Gold Rush (1970), Harvest (1972), On the Beach (1974), and Rust Never Sleeps (1979). Young was also a part-time member of the supergroup Crosby, Stills, Nash & Young, with whom he recorded the chart-topping 1970 album Déjà Vu. More recently, he has been backed by Promise of the Real.

Young directed (or co-directed) films using the pseudonym "Bernard Shakey", including Journey Through the Past (1973), Rust Never Sleeps (1979), Human Highway (1982), Greendale (2003), CSNY/Déjà Vu (2008), and Harvest Time (2022). He also contributed to the soundtracks of the films Philadelphia (1993) and Dead Man (1995).

Young has received multiple Grammy and Juno Awards. The Rock and Roll Hall of Fame has inducted him twice: in 1995 as a solo artist and in 1997 as a member of Buffalo Springfield. He is on Rolling Stone magazine's list of the 100 greatest musical artists, and 21 of his albums and singles have been certified gold or platinum in the U.S. He was awarded the Order of Manitoba in 2006 and was made an Officer of the Order of Canada in 2010. In 2023, Rolling Stone ranked him No. 30 on its list of the "250 Greatest Guitarists of All Time".

== Early life (1945–1963) ==
Neil Percival Young was born on November 12, 1945, in Toronto, Ontario. His mother, Edna Blow Ragland "Rassy" Young (1918–1990) was a member of the Daughters of the American Revolution, while his father, Scott Alexander Young (1918–2005), was a journalist and author. Although Canadian, Young's mother had American and French ancestry. His parents married in 1940 in Winnipeg, Manitoba, and moved to Toronto shortly thereafter. There, the couple's first son, Robert "Bob" Young, was born in 1942.

Shortly after Young's birth, the family moved to rural Omemee, Ontario, which he later described fondly as a "sleepy little place". He contracted polio in the late summer of 1951 during the last major outbreak of the disease in Ontario and, as a result, became partially paralyzed on his left side. After the conclusion of his hospitalization, the Young family wintered in Florida because they believed its mild weather would help Neil's convalescence. During that period, Young briefly attended Faulkner Elementary School in New Smyrna Beach, Florida. In 1952, upon returning to Canada, Young moved from Omemee to Pickering (1956) and then lived for a year in Winnipeg (where he would later return) before relocating to Toronto (1957–1960). While in Toronto, he briefly attended Lawrence Park Collegiate Institute as a first-year student in 1959. According to rumor, he was expelled for riding a motorcycle down the hall of the school. He also became interested in the popular music he heard on the radio.

When he was 12, his father, who had had several extramarital affairs, left his mother. She asked for a divorce, which was granted in 1960. She moved back to Winnipeg with Neil joining her there, while his brother, Bob, stayed with their father in Toronto.

During the mid-1950s, Young listened to rock 'n roll, rockabilly, doo-wop, R&B, country, and western pop. He idolized Elvis Presley and later referred to him in a number of his songs. Other early musical influences included Link Wray, Lonnie Mack, Jimmy Gilmer and the Fireballs, The Ventures, Cliff Richard and the Shadows, Chuck Berry, Hank Marvin, Little Richard, Fats Domino, The Chantels, The Monotones, Ronnie Self, the Fleetwoods, Jerry Lee Lewis, Johnny Cash, Roy Orbison, and Gogi Grant. Young began to play music on a plastic ukulele before, as he would later relate, going on to "a better ukulele to a banjo ukulele to a baritone ukulele – everything but a guitar."

== Career ==
=== Early career (1963–1966) ===
Young and his mother settled in the working-class area of Fort Rouge, Winnipeg, where he enrolled in Earl Grey Junior High School. It was there that he formed his first band, the Jades, and met Ken Koblun. While attending Kelvin High School in Winnipeg, he played in several instrumental rock bands, eventually dropping out of school in favor of a musical career. Young's first stable band was the Squires, with Ken Koblun, Jeff Wuckert and Bill Edmondson on drums, who had a local hit called "The Sultan". Over three years, the band played hundreds of shows at community centers, dance halls, clubs and schools in Winnipeg and other parts of Manitoba. The band also played in Fort William (now part of the city of Thunder Bay, Ontario), where they recorded a series of demos produced by a local producer, Ray Dee, whom Young called "the original Briggs", referring to his later producer David Briggs. While playing at The Flamingo, Young met Stephen Stills, whose band the Company was playing at the same venue, and they became friends. The Squires primarily performed in Winnipeg and rural Manitoba in towns such as Selkirk, Neepawa, Brandon and Giroux (near Steinbach), with a few shows in northern Ontario.

After leaving the Squires, Young worked in folk clubs in Winnipeg, where he first met Joni Mitchell. Mitchell recalls Young as having been highly influenced by Bob Dylan at the time. Young said Phil Ochs was "a big influence on me", telling a radio station in 1969 that Ochs was "on the same level with Dylan in my eyes." Here he wrote some of his earliest and most enduring folk songs such as "Sugar Mountain", about lost youth. Mitchell wrote "The Circle Game" in response. The Winnipeg band the Guess Who (with Randy Bachman as lead guitarist) had a Canadian Top 40 hit with Young's "Flying on the Ground is Wrong", which was Young's first major success as a songwriter.

In 1965, Young toured Canada as a solo artist. In 1966, while in Toronto, he joined the Rick James-fronted Mynah Birds. The band managed to secure a record deal with the Motown label, but as their first album was being recorded, James was arrested for being AWOL from the Navy Reserve. After the Mynah Birds disbanded, Young and the bass player Bruce Palmer decided to pawn the group's musical equipment and buy a Pontiac hearse, which they used to relocate to Los Angeles. Young admitted in a 1975 interview that he was in the United States illegally until he received a "green card" (permanent residency permit) in 1970.

=== Buffalo Springfield (1966–1968) ===
Once they reached Los Angeles, Young and Palmer met up with Stephen Stills and Richie Furay after a chance encounter in traffic on Sunset Boulevard. Along with Dewey Martin, they formed Buffalo Springfield. A mixture of folk, country, psychedelia, and rock, lent a hard edge by the twin lead guitars of Stills and Young, made Buffalo Springfield a critical success, and their first record, Buffalo Springfield (1966), sold well after Stills' topical song "For What It's Worth" became a hit, aided by Young's melodic harmonics played on electric guitar. According to Rolling Stone, the Rock and Roll Hall of Fame and other sources, Buffalo Springfield helped create the genres of folk rock and country rock.

Distrust of their management, as well as the arrest and deportation of Palmer, worsened the already strained relations among the group members and led to Buffalo Springfield's demise. A second album, Buffalo Springfield Again, was released in late 1967, but two of Young's three contributions were solo tracks recorded apart from the rest of the group. From that album, "Mr. Soul" was the only Young song of the three that all five members of the group performed together.

In May 1968, the band split up for good, but to fulfill a contractual obligation, a final studio album, Last Time Around, was released. Young contributed the songs "On the Way Home" and "I Am a Child", singing lead on the latter.

In 1997, the band was inducted into the Rock and Roll Hall of Fame; Young did not appear at the ceremony, writing in a letter to the Hall that their presentation, which was aired on VH1, "has nothing to do with the spirit of Rock and Roll. It has everything to do with making money."

Young played as a studio session guitarist for some 1968 recordings by The Monkees which appeared on the Head and Instant Replay albums.

=== Going solo, Crazy Horse (1968–1969) ===
After the breakup of Buffalo Springfield, Young signed a solo deal with Reprise Records, home of his colleague and friend Joni Mitchell, with whom he shared a manager, Elliot Roberts. Roberts managed Young until Roberts' death in 2019. Young and Roberts immediately began work on Young's first solo record, Neil Young (January 22, 1969), which received mixed reviews. In a 1970 interview, Young deprecated the album as being "overdubbed rather than played".

For his next album, Young recruited three musicians from a band called the Rockets: Danny Whitten on guitar, Billy Talbot on bass guitar, and Ralph Molina on drums. These three took the name Crazy Horse (after the historical figure of the same name), and Everybody Knows This Is Nowhere (May 1969) is credited to "Neil Young with Crazy Horse". Recorded in just two weeks, the album includes "Cinnamon Girl", "Cowgirl in the Sand", and "Down by the River". Young reportedly wrote all three songs in bed on the same day while nursing a high fever of 39 °C (102 °F).

=== Crosby, Stills, Nash, and Young (1969–1970) ===
Shortly after the release of Everybody Knows This Is Nowhere, Young reunited with Stephen Stills by joining Crosby, Stills & Nash, who had already released one album, Crosby, Stills & Nash, as a trio in May 1969. Young was originally offered a position as a sideman but agreed to join only if he received full membership, and the group – winners of the 1969 Best New Artist Grammy Award – was renamed Crosby, Stills, Nash & Young. The quartet debuted in Chicago on August 16, 1969, and later performed at the famous Woodstock Festival, during which Young skipped the majority of the acoustic set and refused to be filmed during the electric set, even telling the cameramen: "One of you fuckin' guys comes near me and I'm gonna fuckin' hit you with my guitar". During the making of their first album, Déjà Vu (March 11, 1970), the musicians frequently argued, particularly Young and Stills, who both fought for control. Stills continued throughout their lifelong relationship to criticize Young, saying that he "wanted to play folk music in a rock band".

Young wrote "Ohio" after the Kent State massacre on May 4, 1970. CSNY quickly recorded the song and released it as a single, even as CSNY's "Teach Your Children" was still climbing the singles charts.

=== After the Gold Rush, acoustic tour and Harvest (1970–1972) ===
Later in the year, Young released his third solo album, After the Gold Rush (August 31, 1970), which featured, among others, Nils Lofgren, Stephen Stills, and CSNY bassist Greg Reeves. Young also recorded some tracks with Crazy Horse, but dismissed them early in the sessions. The eventual recording was less amplified than Everybody Knows This is Nowhere, with a wider range of sounds. Young's newfound fame with CSNY made the album his commercial breakthrough as a solo artist, and it contains some of his best-known work, including "Tell Me Why" and "Don't Let It Bring You Down"; the singles "Only Love Can Break Your Heart" and "When You Dance I Can Really Love"; and the title track, "After the Gold Rush", played on piano, with dreamlike lyrics that ran a gamut of subjects from drugs and interpersonal relationships to environmental concerns. Young's bitter condemnation of racism in the heavy blues-rock song "Southern Man" (along with a later song entitled "Alabama") was also controversial with southerners in an era of desegregation, prompting Lynyrd Skynyrd to decry Young by name in the lyrics to their hit "Sweet Home Alabama". However, Young said he was a fan of Skynyrd's music, and the band's front man Ronnie Van Zant was later photographed wearing a Tonight's the Night T-shirt on the cover of an album.

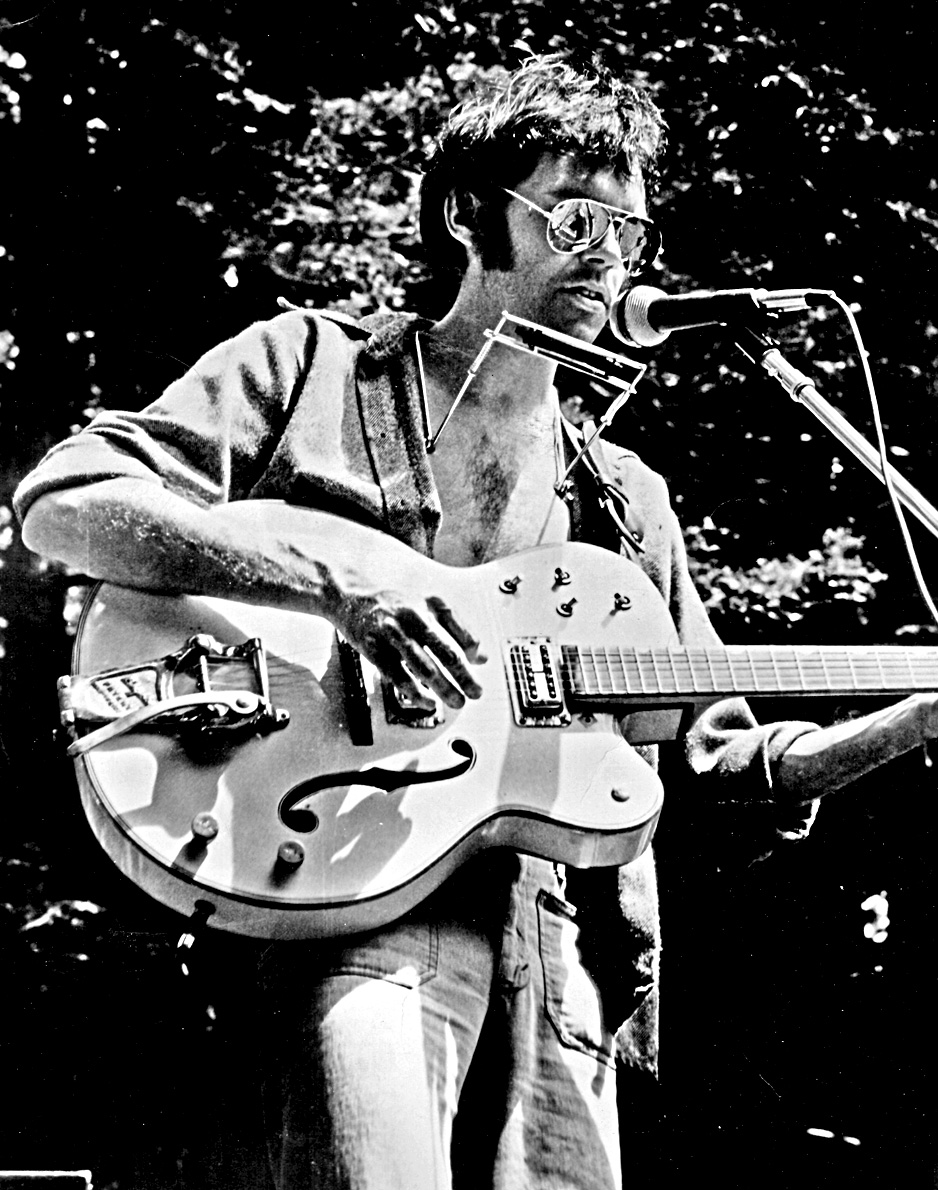
Young in the 1970s

In the autumn of 1970, Young began a solo acoustic tour of North America, during which he played a variety of his Buffalo Springfield and CSNY songs on guitar and piano, along with material from his solo albums and several new songs. Some songs premiered by Young on the tour, like "Journey through the Past", would never find a home on a studio album, while other songs, like "See the Sky About to Rain", would only be released in coming years. Many gigs were sold out, including concerts at Carnegie Hall and a pair of acclaimed hometown shows at Toronto's Massey Hall, which were taped for a planned live album. The shows became legendary among Young fans, with Live at Massey Hall 1971 being released in 2007, and other shows as official bootlegs in 2021 and 2022, as a part of Young's Archive series.

Near the end of his tour, Young performed one of the new acoustic songs on the Johnny Cash TV show. "The Needle and the Damage Done", a somber lament on the pain caused by heroin addiction, had been inspired in part by Crazy Horse member Danny Whitten, who eventually died while battling his drug problems. While in Nashville for the Cash taping, Young accepted the invitation of Quadrafonic Sound Studios owner Elliot Mazer to record tracks there with a group of country-music session musicians who were pulled together at the last minute. Making a connection with them, he christened them The Stray Gators, and began playing with them. Befitting the immediacy of the project, Linda Ronstadt and James Taylor were brought in from the Cash taping to do background vocals. Against the advice of his producer David Briggs, he scrapped plans for the imminent release of the live acoustic recording in favor of a studio album consisting of the Nashville sessions, electric-guitar oriented sessions recorded later in his barn, and two recordings made with the London Symphony Orchestra at Barking (credited as Barking Town Hall and now the Broadway Theatre) during March 1971. The result was Young's fourth album, Harvest (February 15, 1972), which was also the best selling album of 1972 in the US.

After his success with CSNY, Young purchased a ranch in the rural hills above Woodside and Redwood City in Northern California ("Broken Arrow Ranch", where he lived until his divorce in 2014). He wrote the song "Old Man" in honor of the land's longtime caretaker, Louis Avila. The song "A Man Needs a Maid" was inspired by his relationship with actress Carrie Snodgress. "Heart of Gold" was released as the first single from Harvest, the only No. 1 hit in his career. "Old Man" was also popular, reaching No. 31 on the Billboard Hot 100 chart, marking Young's third and final appearance in the chart's Top 40 as a solo artist.

The album's recording had been almost accidental. Its mainstream success caught Young off guard, and his first instinct was to back away from stardom. In the Decade (1977) compilation, Young chose to include his greatest hits from the period, but his handwritten liner notes famously described "Heart of Gold" as the song that "put me in the middle of the road. Traveling there soon became a bore, so I headed for the ditch. A rougher ride but I saw more interesting people there."

=== The "Ditch" Trilogy and personal struggles (1972–1974) ===
Although a new tour with The Stray Gators (now augmented by Danny Whitten) had been planned to follow up on the success of Harvest, it became apparent during rehearsals that Whitten could not function due to drug abuse. On November 18, 1972, shortly after he was fired from the tour preparations, Whitten was found dead of an apparent alcohol/diazepam overdose. Young described the incident to Rolling Stone's Cameron Crowe in 1975: "[We] were rehearsing with him and he just couldn't cut it. He couldn't remember anything. He was too out of it. Too far gone. I had to tell him to go back to L.A. 'It's not happening, man. You're not together enough.' He just said, 'I've got nowhere else to go, man. How am I gonna tell my friends?' And he split. That night the coroner called me from L.A. and told me he'd OD'd. That blew my mind. I loved Danny. I felt responsible. And from there, I had to go right out on this huge tour of huge arenas. I was very nervous and ... insecure."

On the tour, Young struggled with his voice and the performance of drummer Kenny Buttrey, a noted Nashville session musician who was unaccustomed to performing in the hard rock milieu; Buttrey was eventually replaced by former CSNY drummer Johnny Barbata, while David Crosby and Graham Nash contributed rhythm guitar and backing vocals to the final dates of the tour. Young has often said the album assembled in the aftermath, Time Fades Away (October 15, 1973), was his least favorite. It was not officially released on CD until 2017 (as part of Young's Official Release Series). Nevertheless, Young and his band tried several new musical approaches in this period. Time Fades Away was recorded live, although it was an album of new material, an approach Young would repeat with more success later on. Time was the first of three consecutive commercial failures which became known collectively to fans as the "Ditch Trilogy", as contrasted with the more middle-of-the-road pop of Harvest.

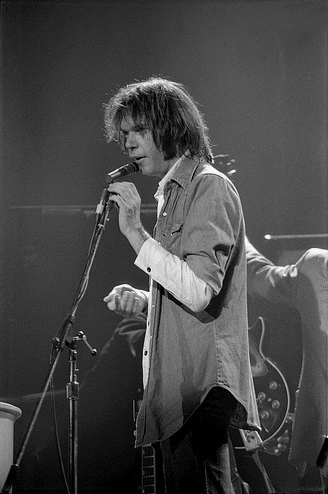
Young in Austin, Texas, on November 9, 1976

In the second half of 1973, Young formed The Santa Monica Flyers, with Crazy Horse's rhythm section augmented by Nils Lofgren on guitar and piano and Harvest/Time Fades Away veteran Ben Keith on pedal steel guitar. Deeply affected by the drug-induced deaths of Whitten and roadie Bruce Berry, Young recorded an album specifically inspired by the incidents, Tonight's the Night (June 20, 1975). The album's dark tone and rawness led Reprise to delay its release and Young had to pressure them for two years before they would do so. While his record company was stalling, Young recorded another album, On the Beach (July 16, 1974), which presented a more melodic, acoustic sound at times, including a recording of the older song "See the Sky About to Rain", but dealt with similarly dark themes such as the collapse of 1960s folk ideals, the downside of success and the underbelly of the Californian lifestyle. Like Time Fades Away, it sold poorly but eventually became a critical favorite, presenting some of Young's most original work. A review of the 2003 re-release on CD of On the Beach described the music as "mesmerizing, harrowing, lucid, and bleary".

After completing On the Beach, Young reunited with Harvest producer Elliot Mazer to record another acoustic album, Homegrown. Most of the songs were written after Young's breakup with Carrie Snodgress, and thus the tone of the album was somewhat dark. Though Homegrown was reportedly entirely complete, Young decided, not for the first or last time in his career, to drop it and release something else instead, in this case, Tonight's the Night, at the suggestion of Band bassist Rick Danko. Young further explained his move by saying: "It was a little too personal ... it scared me". Most of the songs from Homegrown were later incorporated into other Young albums while the original album was not released until 2020. Tonight's the Night, when finally released in 1975, sold poorly, as had the previous albums of the "ditch" trilogy, and received mixed reviews at the time, but is now regarded as a landmark album. In Young's own opinion, it was the closest he ever came to art.

=== Reunions, retrospectives and Rust Never Sleeps (1974–1979) ===
Young reunited with Crosby, Stills, and Nash after a four-year hiatus in the summer of 1974 for a concert tour that was partially recorded; highlights were ultimately released in 2014 as CSNY 1974. It was one of the first ever stadium tours and the largest tour in which Young has participated to date.

In 1975, Young reformed Crazy Horse with Frank Sampedro on guitar as his backup band for his eighth album, Zuma (November 10, 1975). Many of the songs dealt with the theme of failed relationships; "Cortez the Killer", a retelling of the Spanish conquest of Mexico from the viewpoint of the Aztecs, may also be heard as an allegory of love lost. Zuma's closing track, "Through My Sails", was the only released fragment from aborted sessions with Crosby, Stills and Nash for another group album.

In 1976, Young reunited with Stephen Stills for the album Long May You Run (September 20, 1976), credited to The Stills-Young Band; the follow-up tour was ended midway through by Young, who sent Stills a telegram that read: "Funny how some things that start spontaneously end that way. Eat a peach, Neil."

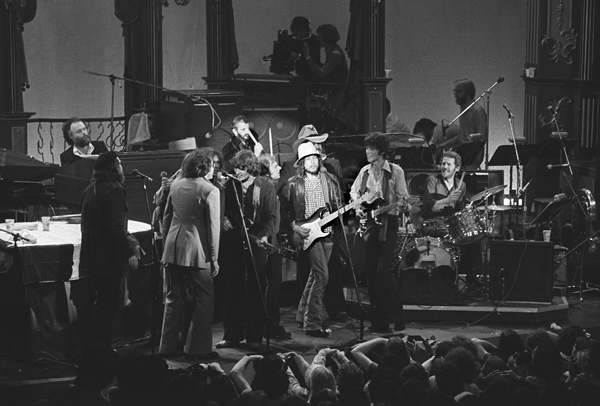
The Last Waltz, Young (center on left microphone) performing with Bob Dylan and The Band, among others in 1976

In 1976, Young performed with Bob Dylan, Joni Mitchell, and numerous other rock musicians in the high-profile all-star concert The Last Waltz, the final performance by The Band. The release of Martin Scorsese's movie of the concert was delayed while Scorsese unwillingly re-edited it to obscure the lump of cocaine that was clearly visible hanging from Young's nose during his performance of "Helpless". American Stars 'n Bars (June 13, 1977) contained two songs originally recorded for the Homegrown album, "Homegrown" and "Star of Bethlehem", as well as newer material, including the future concert staple "Like a Hurricane". Performers on the record included Linda Ronstadt, Emmylou Harris and Young protégé Nicolette Larson along with Crazy Horse. In 1977, Young also released the compilation Decade, a personally selected set of songs spanning every aspect of his work, including a handful of previously unreleased songs. The record included less commercial album tracks alongside radio hits.

In June 1977 Young joined with Jeff Blackburn, Bob Mosley and John Craviotto (who later founded Craviotto drums) to form a band called The Ducks. Over seven-week the band performed 22 shows in Santa Cruz CA but were not allowed to appear beyond city limits due to Young's Crazy Horse contract. In April 2023 Young officially released a double album of songs culled from the band's performances at multiple venues as well as from sessions at a local recording studio. The double album was part of the Neil Young Archives project positioned within the Official Bootleg Series, titled High Flyin'.

Comes a Time (October 2, 1978), Young's first entirely new solo recording since the mid-1970s, marked a return to the commercially accessible, Nashville-inspired sound of Harvest while also featuring contributions from Larson and Crazy Horse. The album also marked a return to his folk roots, as exemplified by a cover of Ian Tyson's "Four Strong Winds", a song Young associated with his childhood in Canada. Another of the album's songs, "Lotta Love", was also recorded by Larson, with her version reaching No. 8 on the Billboard Hot 100 in February 1979. In 1978, much of the filming was done for Young's film Human Highway, which took its name from a song featured on Comes a Time. Over four years, Young would spend US$3,000,000 of his own money on production (US$14,808,673 in 2025 dollars). This also marked the beginning of his brief collaboration with the art punk band Devo, whose members appeared in the film.

Young set out in 1978 on the lengthy Rust Never Sleeps tour, in which he played a wealth of new material. Each concert was divided into a solo acoustic set and an electric set with Crazy Horse. The electric sets, featuring an abrasive style of playing, were influenced by the punk rock zeitgeist of the late 1970s and provided a stark contrast from Comes a Time. Two new songs, the acoustic "My My, Hey Hey (Out of the Blue)" and electric "Hey Hey, My My (Into the Black)" were the centerpiece of the new material. During the filming of Human Highway, Young had collaborated with Devo on a cacophonous version of "Hey Hey, My My" at the Different Fur studio in San Francisco and would later introduce the song to Crazy Horse. The lyric "It's better to burn out than to fade away" was widely quoted by his peers and critics. The album has also widely been considered a precursor of grunge music with the bands Nirvana and Pearl Jam having cited Young's heavily distorted and abrasive guitar style on the B side to this album as an inspiration. Young also compared the rise of Johnny Rotten with that of the recently deceased "King" Elvis Presley, who himself had once been disparaged as a dangerous influence only to later become an icon. Rotten returned the favor by playing one of Young's songs, "Revolution Blues" from On the Beach, on a London radio show, an early sign of Young's eventual embrace by several punk-influenced alternative musicians.

Young's two accompanying albums Rust Never Sleeps (July 2, 1979; new material culled from live recordings, but featuring studio overdubs) and Live Rust (November 19, 1979; a genuine concert recording featuring old and new material) captured the two sides of the concerts, with solo acoustic songs on side A, and fierce, uptempo, electric songs on side B. A movie version of the concerts, also called Rust Never Sleeps (1979), was directed by Young under the pseudonym "Bernard Shakey". Young worked with rock artist Jim Evans to create the poster art for the film, using the Star Wars Jawas as a theme. Young's work since Harvest had alternated between being rejected by mass audiences and being seen as backward-looking by critics, sometimes both at once, and now he was suddenly viewed as relevant by a new generation, who began to discover his earlier work. Readers and critics of Rolling Stone voted him Artist of the Year for 1979 (along with The Who), selected Rust Never Sleeps as Album of the Year, and voted him Male Vocalist of the Year as well. The Village Voice named Rust Never Sleeps as the year's second best album in the Pazz & Jop Poll, a survey of nationwide critics, and honored Young as the Artist of the Decade.

=== Experimental years (1980–1988) ===
After providing the incidental music to the 1980 film Where the Buffalo Roam, Young released Hawks & Doves (November 3, 1980), a short record pieced together from sessions going back to 1974.

Re·ac·tor (1981), an electric album recorded with Crazy Horse, also included material from the 1970s. Young did not tour in support of either album; in total, he played only two shows, a set at the 1980 Bread and Roses Festival in Berkeley and another at the Mike Bloomfield Tribute at The Ritz, between the end of his 1978 tour with Crazy Horse and the start of his tour with the Trans Band in mid-1982.

The 80s were really good. The 80s were like, artistically, very strong for me, because I knew no boundaries and was experimenting with everything that I could come across, sometimes with great success, sometimes with terrible results, but nonetheless I was able to do this, and I was able to realize that I wasn't in a box, and I wanted to establish that.

— Neil Young

The 1982 album Trans, which incorporated vocoders, synthesizers, and electronic beats, was Young's first for the new label Geffen Records (distributed at the time by Warner Bros. Records, whose parent Warner Music Group owns most of Young's solo and band catalog) and represented a distinct stylistic departure. Young later revealed that an inspiration for the album was the theme of technology and communication with his son, who could not speak. An extensive tour preceded the release of the album and was documented by the video Neil Young in Berlin, which saw release in 1986.

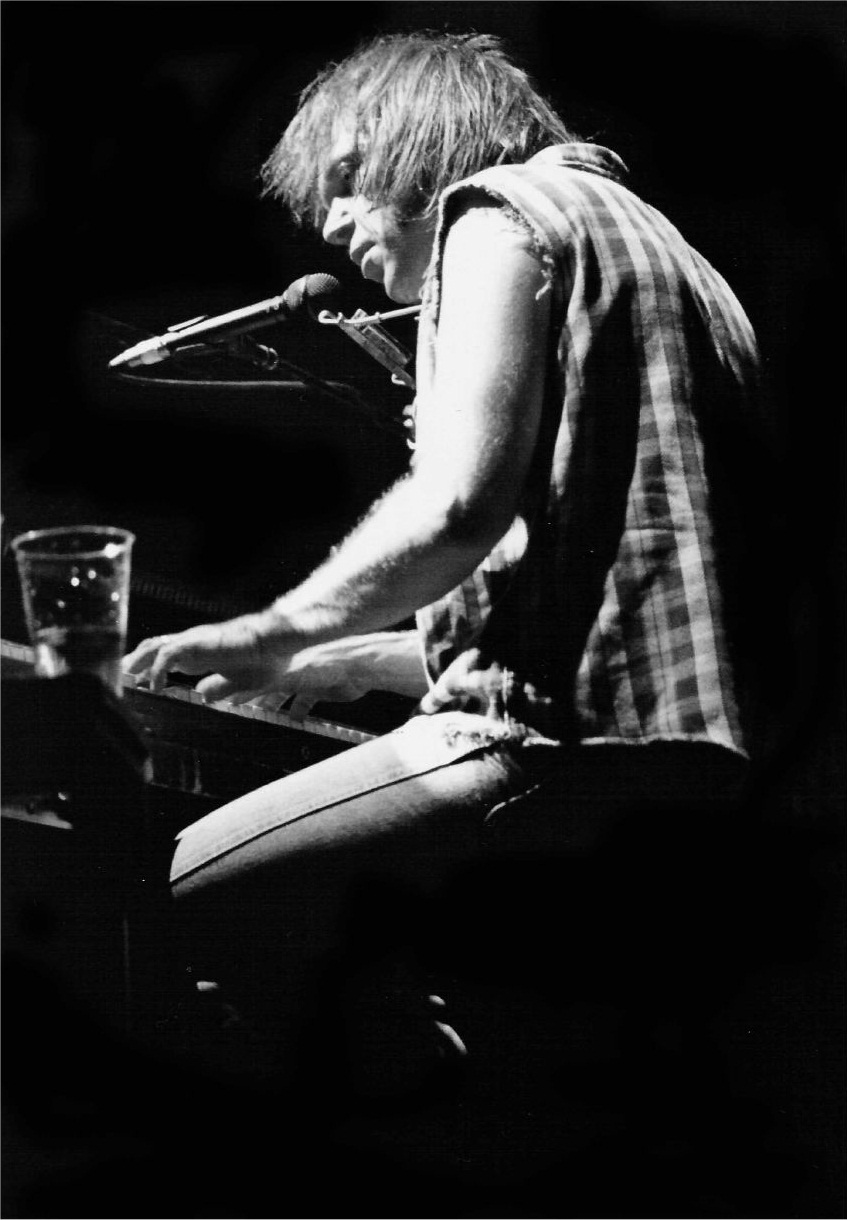
Young playing in Barcelona, Spain, 1984

Young's next album, 1983's Everybody's Rockin', included several rockabilly covers and clocked in at less than 25 minutes in length. Young was backed by the Shocking Pinks for the supporting US tour. Trans (1982) had already drawn the ire of label head David Geffen for its lack of commercial appeal, and with Everybody's Rockin' following seven months later, Geffen Records sued Young for making music "unrepresentative" of himself. The album was also notable as the first for which Young made commercial music videos – Tim Pope directed the videos for "Wonderin'" and "Cry, Cry, Cry". Also premiered in 1983, though little seen, was the long-gestating Human Highway. Co-directed and co-written by Young, the eclectic comedy starred Young, Dean Stockwell, Russ Tamblyn, Dennis Hopper, David Blue, Sally Kirkland, Charlotte Stewart and members of Devo.

Young did not release an album in 1984, his first unproductive year since beginning his career with Buffalo Springfield in 1966. Young's lack of productivity was largely due to the ongoing legal battle with Geffen, although he was also frustrated that the label had rejected his 1983 country album Old Ways. It was also the year when Young's third child was born, a girl named Amber Jean, who was later diagnosed with inherited epilepsy.

Young spent most of 1984 and all of 1985 touring for Old Ways (August 12, 1985) with his country band, the International Harvesters. The album was finally released in an altered form midway through 1985. Young also appeared at that year's Live Aid concert in Philadelphia, collaborating with Crosby, Stills and Nash for the quartet's first performance for a paying audience in over ten years.

Young's last two albums for Geffen were more conventional in the genre, although they incorporated production techniques like synthesizers and echoing drums that were previously uncommon in Young's music. Young recorded 1986's Landing on Water without Crazy Horse but reunited with the band for the subsequent year-long tour and final Geffen album, Life, which emerged in 1987. Young's album sales dwindled steadily throughout the eighties; today Life remains his all-time-least successful studio album, with an estimated four hundred thousand sales worldwide.

Switching back to his old label Reprise Records, Young continued to tour relentlessly, assembling a new blues band called The Bluenotes in mid-1987 (a legal dispute with musician Harold Melvin forced the eventual rechristening of the band as Ten Men Working midway through the tour). The addition of a brass section provided a new jazzier sound, and the title track of 1988's This Note's For You became Young's first hit single of the decade. Accompanied by a video that parodied corporate rock, the pretensions of advertising, and Michael Jackson, the song was initially unofficially banned by MTV for mentioning the brand names of some of their sponsors. Young wrote an open letter, "What does the M in MTV stand for: music or money?" Despite this, the video was eventually named best video of the year by the network in 1989.

Young reunited with Crosby, Stills, and Nash to record the 1988 album American Dream and play two benefit concerts late in the year, but the group did not embark upon a full tour.

Young attracted criticism from liberals in the music industry when he supported President Ronald Reagan and said he was "tired of people constantly apologizing for being Americans". In a 1985 interview with Melody Maker, he said about the AIDS pandemic: "You go to a supermarket and you see a faggot behind the fuckin' cash register, you don't want him to handle your potatoes." In the same interview, Young also complained about welfare beneficiaries, saying: "Stop being supported by the government and get out and work. You have to make the weak stand up on one leg, or half a leg, whatever they've got." Rolling Stone wrote in 2013 that Young "almost certainly regrets that horrific statement" and that he "quickly moved away from right-wing politics".

Young took a turn at acting in 1988 by appearing in the Steven Kovacs film '68. He played the character Westy, a cranky owner of a motorcycle shop and a fan of Senator Joseph McCarthy.

=== Return to prominence (1989–1999) ===
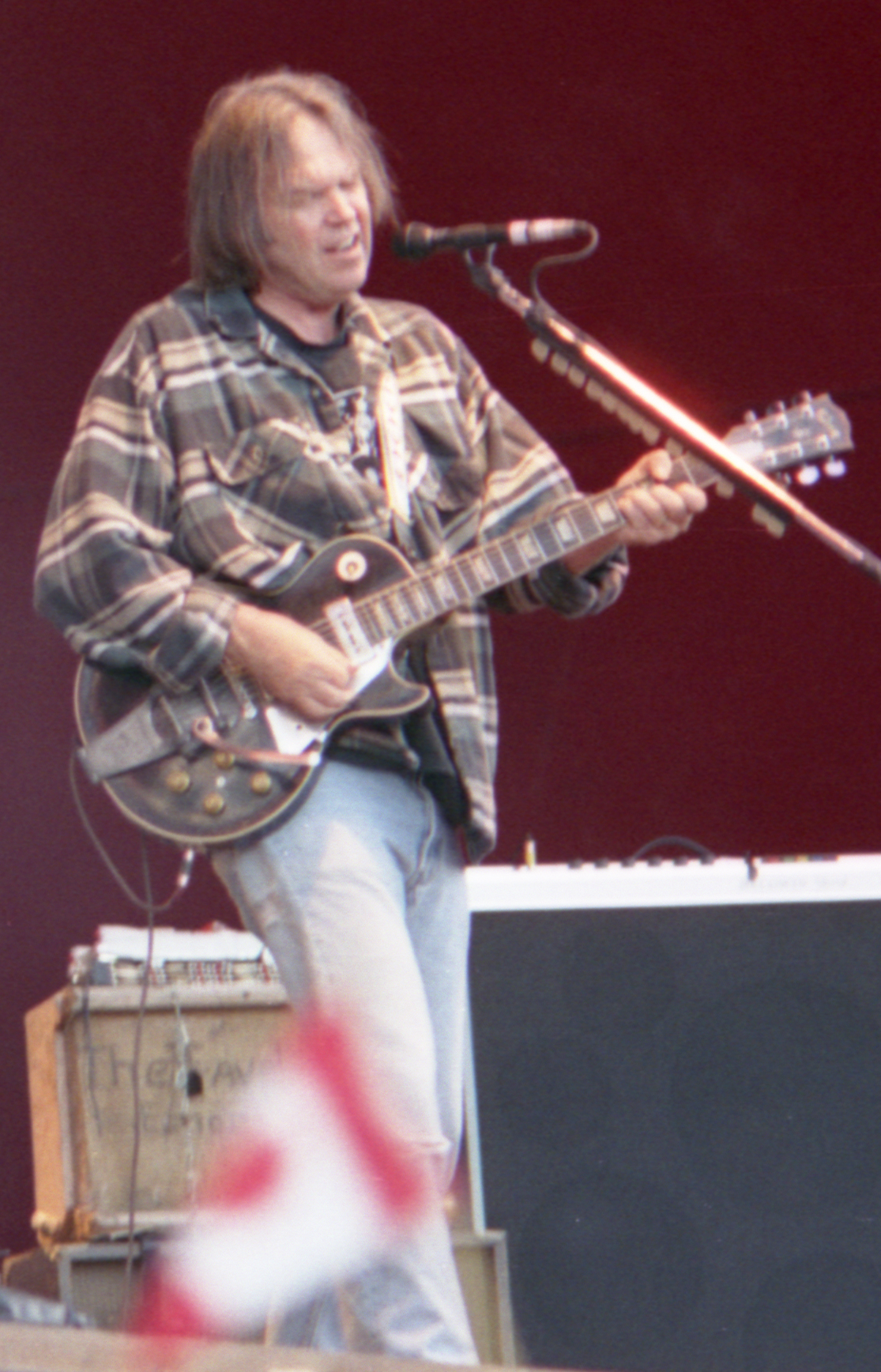
Young performing in 1996 in Turku, Finland

Young's 1989 single "Rockin' in the Free World", which hit No. 2 on the US mainstream-rock charts, and accompanied the album, Freedom, returned Young to the popular consciousness after a decade of sometimes-difficult genre experiments. The album's lyrics were often overtly political; "Rockin' in the Free World" deals with homelessness, terrorism, and environmental degradation, implicitly criticizing the government policies of President George H. W. Bush.

The use of heavy feedback and distortion on several Freedom tracks was reminiscent of the Rust Never Sleeps (1979) album and foreshadowed the imminent rise of grunge. The rising stars of the subgenre, including Nirvana's Kurt Cobain and Pearl Jam's Eddie Vedder, frequently cited Young as a major influence, contributing to his popular revival. A tribute album called The Bridge: A Tribute to Neil Young was released in 1989, featuring covers by a range of alternative and grunge acts, including Sonic Youth, Nick Cave, Soul Asylum, Dinosaur Jr, and the Pixies.

Young's 1990 album Ragged Glory, recorded with Crazy Horse in a barn on his Northern California ranch, continued this distortion-heavy aesthetic. Young toured for the album with Orange County, California country-punk band Social Distortion and Sonic Youth as support, much to the consternation of many of his old fans. Weld, a two-disc live album documenting the tour, was released in 1991. Sonic Youth's influence was evident on Arc, a 35-minute collage of feedback and distortion spliced together at the suggestion of Thurston Moore and originally packaged with some versions of Weld.

1992's Harvest Moon marked an abrupt return (prompted by Young's hyperacusis in the aftermath of the Weld tour) to the country and folk-rock stylings of Harvest and reunited him with some of the musicians from that album, including the core members of the Stray Gators and singers Linda Ronstadt and James Taylor. The title track was a minor hit, and the record was well received by critics, winning the Juno Award for Album of the Year in 1994. Young also contributed to lifelong friend Randy Bachman's nostalgic 1992 tune "Prairie Town", and garnered a 1993 Academy Award nomination for his song "Philadelphia", from the soundtrack of the Jonathan Demme movie of the same name. An MTV Unplugged performance and album emerged in 1993. Later that year, Young collaborated with Booker T. and the M.G.s for a summer tour of Europe and North America, with Blues Traveler, Soundgarden, and Pearl Jam also on the bill. Some European shows ended with a rendition of "Rockin' in the Free World" played with Pearl Jam, foreshadowing their eventual full-scale collaboration two years later.

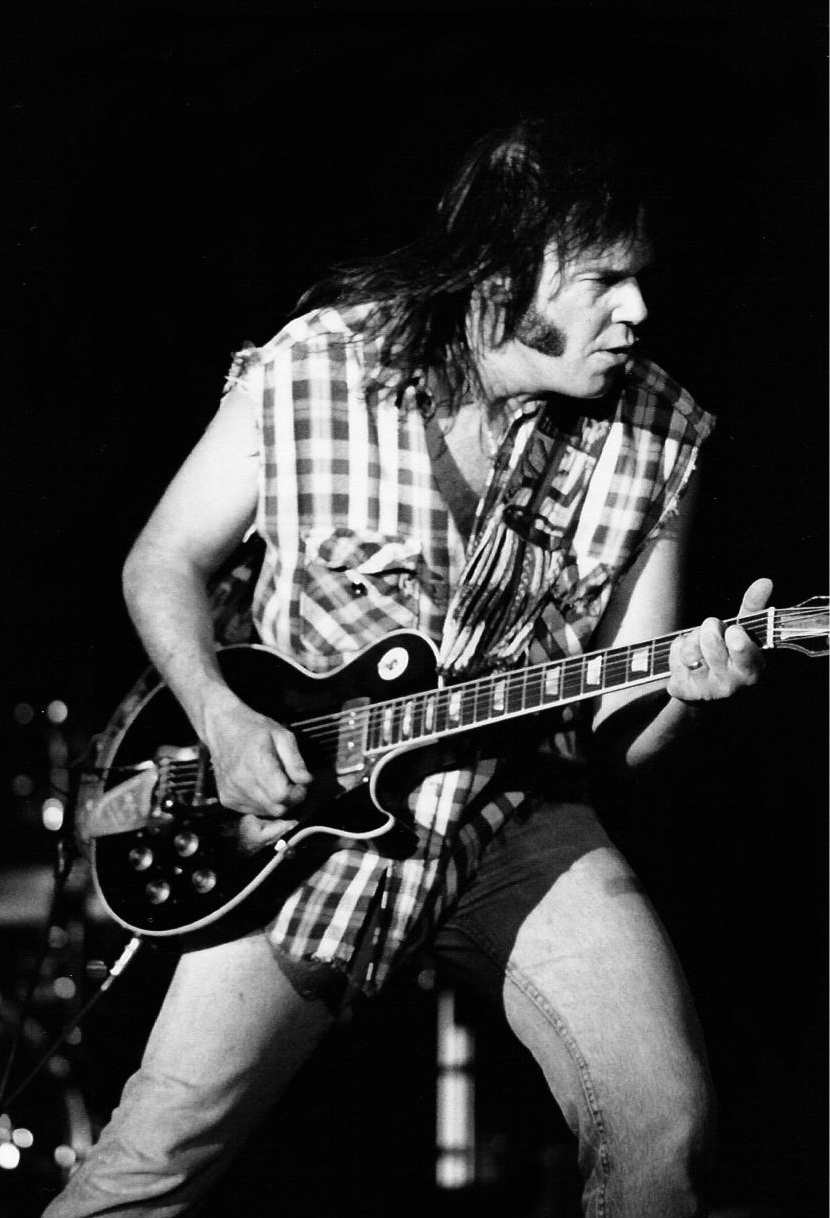
Young on stage in Barcelona

In 1994, Young again collaborated with Crazy Horse on Sleeps with Angels, a record whose dark, somber mood was influenced by Kurt Cobain's death earlier that year: the title track in particular dealt with Cobain's life and death without mentioning him by name. Cobain had quoted Young's lyric "It's better to burn out than fade away" (a line from "My My, Hey Hey") in his suicide note. Young had reportedly made repeated attempts to contact Cobain before his death. Young and Pearl Jam performed "Act of Love" at an abortion rights benefit along with Crazy Horse, and were present at a Rock and Roll Hall of Fame dinner, sparking interest in a collaboration between the two. Still enamored with the grunge scene, Young reconnected with Pearl Jam in 1995 for the live-in-the-studio album Mirror Ball and a tour of Europe with the band and producer Brendan O'Brien backing Young. 1995 also marked Young's induction into the Rock and Roll Hall of Fame, where he was inducted by Eddie Vedder.

Young has consistently demonstrated the unbridled passion of an artist who understands that self-renewal is the only way to avoid burning out. For this reason, he has remained one of the most significant artists of the rock and roll era.

— Rock and Roll Hall of Fame website.

In 1995, Young and his manager Elliot Roberts founded a record label, Vapor Records. It has released recordings by Tegan and Sara, Spoon, Jonathan Richman, Vic Chesnutt, Everest, Pegi Young, Jets Overhead, and Young himself, among others.

Young's next collaborative partner was the filmmaker Jim Jarmusch, who asked Young to compose a soundtrack to his 1995 black-and-white western film Dead Man. Young's instrumental soundtrack was improvised while he watched the film alone in a studio. The death of longtime mentor, friend, and producer David Briggs in late 1995 prompted Young to reconnect with Crazy Horse the next year for the album and tour Broken Arrow. A Jarmusch-directed concert film and live album of the tour, Year of the Horse, emerged in 1997. From 1996 to 1997, Young and Crazy Horse toured extensively throughout Europe and North America, including a stint as part of the H.O.R.D.E. Festival's sixth annual tour.

In 1998, Young renewed his collaboration with the rock band Phish, sharing the stage at the annual Farm Aid concert and then at Young's Bridge School Benefit, where he joined headliners Phish for renditions of "Helpless" and "I Shall Be Released". Phish declined Young's later invitation to be his backing band on his 1999 North American tour.

The decade ended with the release in late 1999 of Looking Forward, another reunion with Crosby, Stills, and Nash. The subsequent tour of the United States and Canada with the reformed quartet earned $42.1 million, making it the eighth largest grossing tour of 2000.

=== Health condition and new material (2000s) ===
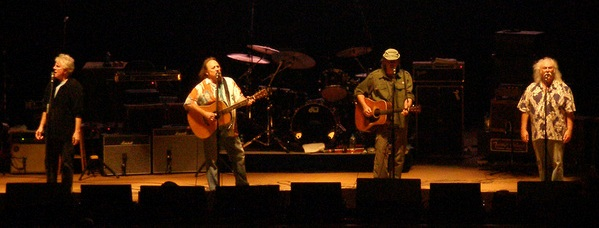
Crosby, Stills, Nash & Young perform at the PNC Bank Arts Center in 2006. (From L to R: Nash, Stills, Young, and Crosby)

Young continued to release new material at a rapid pace through the first decade of the new millennium. The studio album Silver & Gold and live album Road Rock Vol. 1 were released in 2000 and were both accompanied by live concert films. His 2001 single "Let's Roll" was a tribute to the victims of the September 11 attacks, and the effective action taken by the passengers and crew on Flight 93 in particular.

In 2003, Young released Greendale, a concept album recorded with Crazy Horse members Billy Talbot and Ralph Molina. The songs loosely revolved around the murder of a police officer in a small California town and its effects on the town's inhabitants. Under the pseudonym "Bernard Shakey", Young directed an accompanying film of the same name, featuring actors lip-synching to the music from the album. He toured extensively with the Greendale material throughout 2003 and 2004, first with a solo, acoustic version in Europe, then with a full-cast stage show in North America, Japan, and Australia. Young began using biodiesel on the 2004 Greendale tour, powering his trucks and tour buses with the fuel. "Our Greendale tour is now ozone friendly", he said. "I plan to continue to use this government approved and regulated fuel exclusively from now on to prove that it is possible to deliver the goods anywhere in North America without using foreign oil, while being environmentally responsible."

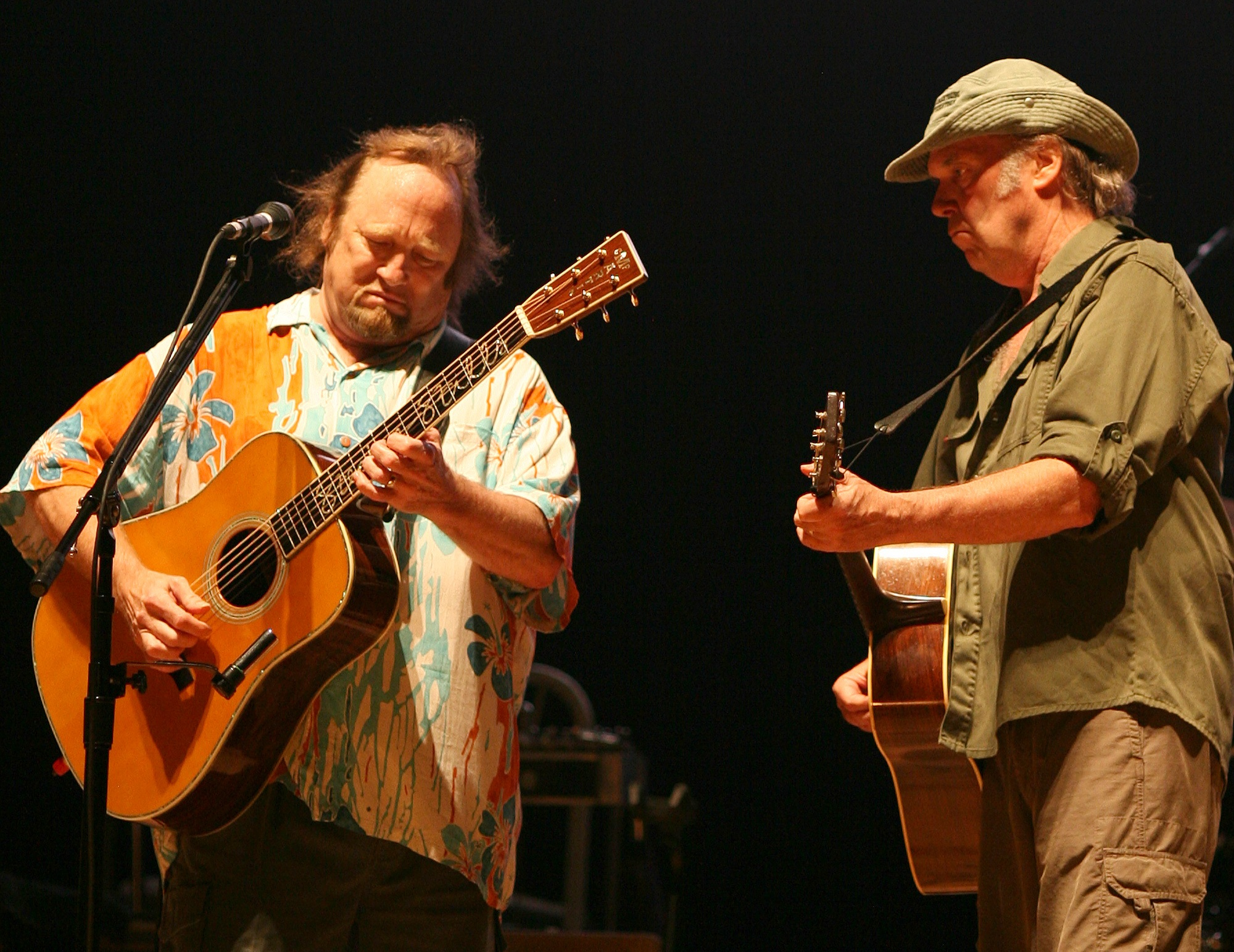
Stills and Young performing together on the Crosby, Stills, Nash & Young 2006 tour

==== 2005 health issues ====
In March 2005, while working on the Prairie Wind album in Nashville, Young was diagnosed with a brain aneurysm. He was treated successfully with a minimally invasive neuroradiological procedure and performed in a New York hospital on March 29, but passed out two days later on a New York street from bleeding from the femoral artery, which radiologists had used to access the aneurysm. The complication forced Young to cancel his scheduled appearance at the Juno Awards telecast in Winnipeg, but within months he was back on stage, appearing at the close of the Live 8 concert in Barrie, Ontario, on July 2. During the performance, he debuted a new song, a soft hymn called "When God Made Me". Young's brush with death influenced Prairie Wind's themes of retrospection and mortality.

==== Jonathan Demme concert film ====
A Jonathan Demme concert film from a 2007 concert at the Tower Theater in Upper Darby Township, Pennsylvania, called the Neil Young Trunk Show premiered on March 21, 2009, at the South by Southwest (SXSW) Film Conference and Festival in Austin, Texas. It was featured at the Cannes Film Festival on May 17, 2009, and was released in the US on March 19, 2010, to critical acclaim.

==== Glastonbury, Isle of Wight ====
In 2009, Young headlined the New Orleans Jazz and Heritage Festival, and Glastonbury Festival in Pilton, England, at Hard Rock Calling in London (where he was joined onstage by Paul McCartney for a rendition of "A Day in the Life") and, after years of unsuccessful booking attempts, the Isle of Wight Festival.

=== Increased environmental activism and Promise of the Real (2010s) ===
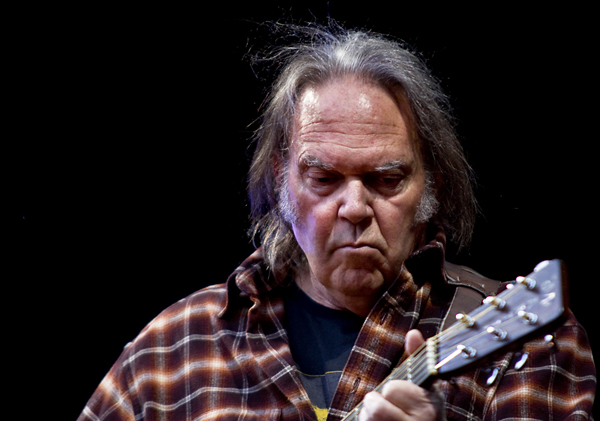
Young performing in Oslo, Norway, in 2009

In May 2010, it was revealed Young had begun working on a new studio album produced by Daniel Lanois. This was announced by David Crosby, who said that the album "will be a very heartfelt record. I expect it will be a very special record." On May 18, 2010, Young embarked upon a North American solo tour to promote his then upcoming album, Le Noise, playing a mix of older songs and new material. Although billed as a solo acoustic tour, Young also played some songs on electric guitars, including Old Black.

In September 2011, Jonathan Demme's third documentary film on the singer-songwriter, Neil Young Journeys, premiered at the Toronto International Film Festival.

Young and Crazy Horse released the album Americana on June 5, 2012. It was Young's first collaboration with Crazy Horse since the Greendale album and tour in 2003 and 2004. The record is a tribute to unofficial national anthems that jump from an uncensored version of "This Land Is Your Land" to "Clementine" and includes a version of "God Save the Queen", which Young grew up singing every day in school in Canada.

Americana is Young's first album entirely of cover songs. It debuted at number four on the Billboard 200, making it Young's highest-charting album in the US since Harvest. On June 5, 2012, American Songwriter reported that Young and Crazy Horse would be launching their first tour in eight years in support of the album.

On September 25, 2012, Young's autobiography Waging Heavy Peace: A Hippie Dream was released to critical and commercial acclaim. Reviewing the book for the New York Times, Janet Maslin reported that Young chose to write his memoirs in 2012 for two reasons: he needed to take a break from stage performances for health reasons but continue to generate income; and he feared the onset of dementia, considering his father's medical history and his own present condition. Maslin praised the book, describing it as frank but quirky and without pathos.

In November 2013, Young performed at the annual fundraiser for the Silverlake Conservatory of Music. Following the Red Hot Chili Peppers, he played an acoustic set to a crowd who had paid a minimum of $2,000 a seat to attend the benefit in the famous Paramour Mansion overlooking downtown Los Angeles.

Young released the album A Letter Home on April 19, 2014, through Jack White's record label, and his second memoir, Special Deluxe, which was released on October 14. He appeared with White on The Tonight Show Starring Jimmy Fallon on May 12, 2014.

Young released his 35th studio album, Storytone, on November 4, 2014. The first song released from the album, "Who's Gonna Stand Up?", was released in three different versions on September 25, 2014.

Storytone was followed in 2015 by his concept album The Monsanto Years. The Monsanto Years is an album themed both in support of sustainable farming and to protest the biotechnology company Monsanto. Young achieves this protest in a series of lyrical sentiments against genetically modified food production. He created this album in collaboration with Willie Nelson's sons, Lukas and Micah, and is also backed by Lukas's fellow band members from Promise of the Real. Additionally, Young released a film in tandem with the album, also called The Monsanto Years, that documents the album's recording, and can be streamed online. In August 2019, The Guardian reported that Monsanto was spying on Young and other environmental activists.

In summer 2015, Young undertook a North American tour titled the Rebel Content Tour. It began on July 5, at the Summerfest in Milwaukee, Wisconsin, and ended on July 24, at the Wayhome Festival in Oro-Medonte, Ontario. Lukas Nelson & Promise of the Real were special guests for the tour.

In October 2016, Young performed at Desert Trip in Indio, California, and announced his 37th studio album, Peace Trail, recorded with drummer Jim Keltner and bass guitarist Paul Bushnell, which was released that December.

On September 8, 2017, Young released Hitchhiker, a studio LP recorded on August 11, 1976, at Indigo Studios in Malibu. The album features ten songs that Young recorded accompanied by acoustic guitar or piano. While different versions of most of the songs have been previously released, the album includes two never-before-released songs: "Hawaii" and "Give Me Strength", which Young has occasionally performed live.

On July 4, 2017, Young released the song "Children of Destiny", which appeared on his next album. On November 3, 2017, he released "Already Great", a song from The Visitor, an album he recorded with Promise of the Real and released on December 1, 2017.

On Record Store Day, April 21, 2018, Warner Records released a two-vinyl LP special edition of Roxy: Tonight's the Night Live, a double live album of a show that Young performed in September 1973 at the Roxy in West Hollywood, with the Santa Monica Flyers. The album is labeled "Volume 05" in Young's Performance Series.

On October 19, 2018, Young released a live version of his song "Campaigner", an excerpt from a forthcoming archival live album, Songs for Judy, which features solo performances recorded during a November 1976 tour with Crazy Horse. It was the first release from his new label Shakey Pictures Records.

In December 2018, Young criticized the promoters of a London show for selecting Barclays Bank as a sponsor. He objected to the bank's association with fossil fuels. Young said he was trying to rectify the situation by finding a different sponsor.

On August 19, 2019, Young and Crazy Horse announced the release later that month of the song "Rainbow of Colors", the first single from the album Colorado, Young's first new record with the band since 2012's Psychedelic Pill. Young, multi-instrumentalist Nils Lofgren, bassist Billy Talbot and drummer Ralph Molina recorded the album with Young's co-producer, John Hanlon, in spring 2019. Colorado was released on October 25, 2019, on Reprise Records. On August 30, 2019, Young unveiled "Milky Way", the first song from Colorado, a love ballad he had performed several times at concerts – both solo acoustic and with Promise of the Real.

=== Continued work with Crazy Horse and forming the Chrome Hearts (2020s) ===
In February 2020, Young wrote an open letter to President Trump, calling him a "disgrace to my country". On August 4, 2020, Young filed a copyright infringement lawsuit against Trump's reelection campaign for the use of his music at campaign rallies.

In April 2020, Young announced that he was working on a new archival album, Road of Plenty, comprising music made with Crazy Horse in 1986 and rehearsals for his 1989 Saturday Night Live appearance. On June 19, Young released a "lost" album, Homegrown. He recorded it in the mid-1970s following his breakup with Carrie Snodgress, but opted not to release it at the time, feeling it was too personal. In September, Young released a live EP, The Times. Young shared the news via his video for his new song "Lookin' for a Leader", stating: "I invite the President to play this song at his next rally. A song about the feelings many of us have about America today."

Young and Crazy Horse released a new album, Barn, on December 10, 2021. The first single, "Song of the Seasons", was released on October 15, followed by "Welcome Back" on December 3, along with a music video. A stand-alone will be released on Blu-ray and will be directed by Daryl Hannah. Young also confirmed that he had completed his third book, Canary, his first work of fiction.

On January 24, 2022, Young posted an open letter threatening to remove his music from the audio streaming service Spotify if it did not remove the Joe Rogan Experience podcast. Young accused the podcast of spreading COVID-19 misinformation on December 31, writing, "Spotify has a responsibility to mitigate the spread of misinformation on its platform". On January 26, Young's music was removed from Spotify. A Spotify spokesperson said that Spotify wanted "all the world's music and audio content to be available to Spotify users" and that it had a "great responsibility in balancing both safety for listeners and freedom for creators". In solidarity, artists including Joni Mitchell and the members of Crosby, Stills, and Nash also removed their music from Spotify. The Director-General of the World Health Organization, Tedros Adhanom Ghebreyesus, praised Young. In March 2024, Young returned his music to Spotify, as the end of Joe Rogan's contract meant Rogan could add The Joe Rogan Experience to other streaming platforms, such as Apple Music and Amazon Music. Young said he could not sustain his opposition on each of the platforms.

In 2023, Young criticized Ticketmaster's practice of raising ticket prices and adding fees. He said he had been sent letters from fans blaming him for $3,000 tickets for a benefit concert he was performing, and that "artists have to worry about ripped off fans blaming them for Ticketmaster add-ons and scalpers".

In April and May 2024, Young returned to touring with Crazy Horse for the first time in ten years (for their Love Earth Tour), and unveiled a "lost" verse from "Cortez the Killer" that had been unknown for years. Micah Nelson, son of Willie Nelson, joined Crazy Horse for the tour, as Nils Lofgren was busy touring with Bruce Springsteen as a member of the E Street Band. In May, two members of the group became ill, and Young announced that the remainder of their tour (including dates in July and festivals in September) would be canceled indefinitely.

Young provided guest vocals on the song "My Plane Leaves Tomorrow (Au Revoir)" from Al Jardine's 2025 EP, Islands in the Sun. Red Hot Chili Peppers bass guitarist Flea also performs trumpet on the song.

On October 8, 2025, Young announced on his website his decision to remove his music catalog from Amazon Music in protest of Amazon and its founder, Jeff Bezos, whom he accused of supporting a U.S. government that neglects public welfare and contributes to issues like government shutdowns. Young urged fans to boycott Amazon and support local businesses instead, framing the move as resistance to corporate control.

==== The Chrome Hearts ====
In late 2024, Young began playing with a new backing band, the Chrome Hearts. The band consists of Promise of the Real members Micah Nelson (guitar), Corey McCormick (bass), and Anthony Logerfo (drums), and organist Spooner Oldham. They released their debut single, "Big Change", in January 2025, with producer John Hanlon calling the song "in your face loud irreverent rock'n'roll paint splatter on the canvas in the vein of a Jackson Pollack [sic] painting." The song was featured on the album Talkin to the Trees, credited to Neil Young and the Chrome Hearts, and was released several months later on June 13, 2025 as the band's debut album. The album's second single, "Let's Roll Again", was released on May 2, 2025 and takes a direct shot at Elon Musk and Tesla, Inc.

On June 28, 2025, Young headlined at the Glastonbury Festival, with the set being broadcast live by the BBC, after an initial embargo placed by Young. Alexis Petridis of The Guardian said of the band, "They may well be the best backing band Young has assembled since Crazy Horse, their sound simultaneously tumultuous and lumbering and heavily distorted."

Neil Young's "Big Crime" premiered with the Chrome Hearts on August 27, 2025, at Chicago's Huntington Bank Pavilion, directly targeting Donald Trump's deployment of National Guard troops and federal agents in Washington, D.C. With lyrics proclaiming "There's big crime in D.C. at the White House", "Don't want soldiers on our streets", and "Got to get the fascists out, got to clean the White House out", the song combines Young's signature protest rock style with explicit criticism of government overreach and the political climate, continuing his long legacy of using music as a platform for social and political commentary.

On April 21, 2026, Young announced that he had recorded with the Chrome Hearts a new 8-track studio album titled Second Song due to include three unreleased original tracks dating back to 1963. Young explained that the creative process began several months earlier when he spent several days composing new lyrics and melodies in the early morning hours. The recording sessions began under a full moon in early March 2026 at Rick Rubin's Shangri-La Studios in Malibu. Five new songs were recorded during the first two days of the recording session. A search of the archives discovered previously unreleased early material: indeed, three songs he had written in 1963 had remained unreleased. The final mixing and mastering were completed in April 2026 under another full moon. Young also explained that he tried to do something he had never done: record digital and analog masters at the same time to show the difference, two versions due to both be released.

== Archives project ==
Since 2006, Young has been maintaining the Neil Young Archives, a project which encompasses the release of live albums, starting in 2006 with Live at the Fillmore East, box sets of live and studio material, starting in 2009 with The Archives Vol. 1 1963–1972, as well as video releases. As of 2019, the project has evolved into a subscription website and application where all of his music is available to stream in high-resolution audio. Neil Young Archives also includes his newspaper, The Times-Contrarian, The Hearse Theater, and photographs and memorabilia from throughout his career.

== Activism, philanthropy, and humanitarian efforts ==
Young has been a lifelong committed environmentalist and outspoken advocate for the welfare of small farmers, having co-founded in 1985 the benefit concert Farm Aid.

=== Farm Aid ===
Young remains on the board of directors of Farm Aid, an organization he co-founded with Willie Nelson and John Mellencamp in 1985. According to its website, it is the longest-running concert benefit series in the US and has raised $43 million since its first benefit concert in 1985. Each year, Young co-hosts and performs with well-known guest performers including Dave Matthews and producers including Evelyn Shriver and Mark Rothbaum, at the Farm Aid annual benefit concerts to raise funds and provide grants to family farms and prevent foreclosures, provide a crisis hotline, and create and promote homegrown farm food in the United States.

=== Bridge School ===
In 1986, Young helped found the Bridge School, an educational organization for children with severe verbal and physical disabilities, and its annual supporting Bridge School Benefit concerts, together with his then-wife Pegi Young.

=== Songwriting activism ===
Young had never been a stranger to eco-friendly lyrics, but themes of environmentalist spirituality and activism became increasingly prominent in his work throughout the 1990s and 2000s, especially on Greendale (2003) and Living with War (2006). The trend continued on 2007's Chrome Dreams II, with lyrics exploring Young's personal eco-spirituality.

Young's renewed activism manifested itself in the 2006 album Living with War, which like the much earlier song "Ohio", was recorded and released in less than a month as a direct result of current events. Most of the album's songs rebuked the Bush administration's policy of war by examining its human costs to soldiers, their loved ones, and civilians, but Young also included a few songs on other themes and an outright protest song, "Let's Impeach the President", in which he asserted that Bush had lied to lead the country into war.

=== LincVolt hybrid electric car ===
In 2008, Young revealed the production of a hybrid-engine 1959 Lincoln called LincVolt. A new album loosely based on the Lincvolt project, Fork in the Road, was released on April 7, 2009.

=== Indigenous rights, Fossil Fuel, and Old Growth logging activism ===
Young has been a vocal opponent of the proposed Keystone XL oil pipeline, which would run from Alberta to Texas. When discussing the environmental impact on the oilsands of Fort McMurray, Alberta, Young asserted that the area now resembles the Japanese city of Hiroshima in the aftermath of the atomic bomb attack of World War II.

Young has referred to issues surrounding the proposed use of oil pipelines as "scabs on our lives". In an effort to become more involved, Young has worked directly with the Athabasca Chipewyan First Nation to draw attention to this issue, performing benefit concerts and speaking publicly on the subject. In 2014, he played four shows in Canada dedicated to the Honor the Treaties movement, raising money for the Athabasca Chipewyan legal defense fund.

In 2015, he and Willie Nelson held a festival in Neligh, Nebraska, called Harvest the Hope, raising awareness of the impact of oilsands and oil pipelines on Native Americans and family farmers. Both received honors from leaders of the Rosebud Sioux, Oglala Lakota, Ponca and Omaha nations, and were invested with sacred buffalo robes.

Young participated in the Blue Dot Tour, which was organized and fronted by environmental activist David Suzuki, and toured all 10 Canadian provinces alongside other Canadian artists, including the Barenaked Ladies, Feist, and Robert Bateman. The intent of Young's participation in this tour was to raise awareness of the environmental damage caused by the exploitation of oilsands. Young has argued that the amount of CO_{2} released as a byproduct of oil and oil extraction is equivalent to the amount released by the total number of cars in Canada each day.

Young has faced criticism from representatives from within the Canadian petroleum industry, who have claimed that his statements are irresponsible. Young's opposition to the construction of oil pipelines has influenced his music as well. His song, "Who's Going to Stand Up?" was written to protest this issue, and features the lyric "Ban fossil fuel and draw the line / Before we build one more pipeline".

In addition to directly criticizing members of the oil industry, Young has also focused blame on the actions of the Canadian government for ignoring the environmental impacts of climate change. He referred to Canadian Prime Minister Stephen Harper as "an embarrassment to many Canadians ... [and] a very poor imitation of the George Bush administration in the United States". Young was also critical of Barack Obama's government for failing to uphold the promises made regarding environmental policies during his election campaign.

=== Anti-logging of Old Growth protests ===
In 2023, Young and Daryl Hannah travelled by train to Victoria on short notice to offer their support to 1,200 Old Growth activists who had been arrested unlawfully at the Fairy Creek old-growth logging protests. Young played a short set to draw attention to the issue and hearten the activists, some of whom had been pepper-sprayed and assaulted by RCMP officers, trying to protect the last at-risk intact watershed of Old Growth in southern BC.

Young recorded "A Rock Star Bucks a Coffee Shop" in response to Starbucks' possible involvement with Monsanto and use of genetically modified food. The song was included on his 2015 concept album The Monsanto Years.

Young is a member of the Canadian charity Artists Against Racism.

== Artistry ==
Stephen Thomas Erlewine of AllMusic said that the styles Young explored throughout his career range from "acoustic introspection and wistful country-rock to blistering hard rock, electronic experimentation, blues, rockabilly, and heartfelt polemics" while employing his "engagingly craggy voice." He noted Young's various guises as "lone folk-rock troubadour", as purveyor of "noisy, rambling wanderings with Crazy Horse", and as "electro" experimenter.

== Instruments ==
=== Guitars ===
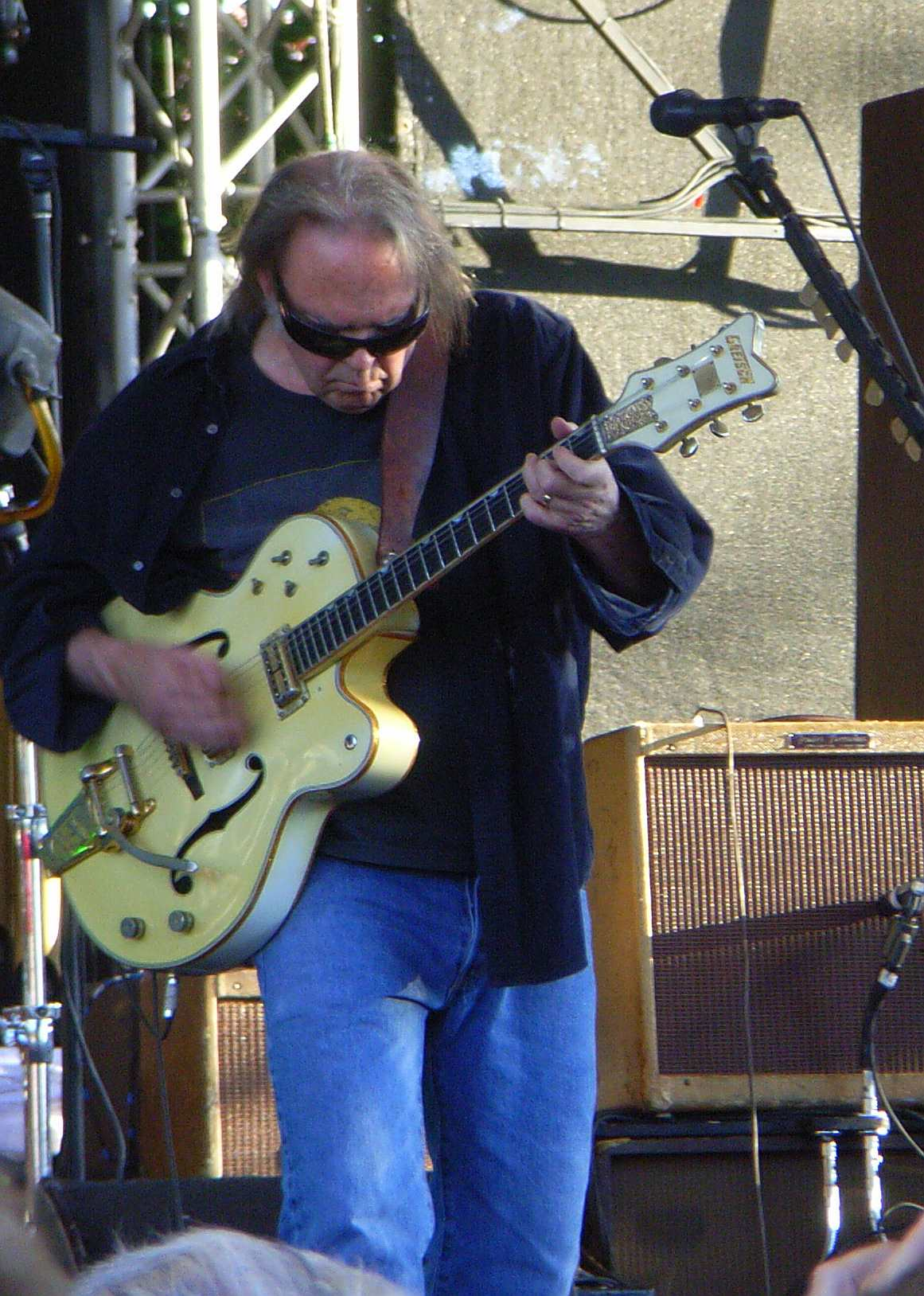
Young playing a Gretsch White Falcon in Cologne, June 19, 2009

In 2003, Rolling Stone listed Young as eighty-third in its ranking of "The 100 Greatest Guitarists of All Time" (although in a more recent version of the list, he has been moved up to seventeenth place), describing him as a "restless experimenter ... who transform[s] the most obvious music into something revelatory". Young is a collector of second-hand guitars, but in recording and performing, he frequently uses just a few instruments, as is explained by his longtime guitar technician Larry Cragg in the film Neil Young: Heart of Gold. They include:

- a 1953 Gibson Les Paul named "Old Black" acquired in early 1968 in a trade with then Buffalo Springfield bassist, arranger, and engineer Jim Messina. It began as a Goldtop that has been customized extensively over the years. Aside from replacing the (non-standard as of 1953) stop-tailpiece with a Bigsby B-3 vibrato tailpiece, by 1969 the guitar had changed little from what Messina handed him. It was featured prominently on a host of Springfield demos and was the sole electric guitar used on Young's first solo LP. According to personal hands-on testimony, acquired during the Crazy Horse gig at the Troubadour on April 22, 1969, (w/ sit-in by Stephen Stills) the guitar sported a Rowe-De Armond M5-A bridge coil, Bigsby B-3 vibrato tailpiece, a (shaved, non-standard) ABR-1 Tune-o-matic bridge, chromed brass pickguard, truss rod cover plate and aluminum cover on the neck P-90 coil, Grover C-102 'Roto-matic tuners, an added 1/8" ebony headstock facia with thin crème binding, pearl inlays of the Gibson logo, the 335 'wheat-stack' and a lustrous black lacquer over-spray on the entire neck and body.
- a late 1950s Gretsch White Falcon purchased by Young near the end of the Buffalo Springfield era. In 1969, he bought a version of the same vintage guitar from Stephen Stills, and this instrument is featured prominently during Young's early 1970s period, and can be heard on tracks like "Ohio", "Southern Man", "Alabama", "Words (Between the Lines of Age)", and "L.A.". It was Young's primary electric guitar during the Harvest (1972) era, since Young's deteriorating back condition (eventually fixed with surgery) made playing the much heavier Les Paul (a favorite of his named Old Black) difficult.

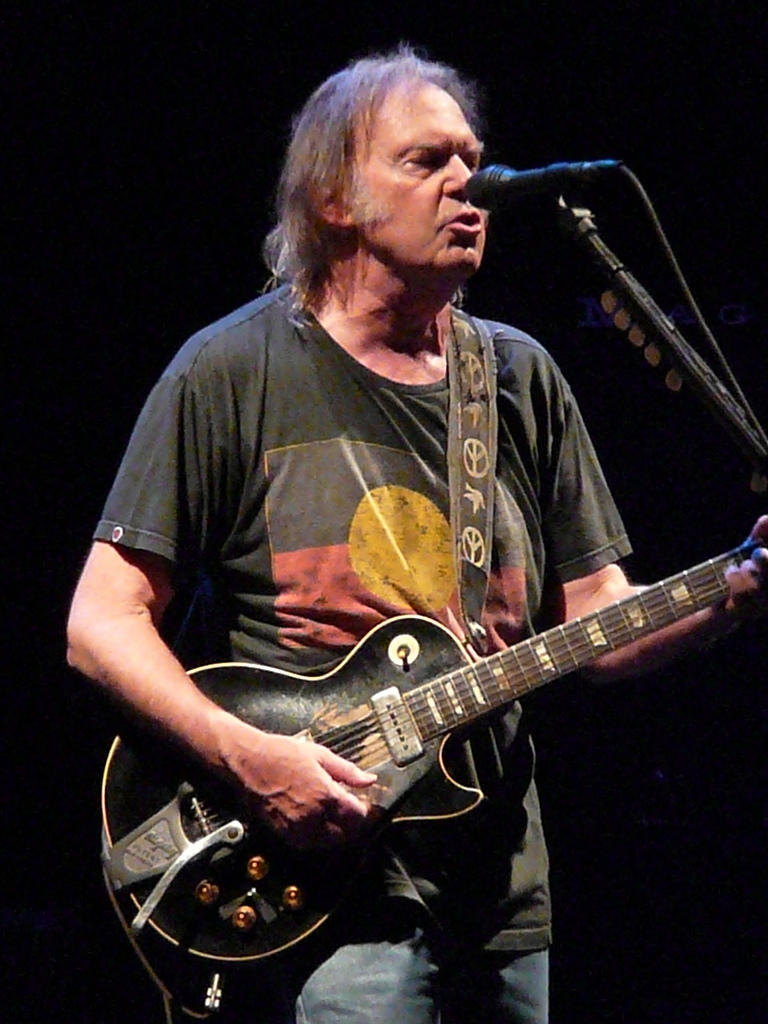
Neil playing Old Black in Nottingham, 2009

=== Reed organ ===
Young owns a restored Estey reed organ, serial number 167272, dating from 1885, which he frequently plays in concert.

=== Crystallophone ===
Young owns a glass harmonica, which he played in the recording of "I Do" on his 2019 album Colorado.

=== Amplification ===
Young uses various vintage Fender Tweed Deluxe amplifiers. His preferred amplifier for electric guitar is the Fender Deluxe, specifically a Tweed-era model from 1959. He purchased his first vintage Deluxe in 1967 for US$50 (US$480 in 2025 dollars) from Sol Betnun Music on Larchmont in Hollywood and has since acquired nearly 450 different examples, all from the same era, but he maintains that it is the original model that sounds superior and is crucial to his trademark sound.

A notable and unique accessory to Young's Deluxe is the Whizzer, a device created specifically for Young by Rick Davis, which physically changes the amplifier's settings to pre-set combinations. This device is connected to footswitches operable by Young onstage in the manner of an effects pedal. Tom Wheeler's book The Soul of Tone highlights the device on pages 182–183.

== Personal life ==
Young's family was from Manitoba, where both his parents were born and married. Young himself was born in Toronto, Ontario, and lived there at various times in his early life (1945, 1957, 1959–1960, 1966–1967), as well as Omemee (1945–1952) and Pickering, Ontario (1956) before settling with his mother in Winnipeg, Manitoba (1958, 1960–1966), where his music career began and which he considers his "hometown". After becoming successful, he bought properties in California. Young had a home in Malibu, California, that burned to the ground in the 2018 Woolsey Fire. He had lived outside Canada since 1967, before returning in 2020.

Young owned Broken Arrow Ranch, a property of about 1,000 acres (400 ha) near La Honda, California, which he purchased in 1970 for $350,000 ($2.9 million in 2025 dollars); the property was subsequently expanded to thousands of acres. He moved out and gave Pegi Young the ranch after their divorce in 2014. Young's son Ben lives there.

=== Citizenship ===
Young announced in 2019 that his application for United States citizenship had been held up because of his use of marijuana. In 2020, the issue was resolved and he became a United States citizen. Almost immediately upon gaining US citizenship, Young returned to living in Canada for the first time in over half a century, as he and Daryl Hannah moved to a cottage near Omemee, the town where he lived from shortly after his birth until the age of 7.

=== Marriages and relationships ===
Young married his first wife, restaurant owner Susan Acevedo, in December 1968. They were together until October 1970, when she filed for divorce.

From late 1970 to 1975, Young was in a relationship with the actress Carrie Snodgress. The song "A Man Needs a Maid" from Harvest is inspired by his seeing her in the film Diary of a Mad Housewife. They met soon afterward, and she moved in with him on his ranch in northern California. They have a son, Zeke, who was born on September 8, 1972 and has been diagnosed with cerebral palsy.

Young met his next wife, Pegi Young (née Morton), in 1974, when she was working as a waitress at The Mountain House near his ranch, a story he tells in the 1992 song "Unknown Legend". They married in August 1978 and had two children together, Ben and Amber. Ben has been diagnosed with cerebral palsy and Amber with epilepsy. The couple were musical collaborators and co-founders of the Bridge School, in 1986. They divorced in 2014 after 36 years of marriage. Pegi died on January 1, 2019.

In 2014, Young began dating actress Daryl Hannah. The couple wed on August 25, 2018, in Atascadero, California.

Young has been widely reported as the godfather of actress Amber Tamblyn. In a 2009 interview with Parade, Tamblyn explained how “godfather" in this context was informal, and was "just a loose term" to describe three friends of her father Russ Tamblyn who were important influences on her life: Young, Dennis Hopper, and Dean Stockwell.

Young has always been close with his half sister and fellow musician Astrid Young, buying her first amplifier and collaborating over the past decades.

== Business ventures ==
Young was part owner of Lionel, LLC, a company that makes toy trains and model railroad accessories. In 2008 Lionel emerged from bankruptcy and his shares of the company were wiped out. He was instrumental in the design of the Lionel Legacy control system for model trains, and remains on the board of directors of Lionel. He has been named as co-inventor on seven US patents related to model trains.

=== PonoMusic ===
Young has long held that the digital audio formats in which most people download music are deeply flawed, and do not provide the rich, warm sound of analog recordings. He claims to be acutely aware of the difference, and compares it with taking a shower in tiny ice cubes versus ordinary water. Young and his company PonoMusic developed Pono, a music download service and dedicated music player focusing on "high-quality" uncompressed digital audio. It was designed to compete against highly compressed MP3 type formats. Pono promised to present songs "as they first sound during studio recording". The service and the sale of the player were launched in October 2014 and discontinued in April 2017.

=== Back catalog sale ===
In January 2021, Young sold 50% of the rights to his back catalog to the British investment company Hipgnosis Songs Fund. The value was estimated to be at least $150 million.

== Legacy ==
Young's political outspokenness and social awareness influenced artists such as Blind Melon, Phish, Pearl Jam, and Nirvana. Young is referred to as the "godfather of grunge" for his influence on Kurt Cobain and Eddie Vedder and the grunge movement. Vedder inducted Young into the Rock and Roll Hall of Fame in 1995. Johnny Marr has cited Young as one of the main influences on his trademark jangly guitarwork. Thom Yorke of Radiohead said After the Gold Rush gave him the confidence to reveal "softness and naiveté" in vocals. He also credited Young as a lyrical influence. He said: "It was his attitude toward the way he laid songs down. It's always about laying down whatever is in your head at the time and staying completely true to that, no matter what it is."

The Australian rock group Powderfinger named themselves after Young's song "Powderfinger" from Rust Never Sleeps (1979). The members of the Constantines occasionally played Neil Young tribute shows under the name Horsey Craze. Other bands and artists who have cited Young as an influence include Smoke Fairies who covered Young's "Alabama" on Harvest Revisited, Sonic Youth, Dinosaur Jr., Meat Puppets, Teenage Fanclub, Nada Surf frontman Matthew Caws, and Feeder singer Grant Nicholas. Jason Bond, an East Carolina University biologist, discovered a new species of trapdoor spider in 2007 and named it Myrmekiaphila neilyoungi after Young, his favorite singer.

== Discography ==
- Neil Young (1968)
- Everybody Knows This Is Nowhere (1969) (with Crazy Horse)
- After the Gold Rush (1970)
- Harvest (1972) (with The Stray Gators)
- Journey Through The Past (1972)
- Time Fades Away (1973) (with The Stray Gators)
- On the Beach (1974)
- Tonight's the Night (1975)
- Zuma (1975) (with Crazy Horse)
- Long May You Run (1976) (credited to The Stills–Young Band)
- American Stars 'n Bars (1977)
- Comes a Time (1978)
- Rust Never Sleeps (1979) (with Crazy Horse)
- Hawks & Doves (1980)
- Re·ac·tor (1981) (with Crazy Horse)
- Trans (1983)
- Everybody's Rockin' (1983) (with the Shocking Pinks)
- Old Ways (1985)
- Landing on Water (1986)
- Life (1987) (with Crazy Horse)
- This Note's for You (1988) (with the Bluenotes)
- Freedom (1989)
- Ragged Glory (1990) (with Crazy Horse)
- Harvest Moon (1992) (with The Stray Gators)
- Sleeps with Angels (1994) (with Crazy Horse)
- Mirror Ball (1995) (with Pearl Jam)
- Broken Arrow (1996) (with Crazy Horse)
- Silver & Gold (2000)
- Are You Passionate? (2002) (with Booker T. & the M.G.'s)
- Greendale (2003) (with Crazy Horse)
- Prairie Wind (2005)
- Living with War (2006)
- Chrome Dreams II (2007)
- Fork in the Road (2009)
- Le Noise (2010)
- Americana (2012) (with Crazy Horse)
- Psychedelic Pill (2012) (with Crazy Horse)
- A Letter Home (2014)
- Storytone (2014)
- The Monsanto Years (2015) (with Promise of the Real)
- Peace Trail (2016)
- Hitchhiker (2017, recorded 1976)
- The Visitor (2017) (with Promise of the Real)
- Colorado (2019) (with Crazy Horse)
- Homegrown (2020, recorded 1974–75)
- Barn (2021) (with Crazy Horse)
- Toast (2022, recorded 2001) (with Crazy Horse)
- World Record (2022) (with Crazy Horse)
- Chrome Dreams (2023, recorded 1974–77) (with Crazy Horse)
- Early Daze (2024, recorded 1969) (with Crazy Horse)
- Oceanside Countryside (2025, recorded 1977)
- Talkin to the Trees (2025) (with Chrome Hearts)
- Second Song (2026) (with Chrome Hearts)

== Awards ==
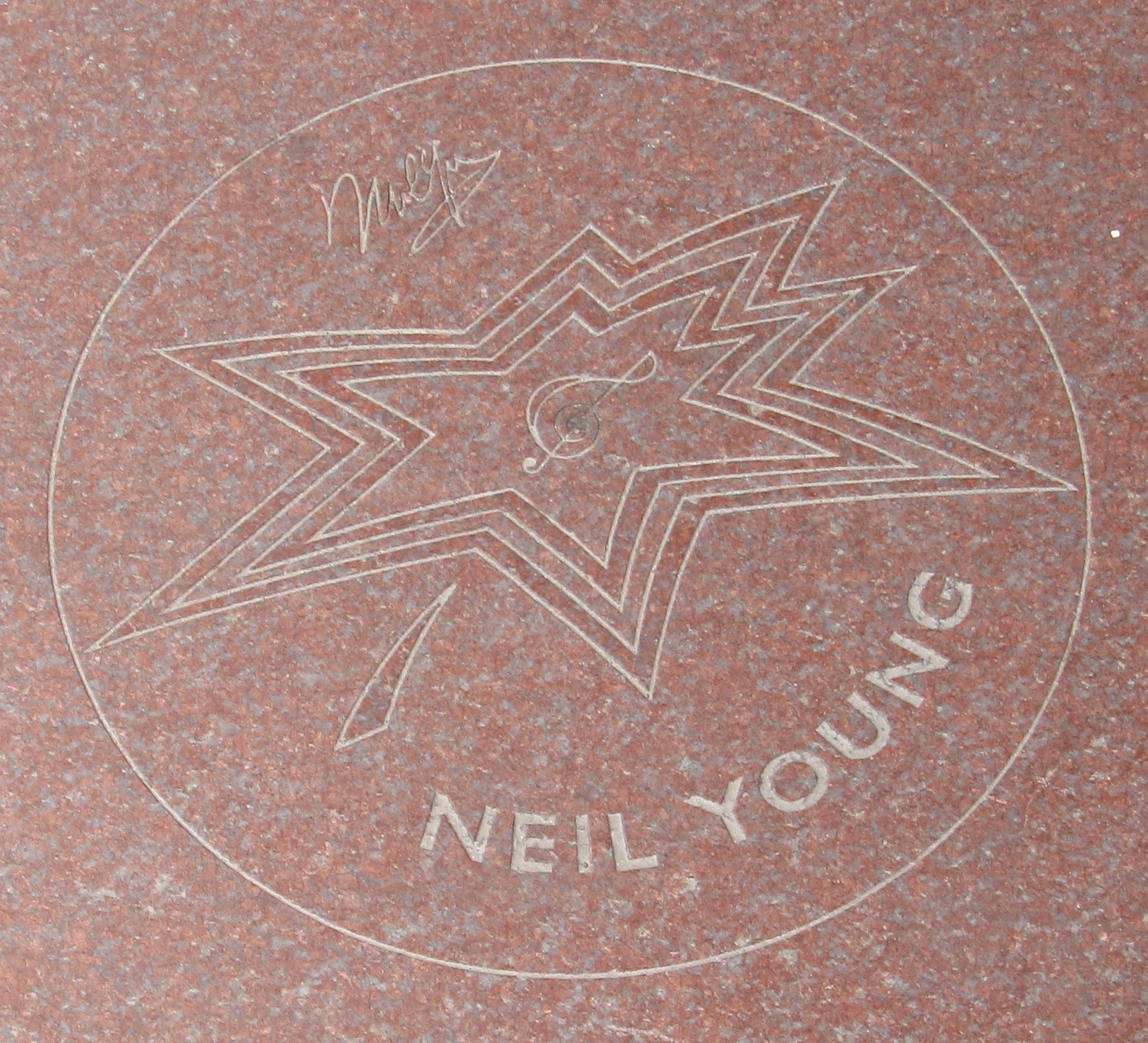
Young's star on Canada's Walk of Fame

As one of the founders of Farm Aid (1985–), he remains an active member of the board of directors. For one weekend each October, in Mountain View, California, Young and his ex-wife hosted the Bridge School Concerts, which drew international talent and sell-out crowds for nearly two decades. He announced in June 2017, however, that he would no longer host the concerts.

Rolling Stone magazine in 2000, ranked Young thirty-fourth in its list of the 100 greatest artists of all time. In 2000, Young was inducted into Canada's Walk of Fame.

In 2003, Rolling Stone's 500 Greatest Albums of All Time list included After the Gold Rush at number 71, Harvest at number 78, Déjà Vu (with Crosby, Stills, Nash & Young) at number 148, Everybody Knows This Is Nowhere at number 208, Tonight's the Night at number 331, and Rust Never Sleeps at number 350. The 2023 updated version of this list includes Everybody Knows This Is Nowhere at 407, On The Beach at 311, Tonight's the Night at 302, Rust Never Sleeps at 296, Déjà Vu at 220, After the Gold Rush at 90, and Harvest at 72. In 2004, on their 500 Greatest Songs of All Time list, Rolling Stone included "Rockin' in the Free World" at number 214, "Heart of Gold" at number 297, "Cortez the Killer" at number 321, and "Ohio" (with Crosby, Stills, Nash & Young) at number 385. In their updated 2021 version, Neil Young appears with "Heart of Gold" at number 259, "After the Gold Rush" at 322, and "Powderfinger" at 450.

In 2006, when Paste magazine compiled a "Greatest Living Songwriters" list, Young was ranked second behind Bob Dylan. (While Young and Dylan have occasionally played together in concert, they have never collaborated on a song together or played on each other's records). He ranked thirty-ninth on VH1's 100 Greatest Artist of Hard Rock that same year. The Rock and Roll Hall of Fame explained that while Young has "avoided sticking to one style for very long, the unifying factors throughout Young's peripatetic musical journey have been his unmistakable voice, his raw and expressive guitar playing, and his consummate songwriting skill."

After the Gold Rush, Harvest, Déjà Vu, and "Ohio" have all been inducted into the Grammy Hall of Fame.

In 2001, Young was awarded the Spirit of Liberty award by the civil liberties group People for the American Way. Young was honored as the MusiCares Person of the Year on January 29, 2010, two nights before the 52nd Annual Grammy Awards. He was also nominated for two Grammy Awards: Best Solo Rock Vocal Performance for "Fork in the Road" and Best Boxed or Special Limited Edition Package for Neil Young Archives Vol. 1 (1963–1972). Young won the latter Grammy Award. In 2010, he was ranked No. 26 in Gibson.com's Top 50 Guitarists of All Time.

In 2022, Young was named by Carnegie Corporation of New York as an honoree of the Great Immigrants Award.

In 2023, Rolling Stone ranked Young at number 133 on its list of the 200 Greatest Singers of All Time.

Other honors include:

- Canadian Music Hall of Fame, 1982
- Rock and Roll Hall of Fame He has been inducted into the Rock and Roll Hall of Fame twice: first in 1995 for his solo work and in 1997 as a member of Buffalo Springfield.
- In 2006, Artist of the Year by the American Music Association.

Albums recorded in tribute to Young by various artists include:

- 1989 – The Bridge: A Tribute to Neil Young, Caroline
- 1994 – Borrowed Tunes: A Tribute to Neil Young, Sony Music Canada, 2xCD acoustic and electric
- 1999 – This Note's for You Too!: A Tribute to Neil Young, Inbetweens Records 2xCD
- 2000 – Getting' High on Neil Young: A Bluegrass Tribute, CMH Records (same as 1998 entry)
- 2001 – Everybody Knows This Is Norway: A Norwegian Tribute to Neil Young, Switch Off Records
- 2001 – Mirrorball Songs – A Tribute to Neil Young, SALD, Japan
- 2006 – Headed for the Ditch: a Michigan Tribute to Neil Young, Lower Peninsula Records 2xLP
- 2007 – Borrowed Tunes II: A Tribute to Neil Young, 2xCD acoustic and electric, Universal Music Canada 2xCD
- 2007 – Like A Hurricane (16-track tribute album provided with the December 2007 issue of Uncut Magazine)
- 2008 – More Barn – A Tribute to Neil Young, Slothtrop Music
- 2008 – Cinnamon Girl – Women Artists Cover Neil Young for Charity, American Laundromat Records 2xCD
- 2011 – Harvest Revisited – Neil Young's classic album featuring covers re-recorded for Mojo Magazine 1xCD
- 2012 – Music Is Love: A Singer-Songwriter Tribute to the Music of CSNY Route 66 2xCD

=== Grammy Awards ===
Year	Nominee / work	Award	Result
1990	Freedom	Best Male Rock Vocal Performance	Nominated
1991	"Rockin' in the Free World"	Best Male Rock Vocal Performance	Nominated
1994	"Harvest Moon"	Record of the Year	Nominated
1994	"Harvest Moon"	Song of the Year	Nominated
1994	"My Back Pages"	Best Rock Performance by a Duo or Group with Vocal	Nominated
1995	"Philadelphia"	Best Male Rock Vocal Performance	Nominated
1995	Sleeps with Angels	Best Rock Album	Nominated
1996	"Peace and Love"	Best Male Rock Vocal Performance	Nominated
1996	"Downtown"	Best Rock Song	Nominated
1996	Mirror Ball	Best Rock Album	Nominated
1996	Mirror Ball	Best Recording Package	Nominated
1997	Broken Arrow	Best Rock Album	Nominated
2006	"The Painter"	Best Solo Rock Vocal Performance	Nominated
2006	Prairie Wind	Best Rock Album	Nominated
2007	"Lookin' for a Leader"	Best Solo Rock Vocal Performance	Nominated
2007	"Lookin' for a Leader"	Best Rock Song	Nominated
2007	Living with War	Best Rock Album	Nominated
2009	"No Hidden Path"	Best Solo Rock Vocal Performance	Nominated
2010	"Fork in the Road"	Best Solo Rock Vocal Performance	Nominated
2010	The Archives Vol. 1 1963–1972	Best Boxed or Special Limited Edition Package	Won
2010	Neil Young	MusiCares Person of the Year	Won
2011	"Angry World"	Best Solo Rock Vocal Performance	Nominated
2011	"Angry World"	Best Rock Song	Won
2011	Le Noise	Best Rock Album	Nominated
2014	Psychedelic Pill	Best Rock Album	Nominated
2015	A Letter Home	Best Boxed or Special Limited Edition Package	Nominated
2021	A Band A Brotherhood A Barn	Best Music Film	Nominated

=== Juno Awards ===
Year	Nominee / work	Award	Result
2021	Best Rock Album	Colorado	Nominated
2011	Artist of the Year	Neil Young	Won
2011	Adult Alternative Album of the Year	Le Noise	Won
2008	Adult Alternative Album of the Year	Chrome Dreams II	Nominated
2007	Adult Alternative Album of the Year	Living With War	Won
2006	Adult Alternative Album of the Year	Prairie Wind	Nominated
2006	Jack Richardson Producer of the Year	"The Painter"	Won
2006	Songwriter of the Year	"The Painter", "When God Made Me", "Prairie Wind"	Nominated
2001	Best Male Artist	Neil Young	Won
2001	Best Roots & Traditional Album – Solo	Silver & Gold	Nominated
1997	Male Vocalist of the Year	Neil Young	Nominated
1996	Best Rock Album	Mirror Ball	Nominated
1996	Male Vocalist of the Year	Neil Young	Nominated
1995	Songwriter of the Year	Neil Young	Nominated
1995	Male Vocalist of the Year	Neil Young	Won
1995	Entertainer of the Year	Neil Young	Nominated
1994	Single of the Year	"Harvest Moon"	Nominated
1994	Album of the Year	Harvest Moon	Won
1993	Songwriter of the Year	Neil Young	Nominated
1993	Male Vocalist of the Year	Neil Young	Nominated
1991	Male Vocalist of the Year	Neil Young	Nominated
1990	Male Vocalist of the Year	Neil Young	Nominated
1989	Male Vocalist of the Year	Neil Young	Nominated
1986	Male Vocalist of the Year	Neil Young	Nominated
1982	Male Vocalist of the Year	Neil Young	Nominated
1981	Male Vocalist of the Year	Neil Young	Nominated
1980	Male Vocalist of the Year	Neil Young	Nominated
1979	Male Vocalist of the Year	Neil Young	Nominated
1975	Composer of the Year	Neil Young	Nominated

=== MTV Video Music Awards ===
Year	Nominee / work	Award	Result
1984	"Wonderin'"	Most Experimental Video	Nominated
1989	"This Note's for You"	Video of the Year	Won
1989	"This Note's for You"	Viewer's Choice Award	Nominated

== See also ==
- Canadian rock – Canadian contributions to rock music
- List of Canadian Grammy Award winners and nominees
- List of peace activists
- Music of Canada

== Sources ==
- Chong, Kevin (2005). Neil Young nation: a quest, an obsession, and a true story. Vancouver, Berkeley, California: Greystone Books. ISBN 978-1-55365-116-1. OCLC 61261394.
- Downing, David (1994). A dreamer of pictures: Neil Young – the man and his music. London: Bloomsbury Publishing. ISBN 978-0-7475-1499-2. OCLC 59833966.
- Dufrechou, Carole (1978). Neil Young. London: Quick Fox. ISBN 978-0-8256-3917-3. OCLC 4168835.
- Echard, William (2005). Neil Young and the Poetics of Energy. Bloomington: Indiana University Press. ISBN 978-0-253-21768-4.
- Einarson, John (1992). Neil Young: don't be denied: the Canadian years. Kingston, Ontario: Quarry Press. ISBN 978-1-55082-044-7. OCLC 26802024.
- George-Warren, Holly (1994). Neil Young, the Rolling stone files: the ultimate compendium of interviews, articles, facts, and opinions from the files of Rolling stone. New York: Hyperion. ISBN 978-0-7868-8043-0. OCLC 30074289.
- Hardy, Phil; Laing, Dave (1990). The Faber companion to 20th-century popular music. London, Boston: Faber and Faber. ISBN 978-0-571-13837-1. OCLC 28673718.
- Heatley, Michael (1997). Neil Young: in his own words. London, New York: Omnibus Press. ISBN 978-0-7119-6161-6. OCLC 38727767.
- McDonough, Jimmy (2002). Shakey: Neil Young's Biography. New York City, NY: Random House. ISBN 978-0-679-42772-8. OCLC 47844513.
- McKay, George (2009) "'Crippled with nerves": popular music and polio'. Archived September 16, 2018, at the Wayback Machine Popular Music 28:3, 341–365.
- McKay, George (2013) Shakin' All Over: Popular Music and Disability. Ann Arbor: University of Michigan Press.
- Rogan, Johnny (2000). Neil Young: Zero to Sixty: A Critical Biography. London: Omnibus Press. ISBN 978-0-9529540-4-0. OCLC 47997606.
- Simmons, Sylvie (2001). Neil Young: reflections in broken glass. Edinburgh: Mojo. ISBN 978-1-84195-084-6. OCLC 48844799.
- Skinker, Chris (1998). "Neil Young". In Kingsbury, Paul (ed.). The encyclopedia of country music: the ultimate guide to the music. New York: Oxford University Press. p. 607. ISBN 978-0-19-511671-7. OCLC 38106066.
- Taylor, Steve (2006). A to X of Alternative Music. Continuum. ISBN 978-0-8264-8217-4.
- Williamson, Nigel (2002). Journey Through the Past: The Stories Behind the Classic Songs of Neil Young. Hal Leonard. ISBN 978-0-87930-741-7.
- Young, Neil; Mazzeo, James (2004). Greendale. London: Sanctuary. ISBN 978-1-86074-622-2. OCLC 57247591.
- Young, Neil (2014). Special Deluxe: A Memoir of Life & Cars. Blue Rider Press. ISBN 978-0-399-17208-3.
- Young, Neil (2013). Waging Heavy Peace: A Hippie Dream. Plume. ISBN 978-0-14-218031-0.
- Young, Scott (1997). Neil and Me. Toronto: McClelland & Stewart. ISBN 978-0-7710-9099-8. OCLC 36337856.
