= Waging Heavy Peace =

Book by Neil Young

Waging Heavy Peace: A Hippie Dream
- Original hardcover
- Author: Neil Young
- Language: English
- Genre: Autobiography
- Publisher: Blue Rider Press
- Publication date: 2012
- Pages: 502 p.
- ISBN: 9780399159466
- OCLC: 798809870
- Dewey Decimal: 782.42166092
- LC Class: 2012026138

Waging Heavy Peace: A Hippie Dream is the first autobiography by the rock musician Neil Young, published in 2012. Featuring a non-linear narrative, the book covers aspects of his career, family life, hobbies, and non-musical pursuits. It was generally well-received among critics.

== Background ==
The book is Young's first autobiography and was written in 2011. According to Jimmy McDonough in the 2002 biography Shakey, Young had previously stated he would not write about himself. He explains his reasons for writing the book in a chapter called "Why This Book Exists". The 66-year-old musician states that the book is meant to make money to allow him a recuperation period away from touring and music-making. Young, who suffered a brain aneurysm in 2005, mentions the possibility of dementia in his father's health history as providing an additional impetus for writing his memoirs. The musician stopped drinking and smoking marijuana during the writing period. Young declined a ghostwriter from his publisher – writing is a family trade: father Scott Young was a sports columnist and prolific writer.

== Contents ==
One focus of the work is Young's family. He discusses his two wives, including then-current wife Pegi and first wife Susan Acevedo as well as his relationship with Carrie Snodgress. He also talks about his children, including sons Ben and Zeke, who have cerebral palsy. Young's home, the northern California ranch called Broken Arrow, features in the book.

Young's hobbies are discussed at length. He relates his love of model train building and his involvement with Lionel, LLC, a model train company, where he is a board member. He talks about his interest in carpentry, and his forays into filmmaking. Vehicles are another love, including his 1953 Buick Skylark and the electric-converted Lincoln Continental, known as LincVolt (Young is a proponent of electric vehicles and designed the LincVolt himself). Yet another obsession is his PureSound audio system (now known as Pono), which aimed to replace iPod as the dominant digital music format.

In terms of his career, the book covers his early years as a performer in Canada, including his time with the Squires in Winnipeg, Manitoba. Young's California days, his work in the 1980s with his charity the Bridge School Benefit, and the health problems of the 2000s also feature in the book.

== Reception ==
The book was generally received well, although with the caveat that it is more enjoyable for fans than for those unfamiliar with the artist. The Guardian said the style was "distinctly unplugged", and the direction "unpredictable". The New York Times made comparisons to novelist Stephen King in terms of writing style, commented that the author "seems completely free of guile", and approved of the affirmative, positive tone of Young's recollections. Several reviewers made comparisons to Bob Dylan's autobiographical Chronicles: Volume One. The New Orleans Times-Picayune called it "a satisfying read for the true fan." The Los Angeles Times described it as "sprawling, improvisational", "a stream-of-consciousness-meditation", and calls it less a memoir than a self-portrait. Canada's National Post called it a "disarming, beguiling autobiography".
