= Paradox (soundtrack) =

Soundtrack album by Neil Young and Promise of the Real
- Released: March 23, 2018
- Recorded: January 19, 2014; August 19, 2014; September – October, 2016; January 31 – February 1, 2017
- Studio: Shangri-La, Malibu; Campfire Pit, Malibu; Desert Trip Festival, Indio; Jack Singer Concert Hall, Calgary, Alberta, Canada; Capitol Studios, Los Angeles
- Genre: Experimental rock; instrumental rock
- Length: 53:00
- Label: Shakey Pictures Inc.
- Producer: Neil Young; John Hanlon; Niko Bolas

Neil Young and Promise of the Real chronology
The Visitor (2017)	Paradox (2018)	Roxy: Tonight's the Night Live (2018)

Singles from Paradox
- 1. "Peace Trail" Released: March 30, 2018

Paradox is a soundtrack album by Neil Young and Promise of the Real released on March 23, 2018, on Shakey Pictures Inc. The album serves as the soundtrack to Daryl Hannah's 2018 film, Paradox, in which Young also stars. It is the third studio album recorded by Young and Promise of the Real.

== Background and recording ==
The instrumental passages on the soundtrack, entitled the "Paradox Passages", were recorded in the studio by Young and Promise of the Real without re-watching any of the film's footage: "We'd seen it, so we just remembered it. There are similarities [with Dead Man], but I like to do that. It's an easy way for me to express a soundtrack: I have the same thing in The LinkVolt Years."

The tracks "Show Me" and "Peace Trail" were previously recorded in a different form for Young's 2016 solo album, Peace Trail. The full-band recording of "Peace Trail", included on Paradox, was the first time Young and Promise of the Real had performed the song together. The live version of "Pocahontas" is from a 2014 performance. Also, the song "Tumbleweed" is a re-recorded version from his 2014 album Storytone, and the song "Hey" contains a guitar riff from the song "Love and Only Love" from Young's album with Crazy Horse Ragged Glory.

Band member Lukas Nelson performs a cover of "Angel Flying Too Close to the Ground" by his father, Willie Nelson. Regarding capturing this performance for the film, director Daryl Hannah noted, "It's effortless magic that always happens between them. It's a real gift to witness the creative freedom they have around each other."

== Reception ==
Professional ratings
Review scores
Source	Rating
Pitchfork	6.0/10

In a mostly positive review for Pitchfork, Stephen Thomas Erlewine wrote: "Drifting between spooky guitar solos, sweet strums, and half-remembered choruses, this soundtrack occasionally stops for a full-fledged song, but these complete moments feel accidental, as if the fog lifts just long enough to reveal a full landscape." Uncut's Michael Bonner wrote: "In many respects, the ramshackle, campfire vibe of the soundtrack mirrors Hannah's film itself – but, critically, it is neither a fully immersive experience like the Dead Man soundtrack or a third album with Promise of the Real. It's perhaps best not to view Paradox (either film or soundtrack) as a major work from a significant artist, but yet another of Young's shaggy digressions."

== Track listing ==
No.	Title	Length
1.	"Many Moons Ago in the Future"	0:30
2.	"Show Me"	1:46
3.	"Paradox Passage 1"	2:16
4.	"Hey"	3:18
5.	"Paradox Passage 2"	1:23
6.	"Diggin' in the Dirt - Chorus"	1:11
7.	"Paradox Passage 3"	2:52
8.	"Peace Trail"	5:06
9.	"Pocahontas"	3:14
10.	"Cowgirl Jam"	10:36
11.	"Angel Flying Too Close to the Ground"	4:41
12.	"Paradox Passage 4"	0:13
13.	"Diggin' in the Dirt"	3:15
14.	"Paradox Passage 5"	0:24
15.	"Running to the Silver Eagle"	2:54
16.	"Baby What You Want Me to Do?"	1:23
17.	"Paradox Passage 6"	0:18
18.	"Offerings"	0:51
19.	"How Long?"	2:26
20.	"Happy Together"	0:46
21.	"Tumbleweed"	4:01

== Personnel ==
- Neil Young – guitar, ukulele, pump organ, harmonica, vocals
- Lukas Nelson – guitars, vocals
- Micah Nelson – pump organ, charango, guitar, vocals
- Corey McCormick – bass, upright bass, vocals
- Anthony LoGerfo – drums, bongos
- Tato Melgar – drums, percussion
- Jim Keltner – drums
- Paul Bushnell – bass
- Willie Nelson – spoken word
- Joe Yankee – electric harp
- "Storytone Orchestra" (on Tumbleweed) – violins, violas, cellos, basses, oboes, English horn, bassoons, French horns, harps, pianos, acoustic guitars, conducting

Additional roles

- Gary Burden, Jenice Heo – art direction
- Adam CK Vollick – art, photography, recording (19–20)
- Daryl Hannah, Dana Fineman – art & photography
- Dana Nielsen – engineering, recording, mixing (8, 10–11)
- Eric Lynn – recording (2)
- Tim Mulligan, Dave Lohr – recording, mixing (8–10)
- John Hanlon – mixing (8, 10–11, 13, 16), recording (11, 13, 16), production
- Niko Bolas – production, engineering (21)
- Al Schmitt – recording, mixing (21)
- Steve Genewick – engineering (21)
- Chris Walden – arrangements, conducting, production (21)
- L.D. Call – recording (1)
- Johnnie Burik, Rob Bisel, Tyler Beans, John Hausmann, Diego Ruelas – assistant engineers
- Chris Bellman – mastering
- Elliot Roberts – direction

== Charts ==
Chart (2018)	Peak position
Austrian Albums (Ö3 Austria)	36
Belgian Albums (Ultratop Flanders)	57
Belgian Albums (Ultratop Wallonia)	114
Dutch Albums (Album Top 100)	85
French Albums (SNEP)	171
German Albums (Offizielle Top 100)	32
Hungarian Albums (MAHASZ)	19
Spanish Albums (Promusicae)	87
Swiss Albums (Schweizer Hitparade)	65
US Soundtrack Albums (Billboard)	24
