= Earth (Neil Young and Promise of the Real album) =

Live album by Neil Young & Promise of the Real
- Released: June 17, 2016
- Recorded: July 5 – October 17, 2015
- Venue: Various
- Genre: Rock
- Length: 97:26
- Label: Reprise
- Producers: John Hanlon; Neil Young

Neil Young chronology
Bluenote Café (2015)	Earth (2016)	Peace Trail (2016)

Promise of the Real chronology
Something Real (2016)	Earth (2016)	Noise & Flowers (2022)

Earth is a live album by Neil Young and Promise of the Real, released on June 17, 2016 on Reprise Records. Recorded during the band's Rebel Content Tour in 2015, the album was produced by Young and John Hanlon and features live performances augmented by studio overdubs and additional nature and animal sounds.

== Background ==
Young described the album as "a collection of 13 songs from throughout my life, songs I have written about living here on our planet together." The album's mix also includes nature and animal sounds, including turkeys, insects, crows, and thunder. Young said that he was inspired by animals because "they don't have this uptight vibe. They don't have all the hatred and everything."

Young appeared on the podcast WTF with Marc Maron to promote the album. During the interview, he described Earth as "an ear movie" and said that he wanted to break the rules of live recordings. He discussed a scene in the 1992 film Bram Stoker's Dracula where the camera shows the perspective of a flying bat, and said this was an inspiration for the album. He revealed that the French horn part in the Earth version of "After the Gold Rush" was lifted from the master tapes of the original 1970 recording of the song, which he intended to have a disorienting effect. He also revealed that the backup singers on Earth are professional vocalists who primarily record commercial jingles, which he intended as an "edgy" choice. He directed the singers to sing optimistically about Exxon and Monsanto, and "make it sound like a beautiful day."

Prior to a scheduled phone interview with Newsweek, Young's publicist instructed writer Zach Schonfeld to listen to the album in the Pono format. Young hung up on Schonfeld three minutes into the call because he did not believe Schonfeld had listened to the entire record.

== Critical reception ==
Professional ratings
Aggregate scores
Source	Rating
Metacritic	65/100
Review scores
Source	Rating
AllMusic	3.5/5 stars
The Arts Desk	4/5 stars
Entertainment Weekly	B−
Exclaim!	6/10
Mojo	3/5 stars
Paste	8.8/10
Pitchfork	6.5/10
Q	2/5 stars
Record Collector	3/5 stars
Rolling Stone	3.5/5 stars

Earth has a score of 65 out of 100 on the review aggregator website Metacritic, based on 17 reviews, indicating "generally favorable reviews". In his positive review for AllMusic, Stephen Thomas Erlewine called Earth "one of Young's genuinely inspired nutso albums" and wrote that "animal sounds infect Earth, sometimes swallowing the guitars, sometimes chirping along in rhythm, an effect that is precisely the opposite of natural." Writing for Rolling Stone, David Fricke compared the "urgent" performances to "1991's live Weld cut at Farm Aid with the last-stand fervor of Freedom." Pitchfork Media's Sam Sodomsky wrote that "Simply put, the album would probably be better without [the animal sounds]," but stated that Earth overall "is surprisingly balanced and well-considered," thanks to "the thematic consistency of Young's songwriting" and the "loose, steady groove" of Promise of the Real. Exclaim!'s Stuart Henderson called the album "another daft musical statement", criticizing its "barn-based rock'n'roll".

== Track listing ==
All songs written and composed by Neil Young.

Disc one
No.	Title	Original release	Length
1.	"Mother Earth (Natural Anthem)"	Ragged Glory	5:40
2.	"Seed Justice"	-	3:58
3.	"Country Home"	Ragged Glory	6:02
4.	"The Monsanto Years"	The Monsanto Years	8:20
5.	"Western Hero"	Sleeps With Angels	4:03
6.	"Vampire Blues"	On the Beach	5:55
7.	"Hippie Dream"	Landing on Water	5:54
8.	"After the Gold Rush"	After the Gold Rush	4:09
9.	"Human Highway"	Comes a Time	4:11

Disc two
No.	Title	Original release	Length
1.	"Big Box"	The Monsanto Years	9:20
2.	"People Want to Hear About Love"	The Monsanto Years	5:20
3.	"Wolf Moon"	The Monsanto Years	6:30
4.	"Love and Only Love"	Ragged Glory	28:04

== Personnel ==
Neil Young + Promise of the Real

- Neil Young – lead vocals, electric guitar, acoustic guitar, harmonica, pump organ, piano
- Lukas Nelson – guitar, piano, backing vocals
- Micah Nelson – electric guitar, electric charango, backing vocals
- Corey McCormick – bass guitar, backing vocals
- Tato Melger – percussion
- Anthony Logerfo – drums

Additional musicians

- DRAM – additional vocal ("People Want to Hear About Love")
- Nico Segal – trumpet ("People Want to Hear About Love")
- Joe Yankee – bass ("Mother Earth")
- Bill Peterson – flugelhorn ("After the Gold Rush")
- Charissa Nelson, Windy Wagner, Christine Helferich Gutter, Suzanne Waters, Eric Bradley, Gerald White, Jasper Randall, Brian Chapman – studio backing vocals
- Darrell Brown – studio backing vocal arrangements

Additional roles

- Neil Young – producer, mixing, wildlife recording
- John Hanlon – producer, mixing, wildlife recording
- Eric Lynn – engineer, wildlife recording
- Johnnie Burik – assistant engineer, wildlife recording
- Tim Mulligan – live mix and recording
- Dave Lohr – live mix and recording
- Dana Nielsen – studio backing vocal recording
- Jake Valentine – studio backing vocal recording assistant
- Joey Vitas – studio backing vocal recording assistant
- Billy Centenaro – studio backing vocal recording assistant
- Kevin Smith – wildlife recording
- Will Mitchell – wildlife recording
- Chris Bellman – mastering
- Gary Burden, Jenice Heo – art direction and design
- DH Lovelife – Earth cover logo design and painting, back and inside cover photography
- Richard Hammar – CD label photography

== Charts ==
Chart (2016)	Peak position
Australian Albums (ARIA)	37
Austrian Albums (Ö3 Austria)	9
Belgian Albums (Ultratop Flanders)	18
Belgian Albums (Ultratop Wallonia)	38
Dutch Albums (Album Top 100)	30
Finnish Albums (Suomen virallinen lista)	32
French Albums (SNEP)	29
German Albums (Offizielle Top 100)	10
Greek Albums (IFPI)	54
Irish Albums (IRMA)	27
Italian Albums (FIMI)	33
New Zealand Heatseekers Albums (RMNZ)	2
Norwegian Albums (VG-lista)	30
Spanish Albums (Promusicae)	49
Swedish Albums (Sverigetopplistan)	40
Swiss Albums (Schweizer Hitparade)	14
UK Albums (Official Charts)	14
US Billboard 200	138
US Top Rock Albums (Billboard)	12
US Americana/Folk Albums (Billboard)	6
US Vinyl Albums (Billboard)	22
US Indie Store Album Sales (Billboard)	6
