= The Visitor (Neil Young and Promise of the Real album) =

Studio album by Neil Young and Promise of the Real
- Released: December 1, 2017
- Recorded: November 4 – 7, 2016; June 9, 2017; August 5 – 7, 2017
- Studio: Shangri-La (Malibu, California); Capitol (Hollywood)
- Genre: Rock
- Length: 51:11
- Label: Reprise
- Producer: John Hanlon; Neil Young

Neil Young chronology
Hitchhiker (2017)	The Visitor (2017)	Paradox (2018)

Promise of the Real chronology
Something Real (2016)	The Visitor (2017)	Paradox (2018)

Singles from The Visitor
- 1. "Children of Destiny" Released: July 4, 2017; 2. "Already Great" Released: November 3, 2017; 3. "Almost Always" Released: February 1, 2018

Professional ratings
Aggregate scores
Source	Rating
Metacritic	68/100
Review scores
Source	Rating
AllMusic	2.5/5 stars
The A.V. Club	C−
Classic Rock	4/5 stars
The Guardian	3/5 stars
The Independent	2/5 stars
Mojo	4/5 stars
The Observer	3/5 stars
Pitchfork	6.7/10
Q	4/5 stars
Rolling Stone	3.5/5 stars

The Visitor is the fortieth studio album by Canadian / American singer-songwriter Neil Young and his second studio album with American rock group Promise of the Real. The album was released on December 1, 2017, on Reprise Records. The album was preceded by the singles "Children of Destiny", which was released on July 4, 2017, and "Already Great", which was released on November 3, 2017, and is in response to President Donald Trump's campaign slogan of Make America Great Again.

== Critical reception ==
The Visitor has a score of 68/100 on Metacritic.

== Track listing ==
All tracks composed by Neil Young.

No.	Title	Length
1.	"Already Great"	5:47
2.	"Fly by Night Deal"	2:37
3.	"Almost Always"	4:50
4.	"Stand Tall"	5:13
5.	"Change of Heart"	5:54
6.	"Carnival"	8:21
7.	"Diggin' a Hole"	2:33
8.	"Children of Destiny"	3:24
9.	"When Bad Got Good"	2:00
10.	"Forever"	10:32

== Personnel ==
- Neil Young – guitar, piano, harmonica, pump organ, whistle, water bottle, bathroom whistle, vocals
- Micah Nelson – piano, guitar, pump organ, mandolin, glockenspiel, whistle, toy piano, accordion, vocals
- Lukas Nelson – guitar, whistle, water bottle, vocals
- Corey McCormick – bass, whistle, water bottle, vocals
- Anthony LoGerfo – drums, whistle, vocals
- Tato Melgar – percussion, whistle, water bottle, vocals
- Additional orchestration – vocals, violas, cellos, basses, flutes, oboe, clarinets, bassoons, French horns, trumpets, trombones, cimbassos, harp

Additional roles

- Gary Burden, Jenice Heo – art direction & design
- Daryl Hannah – photography
- Dana Fineman – photography
- John Hanlon – production, mixing
- Niko Bolas – production
- Al Schmitt – mixing, recording
- Dana Nielsen – recording, engineering
- Steve Genewick, Changler Harrod – engineering
- Johnnie Burik, Rob Bisel – assistant engineering
- Chris Bellman – mastering
- Elliot Roberts – direction

== Charts ==
Chart (2017–18)	Peak position
Australian Albums (ARIA)	85
Austrian Albums (Ö3 Austria)	32
Belgian Albums (Ultratop Flanders)	29
Belgian Albums (Ultratop Wallonia)	87
Canadian Albums (Billboard)	43
Dutch Albums (Album Top 100)	39
Finnish Albums (Suomen virallinen lista)	47
French Albums (SNEP)	113
German Albums (Offizielle Top 100)	25
Irish Albums (IRMA)	45
New Zealand Heatseeker Albums (RMNZ)	5
Norwegian Albums (VG-lista)	36
Scottish Albums (OCC)	36
Spanish Albums (Promusicae)	52
Swedish Albums (Sverigetopplistan)	32
Swiss Albums (Schweizer Hitparade)	40
UK Albums (OCC)	65
US Billboard 200	167
US Americana/Folk Albums (Billboard)	5
US Top Rock Albums (Billboard)	24
US Indie Store Album Sales (Billboard)	4
