= A Rock Star Bucks a Coffee Shop =

Single by Neil Young & Promise of the Real

from the album The Monsanto Years
- Released: June 29, 2015
- Recorded: February 11, 2015
- Studio: Teatro, Oxnard
- Genre: Rock
- Length: 5:00
- Label: Reprise Records
- Songwriter: Neil Young
- Producers: Neil Young; John Hanlon

Neil Young & Promise of the Real singles chronology
"Who's Gonna Stand Up?" (2014)	"A Rock Star Bucks a Coffee Shop" (2015)	"Wolf Moon" (2015)

"A Rock Star Bucks a Coffee Shop" is a song recorded by Neil Young and Promise of the Real. It is a protest song aimed at the companies Starbucks and Monsanto. The piece comes from the concept album The Monsanto Years, which primarily criticizes Monsanto.

== Background and lyrics ==
The song was released as a single in May 2015 and is the first song on the album The Monsanto Years.

It refers to the lawsuit by Monsanto against Vermont due to the state's attempt at passing a GMO labeling law. The song also references "the poison tide of Monsanto" and a farmer who signs a GMO deal when Young sings, "I want a cup of coffee but I don't want a GMO. I'd like to start my day off without helping Monsanto."

In a brief review of the song, Stefan Schmidt in The National Singles Round-Up also remarked that song did not hold back against critiquing Starbucks and Monsanto and suggested that Young had not lost his appetite for tackling political issues.

=== Venue ===
Young also introduced an acoustic version of the song in Maui while performing at "OUTGROW Monsanto", a festival held to protest Monsanto's business practices in Hawaii.

Moreover, the song was also featured in Young's July and October 2015 tours, for which Promise of the Real served as his backing band.

== Personnel ==
- Neil Young – guitar, whistling, vocals
- Lukas Nelson – guitar, whistling, vocals
- Micah Nelson – guitar, whistling, vocals
- Anthony LoGerfo – drums
- Corey McCormick – bass, whistling, vocals
- Tato Melgar – percussion
