= Paradox (2018 film) =

- Poster
- Directed by: Daryl Hannah
- Written by: Daryl Hannah
- Produced by: Bernard Shakey; Elliot Rabinowitz
- Starring: Neil Young; Lukas Nelson; Micah Nelson
- Cinematography: Adam Vollick
- Edited by: Paul Snyder
- Music by: Neil Young; Promise of the Real
- Distributed by: Netflix
- Release dates: March 15, 2018 (SXSW); March 23, 2018
- Running time: 73 minutes
- Country: United States
- Language: English

Paradox is a 2018 American musical film written and directed by Daryl Hannah, and starring Neil Young and his current backing band Promise of the Real. A soundtrack album, Paradox, by Young and the band was released to coincide with the film.

== Plot ==
A band of outlaws hide high up in the Mountains. The group pass the hours searching for treasure while they wait for the full moon to lend its magic, bring the music and make the spirits fly.

== Cast ==
- Neil Young as "The Man In The Black Hat"
- Lukas Nelson as "Jail Time"
- Micah Nelson as "Particle Kid"
- Corey McCormick as "Cookie" McCormick
- Anthony LoGerfo as "Happy"
- Tato Melgar as Tato
- Willie Nelson as "Red"
- Elliot Roberts as "Cowboy" Elliot
- Hilary Shepard as Lady
- Dave Snowbear Toms as "Snowbear"
- Charris Ford as "Weed"

== Release ==
The film premiered at the 2018 South by Southwest festival on March 15, 2018. It then debuted on Netflix worldwide on March 23, 2018.

== Reception ==
On review aggregator website Rotten Tomatoes, the film holds an approval rating of 29%, based on seven reviews, and an average rating of 3.9/10. On Metacritic, the film has a weighted average score of 31 out of 100, based on 4 critics, indicating "generally unfavorable" reviews.
