= Storytone =

Studio album by Neil Young
- Released: November 4, 2014
- Recorded: June 2014 (solo versions); August 2014 (orchestral/big band versions)
- Studios: Capitol (Hollywood) (big band versions); Sony (orchestral versions)
- Genres: Folk rock; symphonic rock; big band; swing
- Length: 41:32; 37:05 (solo); 43:05 (mixed pages)
- Label: Reprise
- Producers: Neil Young; Niko Bolas

Neil Young chronology
| A Letter Home (2014) | Storytone (2014) | The Monsanto Years (2015) |

Storytone is the thirty-sixth studio album by Canadian-American musician Neil Young, released on November 4, 2014, on Reprise Records. The album was released in two formats: a single disc, which features orchestral and big band arrangements of the songs, and a deluxe edition which includes stripped-back recordings of the songs. Young subsequently released a third version of the album, Mixed Pages of Storytone, merging elements of both, later in the year.

Storytone is the second studio album Neil Young released in 2014, following the predominantly lo-fi release A Letter Home.

== Background ==
In March 2014, Neil Young expressed interest in recording an album alongside an orchestra, stating: "I'd like to make a record with a full-blown orchestra, live – a mono recording with one mic. I want to do something like that where we really record what happened, with one point of view and the musicians moved closer and farther away, the way it was done in the past. To me that's a challenge and it's a sound that's unbelievable, and you can't get it any other way."

During Neil Young and Crazy Horse's summer tour, the band performed a new track, entitled "Who's Gonna Stand Up?", which subsequently appeared on the album, without Crazy Horse.

== Writing and composition ==
Many of the album's tracks were inspired by Young's burgeoning romance with actress Daryl Hannah, and his divorce from his wife of thirty-six years, Pegi Young. Regarding the tracks, Young stated: "These songs were written during a period of profound change in my life. Everything I want to share is there." The songs "Glimmer" and "I'm Glad I Found You" fit this theme. In a 2021 post to his website, Young describes "Glimmer", a song about missing old love, and finding new love, as the "essence of Storytone, telling the tale. In another post from 2020, referring to "I'm Glad I Found You", he states "In life, you can't have too many love songs. "I'm Glad I Found You" is just that, a true love song."

Young's collaborators for the album, conductors Michael Bearden and Chris Walden noted the impact of Young's life changes on the music and his desire to try a new approach to recording. Says Bearden, "He took himself out of his comfort zone. He basically told us to do what we felt." Walden continues, "He went through some changes in his private life, which is always a fruitful time for new songs. So apparently a lot of these recent personal experiences went into these songs." Bearden adds, "It's a big ball of vulnerability, and that's what I love about it."

The lyrics to "Plastic Flowers" imagine an encounter with Mother Nature's daughter. Young revisits the imagery in a 2021 post on his website: "I remember the look she gave me when I showed her some plastic flowers in my rolling log cabin. Shortly after that when I first recognized her and saw who she was, my life was changed forever. Mother Nature's daughter."

"Who's Gonna Stand Up?" is a call to action to protect and preserve the earth. In a 2019 post on the Neil Young Archives website, he states "We have to help Earth, so she can help us. Where Science and truth take on the Devil and money, the song is about us." The song was released as a single.

At a 2014 concert, Young discusses the theme of "When I Watch You Sleeping" and his current state of mind, tying the bliss of his new relationship with his environmental concerns:

"So I don't wanna go crazy here. Love is beautiful. Life is great. This is a great place. I am not totally blown away by these bad things that are happening to the point that that I can't live right now. I am just like any other animal; I really love to play around. Have a good time. I love to love. I love to fly. I like to prance around, frolic with my little friends, like the horses in the field, like dogs playing. I think that's what this is all about. I think that's why we're here. So, I have a lot of love. And just think that I want to make it better and that's why these songs keep coming. That's why there are so many more people now thinking this then there were before. It's way too much for us to do and paying $28 billion per year of our taxpayer money to support the oil companies just doesn't seem right and then they use that money to advertise how cool they are. Human energy. Those families - nice looking lady with her kid, the sun's beautiful shining - it's great. I love it to be like that, I really would. I would like it to be like that forever. I don't see it happening with the oil companies. Here is a song for love."

== Recording ==
Writing on his official website, Young detailed the recording of the two versions of Storytone:

"First, I recorded the songs at Capitol Records with my old friends Niko Bolas and Al Schmitt. I sang them alone with only the instruments I desired to use. There was no over dubbing or enhancing. The resulting music is from my heart, directly to you. Then, I entered the hallowed MGM sound stage where The Wizard of Oz soundtrack was recorded. Surrounded by the finest musicians in Hollywood, with arrangements and orchestrations by Christ Walden and Michael Bearden, I sang seven of the Storytone songs live for the second time. I sang into Barbra Streisand's microphone, a perfectly cared-for antique with a wonderful tone that I loved. I also went to Sunset Boulevard to record the remaining three songs with a big band in an old Hollywood studio rebuilt and now known as East West. All the performances are live with no added effects or recording. I just stood singing into the microphone with occasional harmonica notes blown in between verses, while the musicians played."

For the first time, Young performed the songs on the orchestral album without playing guitar or piano, allowing him to focus on his vocals. He recorded his vocals holding a microphone standing in front of the ensemble, Frank Sinatra style. Young explains to Charlie Rose:

"Well it's an orchestral record of sorts and also a big band record. There are some big band things on it and that's pretty exciting for me because you know, I've never done anything like that before. And plus on this record, I only played Harmonica I didn't play a guitar or a piano when I played with the orchestra or the big band I just stood there like Frank Sinatra or somebody with a big microphone and sang like that video showed. And I found that singing that way was very freeing experience without having to think about anything else, you know. I'm not thinking about my chord changes or the rhythm or how I was singing against the guitar or the piano. I'm kind of a mediocre piano player so I really have to think about some of my chords and I'm going to hit the right ones are always on my mind. So if I don't have any of that to think about, then I'm thinking wow hey. I got an orchestra. 60 instruments and 32 voices for a couple songs for like three or four of the songs are that big and then the other ones, there's a 50 piece brass band for one of the songs."

== Commercial and critical performance ==
Professional ratings
Aggregate scores
| Source | Rating |
|---|---|
| Metacritic | 60/100 |
Review scores
| Source | Rating |
| AllMusic | 3/5 stars |
| American Songwriter | 3.5/5 stars |
| The A.V. Club | D |
| Exclaim! | 7/10 |
| The Guardian | 4/5 stars |
| Mojo | 3/5 stars |
| Paste | 7/10 |
| Pitchfork | 4.8/10 |
| PopMatters | 6/10 |
| Rolling Stone | 2.5/5 stars |
| Slant Magazine | 2.5/5 stars |

The album debuted at No. 33 on Billboard 200, No. 2 on Folk Albums, and No. 4 on Top Rock Albums, selling 10,768 copies in its first week. It has sold 40,000 copies in the US as of June 2015.

The album has a 60 out of 100 Metascore from Metacritic, indicating "Mixed or average reviews". Robert Christgau suggested in 2018 that he appreciated the album and may have underrated it at the time of its release, writing it "showed up in my Neither file, which these days is kind of an honor, because I seldom add to it now that I don't feel obliged to nail down every possible Honorable Mention."

== Track listing ==
All songs written and composed by Neil Young.

| No. | Title | Length |
|---|---|---|
| 1. | "Plastic Flowers" (orchestral) | 4:06 |
| 2. | "Who's Gonna Stand Up?" (orchestral) | 4:23 |
| 3. | "I Want to Drive My Car" (big band) | 3:08 |
| 4. | "Glimmer" (orchestral) | 4:59 |
| 5. | "Say Hello to Chicago" (big band) | 4:57 |
| 6. | "Tumbleweed" (orchestral) | 3:37 |
| 7. | "Like You Used to Do" (big band) | 2:39 |
| 8. | "I'm Glad I Found You" (orchestral) | 3:39 |
| 9. | "When I Watch You Sleeping" (orchestral) | 5:30 |
| 10. | "All Those Dreams" (orchestral) | 4:25 |

Deluxe edition Disc 1: Solo Storytone
| No. | Title | Length |
|---|---|---|
| 1. | "Plastic Flowers" | 4:02 |
| 2. | "Who's Gonna Stand Up?" | 3:49 |
| 3. | "I Want to Drive My Car" | 2:22 |
| 4. | "Glimmer" | 3:10 |
| 5. | "Say Hello to Chicago" | 4:54 |
| 6. | "Tumbleweed" | 3:22 |
| 7. | "Like You Used to Do" | 2:38 |
| 8. | "I'm Glad I Found You" | 3:22 |
| 9. | "When I Watch You Sleeping" | 5:34 |
| 10. | "All Those Dreams" | 3:52 |

Mixed Pages of Storytone
| No. | Title | Length |
|---|---|---|
| 1. | "Like You Used to Do" | 2:41 |
| 2. | "When I Watch You Sleeping" | 5:33 |
| 3. | "I Want to Drive My Car" | 3:12 |
| 4. | "Plastic Flowers" | 4:05 |
| 5. | "Glimmer" | 5:12 |
| 6. | "All Those Dreams" | 4:14 |
| 7. | "Say Hello to Chicago" | 4:53 |
| 8. | "Tumbleweed" | 3:24 |
| 9. | "Who's Gonna Stand Up?" | 6:16 |
| 10. | "I'm Glad I Found You" | 3:35 |

== Personnel ==
- Neil Young – vocals, harmonica, ukulele (on "Tumbleweed"), painting on cover art, production
- Storytone Orchestra – vocals, violins, violas, cellos, basses, oboe, trombones, French horns, trumpets, saxophones, bassoons, flutes, English horn, clarinet, percussion, organs, harp, pianos, banjo, guitars, drums, keyboards, Wurlitzer

Additional roles

- Niko Bolas – production, engineering
- Gary Burden, Jenice Heo – art direction & design
- Al Schmitt – recording, mixing
- Steve Genewick – engineering
- John Hausmann, Diego Ruelas – assistant engineering
- Chris Walden – orchestration (conducting, arrangements, production)
- Michael Bearden – conducting, arrangements, production
- Patrick Russ – orchestration
- Doug Sax, Eric Boulangerie – mastering
- Elliot Roberts – direction

== Charts ==
| Chart (2014) | Peak position |
|---|---|
| Austrian Albums (Ö3 Austria) | 15 |
| Belgian Albums (Ultratop Flanders) | 20 |
| Belgian Albums (Ultratop Wallonia) | 47 |
| Danish Albums (Hitlisten) | 17 |
| Dutch Albums (Album Top 100) | 28 |
| Finnish Albums (Suomen virallinen lista) | 28 |
| French Albums (SNEP) | 54 |
| German Albums (Offizielle Top 100) | 11 |
| Italian Albums (FIMI) | 35 |
| Norwegian Albums (VG-lista) | 7 |
| Spanish Albums (Promusicae) | 42 |
| Swedish Albums (Sverigetopplistan) | 21 |
| Swiss Albums (Schweizer Hitparade) | 18 |
| UK Albums (Official Charts) | 20 |
| US Billboard 200 | 33 |
| US Americana/Folk Albums (Billboard) | 2 |
| US Top Rock Albums (Billboard) | 4 |
| US Indie Store Album Sales (Billboard) | 2 |
