= A Letter Home =

Studio album by Neil Young
- Released: April 19, 2014
- Recorded: September 16, 2013
- Studios: Third Man Recording, Nashville, Tennessee
- Genres: Folk rock; lo-fi
- Length: 39:25
- Label: Third Man
- Producers: Jack White III; Neil Young

Neil Young chronology
Live at the Cellar Door (2013)	A Letter Home (2014)	Storytone (2014)

A Letter Home is the thirty-fifth studio album by Canadian / American musician Neil Young. Released on April 19, 2014, on Record Store Day by Third Man Records, it was produced by Young in collaboration with Jack White of The White Stripes.

== Background ==
The album was recorded in a refurbished 1947 Voice-o-Graph vinyl recording booth at Jack White's Third Man Records recording studio in Nashville, Tennessee. Young said in March 2014 that the album would "be very confusing to people because it is retro-tech... It's all acoustic with a harmonica inside a closed space, with one mic to vinyl." White said, "we were obfuscating beauty on purpose to get to a different place, a different mood." In a May 2014 interview with David Fricke for Rolling Stone, Young described White as "an original. I've watched originals my whole life. I've absorbed from originals, taken that and turned it into me. That's the folk process." A message on Young's website described the album as "an unheard collection of rediscovered songs from the past recorded on ancient electro-mechanical technology."

== Songs ==
The album consists of covers of classic tracks by artists including Bruce Springsteen, Bob Dylan, Willie Nelson, Gordon Lightfoot, which Young described as "songs I listened to as I formulated what to do with my life." He said it was a "roots project" which explored his origins and the music that has affected him, adding that he chose tracks that "resonate with me personally". He described "On the Road Again" as "kind of a world-level song for me. It's like, 'Yes, I love this, this is how I feel, I'm that kind of guy, I AM that guy.'"

The opening spoken-word track, and other spoken lines throughout the album, are addressed to his mother, Edna 'Rassy' Young, who died in 1990. "She would've loved it," Young said. "Jack told me, 'You know, they used to send messages on these records. It wasn't always just music'". The first song on the album is Phil Ochs' "Changes". In a 2020 post to his website, Young hailed Ochs as "one of the very greatest writers of the folk era...The folk duo Jim and Jean introduced me to Phil Ochs back in the sixties and "Changes" is my favorite song of Phil's. Great lyrics." In a 2023 post he said that the track was "one of the first songs that showed me what a song could be."

Young said that he "just had to do" Bob Dylan's "Girl from the North Country". "With Bob's masterful songwriting, the chords are all sideways," he said, adding, "I love my version." Young recorded Bert Jansch's "Needle of Death" having unintentionally used the song as the basis of his own "Ambulance Blues" years earlier. Young acknowledged that his track has "almost the same chords, you can see how I copped all the changes, I was so influenced by him I basically rewrote his song with a different theme." The album features two selections by fellow Canadian Gordon Lightfoot, who Young called "a master. I love Gordy's songs. Both of the songs of his I did on the record are very touching and very emotional to me."

== Recording ==
Young was inspired to record the album after seeing the Voice-o-Graph machine that Jack White had painstakingly restored over eighteen months, and which he allows visitors to his Third Man Records shop to record on. White said that, "It sounds really incredible now. People used it to send audio letters to each other. People in the army, in wars, sending messages home." Young was using White's studio "for a Willie Nelson tribute that we did for Willie's birthday... People were coming and recording on the booth... It was kind of like the email and voice mail of the day. So he was showing me this and people were coming in and making records." "There's no production, it's just a performance. It's about the essence of the songs," Young added, revealing that they recorded the songs in three days.

Each track was recorded in sections, as the booth is capable of only a short recording duration, then transferred to tape and spliced together. Young told a concert audience, "I played for 1:40 then I played past that and I'd stop. We put in another disk and I played the rest. Kept going and we cut it all together with the magic of digital magic." White said, "After the discs were cut, we transferred them to one–inch two–track with a 1953 Scully lathe at Third Man that was previously used by Cincinnati’s legendary King Records." Recording was captured using two different techniques simultaneously. Young later made a 'clean tape feed' of the album available for streaming on his website with improved sound quality over the official release.

== Reception ==
Professional ratings
Aggregate scores
Source	Rating
Metacritic	70/100
Review scores
Source	Rating
AllMusic	3.5/5 stars
The A.V. Club	B
The Guardian	4/5 stars
MusicOMH	3.5/5 stars
The Observer	4/5 stars
Pitchfork	6.3/10
Q	4/5 stars
Rolling Stone	3.5/5 stars
Spin	7/10
Uncut	7/10

Alex Petridis said that the "deliberately crackly, muffled covers album turns out to be a very powerful thing". Finding that "a certain eeriness is very much in evidence throughout", he said that "the Voice-O-Graph seems to give [Neil Young's] singing its strangeness back". The A.V. Club considered A Letter Home to be one of the best albums of the first half of 2014, calling it the "most surprising record by a guy who's built his career on surprising you". In a positive review, Rolling Stone found that, "in its perverse way, A Letter Home is one of the most enjoyable records Young has made this century" and that it "plays like a crackly field recording from a lost world." "You can hear the continuous scrape of the grooves, pops, and momentary warps," a review in Pitchfork notes, adding that the album contains "some stunning performances" and one which is "heart-wrenching".

== Awards ==
Album cover artist Gary Burden was nominated for a Grammy Award for Best Boxed Or Special Limited Edition Package.

== Track listing ==
No.	Title	Writer(s)	Length
1.	"A Letter Home Intro"		2:16
2.	"Changes"	Phil Ochs	3:56
3.	"Girl from the North Country"	Bob Dylan	3:32
4.	"Needle of Death"	Bert Jansch	4:57
5.	"Early Morning Rain"	Gordon Lightfoot	4:24
6.	"Crazy"	Willie Nelson	2:16
7.	"Reason to Believe"	Tim Hardin	2:47
8.	"On the Road Again"	Willie Nelson	2:23
9.	"If You Could Read My Mind"	Gordon Lightfoot	4:04
10.	"Since I Met You Baby"	Ivory Joe Hunter	2:13
11.	"My Hometown"	Bruce Springsteen	4:08
12.	"I Wonder If I Care as Much"	The Everly Brothers	2:29

Bonus tracks from box set singles
No.	Title	Writer(s)	Length
13.	"Blowin' in the Wind"	Bob Dylan	3:39
14.	"Crazy" (alternate take)	Willie Nelson	2:25

== Personnel ==
- Neil Young – vocals, guitar, harmonica, piano, production
- Jack White – vocals, piano on "On the Road Again"; vocals, guitar on "I Wonder If I Care as Much", production

Additional roles

- Gary Burden, Jenice Heo – art direction & design
- Jo McCaughey, Will Mitchell – photography
- Kevin Carrico, Joshua V. Smith – engineering
- Mindy Watts – assistant engineering
- George Ingram – recording
- Bob Ludwig – mastering
- Elliot Roberts – direction

DVD production

- Bernard Shakey (Neil Young) – direction
- Will Mitchell – production, menu sound design, sound (documentary)
- Elliot Rabinowitz – executive production
- Benjamin Johnson – editing, photography direction (documentary)
- Hannah Choe – editing
- Kris Kunz, Atticus Culver-Rease – graphics
- Toshi Onuki – menu art direction
- Julian Baker – hand lettering
- Marcy Gensic – clearances

== Box set ==
The box set includes:

- 1 standard 12" LP pressed on 180-gram black vinyl
- 1 "direct feed from the booth" audiophile 12" LP pressed on 180-gram black vinyl
- Seven 6" vinyl 33 RPM discs pressed on clear vinyl
- 1 standard CD
- 1 standard DVD with footage from the recording
- 1 32-page, 12" x 12" book
- Download card to redeem the digital album of the "direct feed from the booth" audiophile version

The 7th 6" disc of this set features a version of Dylan's "Blowin' in the Wind" backed with an alternate take/arrangement of "Crazy"

== Charts ==
=== Weekly charts ===
Chart (2014)	Peak position
Australian Albums (ARIA)	46
Austrian Albums (Ö3 Austria)	20
Belgian Albums (Ultratop Flanders)	13
Belgian Albums (Ultratop Wallonia)	53
Canadian Albums (Billboard)	17
Danish Albums (Hitlisten)	11
Dutch Albums (Album Top 100)	18
Finnish Albums (Suomen virallinen lista)	26
French Albums (SNEP)	42
German Albums (Offizielle Top 100)	19
Hungarian Albums (MAHASZ)	6
Irish Albums (IRMA)	8
Italian Albums (FIMI)	41
New Zealand Albums (RMNZ)	37
Norwegian Albums (VG-lista)	37
Scottish Albums (Official Charts)	11
Spanish Albums (Promusicae)	46
Swedish Albums (Sverigetopplistan)	52
Swiss Albums (Schweizer Hitparade)	29
UK Albums (Official Charts)	17
US Billboard 200	13
US Americana/Folk Albums (Billboard)	1
US Top Rock Albums (Billboard)	3
US Indie Store Album Sales (Billboard)	2

=== Year-end charts ===
Chart (2014)	Position
Belgian Albums (Ultratop Flanders)	186
