= Peace Trail (album) =

Studio album by Neil Young
- Released: December 9, 2016
- Recorded: September 9 – 12, 2016
- Studio: Shangri-La Studios
- Genre: Rock
- Length: 38:20
- Label: Reprise
- Producer: Neil Young; John Hanlon

Neil Young chronology
Earth (2016)	Peace Trail (2016)	Hitchhiker (2017)

Singles from Peace Trail
- 1. "Indian Givers" Released: September 18, 2016; 2. "Peace Trail" Released: October 28, 2016; 3. "Show Me" Released: November 11, 2016; 4. "My Pledge" Released: November 18, 2016

Peace Trail is the thirty-eighth studio album by Canadian / American singer-songwriter Neil Young, released on December 9, 2016, on Reprise Records. Co-produced by Young and John Hanlon, the album was recorded at record producer Rick Rubin's Shangri-La Studios.

Described as a "primarily acoustic" album, Young recorded Peace Trail with drummer Jim Keltner and bass guitarist Paul Bushnell.

== Background ==
Peace Trail was written and recorded following the release of Young's live album, Earth, in 2016. Despite working extensively with Promise of the Real throughout 2015 and 2016, Young opted to record a solo album with session musicians Jim Keltner (drums) and Paul Bushnell (bass). Young explains the decision to Mother Jones:

"I started writing Peace Trail here in Colorado, then I went back to California. I had a few other tunes going around in my head, so I had a couple of them finished after a few days and then I wanted to go into the studio. I like to go in right away as soon as I have things. I called the guys from Promise of the Real, whom I've been playing with, and they were all on the road. Right after I hung up the phone, I wrote another song and started writing another, and I'm going, 'Hey, I can't wait. I should be doing this now!' My experience tells me that when it's there, it's there, and you can't make it wait. So I got Jimmy Keltner and Paul Bushnell, two good guys, and went in and did this record."

== Writing ==
The album's songs find Young commenting on technology and social change, and the need for people to drive that change for the positive. He explains, "This record has a good feeling. When something may be worn out, thank God or the Great Spirit or whoever for something new that is coming. That's the greatest news you could ever have. Maybe it's a baby, maybe it's a movement, maybe it's a way of thinking, maybe it's evolution. Who knows? But it's a big deal, and it's not a bad feeling."

In the song "Indian Givers", Young expresses support for local activists at the Standing Rock Sioux Reservation amid the then ongoing Dakota Access Pipeline protests. Young spent his 71st birthday joining the protesters and performing at the site.

The lyrics to "Show Me" express support for women's rights. Young remembers the reaction from the audience when he first played the song: "When I first sang that, I think it was in Telluride, Colorado, and I heard that sound. I've never heard that before: all the women in the audience spontaneously erupting into applause, or encouragement, or whatever it was — recognition?"

== Recording ==
The album was recorded in four days at Shangri-La Studio in Malibu in mid-September 2016. The album features only Young, Keltner and Bushnell, with additional overdubs by Young, credited to Joe Yankee. The album is Young's first to employ Auto-Tune, on the song "My Pledge".

== Critical reception ==
Professional ratings
Aggregate scores
Source	Rating
Metacritic	57/100
Review scores
Source	Rating
AllMusic	2/5 stars
Classic Rock	4/5 stars
Exclaim!	3/10
The Guardian	2/5 stars
Now	1/5 stars
Paste	8.5/10
Pitchfork	6.7/10
Q	3/5 stars
Rolling Stone	3/5 stars
Uncut	4/5 stars

Peace Trail received mixed reviews upon its release. At Metacritic, which assigns a normalized rating out of 100 to reviews from mainstream critics, the album has received an average score of 57, based on 18 reviews, indicating "mixed or average reviews".

In a positive review for Uncut, Damien Love expressed surprise that Young opted not to record with his current backing band Promise of the Real, but praised the album's collaborators, Paul Bushnell and Jim Keltner: "Bushnell provides that perfect kind of bass you barely notice. Keltner’s percussion is a different story. Captured mostly in first or second takes, he doesn’t so much keep the beat as respond to what Young is doing, an improvised interplay of odd, shaggy patterns. The record often becomes a duet between Young and Keltner." In another positive review for Classic Rock Magazine, Rob Hughes wrote: "While it may not be the most musically involved album of his 50-year career, it’s persuasive evidence that Young still has a lot to offer."

In a mostly positive review for Pitchfork, Sam Sodomsky praised Young's dedication to releasing politically charged albums and his prolific output: "While Young's voice has certainly never sounded older than it does here, there’s something youthful about his energy. Besides the fact that his two-album-a-year-clip keeps him in pace with your Ty Segalls or John Dwyers, his music is guided by a restless determination to cover new ground and speak his mind."

In a negative review for AllMusic, Stephen Thomas Erlewine suggests that the album's recording process was rushed: "It's interesting aesthetically, but the problem with Peace Trail isn't the concept, it's the execution. Intended as a musical bulletin à la "Ohio" or Living with War, Peace Trail is filled with songs about its precise moment in time, but the execution is so artless it veers toward indifference."

== Track listing ==
No.	Title	Length
1.	"Peace Trail"	5:32
2.	"Can't Stop Workin'"	2:45
3.	"Indian Givers"	5:41
4.	"Show Me"	4:02
5.	"Texas Rangers"	2:29
6.	"Terrorist Suicide Hang Gliders"	3:17
7.	"John Oaks"	5:12
8.	"My Pledge"	3:54
9.	"Glass Accident"	2:53
10.	"My New Robot"	2:35

== Personnel ==
- Neil Young – guitar, vocals, production
- Jim Keltner – drums
- Paul Bushnell – bass
- Micah Nelson – vocals
- Joe Yankee – electric harp, pump organ

Additional roles

- Eric Lynn – engineering
- Elliot Roberts – direction
- John Hanlon – production, mixing
- Johnny Burik, Kevin Smith – assistant engineering
- Tim Mulligan – postproduction assistance

== Charts ==
Chart (2016)	Peak position
Australian Albums (ARIA)	52
Austrian Albums (Ö3 Austria)	27
Belgian Albums (Ultratop Flanders)	30
Belgian Albums (Ultratop Wallonia)	61
Canadian Albums (Billboard)	72
Dutch Albums (Album Top 100)	23
German Albums (Offizielle Top 100)	23
Irish Albums (IRMA)	58
Italian Albums (FIMI)	75
New Zealand Heatseekers Albums (RMNZ)	1
Norwegian Albums (VG-lista)	36
Scottish Albums (OCC)	41
Spanish Albums (Promusicae)	82
Swedish Albums (Sverigetopplistan)	14
Swiss Albums (Schweizer Hitparade)	24
UK Albums (OCC)	57
US Billboard 200	76
US Americana/Folk Albums (Billboard)	3
US Top Rock Albums (Billboard)	8
US Indie Store Album Sales (Billboard)	5
