= The Monsanto Years =

Studio album by Neil Young and Promise of the Real
- Released: June 29, 2015
- Recorded: January 27 – February 11, 2015
- Studio: Teatro Theater, Oxnard, California, United States
- Genre: Rock
- Length: 50:54
- Label: Reprise
- Producer: Neil Young; John Hanlon

Neil Young chronology
Storytone (2014)	The Monsanto Years (2015)	Bluenote Café (2015)

Promise of the Real chronology
Wasted (2012)	The Monsanto Years (2015)	Something Real (2016)

Singles from The Monsanto Years
- 1. "A Rock Star Bucks a Coffee Shop" Released: May 26, 2015; 2. "Wolf Moon" Released: June 10, 2015

The Monsanto Years is the thirty-seventh studio album by Canadian-American singer-songwriter Neil Young and the American rock group Promise of the Real, released on June 29, 2015, on Reprise Records. A concept album which criticizes the agribusiness company Monsanto, it is Young's thirty-fifth studio album and the third by Promise of the Real. The album is the first collaboration between Young and Promise of the Real. The group is fronted by Lukas Nelson and features his brother Micah, both sons of Willie Nelson.

The album was produced by both Young and John Hanlon, and is accompanied by a film documenting the recording process.

== Background ==
Young had a long-time friendship with Willie Nelson and his sons, Lukas and Micah, and jammed with Lukas' bandmates in Lukas Nelson & Promise of the Real after 2014's Farm Aid. Micah reflects on their relationship with Young: "Neil doesn't want us to hold back musically, and we all were quickly absorbed into the fold with him. We look up to him with respect, but he never treated us like we were younger, he treats us as equals. He's now our homie and he doesn’t act like he's 71."

== Writing ==
Songs on the album reflect Young's dissatisfaction with genetically modified organisms, or GMOs, and the lack of requirements that GMO-sourced foods be labelled as such. The song "A Rock Star Bucks a Coffee Shop" reflects Young's unhappiness at Starbucks' efforts to prevent a Vermont referendum from taking effect that would have required the labeling of GMO-sourced food products.

The song "People Want to Hear About Love" reflect Young's challenges in balancing his competing desires to sing about social issues but also express more personal, emotional topics in his songs. He explained to Marc Maron:

"The song started from... I was playing a lot of songs about anti-corporate songs and all these things, and somebody just, I got the message, people want to hear about love, that's what they want to hear. I'm going, 'Well, I don't give a, I don't care. I've sang about love already. "Only Love Can Break Your Heart". I sang about many aspects of love.' Just quite recently I did an album called Storytone that's all about love. That was only a couple albums ago. I'm going, 'Does this mean that I can only do 'that'? And I can't talk about things like the dangers of different things and incongruous things that are happening. Pollution, corruption, corporate government.' Those things, I think they're interesting."

== Recording ==
Recording for the album began January 2015. Young announced that he was recording an album with the band—including non-member Micah—at a converted movie theater Teatro in Oxnard, California, the site where Willie Nelson's Teatro album was recorded. Young sent a CD to his collaborators with demos to allow them to learn some of the new songs before arriving to perform together on the new compositions.

The recording was filmed by Don Hannah alongside live rehearsals in April 2015 for a film also entitled The Monsanto Years.

Young debuted a music video for "Wolf Moon" on June 10, 2015.

== Reception ==
Professional ratings
Aggregate scores
Source	Rating
Metacritic	61/100
Review scores
Source	Rating
AllMusic	3.5/5 stars
The A.V. Club	C
The Guardian	5/5 stars
NME	8/10
Paste	9.2/10
Pitchfork	5.2/10
Q	2/5 stars
Rolling Stone	3/5 stars
Slant Magazine	2/5 stars
Uncut	8/10

=== Critical ===
In a highly positive review, The Guardian's Jon Dennis gave the album five stars out of five. Praising the contributions of Promise of the Real, Dennis wrote: [The band] sound not unlike Crazy Horse, and supply all the big riffs, crashing major chords and harmonies that have characterised Young's best records for five decades." Zach Schonfeld of The A.V. Club gave the album a "C" rating, opining that the concept of the album and its execution were "underproduced, underwritten, and not likely to take up more than a few months (if not weeks or days) of Young's promotional energies before he moves to the next thing" but with some highlights among the harder rock songs. Stephen Thomas Erlewine of AllMusic gave the album 3.5 stars out of 5, claiming that: "Young uses his sturdy footing to lash out at what he perceives as destructive forces – to our dinner tables and social fabric – and if the individual message may wind up fading like yesterday's newspapers, the music will keep The Monsanto Years burning bright". An Associated Press review of the album argued that Young's criticisms of corporate greed descend into preachiness, saying Young's anger is "so real that it could be tasted, but there is something discomfiting about Young positioning himself as an all-knowing seer, putting people down for wanting simpler, cheerier songs."

Billboard solicited the opinions of corporations criticized on the album, including Monsanto, whose representative said: "Many of us at Monsanto have been and are fans of Neil Young. Unfortunately, for some of us, his current album may fail to reflect our strong beliefs in what we do every day to help make agriculture more sustainable. We recognize there is a lot of misinformation about who we are and what we do—and unfortunately several of those myths seem to be captured in these lyrics." Notably all the corporations mentioned in album lyrics except for Chevron provided their responses for the request to comment on the album songs. Reacting to the "Big Box" track Walmart said: "As you might have seen recently, Walmart raised its lowest starting wage to $9 an hour. We're proud of the opportunity we provide people to build a career and have a chance at a better life." Starbucks commented on "A Rock Star Bucks a Coffee Shop": "Starbucks has not taken a position on the issue of GMO [genetically modified organism] labeling. As a company with stores and a product presence in every state, we prefer a national solution."

=== Commercial ===
The album debuted at No. 21 on the Billboard 200 albums chart on its first week of release, selling around 18,000 copies in the United States in its first week. It also debuted at No. 4 on Billboard's Rock Albums chart. and No. 2 on the Folk Albums chart. As of June 2016, the album has sold 41,000 copies in the US.

=== Monsanto ===
Criticism of the company led Monsanto to investigate Young and write an internal memo on his social media activity and music.

== Track listing ==
No.	Title	Length
1.	"A New Day for Love"	5:52
2.	"Wolf Moon"	3:52
3.	"People Want to Hear About Love"	6:19
4.	"Big Box"	8:17
5.	"A Rock Star Bucks a Coffee Shop"	5:00
6.	"Workin' Man"	4:43
7.	"Rules of Change"	4:39
8.	"Monsanto Years"	7:46
9.	"If I Don't Know"	4:26

== Personnel ==
- Neil Young – vocals, guitar, production
- Lukas Nelson – guitar, backing vocals
- Micah Nelson – electric guitar, electric charango, backing vocals
- Corey McCormick – bass guitar, backing vocals
- Tato Melgar – percussion
- Anthony Logerfo – drums

Technical personnel

- Johnnie Burik – assistant engineering
- Alberto Hernandez – assistant engineering
- John Hanlon – production, engineering
- John Hausmann – stage and monitor engineering
- Chris Kasych – stage and monitor engineering
- Keith "Moby" Lanoux – guitar tech
- Bob Ludwig – mastering
- Jeff Pinn – engineering
- Jimmy Sloan – assistant engineering, production coordination

Artwork

- Neil Young, Lukas Nelson, Corey McCormick, Tato Melgar, Anthony Logerfo – cover design
- Micah Nelson – cover painting, DVD label art, cover design
- Gary Burden – art direction
- Howard Chandler Christy – booklet painting
- Jenice Heo – art direction
- Eric Johnson – cover art, lettering
- Other Shoe Photography – booklet cover photography

== Charts ==
Chart (2015)	Peak position
Australian Albums (ARIA)	23
Belgian Albums (Ultratop Flanders)	24
Belgian Albums (Ultratop Wallonia)	32
Dutch Albums (Album Top 100)	14
Finnish Albums (Suomen virallinen lista)	23
French Albums (SNEP)	24
German Albums (Offizielle Top 100)	13
Hungarian Albums (MAHASZ)	15
Italian Albums (FIMI)	27
Irish Albums (IRMA)	17
Norwegian Albums (VG-lista)	38
Scottish Albums (OCC)	14
Spanish Albums (Promusicae)	40
Swedish Albums (Sverigetopplistan)	47
UK Albums (OCC)	24
UK Americana Albums (OCC)	16
US Billboard 200	21
US Americana/Folk Albums (Billboard)	2
US Top Rock Albums (Billboard)	4
US Indie Store Album Sales (Billboard)	2
