= American Romance (album) =

2025 album by Lukas Nelson

Studio album by Lukas Nelson
- Released: June 20, 2025
- Producer: Shooter Jennings

American Romance is an album by Lukas Nelson.

On March 21, 2025, Nelson announced his debut solo album American Romance along with the single "Ain't Done". The album was issued on June 20, 2025, and was produced by Shooter Jennings.
