= Turn Off the News (Build a Garden) =

Studio album by Lukas Nelson & Promise of the Real
- Released: June 14, 2019
- Recorded: 2018–2019
- Genre: Country rock
- Length: 51:13
- Label: Fantasy Records

Lukas Nelson & Promise of the Real chronology
Lukas Nelson & Promise of the Real (2017)	Turn Off the News (Build a Garden) (2019)

Turn Off the News (Build a Garden) is the fifth studio album by American country rock band Lukas Nelson & Promise of the Real. The album was released on June 14, 2019, by Fantasy Records.

== Critical reception ==
Professional ratings
Aggregate scores
Source	Rating
Metacritic	76/100
Review scores
Source	Rating
AllMusic	4/5 stars
American Songwriter	3.5/5 stars
Pitchfork	6.0/10

Turn Off the News (Build a Garden) received generally positive reviews from critics. At Metacritic, which assigns a normalized rating out of 100 to reviews from critics, the album received an average score of 76, which indicates "generally favorable reviews", based on 10 reviews.

== Commercial performance ==
The album has sold 16,100 copies in the United States as of October 2019.

== Track listing ==
No.	Title	Length
1.	"Bad Case"	4:39
2.	"Turn Off the News (Build a Garden)" (featuring Sheryl Crow)	3:43
3.	"Where Does Love Go"	3:43
4.	"Save a Little Heartache"	3:09
5.	"Lotta Fun"	2:57
6.	"Civilized Hell"	4:50
7.	"Mystery"	3:33
8.	"Simple Life"	4:43
9.	"Out in LA"	4:20
10.	"Something Real"	3:42
11.	"Stars Made of You"	4:33
12.	"Turn Off the News (Build a Garden)" (acoustic)	3:01
13.	"Consider It Heaven"	4:19
Total length:		51:13

== Charts ==
Chart (2019)	Peak position
US Billboard 200	151
US Top Country Albums (Billboard)	19
US Top Rock Albums (Billboard)	31
US Americana/Folk Albums (Billboard)	4
