= Lukas Nelson & Promise of the Real =

American rock band

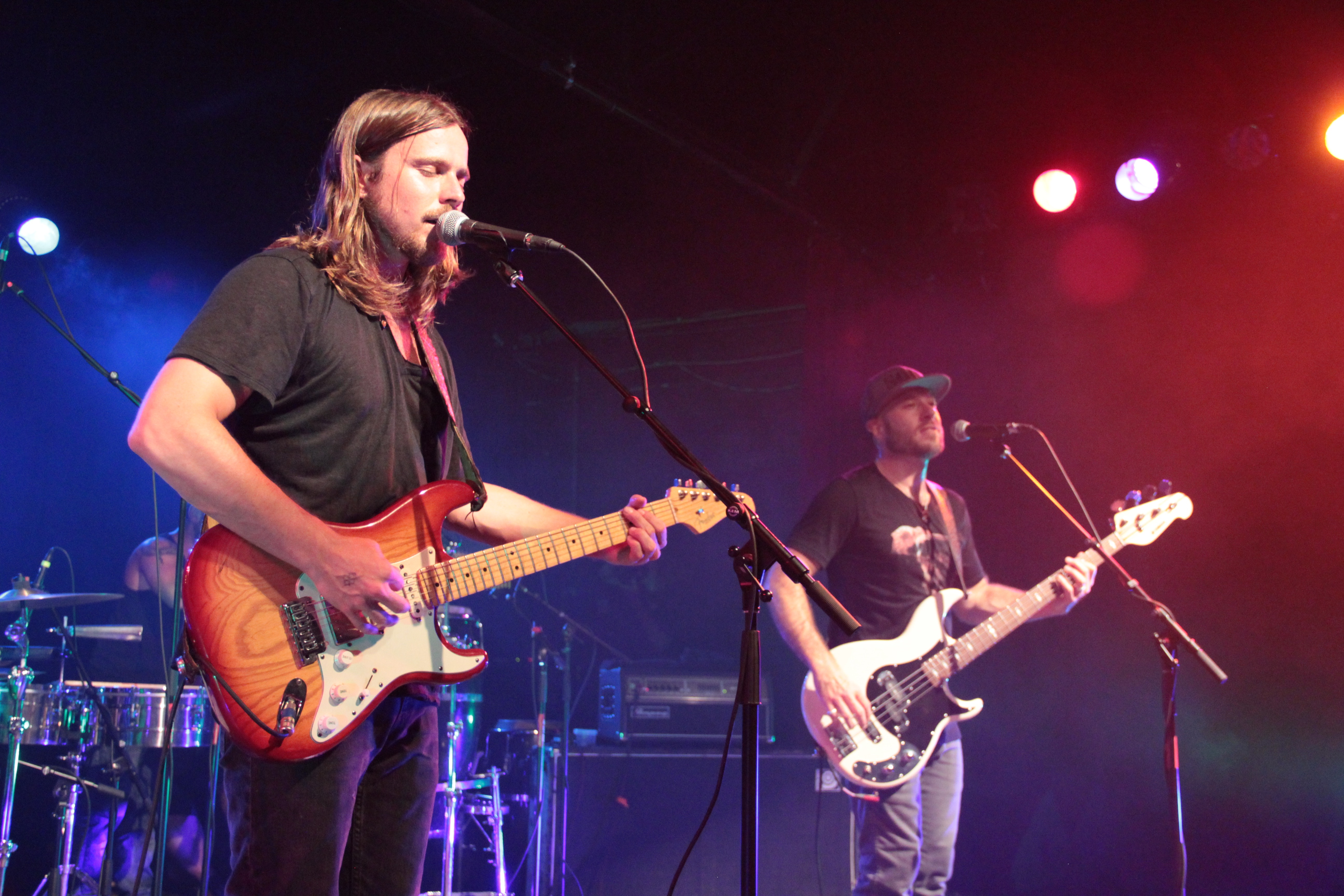
- Lukas Nelson & Promise of the Real performing in 2016

Background information
- Also known as: POTR
- Origin: Venice, Los Angeles, California, U.S.
- Genres: Rock, country rock, roots rock
- Years active: 2008–2024
- Label: Fantasy
- Spinoffs: Neil Young and the Chrome Hearts
- Members: Lukas Nelson; Anthony LoGerfo; Tato Melgar; Corey McCormick; Logan Metz
- Past members: Micah Nelson; Merlyn Kelly
- Website: lukasnelson.com

Lukas Nelson and Promise of the Real, sometimes referred to as POTR, is an American country rock band formed in Los Angeles in 2008 by Lukas Nelson. The band consists of Lukas Nelson (lead vocals, songwriter, acoustic and electric guitars, piano), Anthony LoGerfo (drums, percussion), Corey McCormick (bass guitar, upright bass, vocals), Logan Metz (keyboards, lap steel, banjo, harmonica, vocals), and Tato Melgar (percussion). They have released eight studio albums, two live albums, numerous singles and extended plays (EP).

Outside of the US, Promise of the Real came into view as the backing band for Canadian musician Neil Young, with whom they recorded three studio albums (including a film soundtrack) and two live albums. When performing and recording with Young, Lukas's brother, Micah Nelson, was a member of Promise of the Real.

On June 3, 2024, POTR announced an indefinite hiatus, with plans to continue to collaborate in the future. Following the band's hiatus, Corey McCormick and Anthony Logerfo became members of Young's latest backing band, the Chrome Hearts, alongside regular collaborator Micah Nelson and organist Spooner Oldham.

== History ==
=== Formation and early releases (2008–2016) ===
In 2008, not long after moving from Maui to Los Angeles, Lukas Nelson (Willie Nelson's son) met fellow musician Anthony LoGerfo at a Neil Young concert. LoGerfo and Nelson discovered their shared love of rock music, particularly that of Young. Nelson soon quit school, and with LoGerfo, launched Promise of the Real, picking up Tato Melgar (percussionist), and Merlyn Kelly (bassist). According to Nelson, the band name was inspired by the lyric "Some get stoned, some get strange, but sooner or later it all gets real", from Young's song "Walk On". Nelson explained in the 2019 interview, "That concept of realness is sort of a Taoist statement: It's not bad, it's not good. It's real."

Their initial touring was supported by sales of their EP, Live Beginnings, recorded in 2008 at the Belly Up Tavern in Solana Beach, California. By January 2009, they were on the road with Willie Nelson, a trip that included five nights of shows at The Fillmore in San Francisco, California. Later that year, they shared the stage with B. B. King and appeared at festivals including the Waterfront Blues Festival and the Telluride Brews and Blues Festival. Over the next two years, they toured relentlessly, performing over 200 shows a year.

In 2009, they released the studio EP Brando's Paradise Sessions. The five track release featured bassist John Avila in place of their original bassist, Merlyn Kelly, who left the band that year. The cover art for the album was a painting by Nelson's younger brother, Micah Nelson, an artist, composer and musician whose artwork appears on several of the band's other albums as well.

In March 2010, they released their first studio album, Promise of the Real, recorded at the Pedernales Recording Studio in Austin, Texas. Bassist Corey McCormick, Kelly's replacement, appears on the album having joined the band in 2009. The album consists of twelve tracks, three of which are covers: "Peaceful Solution" (Willie Nelson), "Pali Gap/Hey Baby" (Jimi Hendrix) and "L.A." (Neil Young). An interview with LoGerfo revealed that the art for the album was created by the six-year old daughter of album engineer Steve Chadie. The release includes a booklet of Micah Nelson's paintings created on stage during their concerts.

Two more albums, Wasted and Live Endings, were released in 2012 under the Tidal Tone label. Neil Young has greatly influenced them, in both their music style and production values and at his urging, sessions being recorded in analog. Nelson believes doing so "added a lot of magnetism and energy [and] sounds more like what you get when you see us perform." Wasted co-producer, Jim "Moose" Brown (musician/songwriter/producer), arranged addition of steel guitar, harmonica, Dobro guitar, Wurtlitzer piano, and Hammond B3 organ bringing a wider range of instrumentation than their previous studio recordings.

In April 2012, they appeared on Bob Weir's TRI Studios broadcast on Yahoo Music. Later that year, they backed John Fogerty on his coast-to-coast tour of Canada The band continued to open shows for Willie Nelson, and performed a cover of Pearl Jam's "Just Breathe" live on Willie's Roadhouse channel on SiriusXM on May 15, 2012. They consistently performed each year at the televised Farm Aid fundraising concerts, and by 2013, the band had appeared on a number of major late night talk shows including The Tonight Show with Jay Leno, Late Night with Conan O'Brien, and The Late Show with David Letterman.

The band completed their 2014 tour and moved into an old Victorian mansion, the William Westerfeld House, a historic landmark in San Francisco, California. After they completed the sessions at the mansion they delayed releasing a new album until 2016 in order to pursue a venture with their rocker idol, Neil Young. The band released their album Something Real, in March 2016, on the Royal Potato Family label. The album was co-produced by the band and Steve Chadie. With the exception of two tracks, Nelson wrote all the music, and Neil Young appears as a guest vocalist.

=== With Neil Young (2014–2019) ===
Nelson's connection with Neil Young is deeply rooted in the Farm Aid festival. His father, Young and John Mellencamp launched the Farm Aid music festival in 1985. Lukas and Promise of the Real were regularly appearing at the event by 2009, the year Young remarked to them "I heard you guys earlier, I liked it. You sound pretty cool." At the 2014 Farm Aid event, Young spontaneously called the band up to play along with him on a jam of "Rockin' in the Free World" and he recruited them to be his recording and touring band. In 2015, Young brought them into his studio to record his next album, The Monsanto Years, released in 2016. The album production was filmed by Don Hannah for a documentary also entitled The Monsanto Years.

After an April 2015 concert with Young in San Luis Obispo, they accompanied him on his Rebel Content Tour to promote the new album. Following the tour, they appeared with Young at Farm Aid, and the annual Bridge School Benefit. The following year was a whirlwind with Young, featuring appearances at the Beale Street Music Festival and the New Orleans Jazz and Heritage Festival soon followed by his expansive European tour. Upon their return, they appeared with him at the Desert Trip show in Indio, California. On June 17, 2016, the live album Earth was released. It was recorded during the Rebel Content Tour in 2015 and featured live performances augmented by studio overdubs and nature and animal sounds.

They continued working with Neil Young, recording another album, titled The Visitor, released December 1, 2017. Young and the band starred in the musical film Paradox, directed by Daryl Hannah, and recorded the film's soundtrack, both released in 2018. In 2019, they embarked on their second European tour with Young and backed him as he co-headlined with Bob Dylan at an historic event at London’s Hyde Park performing before an audience of over 65,000. The live album, Noise & Flowers, selected songs from Young's tour of Europe in 2019, was released on August 5, 2022.

Since that 2008 meeting of Nelson and LoGerfo at Young's concert, Nelson says "We've come full circle, because [now] years later we’re playing with Neil. It's kind of a dream come true." Young was a mentor for the band, sharing wisdom and influencing everything from their production techniques to their distinctive stage presence. Nelson described playing with Neil as

"like being in a masterclass, seeing how he works. I mean, it has really been an incredible experience for me that I have taken in and put towards our own projects, our own music in terms of what we have learned from him. Dynamics, and when not to play, and the idea of how to create more emotion with your dynamics onstage and your performance."

Young praised the band, saying, "Playing with these guys was a gift. Such positivity, pure energy and no fear." and later said, "This band (and the multi-generational thing) is epic!"

=== Mainstream success and A Star Is Born film (2017–2019) ===
The band kicked off another year of coast-to-coast touring in March 2017, after wrapping up recording sessions for their next album. Over the following months, they were seen at Hardly Strictly Bluegrass, the Americana Festival, Farm Aid, touring with Outlaw Music Festival, and headlining over 100 of their own shows. In late October that year, the band embarked on their first solo European Tour. In November, they played the Stagecoach Spotlight Tour with Nikki Lane.

In August 2017, the self-titled album Lukas Nelson & Promise of the Real was released as their debut under Fantasy Records. Produced by John Alagía, the album featured two additional musicians Jesse Siebenberg (steel guitars, Farfisa organ, vocals), and Alberto Bof (piano, Wurlitzer, and Hammond organ). Lady Gaga appeared on two tracks ("Find Yourself" and "Carolina"), and the indie-pop group Lucius provided backing vocals. The album hit No. 1 on the Americana Radio Chart the week of November 10, 2017. Compared to their previous albums, Nelson described this one as having "a little more emotional weight to the songs and even to the quality of the recording. It’s more cinematic." They released three singles from the album, "Find Yourself", "Carolina", and "Forget About Georgia". Austin City Limits wrote that the album was "a mesmerizing, emotionally genuine, endlessly rewarding slice of cosmic country soul". The album earned the band its first Americana Music Awards nomination for Duo/Group of the Year.

Their 2016 performance with Neil Young at the Desert Trip turned out to be a significant appearance for the band. Actor Bradley Cooper, who was working on development of the major film A Star Is Born, happened to be in the audience and Nelson's stage presence impressed Cooper as an ideal model for the leading role of the film. He soon contacted Nelson to explore the possibility. The concept appealed to Nelson and initially, he was hired to be a consultant. He coached Cooper in 'how to keep things looking right and authentic — how to hold (the guitar), how to stand, all of that.' Nelson's role in the project grew to include writing and producing the music. Nelson co-wrote, with Cooper and Lady Gaga, the following seven tracks on the soundtrack: "Black Eyes", "Too Far Gone", "Alibi", "Look What I Found", "Is That Alright?", "Music to My Eyes", and "I Don't Know What Love Is". Ultimately, the band was brought into the project and Nelson and Promise of the Real appeared in the film as the band backing the lead character, Jackson Maine. Nelson won a BAFTA Award for Best Original Music and Grammy Award for Best Compilation Soundtrack for Visual Media for his contributions to the film. The film was released in October 2018. Release of the movie and soundtrack marked a turning point in their career. The exposure sparked an immediate increase in attendance at their performances, and a wider variety of concertgoers in the audience. Nelson also co-wrote Gaga's standalone release, "The Cure".

Turn Off the News (Build a Garden) marked the band's fifth studio album release and second studio album release for Fantasy Records. The album was released on June 14, 2019, peaking at No. 19 on Billboard's US Top Country Albums chart and 31 on Billboard's Top Rock Albums chart.

On March 27, 2020, the band released Naked Garden, a 15-track collection that is a companion piece to 2019's Turn Off the News (Build a Garden). Naked Garden includes previously unreleased versions and alternate takes of songs that were recorded during the Turn Off the News (Build a Garden) sessions at Shangri-La and Village Studios.

On April 28, 2021, the band announced their next studio album release on Fantasy Records, A Few Stars Apart, accompanied by the first single released from the album, "Perennial Bloom (Back to You)". Available June 11, 2021, the album was recorded at RCA Studio A in Nashville and Produced by Dave Cobb.

On July 14, 2023, their eighth studio album, Sticks and Stones, was released comprising 12 tracks of original music written by Nelson and recorded at Pedernales Studios.

=== Collaborations ===
On October 20, 2017, Legacy Recordings released Willie Nelson and the Boys (Willie's Stash, Vol. 2), a family collaboration showcasing Willie, Lukas, and Micah performing a selection of American country music classics, including seven penned by Hank Williams, Sr.

== Members ==
- Lukas Nelson – lead vocals, songwriter, acoustic and electric guitars, piano
- Anthony LoGerfo – drums, percussion
- Corey McCormick – bass guitar, upright bass, vocals
- Logan Metz – keyboards, lap steel, piano, banjo, harmonica, vocals
- Tato Melgar – percussion

== Discography ==
=== Studio albums ===
Title	Album details	Peak chart positions					Sales
Title	Album details	US	US Country	US Heat.	US Taste	US Folk	Sales
Promise of the Real	Release date: December 21, 2010; Label: POTR Music; Formats: Digital download	—	—	—	—	—	
Wasted	Release date: April 3, 2012; Label: Tone Tide Records; Formats: CD, digital download	—	—	—	—	—	
Something Real	Release date: March 11, 2016; Label: Royal Potato Family; Formats: CD, digital download	—	—	19	—	16	
Lukas Nelson & Promise of the Real	Release date: August 25, 2017; Label: Fantasy; Formats: CD, digital download	—	2	35	19	10	US: 31,000
Turn Off the News (Build a Garden)	Release date: June 14, 2019; Label: Fantasy; Formats: CD, digital download	151	19	—	9	4	US: 19,900
Naked Garden	Release date: March 27, 2020; Label: Fantasy; Formats: CD, digital download	—	—	—	—	—	
A Few Stars Apart	Release date: June 11, 2021; Label: Fantasy; Formats: CD, LP, digital download	—	—	—	—	—	
Sticks and Stones	Release date: July 14, 2023; Label: 6ACE / Thirty Tigers; Formats: CD, LP, digital download	—	—	—	—	—	
"—" denotes releases that did not chart

=== Collaborations ===
Title	Album details	Peak chart positions							
Title	Album details	US	AUS	GER	ITA	NED	NOR	SWE	UK
The Monsanto Years (with Neil Young)	Released: June 29, 2015; Label: Reprise	21	23	13	27	14	38	47	24
The Visitor (with Neil Young)	Released: December 1, 2017; Label: Reprise	167	85	25	—	39	36	32	65
Paradox soundtrack (with Neil Young)	Released: March 23, 2018; Label: Reprise	—	—	—	—	—	—	—	—

=== EPs ===
Title	Release date
Brando's Paradise Sessions	September 30, 2010

=== Live recordings ===
Title	Release date
Live Beginnings	October 2008
Live Endings	December 2012
Earth (with Neil Young)	June 2016
Noise & Flowers (with Neil Young)	August 2022

=== Other appearances ===
Album	Release date
Dumb and Dumber To	November 7, 2014
The Ranch	April 1, 2016
My Little Pony: The Movie	September 22, 2017
