= Jenice Heo =

American artist

Jenice J Heo
- Born: South Korea
- Education: University of Texas at Austin
- Notable work: Neil Young Archives Volume 1 design; A Letter Home vinyl box set
- Awards: 52nd Grammy Awards: Best Package
- Website: www.jeniceheo.com

Jenice Heo is an American artist and art director. In 2010, she won the 52nd Grammy Award for Best Boxed or Special Limited Edition Package for the Neil Young Archives Volume 1. She was nominated in the same category in 2015 for the vinyl box set of Neil Young's A Letter Home.

== Life and career ==
Heo was born in South Korea, but she was raised in Texas where she studied at the University of Texas at Austin. She started her career in Los Angeles as an Art Director in music packaging at Warner Bros. Records. With Jan Sheets, she created the artwork for Monster in My Pocket. Then she held jobs at A&M Records and Maverick Records, and worked with recording artists including Conor Oberst, Bright Eyes, Jim James, My Morning Jacket, Devendra Banhart, Jack White, Kurt Vile and Matt Corby. Heo and her husband Gary Burden have collaborated on the art direction and design of album covers.

When Heo worked with Young on the design of his Neil Young Archives Vol. I Box Set in 2010, Young introduced her to the work of assemblage artist Wallace Berman, influencing her "NEIL" painting on the Vol. I box. The art team that worked on the Archives – Young, Heo and Gary Burden – won the 52nd Grammy Award for Best Boxed or Special Limited Edition Package in 2010. Heo worked with Young on several more albums.

After winning the Grammy, Heo began working on what would eventually become known as the Neil Young Series—thirteen oil paintings on found objects and mixed media assemblages. The series, containing personal photographs of Young's life and found objects pointing to the themes of his music, was praised as "an intimate look into the mind of the famed musician". Young himself described the paintings as "a series of painted assemblages reflecting the spirit of different times and stages of my musical journey".

== Awards ==
Award	Category	Work	Result
52nd Annual Grammy Awards	Best Boxed or Special Limited Edition Package	The Archives Vol. 1 1963–1972	Won
57th Annual Grammy Awards	Best Boxed or Special Limited Edition Package	A Letter Home	Nominated
