= Lukas Nelson =

American singer-songwriter (born 1988)

- Nelson in 2016

Background information
- Born: December 25, 1988 (age 37); Austin, Texas, US
- Genres: Country, Americana
- Occupation: Singer-songwriter
- Instruments: Vocals, Guitar, Electric Guitar, Whistling
- Years active: 2007–present
- Label: Sony Music Nashville

Lukas Nelson (born December 25, 1988) is an American singer-songwriter known for his band Lukas Nelson & Promise of the Real and as a solo artist. Nelson has won a Grammy Award for his work with Lady Gaga for producing the soundtrack A Star Is Born. He is the son of country musician Willie Nelson.

== Early life and education ==
Nelson was born on Christmas Day 1988 in Texas, the son of country singer Willie Nelson and Annie D'Angelo (they married in 1991). One of Willie's eight children, Nelson spent his childhood surfing, and skateboarding before following in his father's footsteps. Nelson grew up between Texas and Hawaii and attended the Austin-area Montessori school his mother ran. He then went to junior high and high school in Maui. Nelson took to music at an early age, even writing a song at 11 years old that was featured on Willie Nelson's album It Allways Will Be. In 2007, Nelson moved to Los Angeles to attend Loyola Marymount University for a brief period.

== Music career ==
In 2008, Nelson formed the band Lukas Nelson & Promise of the Real after he met drummer Anthony LoGerfo at a Neil Young concert. The name for the band comes from the Neil Young song "Walk On" which features the lyric “Some get stoned, some get strange, sooner or later, it all gets real.”

In 2016 Nelson was approached by actor Bradley Cooper to work on 2018 remake of A Star Is Born, after seeing Nelson's band at the Desert Trip Festival in California. Nelson ended up writing eight songs for the film with Cooper and Lady Gaga. His work on the movie earned Nelson a BAFTA Award for Best Original Music and Grammy Award for Best Compilation Soundtrack for Visual Media. Nelson has since written more music with Lady Gaga.

On June 3, 2024, Nelson's band Promise of the Real announced an indefinite hiatus.

On March 21, 2025, Nelson announced his debut solo album American Romance along with the single "Ain't Done". The album was issued on June 20, 2025, and was produced by Shooter Jennings.

== Discography ==
=== Singles ===
- "Ain't Done" (Sony Music Nashville, March 24, 2025)

=== Albums ===
- American Romance (album) (June 20, 2025)

== Awards and nominations ==
Year	Award	Category	Work	Result	Ref.
2018	British Academy Film Awards	Best Original Music	A Star Is Born	Won	
2018	Latino Entertainment Journalists Association Film Awards	Best Music	A Star Is Born	Nominated	
2019	Grammy Awards	Best Compilation Soundtrack for Visual Media	A Star Is Born	Won	
2025	Grammy Awards	Best Traditional Country Album	American Romance	Nominated	
