= Gary Burden =

American artist (1933–2018)

Gary Lowell Francis Burden
- Born: May 23, 1933; Cleveland, Ohio, US
- Died: March 7, 2018 (aged 84); Los Angeles, California, US
- Education: UC Berkeley
- Occupation: Artist
- Known for: Pop music album covers
- Spouses: Virginia Burden: Annie Burden; Katharine Burden; Jenice Heo

Gary Burden (May 23, 1933 – March 7, 2018) was an American artist specializing in the field of album covers. He is considered one of the pioneers of the concept of album cover art.

== Early life ==
Gary Burden was born on May 23, 1933, in Cleveland, Ohio, the son of Lowell and Agatha Burden, and grew up mainly in south Florida. At the age of 16, he joined the Marine Corps. He studied architectural design at UC Berkeley.

== Career ==
In the 1960s and 1970s, he designed covers for many rock stars, such as Mama Cass, Crosby, Stills, Nash, and Young, Joni Mitchell, The Doors, The Eagles and Jackson Browne. He created album covers for Neil Young for 35 years.

His works were nominated for four Grammy Awards, and, at the 52nd Annual Grammy Awards in 2010, he won the award for Best Boxed or Special Limited Edition Packaging for the Neil Young The Archives Vol. 1 1963–1972.

Burden collaborated with photographer Henry Diltz. In 2000 they made a documentary California Rock: Under the Covers, depicting their album cover works and participation in the Los Angeles rock scene.

== Awards ==
=== Grammy Awards ===
- Nomination, Best Boxed Or Special Limited Edition Package for Neil Young, A Letter Home (2014)
- Win, Best Boxed Or Special Limited Edition Package for Neil Young, The Archives Vol. 1 1963–1972 (2009)
- Nomination, Best Recording Package for Neil Young, Mirror Ball (1995)
- Nomination, Best Album Package for The Eagles, One Of These Nights (1975)
- Nomination, Best Album Cover for Richard Pryor, Richard Pryor (1968)

== Personal life ==
He was married to Annie Burden, who is one of the "Ladies of the Canyon" in the Joni Mitchell song.

He was married to Jenice Heo.
